= Kőbánya Synagogue, Budapest =

Former synagogue, now neoprotestant church, in Kőbánya, Hungary

Kőbánya Synagogue (Temple of Everybody)
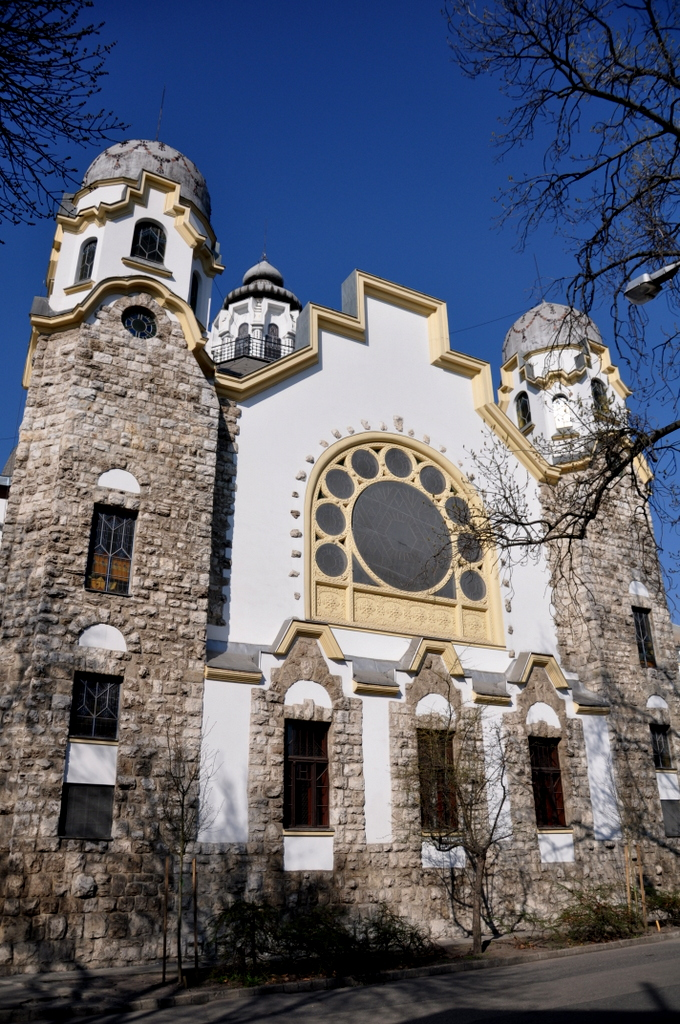
- The former synagogue, now church, in 2012

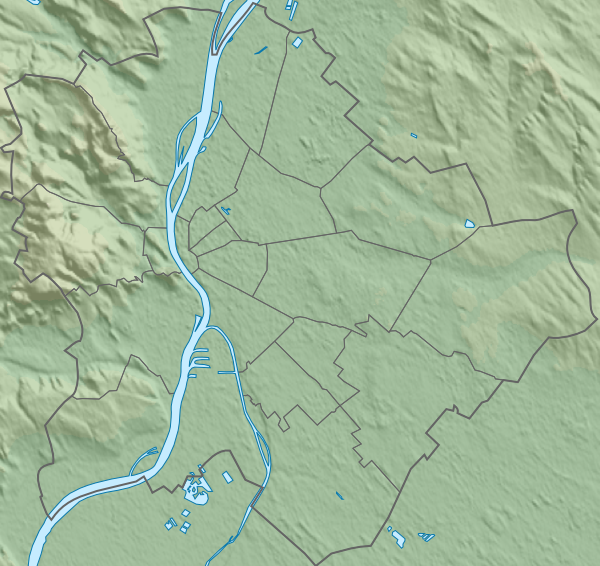
- Location of the former synagogue in Budapest

Religion
- Affiliation: Neolog Judaism (former); Pentecostalism (current)
- Rite: Nusach Ashkenaz (former)
- Ecclesiastical or organizational status: Synagogue (1912–1964); Church (since 1991)
- Status: Inactive (as a synagogue); Repurposed (as a church)

Location
- Location: Cserkesz Street 7-9, Kőbánya, Xth District, Budapest
- Country: Hungary
- Interactive map of Kőbánya Synagogue (Temple of Everybody)
- Coordinates: 47°28′52″N 19°07′50″E

Architecture
- Architect: Richárd Schöntheil
- Type: Synagogue architecture
- Style: Art Nouveau
- Established: 1907 (as a congregation)
- Completed: 1912

Specifications
- Direction of façade: East
- Dome: Three
- Materials: Stone and brick

The Kőbánya Synagogue is a former Neolog Jewish synagogue located at Cserkesz Street 7-9, in Kőbánya, in the Xth District of Budapest, Hungary. Completed in 1912, the building was used a synagogue until 1964 and, following restoration, has been used as a Pentecostal church since 1991, now known as the Temple of Everybody.

== History ==
The Art Nouveau-style building was designed by the Jewish community of Kőbánya in 1907 and built between 1909 and 1912 under the direction of architect Antal Sorg. At that time, the building stood out as one of the single storey houses.

Next to the Neolog synagogue is the rabbi building. The community also operated a Jewish private school, a charity for social purposes, a retirement home, and a folk kitchen for a hundred people. The roof burned down in 1920, but it was completely rebuilt that year. The synagogue was owned by the local Jewish community until 1964, when it was sold. It used to be a museum, later a theater, and then used as a warehouse for MTV. The building was declared protected in 1974, but by the 1980s its condition had deteriorated considerably.

The synagogue and its associated buildings were purchased in 1989 by the ecumenical, neo-Protestant Gospel Pentecostal Church of Zion (later renamed Everyone's Temple Church) and the People-Friendly Foundation. The former synagogue building was renovated through donations and volunteering, and was inaugurated in April 1991. Since then, the synagogue has housed religious and other cultural events in the Temple Church of All, while the former synagogue-related building houses the Human-Friendly Foundation's Alcohol and Drug Rehabilitation Institute.

== Description ==
The interior of the centrally located synagogue is octagonal, 22.15 metres (72.7 ft) in diameter with a smooth dome overhanging the walls at four points. Six cast-iron pillars hold the enclosed vault enclosed by a barrel vault.

The building has a hall of worship, foyers, warehouses, and a separate hall for the rabbi and cantor. The building and the fence are covered with quartz stones carved from hard limestone. In many places we can see Zsolnay pyrogranite elements. In the corners of the eastern façade are small towers. In the center of the flat-arched dome, a lantern surrounded by a balcony rises 32 metres (105 ft) high. It has colored, geometric stained glass windows. In the rose window you can see a Star of David, which indicates the original function. The main façade once had two stone slabs on its pediment, typical of synagogue buildings, but these have been removed to this day. Connected to its north side is a two-story courtyard building that used to serve as a community headquarters and residential building, and today cares for alcohol and drug patients.

== Gallery ==
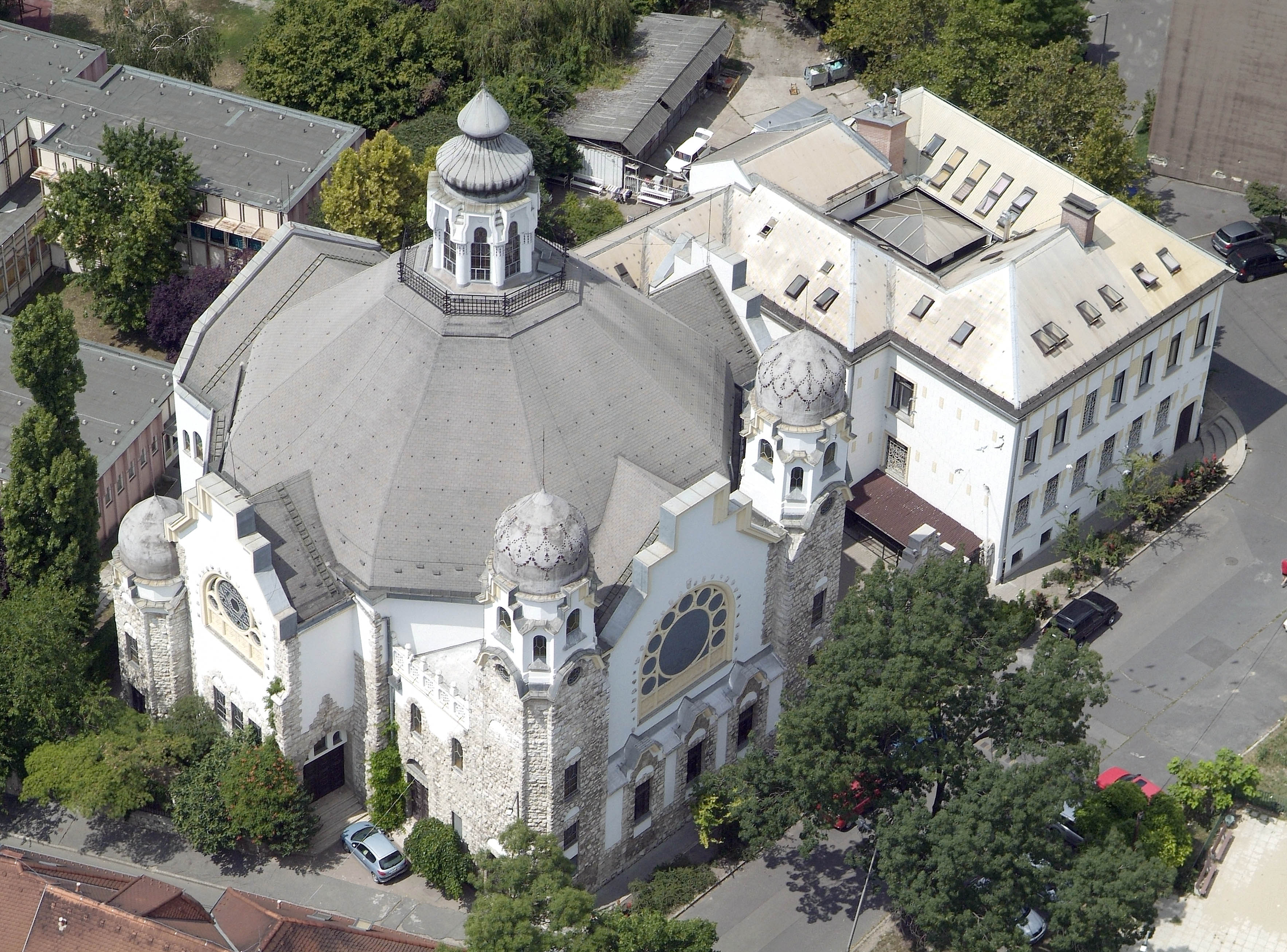

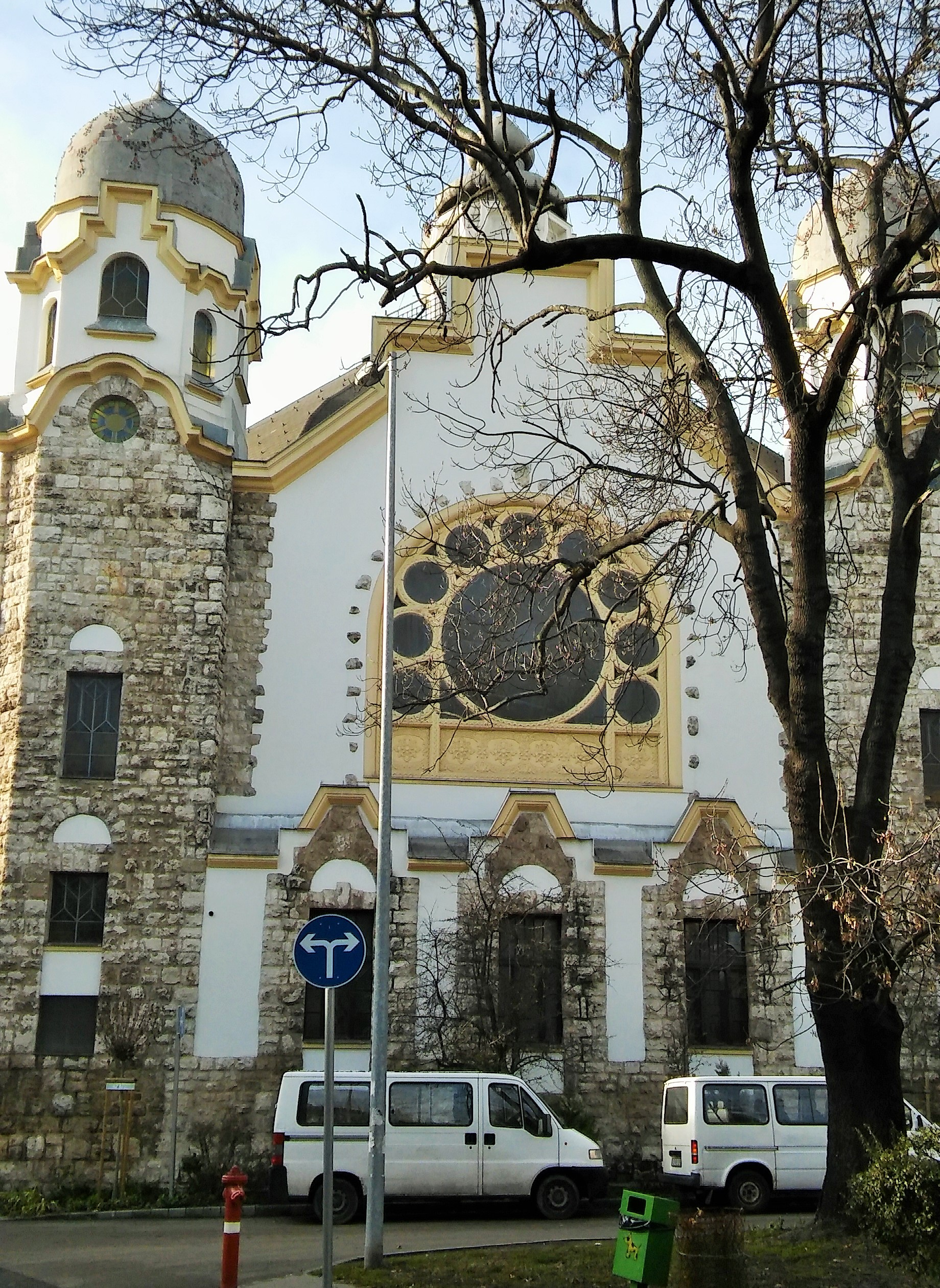

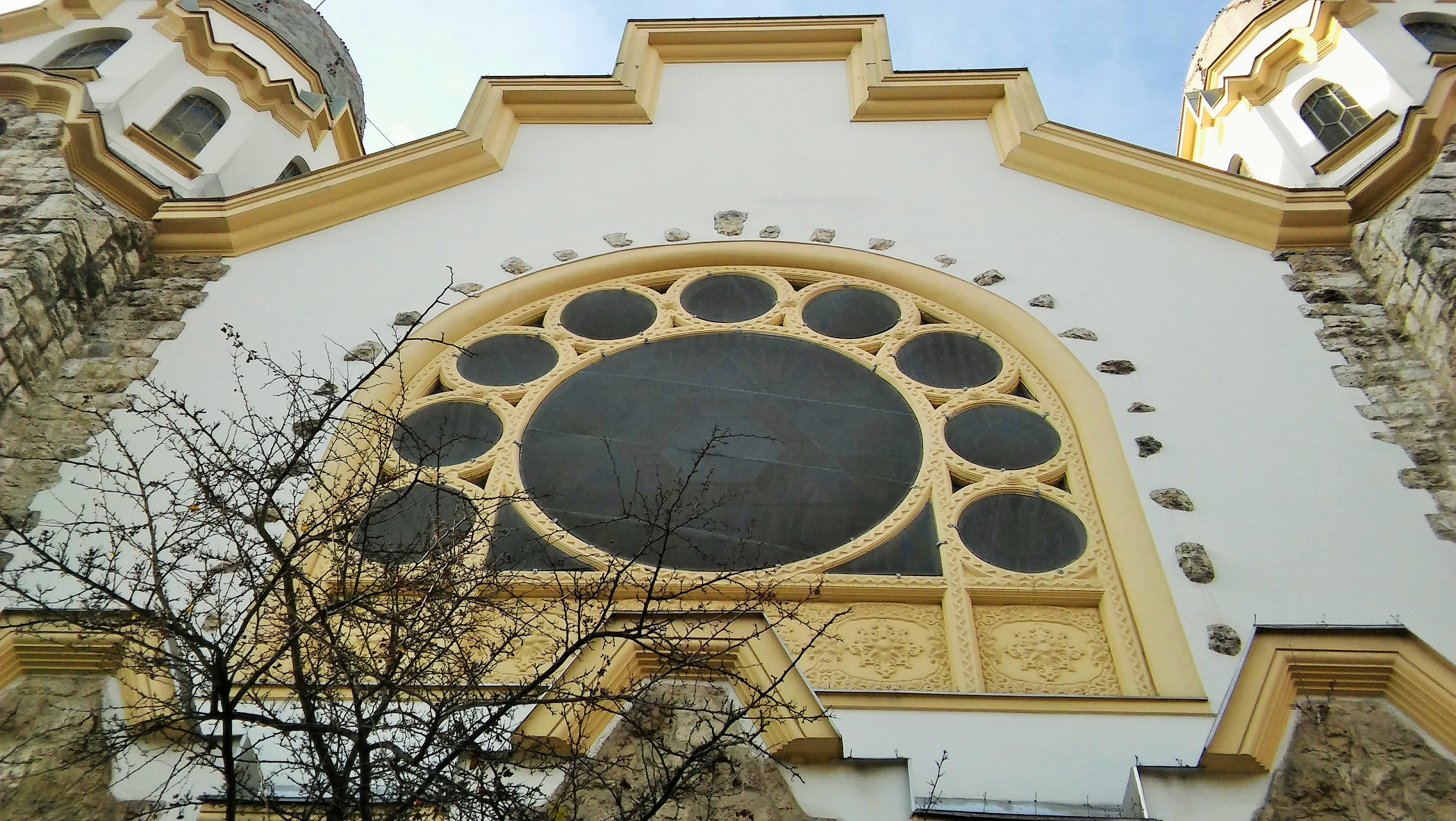

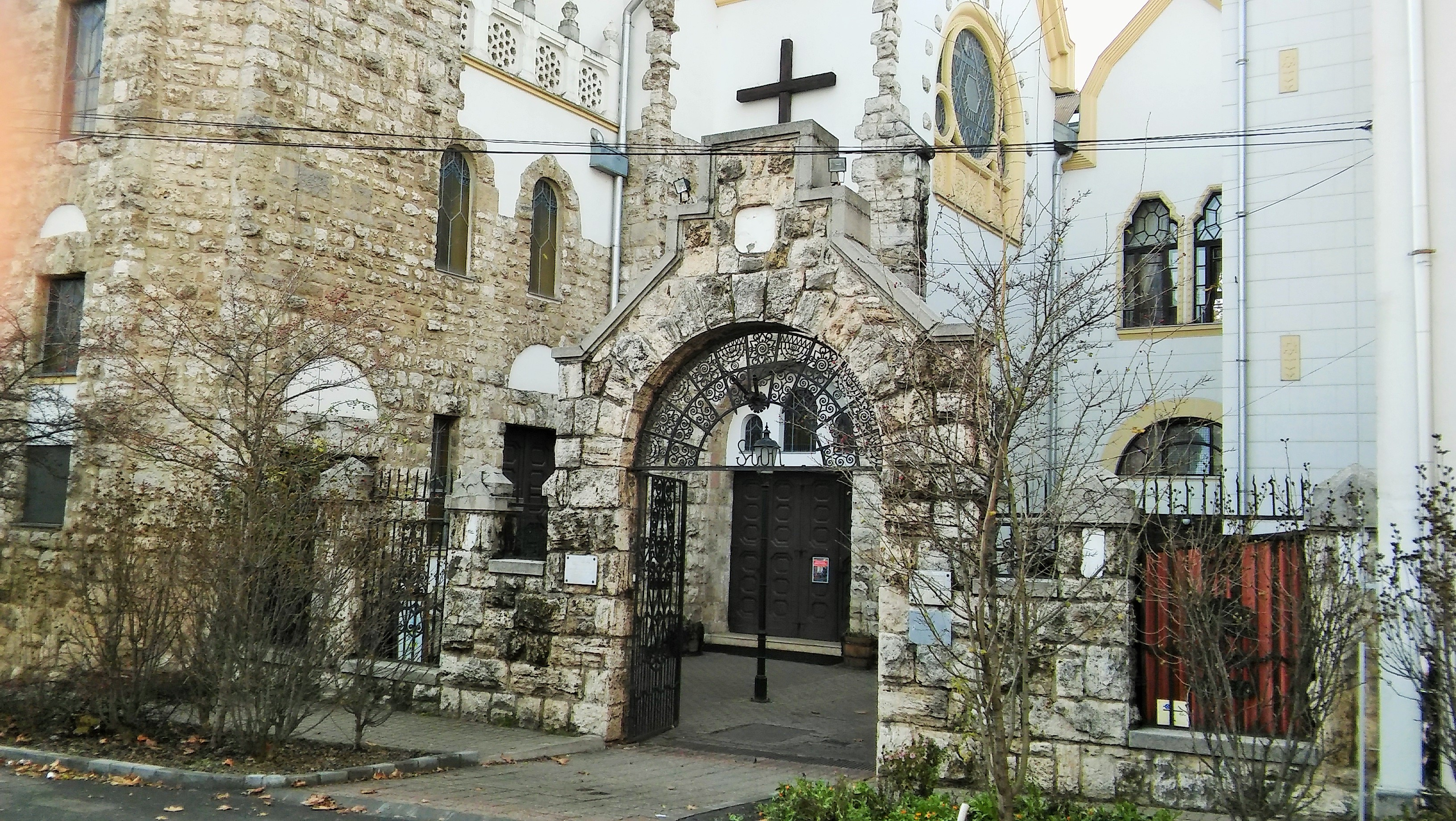

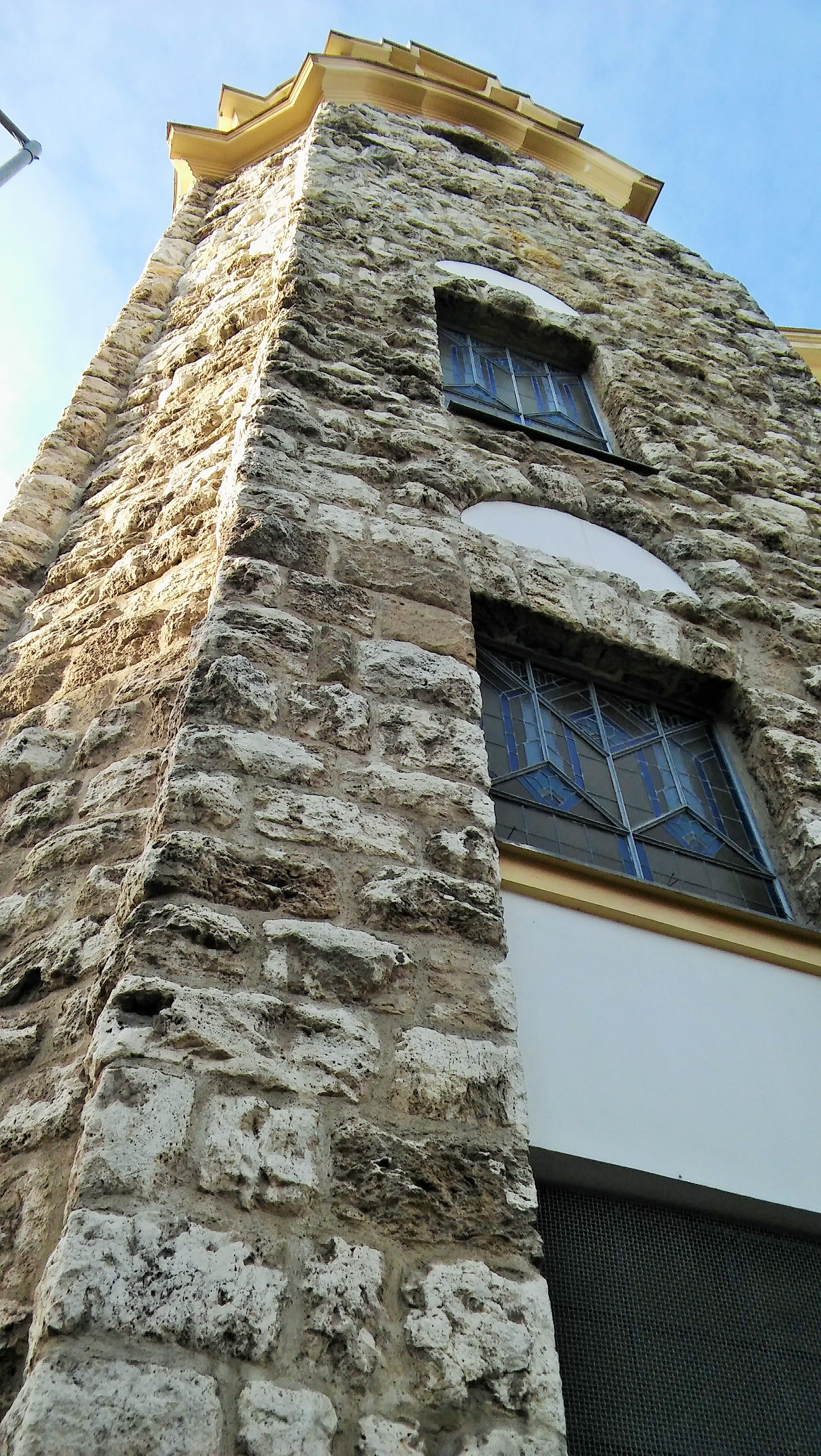

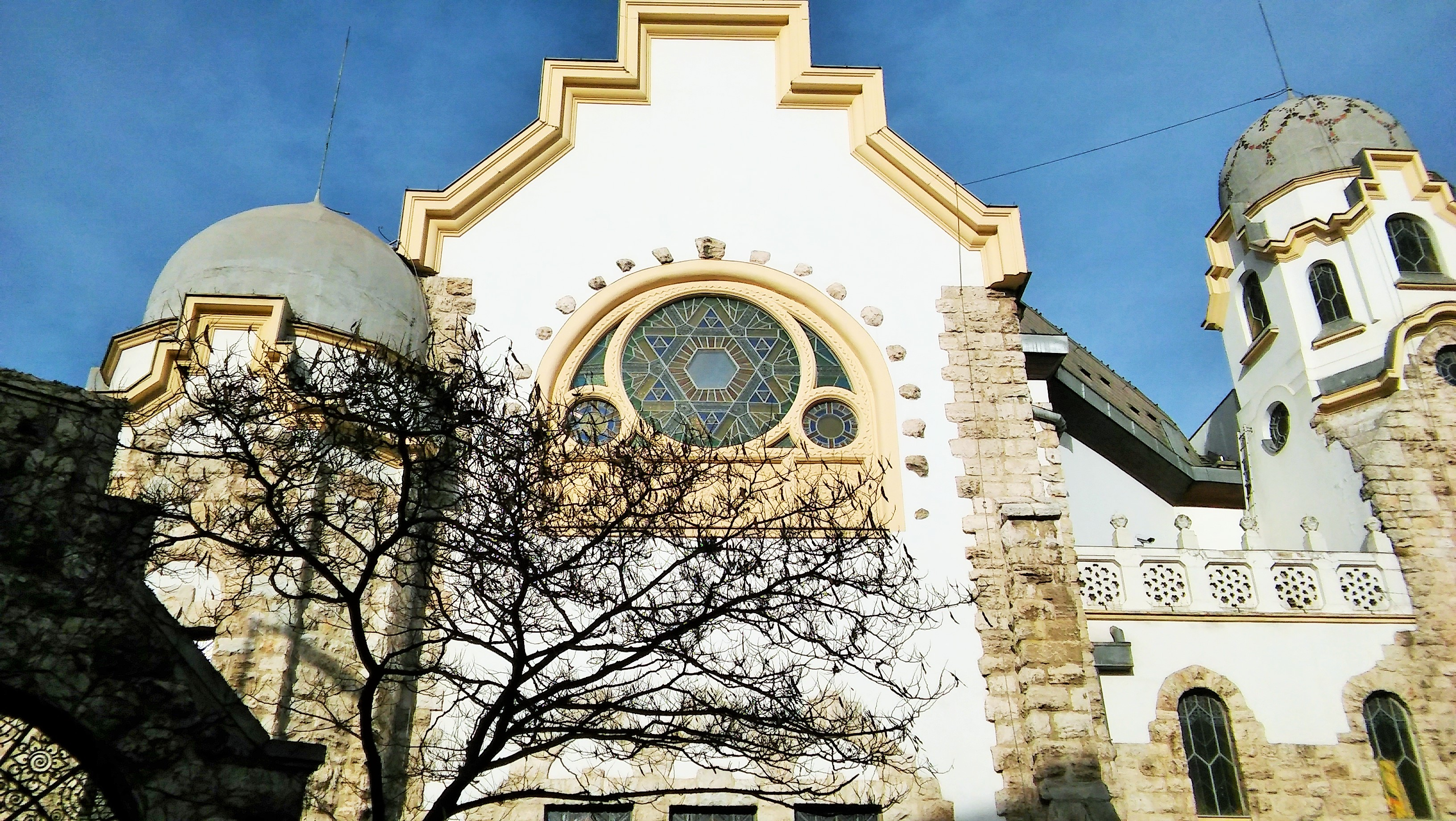

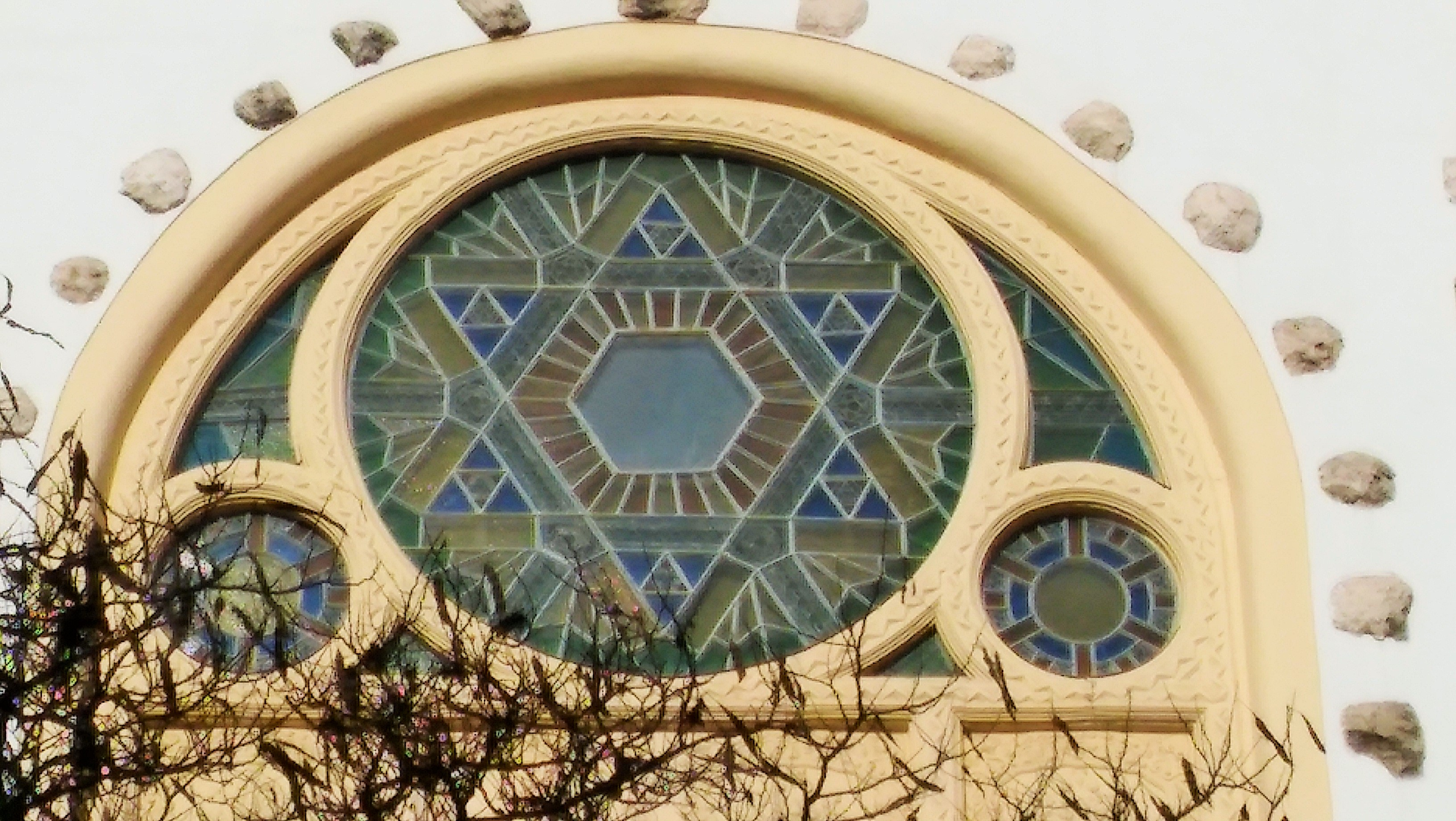

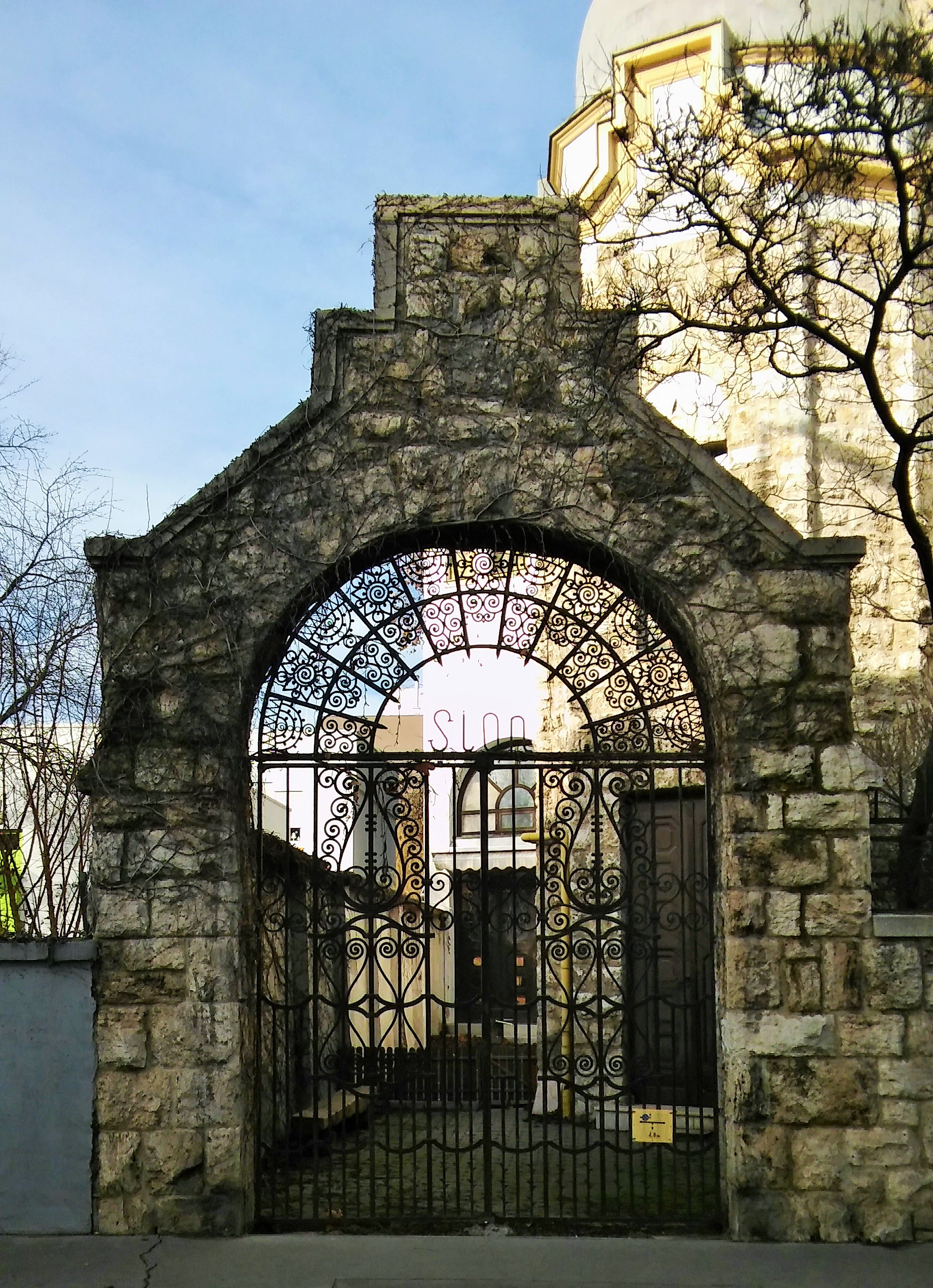

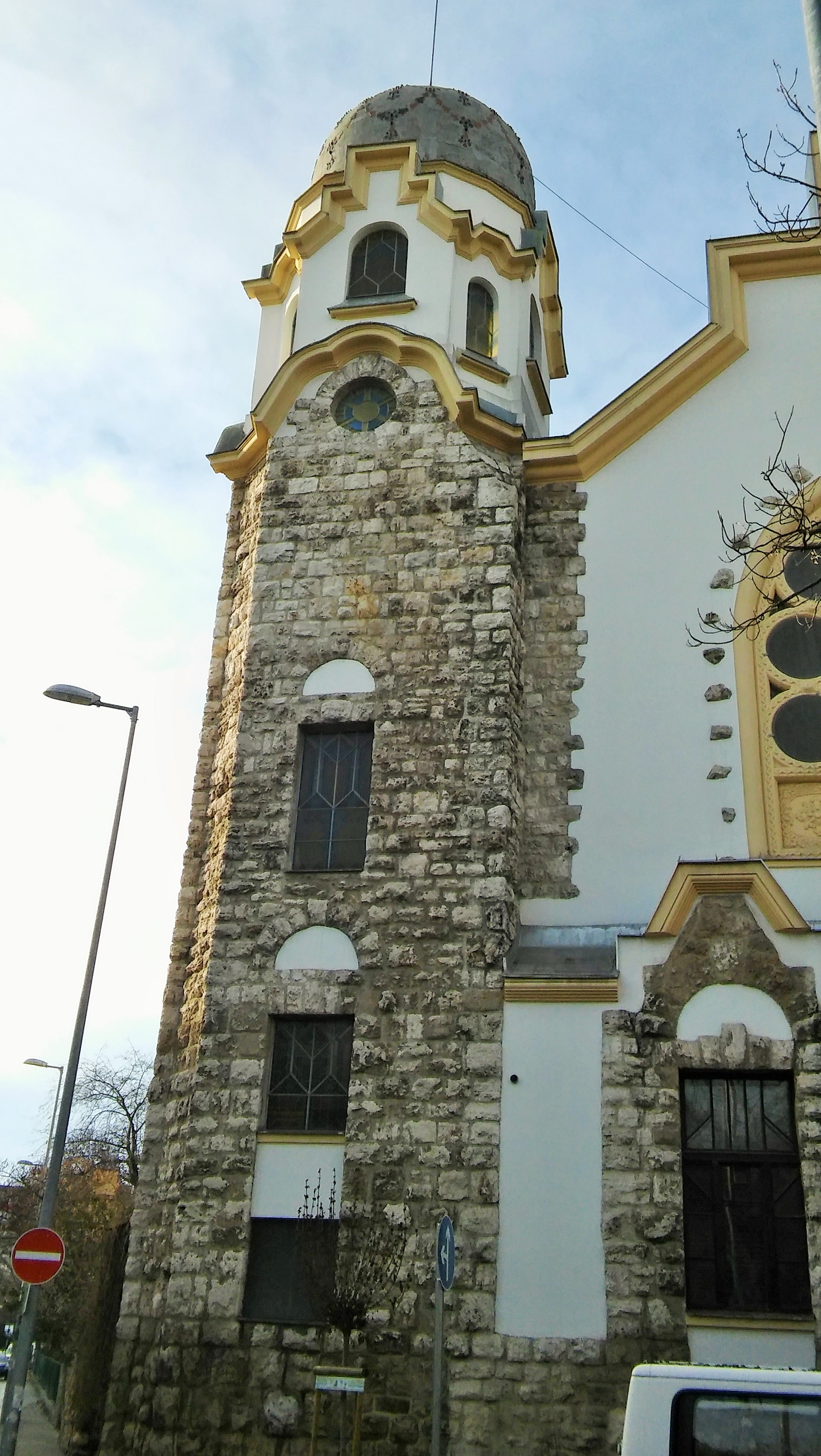

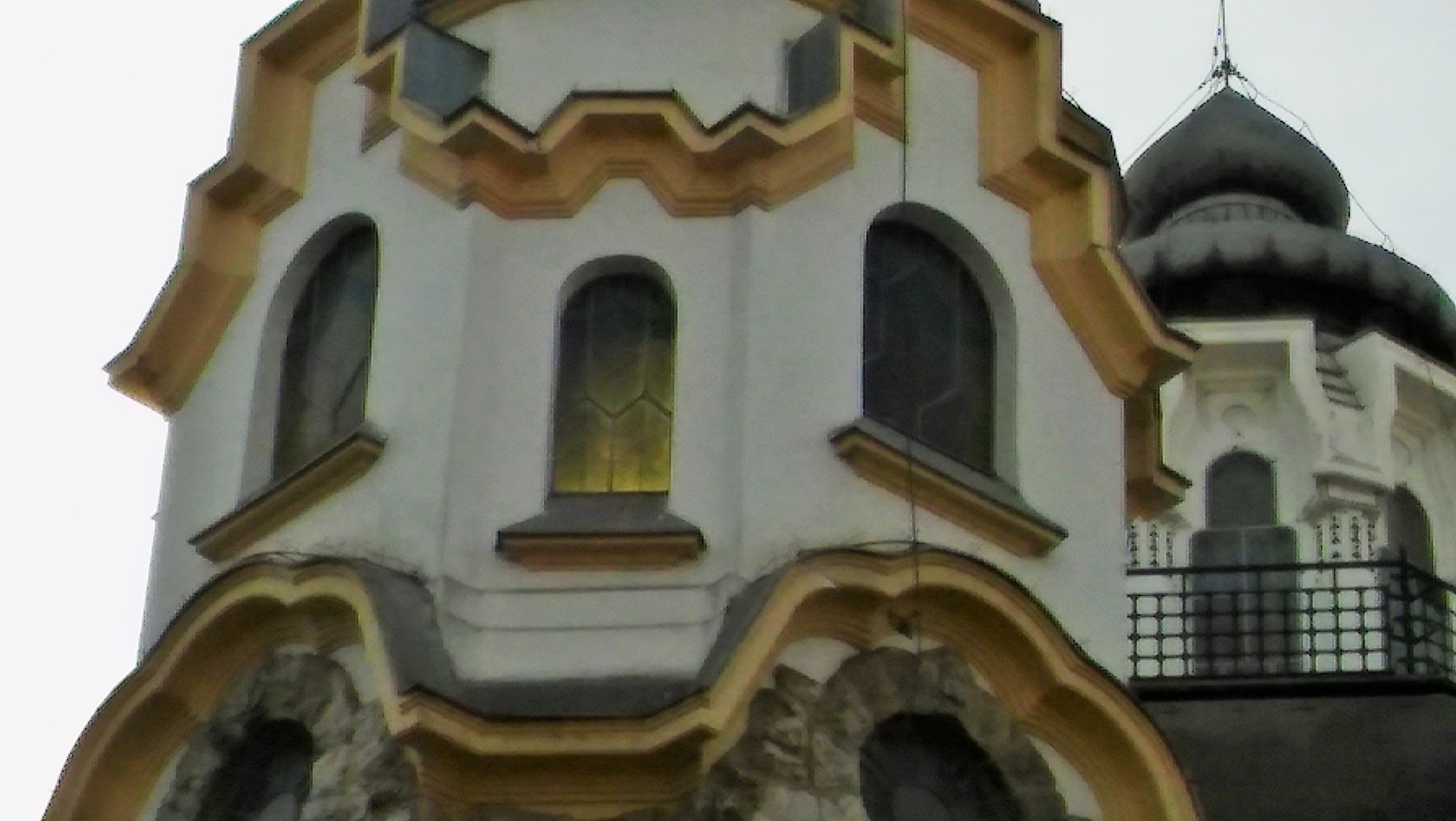

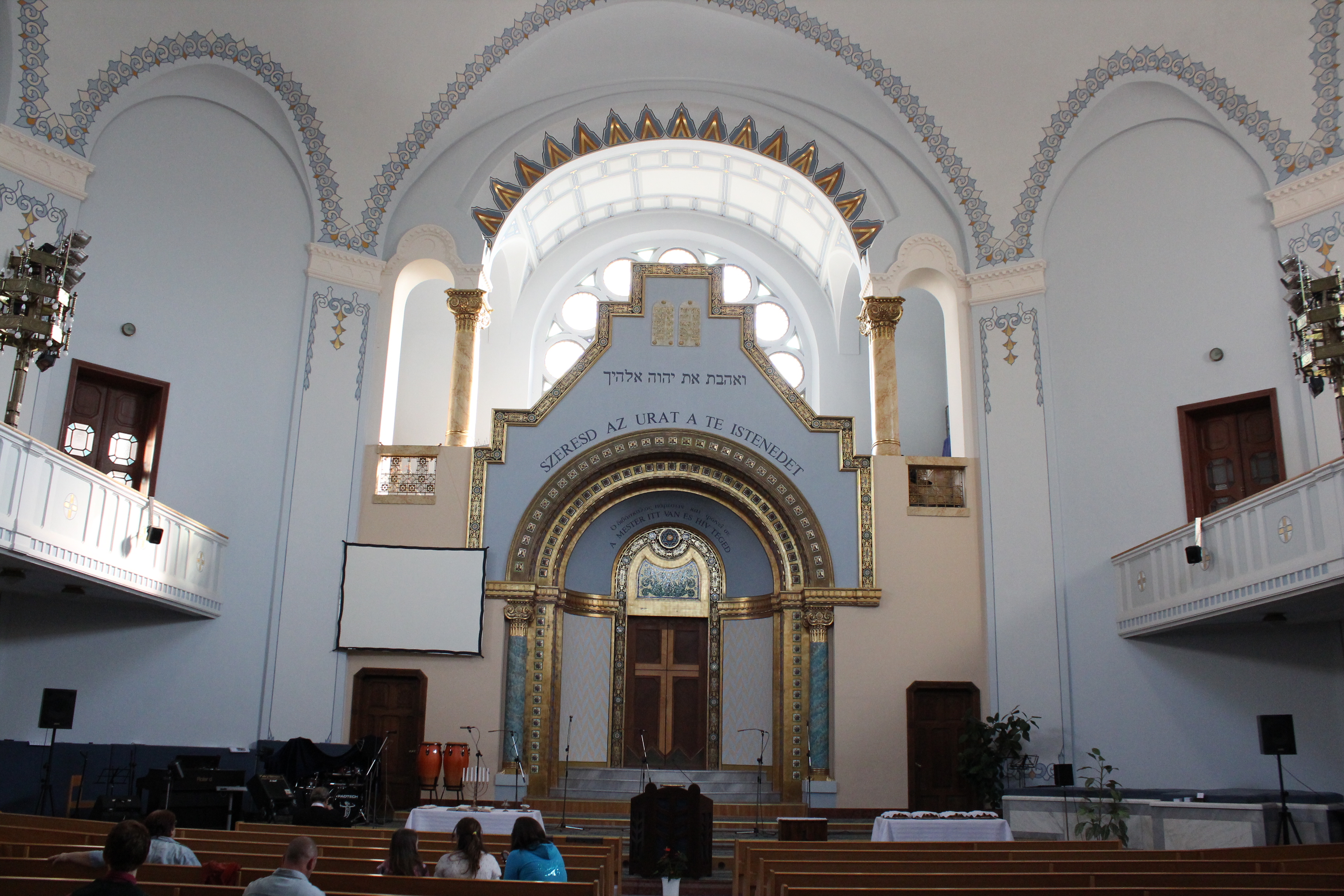

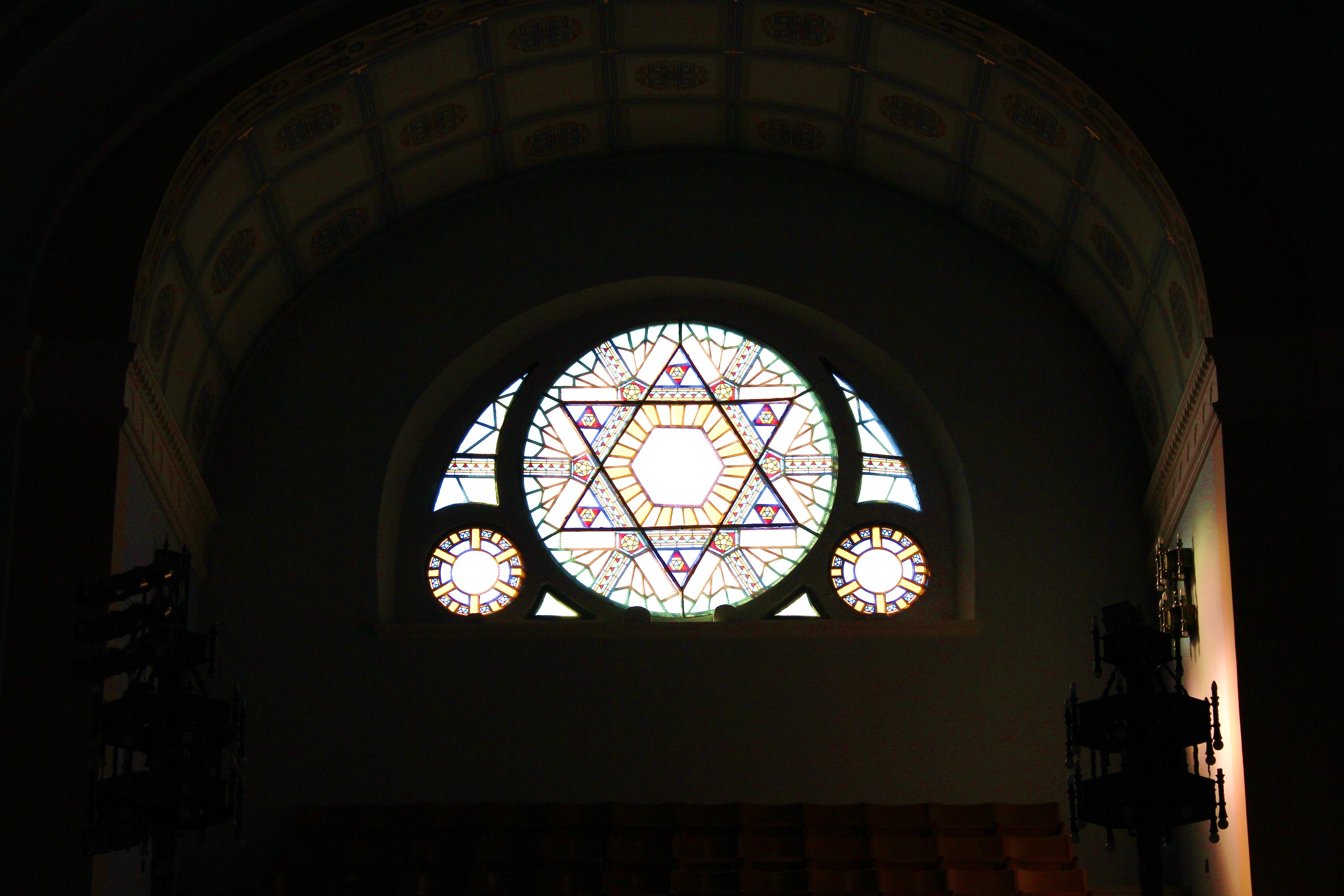

== See also ==
- History of the Jews in Hungary
- List of synagogues in Hungary
