= Makó Orthodox Synagogue =

Orthodox synagogue in Makó, Hungary

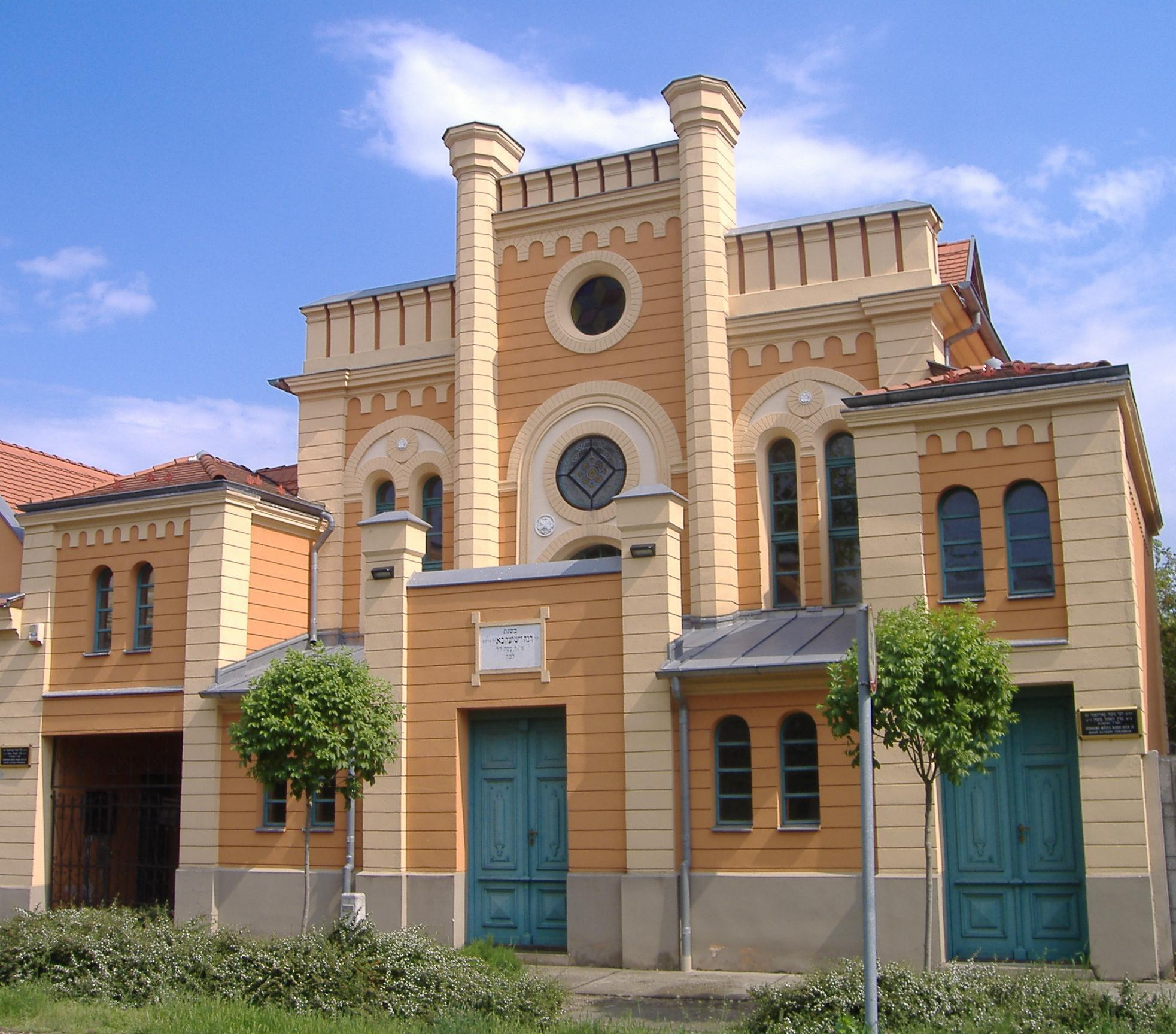
- The synagogue in 2008

- Location of the synagogue in Hungary

Religion
- Affiliation: Orthodox Judaism
- Rite: Nusach Ashkenaz
- Ecclesiastical or organizational status: Synagogue
- Status: Active

Location
- Location: 15 Eötvös Street, Makó, Csongrád-Csanád
- Country: Hungary
- Interactive map of Makó Orthodox Synagogue
- Coordinates: 46°13′04″N 20°28′39″E

Architecture
- Type: Synagogue architecture
- Style: Neo-Romantic
- Established: 1872 (as a congregation)
- Completed: 1895 (original); 2002 (renovation)

Specifications
- Length: 20 m (66 ft)
- Width: 9.3 m (31 ft)
- Materials: Brick

The Makó Orthodox Synagogue is an Orthodox Jewish congregation and synagogue, located in the town of Makó, in the county of Csongrád-Csanád, Hungary. It is the only remaining synagogue in the town and the second largest Orthodox synagogue in Hungary.

== History ==
The single-nave synagogue was built in 1895 in a Neo-Romantic style by the Orthodox community, which became independent in 1872. It fits harmoniously with the adjoining dwelling house, which Giba's map shows in 1824 as a Jewish house. At first it was used as a house of prayer, a fire pit, a caretaker's apartment. After the reconstruction of the Orthodox synagogue, it was transformed into a winter prayer hall as it was heated.

Its façade is staggered, has a triple structure, and the building itself has a northwest–southeast orientation. Arch rows, cornices and square toothed wall planes function as horizontal dividing elements. External dimension is 9.3 by 20 meters (31 ft × 66 ft). There are two extensions to the facade, the choir driveway and the courtyard driveway. In front of it is a half-roof entrance. In the inner courtyard there is a memorial park with memorial plaques to the martyrs.

Inside, on a brick platform, stands the bima, or Torah reading table, surrounded by a wrought-iron lattice. The Torah platform was built on the east wall of the synagogue. The ornate painting on the wall shows the lions of Judah holding the stone tablets of Moses in their paws. Golden stars were painted on the ceiling to symbolize the sky. The interior of the building was later expanded with a double porch.

The building was in a very poor, near-life-threatening condition by the 1990s. In 1999, a decision was made to restore it. A year later, with the support of the then Hungarian government, the local government of the city of Makó and MAZSIHISZ, as well as the donation of the faithful, the renovation started in the amount of HUF 80 million. The renovated building of the synagogue was handed over on March 10, 2002.

== See also ==
- History of the Jews in Hungary
- List of synagogues in Hungary
