= Frankel Leo street Synagogue, Budapest =

Neolog synagogue in Budapest, Hungary

Frankel Leo Street Synagogue
- Hungarian: Frankel Leó utcai zsinagóga
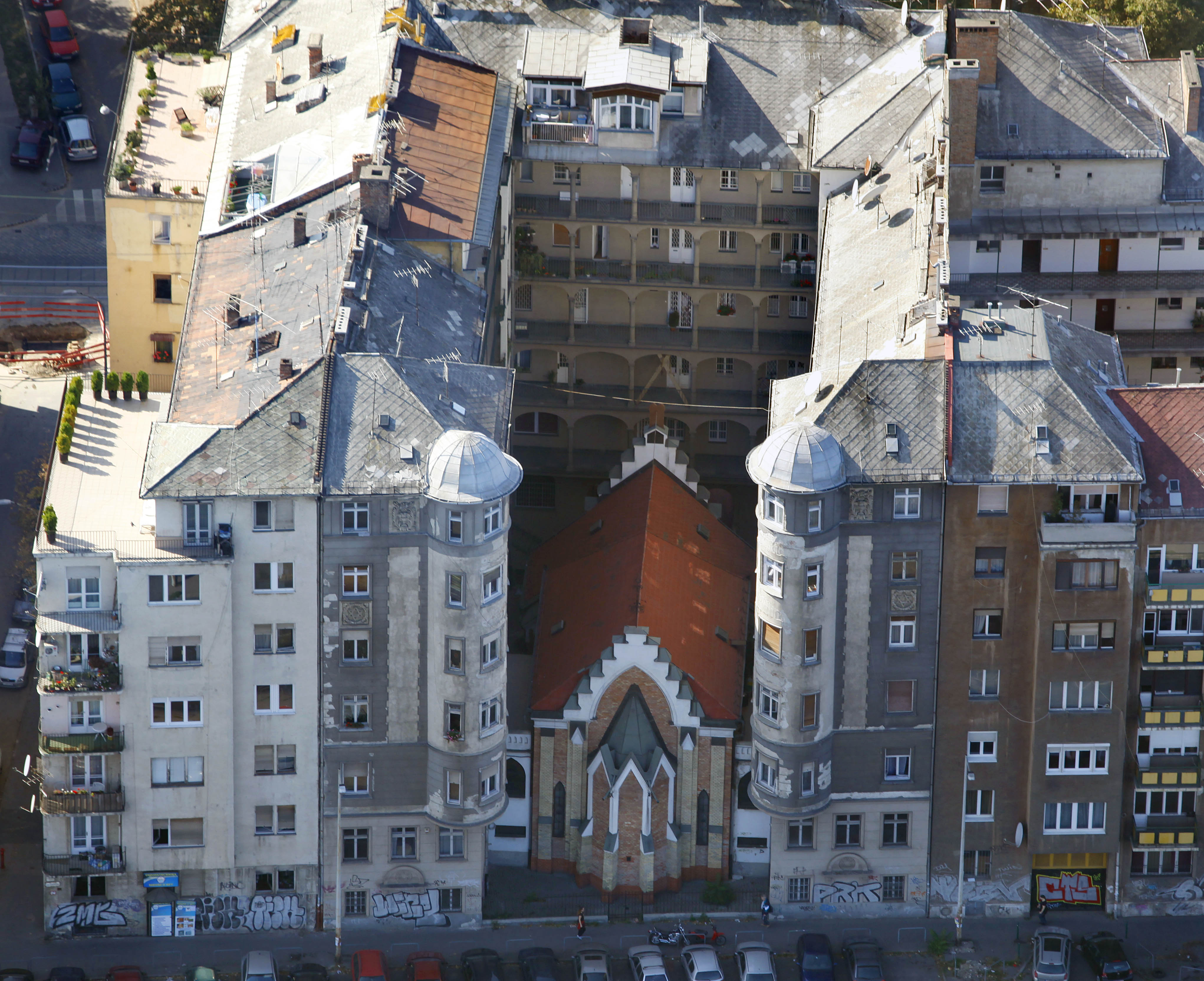
- An aerial view of the synagogue in 2010

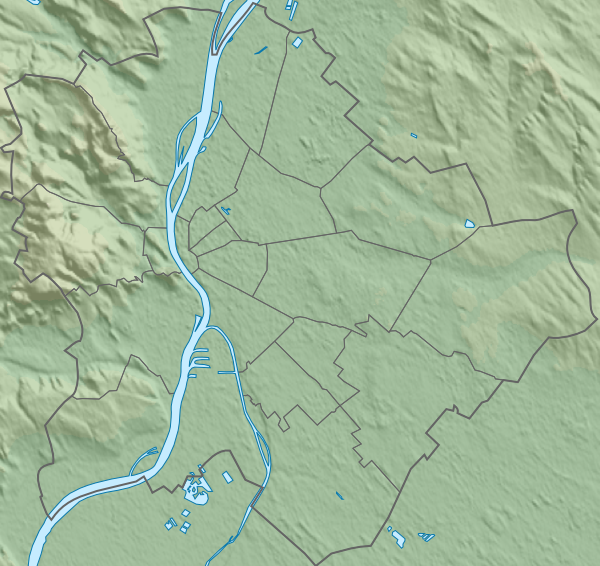
- Location of the synagogue in Budapest

Religion
- Affiliation: Neolog Judaism
- Rite: Nusach Ashkenaz
- Ecclesiastical or organizational status: Synagogue
- Leadership: Rabbi Tamas Vero
- Status: Active

Location
- Location: 49 Frankel Leo Street, Újpest, Buda, 2nd district, Budapest
- Country: Hungary
- Interactive map of Frankel Leo Street Synagogue
- Coordinates: 47°31′18″N 19°02′14″E

Architecture
- Architects: 1888: Sándor Fellner; 1928: Dezső Jakab; Aladár Soós
- Type: Synagogue architecture
- Style: Gothic Revival
- General contractor: Gyula Wellisch
- Completed: 1888 (original); 1928 (modifications); 2000 (further renovations)

Specifications
- Capacity: 400 worshippers
- Materials: Brick

Website
- frankel.hu

The Frankel Leo Street Synagogue (Hungarian: Frankel Leó utcai zsinagóga) or Újlaki Synagogue, is a Neolog Jewish congregation and synagogue, located at 49 Frankel Leo Street, in Újpest, on the Buda side of the 2nd district of Budapest, Hungary. The congregation worships in the Ashkenazi rite.

== History ==
The synagogue was built in 1888. In the 1920s a block building was built around it to protect it and to serve as a community building. During World War II, the synagogue was used as a stable and the residents were all killed. Today the Jewish community owns only one apartment in the building and gentiles live in the building. There is a memorial in the yard with the names of the Jewish families who were deported from the house in 1944.

== Community ==
There is a vibrant Jewish community life in the Frankel synagogue, included Family Kabalat Shabbat, Sunday School, adult educational programs, BBYO youth movement for teens, holiday celebrations and cultural events serve the needs of the members. About 350 young families and 150 elders belong to the community.

== Gallery ==
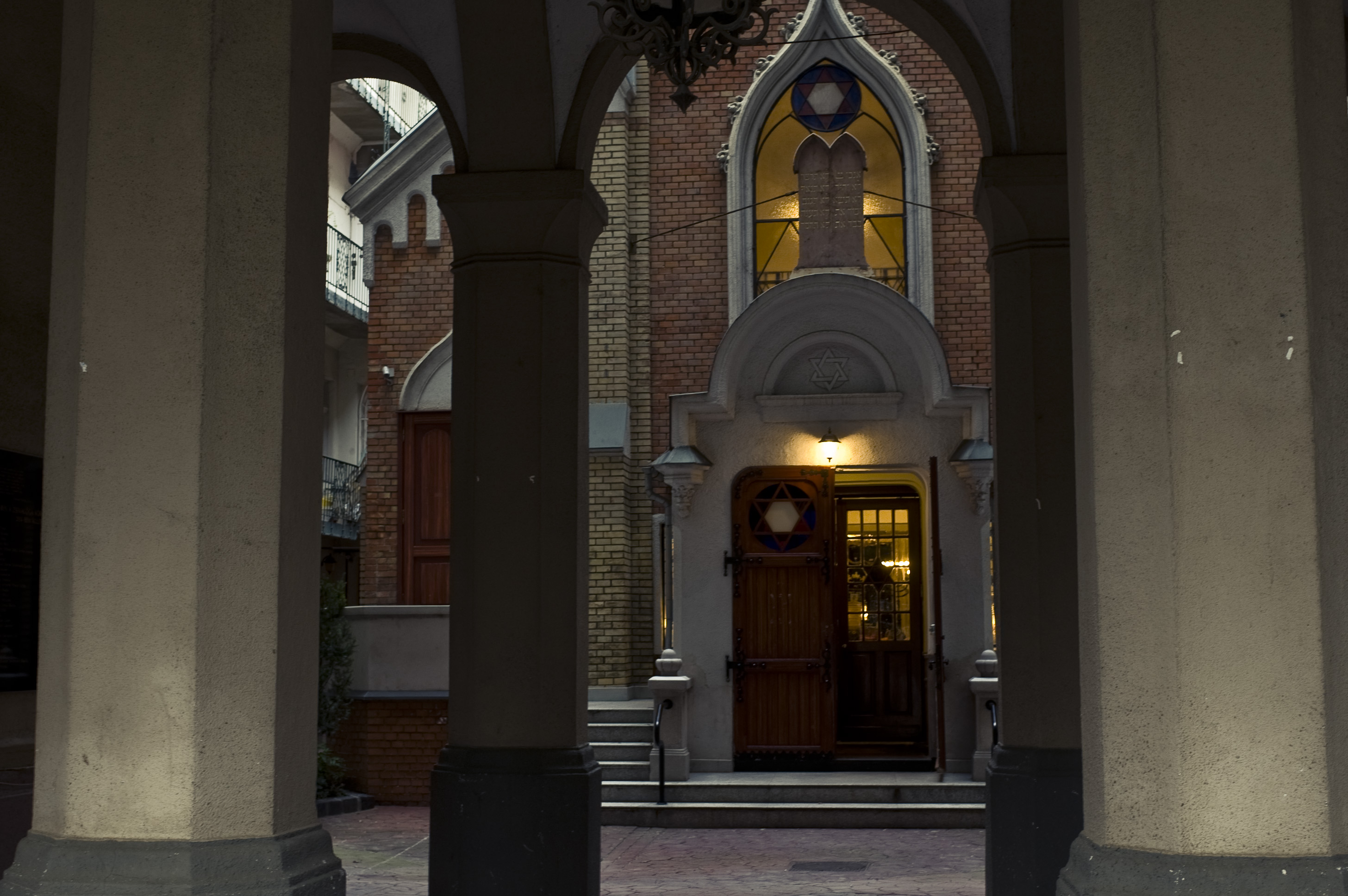
Synagogue interior

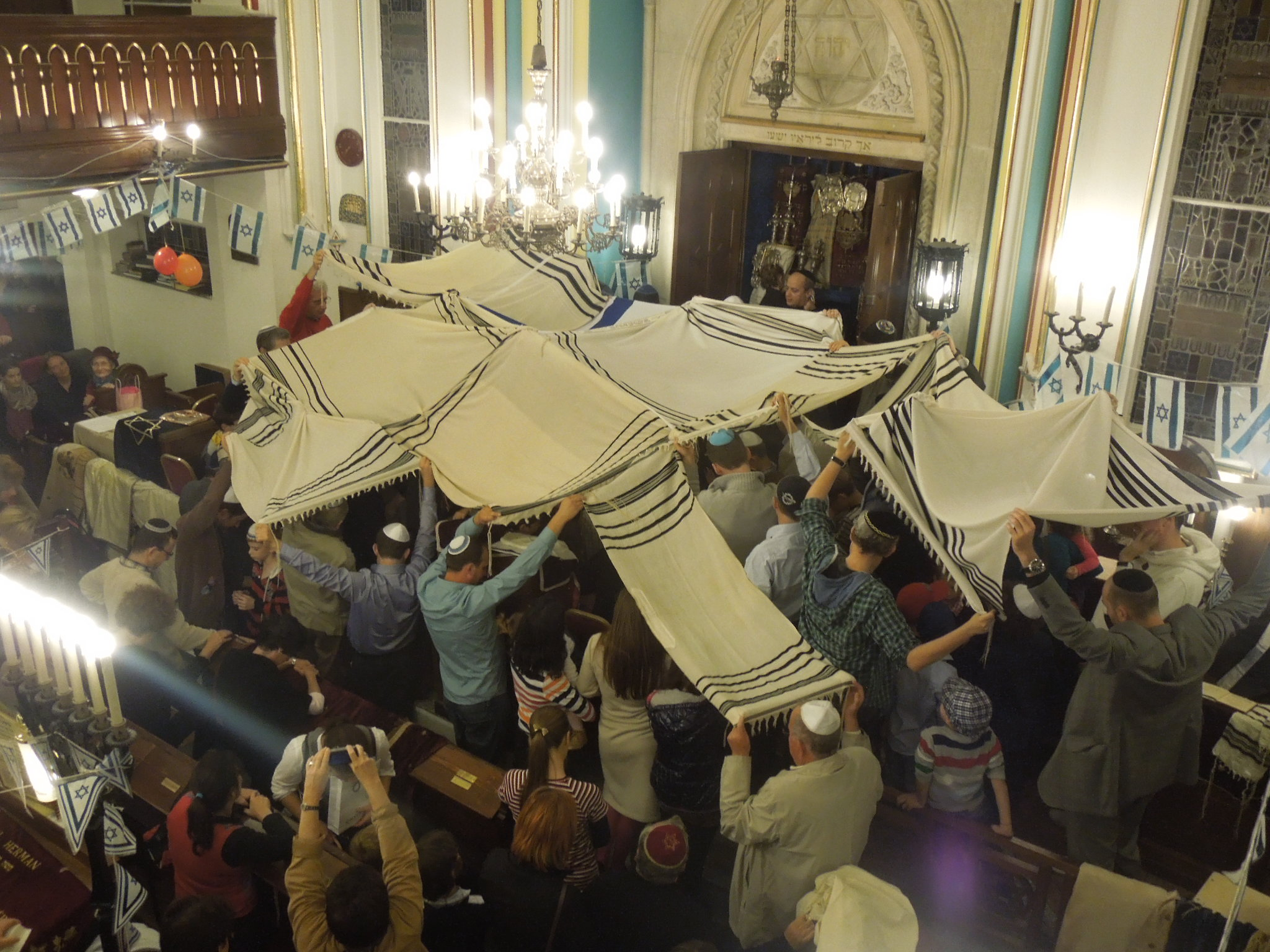
Blessing the children

== See also ==
- History of the Jews in Hungary
- List of synagogues in Hungary
