= Keszthely Synagogue =

Neolog synagogue in Keszthely, Hungary

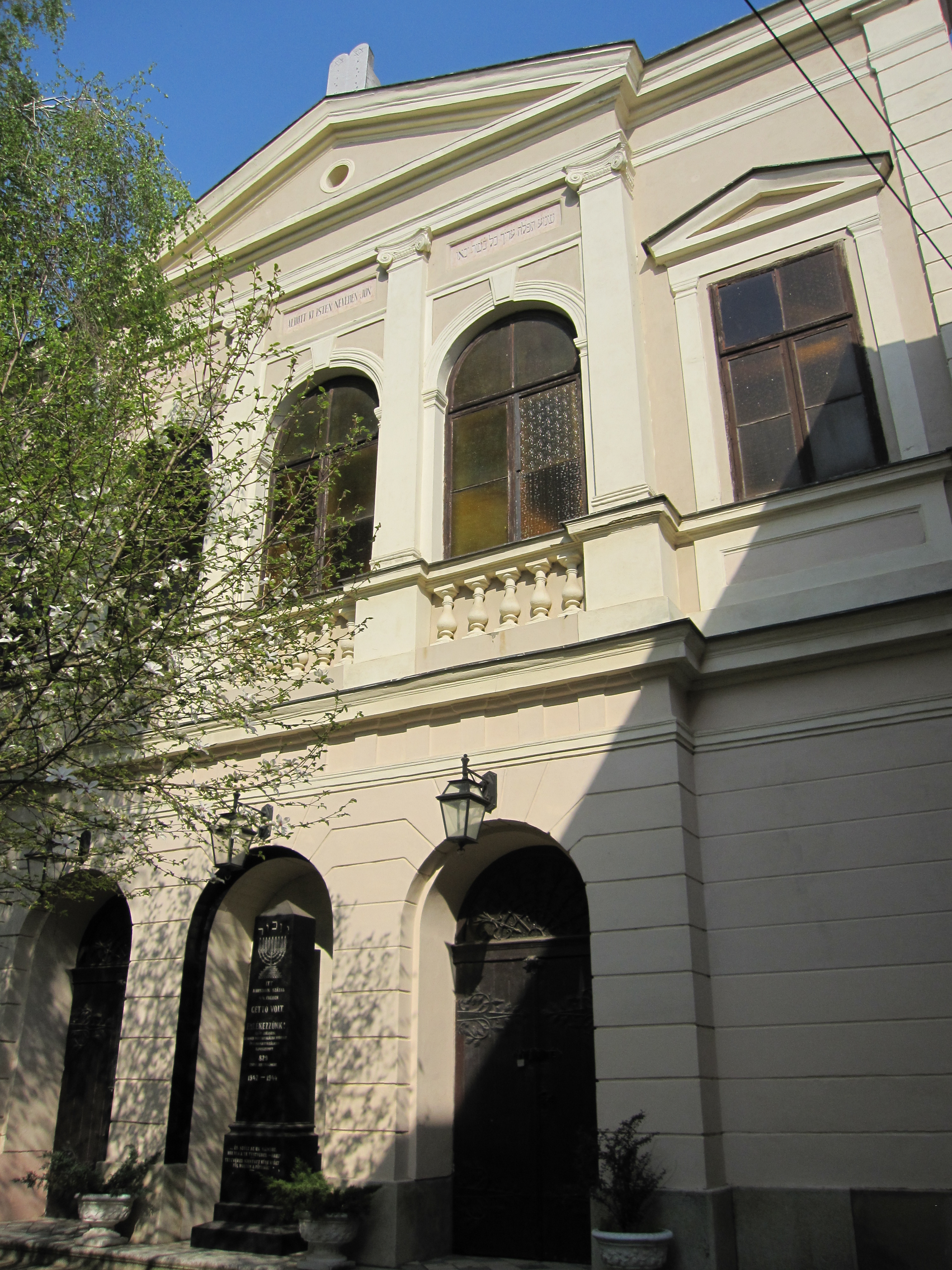
- The synagogue in 2009

- Location of the synagogue in Hungary

Religion
- Affiliation: Neolog Judaism
- Rite: Nusach Ashkenaz
- Ecclesiastical or organizational status: Synagogue
- Status: Active

Location
- Location: via 22 Kossuth Lajos Street, Keszthely, Zala
- Country: Hungary
- Interactive map of Keszthely Synagogue
- Coordinates: 46°46′01″N 17°14′35″E

Architecture
- Type: Synagogue architecture
- Style: Neo-classical; Eclectic
- Established: 18th century (as a congregation)
- Completed: 1852 (original); 1894 (remodelled); 1995 (renovations)

Specifications
- Direction of façade: West
- Materials: Brick

The Keszthely Synagogue is a Neolog Jewish congregation and synagogue, located in the town of Keszthely, in the county of Zala, Hungary. Completed in 1852 in the neo-classical style, the shape of the synagogue building was altered in 1894 when the building was remodeled in the spirit of eclecticism. In 1898 an organ built by Sándor Országh was installed.

The building has undergone a number of renovations - in 1930, in 1945 and in 1967. In 1987 part of the ceiling collapsed and as a result planning began in 1991 to fully renovate the building. Full renovation work started in 1993, and the synagogue was reconsecrated on July 7, 1995 in the presence of the President of the Republic Árpád Göncz and the Chief Rabbi Tamás Raj. In 1997 its painted decorations and work on the facade was also completed.

== History ==
=== The congregation ===
The first Jews settled in what is now the town of Keszthely in the early 18th century. According to the town census, there were seven Jewish families by 1745. A functioning Jewish community was established in Keszthely in 1766. A map of 1769 depicts an oblong house of Jews on the main street with a chapel in the yard. The community erected a synagogue on this site designed by architect Christopher Hofstadter. In 1812, the Jewish community purchased the building from the domain and in 1852 built the current building in its place.

The cemetery used by the congregation is located at 33 Goldmark Károly Street.

=== Synagogue site ===
A building and the surrounding land on which the synagogue now stands had been owned by the Pethő family who acquired it by royal donation in 1427. In 1739 it was purchased by Christopher Festetics. The Pethő House located on Kossuth Lajos Street #22, and through which the synagogue is currently accessed, is the oldest building in Keszthely and is also notable as being the birthplace of composer Károly Goldmark in 1830. Károly Goldmark's father was the cantor at the synagogue.

=== World War II ===
During World War II, the Germans used the synagogue as a warehouse and later as a stall, they also destroyed the organ. During the war, 829 members of the Keszthely Jewish congregation were murdered. Today, the names of these individuals are inscribed on 102 marble plates that hang around the inside perimeter of the synagogue. A black obelisk in front of the synagogue acts as a memorial for the ghetto that also occupied the same land. The members of the ghetto were taken first to Zalaegerszeg and then to Auschwitz, the first train arriving there on July 8, 1944.

== The building ==
The building was originally accessed via a narrow mew from Fejér György Street where the Jewish School once stood. Today it is accessed through the archway of Pethő House located on Kossuth Lajos Street #22.

The building was erected according to tradition on a lower level as compared to its surroundings. Its East-West length, breadth and height are almost equal. The inside is surrounded on three sides by a gallery for women supported by iron columns. The original neo-classical architecture is still preserved on the East side of the synagogue.

== Gallery ==
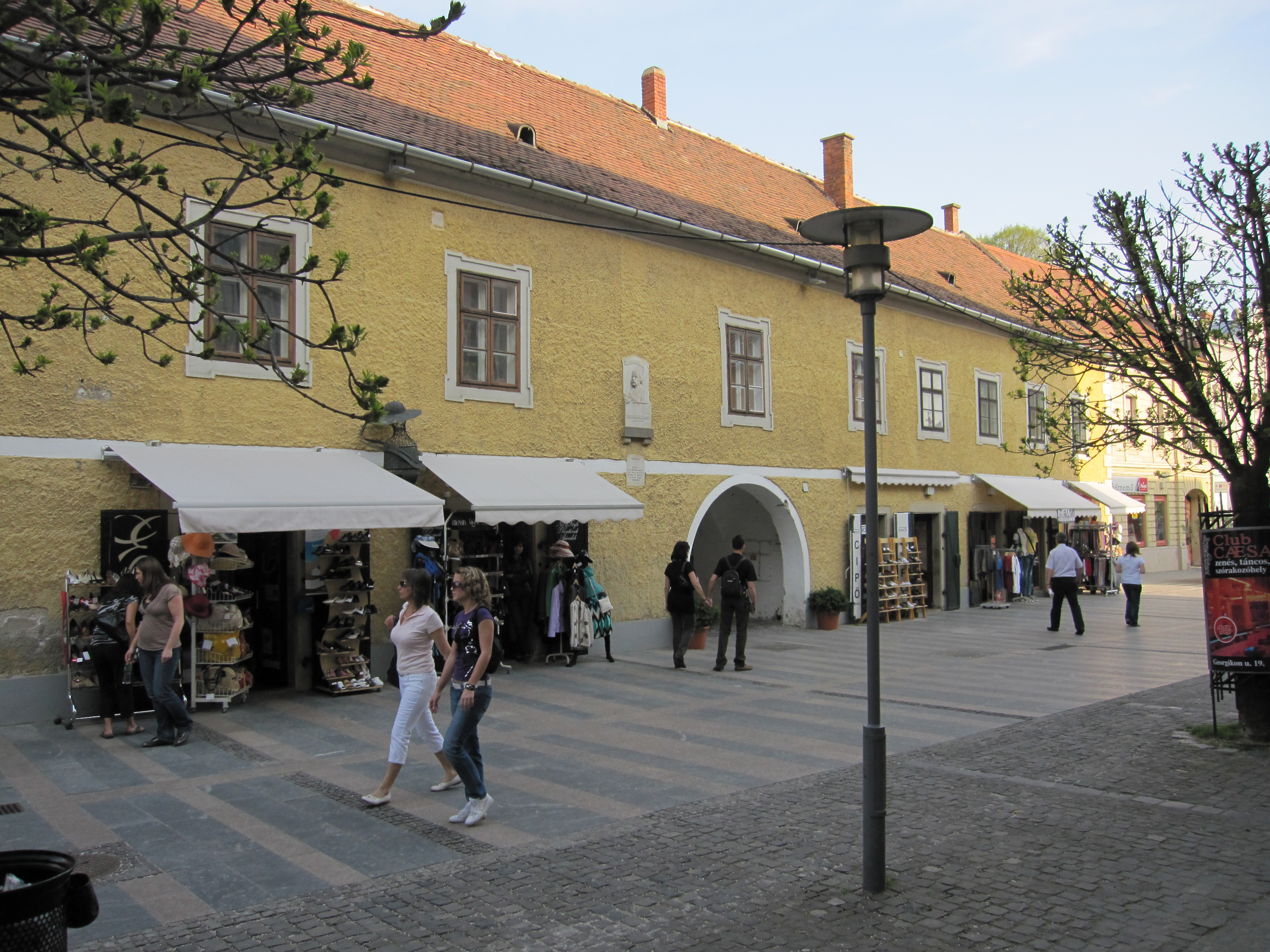
Archway of the Pethő House located on Kossuth Lajos Street #22 through which the Keszthely Synagogue is accessed

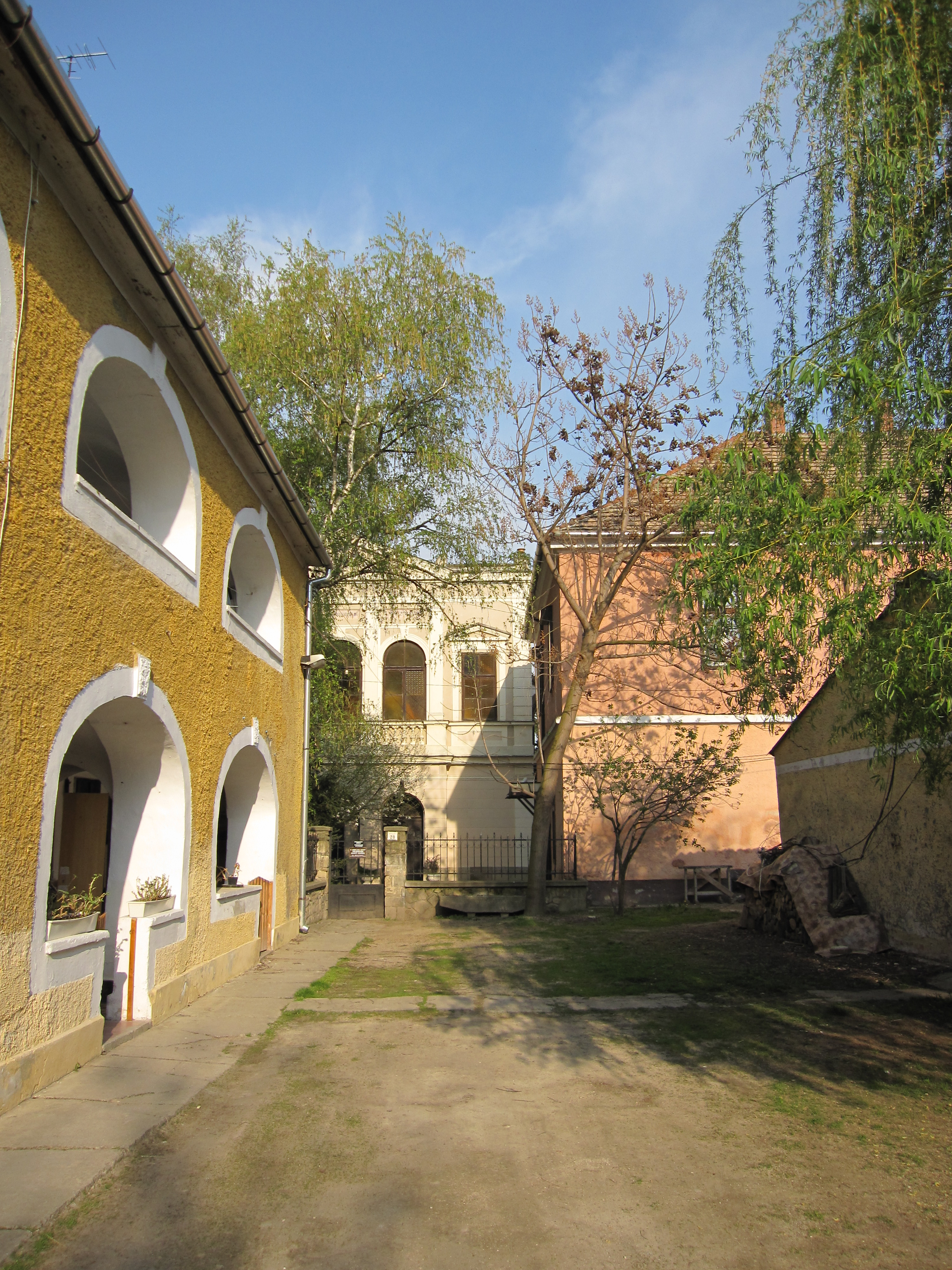
Keszthely Synagogue as seen from the courtyard of the Pethő House

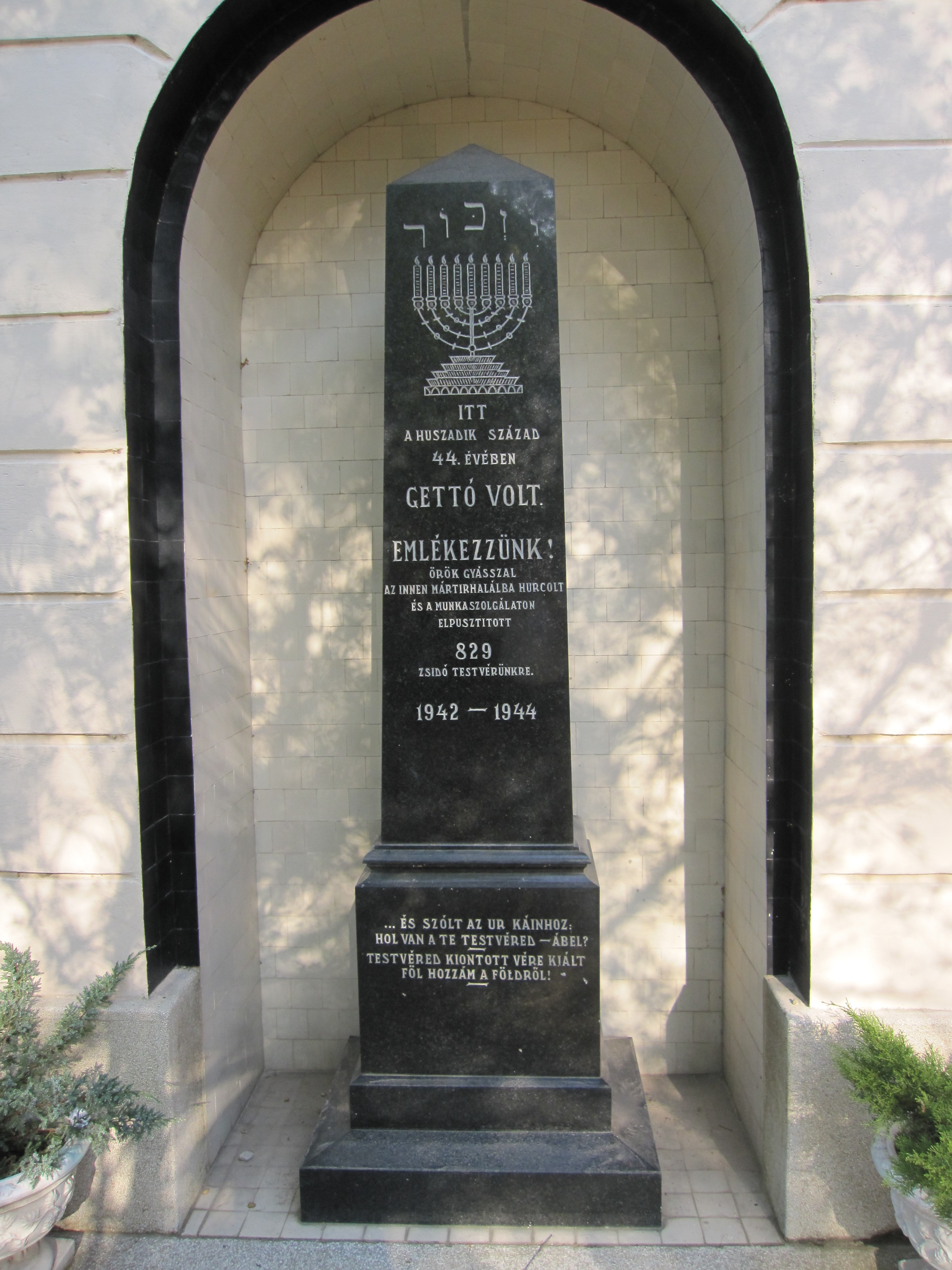
Memorial Obelisk of the Keszthely Synagogue

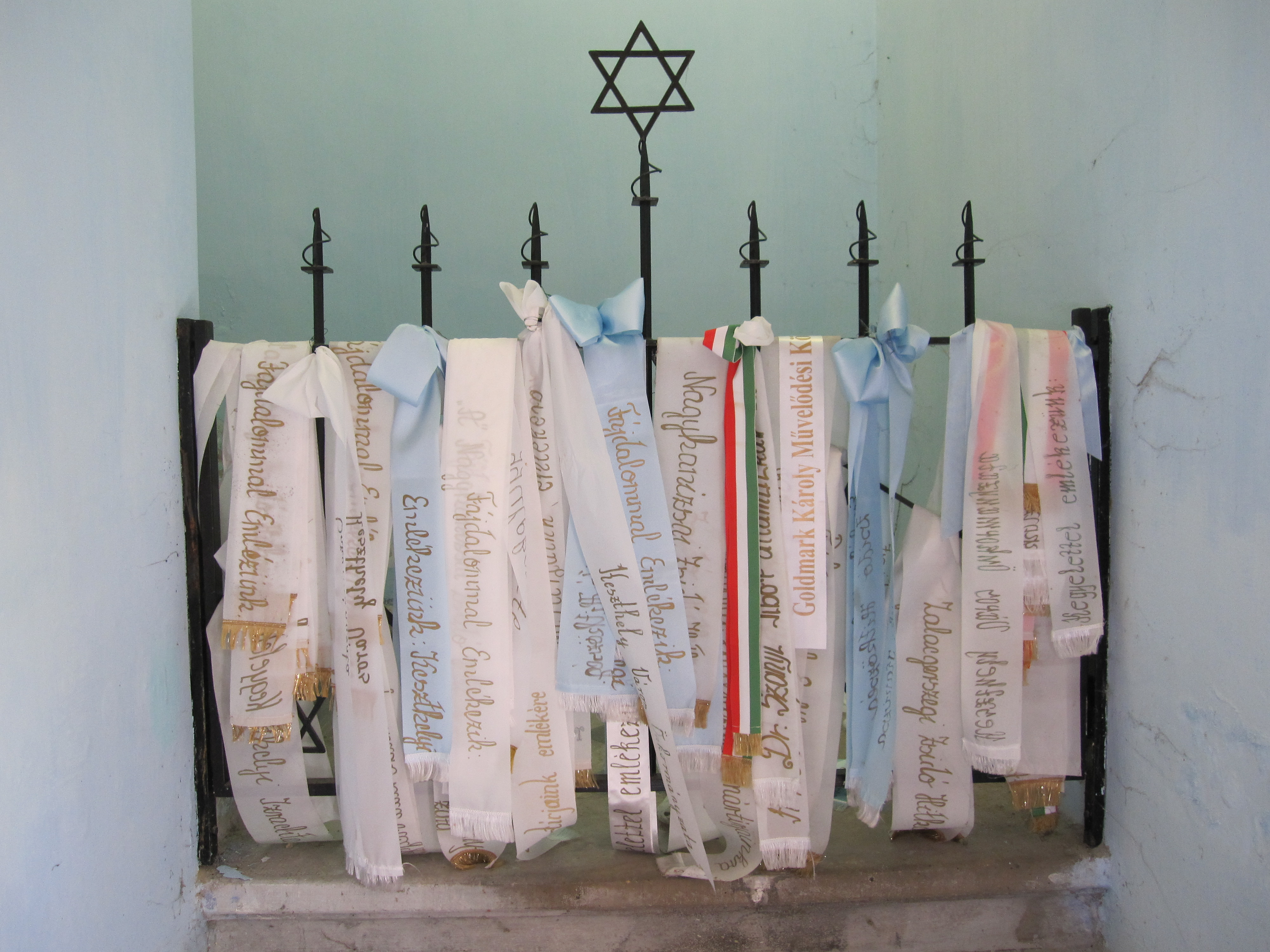
Bottom of Stairway in Keszthely Synagogue

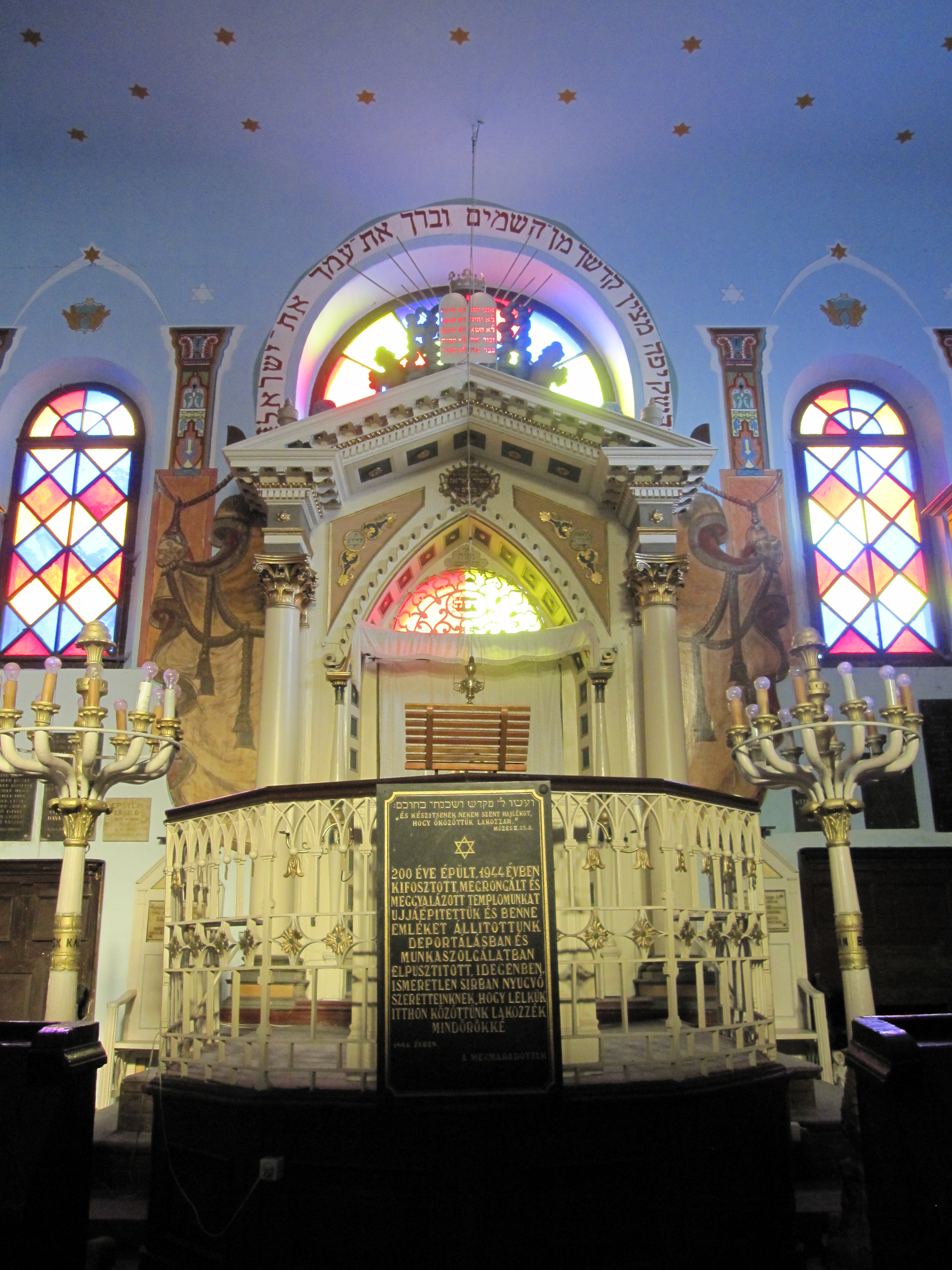
Bimah of Keszthely Synagogue

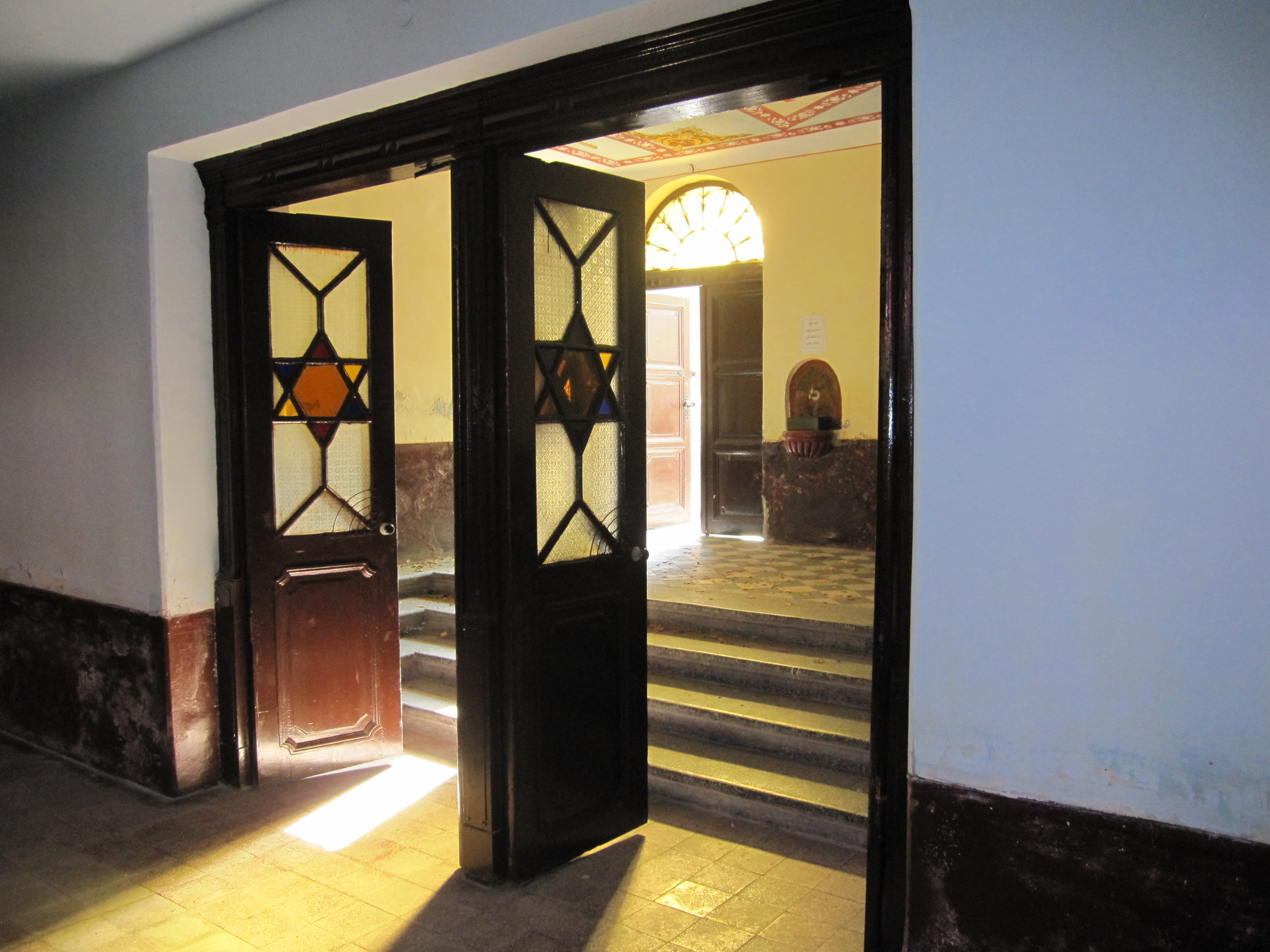
Rear of Keszthely Synagogue

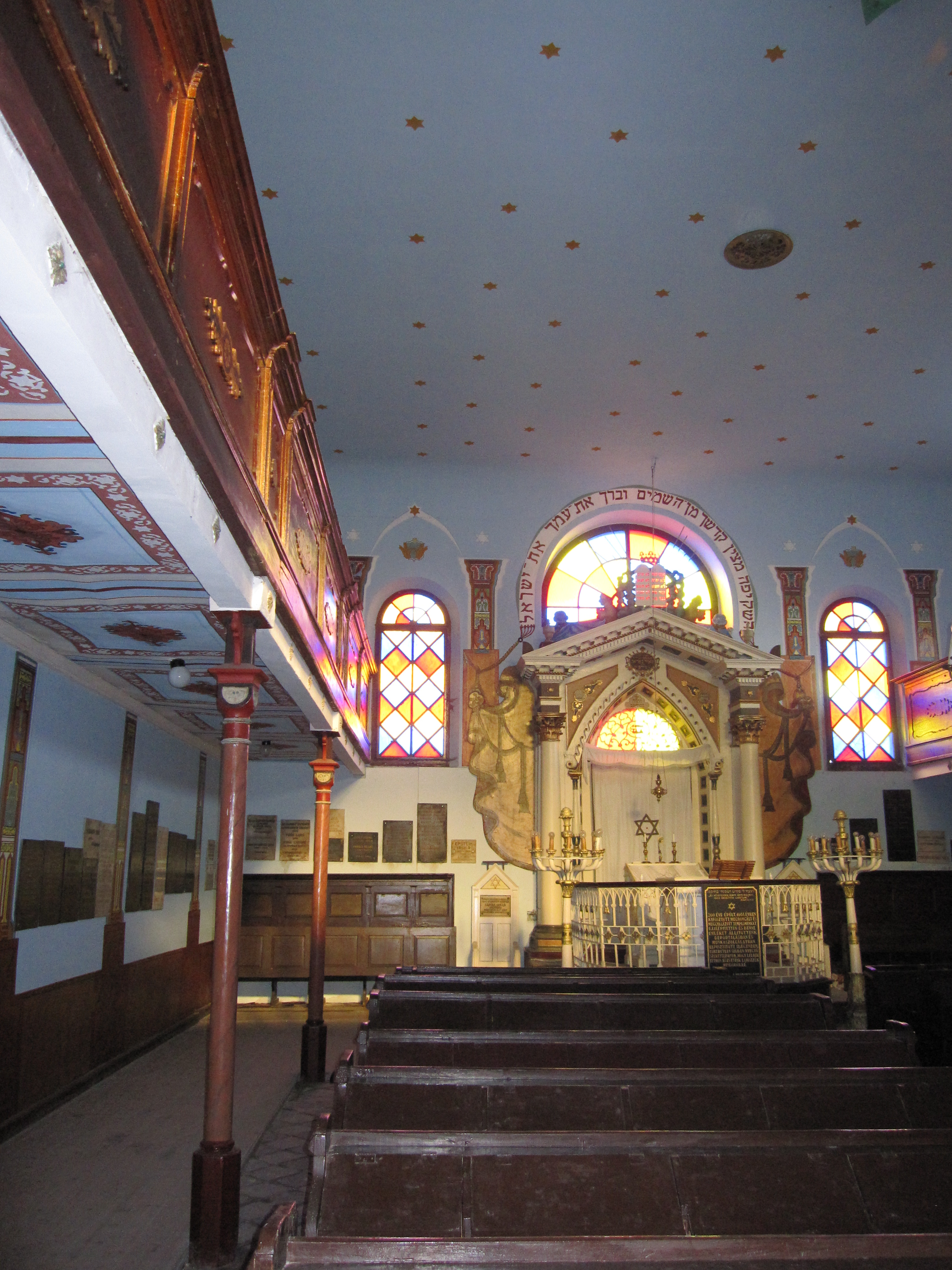
Interior of Keszthely Synagogue with memorial plaques on the wall

== See also ==
- History of the Jews in Hungary
- List of synagogues in Hungary
