= Marcali Synagogue =

Demolished synagogue in Marcali, Hungary

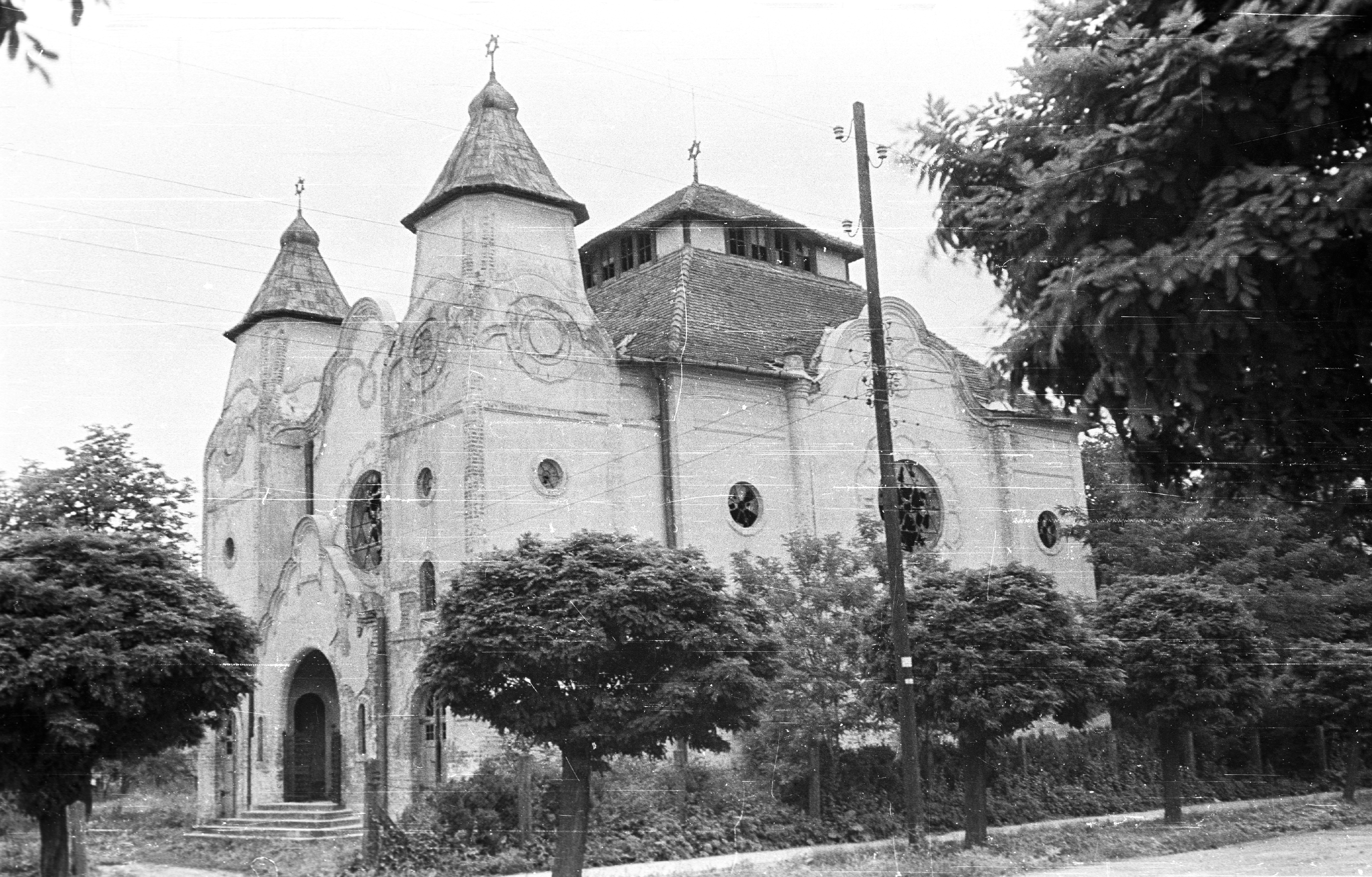
- A photograph of the former synagogue in 1959

- Location of the former synagogue in Hungary

Religion
- Affiliation: Judaism (former)
- Rite: Nusach Ashkenaz
- Ecclesiastical or organizational status: Synagogue (1909–c. 1939); Profane use (1945–1963)
- Status: Demolished

Location
- Location: Marcali, Somogy
- Country: Hungary
- Interactive map of Marcali Synagogue
- Coordinates: 46°35′06″N 17°24′39″E

Architecture
- Architects: Marcell Komor; Dezső Jakab
- Type: Synagogue architecture
- Style: Hungarian Secession; Art Nouveau
- Established: c. 1840 (as a congregation)
- Completed: 1906
- Demolished: 1963
- Dome: One

The Marcali Synagogue is a former Jewish congregation and synagogue that was located in Marcali, in the county of Somogy, Hungary. Completed in 1906, the building was used a synagogue until World War II and profane use until its demolition in 1963.

== History ==
A synagogue was built in Marcali prior to 1840. A new synagogue was inaugurated in 1906. The building was designed by Marcell Komor and Dezső Jakab, and was an attractive feature that reconciled the Hungarian Secession motifs with the Art Nouveau world. The synagogue square was centrally arranged, the exterior of which was characterized by the dome and the two towers. The building was formally related to the synagogue in Subotica.

The greatly reduced number of Jewish communities after World War II was no longer able to use the building much. It was demolished in 1963.

== See also ==
- History of the Jews in Hungary
- List of synagogues in Hungary
