= List of synagogues in Hungary =

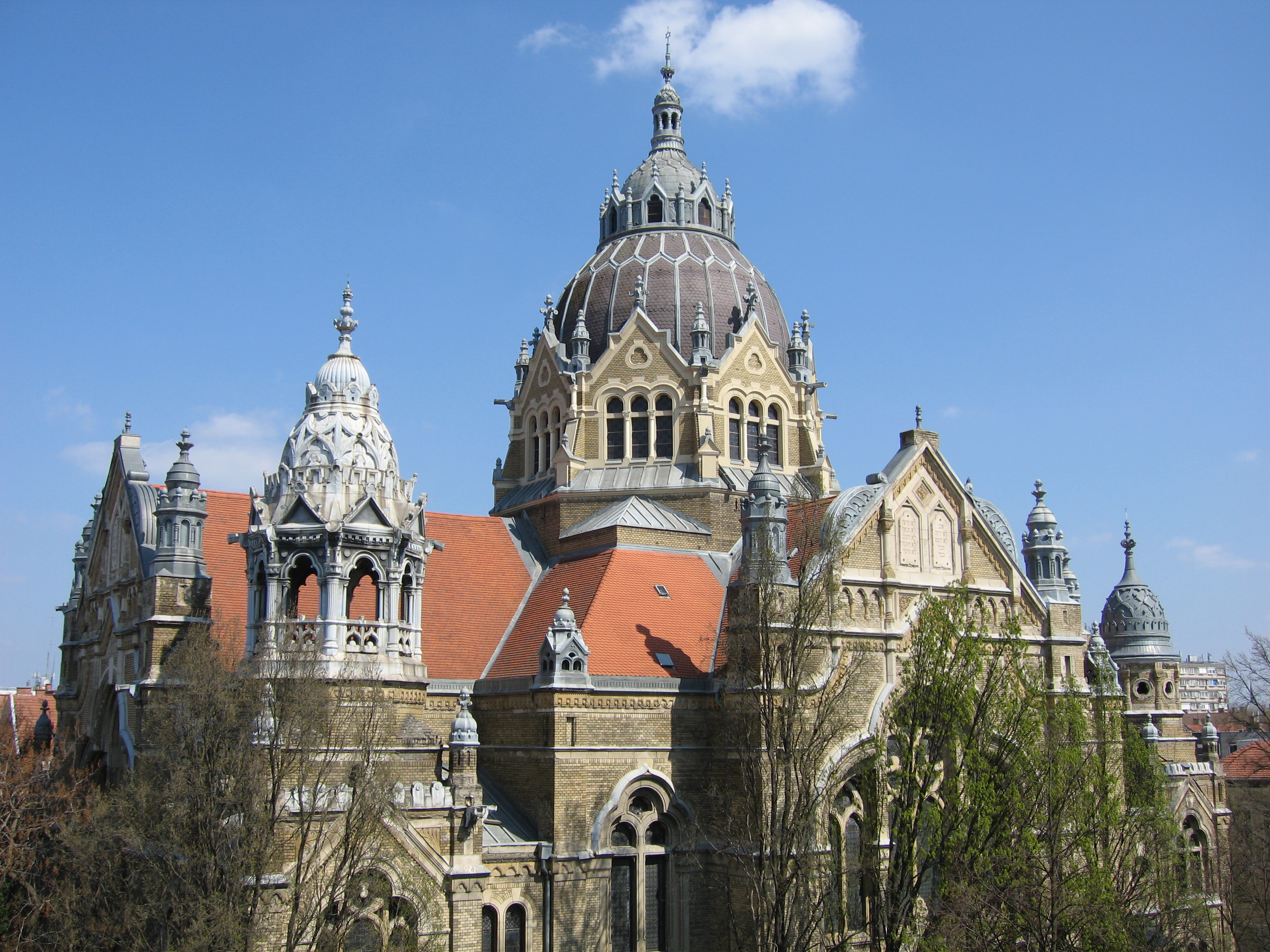
The so-called New Synagogue of Szeged monumental building in Szeged (built in 1900–1902)

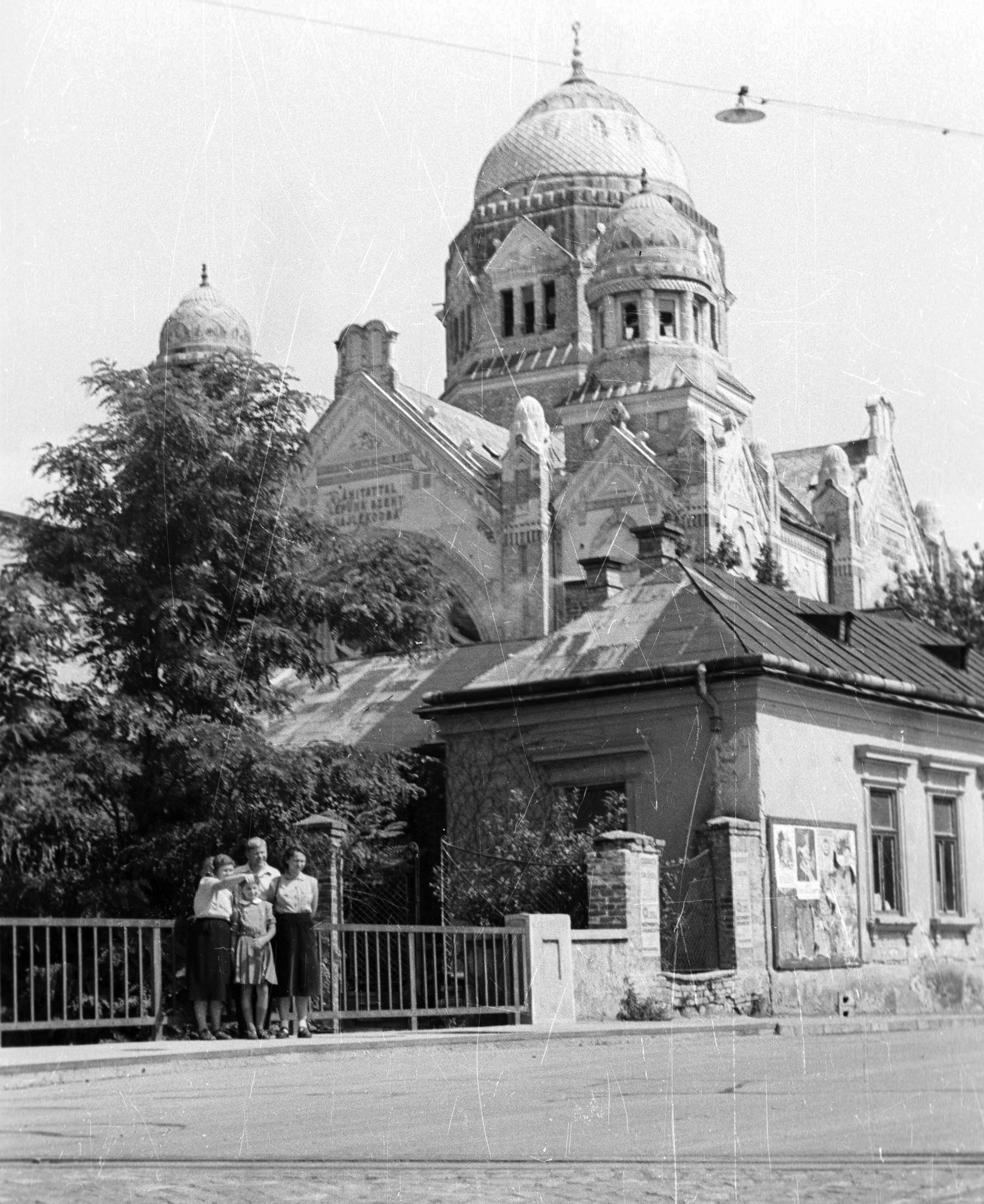
Another synagogue: the synagogue of Eger (built in 1911–1913). It was also a colossal work of its time, but it was demolished in 1967, so only a few black and white photographs testify to its existence.

This List of synagogues in Hungary contains active, otherwise used and destroyed synagogues in Hungary. This article 'contains synagogues' built in the historical Hungary area, broken down by county. Most of the synagogues listed are no longer in use or have other non-religious functions, and some have been demolished.

At the beginning of the 20th century, there were Jewish communities in many settlements of the Kingdom of Hungary, which eventually built their own church, synagogue. Most of these buildings were built with extremely sophisticated artistic exterior and interior designs. There were many Classicist style, many Romantic, many Eclectic and some Art Nouveau. It was designed to be more monumental in size to show the greatness and richness of the equalized and enriching Jewry of the turn of the century - similar to the churches of the Christian churches of the time.

However, during World War II, several synagogues were destroyed or significantly damaged. There has never been a central register of the properties of decentralized and autonomous communities, says Gusztáv Zoltai in 2010, the managing director of Mazsihisz (Association of Jewish Communities in Hungary). After World War II, much was demolished. Many buildings could not be maintained by the local Jewish community, whose membership dropped significantly due to the Holocaust and were sold to municipalities in the 1950s and 1960s. Several of the buildings sold in this way were renovated for cultural purposes - but there were some that were used as warehouses without any preservation. Some were transformed into shops and not one was demolished, as the simplistic architectural trends of the era did not favor the more ornate styles of the past. Examples are the huge Eger Synagogue, a Makó Neological Synagogue and Salgótarján synagogue. The memory of the destroyed Hungarian synagogues is now only photos and postcards. The situation is similar with other parts of the Carpathian Basin belonging to historical Hungary. (Southern Region, Croatian Territories, Highlands, Transylvania, Transcarpathia)

The list of Hungarian synagogues is not necessarily complete, as only a negligible number of sources testify to the existence of some synagogues. Edited by Péter Újvári in 1929, Budapest lists' 'Hungarian Jewish lexicon' 'lists several Hungarian settlements where a synagogue existed at the time of the book' s publication. Larger research into the still standing and already destroyed buildings began during the change of regime. In 1989 László Gerő Synagogues in Hungary, in 2005 Hedvig Podonyi Synagogues in Hungary published photo albums. Larger than all this is Rudin Klein's 2011 book Synagogues in Hungary 1782–1918, who devoted no less than 678 pages to the issue. In 2019, 162 still existing synagogues were identified in a study organized by the Hebrew University of Jerusalem, "which is roughly a quarter of the number of synagogues before World War II." If this estimate is correct, there were more than 600 synagogues in Hungary before 1939, and it seems that this number' 'does not include' 'many of the previously annexed Hungarian territories. synagogue. "During the trip, [of the participants of the research tour] managed to visit 138 of the 162 buildings listed. Roughly 10,000 photos were taken and many synagogues were fully documented, and accurate floor plans were made for several buildings, such as the synagogue in Abony, Baja, Keszthely or Kővágóörs."

== Budapest ==
There are several synagogues in the Hungarian capital. Some of them work, some are not in religious use. It has recently undergone several major renovations.

Location	Name	Built	Destroyed	Remarks	Picture
Budapest	Bethlen Square Synagogue	1876	stand	In use.	
Budapest	Dessewffy Street Synagogue	1870	stand	It stands in the courtyard of a building. In use.	
Budapest	Cinkota Synagogue				
Budapest	Dohány Street Synagogue	1854–1859	stand	It is the largest synagogue in Hungary and the largest synagogue in Europe too. In use.	
Budapest	Dózsa György Street Synagogue	1907–1909	stand	It is currently a fencing room, next to which there is a neolog community in a prayer hall.	
Budapest	Frankel Leo street Synagogue, Budapest	1887–1888	stand	In use.	
Budapest	Hegedűs Gyula Street Synagogue	1911	stand	It is located in a residential house. In use.	
Budapest	Temple of heroes	1931	stand	In use.	
Budapest	Kazinczy Street Synagogue, Budapest	1912–1913	stand	In use.	
Budapest	Kőbánya Synagogue, Budapest	1909–1912	stand	Converted into a Christian church, it operates that way.	
Budapest	Lágymányos Synagogue	1936	stand	It became the property of the Scientific Dissemination Society.	
Budapest	Lipótváros Synagogue			A monumental synagogue left in the plans.	
Budapest	Nagytétény Synagogue	before 1760	stand	It works when converted to a library.	
Budapest	Óbuda Synagogue	1820–1821	stand	Recently renovated. In use.	
Budapest	Páva Street Synagogue, Budapest	1923	stand	Recently renovated. In use.	
Budapest	Pesterzsébet Synagogue, Budapest	1901	stand	It is in an extremely dilapidated condition.	
Budapest	Rákoscsaba Synagogue				
Budapest	Rákospalota Synagogue	1926–1927	stand	Currently in the warehouse of the National Széchényi Library.	
Budapest	Rumbach Street Synagogue	1869–1872	stand	Recently renovated.	
Budapest	Sashalom Synagogue				
Budapest	Újpest Synagogue	1885–1886	stand	Recently renovated. In use.	
Budapest	Vasvári Pál Street Synagogue	1886	stand	It stands in the courtyard of a building. In use.	

== Bács–Kiskun county ==
Location	Name	Built	Destroyed	Remarks	Picture
Apostag	Apostag Synagogue	1822	stand	In 1989, it was the first synagogue to be renovated while retaining its sacred character. During the restoration, a library was converted from the building, but it is seen in its original condition as a fridge cabinet and bima (lake reading platform) and also provides space for community celebrations. The renovation work was awarded the Europa Nostra Award.	
Bácsalmás	Bácsalmás Synagogue	1888	1954	After World War II, the number of members of the community declined. The synagogue was demolished in the 1950s.	
Baja	Baja Synagogue	1842–1845	stand	The Ady Endre City Library and Cultural Center operates in it.	
Dunapataj	Dunapataj Synagogue	1879	1957	After World War II, the number of members of the community declined. The synagogue was demolished in the 1950s.	
Fajsz	Fajsz Synagogue				
Jánoshalma	Jánoshalma Synagogue	1820	stand	It is not in use.	
Kalocsa	Kalocsa Synagogue	1861	stand	It is used for cultural purposes.	
Kecel	Kecel Synagogue				
Kecskemét	Kecskemét Orthodox Synagogue	1918	stand	It houses the Hungarian Museum of Photography.	
Kecskemét	Kecskemét Neolog Synagogue	1864−1868	stand	It houses the House of Science and Technology.	
Kiskőrös	Kiskőrös Great Synagogue	1873	1946	It was demolished after World War II.	
Kiskőrös	Kiskőrös Little Synagogue	1915	stand	It functions as a music school, a concert hall.	
Kiskunfélegyháza	Kiskunfélegyháza Synagogue				
Kiskunhalas	Kiskunhalas Synagogue	1860	stand	In use.	
Soltvadkert	Soltvadkert Synagogue				
Szabadszállás	Szabadszállás Synagogue				
Tass	Tass Synagogue				
Tiszakécske	Tiszakécske Synagogue	1909	stand	It is used for cultural purposes.	

== Baranya county ==
Location	Name	Built	Destroyed	Remarks	Picture
Mohács	Mohács Synagogue	1864	1968	It has been broken down.	
Pécs	Pécs Synagogue	1868–1869	stand	Recently renovated. In use.	
Pécsvárad	Pécsvárad Synagogue				
Siklós	Siklós Synagogue				
Szigetvár	Szigetvár Synagogue	1857	stand	The Szigetvár City Library operates in it.	

== Békés county ==
Location	Name	Built	Destroyed	Remarks	Picture
Battonya	Battonya Synagogue				
Békés	Békés Synagogue	1909	stand	It is used for cultural purposes	
Békéscsaba	Békéscsaba New Synagogue	2004	stand	A new building. In use.	
Békéscsaba	Békéscsaba Orthodox Synagogue	1894	stand	It has been transformed, it has no religious function.	
Békéscsaba	Békéscsaba Neolog Synagogue	1893	stand	It has been transformed, it has no religious function.	
Füzesgyarmat	Füzesgyarmat Synagogue	1929	stand	It works as a school.	
Gyula	Gyula Synagogue	1882–1883	stand	It works as a school.	
Mezőberény	Mezőberény Synagogue	1884	after 1945 (?)	It has been broken down.	
Orosháza	Orosháza Synagogue	1890	stand	It is not in use.	
Szeghalom	Szeghalom Synagogue				

== Borsod–Abaúj–Zemplén county ==
Location	Name	Built	Destroyed	Remarks	Picture
Abaújszántó	Abaújszántó Synagogue	1896	stand	Used as a warehouse.	
Bodrogkeresztúr	Bodrogkeresztúr Synagogue	1906	stand	The Directorate of the Bükk National Park operates in it.	
Encs	Encs Synagogue				
Erdőbénye	Erdőbénye Synagogue				
Fony	Fony Synagogue				
Jósvafő	Jósvafő Synagogue	?	?		
Kazincbarcika	Kazincbarcika Synagogue				
Mád	Mád Synagogue	1795	stand	In use.	
Megyaszó	Megyaszó Synagogue	before 1913	stand	Used as a warehouse.	
Mezőcsát	Mezőcsát Synagogue	1880	stand	Recently renovated. It is used for cultural purposes.	
Mezőkövesd	Mezőkövesd Synagogue	1896	after 1945	It has been broken down.	
Miskolc	Synagogue of Miskolc (Kazinczy Street Synagogue)	1856–1863	stand	In use.	
Miskolc	Palóczy Street Synagogue	1900	1963	The building was damaged in World War II. It was later demolished, citing its damaged condition and excessive size.	
Olaszliszka	Olaszliszka Synagogue	1875	stand	Largely broken down. Remains converted into a memorial site.	
Ónod	Ónod Synagogue				
Putnok	Putnok Synagogue	1865	stand	Out of order. In a ruined and life-threatening condition.	
Sajókazinc	Sajókazinc Synagogue				
Sajószentpéter	Sajószentpéter Synagogue	1900	stand	It operates as a pension.	
Sály	Sály Synagogue				
Sárospatak	Sárospatak Synagogue	1890	stand	It operates as a department store.	
Sátoraljaújhely	Sátoraljaújhely Old Synagogue	1795	stand	Out of order.	
Sátoraljaújhely	Sátoraljaújhely New Synagogue	1830-nonsense, built 1887/1888	stand, altered beyond recognition in 1969	Out of order.	
Szendrő	Szendrő Synagogue	1830	c. 1944	It was broken down.	
Szerencs	Szerencs Synagogue	before 1909	mid 1970s	It was broken down.	
Szikszó	Szikszó Synagogue	1914	stand	It acts as an incubator house.	
Tállya	Tállya Synagogue				
Tarcal	Tarcal Synagogue	1779 (or 1795)	stand	Used as guesthouse.	
Tokaj	Tokaj Synagogue	1899	stand	It is used for cultural purposes.	
Tolcsva	Tolcsva Synagogue	?	?	It has been broken down.	
Vilmány	Vilmány Synagogue				
Vizsoly	Vizsoly Synagogue				

== Csongrád county ==
Location	Name	Built	Destroyed	Remarks	Picture
Csanádpalota	Csanádpalota Synagogue				
Hódmezővásárhely	Hódmezővásárhely Synagogue	1857	stand	It was remodeled in 1908. Recently renovated. It is used for cultural purposes.	
Makó	Makó Orthodox Synagogue	1895	stand	Recently renovated. It is used for cultural purposes.	
Makó	Makó Neological Synagogue	1914	1965	After the destruction of Makó Jewry in World War II, the synagogue lost its former role. In the 1950s and 1960s, several ideas were born for recycling, but they were eventually dismantled.	
Szeged	Szeged Old Synagogue	1843	stand	It is used for cultural purposes.	
Szeged	Szeged Synagogue	1900–1902	stand	It is the second largest synagogue in Hungary and the fourth largest in the world. Recently renovated. In use.	
Szentes	Szentes Synagogue	1868–1872	stand	The Szentes City Library operates in the building.	

== Fejér county ==
Location	Name	Built	Destroyed	Remarks	Picture
Bicske	Bicske Synagogue				
Cece	Cece Synagogue			At the time of its rise in 1955, the building was already in its original function: it was piled full of fruit crates.	
Dunaújváros (before 1951: Dunapentele)	Dunaújváros Synagogue				
Enying	Enying Synagogue				
Lovasberény	Lovasberény Synagogue	before 1798	after 1945	It has been broken down.	
Martonvásár	Martonvásár Synagogue				
Sárbogárd	Sárbogárd Synagogue				
Székesfehérvár	Székesfehérvár Orthodox Synagogue	1862	1946	The building was bombed during World War II and was significantly damaged. Its ruins were demolished in 1946.	
Székesfehérvár	Székesfehérvár Neolog Synagogue	1870	after 1945	It has been broken down.	

== Győr–Moson–Sopron county ==
Location	Name	Built	Destroyed	Remarks	Picture
Győr	Győr Synagogue	1870	stand	Recently renovated. It is used for cultural purposes.	
Mosonmagyaróvár	Mosonmagyaróvár Synagogue				
Pannonhalma	Pannonhalma Synagogue	1870s	stand	Recently renovated. It is used for cultural purposes.	
Rajka	Rajka Synagogue				
Sopron	Sopron Old Synagogue	14th century	stand	It is used for cultural purposes.	
Sopron	Sopron New Synagogue	1874	after 1945	The synagogue building was bombed in 1945, so its remains were later demolished.	
Sopron	Sopron Orthodox Synagogue	1891	stand	The building is ruined and life threatening. Renovation is planned.	
Szilsárkány	Szilsárkány Synagogue	?	?		

== Hajdú–Bihar county ==
Location	Name	Built	Destroyed	Remarks	Picture
Berettyóújfalu	Berettyóújfalu Synagogue	1903	stand	The building is ruined and life threatening. Renovation is planned.	
Debrecen	Debrecen Orthodox Synagogue	1893	stand	Recently renovated. It is used for cultural purposes.	
Debrecen	Debrecen Neological Synagogue	1896	1949	It was injured in World War II. They started renovating, but it caught fire and burned out. Its remains were then demolished.	
Debrecen	Debrecen Kápolnás Street Synagogue	1909–1910	stand	It was renovated in 2015.	
Derecske	Derecske Synagogue				
Egyek	Egyek Synagogue				
Földes	Földes Synagogue				
Hajdúböszörmény	Hajdúböszörmény Synagogue	1863	stand	It is under renovation.	
Hajdúdorog	Hajdúdorog Synagogue	before 1859	after 1945 (?)	Destroyed.	
Hajdúnánás	Hajdúnánás Synagogue				
Hajdúszoboszló	Hajdúszoboszló Synagogue	1895			
Kaba	Kaba Synagogue				
Konyár	Konyár Synagogue	c. 1900	stand	?	

== Heves county ==
Location	Name	Built	Destroyed	Remarks	Picture
Eger	Eger Synagogue	1911–1913	1967	It was blown up, citing its exaggerated and degrading size of the settlement.	
Eger	Eger Orthodox Synagogue	1893	stand	It was converted into a store.	
Eger	Eger Little Synagogue	1820	stand	It is used for cultural purposes.	
Füzesabony	Füzesabony Synagogue				
Gyöngyös	Gyöngyös Synagogue	1930	stand	Recently renovated. It is used for cultural purposes.	
Gyöngyös	Gyöngyös Old Synagogue	1872	1917	It burned out, so it was demolished.	
Hatvan	Hatvan Synagogue	1876	after 1955	No information was found about it, probably demolished.	
Heves	Heves Synagogue	?	after 1945	The building was demolished.	
Recsk	Recsk Synagogue				
Verpelét	Verpelét Synagogue	1870	stand	Today, in the former synagogue, the town operates a fire station.	

== Jász–Nagykun–Szolnok county ==
Location	Name	Built	Destroyed	Remarks	Picture
Karcag	Karcag Synagogue	1899	stand	Recently renovated. In use.	
Jászberény	Jászberény Synagogue	1887	after 1945	The building was demolished.	
Jászárokszállás	Jászárokszállás Synagogue	19th century (?)	after 1945	The building was demolished.	
Jászfényszaru	Jászfényszaru Synagogue	19th century (?)	after 1945	The building was demolished.	
Kisújszállás	Kisújszállás Synagogue				
Kunmadaras	Kunmadaras Synagogue	1880	1941	The building collapsed.	
Kunhegyes	Kunhegyes Synagogue	1893	stand	It is not in use. The building is ruined and life threatening.	
Kunszentmárton	Kunszentmárton Synagogue	1911–1912	stand	Recently renovated. It is used for cultural purposes.	
Mezőtúr	Mezőtúr Synagogue	1830	stand	It houses the local City Gallery.	
Szolnok	Szolnok Synagogue	1898	stand	Recently renovated. The Szolnok Gallery operates in the building.	
Tiszabő	Tiszabő Synagogue				
Tiszafüred	Tiszafüred Synagogue	1912	stand	Converted to be used as a store.	
Törökszentmiklós	Törökszentmiklós Synagogue				

== Komárom–Esztergom county ==
Location	Name	Built	Destroyed	Remarks	Picture
Ács	Ács Synagogue				
Bana	Bana Synagogue	?	stand	It functions as a residential house.	
Esztergom	Esztergom Synagogue	1888	stand	It is used for cultural purposes.	
Kisbér	Kisbér Synagogue				
Tata	Tata Synagogue	1861	stand	It acts as an exhibition place for local Greco-Roman sculptures.	

== Nógrád county ==
Location	Name	Built	Destroyed	Remarks	Picture
Balassagyarmat	Balassagyarmat Synagogue	1866	1950	It was used as a munitions depot in World War II and was then blown up by retreating German troops in December 1944. The ruined remains of the building were blown up and cleaned up in 1950.	
Salgótarján	Salgótarján Neolog Synagogue	1901–1902	1969	Although declared a monument by the Hungarian state, it was demolished in 1969.	
Salgótarján	Salgótarján Orthodox Synagogue	early 20th century (?)	1964 (?)	It has been broken down.	
Szécsény	Szécsény Synagogue	?	after 1945	It has been broken down.	

== Pest county ==
Location	Name	Built	Destroyed	Remarks	Picture
Abony	Abony Synagogue	1825	stand	Used as a warehouse.	
Albertirsa	Albertirsa Synagogue	early 1800s	stand	It is used for cultural purposes.	
Aszód	Aszód Synagogue	1908	1950	The building was demolished.	
Cegléd	Cegléd Synagogue	1905	stand	It functions as a sports hall.	
Göd	Göd Synagogue				
Gödöllő	Gödöllő Synagogue	1894	after 1945	The building was demolished.	
Gyömrő	Gyömrő Synagogue				
Isaszeg	Isaszeg Synagogue				
Maglód	Maglód Synagogue				
Monor	Monor Synagogue				
Nagykáta	Nagykáta Synagogue	1905	stand	After World War II, the number of members of the community declined. The building was sold to the village in 1952. It has been used for worldly functions for decades. It's been empty for a long time.	
Nagykőrös	Nagykőrös Synagogue	1923	stand	The example of Nagykőrös shows the possibility of the fate of the synagogues. György Feldmájer, the then leader of the Nagykőrös community - the father of Péter Feldmájer, the later president of Mazsihisz - refused to sell the synagogue either on request or under threat. In return, central support was withdrawn, and maintenance costs were borne by the family and the local community for decades from their own coffers. In use.	
Ócsa	Ócsa Synagogue			The building of the synagogue in Ócsa did not remain, but the covenant was dismantled and sent to the Hungarian Jewish Museum, where it was hoped for its gracious preservation. In the museum, the fridge cabinet was assembled and, according to an album made in 1949, was incorporated into the exhibition. His cubicle was covered with a Polish parokhet (torah curtain) from the collection of Béla Lajta, and a Hanukkah menorah from a Polish synagogue was placed in front of him. On both sides it was surrounded by former candlesticks of the Arad community. Unfortunately, the locker is no longer in the museum's collection (2010).	
Pécel	Pécel Synagogue	early 1800s (?)	stand	Out of order.	
Pilisvörösvár	Pilisvörösvár Synagogue				
Tápióbicske	Tápióbicske Synagogue				
Tápiógyörgye	Tápiógyörgye Synagogue	1896	demolished	The synagogue was built by the Tafler-Györgyey family. Neológ synagogue had been located in Pest-Pilis-Solt-Kiskun county, Hungary. 17 Jews had lived in the town in 1785. From 1910 that number increased to 110. In 1941, there were 30 Jews and 12 Christians of Jewish descent. The congregation had 27 members in 1944. The synagogue went through tough times in the second World War, but it survived the war. With the advent of communism, it became a warehouse. After its use the building became dangerous for usage and was demolished.	
Tinnye	Tinnye Synagogue	19th century (?)	stand	Used as a warehouse.	
Vác	Vác Synagogue (Vác Neolog Synagogue)	1864	stand	In use.	
Vác	Vác Orthodox Synagogue	after 1871	demolished	A ten-storey tower block was built in its place.	
Zsámbék	Zsámbék Synagogue	1790	after 1945	The historical value of the Jewish community of the same age as Óbuda was already known, in 1943 some of the surviving historical documents had already been collected by the employees of the Hungarian Jewish Museum. In 1947, the Jewish central leadership was brought to the attention of the synagogue's endangered values, but despite their warning, the synagogue was demolished not long after.	

== Somogy county ==
Location	Name	Built	Destroyed	Remarks	Picture
Ádánd	Ádánd Synagogue		before 1955	At the time of a 1955 erection, the building was no longer standing.	
Balatonboglár	Balatonboglár Synagogue	19th century (?)	stand	It operates as the Somogy County Labor Center.	
Barcs	Barcs Synagogue	1899	stand	It was converted into a furniture store.	
Igal	Igal Synagogue	?	stand	Out of order.	
Kaposvár	Kaposvár Synagogue	1864	after 1945	The building was damaged in World War II and was therefore demolished on the grounds of town planning.	
Kéthely	Kéthely Synagogue				
Marcali	Marcali Synagogue	1906	1963	The greatly reduced number of Jewish communities after World War II was no longer able to use the building much, so it was later demolished.	
Nagyatád	Nagyatád Synagogue				
Nemesdéd	Nemesdéd Synagogue				
Pusztakovácsi	Pusztakovácsi Synagogue				
Siófok	Siófok Old Synagogue	1869	after 1945	The synagogue was dismantled after World War II.	
Siófok	Siófok New Synagogue	1985	stand	In use.	
Somogyszil	Somogyszil Synagogue		before 1955	At the time of a 1955 erection, the building was no longer standing.	
Tab	Tab Synagogue	1897	before 1955	At the time of a 1955 erection, the building was no longer standing.	
Toponár	Toponár Synagogue	1652?	after 1945	The building was demolished.	

== Szabolcs–Szatmár–Bereg county ==
Location	Name	Built	Destroyed	Remarks	Picture
Beregdaróc	Beregdaróc Synagogue	?	stand	It was actually just a prayer room. It has been converted into a business.	
Beregsurány	Beregsurány Synagogue	early 1900	stand	Smaller house of prayer, converted into a residential building.	
Csenger	Csenger Synagogue				
Gergelyiugornya (now Vásárosnamény)	Gergelyiugornya Synagogue	1908	stand	Smaller house of prayer. It is not in use.	
Hodász	Hodász Synagogue				
Kisvárda	Kisvárda Synagogue	1901	stand	It is used for cultural purposes.	
Mándok	Mándok Synagogue	19th century (?)	after 1945	The building was demolished.	
Mátészalka	Mátészalka Synagogue	1857	stand	It is not in use.	
Nagykálló	Nagykálló Synagogue	c. 1790	after 1945	The building was destroyed.	
Nyíracsád	Nyíracsád Synagogue	1860	stand	It is used as a Baptist house of prayer.	
Nyírbátor	Nyírbátor Synagogue				
Nyíregyháza	Nyíregyháza Old Synagogue	1880	after 1945	It burned down during World War II and the building was later demolished.	
Nyíregyháza	Nyíregyháza New Synagogue	1924–1932	stand	In use.	
Ópályi	Ópályi Synagogue				
Tiszaeszlár	Tiszaeszlár Synagogue				
Tornyospálca	Tornyospálca Synagogue				

== Tolna county ==
Location	Name	Built	Destroyed	Remarks	Picture
Bátaszék	Bátaszék Synagogue	1862	1949	At the time of a 1955 erection, the building was no longer standing.	
Bonyhád	Bonyhád Old Synagogue	1795	stand	The building is in ruined condition.	
Bonyhád	Bonyhád New Synagogue	1924	stand	It is not in use.	
Bölcske	Bölcske Synagogue			At the time of its rise in 1955, the building was already used in its original function: a grain warehouse was built inside.	
Dombóvár	Dombóvár Synagogue	1885	stand	By 2023 the building is in ruined condition.	
Dunaföldvár	Dunaföldvár Synagogue	1854	after 1945	The building was destroyed.	
Fadd	Fadd Synagogue	end of the 19th century (?)	after 1945	The building was destroyed.	
Gyönk	Gyönk Synagogue	1836	before 1955	At the time of a 1955 erection, the building was no longer standing. The new owner built a house for himself from the material of the demolished synagogue, in its place.	
Hőgyész	Hőgyész Synagogue	1861	stand	Used as a warehouse.	
Iregszemcse	Iregszemcse Synagogue	19th century (?)	after 1945	The building was destroyed.	
Miszla	Miszla Synagogue	19th century (?)	after 1945	The building was destroyed.	
Nagydorog	Nagydorog Synagogue	19th century (?)	after 1945	The building was destroyed.	
Ozora	Ozora Synagogue	end of the 19th century		The building was destroyed.	
Paks	Paks Synagogue	1785	stand	It is used for cultural purposes.	
Pincehely	Pincehely Synagogue	end of the 19th century	c. 1944	The synagogue was probably blown up by the Arrow Cross. The new owner built a house for himself from the material of the demolished synagogue, in its place.	
Simontornya	Simontornya Synagogue	1851	stand	Existing building. It's actually just a house of prayer.	
Szakcs	Szakcs Synagogue	19th century (?)	after 1945	The building was destroyed.	
Szekszárd	Szekszárd Synagogue	1897	stand	Even in the days of socialism, an exhibition hall was set up. It is used for cultural purposes.	
Tamási	Tamási Synagogue	end of the 19th century	1950s	The building was demolished.	
Tolna	Tolna Synagogue	early 20th century	1950s	The building was demolished.	

== Vas county ==
Location	Name	Built	Destroyed	Remarks	Picture
Celldömölk	Celldömölk Neolog Synagogue	1882	before 1955	At the time of a 1955 erection, the building was no longer standing.	,
Celldömölk	Celldömölk Orthodox Synagogue	1911	before 1955	At the time of a 1955 erection, the building was no longer standing.	
Jánosháza	Jánosháza Synagogue				
Körmend	Körmend Synagogue				
Kőszeg	Kőszeg Synagogue	1858–1859	stand	It is not in use.	
Sárvár	Sárvár Synagogue				
Szombathely	Szombathely Synagogue	1880	stand	It is used for cultural purposes.	
Szombathely	Szombathely Orthodox Synagogue	1832	stand	There are shops in it.	

== Veszprém county ==
Location	Name	Built	Destroyed	Remarks	Picture
Balatonfüred	Balatonfüred Synagogue				
Csabrendek	Csabrendek Synagogue				
Devecser	Devecser Synagogue			At the time of a 1955 erection, the building was already used in its original function: a flour warehouse was built inside.	
Kővágóörs	Kővágóörs Synagogue	1820s	stand	It is not in use. The building is ruined and life threatening.	
Nagyvázsony	Nagyvázsony Synagogue		after 1955	At the time of the 1955 eruption, demolition work was already in an advanced state.	
Pápa	Pápa Synagogue	1844–1846	stand	It is not in use. The inside of the building is ruined and life threatening. Occasional exhibitions are sometimes held in it.	
Sümeg	Sümeg Synagogue	1886	stand	It is used for school purposes.	
Szentgál	Szentgál Synagogue				
Tapolca	Tapolca Synagogue	1863	stand	It is used for cultural purposes.	
Várpalota	Várpápalota Synagogue	1839	stand	It is used for cultural purposes.	
Veszprém	Veszprém Synagogue	1862–1865	stand	It was rebuilt, the headquarters of the Veszprém Mining Headquarters.	

== Zala county ==
Location	Name	Built	Destroyed	Remarks	Picture
Hévíz	Hévíz Synagogue	1933	1977	It was demolished. A Holocaust memorial stands in its place.	
Keszthely	Keszthely Synagogue	1852	stand	In use.	
Nagykanizsa	Nagykanizsa Synagogue	1807–1821	stand	It needs total refurbishment.	
Pacsa	Pacsa Synagogue				
Zalaegerszeg	Zalaegerszeg Synagogue	1903	stand	It is used for cultural purposes.	
Zalaszentgrót	Zalaszentgrót Synagogue		before 1955	At the time of a 1955 erection, the building was no longer standing.	

== Sources ==
- (szerk.) Gerő László: Magyarországi zsinagógák, Műszaki Könyvkiadó, Budapest, 1989, ISBN 963-10-8231-8
- Szegő György – Szegő Dóra: Zsinagógák, Budapest Főváros Önkormányzata Főpolgármesteri Hivatala, Budapest, 2004, ISBN 963-9170-83-6
- Podonyi Hedvig: Zsinagógák Magyarországon, Viva Média Holding, Budapest, 2005, ISBN 963-761-972-0
- Klein Rudolf: Zsinagógák Magyarországon 1782–1918, TERC Kft., Budapest, 2011, ISBN 9789639968011
- P. Brestyánszky Ilona: Budapest zsinagógái, Ciceró Könyvkiadó, Budapest, 1999, ISBN 963-539-251-6
- Zsidó emlékek Tolna megyében
- Pusztay Sándor: Zsinagógák Szlovákiában – Zsinagógák, zsidó temetők, emlékhelyek, Kornétás Kiadó, 2018, ISBN 9786155058929
- Gazda Anikó: Zsinagógák és zsidó községek Magyarországon. Térképek, rajzok, adatok, MTA Judaisztikai Kutatócsoport, Budapest, 1991, ISBN 963-7450-11-4 online
- Report on the Expeditions to Hungary and the complete list of extant synagogue buildings in Hungary by the Center for Jewish Art at the Hebrew University of Jerusalem

== Old postcards ==
- http://magyarzsido.hu/index.php?option=com_catalogue&view=items&type_id=3&subtype_id=-1&Itemid=20
- http://judaica.cz/?page_id=2747
- http://judaica.cz/?page_id=8260
- http://judaica.cz/?page_id=8263
- http://judaica.cz/?page_id=8266
- http://judaica.cz/?page_id=8269
- http://judaica.cz/?page_id=2750
- https://hu.pinterest.com/andy1945/zsido-imah%C3%A1z/
