= Neolog Judaism =

Jewish denomination from Hungary

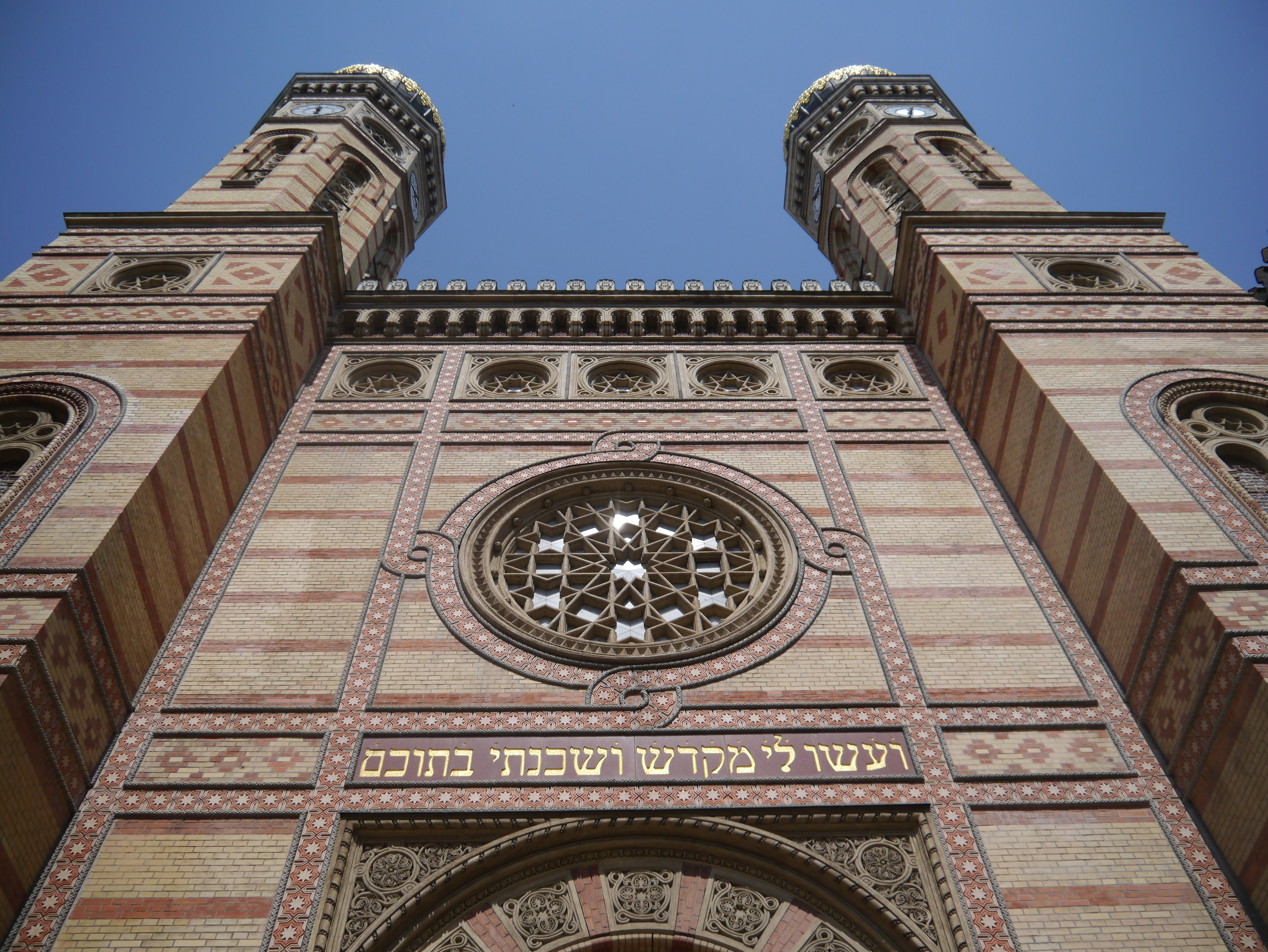
The Neolog Dohány Street Synagogue in Budapest, the largest synagogue in Europe.

Neologs (Hungarian: neológ irányzat, "Neolog faction") are one of the two large communal organizations among Hungarian Jewry. Socially, the liberal and modernist Neologs had been more inclined toward integration into Hungarian society since the Era of Emancipation in the 19th century. This was their main feature, and they were largely the representative body of urban, assimilated middle- and upper-class Jews. Religiously, the Neolog rabbinate was influenced primarily by Zecharias Frankel's Positive-Historical School, from which Conservative Judaism evolved as well, although the formal rabbinical leadership had little sway over the largely assimilationist communal establishment and congregants. Their rift with the traditionalist and conservative Orthodox Jews was institutionalized following the 1868–1869 Hungarian Jewish Congress, and they became a separate communal organization. The Neologs remained organizationally independent in those territories ceded under the terms of the 1920 Treaty of Trianon, and are still the largest group among Hungary's Jews.

== Background ==
In the early 19th century, when the first attempts to reform Judaism under the influence of Enlightenment (Haskalah) were made, they had little impact in the Kingdom of Hungary. Rabbi Aaron Chorin of Arad was an early proponent of religious modification; from the publication of his 1803 book "Emeq ha-Shave" and onwards, he dismissed Practical Kabbalah and the Zohar, authored guidelines for modernizing Judaism according to Talmudic principles and sought to remove what he regarded as superstitious or primitive elements, like spitting in the prayer of Aleinu. In 1818, Chorin was one of the few rabbis who backed the Hamburg Temple. He drew the ire of Hungarian Orthodoxy headed by Rabbi Moses Sofer of Pressburg, and had but meager following in his country. The rural character and social seclusion of the Jews in the kingdom offered little incentive for his endeavor.

With the commencement of the Hungarian Reform Era in 1825, especially after virtually all limitations on Jewish settlement were removed in 1840, the Kingdom's Jews underwent rapid urbanization and acculturation, and many began to assimilate. A gradual linguistic shift from Yiddish to German took place, and later to Hungarian. The pressures that motivated German Jews to seek aesthetic changes in their synagogues a generation earlier began to manifest themselves. In addition, the local Liberals – Lajos Kossuth among them – insisted that Emancipation would be granted only after Jews abandoned the customs that set them apart from society so that they could fully integrate. As in Germany, both moderate and extreme religious reformers in Hungary opposed this demand, claiming civil rights should be unconditional and that the changes they instituted were made for their own sake. However, there was a clear correlation between the levels of education and acculturation and support for change. At that time, the assimilated Jews had long since ceased to uphold traditional religious rules such as Sabbath observance and the requirement for Jewish-cooked food.

== Coalescence ==
=== Influences ===
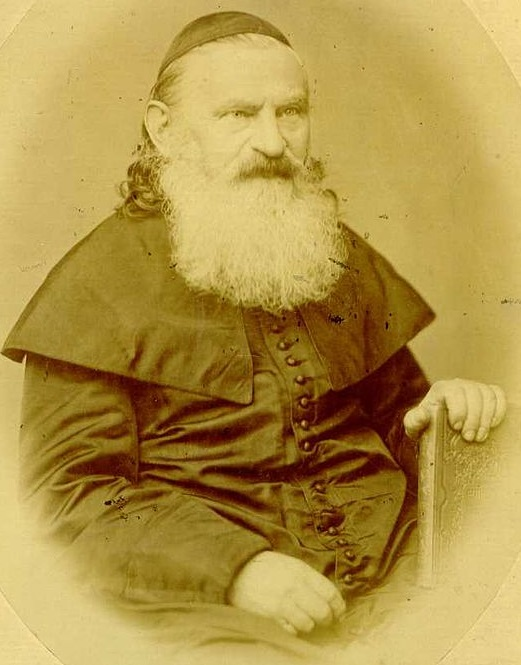
Rabbi Leopold Löw.

In 1827, a young lay leader of the Pesth Jewish community, Gabriel Ullmann, established a prayer quorum that practiced the rite of the Stadttempel in Vienna. This style was carefully crafted by Isaac Noah Mannheimer to introduce aesthetic change without breaching the Shulchan Aruch; the bimah was set in the front of the hall, as in churches, and the wedding canopy was held inside rather than under the sky. An all-male choir accompanied prayers, and the rabbi delivered his sermon in the vernacular, dressed in a cassock. In 1830, the Pesth quorum turned to a fully functional synagogue, and from there the new rite spread to other large cities. The Viennese Rite, wrote Michael Silber, was the key factor in what would be known as "Neology" in Hungary – the designation itself was late, and was first used by the local Orthodox by the end of the 1860s, during the Congress controversy. They borrowed it from Rabbi Samson Raphael Hirsch in Frankfurt, who applied it to denote all religious reformers. The term "Neologs" remained in common use only in Hungary, and became identified with that movement.

As opposed to the German states, the weight of intellectual rabbis in Hungary was low; the communities' dignitaries were those who led the acceptance of the new ritual, and they were content with what German progressive Jews condemned as "cosmetic changes". The Neologs had theologians who applied critical analysis to the study of Judaism and sought to modify it on the basis of scientific research. Of those, the most prominent was Rabbi Leopold Löw, who was also instrumental in promoting the cause of Emancipation and in the adoption of Hungarian language and national identification among the Jews; he was the first to preach in that language, doing so from 1844. But even he shared the views of Zecharias Frankel, whom he considered his mentor along with Solomon Judah Loeb Rapoport.

The ideas of Abraham Geiger and the other German pioneers of Reform Judaism found barely any support in Hungary. In 1845, the Ksav Sofer could still recommend that Jacob Ettlinger approach Löw Schawbb – Rabbi of the largest Neolog center, Pesth, and Leopold's father-in-law – and request to add his signature to a petition against the conferences assembled by Geiger and his colleagues. Leopold Löw supported Frankel's failed attempt to convene a counter-conference in Dresden.

Graduates of the Jewish Theological Seminary of Breslau, hub of Frankel's Positive-Historical School, were sought after by the liberal congregations in Hungary for the rabbi's office. The Neologs' main efforts were directed at establishing an institution along similar lines in their country. One such graduate, Alexander Kohut, became a Neolog activist and rabbi; afterwards, he immigrated overseas and co-founded the Jewish Theological Seminary of America. Later on, a considerable number of the rabbis affiliated with the United Synagogue of Conservative Judaism in its early days arrived from Hungary and were linked with Neology.

=== Religious strife ===
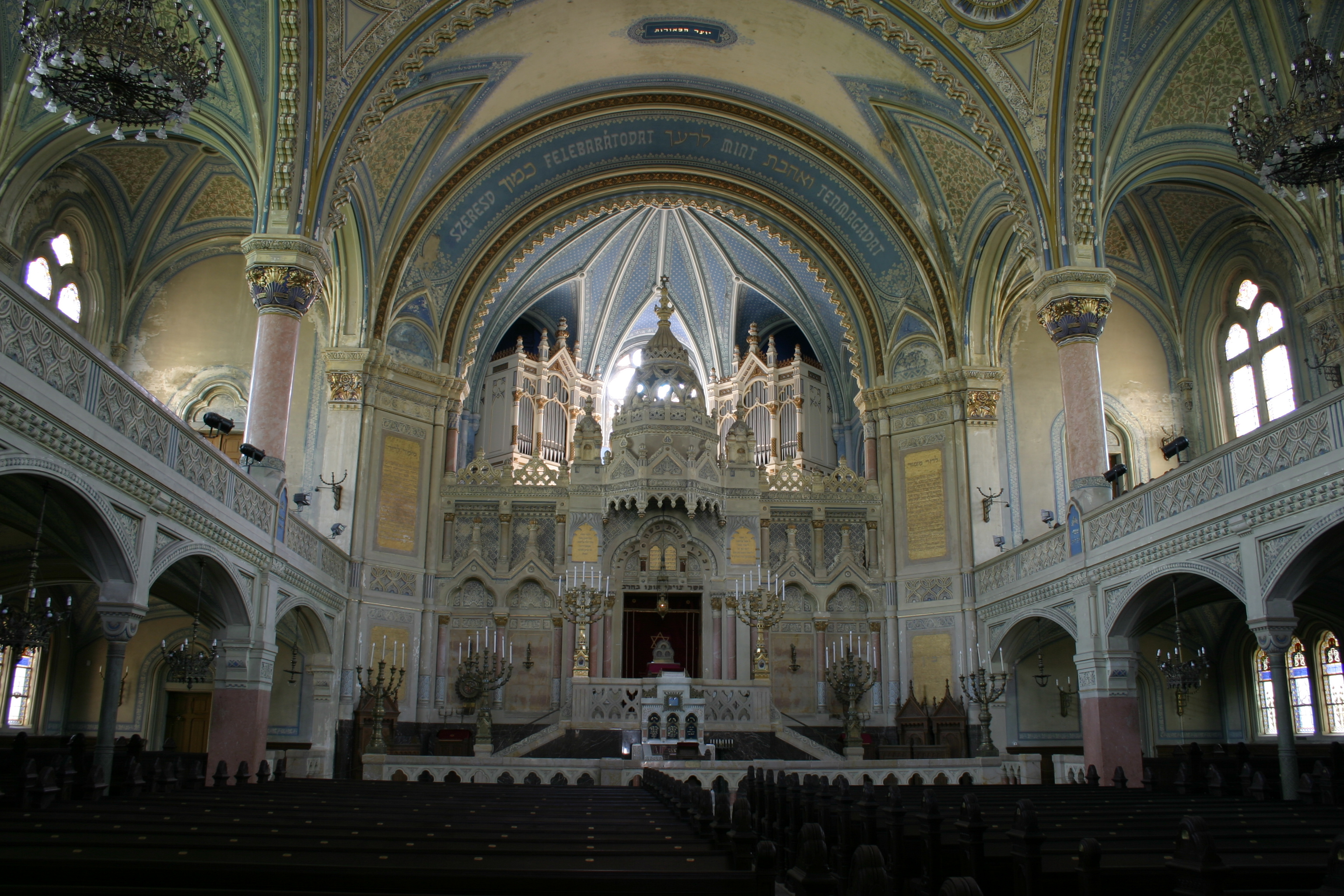
The hall of the Szeged Synagogue.

During the 1848 Revolution, Ede Horn, a disciple of the radical German rabbi Samuel Holdheim, headed the Pesth Reform Association, where he abolished circumcision and moved the Sabbath to Sunday. Löw and Schwabb condemned him sharply, and demanded the authorities close down the Association – now headed by David Einhorn, who arrived to replace Horn after the latter fled the country – and similar groups that sprung up at the time of the revolution.

In 1851, the victorious Austrians requested Jewish leaders to propose means to govern itself. The authorities did not favor Horn's extreme measures, but were not keen on the Orthodox either. Eventually, a committee chaired by Löw drafted a general constitution, which mandated the forming of a seminary as the only certified institute for training rabbis, sought to apply the aesthetic modifications practiced in Pesth across the country and aimed at creating schools for public education at the communities. The committee defined the Association as "a cult, similar to Hasidism", and had the government disperse it.

Jacob Katz viewed the constitution as an important testimony to the "emerging Neolog tendency": while it opposed any changes in the laws of religion pertaining to Sabbath and the holidays, marriage and divorce, dietary regulations etc., it also refused to apply any coercion to enforce them, whether by legal or social means.

Rabbi Meir Eisenstaedter, representing the Orthodox, opposed public education and wished that Jewish children continue to be privately tutored in cheders. He also requested that the government insure that only conservative rabbis be appointed, and that they will be granted jurisdiction to deal with "heretical elements".

The Austrians closed the Association but refrained from enforcing the constitution, which was severely opposed by the Orthodox. A network of German-language schools was set in many communities, and it switched to Hungarian in 1860, greatly increasing the acculturation of the Jews. By the time of the official schism in 1868–1871, most of the young were already graduates of these.

In the cultural sphere, the Neolog elements tended to embrace Magyarization, while the Orthodox Oberlander Jews in the northwest of the Kingdom were more inclined toward the German culture. The Unterlander Jews in the northeast, even more conservative and barely acculturated, remained Yiddish-speaking. However, after the 1867 Austro-Hungarian Compromise, the Orthodox leadership was quick in declaring its support of Magyar nationalism; by the turn of the century, most Hungarian Jews, regardless of affiliation, viewed themselves as "Magyars of Israelite faith".

In 1851, a new challenge appeared before Löw and his circle. The Modern Orthodox founder Azriel Hildesheimer arrived from Prussia to serve as rabbi of Eisenstadt, bringing with him the philosophy of Torah im Derech Eretz. While the Neologs did not perceive the "Old Orthodoxy" of Moses Sofer's disciples as a potent competitor for the loyalty of the educated Jews, Hildesheimer signaled a different approach. Neolog publications, especially Löw's Ben Chananja, launched constant tirades against the "Pest of Neo-Orthodoxy", castigating the Eisenstadt rabbi for merely presenting a shallow facade of modernity. His school, which introduced secular studies, was condemned as a "Polish yeshiva under a different name".

The Neologs and Hildesheimer often came to public dispute, with the most important taking place in 1863, after Heinrich Graetz was sued for dismissing the traditional concept of a personal Messiah. The affair occurred at a time in which the rift between the modern Orthodox in Germany and Zecharia Frankel's Positive-Historical School was widening. While many still regarded him as an ally, his 1859 treatise Darche ha-Mischna ("Ways of the Mishnah") was severely condemned by Samson Raphael Hirsch.

Hildesheimer, who was bothered that public opinion did not perceive a difference between both groups in regards to observance, used the Graetz controversy to prove the existence of a dogmatic chasm. He had hundreds of rabbis sign a petition against the historian, denouncing him for violating one of Maimonides' 13 principles of faith, a belief in the Messiah, and for doubting the integrity of Scripture. The Neologs, on the other hand, rallied behind Graetz, stating the incident proved that Hildesheimer was rejecting modern Biblical research. By the 1860s, constant conflict between conservative and liberal elements was prevalent in many communities.

== Schism ==
In 1867, full emancipation was granted to the Jews in the newly autonomous Hungary. However, no separation of Church and State took place, and all Hungarians were mandated to belong to religious bodies that collected their own taxes and retained control over aspects of civilian lives, like birth registrations and marriage. The Pesth community board suggested forming a united representative organization for all Jews. The Orthodox viewed this proposal with great suspicion, believing it to be a Neolog conspiracy; the term itself entered Orthodox discourse at that time. Eventually, the traditionalists seceded from the founding Congress of the new organ and formed a separate one, which was formally recognized in 1871. Most liberal communities, which were prone to elect like-minded rabbis, joined the first. The majority of the religiously conservative ones affiliated with the Orthodox. Some of both chose to remain independent, under the label "Status Quo". Many congregations split, polarized between progressive and traditional elements, to form two or even three new ones, each selecting a different affiliation. The liberal body, formed at the 1868 Congress in Pesth, was named the National Jewish Bureau. Its members were henceforth known colloquially as "Neologs" or "Congressionals".

The table presents the communal affiliation of Hungarian Jews (from 1920, only in post-Trianon territory).

Year	Congressionals/Neologs (%)	Autonomous Orthodox (%)	Status Quo (%)	Hungarian Jews (total)
1880	238,947 (38.2%)	350,456 (56.1%)	35,334 (5.7%)	624,737
1910	392,063 (43.1%)	472,373 (51.9%)	45,155 (5.0%)	909,591
1920	300,026 (63.4%)	146,192 (30.9%)	27,092 (5.7%)	473,310
1930	292,155 (65.7%)	134,972 (30.4%)	17,440 (3.9%)	444,567
1944	269,034 (62.1%)	156,418 (36.1%)	7,653 (1.8%)	433,105
1948	106,130 (79.3%)	23,451 (17.5%)	4,281 (3.2%)	133,862

== After 1871 ==
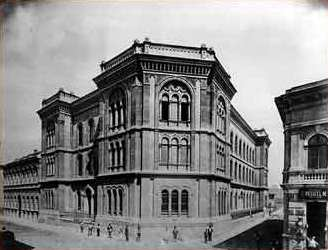
Budapest University of Jewish Studies, 1902.

The functionaries who headed the Bureau sought to minimize differences with the Orthodox. They hoped, among others, to refute the opposing party's claim that they constituted a separate religion. The Hungarian government accepted their stance and recognized the communal associations only as "fractions" (irányzat), stressing that all three belonged "one and the same denomination" (vallásfelekezethez). The Neolog leadership adopted a careful line in matters of faith and practice. Leopold Löw, who became increasingly independent in the 1860s, slid toward Geiger's positions and even boycotted the Congress, demonstrating sympathy for the Orthodox. He became estranged from the lay establishment of the Bureau. David Philipson, in his 1907 history of the Reform movement, wrote on the different factions in Hungarian Jewry: "religiously they are practically on the same footing. Religious Reform as conceived in Germany and realized in the United States is unknown." The 1911 Central Conference of American Rabbis' Year Book noted with disappointment: "in the Szegedin and Budapest reform temples, there are no mixed choirs, no family pews, no bareheaded praying and not even confirmation of boys and girls. As to the contents of the prayers themselves, they are the same as the Orthodox have." When Theodor Herzl's confirmation took place in 1873, his family had to hold it at home rather than in the Dohány Street Synagogue. The only Hungarian rabbi in the decades to come who administered some of the ritual changes proposed by Geiger was Ede Neumann, who served in Nagykanizsa from 1883 to 1918. Another attempt for more radical innovations was made by the Pesth layman Ernő Naményi, who founded the Isaiah Religious Association (Ézsaiás Vallásos Társaság) in the early 1930s. They held services inspired by Einhorn's 1848 group in private homes, which included prayers in Hungarian. The local congregation never allowed them to formally organize. In 1932, when Lily Montagu visited Budapest on behalf of the World Union for Progressive Judaism, she met several lay leaders but no Neolog rabbi attended for, as written by Raphael Patai, they "were all Conservative and hence opposed in principle to Liberal or Reform Judaism".

In 1877, the Budapest University of Jewish Studies was founded along the lines of its Breslau archetype. The large majority of rabbis who served in Congressional communities were graduates of the seminary. The main figures in its early years were scholars Moses Löb Bloch, David Kaufmann and Wilhelm Bacher. Judah Schweizer, who surveyed the religious positions of the Neolog rabbis throughout the years, concluded they rarely voiced their opinion. While congregations introduced synagogue organs, played by a non-Jew on the Sabbath, and mixed choirs, traditional liturgy was upheld; only few communities abolished Kol Nidre or Av HaRachamim. The Neolog rabbis also opposed legitimizing intermarriage when they were enabled in Hungary in 1896, after civil unions were authorized. They conducted marriage and divorce according to traditional standards. During the Second World War, when the government banned ritual slaughter on animal rights' grounds, the Neolog rabbinate refused to allow electric shock during the process, declaring an animal slaughtered after such treatment was not kosher. Schweitzer concluded that while the Neolog rabbis were extremely moderate in their approach, they had little influence over the congregants of the Bureau communities, who were inclined toward full assimilation and religiously lax, at best. Prominent rabbinical authorities among the Neologs included also Immanuel Löw of Szeged, Leopold's son, who was one of only two rabbis to be given permanent seat in the Hungarian Upper House of Parliament, alongside the Orthodox Koppel Reich.

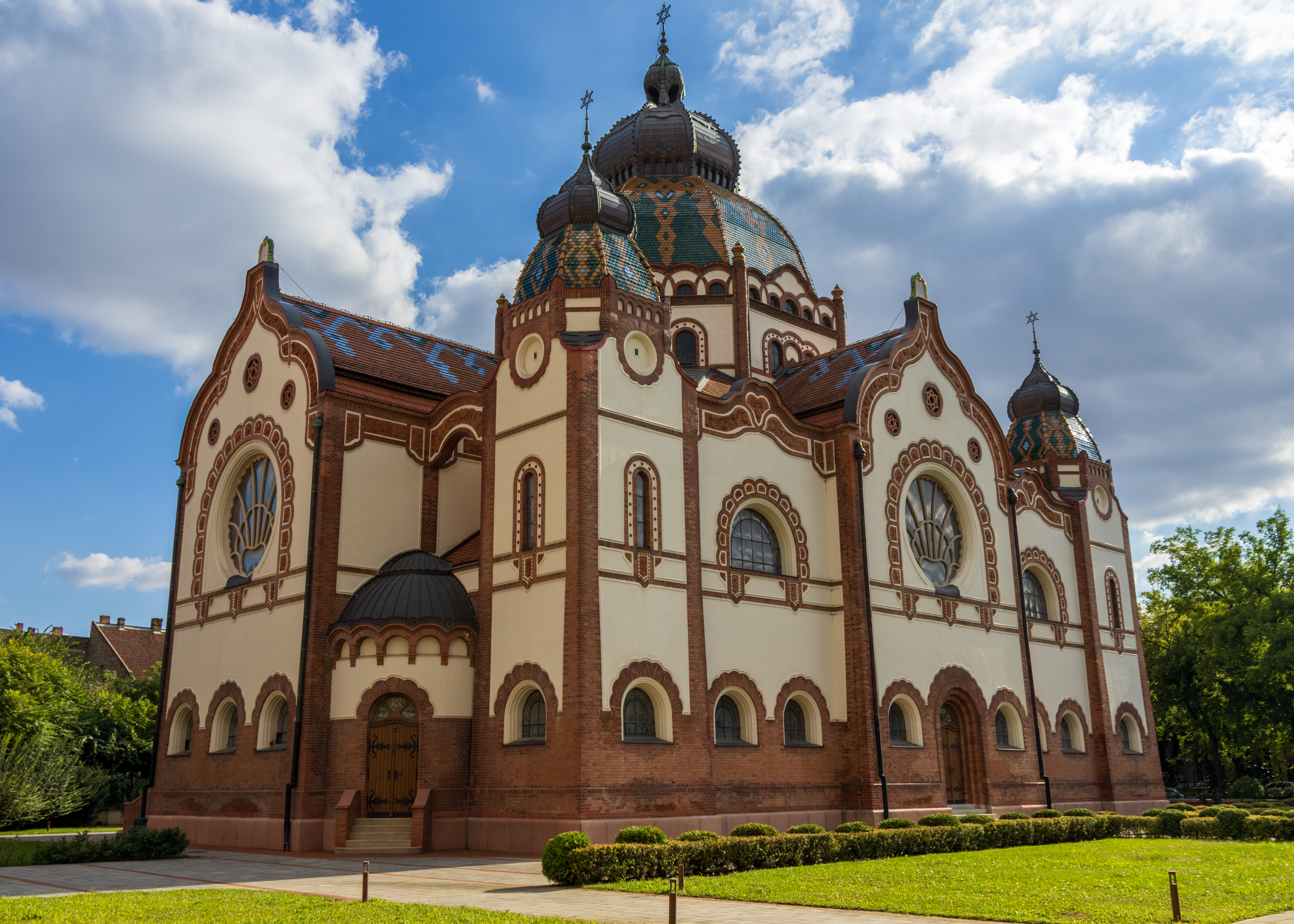
The Neolog Subotica Synagogue, Serbia.

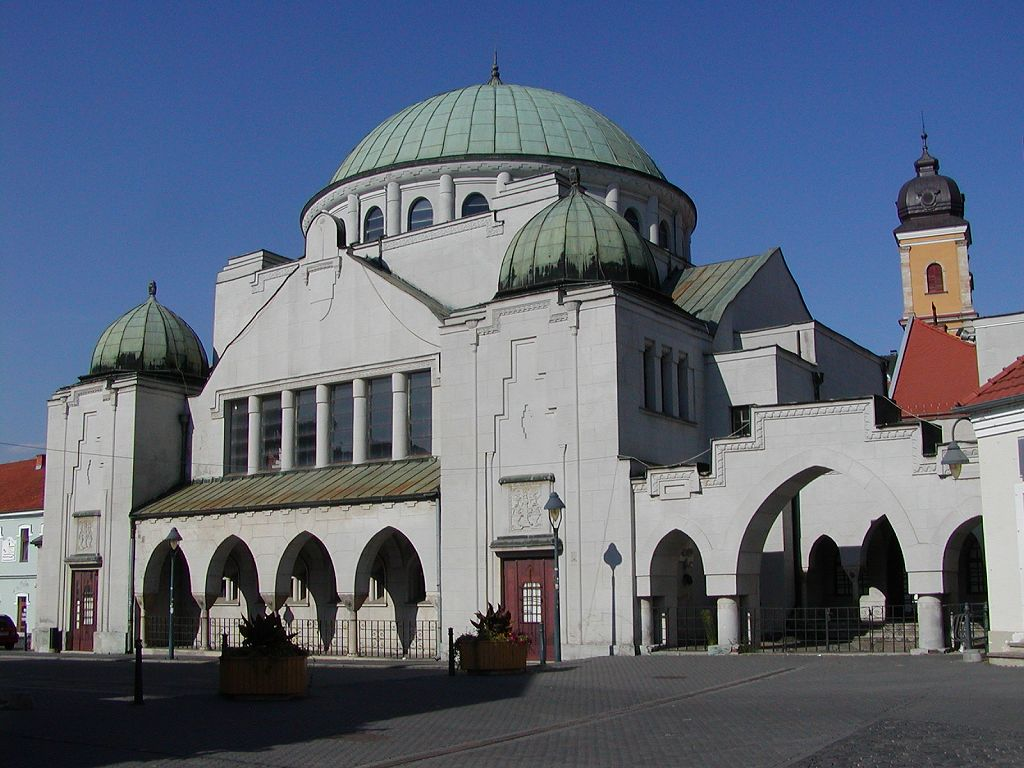
The Neolog Trenčín Synagogue, Slovakia.

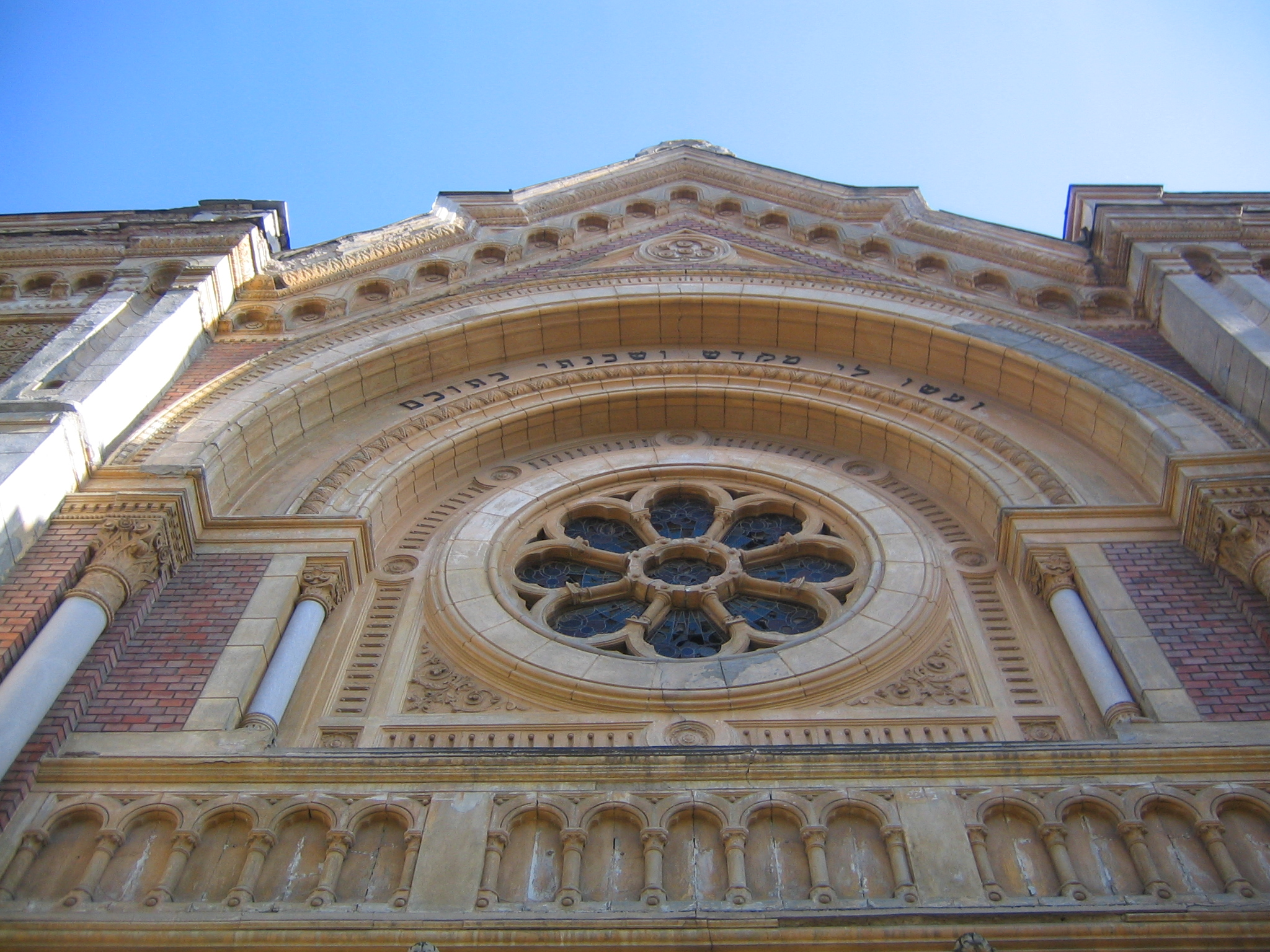
The Neolog Fabric Synagogue, Timișoara, Romania.

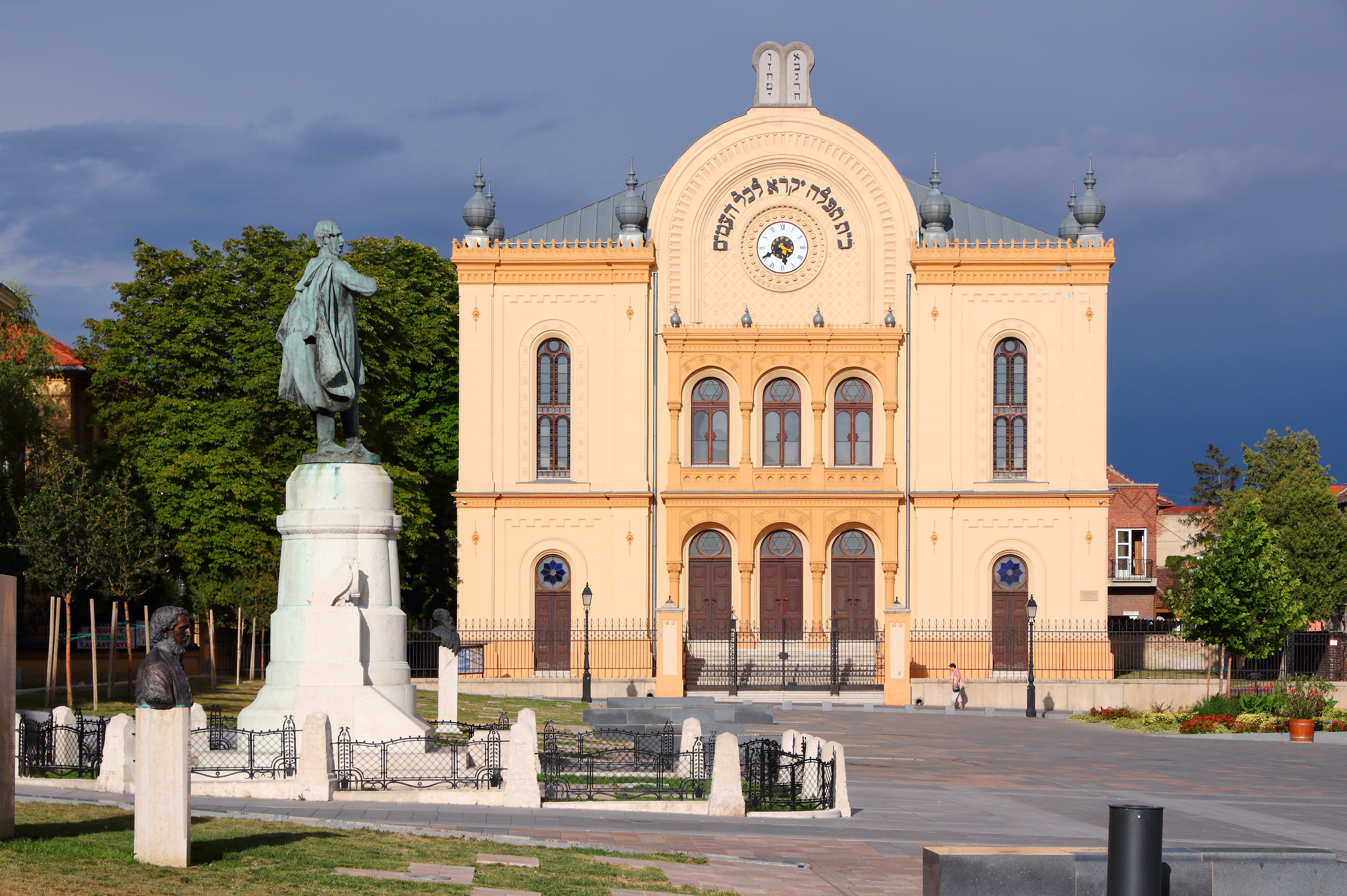
The 1869 Neolog Great Synagogue of Pécs, Hungary.

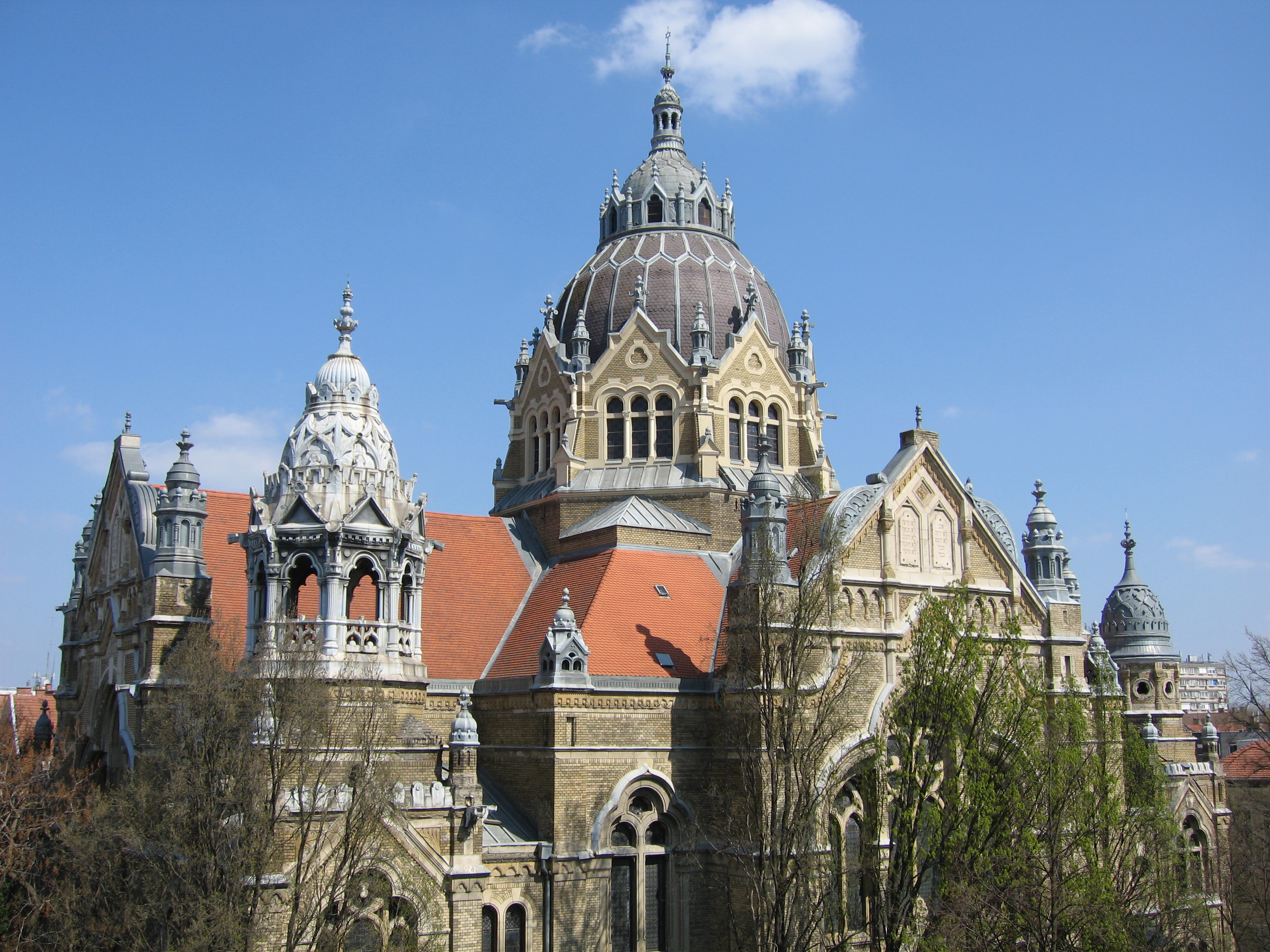
The Neolog Szeged Synagogue, Hungary.

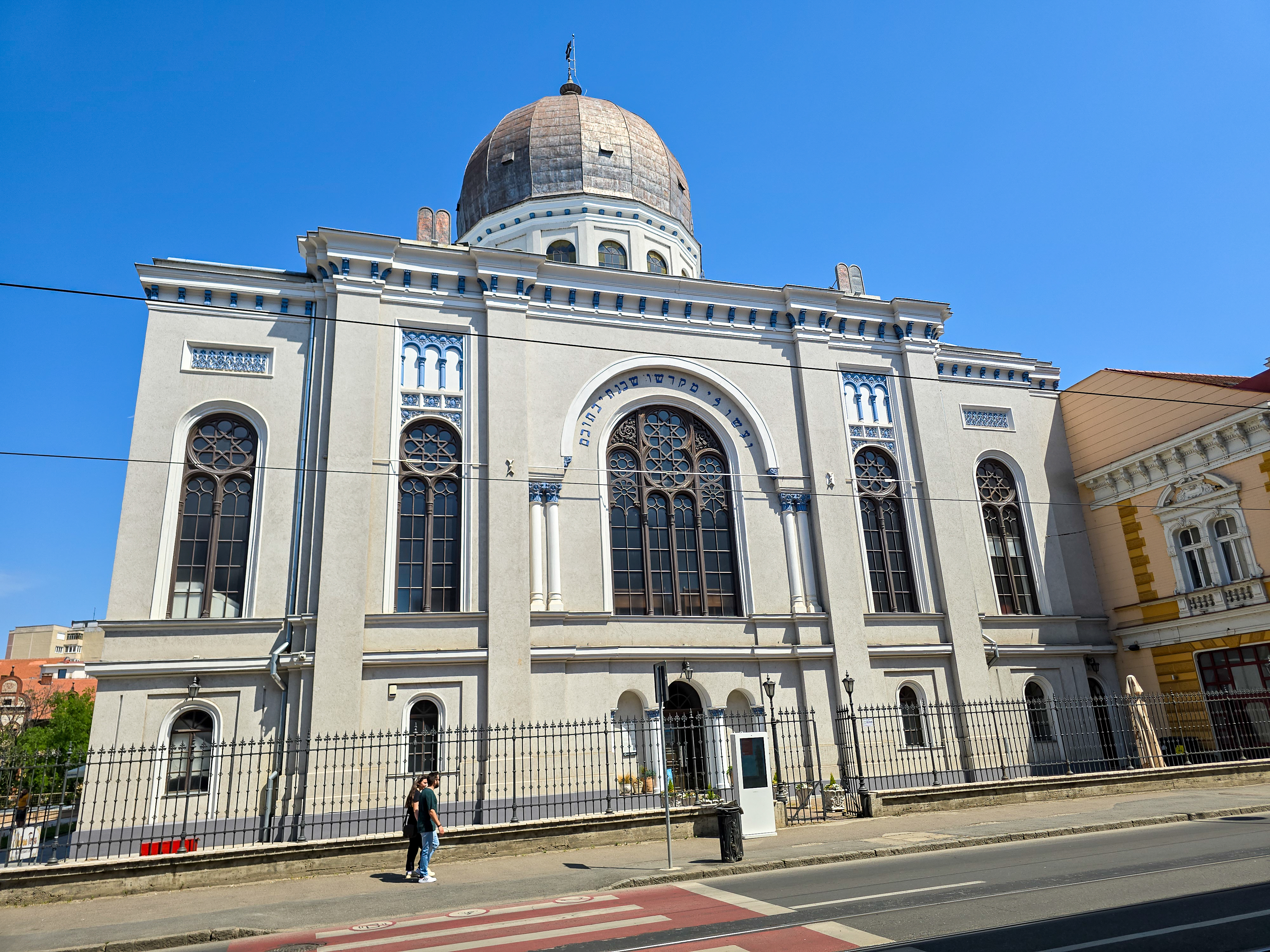
The Neolog Oradea Synagogue, Romania.

In 1896, there were 539 communities affiliated with the Neolog Bureau, 179 of which were mother congregations and the rest smaller ones, subordinated to one of the former. In 1944, prior to the deportation to the death camps, there were 167 such in Trianon Hungary. The majority of these communities were located in the north and west of the kingdom, in the economically developed areas. The Neologs, throughout history, were more affluent, urbanized and integrated than the Orthodox, and had more political clout. The campaigns for granting Judaism the status of an "accepted faith", legally recognized and subsidized by government funds, for installing chief rabbis as members of the Upper House of Parliament and against Antisemitism – in the 1890s, 1920s and 1930s, respectively – were led by the Congressionals. Pesth remained their stronghold: in 1880, its Neolog community numbered some 64,000 (as opposed to a few thousands of Orthodox in the city) out of 238,947 country-wide. In 1930, the congregation had 172,933 members, 59.2% of the Bureau's general membership. Tensions between the official, statewide leadership and the Budapest communal functionaries were sharp, as the latter virtually dominated Neolog politics. In 1932, after encountering strong resistance, the Pesth community president Samu Stern was elected Chairman of the Bureau, uniting both posts.

In the territories ceded in 1920, the communal separation of Hungarian Jewry remained legally sanctioned. In Slovakia and Carpathian Ruthenia, the 29 Neolog and 31 Status Quo congregations united to form a single federation in 1926, named "Jeschurun" from 1928. In Yugoslavia, the 70 Neolog communities constituted the majority of the Federation of Jewish Religious Congregations (Savez jevrejskih veroispovednih opština) founded in 1919, together with 38 Sephardi ones; the 12 Orthodox refused to join and formed a union of their own. In Romania, the 23 Neolog communities and 7 of the 11 local Status Quo communities united to form the "Western Rite Union of Transylvania and Banat". In 1922, the Neolog community of Rechnitz was the only one in Burgenland not to join the newly created Association of Autonomous Orthodox Congregations.

During the Holocaust, most Hungarian Jews perished. Subsequently, in the Hungarian People's Republic, all communal organizations were merged into the unified National Deputation of Hungarian Jews (MIOK). The Budapest Seminary remained the only rabbinic institute in the Eastern Bloc. The most prominent Neolog leader under Communism was its director, Rabbi Alexander Scheiber. With the emigration of virtually all Orthodox, the Neologs remained the vast majority. After the fall of the Iron Curtain, communal independence was restored. In 1989, the Federation of Jewish Communities (MAZSIHISZ) was founded as a non-fractional body. It became de facto Neolog after the small Orthodox minority seceded in 1994. As of 2022, there were 42 synagogues affiliated with the movement operating in Hungary. Of 15,695 Jews who chose to donate part of their income to one of the fractions, 11,885 (75.7%) gave theirs to the Neolog. While Conservative Judaism regards them as a fraternal, "non-Orthodox but halakhic" movement, the two are unaffiliated.
