= Immanuel Löw =

Hungarian rabbi, botanist, and politician (1854–1944)

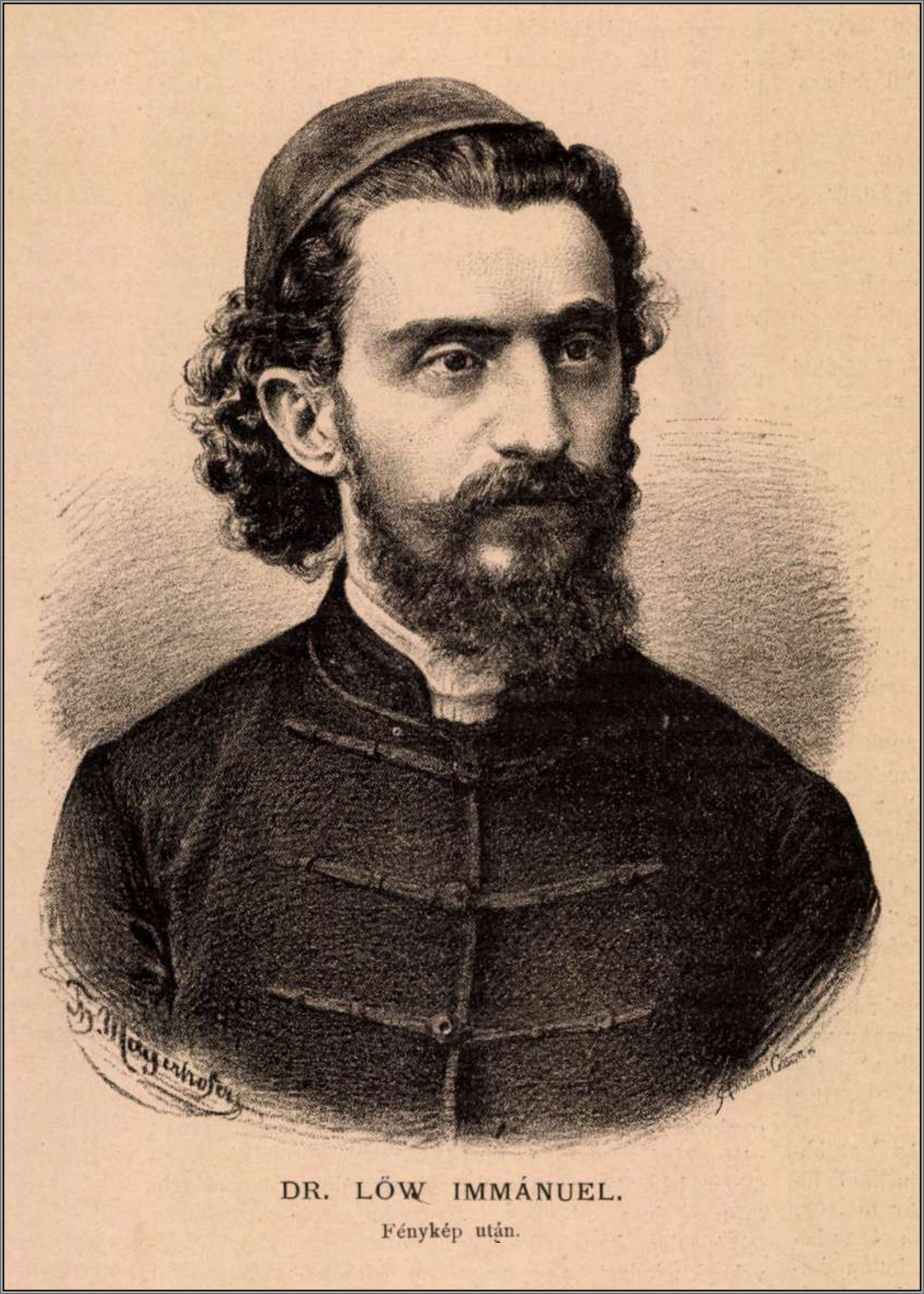
Immanuel Löw

Immanuel Löw (January 20, 1854 in Szeged – July 19, 1944 in Budapest) was a Hungarian rabbi and scholar, botanist and politician.

== Life ==
Löw was the son of Leopold Löw whom he succeeded in 1878 as rabbi of Szeged, Hungary, and whose collected works he published (5 vols., 1889–1900). He was educated in his native town and in Berlin, where he studied at the Hochschule für die Wissenschaft des Judentums, graduating as rabbi and receiving his Ph.D. from the University of Leipzig in 1878.

The Szeged Synagogue built in 1903 was designed according to Löw's plans. In the 'White Terror' of 1920–21 he was imprisoned for 13 months for alleged statements against Admiral Miklós Horthy. While in prison, he worked on his four volume work Die Flora der Juden (“The Flora of the Jews”), on terminology of plants in Jewish sources.

Like his father, Löw was a great preacher in the Hungarian language, and several hundred of his sermons were published in four volumes between 1900 and 1939. On the occasion of his congregation's centenary he published (with Z. Kulinyi) the congregation's history (1885) and that of its ḥevra kaddisha (with S. Klein, 1887). In 1883 he published a prayer book (in Hungarian) for women, and rendered the Song of Songs and some psalms into the same language.

From 1927 he represented the Neolog communities in the upper chamber of the Hungarian parliament and also was a member of the Jewish Agency for Palestine. Soon after his 90th birthday, the Germans occupied Hungary and Löw was first sent to a brick factory in the local ghetto and then put on a deportation train. In Budapest, however, he was freed by Zionist workers. He died that year in Budapest.

== Scholarly work ==
Löw’s fame as a scholar is based primarily on his pioneering work in the field of Talmud and rabbinic lexicography and in the study of plant names. This special interest is apparent in his doctoral thesis "Aramäische Pflanzennamen" ("Aramaic Plant Names") (1879) as well as in "Meleagros aus Gadara und die Flora Aramaea" (1883). Löw systematically explored the basics of plant terminology in different periods of the Hebrew and Aramaic languages, dominated the latest scientific methods in this field, made himself familiar with literary sources of plant names, and made careful use of manuscript material. With the help of Semitic languages, especially Syriac, he clarified many etymologies. He had great influence on future scholars, particularly Yehuda Feliks, who considered him one of the greatest scholars of Jewish botany.

Both in the field of wildlife as well as minerals, he published more articles in scholarly publications. He wrote Mineralien der Juden (“Minerals of the Jews”), but his manuscript was lost during the Holocaust in 1944. A part of his literary legacy went on to the National Library of Israel in Jerusalem, and another part to the Rabbinical Seminary of Budapest.

His essays on fauna and minerals were reissued in 1969 ("Fauna und Mineralien der Juden") together with an introduction by Alexander Scheiber.
