= European Geniza =

Jewish book or manuscript fragments

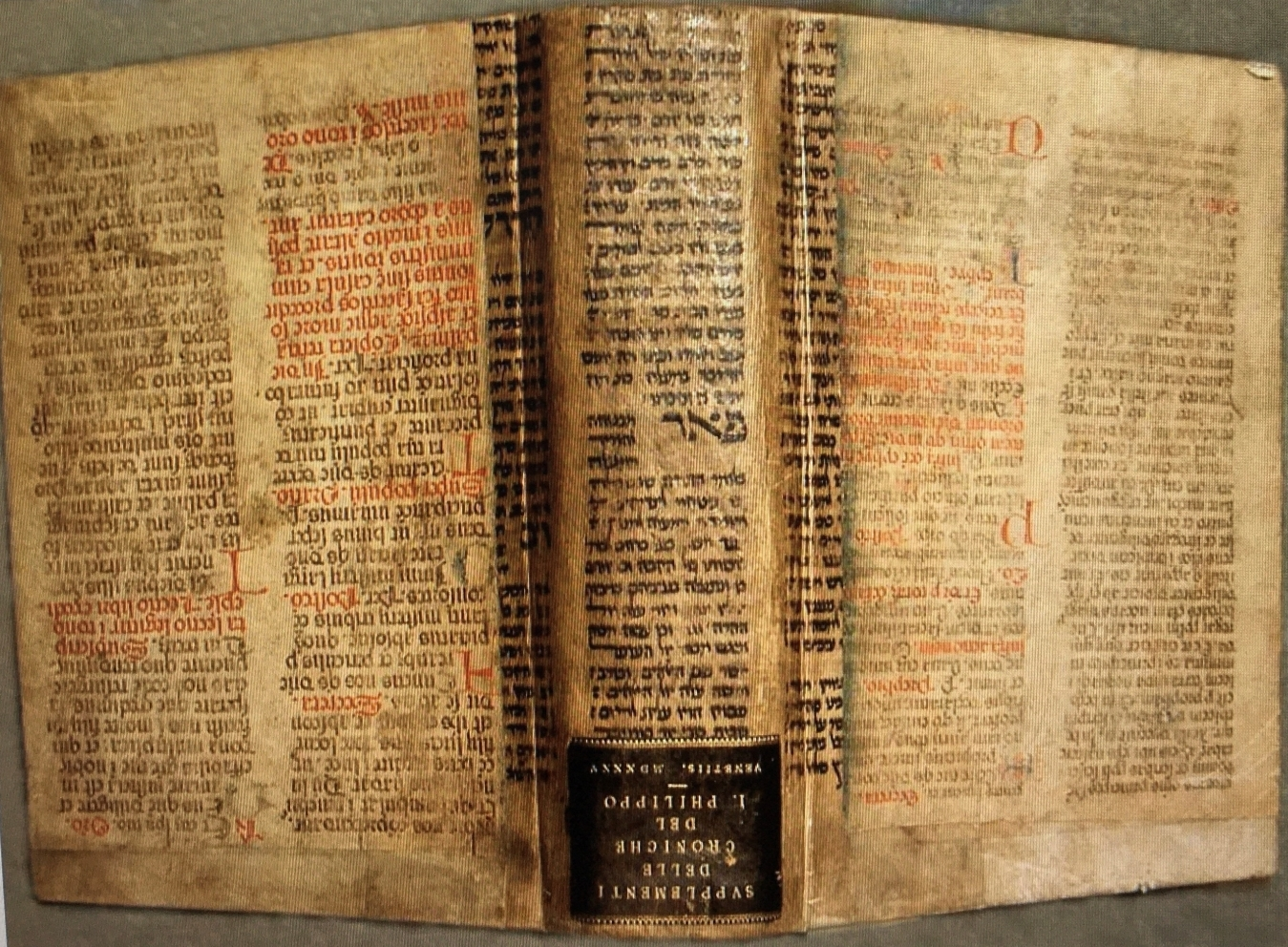
Commentary to the piyyutim of Shavu'ot and "The earth below make a noise" by Eleazar ha-Qalir. Book by Giacomo Filippo Foresti published in 16th c. Venice with folios from a 12th c. manuscript of Halakhot Gedolot, found in Bologna and in Leipzig University Library

The European Geniza (the Treasure of Europe, Italian Genizah or Genizat Germania) is an international collection of thousands of Jewish book or manuscript fragments in Hebrew that have been recovered from medieval or early modern book bindings and archival covers, i.e. "books within books", where they had been recycled by non-Jewish publishers, accidentally preserving them for later recovery and study. The name is a conceptual analogy to the Cairo Geniza, though it has no actual relationship to that collection, and there is no specific physical European geniza.

== Overview ==
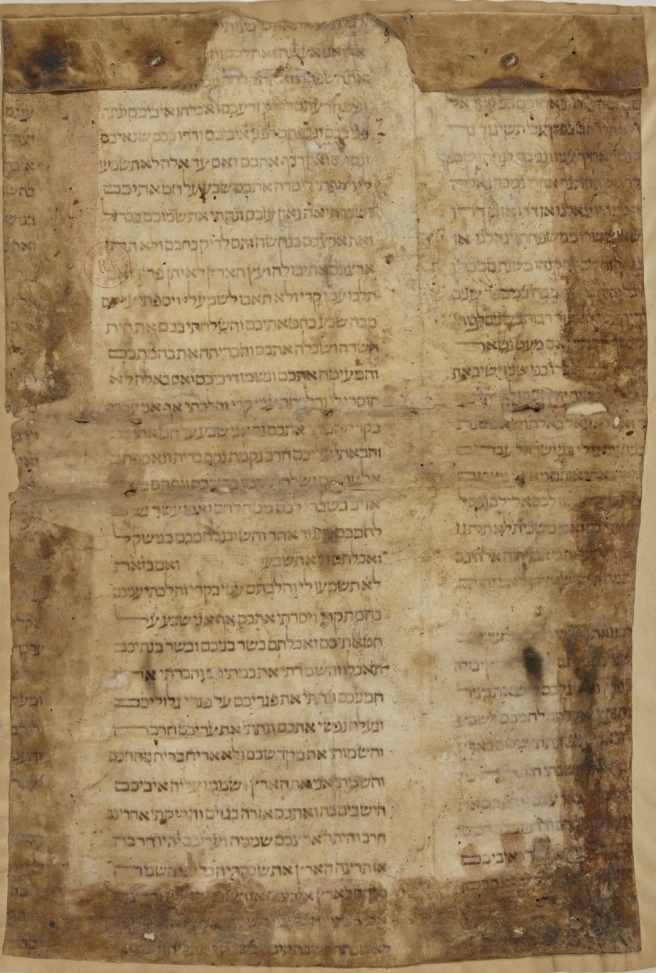
15th century bible fragment, Bibliothèque nationale de France.

The metaphor is imperfect as the European Geniza is not actually a geniza nor were its fragments necessarily found in one. It is however, possible that abandoned synagogue genizas, along with stolen manuscripts or abandoned possessions from expelled Jewish owners, did provide material for bookbinders. The recycling of manuscripts for Jewish and non-Jewish publishing was common, and Christian work can be found in both Jewish and Christian bindings as well. Old manuscripts may have also been sold by university libraries, or possibly by Jewish owners themselves, though the latter may not be very likely. At least one work from the Cairo Geniza has made it into the European, i.e. into a binding, a Babylonian Talmud fragment from Joseph Rosh ha-Seder. There are also at least several instances of a Hebrew book bound by Christian publishers with another Hebrew manuscript, such as an Esther scroll or a Pentateuch, in the binding. Samuel de Medina and Jacob Emden both attest to the practice of recycling extraneous or leftover manuscript pages from the printing press in Jewish publishing as well, though this does not account for use of Torah scrolls, for example, which probably would not have been recycled this way by Jewish publishers.

The majority of fragments to date were found in Italy, with over 16,000 discovered, followed by Spain and Germany with about 2500 each apiece, with fewer than 900 in Austria and under 400 in Hungary. The estimate of possibly up to 30,000 fragments is more than double the number of known medieval published Hebrew volumes.

The main reason for recycling manuscripts was the high price for book materials, and anti-Jewish riots, expulsions, and confiscations made Hebrew manuscripts readily available. This was aided by anti-Jewish proclamations such as the papal bullae of Pope Julius III in 1553 ordering the confiscation of Hebrew books. The importance and value of the European Geniza can be explained in part as a result of the Church's seizures and burning of Hebrew books, which led to their scarcity in surviving to the modern day.

Medieval Hebrew Bible manuscripts are frequently found in bindings. Works such as an Ashkenazic maqama or a previously unknown recension of Toledot Yeshu have been recovered, as well as ketubbot, medical texts, mystical works, halakhic works of various types, and lexicographic works such as a Hebrew-Old French glossary. This collection of texts also contains many copies of works such as the Targum, tractates of the Talmudim, midrashim and other rabbinic works. One example of the type of material in the European Geniza is a 15th-century Italian-Jewish moneylending pawn shop's accounting ledger, one of the earliest known. A lost commentary by Joseph Kara, who was not thought to have composed it, was recovered as well. The works of Nachmanides and Menahem Recanati have also been found. Other inclusions are an Alexander Romance, astrological work by Abraham ibn Ezra, taqqanot, piyyutim, wills, bills of sale, Megillat Taanit, commentaries of Chananel ben Chushiel, Eliezer ben Samuel, Eliezer ben Joel HaLevi, and responsa of Meir of Rothenburg edited by his brother Abraham.

== Historiography ==
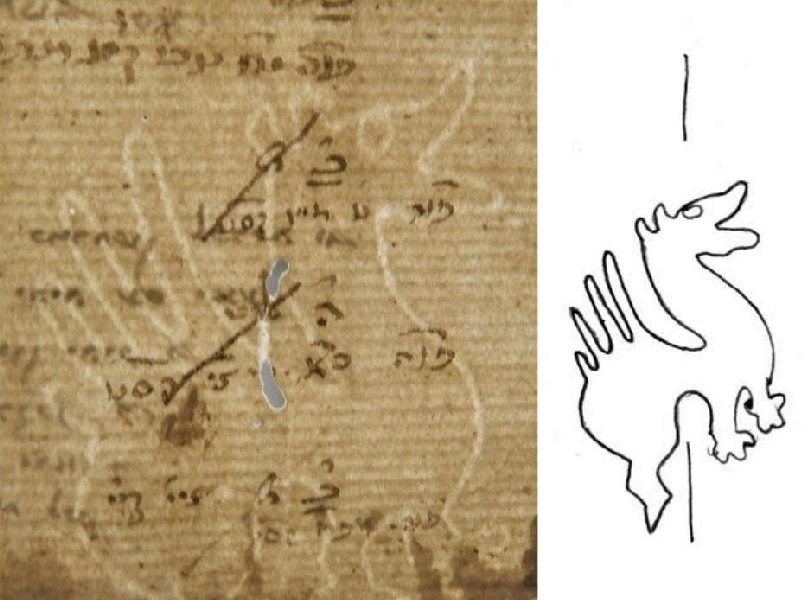
14th-15th century watermark found in an account book from Bologna, depicting a basilisk or dragon, next to facsimile. Corpus Christi College Library.

In the early 13th century, Yehuda HeHasid cautioned against the practice of binding Hebrew books with non-Jewish manuscript fragments:

One should not cover his book with parchment upon which romances are written. It once happened that someone covered his Bible with leather, upon which was written foreign nonsense – an account of the wars of gentile kings. A righteous man came and tore it off and removed it.

Two hasidim had books that they needed to bind, and there was a priest in town who was more adept at bookbinding than the Jews. One of the hasidim would give his books to a Jew who was not as adept as the priest, for he said [...] that if the gentile would do the binding, he would demean the books, and perhaps he would cut up the remnants and use them to repair his invalid books. His fellow said [...] that it is not forbidden to give them other books to bind with the boards that they study. He would stand over [the gentile bookbinder] so that he would not use the remnants for his invalid books.

Jehiel b. Jedidja in the 16th century protested the practice of binding books with fragments of religiously important manuscripts:

I have often seen it practiced, due to our manifold sins, that books are bound with the most sacred of sacred books, which are filled with God's glory. They become blurred, and [God's] holy and blessed name is erased [...] It is proper to raise a cry like a ram's horn and preach publicly to remove this stumbling block from our midst.

Joseph Yuspa Nördlinger Hahn wrote in the 17th century, making reference to the practice of ransoming or redeeming sacred Jewish manuscripts that had fallen into the hands or books of non-Jews:

It is strictly forbidden to bind books with pages taken from parchments of sacred books. If a gentile bookbinder erroneously bound a Jew's book with parchments taken from sacred works, the book's owner must remove the binding. He should not be concerned about the cost of the binding, which was for naught, for it is better for him to lose his money and not treat sacred works disgracefully, constantly, without interruption. Even though I have heard that there are some people who are lenient in a case where the book had already been bound, their reasoning being that it is commendable that the manuscript page remain in the binding, for in that way it will continue to be treated with sanctity along with the book in which it is bound, and if, on the contrary, he removes the manuscript page, since it is small, it might become lost, for it is only a single fragment [...] The wise man should have the foresight, when he gives his books to a bookbinder, to stipulate that he not bind the books with parchment from manuscripts of sacred works. Even though people think that a person acts commendably when he has his books bound with manuscript pages taken from sacred works, for if they remain in the hands of the non-Jew, he will use them in the bindings of other books, and so the pages will certainly suffer much greater disgrace – in my opinion, this argument should be rejected [...] Should someone argue that this being the case, when a person knows that a bookbinder has a manuscript page from a sacred work, he must buy it from him in order to rescue it from disgrace – it seems to me that there is no such obligation, for our Sages said that sacred books should not be ransomed at more than their value, and parchment for binding is far more expensive than a study book, in particular today when printing is so common [...]

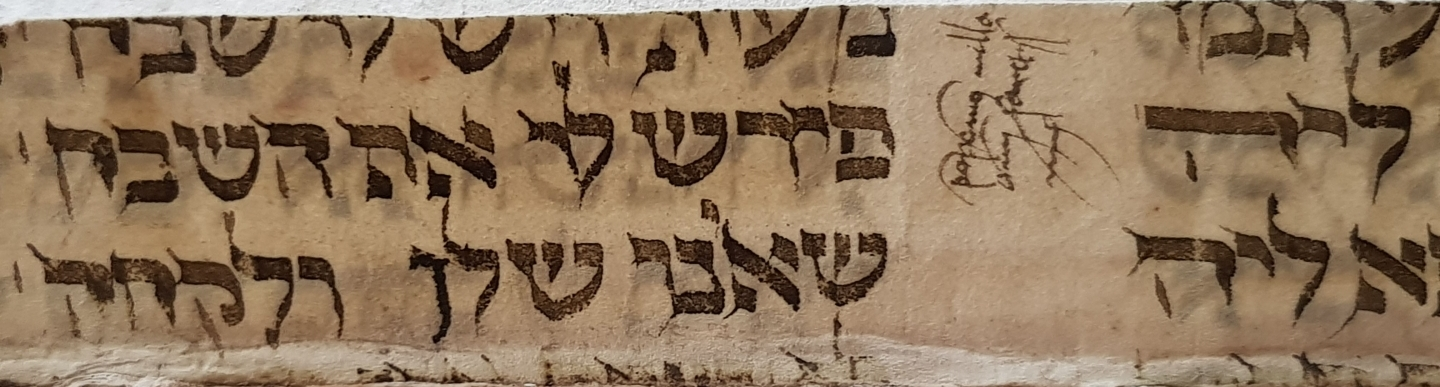
Fragment of Talmud found in stitching of 14th c. book by John of Jandun found in Jagiellonian Library, Poland

Jeremias Friedrich Reuß wrote about taking a bible manuscript from a binding in 1780, later leading Adelbert von Keller to make an inventory of fragments in 1840. Heinrich Ewald misidentified several fragments in 1860, which was critiqued by Jacob Caro, Abraham Geiger, and Ludwig Philippson. Heimann Jolowicz (1816-1875) also published work on fragments, dedicated to Leopold Zunz, as did Abraham Berliner (1833-1915) and Moritz Steinschneider (1816-1907), though he was not very interested in fragments and misidentified one brought to him by Valentin Rose. Jacob Bassfreund (1850-1919) published fragments from incunabula, and Gustav Kohfeldt in 1913 in Mainz. In the 19th century, Sándor Scheiber, professor and rector of the Rabbinical Seminary in Budapest, helped connect this group of texts metaphorically with the Cairo Geniza, which is technically not related. Fragments were also catalogued by Arthur Zacharias Schwarz. A catalog of the materials was compiled by Jacob Nahum Epstein. Research intensified in the 1980s.

== See also ==
- Genisa Niederzissen
- Palimpsest
- Afghan Geniza
- Binding waste
- Fragmentology (manuscripts)
- Conservation and restoration of books, manuscripts, documents and ephemera
- Palaeography
- Codicology
