= József Bánóczi =

Hungarian Jewish scholar (1849–1926)

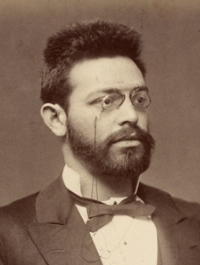
- Born: 4 July 1849; Veszprém, Kingdom of Hungary
- Died: 1926 (77 years)
- Occupation: Scholar

József Bánóczi (July 4, 1849 – 1926) was a Hungarian Jewish scholar.

Bánóczi was born in Szentgál, Veszprém, Hungary. He was educated at the schools of his native town, and afterwards at the universities of Budapest, Vienna, Berlin, Göttingen, and Leipsic, and then went to Paris and London to finish his studies. Bánóczi became in 1878 privat-docent of philosophy at the University of Budapest, in 1879 member of the Hungarian Academy of Sciences, and in 1892 member of the Landesschulrath (royal board of education).

Bánóczi also occupied various positions in the Jewish community. From 1877 to 1893 he was a professor at the Budapest Jewish Theological Seminary, and in 1887 he became principal of the Budapest normal school for the education of teachers. In 1896 he was secretary of the Hungarian Society for the Promotion of Jewish Literature and in 1897 member of the Delegation of Hungarian Jews.

At the insistence of Dr. Beck, the Bucharest rabbi, Bánóczi and Prof. Wilhelm Bacher took the necessary steps to save from certain ruin the congregation and schools of the sect of Szekler Sabbatarians in Transylvania who converted to Judaism in 1868.

Bánóczi, together with Bernát Alexander, edited the Filozofiai Írók Tára; he also edited Erdélyi's philosophical writings (1885), and the works of Károly Kisfaludy, 6 vols., 1893.

He was a contributor to the Philosophische Monatshefte and many Hungarian literary magazines, and published papers in the programs of the Normal School for Teachers. As one of the founders and editors of the Yearbook of the Jewish Hungarian Literary Association, he supervised the translation of the Hebrew Bible into Hungarian.

== Works ==
- Kant's Lehre von Raum und Zeit (1875)
- a translation of G. H. Lewes' "History of Philosophy" into Hungarian, 3 vols., 1876–78
- Révai Miklós Elete és Munkái, crowned by the Hungarian Royal Academy of Sciences in 1879
- Magyar Romanticismus
- a translation of some of Schopenhauer's works into Hungarian, 1882; 2d ed., 1892
- Emlékbeszéd Greguss Agostról, 1889
- translation of Kant's Kritik der Reinen Vernunft into Hungarian jointly with Professor Alexander, 1891
- translation of Jacob Burckhardt's Cultur der Renaissance in Italien into Hungarian, 2 vols., 1895-96.

Contributions to Jewish literature:

- A History of the First Decade of the Budapest Jewish Theological Seminary (Hungarian and German), 1888
- ed., jointly with W. Bacher, the Hungaro-Jewish Review ("Magyar Zsidó Szemle"), 7 vols., 1884–90
- ed., also with Bacher, Eokönyo, the year-book of the Hungarian Society for the Promotion of Jewish Literature, 3 vols., 1897-99.
