= Róbert Frölich =

Hungarian rabbi (born 1965)

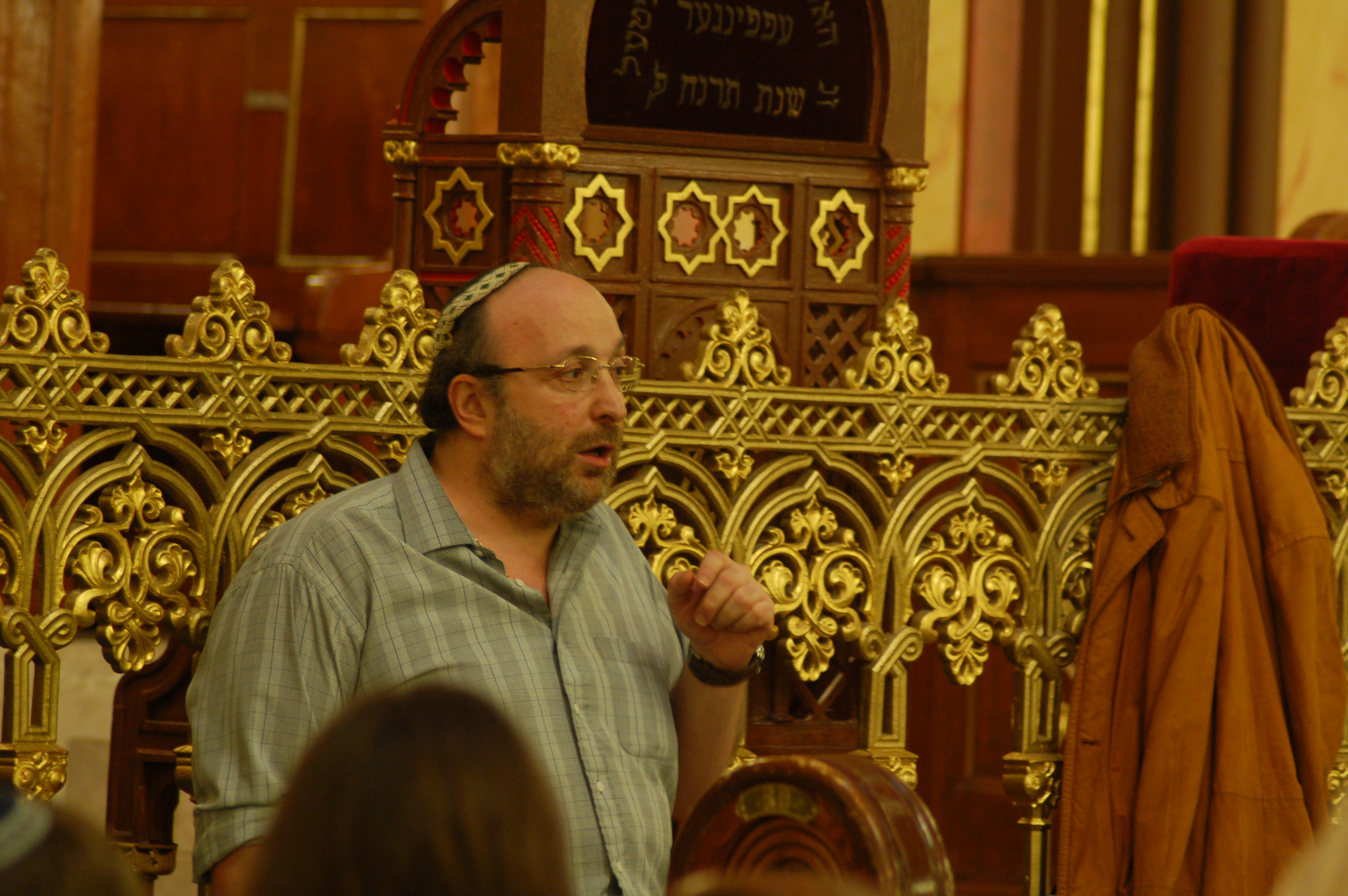
Frölich at the Dohány Street Synagogue in 2010.

Róbert Frölich (also spelled Fröhlich) (born 12 November 1965, Budapest) is a Hungarian rabbi and retired brigadier general, former camp chief rabbi, and, since 2015, chief rabbi of the Dohány Street Synagogue.

== Life ==
Frölich graduated from the Anne Frank Gymnasium in 1984. He completed his undergraduate studies at the Budapest University of Jewish Studies and was ordained as a rabbi in 1990. He completed additional training in Jerusalem in 1990 and 1991.

Between 1986 and 1988, he worked as a religious teacher at the Bethlen Square Synagogue. Frölich became a deputy rabbi at the Dózsa György Street synagogue in 1989. He was named as rabbi at the Újpest synagogue 1990. Following his brief tenure in Újpest, he replaced the rabbi at the Pava Street Synagogue. Since 1993, he has been the rabbi at the Dohány Street Synagogue. On 5 January 2015, Dávid Schwerzoff, then head of the Budapest Jewish Community, dismissed Frölich over alleged irregularities in the procurement of a gate system for the synagogue. However, the community of the Dohány Street Synagogue and the Rabbinical Board rejected the dismissal and confirmed Frölich in his position on January 8.

In addition to the religious teaching career, he also had a military (military chaplain) career. In 1991, he became a teacher at the Lauder Javne Secular Jewish School and the Anne Frank Gymnasium, leaving the former in 1993. After leaving the Anna Frank Gymnasium in 1996, he became a lecturer at the Budapest University of Jewish Studies. Since 1998 he has held the position of adjunct professor.

In 1991 he joined the Ministry of Defence, where he first worked as a religious expert in the Office of Ecclesiastical Experts. In 1993 he became an assistant chaplain in the Military Chaplaincy Office. From there, in 1994, he was promoted to chief field rabbi—head of the Field Chaplaincy Service's Jewish Chaplaincy Branch, the Field Rabbinate—with the rank of colonel. In 1995 he was appointed brigadier general. He retired from active military service in 2012, and was succeeded as chief field rabbi by Péter Joel Tóth.

In February 2015, following the death of József Schweitzer, the National Rabbinical Council chose him as successor, and as a result the MAZSIHISZ general assembly appointed him National Chief Rabbi on July 27. He resigned from this mainly ceremonial post on April 11, 2018, because he disagreed with the leadership's then-current direction within the religious organization. After his resignation no new chief rabbi was elected; these duties were carried out by Zoltán Radnóti until 2021, when Frölich was re-elected and has since continued to serve as National Chief Rabbi.

He is married with two children.
