= Szentgál =

- Flag Coat of arms

- Location of Veszprém county in Hungary

- Location of Szentgál
- Coordinates: 47.11385°N 17.73413°E
- Country: Hungary
- County: Veszprém

Area
  - Total: 94.99 km^{2} (36.68 sq mi)

Population (2004)
  - Total: 2,847
  - Density: 29.97/km^{2} (77.6/sq mi)
- Time zone: UTC+1 (CET)
  - Summer (DST): UTC+2 (CEST)
- Postal code: 8444
- Area code: 88

Szentgál is a village in Veszprém county, Hungary. It is best known for the series of caves in the surrounding area.

== Notable residents ==
- József Bánóczi (1849–1926), Hungarian Jewish scholar
