= Wilhelm Bacher =

Hungarian scholar, rabbi and linguist (1850–1913)

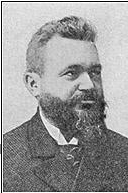
Wilhelm Bacher

Wilhelm Bacher (Hungarian: Bacher Vilmos; Yiddish: בִּנְיָמִין־זְאֵב בּאַכֿר, Hebrew: בִּנְיָמִין־זְאֵב בכר Benjamin Ze'ev Bacher; 12 January 1850 – 25 December 1913) was a Jewish Hungarian scholar, rabbi, Orientalist and linguist, born in Liptó-Szent-Miklós, Hungary (today Liptovský Mikuláš, Slovakia) to the Hebrew writer Simon Bacher. Wilhelm was himself a prolific writer, authoring or co-authoring approximately 750 works. He was a contributor to many encyclopedias, and was a major contributor to the landmark Jewish Encyclopedia throughout all its 12 volumes (Dotan 1977). Although almost all of Bacher's works were written in German or Hungarian, at the urging of Hayyim Nahman Bialik many were subsequently translated into Hebrew by Alexander Siskind Rabinovitz.

== Education ==
Wilhelm attended the Hebrew schools in Szucsány and in his native town, and passed through the higher classes of the Evangelical Lyceum at Presburg from 1863 to 1867, at the same time diligently prosecuting Talmudic studies.

In 1867, he began the study of philosophy and of Oriental languages—the latter under Ármin Vámbéry—at the University of Budapest, and also attended the lectures on the Talmud given by Samuel Löb Brill. In 1868, he went to Breslau, where he continued the study of philosophy and philology at the University, and that of theology at the Jewish Theological Seminary of Breslau. He graduated at the University of Leipsic in 1870. His graduation thesis, Nizâmî's Leben und Werke, und der Zweite Theil des Nizâmî'schen Alexanderbuches, appeared in 1871, and was translated into English in 1873 by S. Robinson. This was afterward incorporated in the collection entitled Persian Poetry for English Readers. In 1876, Bacher graduated as rabbi, and shortly afterward was appointed to the rabbinate in Szeged, which had become vacant in consequence of the death of Leopold Löw.

== Official positions ==
On 1 July 1877, together with Moses Bloch and David Kaufmann, he was appointed by the Hungarian government to the professorship of the newly created Budapest University of Jewish Studies. Bacher delivered the inaugural address in the name of the faculty at the opening of the institution on 4 October 1877, and remained as teacher of the Biblical sciences, of Jewish history, and of various other branches at that institution. Bacher was for a time in 1878 field-chaplain in the Austro-Hungarian army, being delegated to the headquarters of the army of occupation in Bosnia.

The congregation of Pest, Hungary appointed Bacher director of the Talmud-Torah School in 1885. In 1884, Bacher and Joseph Bánóczi founded the Judæo-Hungarian review, the Magyar Zsidó Szemle, which they conjointly edited during the first seven years. In 1894, he assisted in founding the Judæo-Hungarian Literary Society, Izraelita Magyar Irodami Társulat, of which he became vice-president in 1898. This society instituted a new translation of the Bible into Hungarian—the first complete translation due solely to Jewish initiative. The first five year-books of the society were edited by Bacher in conjunction with F. Mezey and afterward with D. Bánóczi.

== Voluminous author ==
Bacher is the author of the following works:

- Muslicheddin Sa'adî's Aphorismen und Sinngedichte, zum Ersten Male Herausgegeben und Uebersetzt, mit Beiträgen zur Biographie Sa'adi's, 1879.
- Several contributions to the history of Persian literature in Z. D. M. G.
- Kritische Untersuchungen zum Prophetentargum, ib. 1874.
- Discussions of the Targum on Job and the Psalms, in Monatsschrift, 1871, 1872.
- Abraham ibn Ezra's Einleitung zu Seinem Pentateuchcommentar, als Beitrag zur Geschichte der Bibelexegese Beleuchtet, in Sitzungsberichte der Kaiserlichen Akademie der Wissenschaften, 1876.
- Die Grammatische Terminologie des Jehuda b. David Hajjugs, ib. 1882.
- Die Hebräisch-Arabische Sprachvergleichung des Abulwalîd Merwân ibn Ganachs, ib. 1884.
- Die Hebräisch-Neuhebräische Sprachvergleichung des Abulwalîd, ib. 1885.
- Die Agada der Babylonischen Amoräer (First Annual Report of the Landes-rabbinerschule at Budapest, 1878; also printed separately). This work, like all others published in the annual reports of the National Rabbinical Institute, was published contemporaneously in Hungarian.
- Abraham Ibn Ezra als Grammatiker, ib. 1881
- Leben und Werke des Abulwalîd Merwân Ibn Gānāḥ und die Quellen Seiner Schrifterklärung, ib. 1885.
- Aus der Schrifterklärung des Abulwalîd Merwân ibn Gānāḥ, 1889.
- Die Bibelexegese der Jüdischen Religionsphilosophen des Mittelalters vor Maimûni, 1892.
- Die Bibelexegese Moses Maimûni's, 1896.
- Ein Hebräisch-Persisches Wörterbuch aus dem Vierzehnten Jahrhundert, 1900.
- Die Agada der Tannaïten. The first volume of this work was published in H. Grätz's Monatsschrift from 1882 to 1884, and also appeared in 1884 in a separate edition in honor of the ninetieth birthday of L. Zunz; the second volume was published in 1890. A second, enlarged edition of Vol. I. appeared in 1902.
- The three volumes of the Agada der Palästinischen Amoräer appeared respectively in 1892, 1896, and 1899.
- Kitâb al-Luma', Le Lion des Parterres Fleuris, in publications of the Ecole des Hautes Etudes, Paris, 1886. Bacher's revised edition of this work was published under Derenbourg's name.
- An edition of the Book of Job as translated by Saadia in Derenbourg's edition of Saadia's works (Œuvres Complètes de R. Saadia, Volume Cinquième, Paris, 1900).
- An edition of the Sefer Zikkaron, or Hebrew Grammar of Joseph Ḳimḥi, published in writings of the society Meḳiẓe Nirdamim, 1888.
- Sefer ha-Shorashim, Wurzelwörterbuch der Hebräischen Sprache, von Abulwalîd Merwân ibn Gānāḥ, aus dem Arabischen ins Hebräische Uebersetzt von Jehudah ibn Tibbon, mit einer Einleitung über das Leben und die Schriften Abulwalîd's und mit Registern und einem Anhange, Nebst Textberichtigungen zum Sefer Versehen. This is an edition of the Hebrew translation of Abulwalîd's great lexicon, the principal grammatical work of that author. In this work, also published by the society Meḳiẓe Nirdamim, Bacher corrected the Hebrew text in accordance with the Arabic original, and mentioned the sources of all the Biblical and other citations contained in it, which sources are not given in A. Neubauer's edition.
- A compilation of the various readings of Ibn Ezra's Commentary on the Pentateuch in Berliner's Magazin, and separately, 1894—a work prepared with the aid of a valuable codex belonging to the university library at Cambridge.
- Sefer Naḥalat Yehoshua', 2 vols., a redaction of the posthumous works of the Talmudist Kosman Wodianer (d. 1830), with a biographical introduction in Hebrew, in connection with which he prepared a list of the correspondents of Moses Sofer, Aus der Ersten Hālfte Unseres Jahrhunderts, 1893.
- Sha'ar Shim'on, an edition of the Hebrew poems of his father, Simon Bacher (d. Nov. 9, 1891), with a biographical introduction in Hebrew.
- An edition of H. Grätz's Emendationes in Plerosque Sacræ Scripturæ V. T. Libros, 1892-94.
- A treatment of the chapters of philology and exegesis in Winter and Wünsche's collection of Hebrew literature, Die Jüdische Literatur. These contributions of Bacher have also been published separately under the respective titles: Die Jüdische Bibelexegese vom Anfange des Zehnten bis zum Ende des Fünfzehnten Jahrhunderts.
- Die Hebräische Sprachwissenschaft vom Zehnten bis zum Sechzehnten Jahrhundert, mit einem Einleitenden Abschnitt über die Masora, 1892.
- Die Anfänge der Hebräischen Grammatik, in Z. D. M. G., also published by Brockhaus, Leipsic, 1895. This is the first history of Hebrew grammar (Dotan 1977).
- Die Aelteste Terminologie der Jüdischen Schriftauslegung—ein Wörterbuch der Bibelexegetischen Kunstsprache der Tannaïten, I. C. Hinrich, Leipsic, 1899.

Bacher has also been the author of numerous criticisms and reviews in periodicals devoted, like his books, to Hebrew philology, history of Biblical exegesis, and of the Aggadah. The magazines, etc., in which his contributions have appeared are the following:

- M. E. Stern, "Kokbe Yiẓḥaḳ," 1865-68
- "Monatsschrift," 1869-92
- "Izraelit Közlöny," 1869-70
- Rahmer's "Israelitische Wochenschrift und Jüdische Literaturblätter," 1870-76
- I. Kobak's "Jeschurun," 1871
- I. Reich, "Beth-Lechem," Jahrbuch, 1873
- "Ha-Ḥabaẓelet," 1873; "Z. D. M. G." 1874-1902
- Berliner's "Magazin für die Geschichte und Literatur des Judenthums," 1880-94
- "Rev. Et. Juives," 1882-1902
- "Magyar Zsidó Szemle," 1884-1901
- W. R. Harper, "Hebraica," 1884-93
- Stade, "Zeitschrift" 1885-1901
- "Jew. Quart. Rev." 1890-1901
- Königsberger, "Monatsblätter," 1891
- Évkönyv, "Jahrbuch des Ungarisch-Israelitischen Literaturvereins," published in Hungarian, 1895–1901
- "Oẓar ha-Sefarim"
- "Gräber's Magazin für Hebrẓische Literatur," 1896
- "Zeit. f. Hebr. Bibl." 1896-1900
- "Deutsche Literaturzeitung," 1898-1901
- S. H. Horodeczky's "Ha-Goren"
- "Abhandlung über die Wissenschaft des Judenthums," 1898-1900
- "Ha-Eshkol," "Hebräisches Jahrbuch," 1898
- "Jahrbuch für Jüdische Gesch. und Literatur," 1899-1900
- "Theologische Literaturzeitung," 1900-1
- "Keleti Szemle" ("Revue Orientale," 1902)
- "The Expository Times," 1900.

Further contributions of Bacher appeared in the festival publications to the seventieth birthday of H. Graetz, 1887, and the eightieth birthday of Steinschneider, 1896; in the festival publication in honor of Daniel Chwolsohn, 1899; and in the memorial book published on the anniversary of Samuel David Luzzatto's birthday, Berlin, 1900, and in that published in memory of Prof. David Kaufmann, 1900. Bacher has also contributed the article Levita to the Allgemeine Encyklopädie of Ersch and Gruber, and the articles Sanhedrin and Synagoge to the last volume of Hastings and Selbie's Dictionary of the Bible.
