= Jacob Nahum Epstein =

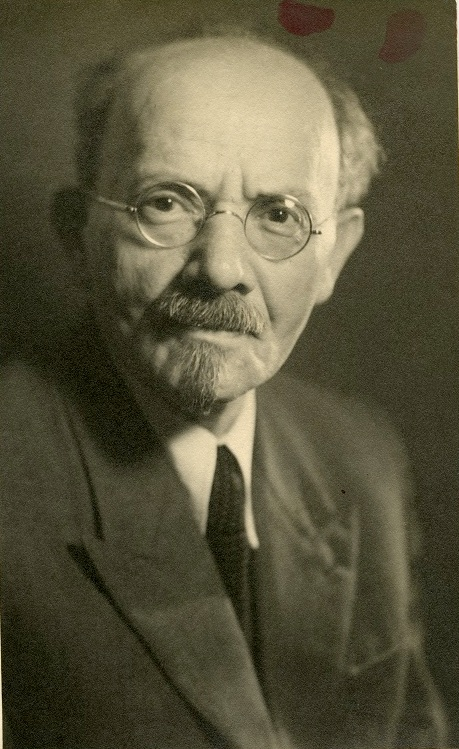

Jacob Nahum ha-Levi Epstein (1878–1952) was a talmudist and rabbinic scholar from Brest-Litovsk. He had an impact of the field of rabbinic literature. His colleagues referred to him, as the "father of exact Talmudic science."

== Education and career ==
He studied with his father at home and at the Mir yeshiva. After studying for his doctorate in Vienna and Bern, which he received in 1912, he published on geonic and Talmudic philology, and began studying the Mishnah in 1915. In 1923 Epstein accepted a position at the Hochschule für die Wissenschaft des Judentums in Berlin. Following that he joined the nascent Institute of Jewish Studies of the Hebrew University of Jerusalem. He was the dean from 1936 to 1938. The Jewish Theological Seminary of America bestowed on him an honorary degree in 1940.

He trained his students in an innovative approach to Talmudic studies, including Saul Lieberman, G. Alon, S. Abramson, M. Margaliot, and Ezra Zion Melamed. He studied, in addition to rabbinical literature, the Elephantine papyri, and his Mavo le-Nusaḥ ha-Mishnah (2 vols., 1948) is considered to be one of the most authoritative studies of the Mishnah's original text. Melamed, his student, published two of his works posthumously, Mevo'ot le-Sifrut ha-Tanna'im (1957) and Mevo'ot le-Sifrut ha-Amora'im (1962). His works studied the Mishnah and the Tosefta, but he was unable to realize his dream of publishing a full critical edition of the Mishnah. He also drew upon lost midrashim from the Cairo Geniza. He compiled a catalog of the "European Geniza" materials.

Among his students was Samuel Miklos Stern, whom he taught Aramaic.
