= Simon Bacher =

Simon Bacher (February 1, 1823, Liptovský Mikuláš – November 9, 1891, Budapest), born Shimon ben Yitzḥak Bacharach (Hebrew: שִׁמְעוֹן בֵּן יִצְחַק בַּכָרָךְ), was a Hungarian Jewish Hebrew poet.

== Biography ==
Simon Bacher came of a family of scholars, and counted as one of his ancestors the well-known Moravian-German rabbi Jair Ḥayyim Bacharach. He studied Talmud in his native city, in Mikulov under Menahem Nahum Trebitsch, and in Eisenstadt and Bonyhád under Moses Perles. During this period Bacher was much influenced by the new movement of the Haskalah, and he also studied the secular sciences and literature.

When nineteen years old Bacher returned to Liptovský Mikuláš, where, despite the business in which he was engaged, he continued his studies enthusiastically. After many struggles Bacher in 1874 went to Budapest, where two years later he was appointed treasurer of the Jewish community. This office he held until he died.

== Work ==
When a boy of 7, Bacher had translated German poems into Hebrew. Thus Schiller's Song of the Bell first came to be known to the scholars in Bonyhád, who were wholly engrossed with their Talmudic studies. The events of his fatherland and of the Jewish community, festival days and days of mourning, jubilees and funerals, equally inspired his song. He celebrated scholars, preachers, statesmen; orators, singers, philanthropists, and writers; and Jewish legends and history also provided subjects for his poems, in which were mingled reflections and expressions of sentiment, myths, and historical events.

In addition to short scientific and miscellaneous contributions to magazines—the former consisting of linguistic studies on the Talmud and essays in archeology—Bacher wrote some short poems in German. But his place in Jewish literature was won chiefly by his Hebrew poetry. He also translated German, French, and Hungarian poems into Hebrew. The translations are classic in form, and reproduce the spirit of the original.

Bacher contributed to many Jewish magazines, and wrote also a number of occasional poems published separately. Among his longer works are the following:

- Translations of Ludwig Philippson's tragedy Jojachin, Vienna, 1860, and of Lessing's Nathan the Wise, Vienna, 1866;
- Zemirot ha-'Areẓ (Hymns of the Land), Budapest, 1868, and a collection of Hungarian poems:
- Muẓẓal Meësh (Saved from the Fire), Budapest, 1879, a collection of various original poems;
- Melek Ebyon (The Poor King), Budapest, 1881, a collection of romantic Biblical poems;
- Michtame Gleichenberg (Budapest, 1887), "makamas" in the manner of Ludwig August von Frankl.

After Bacher's death his son Wilhelm Bacher published, under the title Sha'ar Shim'on (Vienna, 1894), a selection of Hebrew poems, culled from Bacher's printed works and from unpublished manuscripts, 1894, in three parts: the first of these contains his original poems; the second, translations; and the third, Nathan der Weise. The work is prefaced with a biography of Bacher and a chronological list of his works.

== Sources ==
- Wilhelm Bacher, in the introduction to his father's Sha'ar Shim'on, 1894
