= Leopold Löw =

Hungarian rabbi (1811-1875)

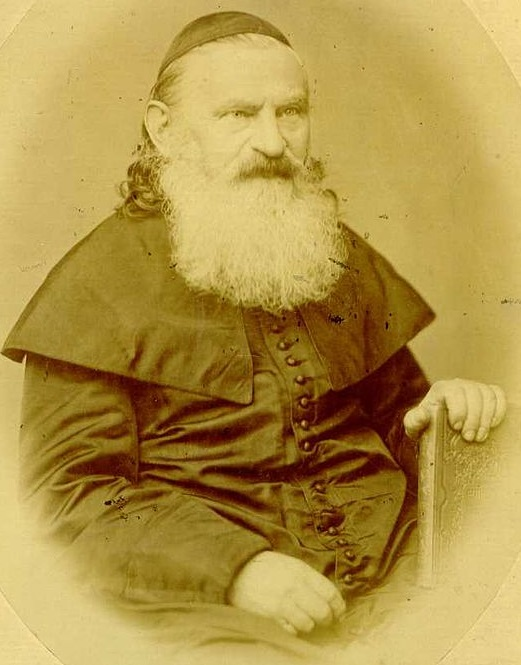
Leopold Löw

Judah Leib "Leopold" Löw (Hebrew: יהודה לייב לעף, Hungarian: Lőw Lipót; 22 May 1811 – 13 October 1875) was a Hungarian rabbi, regarded as the most important figure of Neolog Judaism.

== Biography ==
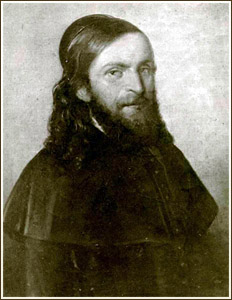
Portrait of L. Löw

Löw was born to the only Jewish family in the village Černá Hora, Moravia, then part of the Austria. His Jewish name, as appears in all his rabbinical correspondence, was Judah Leib. On his father's side, he was descended from the Maharal of Prague, and on his mother's from Menachem Mendel Krochmal. He received his preliminary education at the yeshivot of Třebíč, Kolín, Lipník nad Bečvou and Eisenstadt (1824 – 35), and then studied philology, pedagogics, and Christian theology at the Lyceum of Bratislava and at the universities of Pest and Vienna (1835 – 41). After having been a teacher at Prostějov, he succeeded to the rabbinate of Nagykanizsa (10 September 1841).

Löw early in his career acquired a knowledge of Hungarian, and was the first to introduce it into the synagogue service, his first sermon in that language being printed in 1845. In 1844 he began his literary activity on behalf of the emancipation of the Hungarian Jews, taking the lead in that struggle until its object was attained (1867). The periodical Ben Chananja, edited by him from 1858 to 1867, was an especially influential factor in this movement.

In 1846 Löw had been called to Pápa, where he encountered many difficulties. After the revolution he was denounced by his enemies, and was arrested, but was pardoned by General Julius Jacob von Haynau on 14 December 1849 and liberated after two months' imprisonment. In consequence of this persecution he accepted a call to Szeged, where he was installed on 10 December 1850. He refused subsequent calls to Lemberg, Brno, and Bucharest, as well as to the Hochschule für die Wissenschaft des Judenthums at Berlin.

He died at Szeged, Austria-Hungary.

== Influence on Hungarian Reform ==
Löw brought his thorough knowledge of history, theology, and esthetics to bear upon the reform of the ritual in agreement with modern views. He was the foremost preacher of Hungary, especially in the vernacular, and was invited to participate in nearly all the patriotic celebrations and synagogal dedications. His Hungarian sermons (1870) formed the first Jewish collection of the kind issued in that language. Löw combined the careful, logical arrangement of the Christian sermon with a clever analysis of complicated haggadic sentences. His studies, beginning with the history of the Halakhah, subsequently included the entire Jewish archeology of post-Talmudic time. He endeavored to determine the development of Jewish life and law as it appears in the halakhic literature, and to disprove, in the interest of Judaism, the view that Judaism remained stationary in its manners and customs down to the beginning of the German Reformation. His most important archaeological studies and responsa were written for the purpose of proving the development of various institutions and of showing the influence, in many cases, of foreign customs.

Löw was a leading authority both from a scientific point of view and in questions of practical theology. The absolute (1850 – 66) as well as the constitutional government (1867) of Austria and especially that of Hungary were guided by the replies he gave to their questions in matters referring to the organization of the Jewish ritual and schools. Jewish education throughout Hungary owed much to him. Down to his death he was the leader of the progressive Hungarian Jews, especially after the General Congress — which was convened against his advice and in which he did not take part — had resulted in a schism among the Jews of Hungary instead of the union that had been anticipated.

== Works ==
Aside from his works on the Halakhah, Löw left only one other larger work, Ha-Mafteaḥ (1855), a history (in German) of exegesis among the Jews: this remained authoritative into the twentieth century. After the emancipation, when he gave up the editorship of Ben Chananja, he devoted himself to larger archeological monographs, of which the following were published: Die Graphischen Requisiten (1870 – 71) and Die Lebensalter in der jüdischen Literatur (1875). Fragments of a third volume, Der Synagogale Ritus, were published posthumously (1884). His smaller works have appeared in five volumes (Szeged, 1889 – 1900), the last of which contains a complete bibliography of his works.

== Sons ==
- Immanuel Löw, a rabbi and Orientalist (born at Szeged, Hungary, 20 January 1854; died July 19, 1944, in Budapest), was educated at his native town and at Berlin, where he studied at the Lehranstalt für die Wissenschaft des Judenthums and at the university, graduating as rabbi and as Ph.D. in 1878. The same year he became rabbi in Szeged. Among his books (which include biographies) may be mentioned: "Aramäische Pflanzennamen," Vienna, 1881; "A szegedi zsidók," Szeged, 1885; "A szegedi chevra," ib. 1887; "Alkalmi beszédek," ib. 1891; "Az ezredév: nyolc beszéd," ib. 1896; "Löw Immánuel beszédei," ib. 1900; "Imádságok," 3d ed. ib. 1903; "Vörösmarty Mihály," ib. 1900; "Szilágyi Dezsö," ib. 1901; "Tisza Kálmán," ib. 1902; "Kossuth Lajos," ib. 1902; "Templomszentelő," ib. 1903; "Deák Ferenc," ib. 1903. He has furthermore contributed articles on Syriac lexicography to various volumes of the Zeitschrift der Deutschen Morgenländischen Gesellschaft, and has edited the following works: "Schwab Löw, Emlékeztetés a vallásban nyert oktatásra," 5th ed. Szeged, 1887; "Löw Lipót, Bibliai Történet," 10th ed. Budapest, 1902; "Leopold Löw: Gesammelte Schriften," i.-v., Szeged, 1889–1900.
- Samuel (born Pápa, September 1846), studied at Szeged and Vienna [M.D. 1871]), was a physician. In 1873 he went to Budapest, where three years later he founded the Pester Medizinisch-Chirurgische Presse. In this periodical, of which he was (1904) the editor-in-chief, most of his scientific articles appeared.
- Theodor (born Pápa, 14 November 1848), was a lawyer in Budapest. The following were his chief works: "Iromány Példák az uj magyar csődeljáráshoz" (Budapest, 1882), on the new Hungarian bankruptcy proceedings, and "A Magyar Büntető Törvénykönyv a bűntettekről és vétségekről" (ib. 1884), on the Hungarian criminal and civil codes.
- Tobias (Nagykanizsa, 5 June 1844 – Budapest, 7 June 1880) served as Acting Attorney-General until his death. In 1874 he founded the Magyar Igazságügy, a legal periodical in the interests of Hungarian jurisprudence and legislation. Löw took an active part in the preparation of the Hungarian penal code, for which he edited the material (1880).
- William, was a lawyer and editor in New York City. He translated Imre Madach's The Tragedy of Man and also wrote a biography of his father (available in Google ebookstore), published in 1912 celebrating the centenary of Leopold Loew's birth. His daughter Rosalie Loew Whitney (1873 – 1939) was a lawyer and judge in New York.
