= Szeged Synagogue =

Neolog synagogue in Szeged, Hungary

- Hungarian: Szegedi zsinagóga
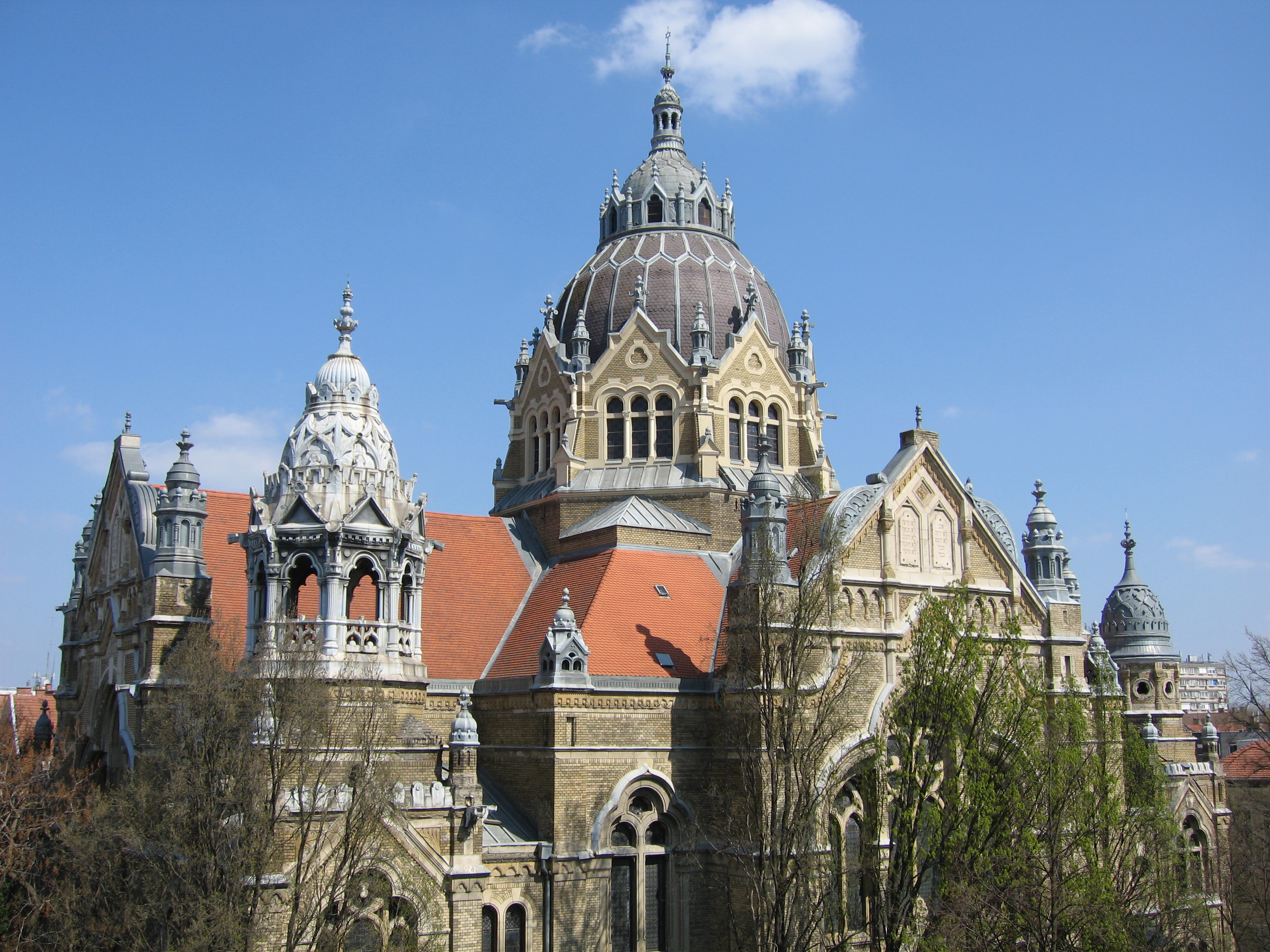
- The synagogue in 2011

- Location of the synagogue in Hungary

Religion
- Affiliation: Neolog Judaism
- Rite: Nusach Ashkenaz
- Ecclesiastical or organisational status: Synagogue
- Status: Active

Location
- Location: Josika ut. 10, Szeged, Csongrád-Csanád
- Country: Hungary
- Coordinates: 46°15′14″N 20°08′34″E

Architecture
- Architect: Lipót Baumhorn
- Type: Synagogue architecture
- Style: Art Nouveau; Historicist
- Established: 1803 (as a congregation)
- Groundbreaking: 1900
- Completed: 1902

Specifications
- Capacity: 1,300 seats
- Length: 48 m (157 ft)
- Width: 35 m (115 ft)
- Height (max): 49 m (161 ft)
- Dome: Four (maybe more)
- Dome height (inner): 32 m (105 ft)
- Materials: Brick

Website
- zsinagoga.szeged.hu/en

The Szeged Synagogue (Hungarian: Szegedi zsinagóga), also called the Great Synagogue and the New Synagogue, is a Neolog Jewish congregation and synagogue, located at Josika ut. 10, in Szeged, in the county of Csongrád-Csanád, Hungary.

A tourist attraction for the town, in addition to occasional religious use, as of 2024 the synagogue also served as an events center and concert hall.

== Architecture ==
Designed by Lipót Baumhorn, after winning an 1897 design competition, the synagogue was completed in 1902 and is considered to contain the finest examples of the unique fin de siècle Hungarian blending of Art Nouveau| and Historicist styles, sometimes known as Magyar style, or Sezession style.

The interior of the synagogue building, with its 48.5 meters (159 feet) tall domed ceiling, draws on multiple historical styles to produce a blend of Art Nouveau and Moorish Revival styles. The rib-like wall above the organ has Gothic Revival origins, while the columns supporting the galleries are Roman. The interior of the great dome, and all of the building's stained glass, are the work of the artist Miksa Róth.

The design of the Torah Ark alludes to the Holy of Holies in the Temple of Solomon by using sittimwood from the banks of Nile, the wood called for in the building of the Temple of Solomon in 1 Kings. The hinges are in the shape of the Hyssop plant, a plant used in the ancient Temple service.

The Szeged Synagogue is the second largest in Hungary after the Dohány Street Synagogue in Budapest, and the fourth largest in the world.

== Gallery ==
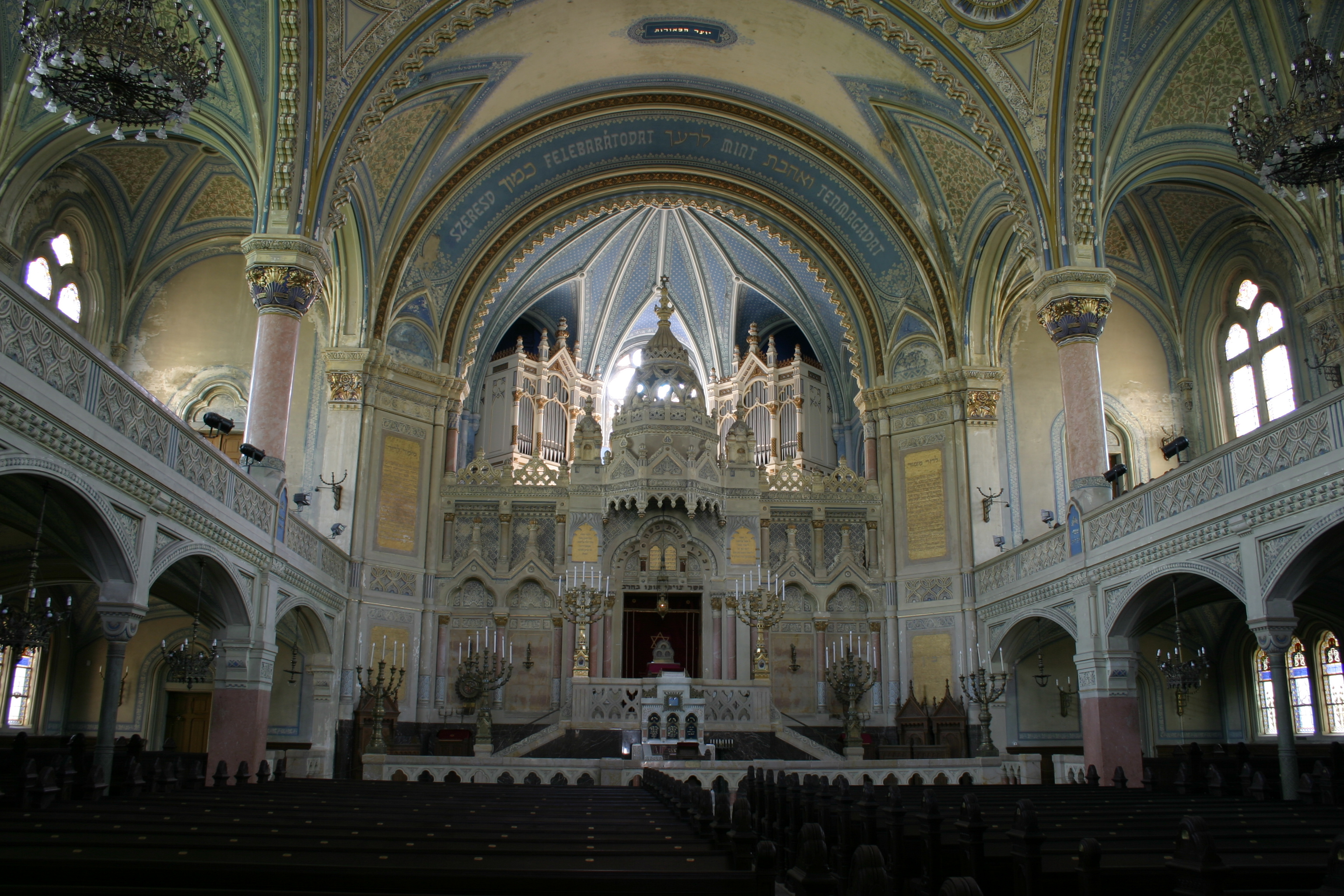
Interior of the synagogue

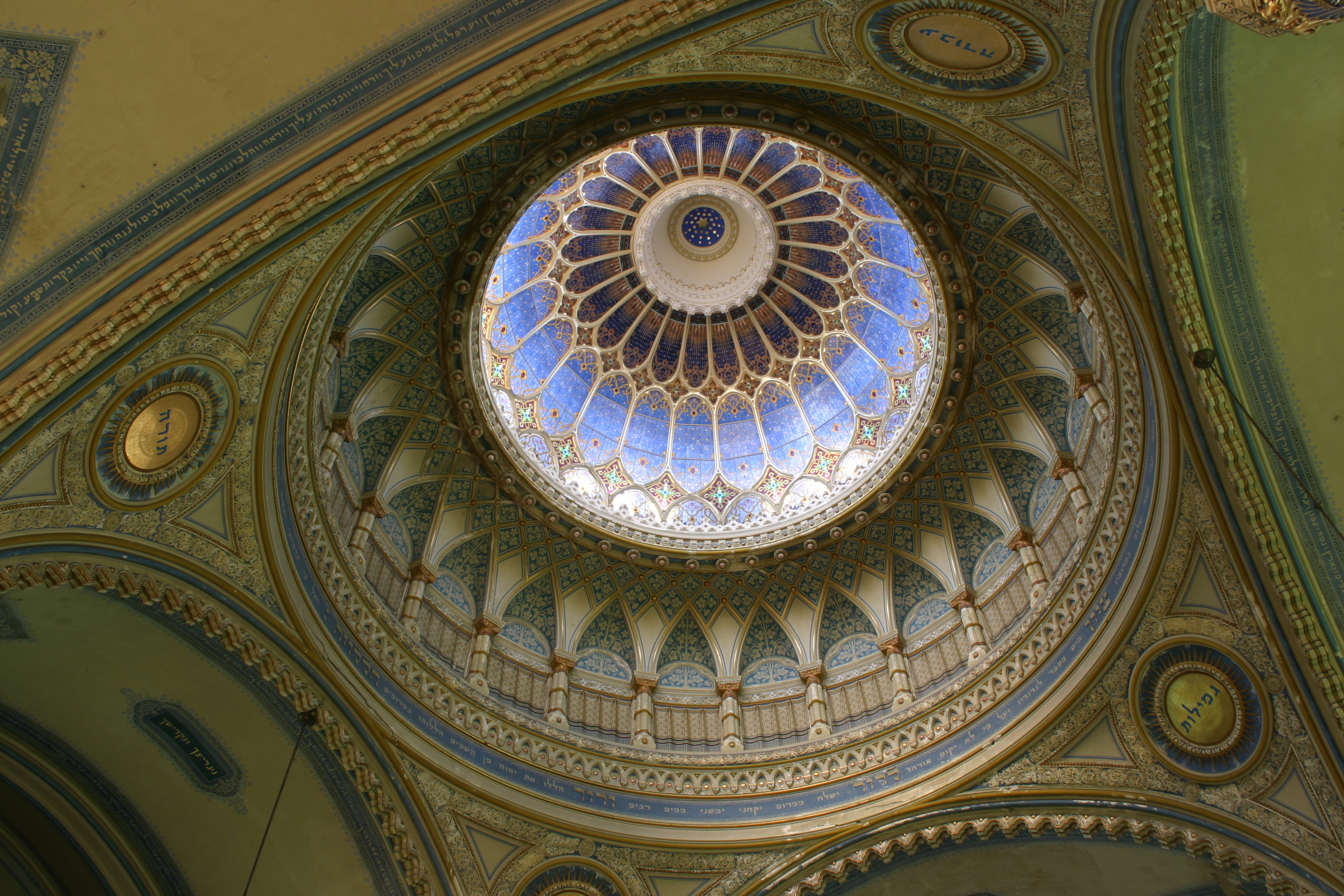
Dome from inside the synagogue

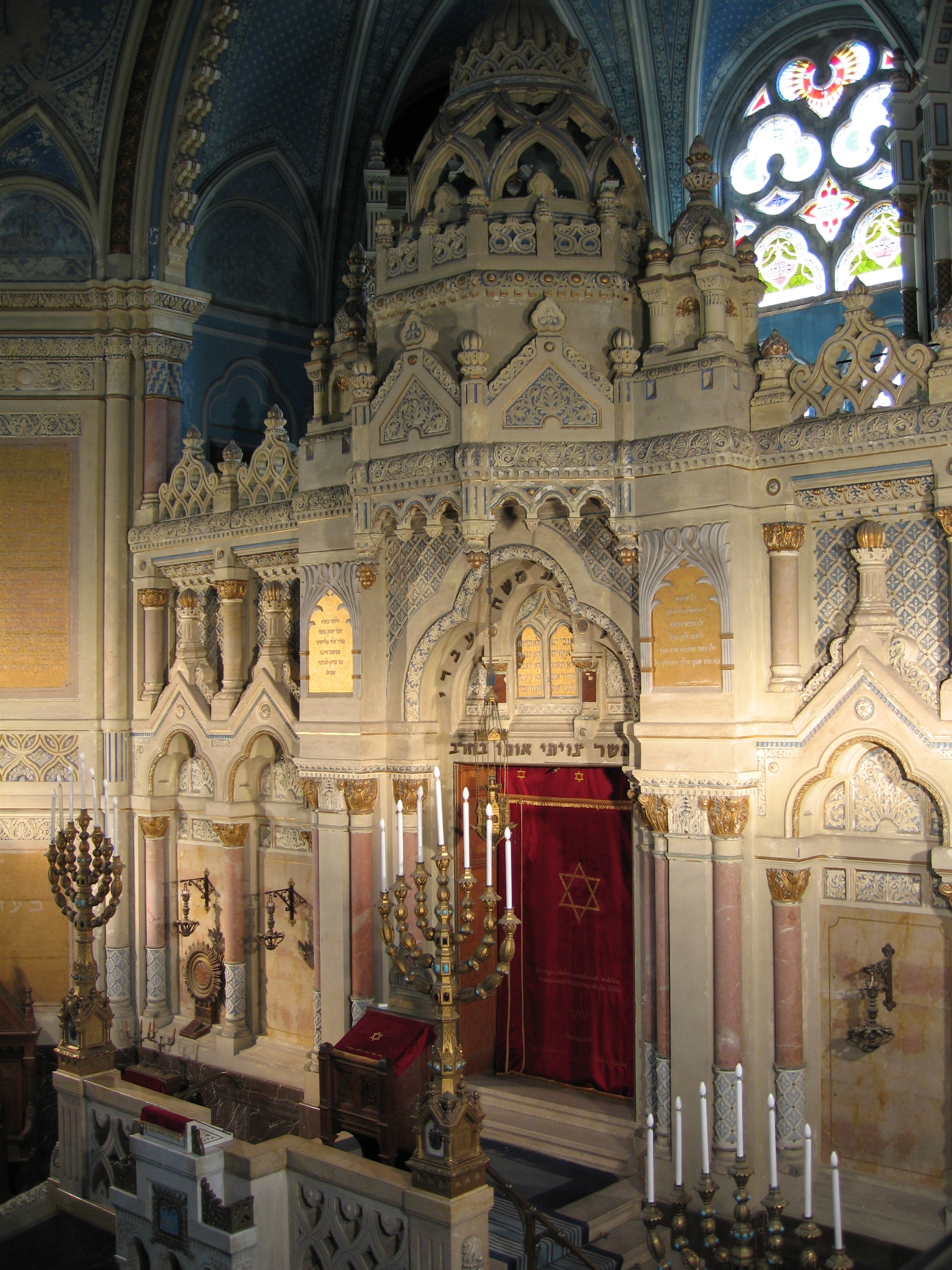
The Torah Ark (or Tebah) of the synagogue

== See also ==
- History of the Jews in Hungary
- List of synagogues in Hungary
