= Moses Löb Bloch =

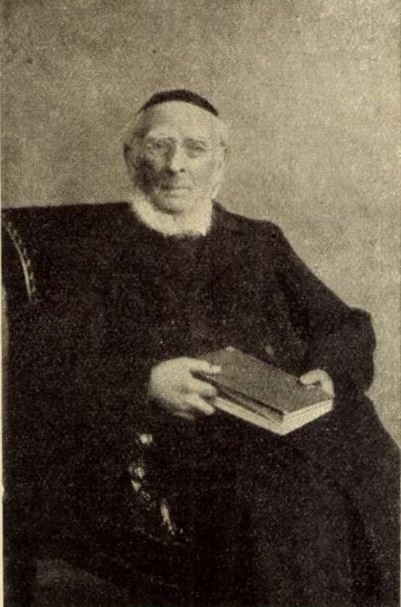

Personal life
- Born: 15 February 1815 Ronsperg, Bohemia
- Died: 6 August 1909 (aged 94) Nagymaros, Hungary
- Spouse: Anna Weishut
- Parents: Elia Bloch (father); Ester Löw (mother)

Religious life
- Religion: Judaism
- Position: Rector of Rabbinical Seminary of Budapest

Moses Löb Bloch (15 February 1815 – 6 August 1909) was a Hungarian rabbi and rector at the Rabbinical Seminary of Budapest.

== Life ==
After studying under Philipp Kohner, a pupil of Ezekiel Landau, district rabbi of Pilsen, Bloch was entrusted to the care of his uncle, Wolf Löw, author of the Sha'are Torah. Löw, who guided the boy's studies for seven years (1827–34) in his house at Gross-Tapolcsány (Hungary), is often quoted in his nephew's lectures.

On graduating from the gymnasium at Pilsen, he went in 1840 to the University of Prague, and was appointed a rabbi at Wotitz in 1841, when he married Anna Weishut (died 1886). He was called as rabbi to Hermanmiestec, Bohemia, in 1852, and to Leipnik, Moravia, in 1856, where he remained until October 1877. In that year he was called as professor and rector to the Rabbinical Seminary at Budapest.

== Works ==
Bloch published the following works: (1) "Sha'are Torat ha-Tekanot" ("Die Institutionen des Judenthums nach der in den Quellen Angegebenen Geschichtlichen Reihenfolge Geordnet und Entwickelt"), 4 vols., Vienna and Cracow, 1879–1902, 3 vols., Budapest, 1902; (2) 11 Das Mosaisch-Talmudische Polizeirecht" (special print from the "Annual Report" of the Rabbinical Seminary), Budapest, 1879; (3) "Die Ethik in der Halacha" (also in Hungarian; appeared in the "Annual Report" of the Seminary for 1885), Leipsic, 1886; (4) "Das Mosaisch-Talmudische Erbrecht" (in the "Annual Report" for 1889); (5) "Sefer Sha'are Teshubot Maharam" ("Die Bisher Unedirten Responsa des R. Meïr von Rothenburg"), Berlin, 1891 ("Mekiẓe Nirdamim" publications); (6) "Der Vertrag nach Mosaisch-Talmudischem Rechte" (from the "Annual Report" for 1893), Budapest, 1893; (7) "Das Mosaisch-Talmudische Besitzrecht" (from the "Annual Report" for 1897).

The works published in the reports of the Landes-Rabbinerschule (National Rabbinical School) have all appeared also in the Hungarian language.

== Family ==
He was born a Czech-Jewish family. Among his ancestors were Isaac, rabbi at Cracow; the grandson of the latter, Phinehas Selig, author of the "'Aṭeret Paz"; and the latter's son, Aryeh Löw, a well-known Talmudist, who was the father of Eleazar Löw, the author of "Shemen Roḳeaḥ." He later immigrated to Hungary.
