= Budapest University of Jewish Studies =

University in Budapest, Hungary

Coordinates: 47.49347°N 19.07°E

The logo of Budapest University of Jewish Studies. The logo is basically a 3-d Star of David, a long-time symbol of Judaism.

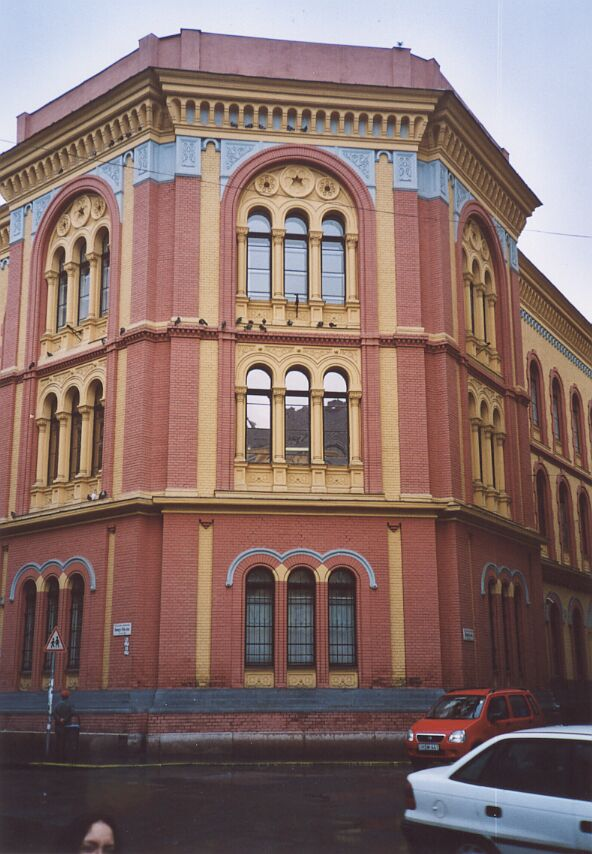
The Budapest University of Jewish Studies, formerly the Rabbinical Seminary.

The Budapest University of Jewish Studies (Hungarian: Országos Rabbiképző – Zsidó Egyetem, or Országos Rabbiképző Intézet / Jewish Theological Seminary – University of Jewish Studies / German: Landesrabbinerschule in Budapest) is a university in Budapest, Hungary. It was opened in 1877, a few decades after the first European rabbinical seminaries had been built in Padua, Metz, Paris and Breslau. Still, it remains the oldest existing institution in the world where rabbis are graduated.

== History ==
=== 19th century ===
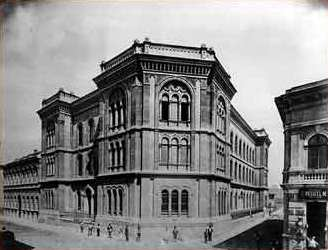
The Seminary building in 1902.

The growing liberal segment in Hungarian Jewish society, known as Neologs, were interested in secularly-educated clergy and their leaders strove to have a modern seminary. Orthodox Hungarian rabbis were very much against a rabbinical seminary. In order to prevent its establishment in Budapest, they sent a delegation to Emperor Francis Joseph of Austria in Vienna. However, the Emperor was favorable to the rabbinical school and even financed its construction, giving back to the Hungarian Jews the money they had had to pay 30 years before as a war tax after the Hungarian Revolution of 1848. On October 4, 1877, the seminary was opened in József körút. Its first principal was Moses Löb Bloch, who was assisted by David Kaufmann and Wilhelm Bacher.

=== Second World War ===
On March 19, 1944 German troops marched into Budapest (Operation Margarethe). The next day, the rabbinical seminary was confiscated by the Schutzstaffel (SS) and turned into a prison. From there, Adolf Eichmann organized the deportation of thousands of Hungarian Jews and some political detainees into the concentration camps, mainly to Auschwitz.

Just in time before the German invasion, the most valuable manuscripts had been brought into an underground safe. Still, an important part of the library was seized by the Nazis. 3000 books were dispatched to Prague. Only in the 1980s were the books discovered in the cellar of the Jewish Museum of Prague, and some of them were brought back to Budapest in 1989. The library remains a source of pride for the university. It is considered one of the most important collections of Jewish theological literature outside Israel.

=== After the war, Communist era ===
Immediately after the defeat of the Nazis, the Rabbinical seminary resumed its activity and was reopened two months before the surrender of Germany. However, the number of students was not sufficient for keeping the gymnasium department. Instead, a pedagogical college was arranged for religion and Hebrew teachers to be graduated.

Despite the anti-religious policy of the Communist government, the rabbinical seminary in Budapest remained alive. It was the only one of its kind in Eastern Europe, but strongly dependent on national authorities. Religious life was regulated by the Ministry of Religion which was responsible for filling vacant rabbinical posts in Hungary.

Being the only place of its kind in the Eastern bloc, the Budapest seminary had a special mission. Students came from all countries of Eastern Europe, from the Soviet Union and even from Israel, to be graduated as a rabbi or cantor. They lived in small, simply furnished boarding rooms, sometimes along with their families.

From 1950 until his death in 1985, Sándor Scheiber was director of the seminary. He edited important publications on Jewish studies from the Middle Ages to the 20th century.

=== After 1989 ===
After the end of communism, thanks to donations from abroad, the seminary building was renovated, the library modernized and some of the valuable old books were restored.

== Languages of instruction ==
Although at the time of the founding of the seminary, religious subjects were taught mostly in German, which was understandable to students from different regions, serious efforts were immediately made to transition most of the teaching into Hungarian. Secular subjects (mathematics, physics, history) were taught in Hungarian from the very beginning, since Jewish intellectuals of Hungary had a good command of the Hungarian language. A number of well-known professors invited to the seminary (in particular, Moses Bloch) signed contracts containing the condition to master the Hungarian language within a few years and begin teaching subjects in it.

During the communist period, almost all subjects were taught in Hungarian; for students from other socialist countries, including from the USSR, other languages could be used in the first courses, in particular Russian, German and English, but students had to learn Hungarian and then take courses in it.

Modern Hebrew was not used or studied until the end of the Communist era, in order to avoid accusations of Zionist propaganda. When reading religious texts in Hebrew, the local Ashkenazi pronunciation was used.

Currently, there is a language department and Modern Hebrew is required in all courses of study. Several other languages are taught as well, including Biblical Hebrew, Yiddish, Ladino, ancient Greek, and English. Courses are taught mostly in Hungarian and occasionally in English.

== Original course of studies ==
The institute was under the supervision of the ministry of religion, which appointed the teachers upon nomination by the council (consisting of twelve clerical and twelve lay members), of which M. Schweiger was president and Dr. J. Simon secretary, ever since 1877. The course of study extended over ten years and was divided into two equal periods; one being devoted to the lower department, the other to the upper. The former corresponded to an "Obergymnasium"; and the requirement for admission was the possession of a diploma from an "Untergymnasium", or the passing of an entrance examination covering a certain amount of Hebrew and Talmudics in addition to secular studies. The diplomas from this department were recognized by the state, and commanded admittance into any department of the universities or schools of technology. After the completion of the courses offered by the upper department, including attendance under the faculty of philosophy at the university, a year of probation followed. This was concluded in February by an oral examination after the candidate had presented three written theses on Biblical, rabbinic-Talmudic, and historical or religious-philosophical subjects respectively. At graduation, he received a rabbinical diploma, which was recognized by the state. To supplement the regular course of training there were students' societies in both departments.

== Organization ==
Currently, the institution is an accredited institution of higher education in Hungary, offering degrees in Jewish Studies on the BA, MA and PhD levels. The catalogue of the library of the institute contains over 110,000 items, including manuscripts, printed books, journals, etc., which are accessible to all in the reading-room.
