= Lipót Baumhorn =

Hungarian architect (1860–1932)

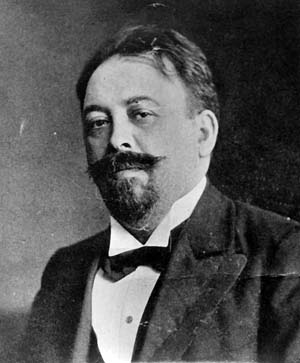
- Born: Baumhorn Lipót; 28 December 1860; Kisbér, Kingdom of Hungary
- Died: 8 July 1932 (aged 71); Kisbér, Kingdom of Hungary
- Occupation: Architect
- Practice: synagogues and other public buildings

Lipót Baumhorn (Hungarian: Baumhorn Lipót, German: Leopold Baumhorn, 28 December 1860 – 8 July 1932) was a Hungarian architect of Jewish heritage, the most influential Hungarian synagogue architect in the first half of the 20th century. He drew blueprints for about 20 synagogues in the Kingdom of Hungary.

== Career ==
He graduated from the main real school in Győr, the technical university in Vienna under Freiherr von Ferstel, König and Weyr. Then he came to Budapest and worked for 12 years in the office of architects Ödön Lechner and Gyula Pártos. In 1893 and 1899. He traveled to Italy, 1904. to Central Europe for architectural studies. His first independent work was the Moorish-style synagogue in Esztergom, built in 1888, which established his reputation. Since then, B. built 22 synagogues in Hungary, the most significant of which is Szeged (1903), which was one of the largest in the old Austro-Hungarian monarchy (with 740 men's and 600 women's seats), significant new rural, Nagybecskerek, Fiume, Brassó, Temesvár, Szolnok, Cegléd, Eger, Losonc, Liptószentmiklós, Budapest: Aréna-út, Páva utca, Csáky utca synagogues. Other buildings include: The King of Győr. table (1890), the glass factories of Salgótarján (1893), the pavilion of the paper and reproduction industry of the millennial exhibition (1896), the headquarters of the Temesvár Valley Water Regulatory Company, the Temesvár higher girls' school, the headquarters of the Szeged-Csongrád Savings Bank, (1903), the Újvidék Savings Bank the Baja Savings Bank, the Temesvár Lloyd and the Stock Exchange Palace (1910–12).

== Buildings ==
=== Secular buildings ===
- Temesvár-Béga Palace (Timișoara)
- Junior High School (Timișoara, 1902–1904) (with Jakab Klein)
- Szeged-Csongrád Savings Bank (Szeged, Széchenyi tér 7. – Takarékpénztár u. 7. 1902–1903)
- Iron house (Szeged, Horváth Mihály u. 9. – Takarékpénztár u. 8., 1912–1913)
- Wagner Palace (Szeged, Kölcsey u. 4. – Kárász u. 14., 1904–1905)
- Savings Bank Palace (Újvidék (Novi Sad), 1904–1905)
- Menrat's Palace (Újvidék (Novi Sad), 1908)
- Tomin's Palace (Újvidék (Novi Sad), 1909)
- Csata Street School (Budapest, 13th district, Csata u. 20., 1909–1911)
- Wagner Palace (Szeged, Feketesas u. 28., 1910–1911)
- Forbát House (Szeged, Dugonics tér 11. – Lajos Tisza 60., 1911–1912)
- Lloyd's Palace (Timișoara, 1912)
- Metal Trading Company Limited Office Building (Budapest, 13th district, Balzac u. 5., 1922)

=== Headquarters of the Jewish Community ===
- Headquarters of the Jewish Community of Szeged (Gutenberg u. 20 - Jósika 12., 1901–1903, Szeged)

=== Synagogues ===
Lipót Baumhorn designed many synagogues. The following is a detailed list:

| No. | Location | Name | Built | Destroyed | Remarks | Picture |
|---|---|---|---|---|---|---|
| 1st | Esztergom, Hungary | Esztergom Synagogue | 1888 | stand | It is used for cultural purposes. | |
| 2nd | Rijeka, Croatia | Rijeka Synagogue | 1895 | 1944 | It was destroyed by Nazis. | |
| 3rd | Zrenjanin, Serbia | Zrenjanin Synagogue | 1896 | 1941 | It was demolished by the German occupiers during World War II, only its organ escaped. | |
| 4th | Timișoara, Romania | Fabric Synagogue | 1897–1899 | stand | It is in a dilapidated state, threatened with collapse. | |
| 5th | Szolnok, Hungary | Szolnok Synagogue | 1898 | stand | Recently renovated. The Szolnok Gallery operates in the building. | |
| 6th | Brașov, Romania | Brașov Synagogue | 1899–1901 | stand | Recently renovated. In use. | |
| 7th | Szeged, Hungary | Szeged New Synagogue | 1900–1902 | stand | It is the second largest synagogue in Hungary and the fourth largest in the world. Recently renovated. In use. | |
| 8th | Cegléd, Hungary | Cegléd Synagogue | 1902 | stand | It functions as a sports hall. | |
| 9th | Novi Sad, Serbia | Novi Sad Synagogue | 1905–1909 | stand | It is used for many cultural concerts and events. | |
| 10th | Satu Mare, Romania | Satmar Synagogue | 1906–1909 | after 1945 | It was demolished at an unknown time after World War II. | |
| 11th | Murska Sobota, Slovenia | Murska Sobota Synagogue | 1908 | 1954 | It was demolished in 1954. | |
| 12th | Budapest, Hungary | Arena Synagogue | 1908–1909 | stand | The building is now used by the Budapest Honved Fencing Hall | |
| 13th | Nitra, Slovakia | Nitra Synagogue | 1908–1911 | stand | Renovated from 2003, it is also available to the public as a museum of Jewish culture and a venue for various cultural events. | |
| 14th | Eger, Hungary | Eger Synagogue | 1911–1913 | 1967 | It was blown up, citing its exaggerated and degrading size of the settlement. | |
| 15th | Makó, Hungary | Makó Neological Synagogue | 1914 | 1965 | After the destruction of Makó Jewry in World War II, the synagogue lost its former role. In the 1950s and 1960s, several ideas were born for recycling, but they were eventually dismantled. | |
| 16th | Nyíregyháza, Hungary | Nyíregyháza New Synagogue | 1918–1923 | stand | In use. | |
| 17th | Budapest, Hungary | Páva Street Synagogue | 1923–1924 | stand | Recently renovated. In use. | |
| 18th | Lučenec, Slovakia | Lučenec Synagogue | 1924–1925 | stand | Recently renovated. It is used for cultural purposes. | |
| 19th | Gyöngyös, Hungary | Gyöngyös Synagogue | 1929–1930 | stand | Recently renovated. It is used for cultural purposes. | |

== Expansions ==
- Draft of the Lipótváros Synagogue (1899)
- Expansion of the Pécs Synagogue (1905)
- Reconstruction of the Kaposvár Synagogue (1905–1906)
- Reconstruction of the Synagogue of Liptovský Mikuláš (1906)
- Reconstruction and minor transformation of the Szeged Old Synagogue (1906)
- Expansion of the Újpest Synagogue (1909)
- Redesigning the damaged dome of Kecskemét synagogue with his finger (1910)
- Transformation of Kass Vígadó into a hotel (Szeged, Dózsa u. 1. – Stefánia 8. – Arany János u. 2–4. 1916)
- Extension of the Csáky Street Synagogue (1925–1927)
- Reconstruction of the Nagykanizsa Synagogue (1928)
- Plans for the New Synagogue of Žilina (1920s). He did not win the tender.
- Expansion of the Bethlen Space Synagogue (1931–1932)
