= Makó Neological Synagogue =

Former Neolog synagogue in Makó, Hungary

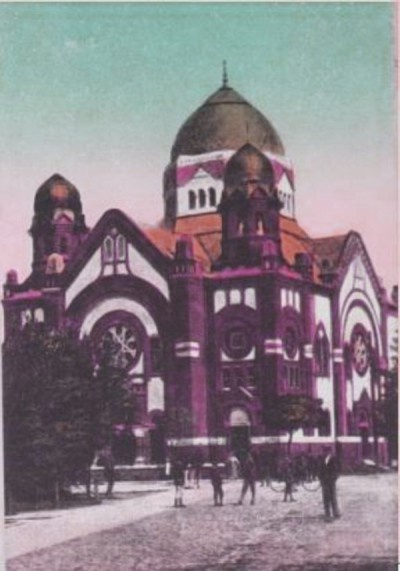
- A postcard of the former synagogue in c. 1914

- Location of the demolished synagogue in Hungary

Religion
- Affiliation: Neolog Judaism (former)
- Rite: Nusach Ashkenaz
- Ecclesiastical or organizational status: Synagogue (1914–c. 1939)
- Status: Demolished

Location
- Location: Eötvös Street, Makó, Csongrád-Csanád
- Country: Hungary
- Interactive map of Makó Neological Synagogue
- Coordinates: 46°13′01″N 20°28′33″E

Architecture
- Architect: Lipót Baumhorn
- Type: Synagogue architecture
- Style: Moorish Revival
- Established: c. 1750 (as a congregation)
- Completed: 1914
- Demolished: 1965

Specifications
- Dome: Three (maybe more)
- Materials: Brick

The Makó Neological Synagogue is a former Neolog Jewish congregation and large synagogue, that was located in the town of Makó, in the county of Csongrád-Csanád, Hungary. Completed in 1914, the synagogue was demolished in 1965.

== History ==
At the end of the 19th century, Mako's prominent and socially Neologous Jews decided to build a new synagogue. The new synagogue was built perpendicular to Eötvös Street, according to the plans of Lipót Baumhorn, inaugurated in 1914. Above the square of the central building, the dome on the octagonal hill, the eastern wing of the octagonal lock and the two chapel-like staircases surrounding it, and its semicircular twin-windowed windows, resembled Baumhorn's Eger Synagogue, also since demolished.

Following the destruction of the Mako Jewry during World War II, the synagogue was no longer used for its purpose. In the 1950s and 1960s, several ideas for renovating the synagogue were proposed. Eventually, the National Israeli Religious Community sold the building to the Kossuth Production Cooperative in 1965 for Ft500,000, without consulting the Jews living in the city. The building was subsequently demolished. The city police station is now located in a building on the site of the former synagogue.

== See also ==
- History of the Jews in Hungary
- List of synagogues in Hungary
