= Szolnok Synagogue =

Former synagogue, now art gallery, in Szolnok, Hungary

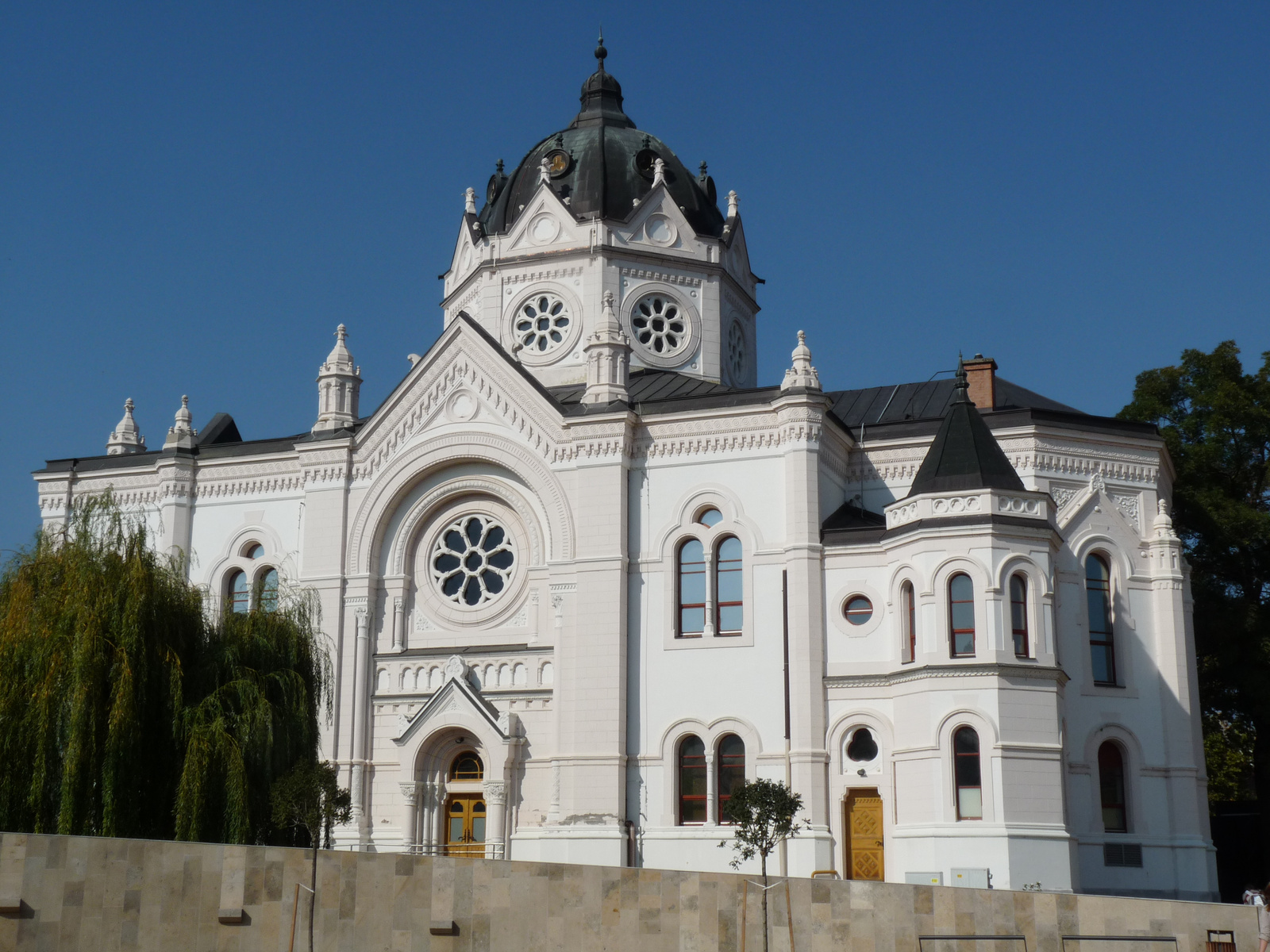
- The former synagogue in 2011

- Location of the former synagogue in Hungary

Religion
- Affiliation: Neolog Judaism (former)
- Rite: Nusach Ashkenaz
- Ecclesiastical or organisational status: Synagogue (1898–1940); Profane use (1940–1960); Art gallery (since 1960)
- Status: Inactive (as a synagogue); Repurposed

Location
- Location: Templom út 2, Szolnok, Jász-Nagykun-Szolnok
- Country: Hungary
- Coordinates: 47°10′18″N 20°11′33″E

Architecture
- Architects: Lipót Baumhorn (1898); Lombár Pál (1960)
- Type: Synagogue architecture
- Style: Eclecticism; Romanesque Revival
- Completed: 1898

Specifications
- Length: 34.11 m (111.9 ft)
- Width: 19.83 m (65.1 ft)
- Dome: One (maybe more)
- Materials: Brick

The Szolnok Synagogue is a former Neolog Jewish synagogue, located at Templom út 2, in Szolnok, in the county of Jász-Nagykun-Szolnok, Hungary. Completed in 1898, the building was used a synagogue until World War II and, following restoration, has been used as the Szolnok Gallery, an art gallery, since 1960.

== Architecture ==
The synagogue in Szolnok was designed by Lipót Baumhorn and was completed in 1898. The site is surrounded by an ornate fence, and the synagogue has a winter hall and offices. The eclectic Romanesque Revival building, considered by some to be exaggerated, was the third synagogue of Baumhorn and bears his creative Italian study tour and the influence of Ödön Lechner.

Above the central floor plan was a dome, which, together with its ornaments, is a direct descendant of the style of the Budapest Museum of Applied Arts. The four facades, on the other hand, contain elements of Italian Gothic architecture. The mass of the exterior and the richness of the interior were in harmony. The building has an external dimension of 19.83 m × 34.11 m (65.1 ft × 111.9 ft) and a square interior space of 17.95 m × 17.85 m (58.9 ft × 58.6 ft). The dome is underpinned by columnar columns and the interior is surrounded by a female gallery. In front of the eastern wall, the pedestal and the ornately shaped crib were once separated by a cast-iron fence.

Extensively renovated and restored in 1960, the museum and art gallery is operated by Damjanich János Museum.

== See also ==
- History of the Jews in Hungary
- List of synagogues in Hungary
