= Gyöngyös Synagogue =

Former synagogue in Gyöngyös, Hungary

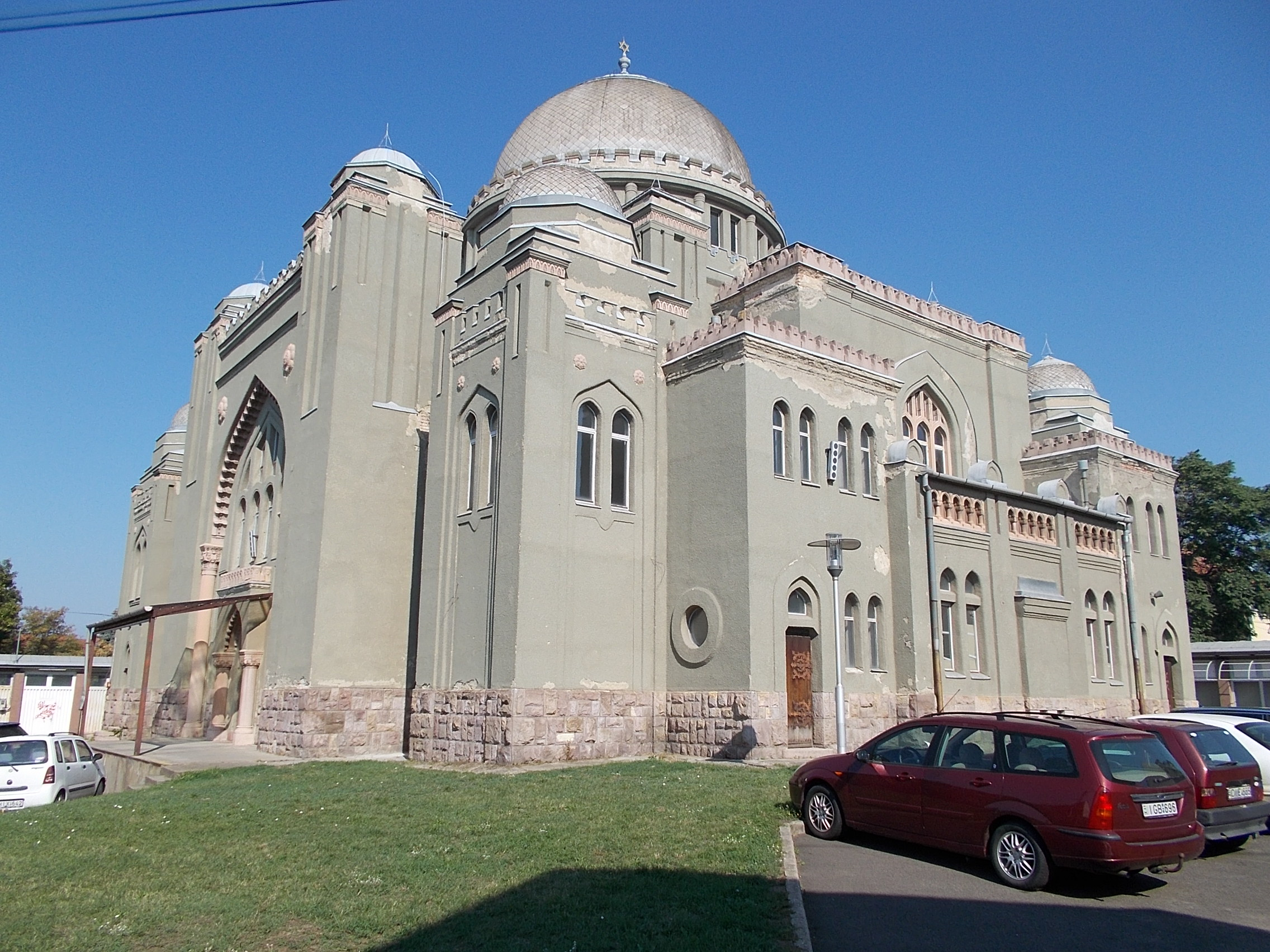
- The former synagogue in 2015

- Location of the former synagogue in Hungary

Religion
- Affiliation: Neolog Judaism (former)
- Rite: Nusach Ashkenaz
- Ecclesiastical or organizational status: Synagogue (1930–c. 1939); Profane use (1945–1990s); Cultural center (in development)
- Status: Inactive (as a synagogue); Repurposed

Location
- Location: Vármegye Road, Gyöngyös
- Country: Hungary
- Interactive map of Gyöngyös Synagogue
- Coordinates: 47°47′01″N 19°55′21″E

Architecture
- Architects: 1930: Lipót Baumhorn; György Somogyi; since 2015: Laszlo Eperjesi; Rene Kalacsi
- Type: Synagogue architecture
- Style: Eclecticism; Art Deco; Moorish Revival
- Completed: 1930

Specifications
- Dome: Two (maybe more)
- Materials: Brick

The Gyöngyös Synagogue, also called the Great New Synagogue, is a former Neolog Jewish synagogue, located in Gyöngyös, Hungary. Completed in 1930, the building was used a synagogue until World War II, subsequently for profane use, and in 2014 it was announced that the former synagogue would be transformed into a cultural center.

== History ==
The large, domed synagogue was built in 1930 according to the plans of Lipót Baumhorn with the support of György Somogyi, his son-in-law. The building was designed in an eclectic combination of Art Deco and Moorish Revival styles, decorated with medieval European and Eastern elements.

In 2014 it was announced that the severely dilapidated former synagogue building was being renovated and converted into a venue for cultural programs.

== Gallery ==
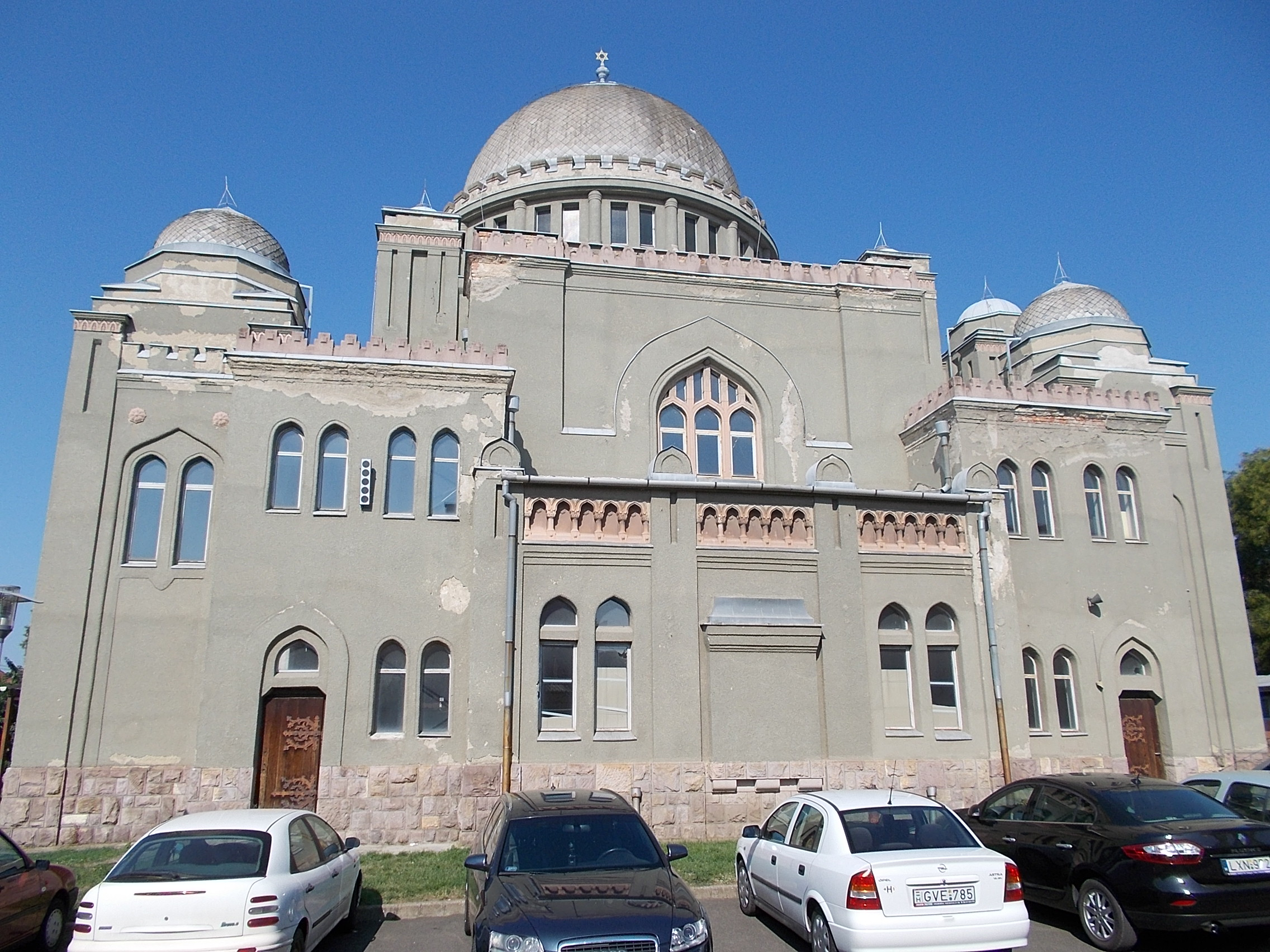

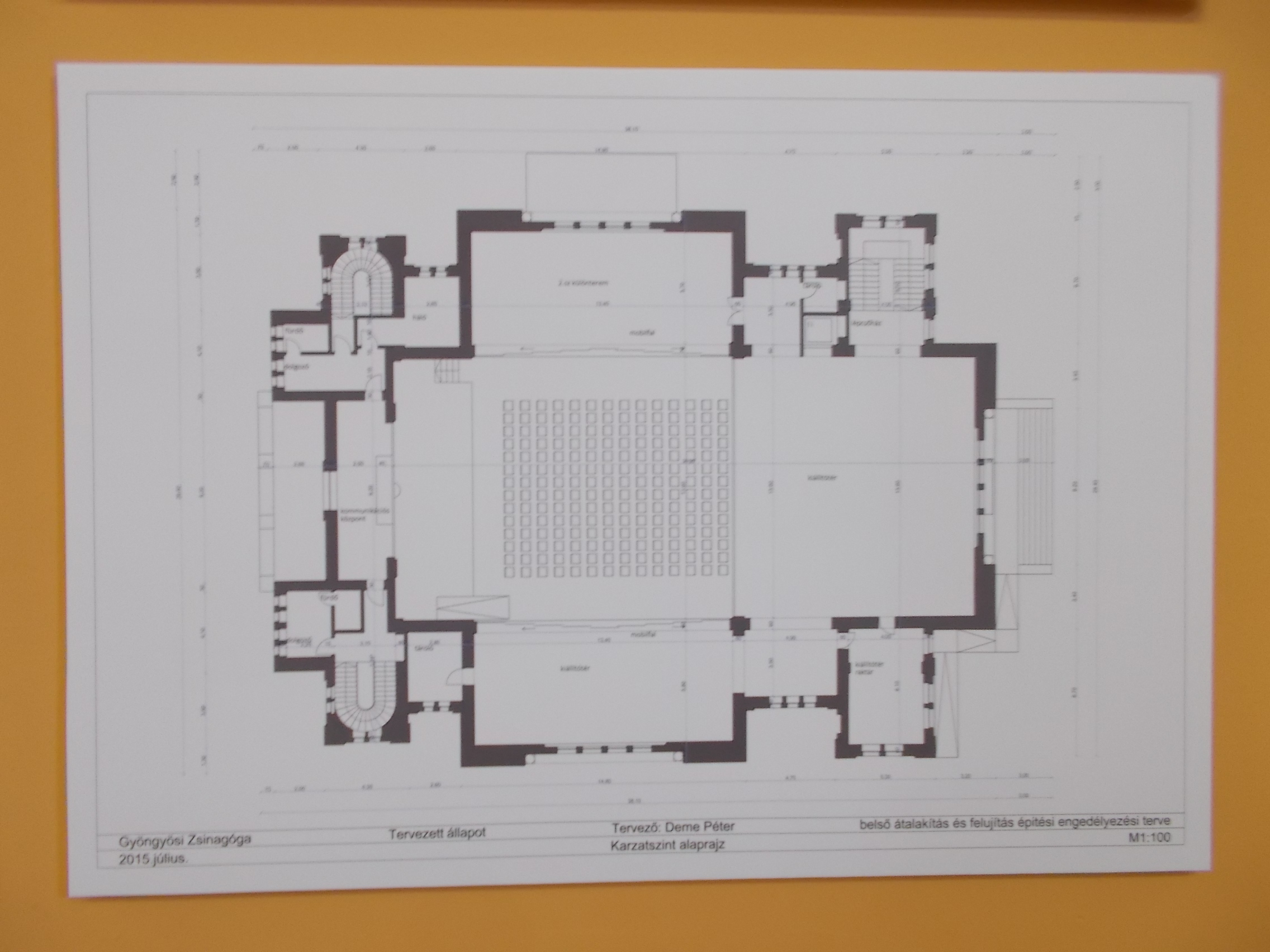

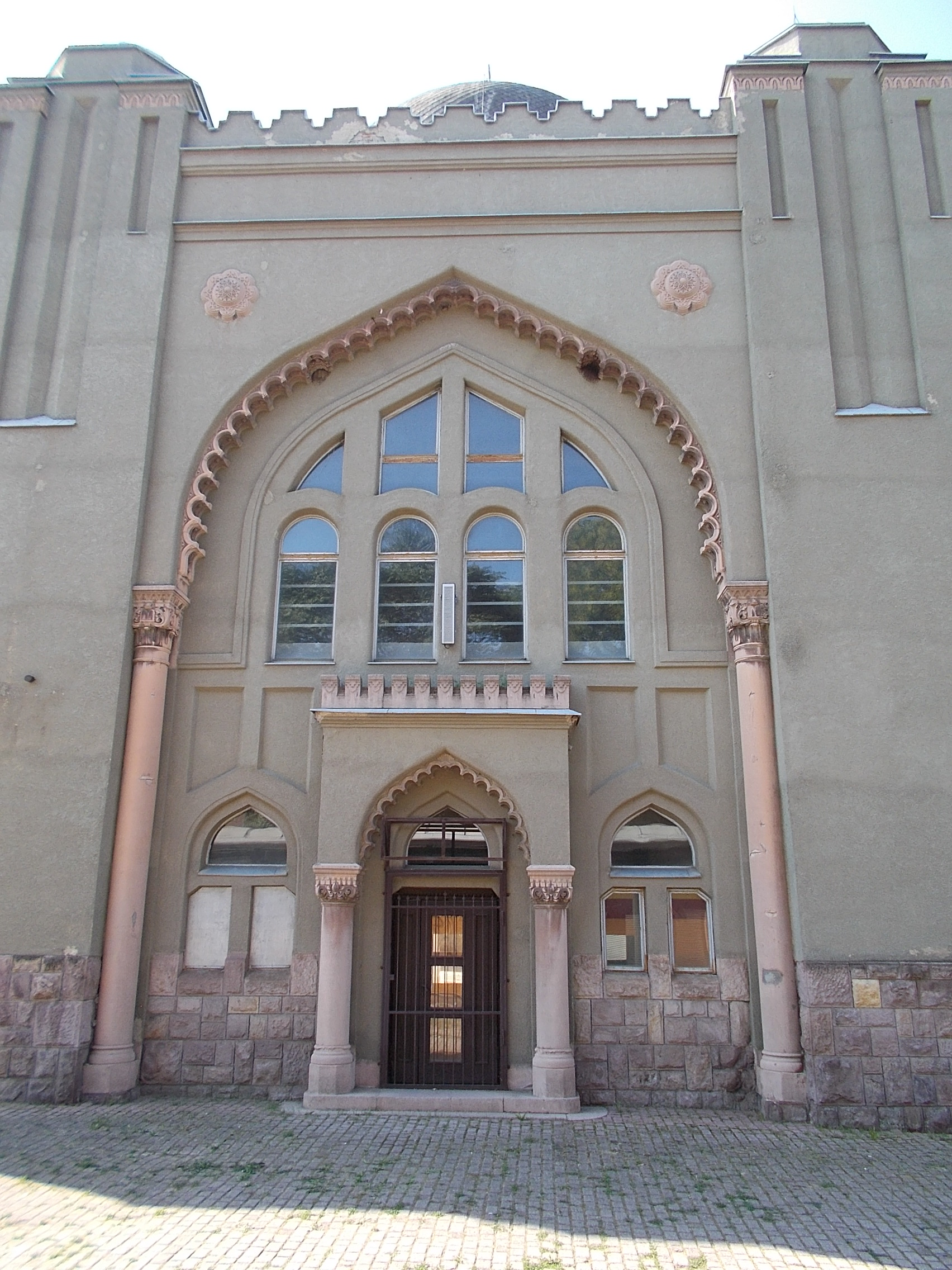

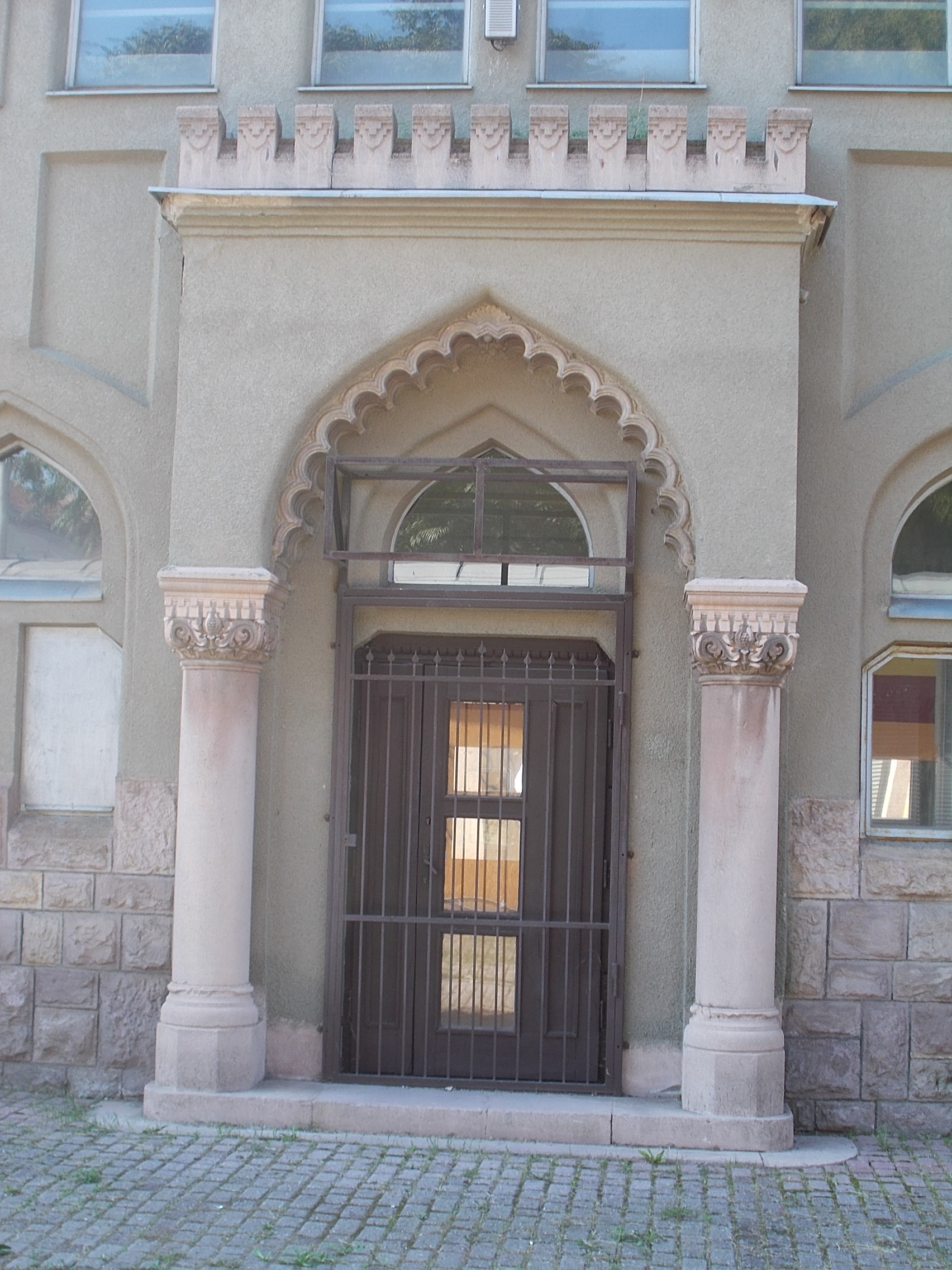

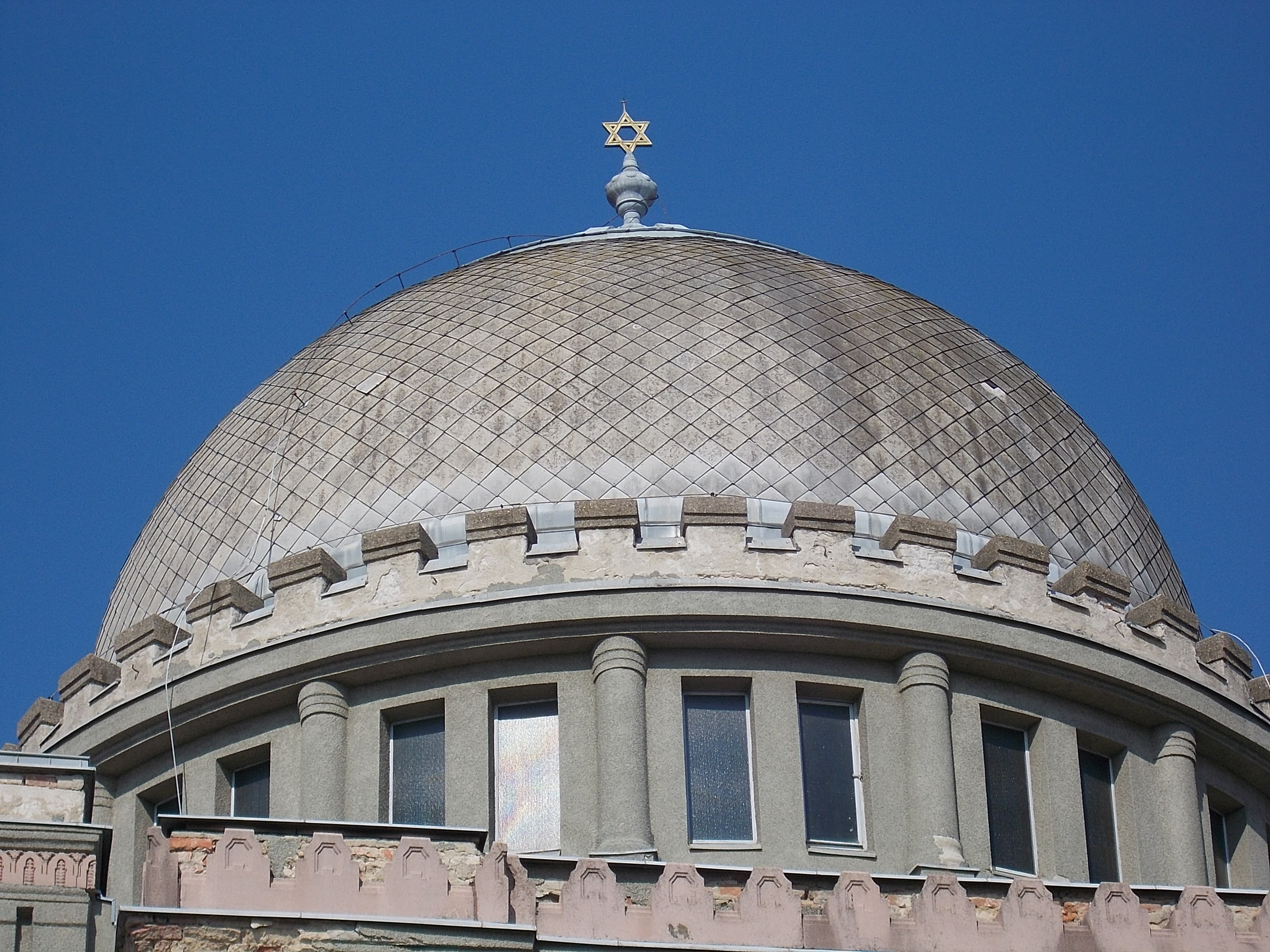

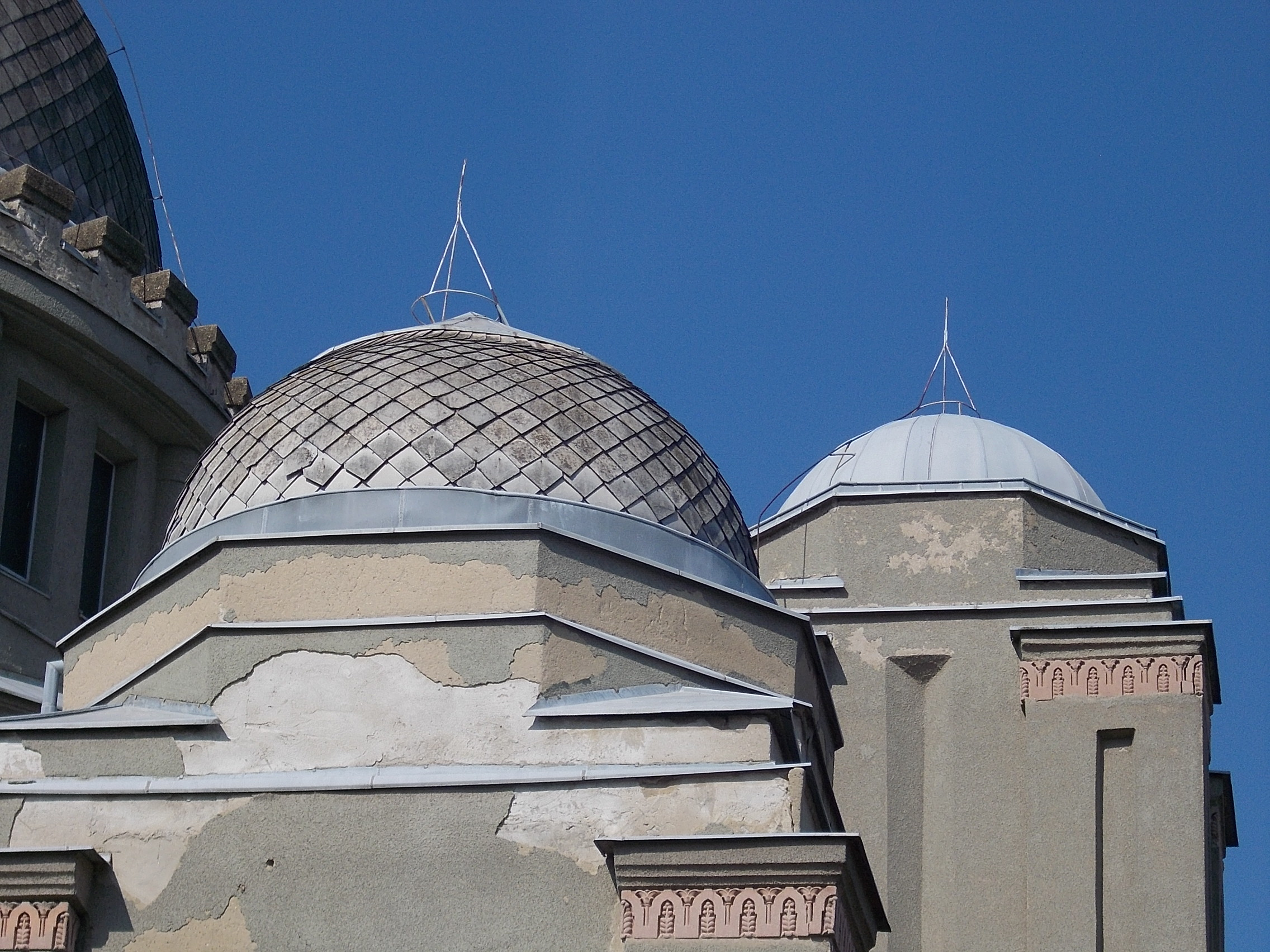

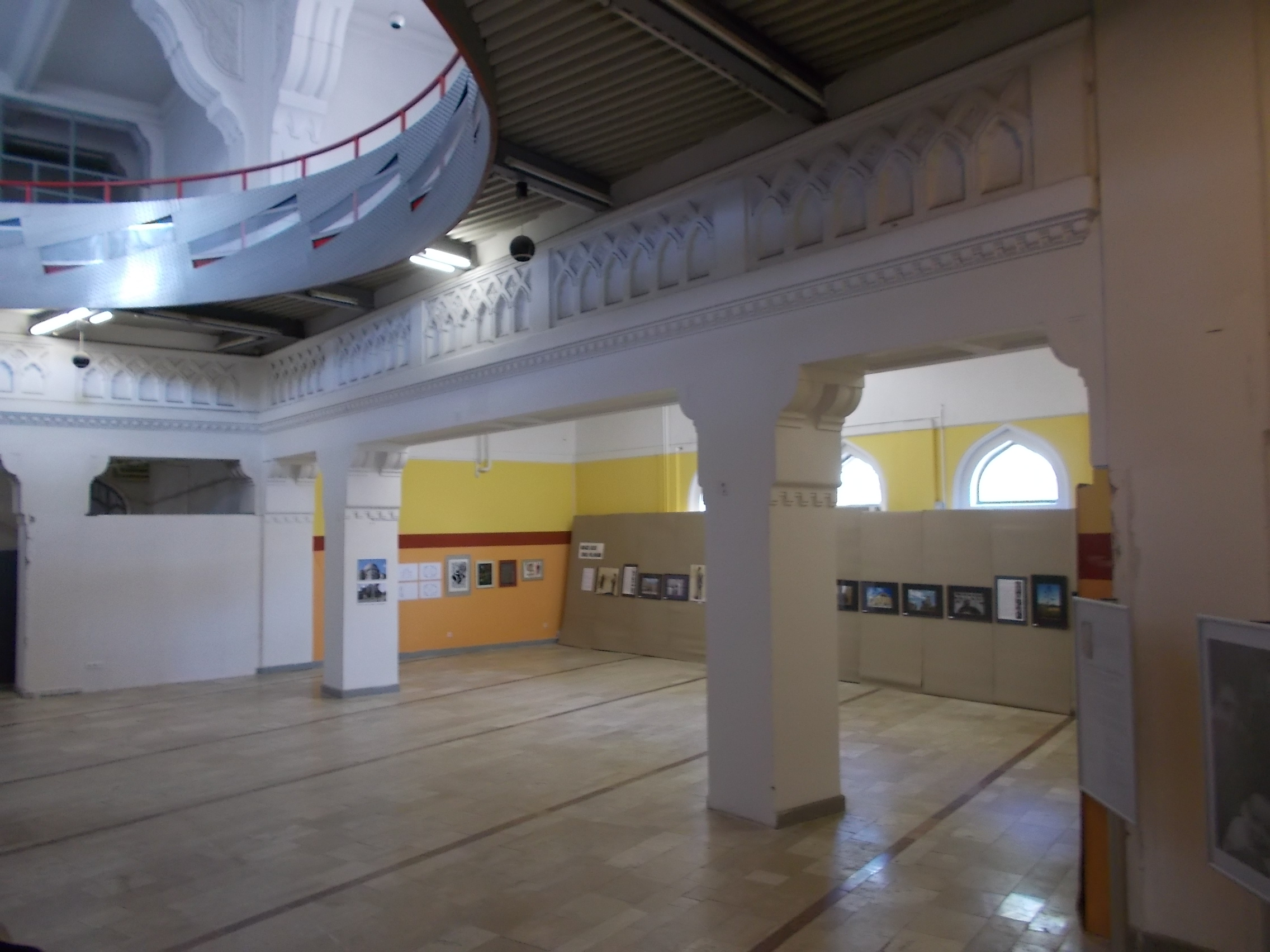

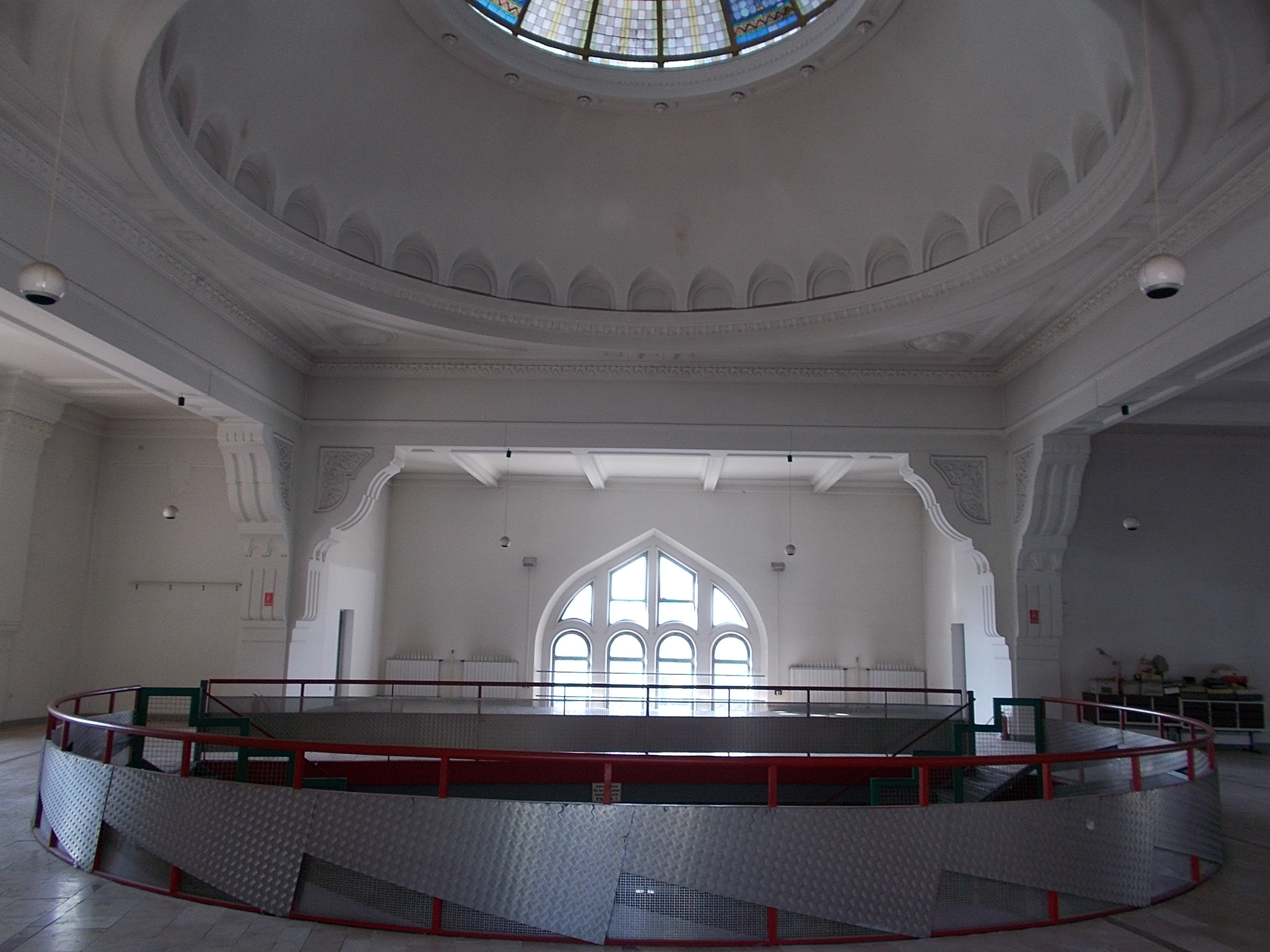

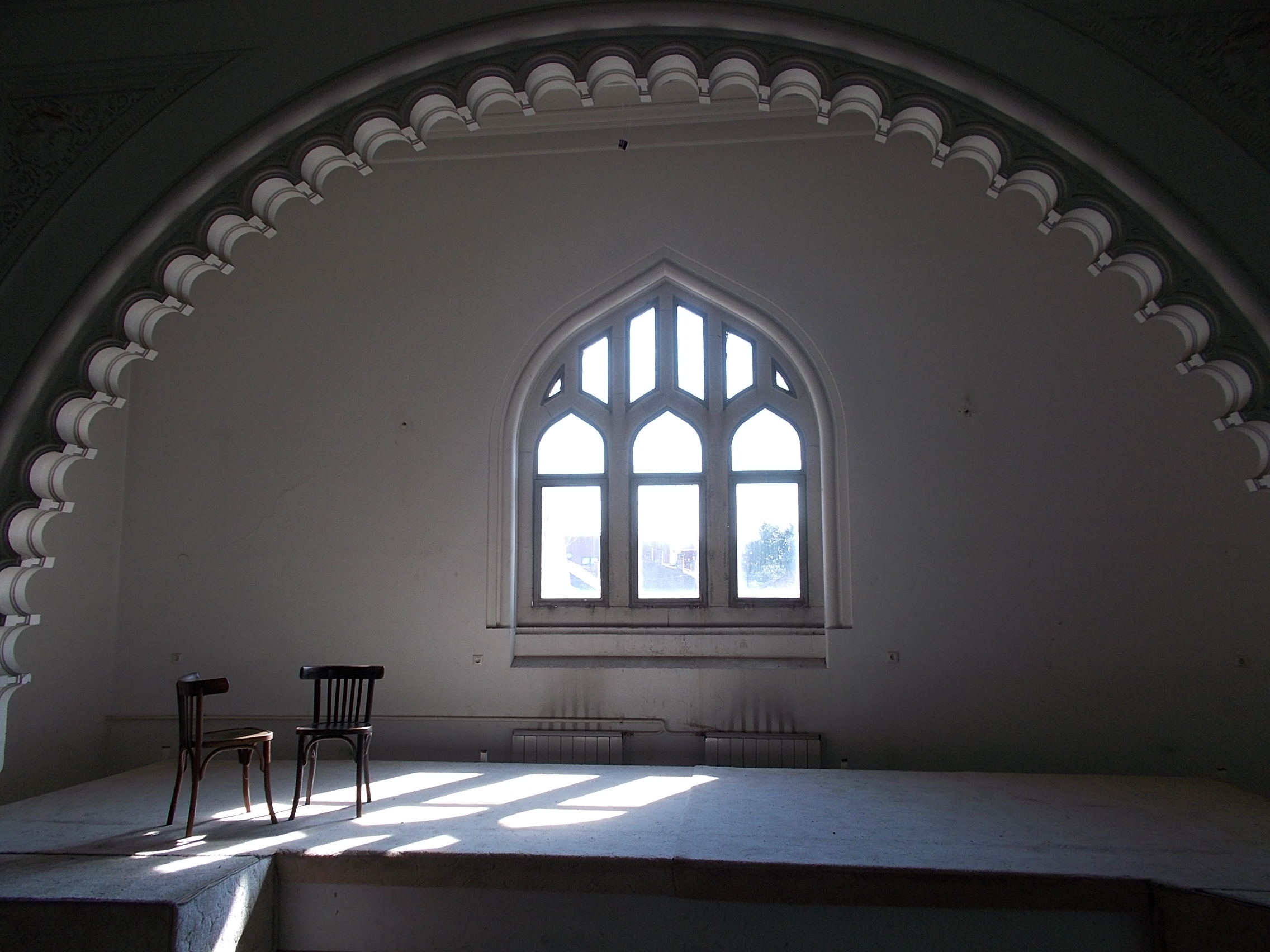

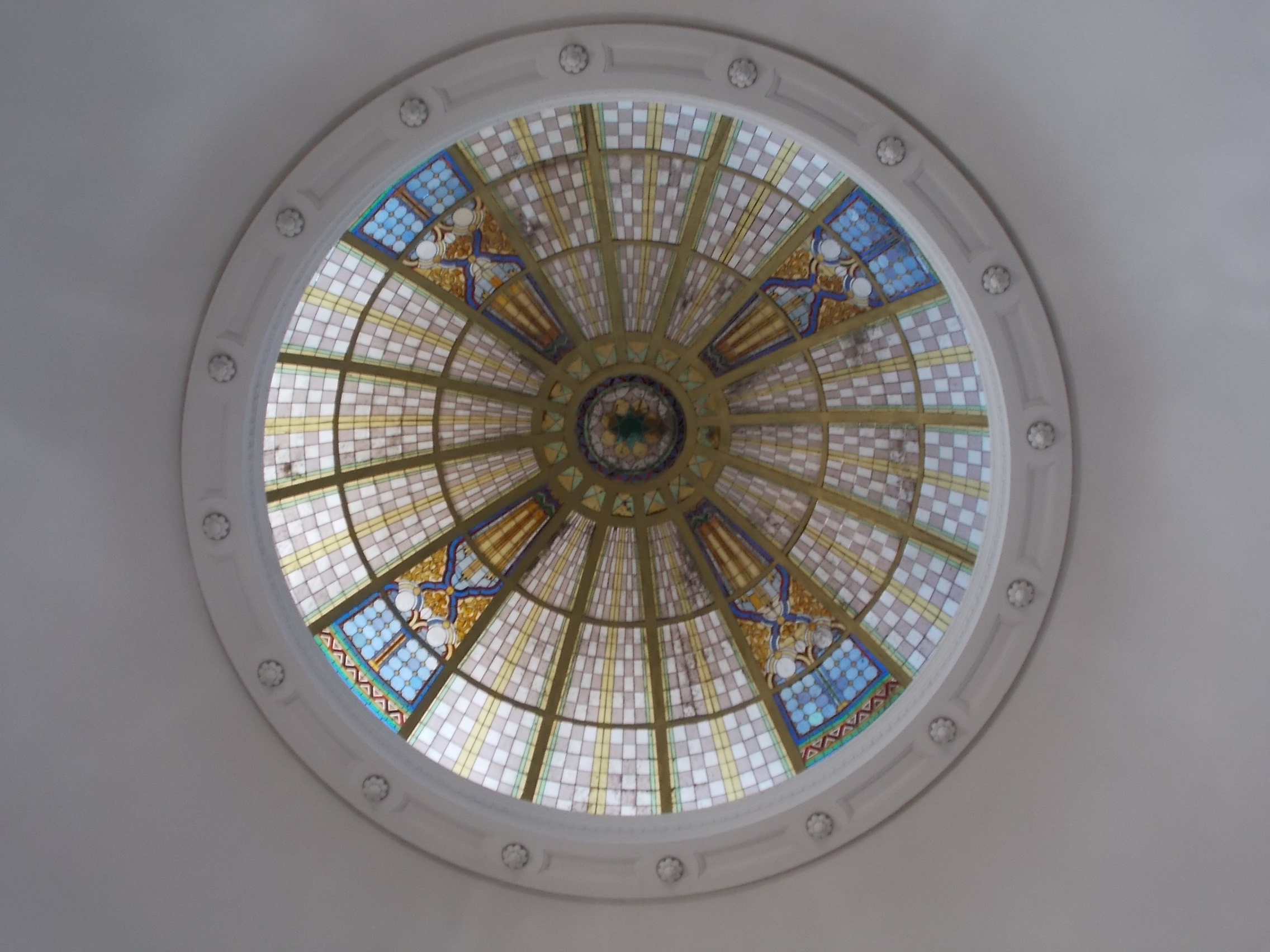

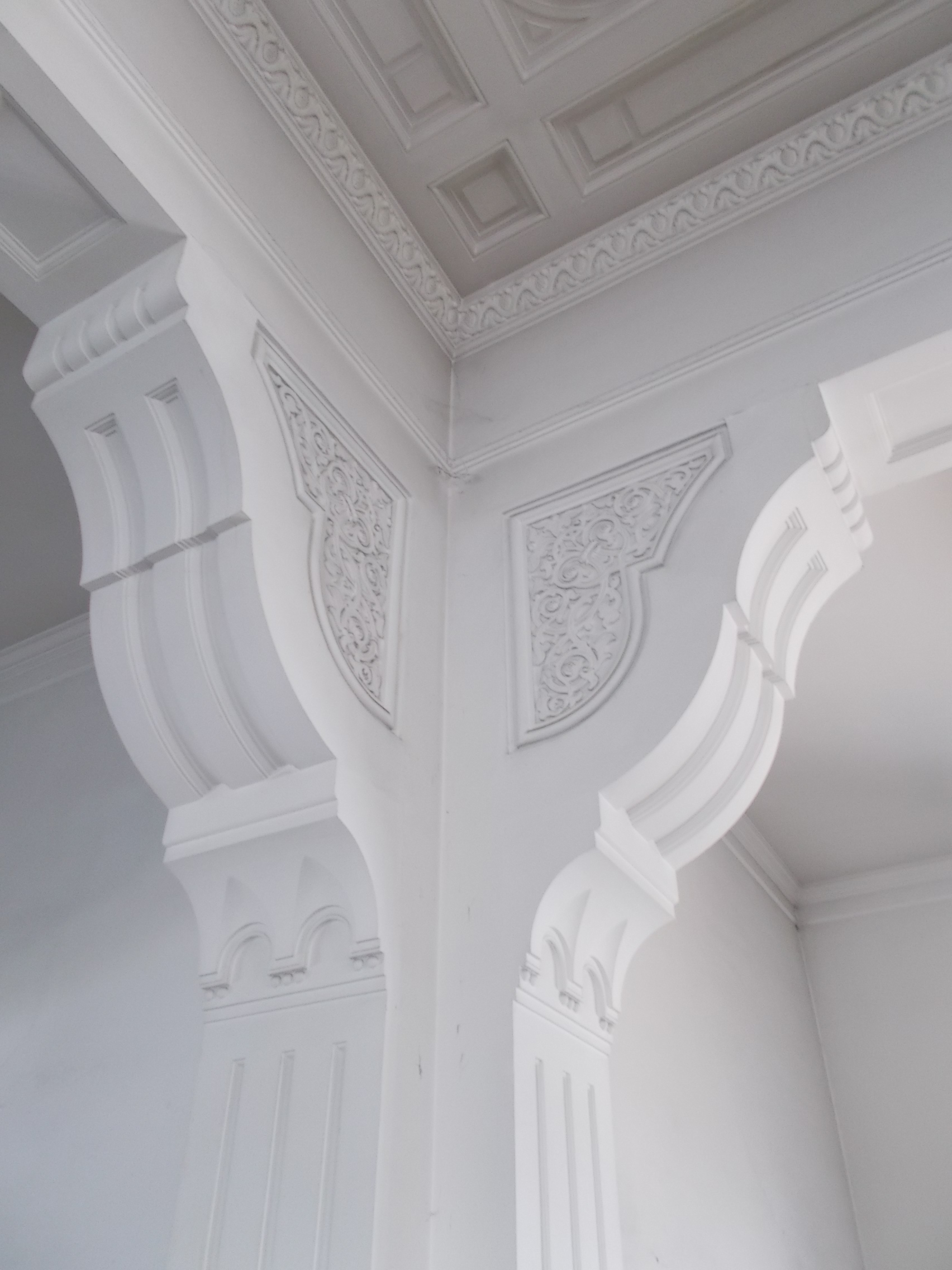

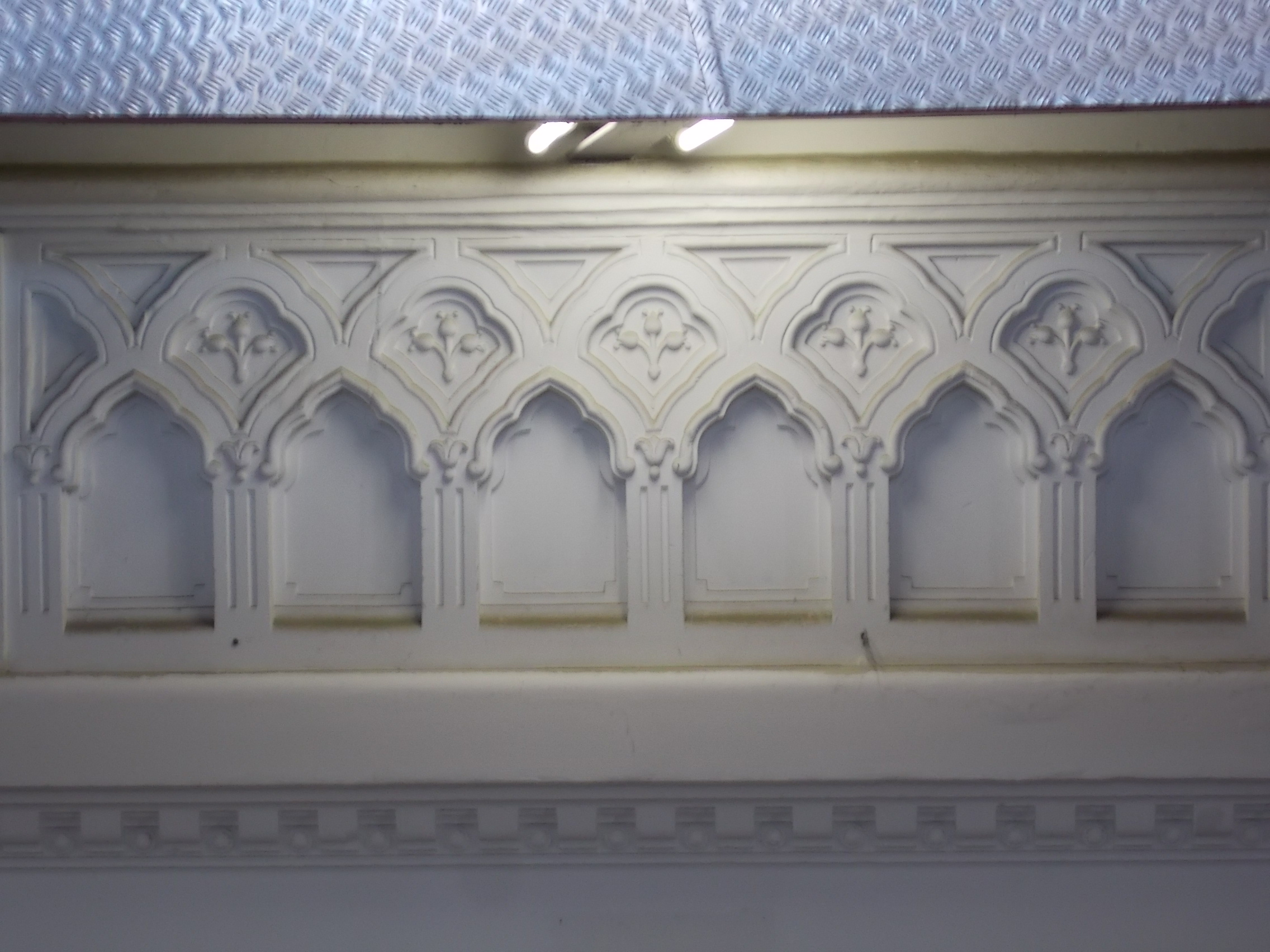

== See also ==
- History of the Jews in Hungary
- List of synagogues in Hungary
