= Nyíregyháza New Synagogue =

Synagogue in Nyíregyháza, Hungary

Nyíregyháza Synagogue
- Hungarian: Nyíregyházi új zsinagóga
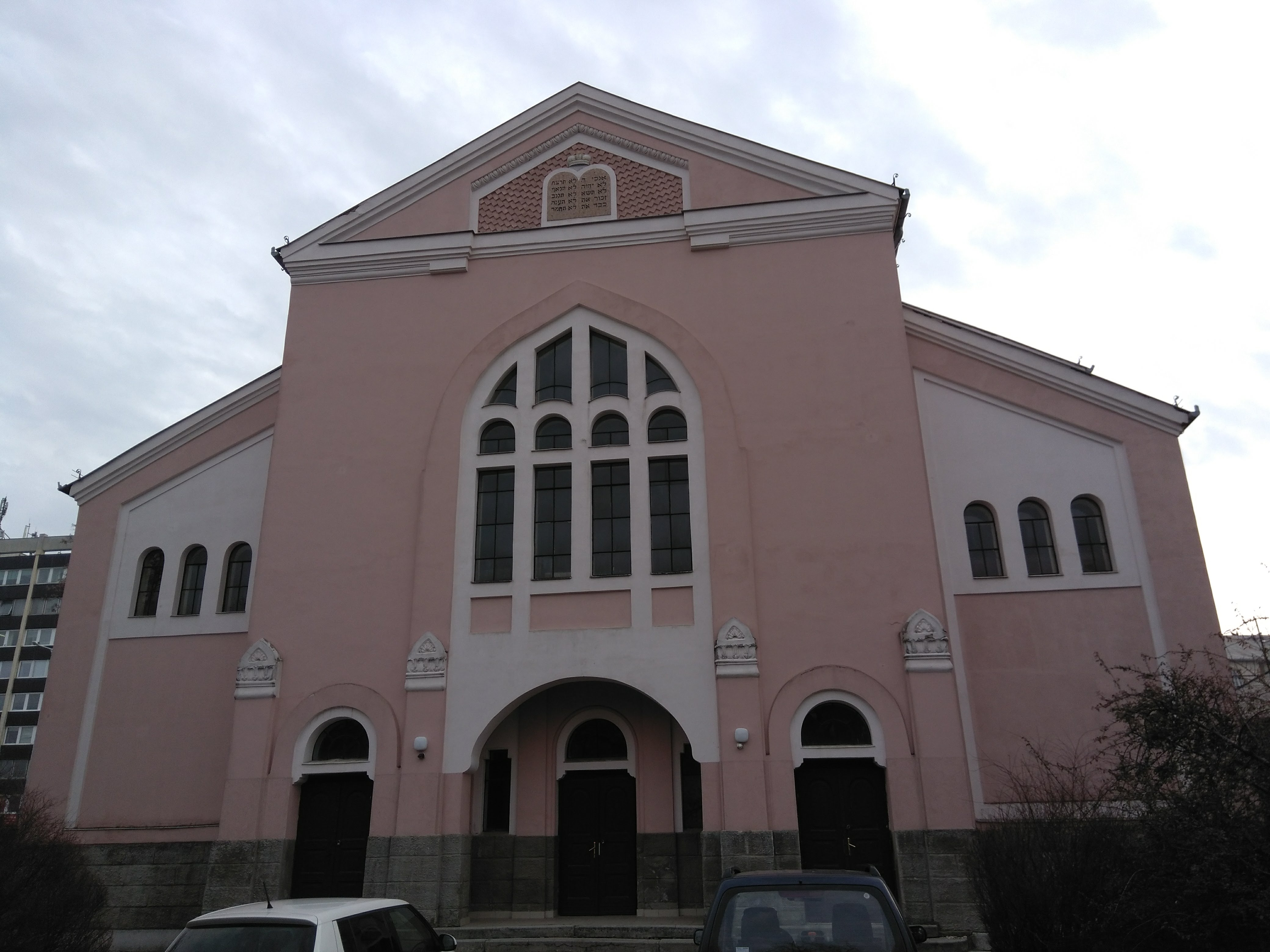
- The synagogue in 2018

- Location of the synagogue in Hungary

Religion
- Affiliation: Orthodox Judaism
- Rite: Nusach Ashkenaz (former)
- Ecclesiastical or organizational status: Synagogue
- Status: Active

Location
- Location: Nyíregyháza, Great Hungarian Plains, Szabolcs-Szatmár-Bereg
- Country: Hungary
- Interactive map of Nyíregyháza Synagogue
- Coordinates: 47°57′27″N 21°42′46″E

Architecture
- Architect: Lipót Baumhorn
- Type: Synagogue architecture
- Style: Eclectic; Art Deco
- Established: 1865 (as a congregation)
- Groundbreaking: 1924
- Completed: 1932

Specifications
- Capacity: 700 seats
- Length: 31.22 m (102.4 ft)
- Width: 21.14 m (69.4 ft)
- Materials: Brick

The Nyíregyháza Synagogue (Hungarian: Nyíregyházi új zsinagóga), or Nyíregyháza New Synagogue, is an Orthodox Jewish congregation and synagogue, located in the town of Nyíregyháza, in the Great Hungarian Plains region, in the county of Szabolcs-Szatmár-Bereg, Hungary. The building was completed in 1932. The congregation was founded by Neolog Jews in 1865, who worshipped in the Ashkenazi rite. The congregation later merged to form an Orthodox community who ceased worshipping in the Ashkenazi tradition after World War II.

== History ==
Designed by Lipót Baumhorn in an eclectic Art Deco style, the synagogue was built between 1924 and 1932. Its external dimensions are 21.14 m × 31.22 m (69.4 ft × 102.4 ft), while the Synagogue Square is 22 m × 19.35 m (72.2 ft × 63.5 ft). The synagogue has seating capacity for 410 males and 286 females. For women's seating, a gallery was built around the three sides of the interior. In the middle of the interior is the Bema.

The main architectural motif of the interior is the so-called eastern wall (Mizrah) and the cupboard. The latter is a party-building with double Corinthian columns. The semicircular cab is inscribed with: "Father, King, open the gates of heaven to our prayers." (Psalm 113: 3). The lake is surrounded by a large arcade with lined ornamentation, which integrates the lake cabin with the ornate circular window, bridging the columns in a semicircle. The wall's curve has a lion detailing with text that reads: "Praise the Eternal Name from Sunrise to Sunset." (Psalm 113: 3).

The synagogue, together with other religious buildings in its vicinity, are in active use by the local Jewish community.

== See also ==
- History of the Jews in Hungary
- List of synagogues in Hungary
