= Dózsa György Street Synagogue =

Former synagogue in Budapest, Hungary

- Hungarian: Dózsa György úti zsinagóga
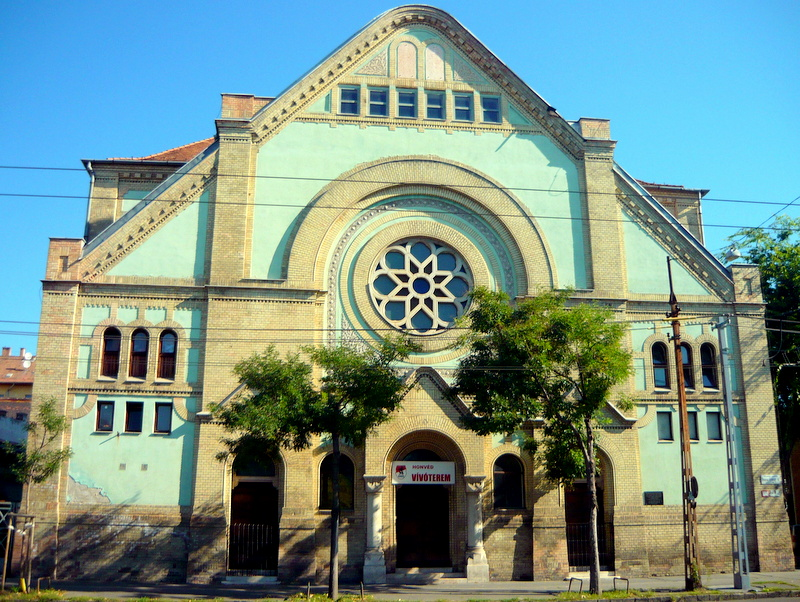
- The façade of the former synagogue in 2015

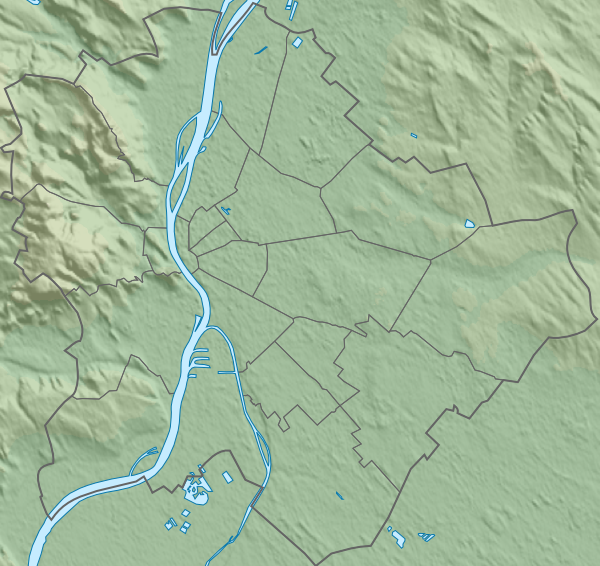
- Location of the former synagogue in Budapest

Religion
- Affiliation: Orthodox Judaism (former)
- Rite: Nusach Ashkenaz
- Ecclesiastical or organisational status: Synagogue (1909–c. 1939); Indoor sports center (since 1984)
- Status: Inactive (as a synagogue); Repurposed

Location
- Location: 55 Dózsa György Street (formerly Aréna Street), Újlipótváros, XIII District, Budapest 1134
- Country: Hungary
- Coordinates: 47°31′21″N 19°04′02″E

Architecture
- Architects: Lipót Baumhorn (1909); László Benczúr (1984)
- Type: Synagogue architecture
- Style: Art Nouveau
- Completed: 1909
- Capacity: 800 seats

The Dózsa György Street Synagogue (Hungarian: Dózsa György úti zsinagóga), or Angyalföld Synagogue, is a former Orthodox Jewish synagogue located on Dózsa György Street (formerly Aréna Street), in Újlipótváros, in the XIII District of Budapest, in Hungary. Completed as a synagogue in 1909, used as a concentration camp during World War II, and subsequently for profaned use, the building was repurposed in 1984 as an indoor sports center by the Budapest Honvéd Sports Association as a fencing hall.

The congregation continues to worship in the cultural hall located on the site; led by Rabbi Peter Deutsch.

== History ==
The synagogue was built to serve the Jews of northern Pest after the failure of the Lipótvár synagogue's plan next to the then Aréna Street (now György Dózsa Street). The plot, opposite the former Jewish cemetery, was on the other side of the road and was purchased on February 27, 1907. Construction was started this year according to the plans of Lipót Baumhorn, and the synagogue was completed in 1909. Dr. Hevesi Simon and Wilheim Joachim inaugurated the house of worship.

At the end of World War II, during 1944–45, the building was used as a collection camp, and after the fighting ended, it was once again a prayer house. However, by the end of the 1940s, the Jewish community, which had shrunk as a result of emigration, had used the synagogue as a storehouse in the former cultural hall.

Ownership of the building was awarded to the Honvéd Budapest in 1984; after the renovation and rebuilding, its boxing and fencing department was established here.

== The building ==
The building of the synagogue consists of a central square in the middle, a foyer and a shrine. The central square is covered by a circular dome. Out of a total of 800 seats, 406 are on the ground floor and the other on the first floor. The interior walls were decorated with geometric motifs in yellow, blue, red and brown.

After the Honvéd took over the building, it was renovated and rebuilt internally. During the reconstruction carried out according to the plans of László Benczúr, two new slabs were installed, which provided three levels of training. During the design of the floor, the new elements could be demolished without damaging the old elements of the building. During the renovation, the old colors were used to decorate the interior, but only the geometric shapes, the original sacred symbols, were not restored.

== Gallery ==
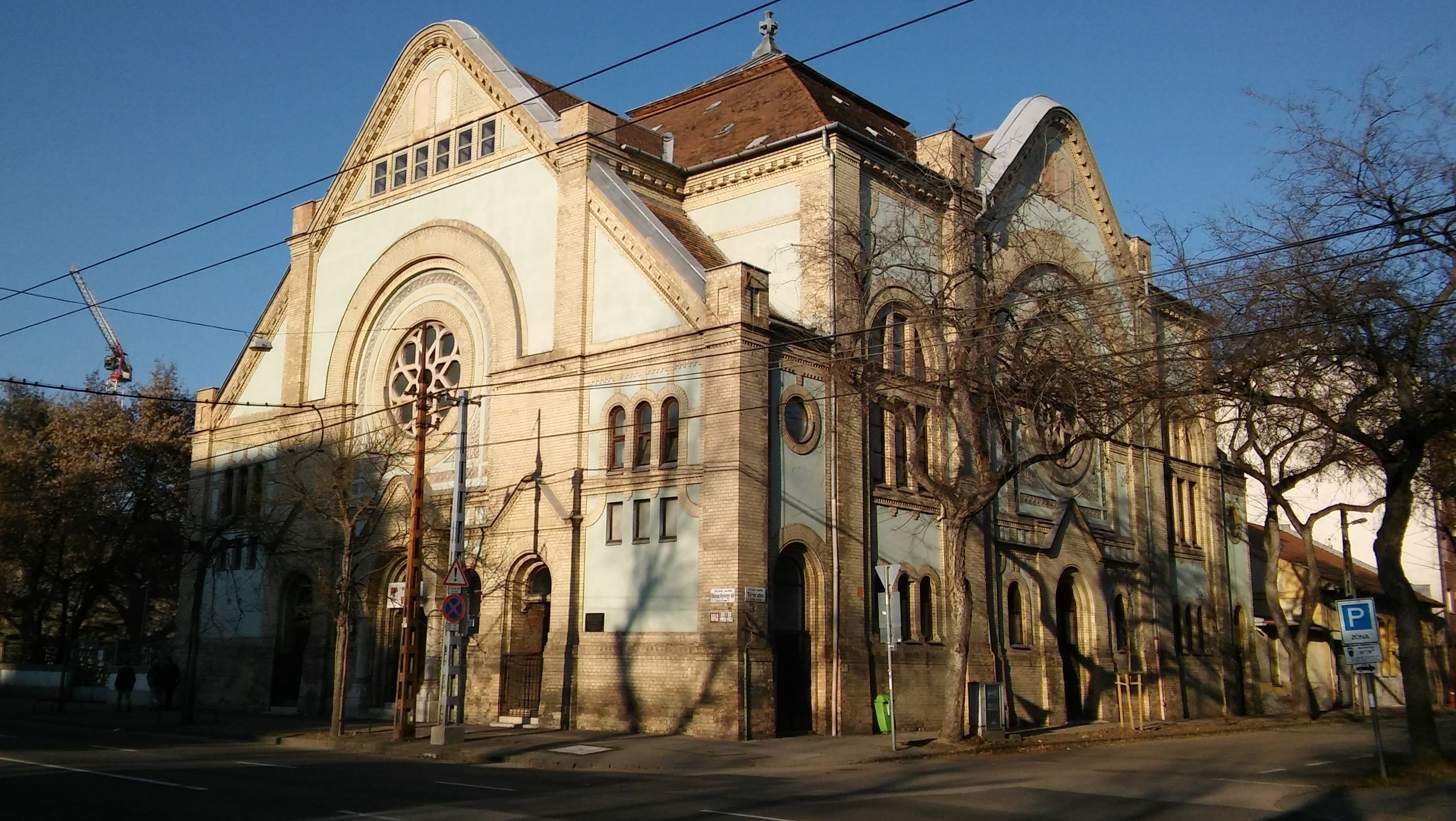

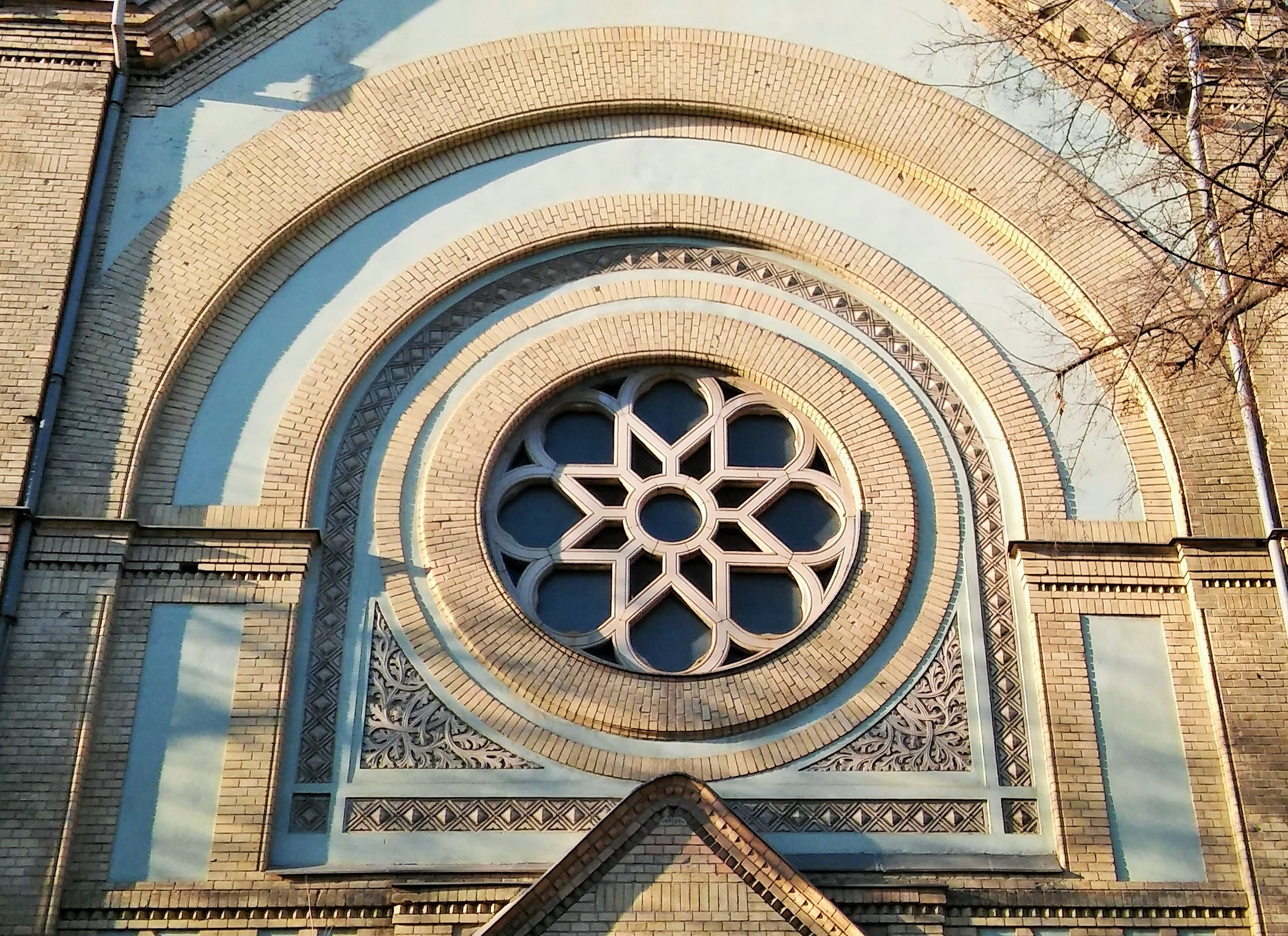

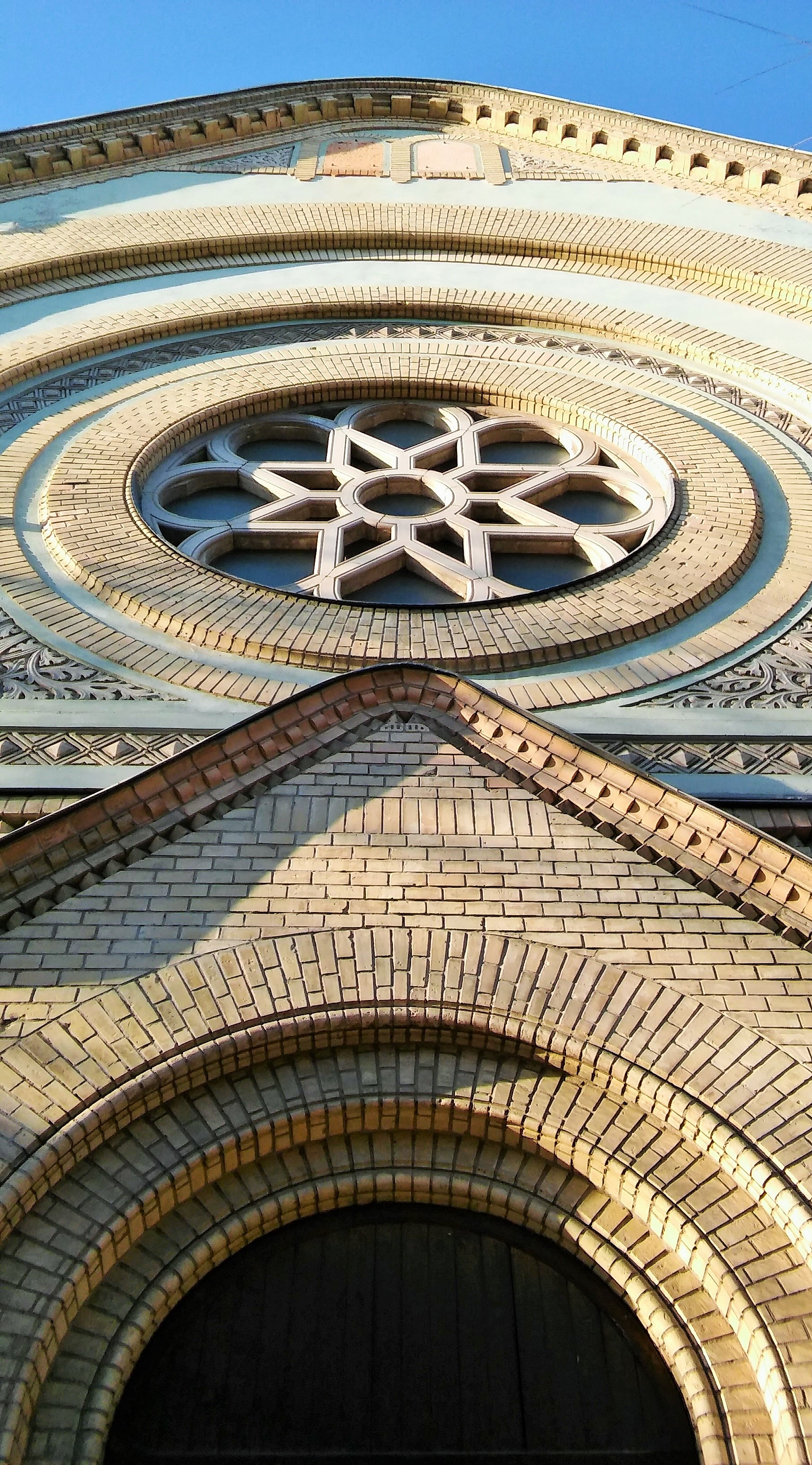

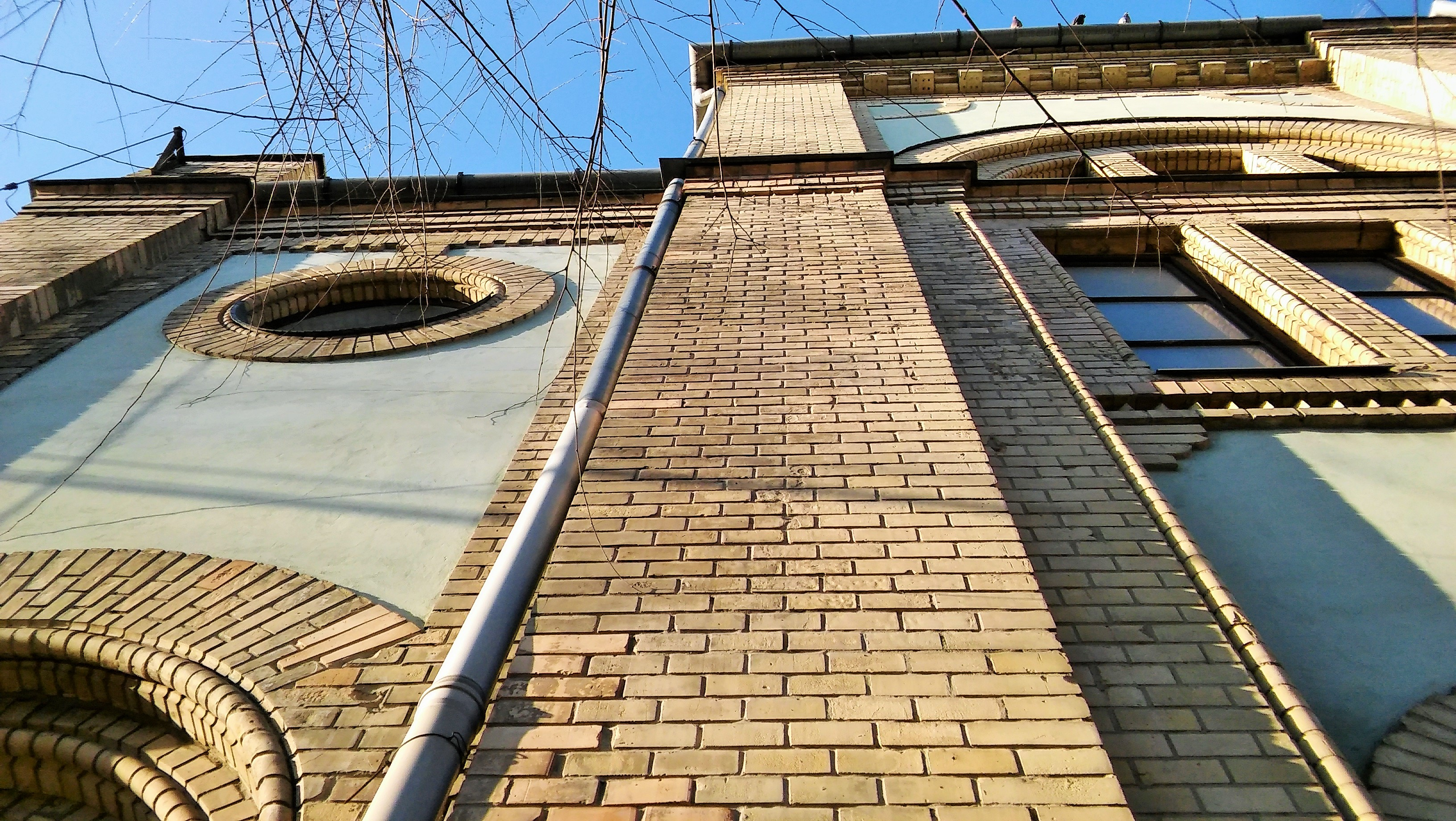

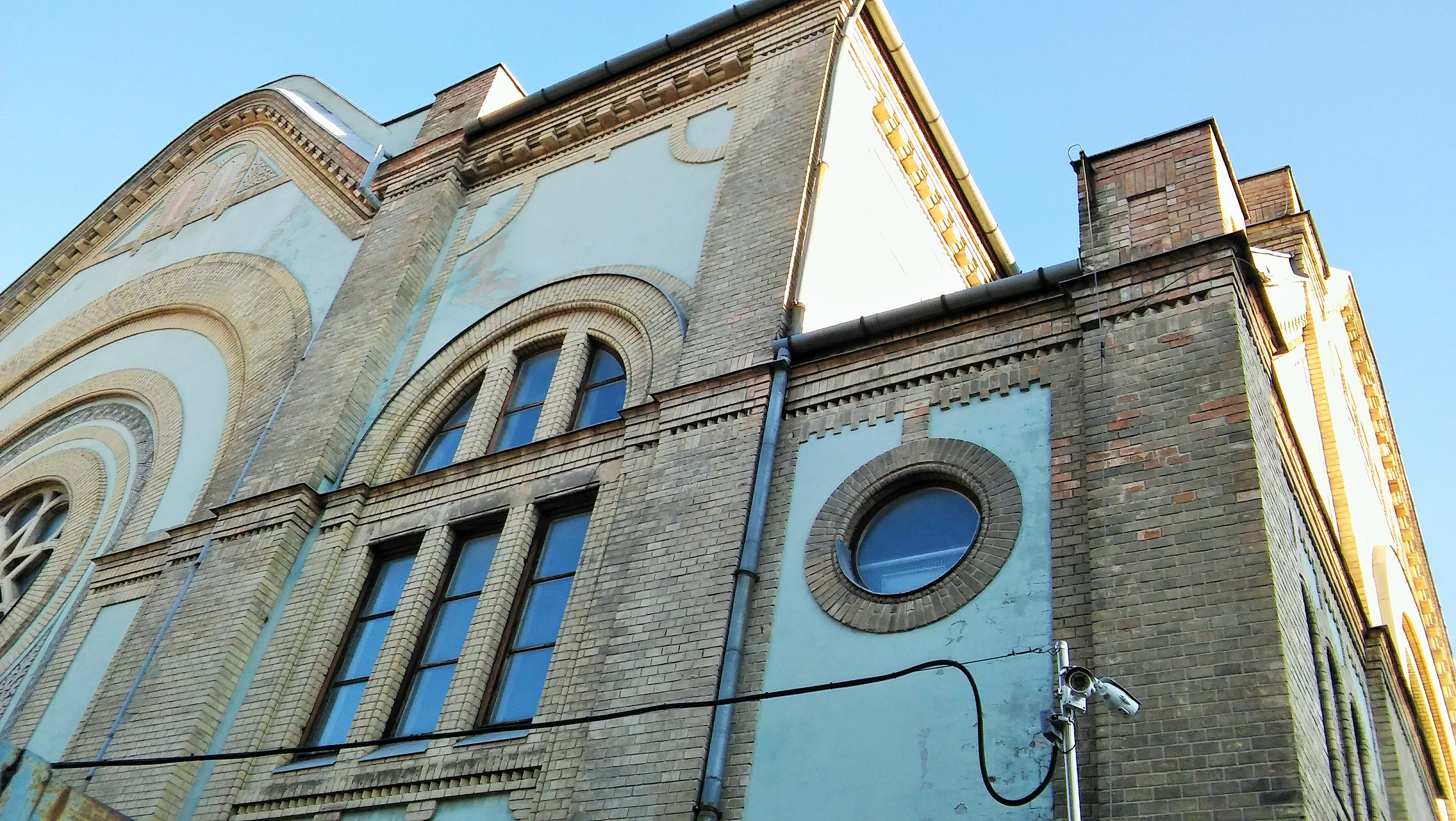

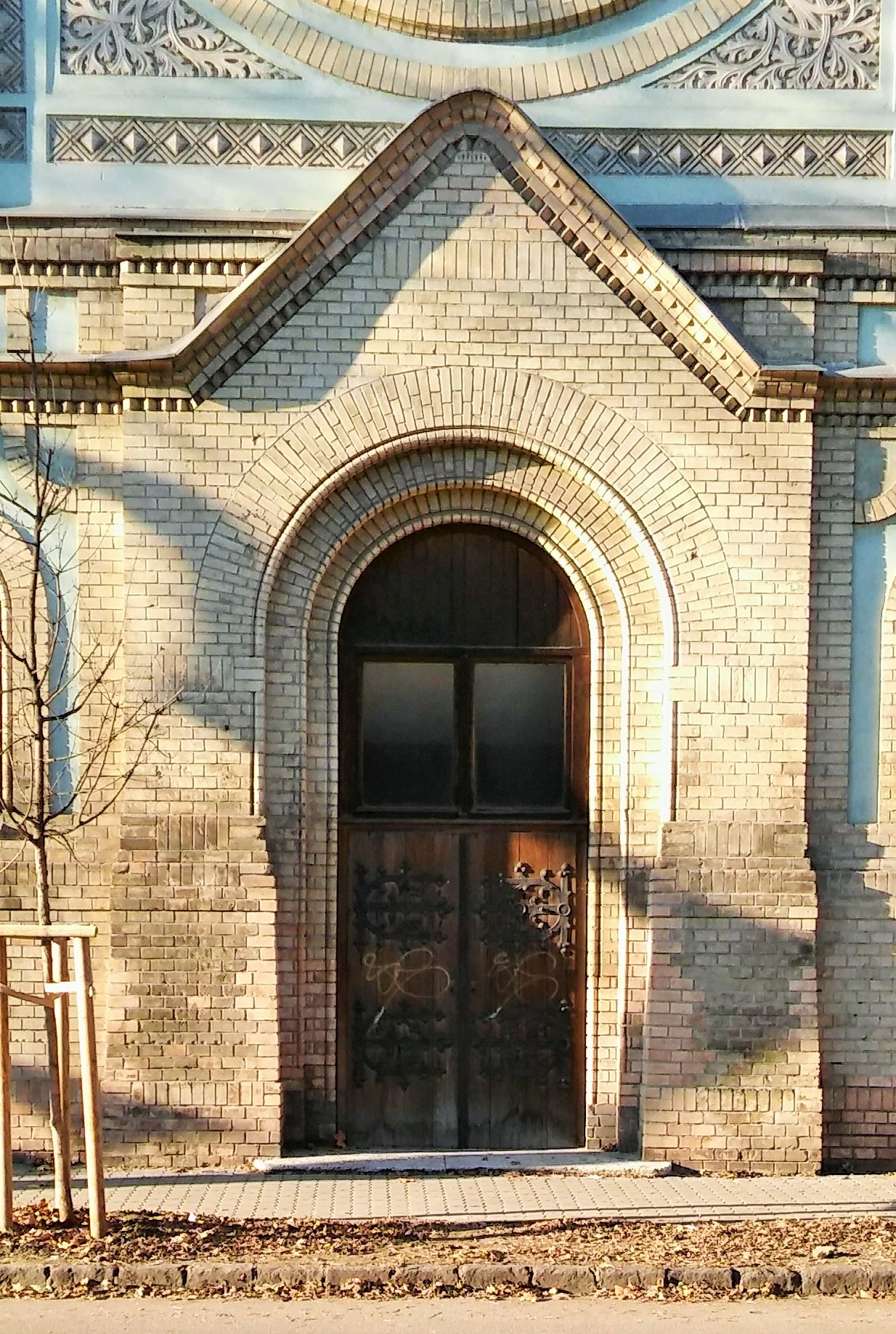

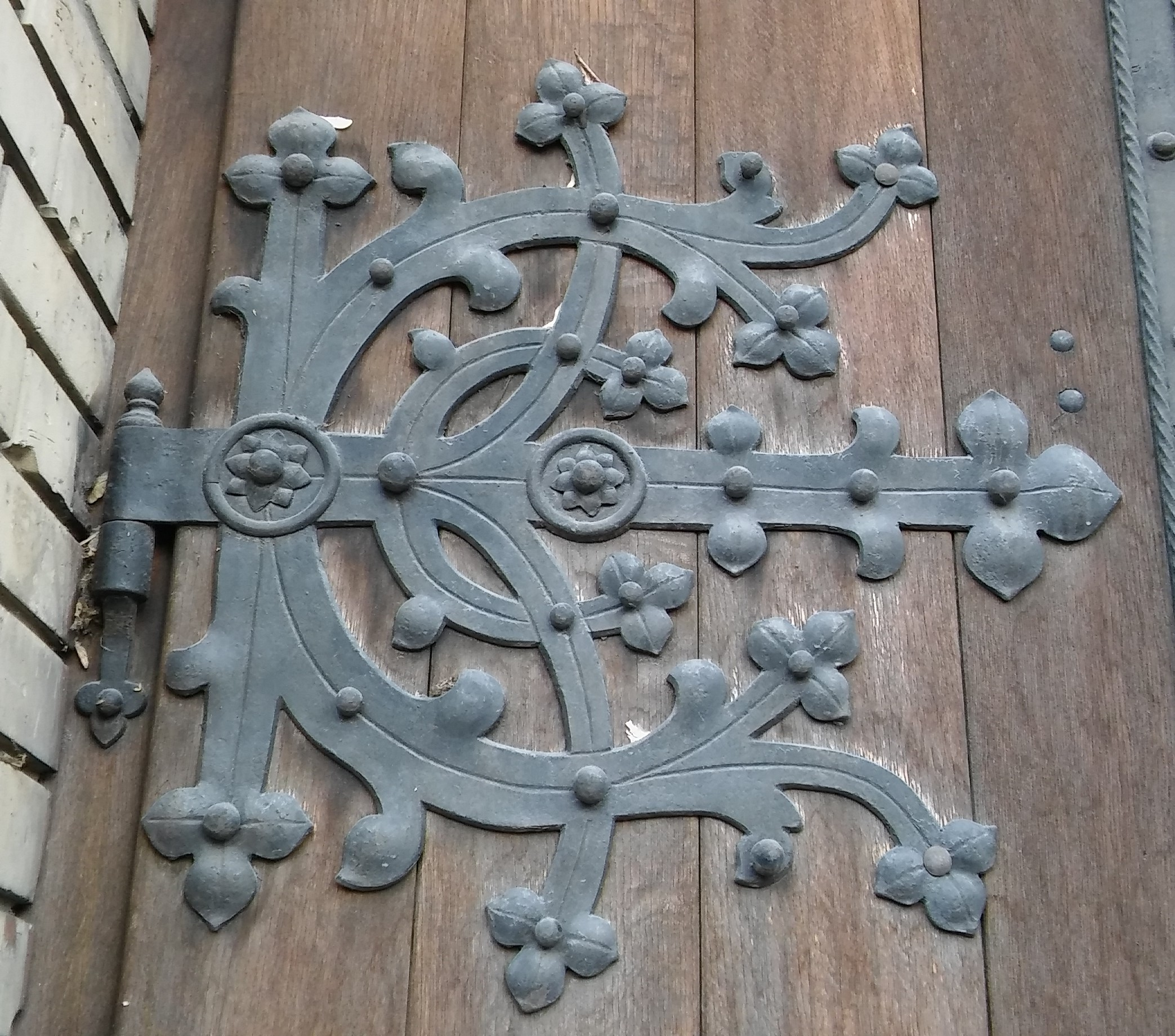

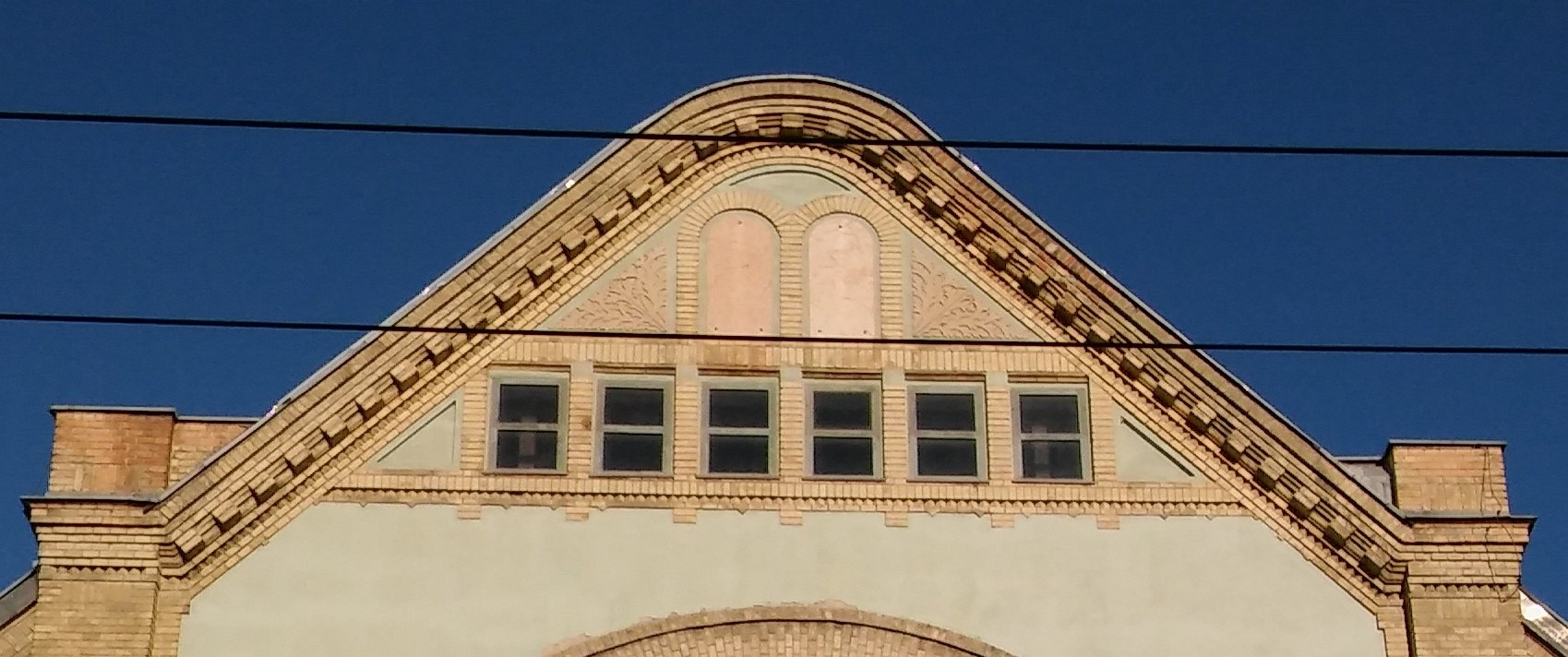

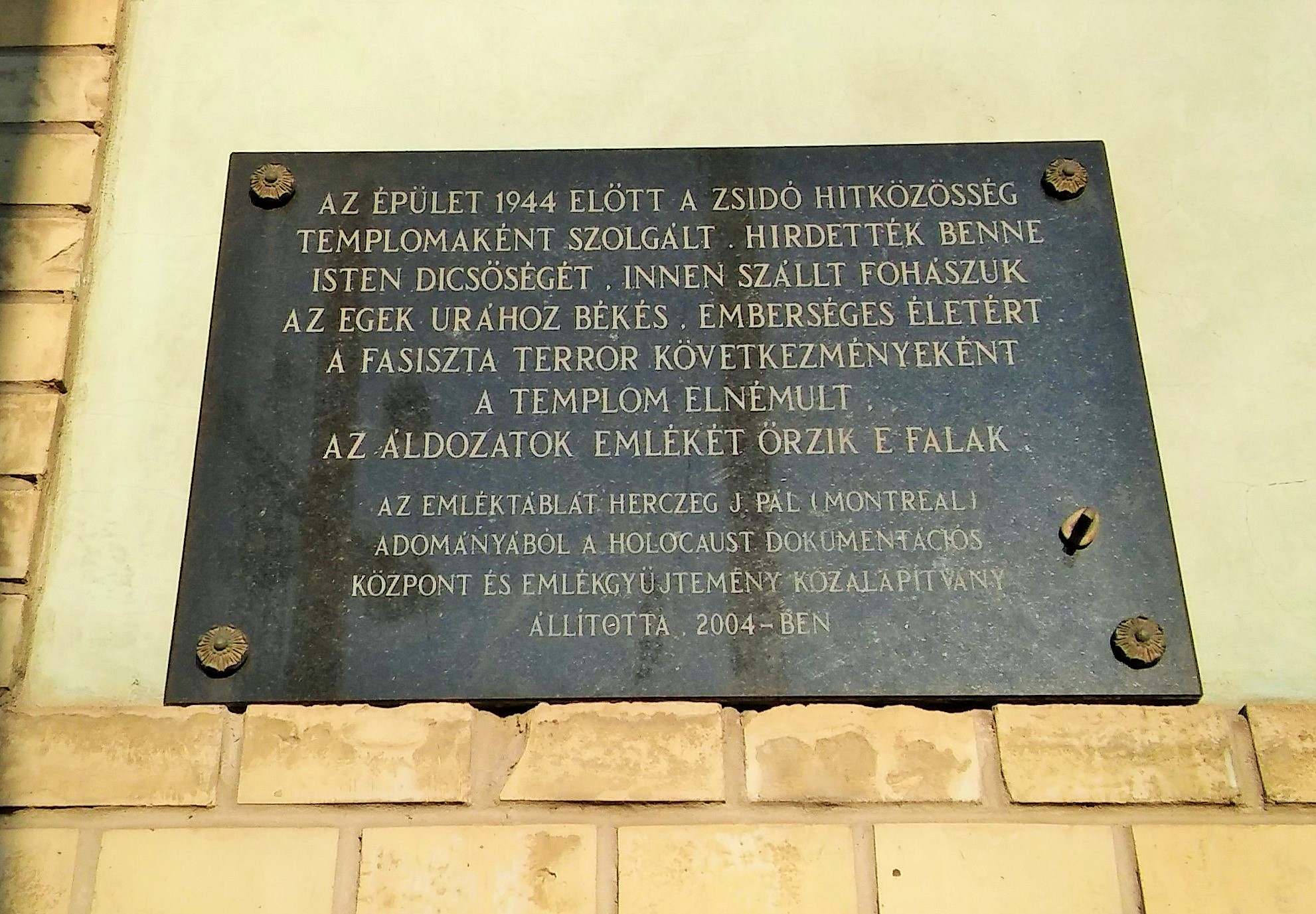

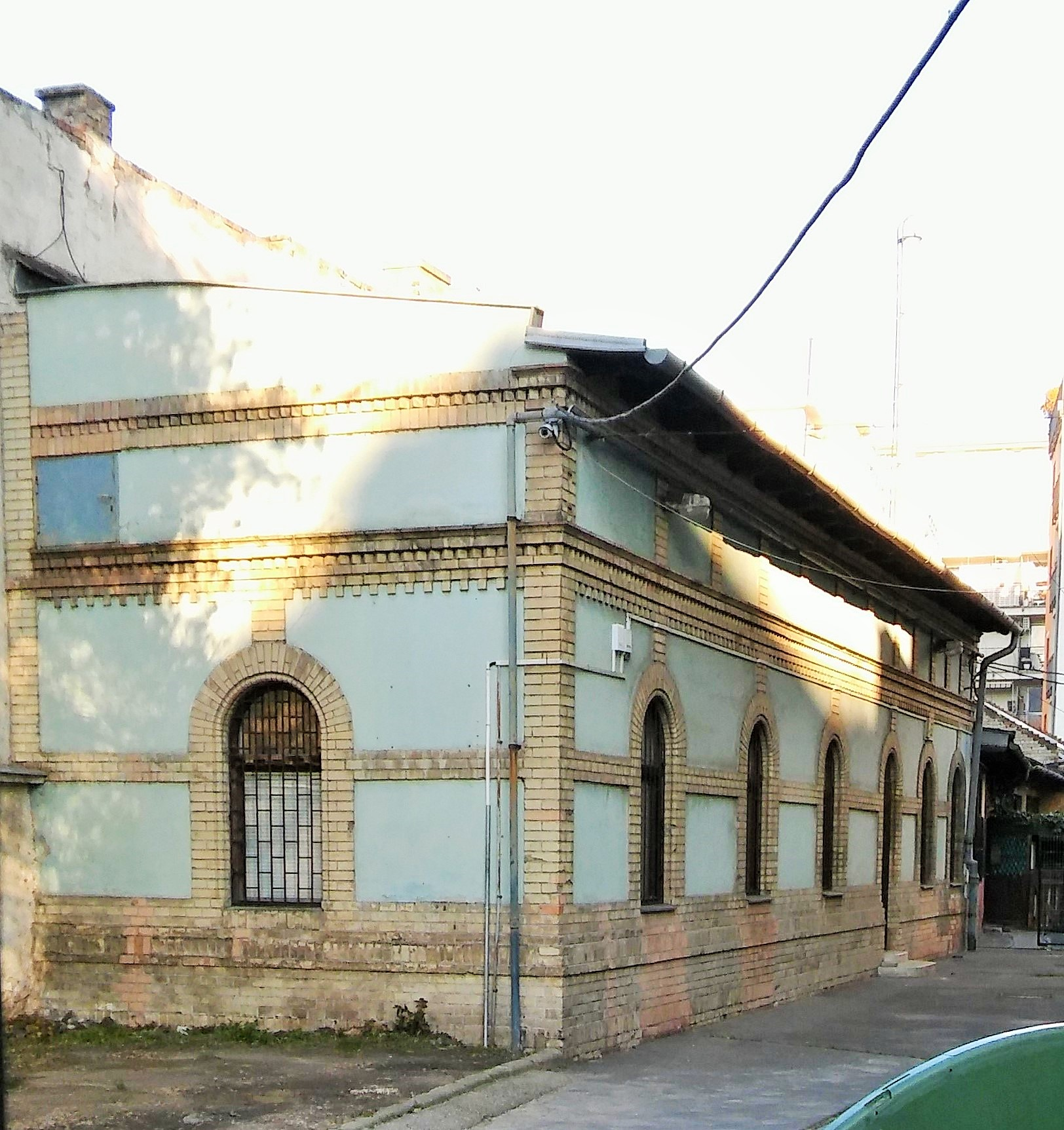

== See also ==
- History of the Jews in Hungary
- List of synagogues in Hungary
