= Esztergom Synagogue =

Former synagogue in Esztergom, Hungary

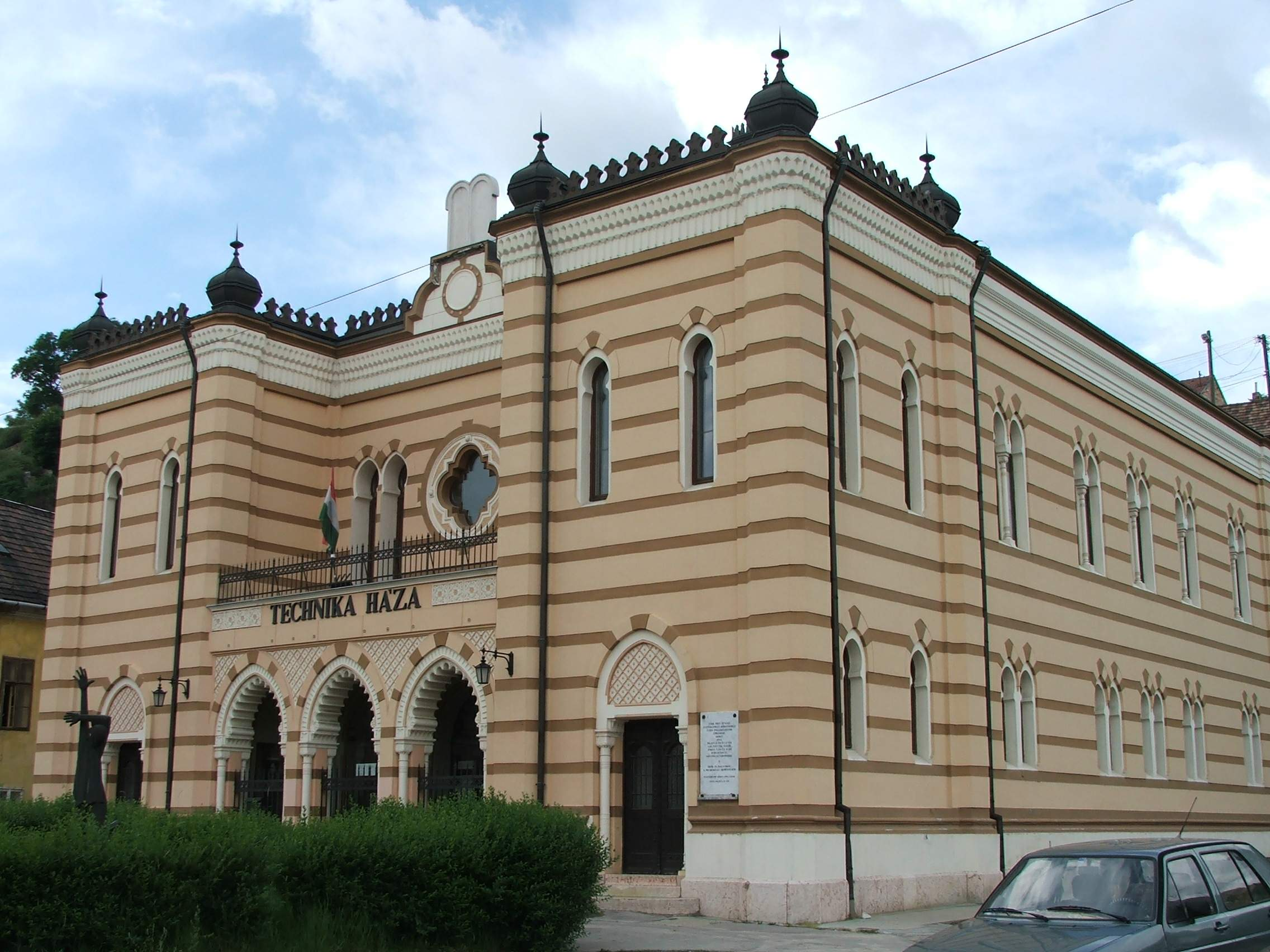
- The former synagogue in 2006

- Location of the former synagogue in Hungary

Religion
- Affiliation: Judaism (former)
- Rite: Nusach Ashkenaz
- Ecclesiastical or organizational status: Synagogue (1888–c. 1940); Profane use (1945–1964); Cultural center (since 2006)
- Status: Abandoned (as a synagogue); Repurposed

Location
- Location: Imaház u. 2, Esztergom
- Country: Hungary
- Interactive map of Esztergom Synagogue
- Coordinates: 47°47′43″N 18°44′34″E

Architecture
- Architect: Lipót Baumhorn
- Type: Synagogue architecture
- Style: Moorish Revival
- Established: 16th century (as a congregation)
- Groundbreaking: 1859
- Completed: 1888 (original use); 1964 and 2006 (renovations)
- Materials: Brick

The Esztergom Synagogue is a former Jewish congregation and synagogue, located in the town of Esztergom, Hungary. The synagogue was built in 1859, renovated in 1888, and severely damaged by a bombing during World War II. Since almost all Jewish people in the town were deported during the Holocaust and Communists subsequently gained control of the country, the building has not been used for religious purposes since the 1940s.

The synagogue continued to deteriorate until 1962, when the city council bought it from the National Office of the Hungarian Israelites, according to contemporary historian, János Németh. It was later rebuilt and inaugurated as the House of Technology (Technika Háza) on September 28, 1964. However, another source states that in 1981 it became the House of Technology after repair work was done between 1980 and 1981 that "involved a strong simplification of the exterior" and "a complete transformation of the interior." Németh claims that many government members and skilled volunteers worked to rebuild Esztergom Synagogue between 1963 and 1964. On September 28, 1964, it was inaugurated as the House of Technology and became the home of the city's Organization of Technical and Natural Science Associations (MTESZ), which was founded on the same day.

In 2006, it was bought by the municipality and used as a cultural center.

== History ==
Esztergom had been home to a large number of Jewish communities since the Árpád dynasty period. There are references to a synagogue dating from 1050.

During the Reformation, Esztergom welcomed Jewish merchants and craftsmen, who built a synagogue in the town. In 1858 a synagogue was erected on the site of today's synagogue in the former village of Szenttamás.

About thirty years later, a colleague of architect Ödön Lechner, Lipót Baumhorn, was commissioned to design a new synagogue; it was Baumhorn's first solo work. The synagogue was designed in the Moorish Revival style and was originally single-story with a gallery for the women of the congregation. It was inaugurated in 1888 by Rabbi Ignác Weisz, of Esztergom, and Rabbi Immánuel Lőw, of Szeged. During World War II, the synagogue was bombed and badly damaged. Approximately five hundred Jewish people were deported, and there has not been a significant community in the city since. The name Imaház utca (lit. "Meetinghouse street") is a reminder of the original purpose of the building.

János Németh, an historian, stated that the synagogue continued to deteriorate until 1962, when the city council bought it from the National Office of the Hungarian Israelites. It was subsequently rebuilt and inaugurated as the House of Technology on September 28, 1964. Multiple parts of the government and skilled volunteers worked to rebuild it between 1963 and 1964, and on September 28, 1964, it was inaugurated as the House of Technology (Hungarian Technika Háza), and became the home of the city's Organization of Technical and Natural Science Associations (MTESZ), which was founded on the same day.

Over the next few years, the organization continuously renovated and completely restructured the space to be able to hold conferences and lectures. It created lecture rooms, interpreting booths, rooms suitable for receptions, and district heating has been introduced. In 1996, the roof and dome shells were renovated.

Several prestigious events took place between the walls of the synagogue. Politicians often gave lectures here on their tours. In 2006, the municipality bought the House of Technology for 70 million HUF. After that, the office of the Ister-Granum Euroregion operated there for a short time, until in 2008 it moved to the building of the County Hall of Bottyán János Street.

In 2014, Hungary's Neo-Nazi political party booked the synagogue for a political rally. Citizens of Esztergom were enraged at the disrespect towards the Jewish community and asked the government to cancel the event.

== Description ==
The two-storey former synagogue building is 1,216 m^{2} (13,090 sq ft) large and contains two tower units that jut out from both sides of the façade. These are connected by a triple-arched, arcade foyer. The original 1888 marble staircase leads to a conference room upstairs with interpreting booths.

The Martyr Monument in front of the building was erected in 1985 according to the plans of István Martsa. The original 2.5 m (8 ft 2 in) bronze work was made for the monument competition in Mauthausen and was placed in the Hungarian barracks of the Auschwitz camp museum. Its pedestal is a bonfire made of railway sleepers. A plaque commemorates the abductees on the wall of the building.

== See also ==
- History of the Jews in Hungary
- List of synagogues in Hungary
