= Eger Synagogue =

Demolished synagogue in Eger, Hungary

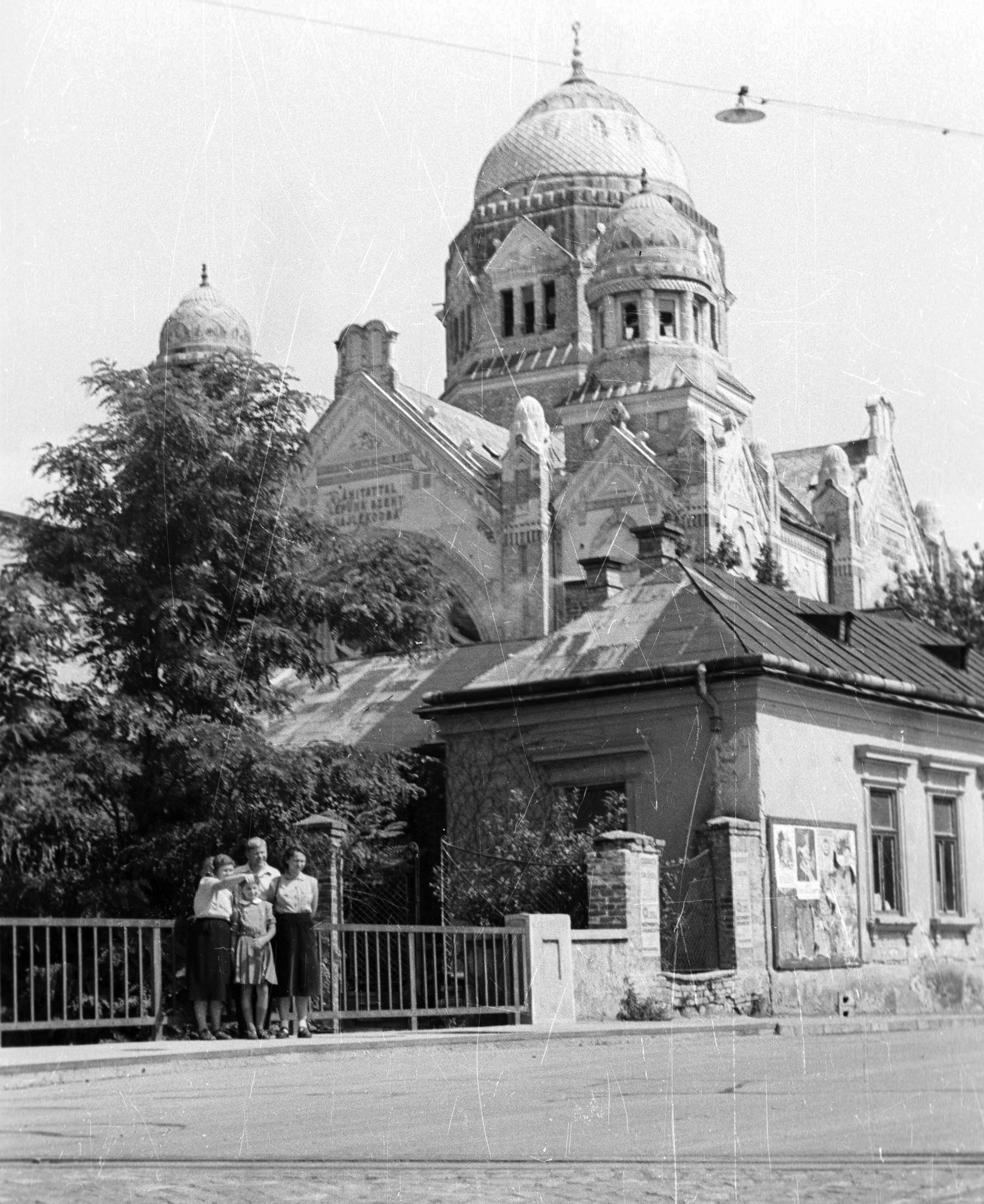
- A photograph of the former synagogue in 1954

- Location of the former synagogue in Hungary

Religion
- Affiliation: Neolog Judaism (former)
- Ecclesiastical or organizational status: Synagogue (1909–1944); Profane use (1945–1967)
- Status: Demolished

Location
- Location: Eger
- Country: Hungary
- Interactive map of Eger Synagogue
- Coordinates: 47°54′07″N 20°22′48″E

Architecture
- Architect: Lipót Baumhorn
- Type: Synagogue architecture
- Style: Eclecticism; Art Nouveau
- Completed: 1913
- Demolished: 1967
- Dome: Two (maybe more)

The Eger Synagogue is a former Neolog Jewish synagogue that was located in Eger, Hungary. Completed in 1913, the building was used a synagogue until World War II and profane use until its demolition in 1967.

== History ==
The Eger Synagogue was built between 1911 and 1913 on the corner of what is now known as Hibay Károly Street and Kossuth Lajos Street in Eger. The building was officially inaugurated on September 13, 1913. The synagogue was designed by Lipót Baumhorn, who worked in the late Eclecticism and Art Nouveau styles. The form and style were typical of Baumhorn's synagogue architecture, and it bore similarities to the Szeged New Synagogue and the Novi Sad Synagogue.

Because of the devastation of the Holocaust and World War II on the local Jewish community, the synagogue became unable to function. Following the war, the building was sold to the Eger city council, which used it as a warehouse. It was demolished in 1967 and no longer exists.

The Hotel Unicornis, named for the unicorn in the Eger coat of arms, stands on the site today.

== See also ==
- History of the Jews in Hungary
- List of synagogues in Hungary
