= Lipótváros Synagogue (Budapest) =

Proposed synagogue in Budapest, Hungary

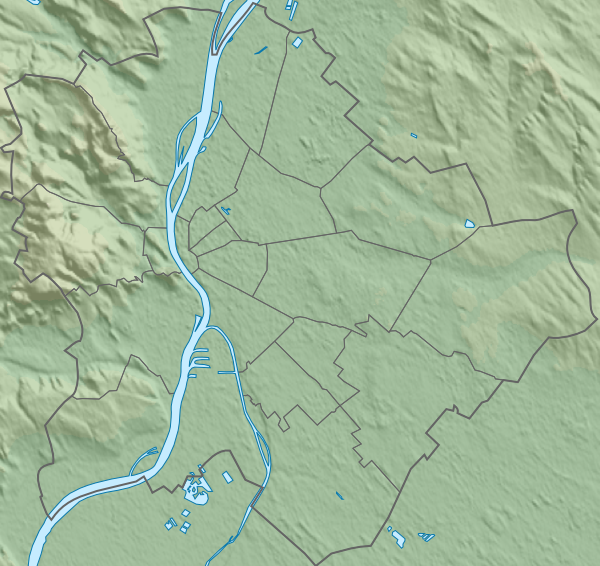
- Location of the planned synagogue in Budapest

Religion
- Affiliation: Judaism (planned)
- Ecclesiastical or organizational status: Synagogue (planned)
- Status: Never commenced

Location
- Location: Ignác Nagy Street, Lipótváros, Budapest
- Country: Hungary
- Interactive map of Lipótváros Synagogue
- Coordinates: 47°30′31″N 19°03′06″E

Architecture
- Architects: Ernő Foerk; Ferenc Schömer
- Type: Synagogue architecture
- Capacity: 3,800 worshippers (if completed)

The Lipótváros Synagogue was a planned but never realized monumental Jewish synagogue that was to be located on Ignác Nagy Street, in Lipótváros, Budapest, Hungary. It was planned to build the synagogue at the beginning of the 20th century and it would have had a capacity of 3,800 people. In the end, the building was not completed due to financial difficulties.

== History ==
=== Background ===
As a result of emancipation, the Jews of Hungary were granted a high degree of freedom in the second half of the 19th century. The number of Jews began to increase significantly, and it also played an increasingly important role in the cultural life of Budapest. Although several synagogues were built in Budapest during the 19th century, including the large Dohány Street Synagogue, they could no longer perform the functions believed necessary in Budapest, and were not at all prominent, and most were surrounded by other buildings.

Lipótváros Jewry at that time was 12,000 people, the neighboring VI. and VII. and the district had 72,000 people. In 1893, the Jewish community of Pest made a request to the leadership of the capital:

“When the community wishes to fill a generally felt gap in its institutions of worship, it must be borne in mind that the church it is to build must not only be able to accommodate as many Jewish believers as possible on a permanent basis, but also to the capital and the capital. be a monumental building worthy of its dignity.”

The capital of the church to be built designated the plot surrounded by Szalay, Szemere, Markó and Koháry (today Ignác Nagy) streets and gave it to the community free of charge.

=== Tender and plans ===
An invitation to tender was issued on 20 February 1898, with the proviso that:

- the building must be free standing
- it must be able to accommodate 3,600 people (compared to 2,964 seats in the Dohány Street Synagogue)
- the maximum cost of its preparation is HUF 1,000,000.

The tender call received 23 applications, which were judged in less than a month by a panel chaired by Zsigmond Kohner, president of the community, which also included renowned architects of the time. Plans were submitted by Ernő Foerk and Ferenc Schömer, Zoltán Bálint and Lajos Jámbor, Béla Lajta, Albert Schikedanz and Fülöp Herzog, Géza Márkus, József Vágó, László Vágó, and Izidor Scheer, with Scheer also submitting a plan with Manó Pollák. Plans were also submitted by Aladár Kármán and Gyula Ullmann and Henri Evers.

Foerk and Schömer submitted the winning design.

=== Winning design concept ===
The design by Foerk and Schömer would probably have been the largest synagogue in the world. The Emánu-Él Synagogue in New York, whilst even larger than the Dohány Street Synagogue, seated 2,500 people and is 31 metres (103 ft) high. Foerk's plan estimated a capacity of 3,800, with a height of 70 m (230 ft). The planned synagogue would have been lower than the nearby 96 m (315 ft) high St. Stephen's Basilica and the also 96 m (315 ft) high Hungarian Parliament Building' however, it would have been barely lower than the Rózsák tér church at 76 m (249 ft), or the Matthias Church at 78 m (256 ft), and would have been higher than the 67 m high (220 ft) Bakács Square Church.

However, Foerk and Schömer's plans far exceeded the maximum construction costs with the planned dome alone estimated to cost HUF 6,000,000. Foerk and Schömer subsequently submitted new plans, but they did not reach the appropriate level of budgeted costs.

=== Cessation ===
After lengthy planning in 1907, the community dr. Fülöp Weinmann (1839–1911), a court councilor and a new president of the community, rejected further plans and replaced the Ignác Nagy Street plot with another plot next to the Dohány Street Synagogue, where the Temple of the Heroes was later built.
