= Makó =

Town in Csongrád County, Hungary

- Town
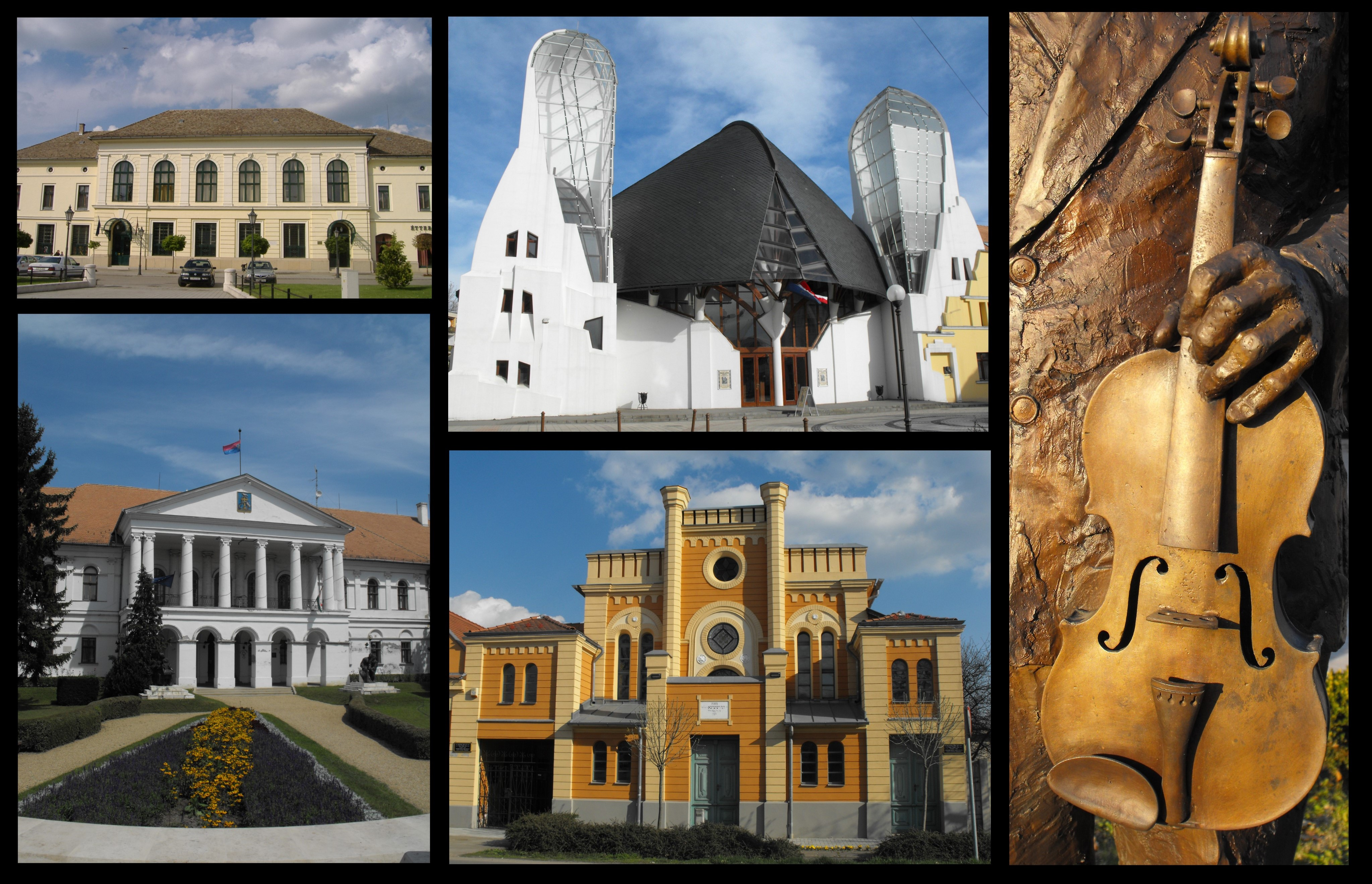
- Montage including images of downtown Makó

- Flag Coat of arms
- Nicknames: The Capital of Onion, Constantinople of the Maros, Town of Flowers
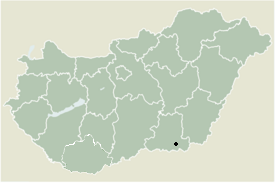
- Location in Csongrád County, Hungary

- Location in Csongrád County, Hungary Location in Hungary
- Coordinates: 46.217°N 20.483°E
- Country: Hungary
- County: Csongrád
- District: Makó
- Settled: 895
- Founded: 1299
- Founder: Andrew III of Hungary
- Named for: General Makó

Government
  - Type: Mayor-Council
  - Mayor: Éva Erzsébet Farkas (Fidesz-KDNP)

Area
  - Total: 229.23 km^{2} (88.51 sq mi)

Population (1 January 2011)
  - Total: 21,913
  - Density: 99.23/km^{2} (257.0/sq mi)
- Demonym: Makovian
- Time zone: UTC+1 (CET)
  - Summer (DST): UTC+2 (CEST)
- Postal code: 6900
- Area code: (+36) 62
- Website: mako.hu

Makó ([ˈmɒkoː], German: Makowa, Yiddish: מאַקאָווע Makowe, Romanian: Macău or Macovia, Slovak: Makov) is a town in Csongrád County, in southeastern Hungary, 10 km (6 mi) from the Romanian border. It lies on the Maros River. Makó is home to 21,913 people and it has an area of 229.23 square kilometres (88.51 square miles), of which 196.8 km^{2} (76.0 sq mi) is arable land. Makó is the fourth-largest town in Csongrád County after Szeged, Hódmezővásárhely and Szentes. The town is 28.6 km (17.8 mi) from Hódmezővásárhely, 36.2 km (22.5 mi) from Szeged, 75.4 km (46.9 mi) from Arad, 85 km (52.8 mi) from Gyula, 93.5 km (58.1 mi) from Timișoara (Temesvár), and 200 km (124 mi) from Budapest.

The climate is warmer than anywhere else in Hungary, with hot, dry summers. The town is noted for its onion which is a hungarikum, the spa and the thermal bath. The Makó International Onion Festival, the largest of its kind, is held annually. Makó is a popular tourist destination in Hungary.

The Makó gas field, located near the town, is the largest natural gas field in Central Europe. The gas volume is more than 600 billion cubic metres (21 trillion cubic feet), according to a report by the Scotia Group.

The town's floodplain forests are protected as part of Körös-Maros National Park.

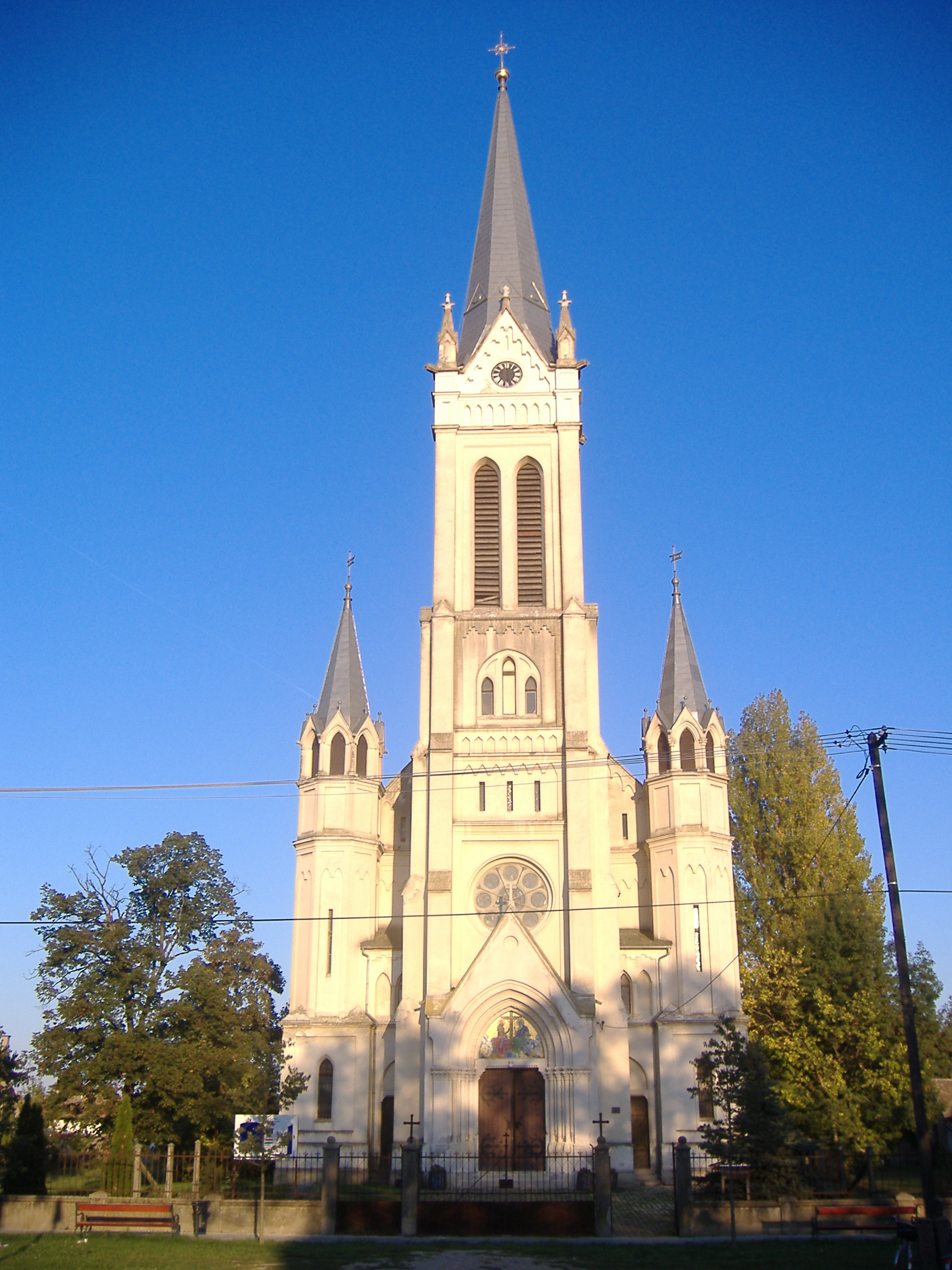
Catholic Church in Makó

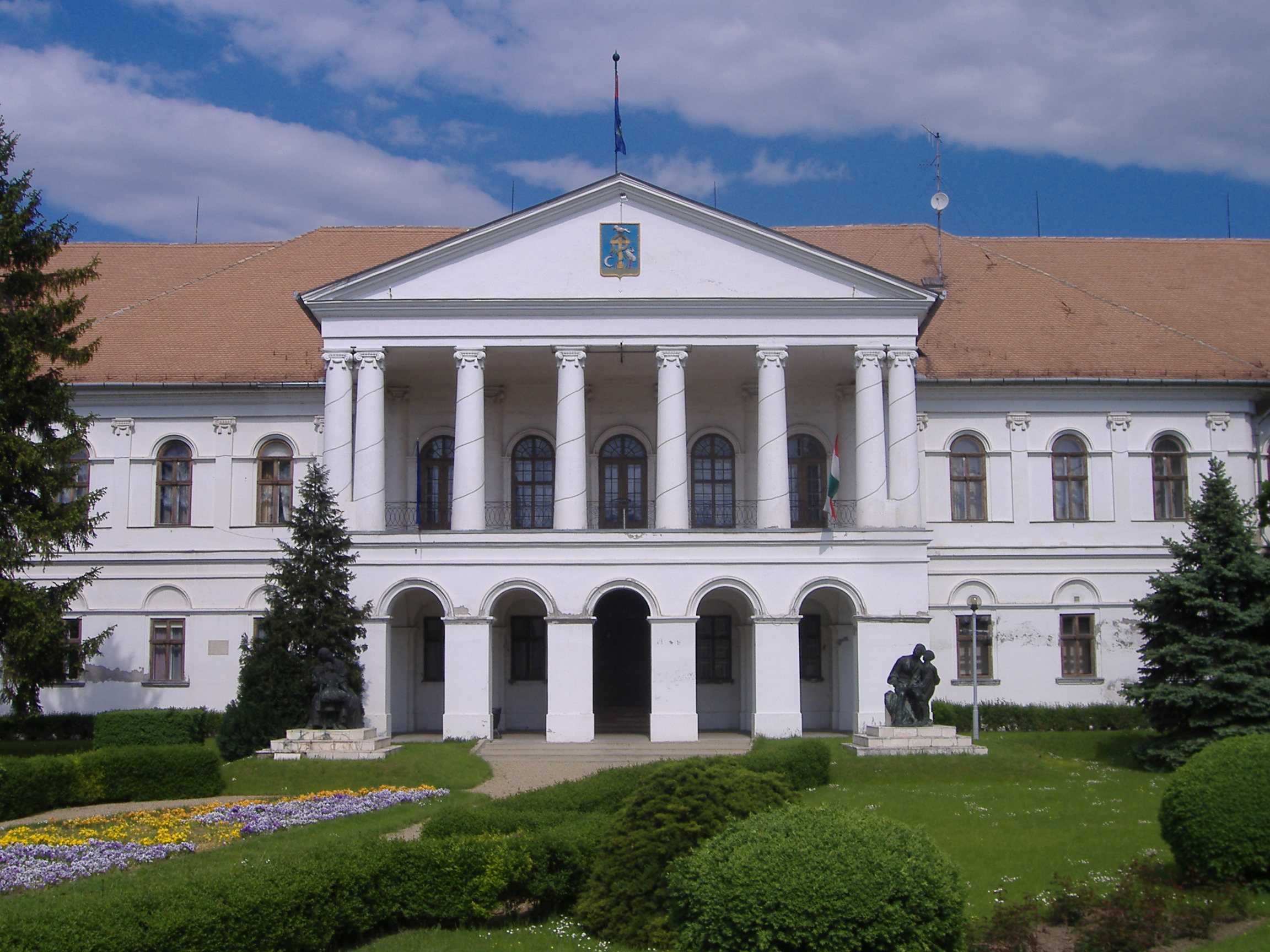
Town Hall in Makó

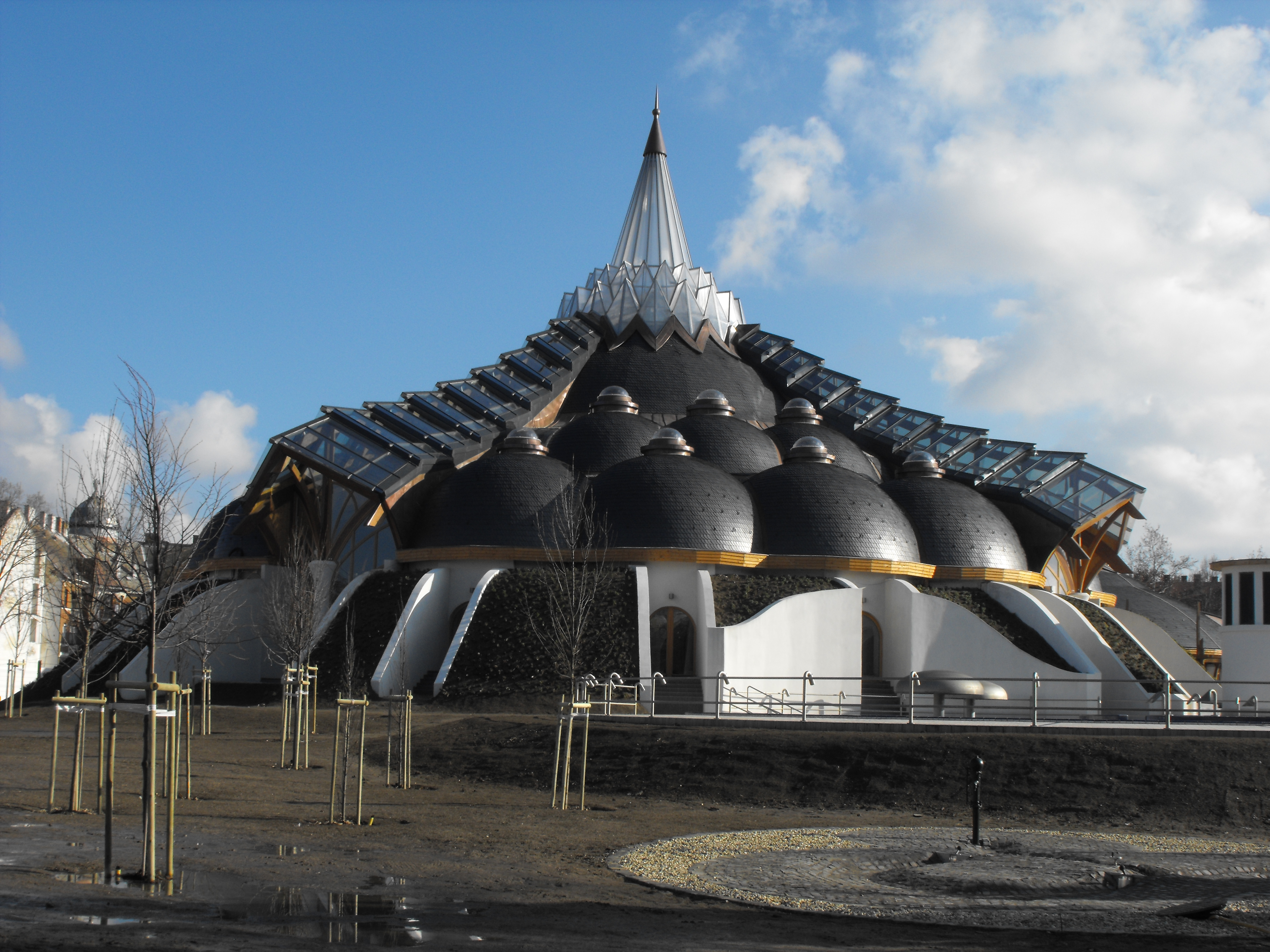
'Hagymatikum': Thermal Bath of Makó

== Economy ==
The economy is based on agriculture. The town is noted for its production of onions and garlic. Both the climate and the soil structure make the town and its surroundings an ideal place for onion farming. Onions have been cultivated in the region since the 16th century. The first records of significant garlic production date to the late 18th century. International recognition of the garlic grown in Makó has been widespread since the Vienna Expo in 1873 and the Brussels Expo in 1888.

The mud of the Maros River has similar properties to some of the best in Hungary and the world; at times it is likened to that of the Dead Sea. The local spa has been one of the main tourist attractions since 1961.

With the political changes in 1989, after the break-up of the Soviet Union, Makó lost jobs in industry. Unemployment has risen in the area, to an estimated 8% in the early 21st century, and is considered a serious issue. Farmers have also suffered more economic difficulties. The town has established an industrial park to encourage that development, and the town hopes to build on its site as "The South-Eastern Gate of the European Union".

Makó has become known in the early 21st century for the nearby Makó Trough, a basin-centered gas accumulation that could be one of the largest natural gas fields in continental Europe. As of March 2007, it was not clear whether the gas can be recovered economically from this area. At the 90% probability rate, Makó had certified recoverable resources of over 600 billion cubic meters of natural gas, according to a report by the Scotia Group. This was prepared for the field's exploration concession holder, the Canada-based Falcon Oil and Gas.

== History ==
Makó used to be the capital of Csanád, a historic administrative county (comitatus) of the Kingdom of Hungary.

Many notable Hungarian people were born or have lived in Makó. Perhaps the most prominent is the American publisher and journalist, Joseph Pulitzer, who was born to a Jewish family here on April 18, 1847. Emigrating to the United States when young, he developed as a publisher, owning and operating two newspapers in the United States: in Saint Louis, Missouri and New York City; bequeathed funds to Columbia University to establish its school of journalism, and endowed the Pulitzer Prizes in journalism and photography, as well as literature, art and music.

=== Jewish history ===
Makó developed a Jewish community beginning in the 18th century. The Orthodox synagogue was reconstructed during the years 1999-2002 and reopened on 10 March 2002.

Jews began to settle in Makó about the middle of the 18th century, under the protection of Stanislavich, the Bishop of Csanád. In 1740, he assigned a special quarter where they soon formed a community, and by 1747 had established a Chevra kadisha.

The first rabbi of Makó was Judah ben Abraham ha-Levi (who occupied the rabbinate from 1778 to 1824). He was succeeded by Salomon Ullman (1826–63). Ullman wrote a commentary on certain sections of Yoreh De'ah, under the title "Yeri'ot Shelomoh" (Vienna, 1854). He was followed by Anton Enoch Fischer (1864–96), former rabbi of Dunaföldvár. Fischer introduced German and (later) Hungarian in his sermons, when the community still spoke mostly Yiddish.
In 1904 the rabbi was Dr. A. Kecskemeti".

The community established a Jewish school in Makó in 1851, of which Marcus Steinhardt was a teacher for forty years. The community also set up a Jewish Women's Association, a Jewish students' aid society, and a Jewish women's lying-in hospital.

In 1900, Makó had 1,642 Jews, less than 5% of the total city population of 33,722. The community was destroyed during the Holocaust. The Jewish population was deported to extermination camps, where most were killed in the last year of the war.

== Geography ==
The former community pasture of the town near the Maros River has been preserved as part of the Körös-Maros National Park. The traditional name of the area, Csordajárás, expresses its historic use as grazing ground for cattle.

=== Climate ===
Makó and the surrounding region get the most sunshine in Hungary, about 85-90 sunny days a year. The sun shines more than 2,100 hours a year in Makó. The climate is relatively dry, especially in the summer, with the 100-year average of precipitation recorded at 585 millimetres (23.0 in) per year. The average medium temperature is 10.9 °C (51.6 °F).

== Notable residents and natives ==
=== Politics ===
- Lajos Návay (1870–1919), jurist, politician, Speaker of the House of Representatives (1911–1912)
- Andrea Mágori, politician
- Béla Bánhidy, politician
- László Szászfalvi, politician
- Ferenc Erdei, politician
- József Kristóffy, politician, Interior Minister (1905–1906)

=== Science ===
- Geza de Kaplany, physician
- Béla H. Bánáthy (1919–2003), Hungarian-American linguist, systems scientist, educator, founder of White Stag Leadership Development Program in California
- József Galamb (1881–1955), Hungarian-American engineer
- Peter Lantos (born 1939), medical scientist and writer
- Moritz Löw (1841–1900, Steglitz, Berlin), Jewish Hungarian-German astronomer

=== Religion ===
- Géza Vermes (born 1924-2013), Jewish theologian, orientalist
- Meshulim Feish Lowy, Grand Rebbe of the Tosh Hasidic dynasty
- Vasile Erdeli, Romanian bishop of the Diocese of Oradea Mare (1843–1862)
- Sándor Rosenberg, neolog rabbi

=== Media/Art/Entertainment ===
- Tamás Kátai (born 1975), musician
- Antal Páger (1899–1986), actor
- Katalin Berek (1930–2017), actress
- István Dégi (1935–1992), actor
- Bea Palya (born 1976), singer
- Joseph Pulitzer (1847–1911), Hungarian-American journalist, publisher and philanthropist
- Albert Pulitzer (1851–1909), Hungarian-American journalist, teacher
- Andre de Toth (1912–2002), Hungarian-American film director and producer
- Emil Makai (1871–1901, Budapest), Hungarian poet
- Jenő Barcsay, painter

=== Sports ===
- József Sütő, long-distance runner
- Marko Milošević, Bosnian footballer, football manager
- Gábor Gyömbér, footballer
- Zsolt Gévay, footballer
- Krisztina Pigniczki, handballer
- Zsolt Huszárik, footballer
- Tamás Szélpál, footballer
- András Dlusztus, footballer
- László Köteles, footballer

== Twin towns – sister cities ==
Makó is twinned with:

- Ada, Serbia
- Atça (Sultanhisar), Turkey
- Bodo (Balinț), Romania
- Dumbrava, Romania
- Jasło, Poland
- Kiryat Yam, Israel
- Lugoj, Romania
- Martinsicuro, Italy
- Maumee, United States
- Miercurea Ciuc, Romania
- Radomsko, Poland
- Rusko Selo (Kikinda), Serbia
- Sânnicolau Mare, Romania
- Xinyang, China
- Želiezovce, Slovakia

== See also ==
- Downtown Primary School, Elementary Arts Educational Institution and Logopedical Institute
