= Andrea Mágori =

Hungarian politician

Member of the National Assembly
- In office 14 May 2010 – 5 May 2014

Personal details
- Born: 1 May 1952 (age 73) Makó, Hungary
- Party: Fidesz
- Profession: teacher, politician

Andrea Mágori or Mrs. József Mágori (née Balogi; born 1 May 1952) is a Hungarian politician, member of the National Assembly (MP) for Makó (Csongrád County Constituency VII) from 2010 to 2014. She was a member of the Committee on Consumer Protection from 14 May 2010 to 5 May 2014, and Committee on Agriculture from 23 September 2013 to 5 May 2014.
