= Moritz Löw =

Hungarian astronomer

Moritz Löw, astronomer; born at Makó, Hungary, in 1841; died in Steglitz, Berlin, May 25, 1900; studied at the universities of Leipzig and Vienna, and received his Ph.D. degree from the University of Budapest (1867). After graduating he became an assistant at the Leipzig observatory, and in 1883 was appointed section chief in the Prussian geodetic institute at Berlin, with the title of professor.

Löw's principal works are: Elemente der Planeten; Einfluss der Verbesserten Sternörter auf die Polhöhen der Gradmessung in Ostpreussen; Polhöhe von Helgoland; Zur Theorie der Passage-Instrumente im Ersten Vertikal; Astronomisch-Geodätische Ortsbestimmungen im Harz; and Polhöhebestimmungen im Harzgebirge Ausgeführt 1887-91.
