= Jenő Barcsay =

Hungarian painter (1900–1988)

Jenő Barcsay

Jenő Barcsay (14 January 1900 – 2 April 1988) was a Hungarian painter with Armenian ancestry.

== His life ==
Born in Katona, Hungary in 1900. On his mother's side, he is a descendant of the noble Armenian Kápdebó family from Transylvania. His mother, Irén Kápdebó, gave birth to ten children, six of them passed away in a very young age. His younger brother, a doctor, died of pneumonia at the age of 24. Although he was a late descendant of a Transylvanian noble family, he grew up in poverty. His father (notary Boldizsár Barcsay) and one of his sisters suffered from mental illness, and his father later committed suicide.

His father wanted to turn him into a military officer, but he himself preferred to become a musician, taking piano lessons in Marosvásárhely. In the meantime, he was a private tutor in Nyárádszentandrás and obtained a teacher's and cantor's certificate. His painting talent was discovered by teacher Károly Gulyás, who recommended him to Sándor Illyés Soófalvy. The rich Transylvanian gentleman undertook the costs of his education in Budapest, but could only support him for one year, because he lost his fortune in the economic crisis after World War I.

In 1918, Barcsay was drafted to the army, but he was discharged due to pneumonia.

In 1919, he went to Budapest to begin his studies in the Fine Art School and graduated in 1924. In 1923 they worked in Gyöngyös; where he created his picture called A falu bolondja (The Village Fool) which actually initiated him as a painter: that's when he felt the space depicted on the plane, the third dimension combined with the representation of the soul and inner content. After he graduated he stayed at the college as an artist student for two years. During his studies, he had serious financial problems, he was poor, so much so that he hid himself in a room at the school together with several of his friends. His first master was János Vaszary.

In 1925, he made the etching, the Fiúfej (Boy's Head), which even before the Parisian influences, but already instinctively, with almost cubist tools, breaks down the form, the human face, into planes, and these planes meet in a sharp cut in the portrait.

The summer of 1926 was spent in Makó and Hódmezővásárhely, where he worked on the constructive structural powers in landscapes. The same year he traveled to Paris with a two-year state scholarship. He was discouraged by the modern kitsch he saw in galleries and coffee houses, and his lack of language skills also made his integration difficult. However this was where he discovered the works of Cézanne. His paintings greatly influenced the young artist.

Due to the serious illness and death of his younger brother, he traveled home from Paris, then returned, but could no longer find his place, so he spent the second half of the scholarship period (1929-30) in Italian cities - Perugia, Rome, Assisi and Florence. Here he consciously studied and trained himself, and this trip enriched him with life-long experiences, which he later used in his paintings in the mid-fifties. He always emphasized that he was close to Latin expressionism, not to the German.

While in Italy in 1927, Barcsay learned about the Quattrocento movement of the early Renaissance, particularly the anatomical studies of the period. He became a resident of Szentendre after many visits and embarked on another fellowship to Paris in 1929 to understand the rules of cubism.

He made his first painting with a characteristically individual style, The Working Girl, in 1928, even before his period in Szentendre. In 1929, he joined the Society of Szentendre Painters, founded that year. Although he was not a founding member, from then on he regularly spent his summers in the small town on the Danube, initially in the artist colony, later in his house on Zenta street (his statue can still be seen there, with his characteristic cane). Here he made friends with Jeno Paizs Goebel, whom he soon lost (he died of a brain tumor during World War II).

From 1931 to 1945, he taught accounting, mathematics, mechanics and literature at the Municipal Apprentice School in the capital to bakers, hairdressers, mechanical technicians, etc. for students. He was able to make himself independent from his earnings, he was not forced to paint kitsch.

In 1945, on the recommendation of Emil Krocsák, Szőnyi invited him to the Academy of Fine Arts, where he became a professor of anatomy and visual appearance. The highly respected, aging master, who also drew intensively as a teacher in order to improve his knowledge, was confidentially called only Nyenyo by his students and colleagues. He remained a teacher at the college until his retirement, and after his death one of the halls of the institution was named after him.

Anatomy for the Artist Book Includes detailed drawings of the human body for the fine artist in 142 full page plates. These drawings include bones, muscles, and joints.

Barcsay died in Budapest in 1988. After his death one of the halls of the Fine Art School was named after him.
