= Makó gas field =

Natural gas field in Hungary

- Location within Hungary
- Country: Hungary
- Offshore/onshore: Onshore
- Coordinates: 46°12′54″N 20°28′32″E
- Partner: Falcon Oil & Gas

Field history
- Discovery: 1960s
- Start of production: 2006

Production
- Current production of gas: 1×10^{9} m^{3}/a (35×10^{9} cu ft/a)
- Recoverable gas: 1,550×10^{9} m^{3} (55×10^{12} cu ft)

The Makó gas field (Makó Trough of the Pannonian Basin Gas Accumulation) is a large natural gas field next to Makó, in southeastern Hungary.

== Formation ==
The worldwide interest in unconventional hydrocarbon accumulations has increased continuously because of a growing demand for natural gas and the availability of a growing range of advanced oilfield technologies. For these reasons, the thermally mature, shaly sediments of the deep Makó Trough of the Pannonian Basin have become a new target for exploration companies looking for unconventional natural gas resources.

== Research ==
Since the 1960s it was well known that a large gas field existed next to Makó. The disadvantages are the depth of the gas deposit at about 5,000 metres (16,000 ft) as well as the very high pressures and temperatures, the large thermal increase with depth in Hungary about 20 metres (66 ft) per degree Celsius compared to a world-average 50 metres (160 ft) per degree Celsius).

In the late 1980s, the World Bank funded a deep drilling program in Hungary, led by the American Geological Survey. An American geologist, John Gustavson, noted in the survey data that he obtained a research permit in 1998 for part of the Makó Trough. Later Marc A. Bruner bought the concession from him, who founded the Canadian-based Falcon Oil & Gas Ltd.

At the 90% probability rate, Makó had certified recoverable resources of over 600 billion cubic metres (21 trillion cubic feet) of natural gas, according to a report by the Scotia Group, prepared for the field's exploration concession holder, the Falcon Oil and Gas. Later estimates rose to about 1,550 billion cubic metres (55 trillion cubic feet) of natural gas.

== Upstream ==
In 2005, Falcon Oil & Gas bought the extraction rights from the Hungarian state for 40 years. It started test extractions in 2006 with 327 barrels (52.0 m^{3}) of light crude oil and 110,000 cubic metres (3,900,000 cu ft) of natural gas daily. In April 2008, Falcon Oil & Gas signed a $300 million upstream contract with ExxonMobill, which announced a few days later that it had signed another agreement with MOL to conduct research in the Makó area. So MOL has also partnered with ExxonMobil in the South Hungarian upstream activity.

In 2009, the Makó M-7 well in the Makó Trough was considered the deepest drill in Hungary to date, with a depth of 6085 meters. The drilling stopped in the rocks of the crystalline substrate.

In February 2010, ExxonMobil as well as MOL gave up the project due to the high costs of possible extraction.

The exploration of the Makó unconventional natural gas field caused huge costs for Falcon's interest: the 2010 balance sheet posted a loss of $100 million and the 2011 a loss of $32 million. The loss was borne by TXM Oil and Gas Research, Inc., owned by Mako Energy Corporation, a Delaware State (USA) subsidiary of Falcon Oil & Gas Ltd., Canada.

== Continuity ==
In 2011 the Hungarian Geological Society stated in its detailed study the estimated mean volume of gas generated as 490–650 billion cubic metres (17–23 trillion cubic feet) . It was told not enough to justify the existence of a basin centred gas accumulation. Therefore the Makó Trough is unlikely to contain a large basin centred, tight gas-sand accumulation.

Nonetheless, Falcon Oil & Gas believes in the prospect of extra-long-term thinking and is pursuing the currently unprofitable shale gas exploration process and would like to see the Hungarian state as an entrepreneur.
