= Downtown Primary School, Elementary Arts Educational Institution and Logopedical Institute =

School in Makó, Hungary

The Downtown Primary School, Elementary Arts Educational Institution and Logopedical Institute (Hungarian: Belvárosi Általános Iskola, Alapfokú Művészetoktatási Intézmény és Logopédiai Intézet, also informally referred to as Kálvin or Belvárosi) is a state school in Hungary. It is located in Csongrád-Csanád County in the city of Makó. The Latin motto of the school is "Docendo discimus," meaning "We learn by the way of teaching" (Hungarian: Tanítva tanulunk).

== History ==
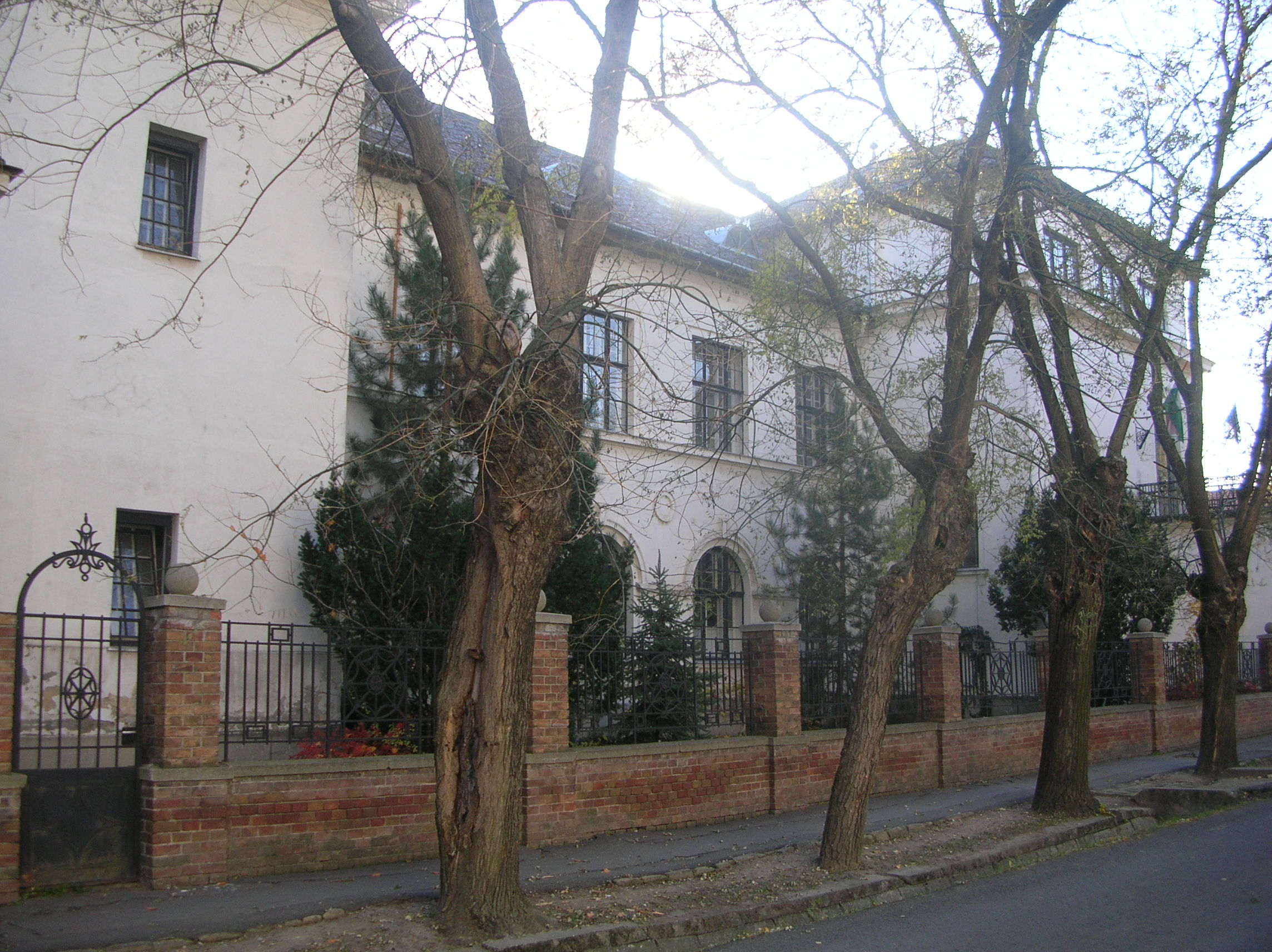
The old building's flower garden

The original institution of the school was founded by István Szegedi Kis in 1545. During the Ottoman invasion of Hungary in the 16th century, the Protestant church used the school to provide congregations with pastors and teachers. In 1686, the school was burned down while the Ottomans were burning the city.

The school was eventually rebuilt in 1713 as a state school. In 1812, it became the "Great School" (Hungarian: Nagy Oskola). Later, during the time of the Hungarian Soviet Republic, the school's name was Béla Kun Primary School. After the end of the Soviet Republic, the school changed its name back to Kálvin Street Primary School which became its name until the school merged with the Béla Bartók School.

== Coat of arms ==
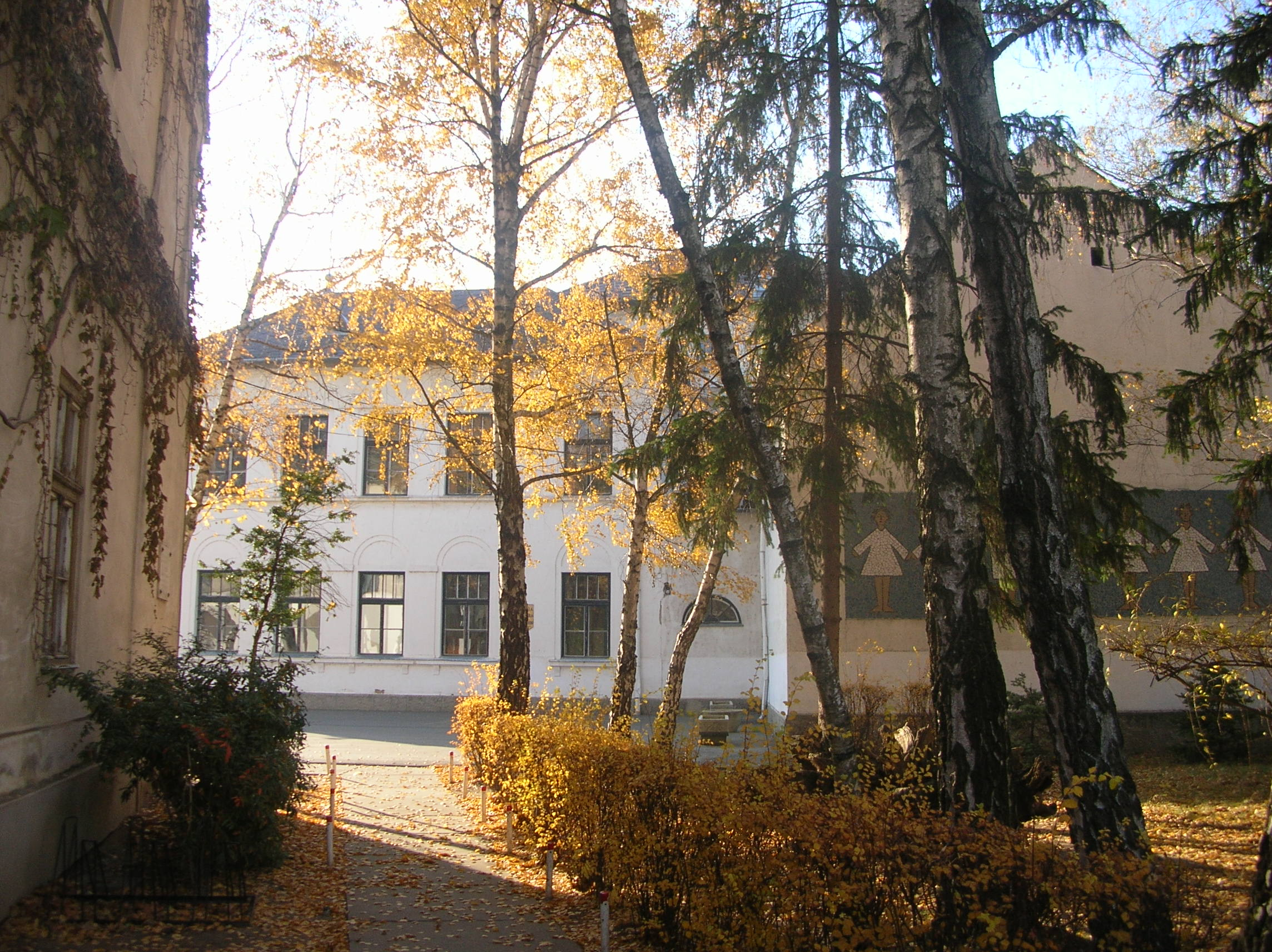
A small garden

The school's coat of arms depict the school's numerous values and subjects. Its owl refers to wisdom and knowledge. Its three lyres symbolize an arts educations. Its three shells refer to mathematics. Its compass means to point in the right way toward life and knowledge. Its torch represents reunion and wisdom. Together, the torch and compass also imply the theses of Comenius. The coat of arms' red and blue color is drawn from Makó's own flag colors.

== Parts of the school ==
=== Kálvin building ===
The old building

The biggest unit of the school is the building complex on Kálvin Square next to the Calvinist church. It's a mixed complex containing various building styles from what remains of the Owl Castle along with newer, more modern parts.

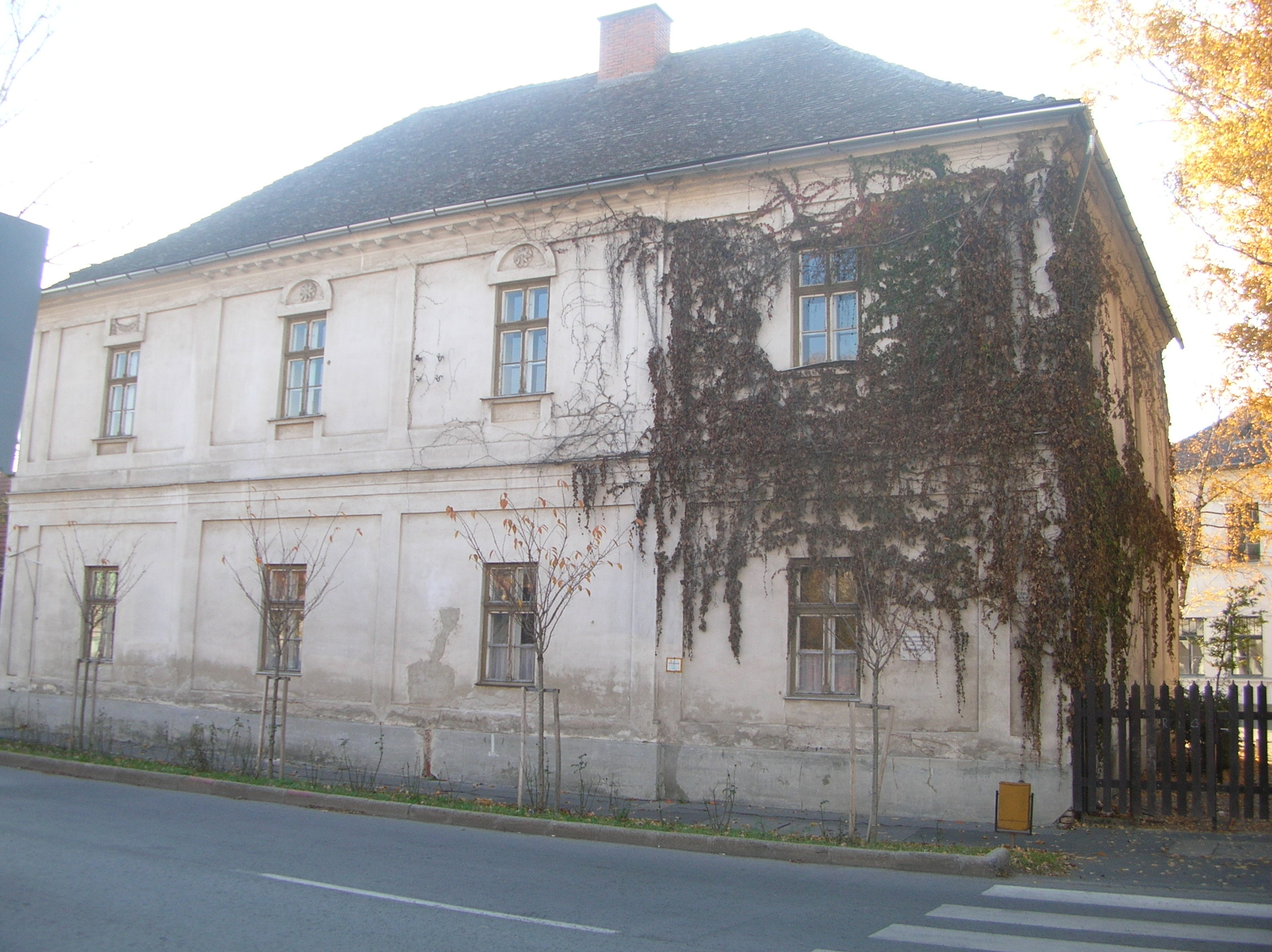
The Owl Castle

The oldest unit is on Owl Castle (Bagolyvár). Makó's oldest tiered building at over a hundred years old, it was built with an Early Classicism style with a cellar and attic. In the building are foreign language classrooms (English, German), religious study-circles, and other afternoon activities. Rooms include student and teacher dining halls, as well as a kitchen.

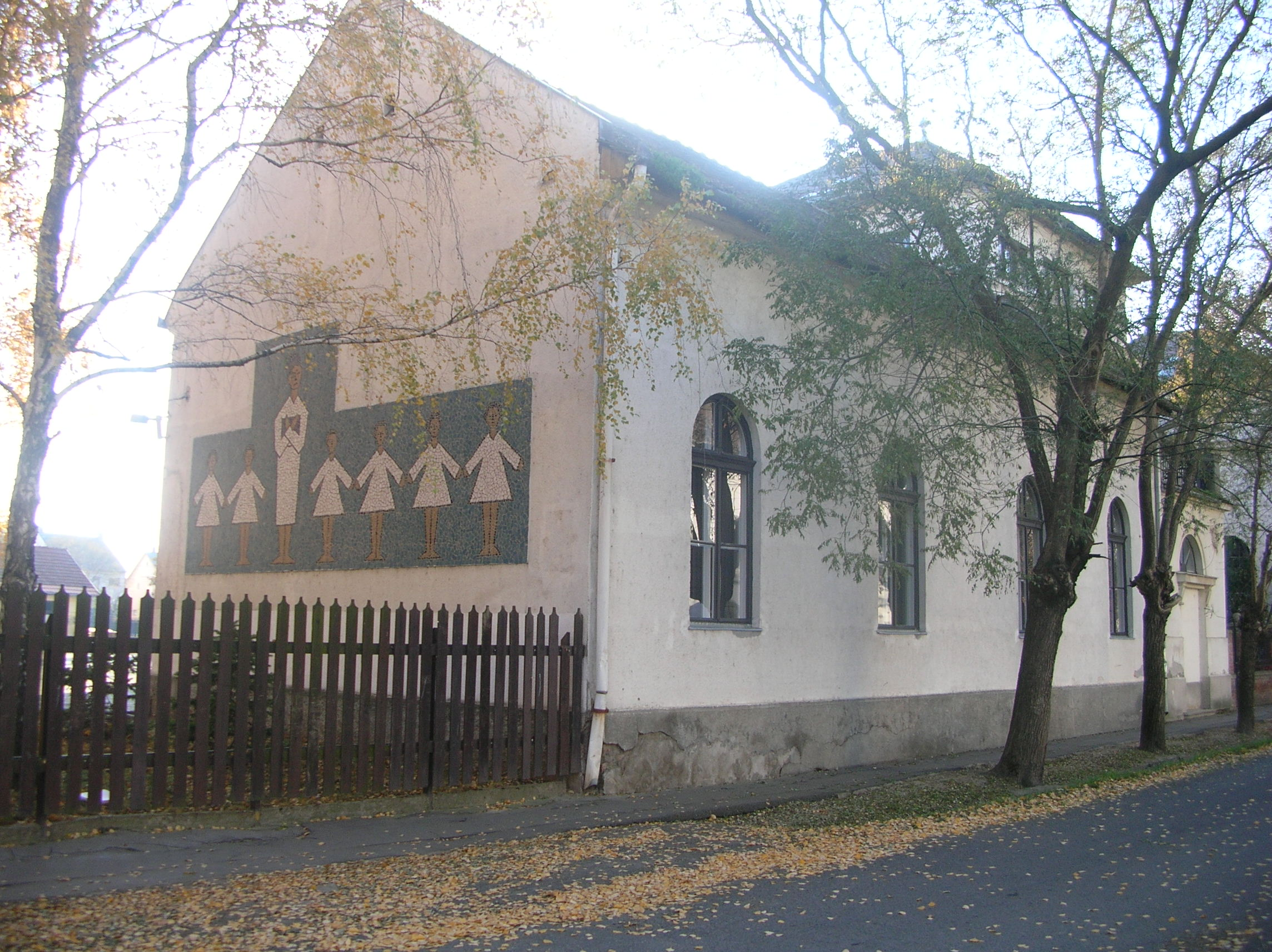
The small gym

The "old building" is about 80 years old. It includes classrooms for subjects like mathematics and informatics, a library, a teacher's room, and a music room. In 2006, the building was modernized with projectors.

The newest unit was built in 1982. It features classrooms for lower grades, as well as two gyms, a sports field, a running field, and two jumping fields that were rebuilt in 2005.

=== Bartók building ===
In 1997, the Bartók building became the part of the school as an elementary arts educational institution. Originally, it had been built in 1880 as a civilian girl primary school, after which it took the name of Szeged Street Primary School. That was an important point, when in 1958 Dénes Bolaman's wife music teacher founded the first music class, what characterize the school nowadays too.

Upon its incorporation, the Bartók building became the second largest complex in the state school. It includes a library, classrooms, music rooms, a dining room, and other purposed rooms. It also features a gym, a football field, and a sand pit. The Bartók building is intended as the state school's place for cultural life and celebration.

=== Member institutes ===
In 2005, many other schools in the state school's vicinity became instituted under its name. With the incorporation of the Ferencszállás, Királyhegyes, and Klárafalva schools, it became one of the largest state schools in the regions.

== Notable alumni ==
- Miklós Szirbik
- István Tömörkény
- Ferenc Erdei
