= Joseph Pulitzer =

Hungarian-American newspaper publisher (1847–1911)

- Portrait by Benjamin Falk c. 1884

Member of the U.S. House of Representatives from New York's 9th district
- In office March 4, 1885 – April 10, 1886
- Preceded by: John Hardy
- Succeeded by: Samuel Cox

Member of the Missouri House of Representatives from the 5th St. Louis district
- In office January 5, 1870 – March 24, 1870
- Preceded by: John Terry
- Succeeded by: Nicholas M. Bell

Personal details
- Born: Pulitzer József; April 10, 1847 Makó, Kingdom of Hungary
- Died: October 29, 1911 (aged 64) Charleston, South Carolina, U.S.
- Citizenship: Hungary; United States
- Party: Republican (1870); Liberal Republican (1870–74); Democratic (1874–1911)
- Spouse: Katherine "Kate" Davis (m. 1878)
- Children: 7
- Occupation: Publisher, philanthropist, journalist, lawyer, politician
- Net worth: US$30.6 million at the time of his death (about 0.09% of US GNP)

Military service
- Allegiance: United States of America
- Branch/service: Union Army
- Years of service: 1864–1865
- Unit: 1st New York Cavalry Regiment
- Battles/wars: American Civil War; Battle of Dinwiddie Court House; Battle of Five Forks; Third Battle of Petersburg; Battle of Sailor's Creek; Battle of Appomattox Station; Battle of Appomattox Court House

Joseph Pulitzer (/ˈpʊlɪtsər/ PULL-it-sər; (Note: The more anglicized pronunciation /ˈpjuːlɪtsər/ PEW-lit-sər is common but widely considered incorrect. Michael Pulitzer, Joseph's grandson, explained in 1991, "I find the easiest way to explain the proper pronunciation is to tell people to utter the three simple English words, 'PULL-it-sir,' with the accent on the 'pull.' Technically, the 's' of 'sir' should be pronounced as 'z'.") born Pulitzer József, Hungarian: [ˈpulit͡sɛr ˈjoːʒɛf]; April 10, 1847 – October 29, 1911) was a Hungarian-American politician and a newspaper publisher of the St. Louis Post-Dispatch and the New York World. He became a leading national figure in the U.S. Democratic Party and served one term representing New York's 9th congressional district.

In the 1890s, the fierce competition between his World and William Randolph Hearst's New York Journal led both to develop the techniques of yellow journalism, which won over readers with sensationalism, sex, crime, and graphic horrors. Circulation reached a million copies a day, and the journalism opened the way to mass-circulation newspapers that depended on advertising revenue, rather than on cover price or on political-party subsidies. Such newspapers attracted readers by using multiple forms of news, gossip, entertainment, and advertising.

Pulitzer's name is best known for the Pulitzer Prizes established in 1917 pursuant to an endowment to Columbia University specified in his will. The university awards prizes annually to recognize and reward excellence in American journalism, photography, literature, history, poetry, music, and drama. Pulitzer also funded the Columbia School of Journalism with his philanthropic bequest; it opened in 1912.

== Early life ==
Born in 1847 as Pulitzer József (name order by Hungarian custom) in Makó, about 200 kilometers south-east of Budapest, he was the son of Elize (Berger) and Fülöp Pulitzer (born Politzer). The Pulitzers were among several Jewish families living in the area and had established a reputation as merchants and shopkeepers. Joseph's father was a respected businessman, regarded as the second of the "foremost merchants" of Makó. Their ancestors emigrated from Police (German: Pullitz) in Moravia to Hungary at the end of the 18th century.

In 1853, Fülöp Pulitzer was rich enough to retire. He moved his family to Pest, where he had the children educated by private tutors, and taught French and German. In 1858, after Fülöp's death, his business went bankrupt, and the family became impoverished. Joseph attempted to enlist in various European armies for work before emigrating to the United States.

=== American Civil War service ===
Pulitzer tried to join the military but was rejected by the Austrian Army. He then tried to join the French Foreign Legion to fight in Mexico but was similarly rejected, and then the British Army, and was again rejected. He was finally recruited in Hamburg, Germany, to fight for the Union in the American Civil War in August 1864. Pulitzer could not speak English when he arrived in Boston Harbor in 1864 at the age of 17, his passage having been paid by Massachusetts military recruiters. Learning that the recruiters were pocketing the lion's share of his enlistment bounty, Pulitzer left the Deer Island recruiting station and made his way to New York.

Pulitzer was paid $200 to enlist in the Lincoln Cavalry on September 30, 1864. He was a part of Sheridan's troopers, in the 1st New York Cavalry Regiment in Company L, joining the regiment in Virginia in November 1864, and fighting in the Appomattox Campaign, before being mustered out on June 5, 1865. Although he spoke German, Hungarian, and French, Pulitzer learned little English until after the war, as his regiment was composed mostly of German immigrants.

== Early career in St. Louis ==
After the war, Pulitzer returned to New York City, where he stayed briefly. He moved to New Bedford, Massachusetts, for the whaling industry, but found it was too boring for him. He returned to New York with little money. Flat broke, he slept in wagons on cobblestone side streets. He decided to travel by "side-door Pullman" (a freight boxcar) to St. Louis, Missouri. He sold his one possession, a white handkerchief, for 75 cents.

When Pulitzer arrived in the city, he later recalled, "The lights of St. Louis looked like a promised land to me." There his German was as useful as it was in Munich, because of the large ethnic German population, due to strong immigration following the European revolutions of 1848. In the local German-language newspaper Westliche Post, Pulitzer saw an advertisement for a mule hostler at Benton Barracks. The next day he walked four miles and got the job, but held it for only two days. He quit due to the poor food and the whims of the mules, stating "The man who has not cared for sixteen mules does not know what work and troubles are." Pulitzer had difficulty holding jobs; he was too scrawny for heavy labor and likely too proud and temperamental to take orders.

He worked as a waiter at Tony Faust, a famous restaurant on Fifth Street. It was frequented by members of the St. Louis Philosophical Society, including Thomas Davidson, the German Henry C. Brockmeyer; and William Torrey Harris. Pulitzer studied Brockmeyer, who was famous for translating the German philosopher GWF Hegel, and he "would hang on Brockmeyer's thunderous words, even as he served them pretzels and beer." He was fired after a tray slipped from his hand and a patron was soaked in beer.

Pulitzer spent his free time at the St. Louis Mercantile Library on the corner of Fifth and Locust, studying English and reading voraciously. He made a life-long friend there in the librarian Udo Brachvogel. He often played in the library's chess room, where Carl Schurz noticed his aggressive style. Pulitzer greatly admired the German-born Schurz, an emblem of the success attainable by a foreign-born citizen through his own energies and skills. In 1868, Pulitzer was admitted to the bar, but his broken English and odd appearance kept clients away. He struggled with the execution of minor papers and the collecting of debts. That year, when the Westliche Post needed a reporter, he was offered the job.

Soon after, Pulitzer and several dozen men each paid a fast-talking promoter five dollars after being promised good-paying jobs on a Louisiana sugar plantation. They boarded a steamboat, which took them downriver thirty miles south of the city, where the crew forced them off. When the boat churned away, the men concluded the promised plantation jobs had been a ruse. They walked back to the city, where Pulitzer wrote an account of the fraud and was pleased when it was accepted by the Westliche Post, edited by Emil Preetorius and Carl Schurz, evidently his first published news story. On March 6, 1867, Pulitzer became a naturalized American citizen.

== Entry to journalism and politics ==
In the Westliche Post building, Pulitzer made the acquaintance of attorneys William Patrick and Charles Phillip Johnson and surgeon Joseph Nash McDowell. Patrick and Johnson referred to Pulitzer as "Shakespeare" because of his extraordinary profile. They helped him secure a job with the Atlantic and Pacific Railroad. His work was to record the railroad land deeds in the twelve counties in southwest Missouri where the railroad planned to build a line. When he was done, the lawyers gave him desk space and allowed him to study law in their library to prepare for the bar.

Pulitzer displayed a flair for reporting. He would work sixteen hours a day – from 10 a.m. to 2 a.m. He was nicknamed "Joey the German" or "Joey the Jew". He joined the Philosophical Society and frequented a German book store where many intellectuals hung out. Among his new group of friends were Joseph Keppler and Thomas Davidson.

=== Missouri State Representative ===
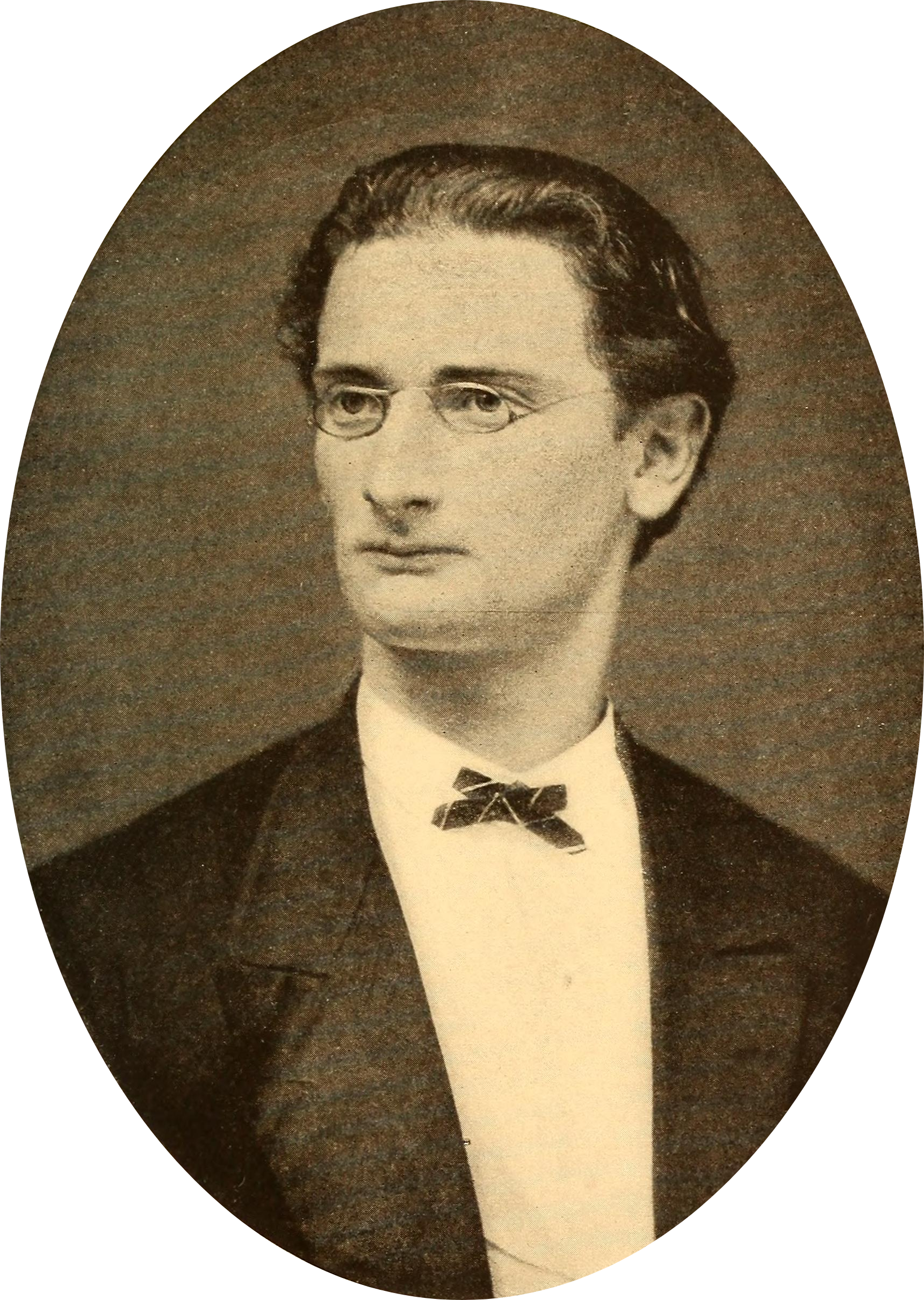
Pulitzer at the age of 23.

Pulitzer joined Schurz's Republican Party. On December 14, 1869, Pulitzer attended the Republican meeting at the St. Louis Turnhalle on Tenth Street, where party leaders needed a candidate to fill a vacancy in the state legislature. After their first choice refused, they settled on Pulitzer, nominating him unanimously, forgetting he was only 22, three years under the required age. However, his chief Democratic opponent was possibly ineligible because he had served in the Confederate army. Pulitzer organized street meetings, called personally on the voters, and exhibited such sincerity along with his oddities that he had pumped a half-amused excitement into a campaign that was normally lethargic, subsequently winning 209–147. His age was not made an issue and he was seated as a state representative in Jefferson City at the session beginning January 5, 1870. During his time in Jefferson City, Pulitzer voted in favor of the adoption of the Fifteenth Amendment and led a crusade to reform the corrupt St. Louis County Court.

His fight against the court angered Captain Edward Augustine, Superintendent of Registration for St. Louis County. Their rivalry became so heated that on the night of January 27, Augustine confronted Pulitzer at Schmidt's Hotel and called him a "damned liar." Pulitzer left the building, returned to his room, and retrieved a four-barreled pistol. He returned to the parlor and approached Augustine, renewing the argument. When Augustine advanced on Pulitzer, the young Representative aimed his pistol at the Captain's midriff. Augustine tackled Pulitzer, and the gun fired two shots, tearing through Augustine's knee and the hotel floor. Pulitzer suffered a head wound. Contemporary accounts conflict on whether Augustine was also armed. While in Jefferson City, Pulitzer also moved up one notch in the administration at the Westliche Post. He eventually became its managing editor, and obtained a proprietary interest.

=== Break from the Republican Party and Schurz ===
Pulitzer (second row from bottom, third from right, #55) with other members of the Constitutional Convention of Missouri, 1875

On August 31, 1870, Schurz (now a U.S. Senator), Pulitzer, and other reformist anti-Grant Republicans bolted from the state convention at the Capitol and nominated a competing Liberal Republican ticket for Missouri, led by the former Senator Benjamin Gratz Brown. Brown was successful in the November election over the mainline Republican ticket, presenting a serious threat to President Grant's reelection chances. On January 19, 1872, Brown appointed Pulitzer to the St. Louis Board of Police Commissioners.

In May 1872, Pulitzer was a delegate to the Cincinnati convention of the Liberal Republican Party, which nominated New York Tribune editor Horace Greeley for the presidency with Gratz Brown as his running mate. Pulitzer and Schurz were expected to boost Governor Brown for the presidential nomination, but Schurz preferred the more idealistic Charles Francis Adams Sr. A loyal Brown man alerted the Governor of this betrayal, and Governor Brown and his cousin Francis Preston Blair sped to Cincinnati to rally their supporters to Greeley. While in Cincinnati, he met fellow reformist newspapermen Samuel Bowles, Murat Halstead, Horace White, and Alexander McClure. He also met Greeley's assistant and campaign manager Whitelaw Reid, who would become Pulitzer's journalistic adversary. However, Greeley's campaign was ultimately a disaster, and the new party collapsed, leaving Schurz and Pulitzer politically homeless.

In 1874, Pulitzer promoted a reform movement christened the People's Party, which united the Grange with dissident Republicans. However, Pulitzer was disappointed with the party's tepid stances on the issues and mediocre ticket, led by gentleman farmer William Gentry. He returned to St. Louis and endorsed the Democratic ticket. Pulitzer's own views were in line with Democratic orthodoxy on low tariffs, and limited federal powers; his prior opposition to the Democrats was out of disgust for slavery and the Confederate rebellion. Pulitzer campaigned for the Democratic ticket throughout the state and published a damaging rumor (leaked by future Senator George Vest) that Gentry had sold a slave. He also served as a delegate to the 1874 Missouri Constitutional Convention representing St. Louis, arguing successfully for true home rule for the city.

In 1876, Pulitzer, by now completely disillusioned with the corruption of the Republicans and their nomination of Rutherford B. Hayes, gave nearly seventy speeches in favor of Democratic candidate Samuel J. Tilden throughout the country. Schurz, who saw Hayes as a reformer with integrity, returned to the Republican fold. In his speeches, Pulitzer denounced Schurz and urged reconciliation between North and South. While on his speaking tour, Pulitzer also wrote dispatches to the New York Sun on behalf of the Samuel Tilden 1876 presidential campaign. After Tilden's narrow defeat under dubious circumstances, Pulitzer became disillusioned with his candidate's indecision and timid response, and would oppose Tilden's 1880 run for the Democratic nomination. Pulitzer returned to St. Louis to practice law and search for future opportunities in news.

== St. Louis Post-Dispatch ==
Pulitzer c. 1880

On his thirtieth birthday, Pulitzer's home at the old Southern Hotel burned to the ground, likely destroying most of his personal belongings and papers. On December 9, 1878, Pulitzer bought the moribund St. Louis Dispatch and merged it with John Dillon's St. Louis Post, forming the St. Louis Post and Dispatch (soon renamed the Post-Dispatch) on December 12. With his own paper, Pulitzer developed his role as a champion of the common man, featuring exposés and a hard-hitting populist approach. The paper was considered a leader in the field of sensational journalism.

The circulation of the Post-Dispatch steadily rose during Pulitzer's early tenure (aided by the collapse of the city's other daily English-language paper, the Star). At the time of merger, the Post and Dispatch had a combined circulation of under 4,000. By the end of 1879, circulation was up to 4,984 and Pulitzer doubled the size of the paper to eight pages. By the end of 1880, circulation was up to 8,740. Circulation rose dramatically to 12,000 by March 1881 and to 22,300 by September 1882. Pulitzer bought two new presses and increased staff pay to the highest in the city, though he also crushed an attempt to unionize.

=== Political activism ===
Pulitzer's primary political rival at this time was Bourbon Democrat William Hyde, publisher of the (misleadingly named) Missouri Republican. Pulitzer's much smaller paper won a series of early political skirmishes over Hyde. First, George Vest was elected to the Senate in 1879 with Pulitzer's backing over Bourbon Samuel Glover. Next, Pulitzer secured election for an anti-Tilden delegation (including himself) to the 1880 Democratic National Convention, over Hyde's objection. Though Pulitzer could not convince Horatio Seymour, his preferred candidate, to run, the Democrats did not renominate Tilden. In March 1882, the two men even came to physical blows on Olive Street but were separated by a crowd before either was injured.

In 1880, Pulitzer made a second run for public office, this time for United States Representative from Missouri's second district. However, he was resoundingly defeated for the Democratic nomination (tantamount to victory in heavily Democratic St. Louis) by Bourbon Thomas Allen, 4,254 to 709.

=== Killing of Alonzo Slayback ===
When Thomas Allen died during his first term, Pulitzer's Post-Dispatch strongly opposed the Republican's endorsed candidate, James Broadhead, an attorney working for the railroad magnate Jay Gould. The election became heated, and Post-Dispatch managing editor John Cockerill called Broadhead's law partner Alonzo Slayback a "coward." Slayback entered the Post-Dispatch offices on October 13, 1882, armed with a gun, and threatened Cockerill; Cockerill shot him dead. The story became a national sensation and turned many conservative Democrats vehemently against Pulitzer and the Post-Dispatch. After a grand jury inquest, Cockerill was never put on trial. Pulitzer replaced him with John Dillon, former owner of the Post and unlike Pulitzer and Cockerill, a well-respected, conservative native of the city. However, the incident permanently damaged Pulitzer's reputation in the city, and he began to seek opportunities elsewhere.

== New York World ==
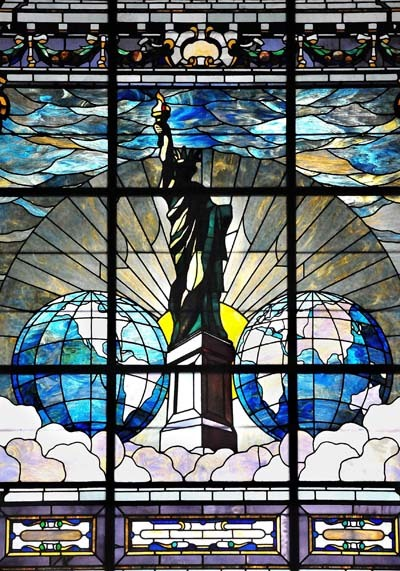
"Liberty Enlightening the World, or The Statue of Liberty," a stained glass window commissioned by Pulitzer to commemorate the New York World's fundraising for the pedestal of the Statue of Liberty. Originally installed in the New York World Building, it was moved to Pulitzer Hall at Columbia University.

In April 1883, the Pulitzer family traveled to New York, ostensibly to start a European vacation, but actually so that Joseph could make an offer to Jay Gould for ownership of the morning New York World. Gould had acquired the newspaper as a throw-in in one of his railroad deals, and it had been losing about $40,000 a year, possibly because of the stigma the unpopular Gould's ownership brought. In return for the paper, Gould asked Pulitzer for a sum well over a half-million dollars, as well as the retention of the World's staff and building. After some frustration at this demand and disagreement with his brother Albert, Pulitzer was prepared to give up. At the urging of his wife Kate, however, he returned to negotiations with Gould. They agreed to a sale for $346,000 with Pulitzer retaining full freedom in the selection of staff.

The Pulitzers moved to New York full time, leasing a home in Gramercy Park. The World immediately gained 6,000 readers in its first two weeks under Pulitzer and had more than doubled its circulation to 39,000 within three months. As he had in St. Louis, Pulitzer emphasized sensational stories: human-interest, crime, disasters, and scandal. Under Pulitzer's leadership, circulation grew from 15,000 to 600,000, making the World the largest newspaper in the country. Pulitzer emphasized broad appeal through short, provocative headlines and sentences; the World's self-described style was "brief, breezy and briggity." His World featured illustrations, advertising, and a culture of consumption for working men. Crusades for reform and entertainment news were two main staples for the World. Pulitzer explained that:

The American people want something terse, forcible, picturesque, striking, something that will arrest their attention, enlist their sympathy, arouse their indignation, stimulate their imagination, convince their reason, [and] awaken their conscience.

Pulitzer and The New York World played a central role in fundraising for the pedestal of the Statue of Liberty. After efforts to raise sufficient funds in the United States had stalled, Pulitzer initiated a nationwide public fundraising campaign through his newspaper in 1885. The campaign solicited small donations from the general public and pledged to publish the name of every contributor, regardless of the amount given. Historians have since described this effort as an early form of mass crowdfunding, comparable in structure to modern platforms such as GoFundMe. Within three months, the campaign raised more than $100,000 (equivalent to over $30 million today), allowing construction of the pedestal to begin.

In 1887, Pulitzer recruited the famous investigative journalist Nellie Bly. He also constructed the New York World Building, designed by George B. Post and completed in 1890. Pulitzer dictated several aspects of the design, including the building's triple-height main entrance arch, dome, and rounded corner at Park Row and Frankfort Street. In 1895, the World introduced the immensely popular The Yellow Kid comic by Richard F. Outcault, one of the first strips to be featured in the newly launched Sunday color supplement shortly after. After the World exposed an illegal payment of $40,000,000 by the United States to the French Panama Canal Company (a deal completed in 1904 but investigated in 1909), Pulitzer was indicted for libeling Theodore Roosevelt and J. P. Morgan. The courts dismissed the indictments. Newspaper writer and editor of The San Francisco Call, John McNaught went to New York to work under Pulitzer as his personal secretary from 1907 to 1912. When McNaught left The Evening World, he became editor of the New York World, through 1915.

=== Early political activism ===
When Pulitzer purchased the World, New York City, though overwhelmingly Democratic, did not have a major Democratic newspaper. The Tribune (under Whitelaw Reid) and Times were ardently Republican and the Sun (under Charles Dana) and Herald were independent. In the first issue under his ownership, Pulitzer announced the paper would be "dedicated to the cause of the people rather than that of purse-potentates." In 1884, he joined the Manhattan Club, a group of wealthy Democrats including Tilden, Abram Hewitt, and William C. Whitney. Through the World, he supported the campaign of New York Governor Grover Cleveland for president. Pulitzer's campaign for Cleveland and against Republican James G. Blaine may have been pivotal in securing the presidency for Cleveland, who won New York's decisive votes by just 0.1%. The campaign also boosted the World's circulation dramatically; by Election Day, it averaged about 110,000 copies per day and its Election Day special ran 223,680 copies. Pulitzer also attacked young Republican Assemblyman Theodore Roosevelt as a "reform fraud," beginning a long and heated rivalry with the future President.

=== United States House of Representatives ===
In 1884, Pulitzer was elected to the U.S. House of Representatives from New York's ninth district as a Democrat and entered office on March 4, 1885. Though inundated with office seekers hoping for appointment by President-elect Cleveland, Pulitzer recommended only the appointments of Charles Gibson for Minister to Berlin and Pallen as consul general in London. But Pulitzer did not secure a meeting with the President-elect, and neither man was appointed. During his term in office, Pulitzer led a crusade to place the newly gifted Statue of Liberty in New York City. He was a member of the Committee on Commerce. During his time in Washington, Pulitzer lived at the luxurious hotel run by John Chamberlin at the corner of 15th and I streets, N.W. However, Pulitzer soon determined that his position at the World was both more powerful and more enjoyable than Congress. He began to spend less and less time in Washington, and ultimately resigned on April 10, 1886, after little over a year in office.

=== Rivalry with William Randolph Hearst ===
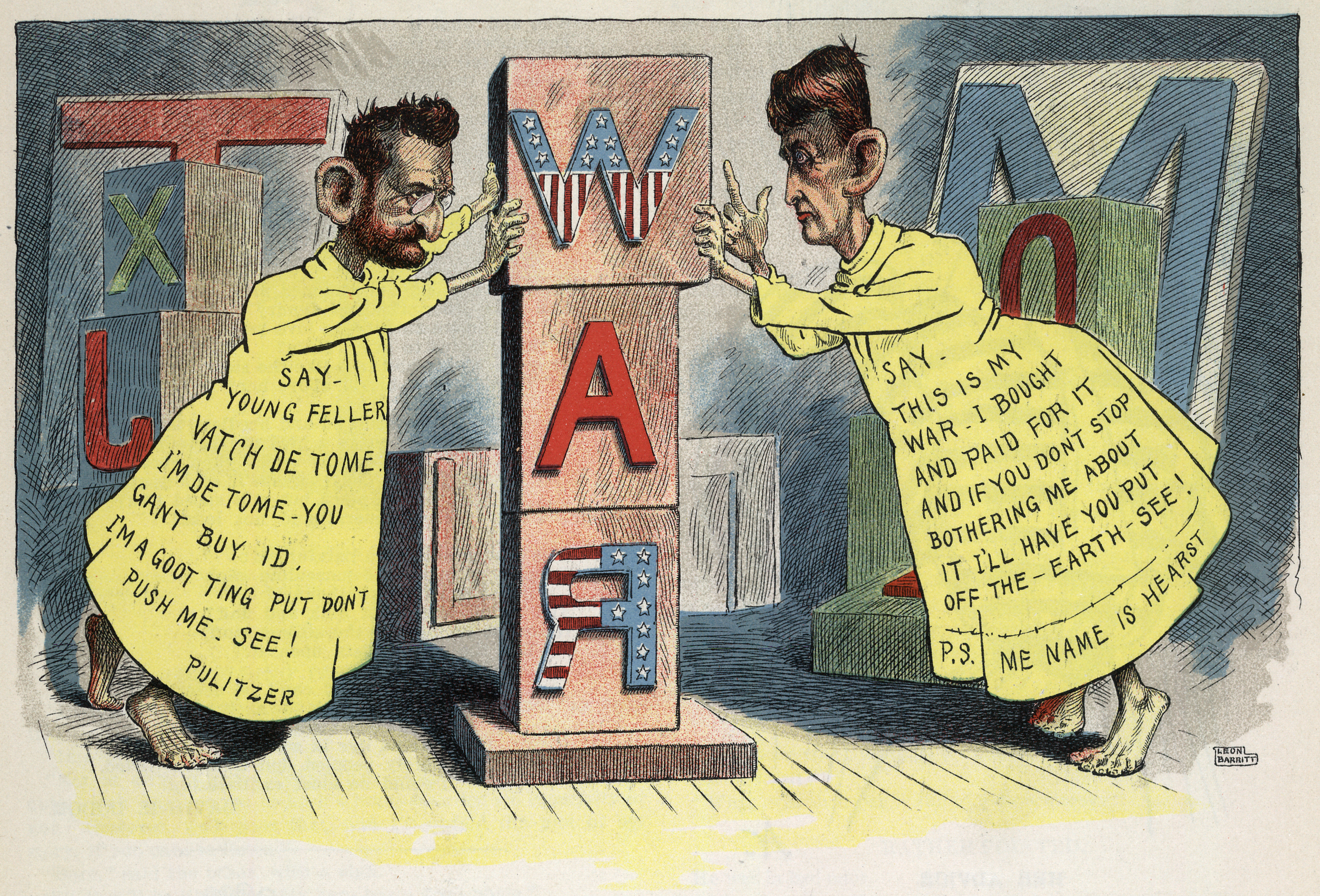
An 1898 editorial cartoon by Leon Barritt depicts Pulitzer and Hearst each pushing for war with Spain.

In 1895, William Randolph Hearst purchased the rival New York Journal, which at one time had been owned by Pulitzer's brother, Albert. Hearst had once been a great admirer of Pulitzer's World. The two embarked on a circulation war. This competition with Hearst, particularly the coverage before and during the Spanish–American War, linked Pulitzer's name with yellow journalism. Pulitzer and Hearst were also the cause of the newsboys' strike of 1899, a youth-led campaign to force change in the way that Joseph Pulitzer and William Randolph Hearst's newspapers compensated their child newspaper hawkers.

=== Other rivals ===
Charles A. Dana, the editor of the rival New York Sun and personal enemy of Grover Cleveland, became estranged from Pulitzer during the 1884 campaign. Dana's Sun endorsed Greenback nominee Benjamin Butler, a major blow in swing state New York. He attacked Pulitzer in print, often calling him "Judas Pulitzer." After Cleveland's victory, the Sun's circulation had been halved and the World replaced it as the largest Democratic paper in the country. Leander Richardson, a former employee who left the World to run The Journalist, was even more directly antisemitic, referring to his former boss only as "Jewseph Pulitzer". Whitelaw Reid frequently sparred with Pulitzer, both in person and in their respective papers.

== Declining health and resignation ==
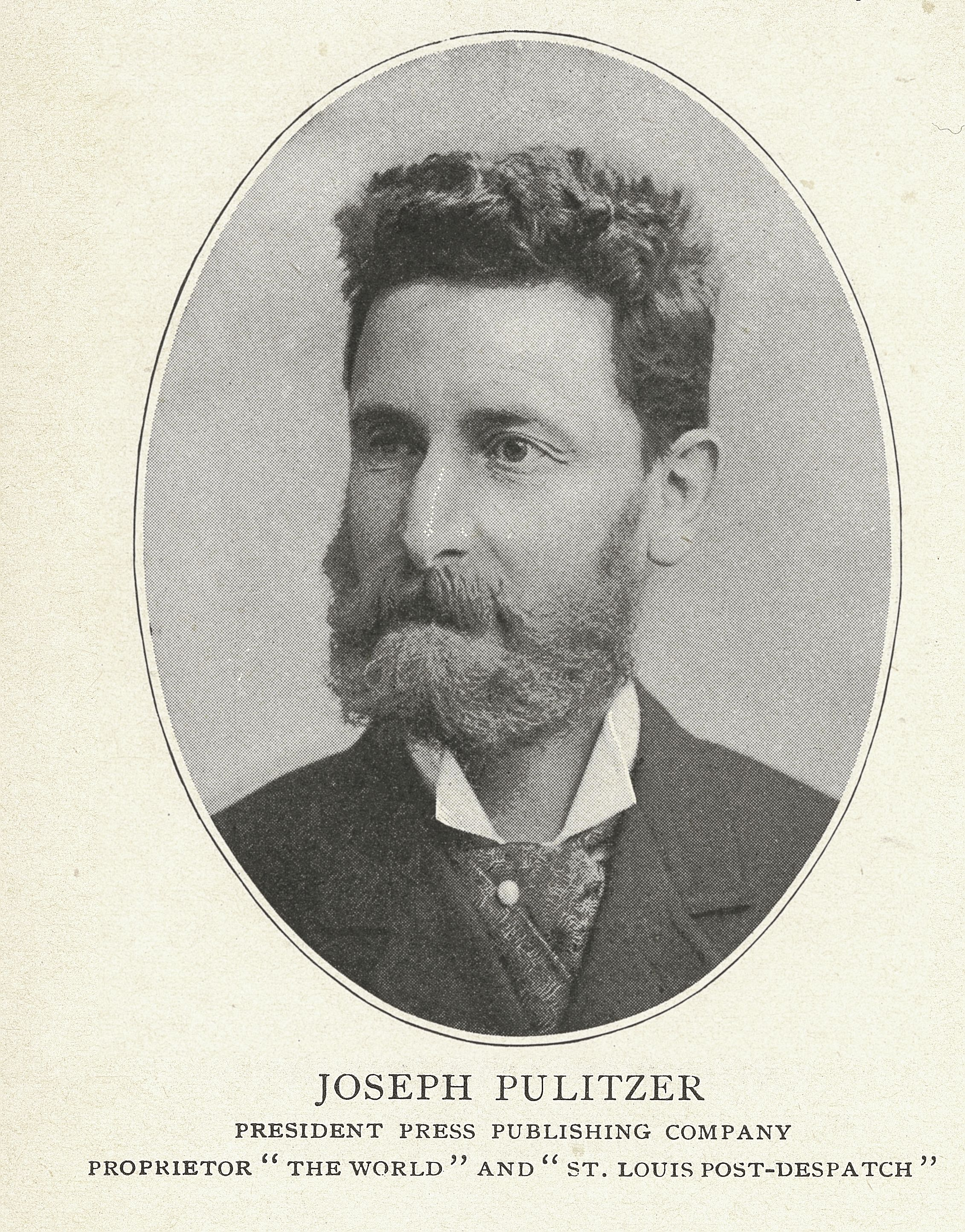
Pulitzer c. 1899

Pulitzer's health problems (blindness, depression, and acute noise sensitivity) caused a rapid deterioration, and he had to withdraw from the daily management of the newspaper. He continued to manage the paper from his New York mansion, his winter retreat at the Jekyll Island Club on Jekyll Island, Georgia, and his summer vacation retreat in Bar Harbor, Maine. After he hired Frank I. Cobb (1869–1923) in 1904 as the editor of the New York World, the younger man resisted Pulitzer's attempts to "run the office" from his home. Time after time, they battled each other, often with heated language.

When Pulitzer's son Ralph took over administrative responsibility in 1907, Pulitzer wrote a carefully worded resignation. It was printed in every New York paper except the World. Pulitzer was insulted but slowly began to respect Cobb's editorials and independent spirit. Their exchanges, commentaries, and messages increased. The good rapport between the two was based largely on Cobb's flexibility. In May 1908, Cobb and Pulitzer met to outline plans for a consistent editorial policy but it wavered on occasion. Pulitzer's demands for editorials on contemporary breaking news led to overwork by Cobb. Pulitzer sent him on a six-week tour of Europe to restore his spirit. Cobb continued the editorial policies he had shared with Pulitzer until Cobb died of cancer in 1923. In a company meeting, Professor Thomas Davidson said, "I cannot understand why it is, Mr. Pulitzer, that you always speak so kindly of reporters and so severely of all editors." "Well", Pulitzer replied, "I suppose it is because every reporter is a hope, and every editor is a disappointment." This phrase became an epigram of journalism.

== Marriage and family ==
In 1878 at the age of 31, Pulitzer married Katherine "Kate" Davis (1853–1927), a woman of high social standing from Georgetown, District of Columbia. She was five years younger than Pulitzer, from an Episcopal family, and rumored to be a distant relative of Jefferson Davis. They married in an Episcopal ceremony at the Church of the Epiphany in Washington, D.C. He did not reveal his Jewish heritage to Katherine or her family until after their marriage, to her shock.

Of seven children, five lived to adulthood: Ralph, Joseph Jr. (father of Joseph Pulitzer III), Constance Helen (1888–1938), who married William Gray Elmslie, D.D. Edith (1886–1975), who married William Scoville Moore, and Herbert, eventually his brother Ralph's partner at the Post. Their daughter, Katherine Ethel Pulitzer, died of pneumonia in May 1884 at age 2. On December 31, 1897, their oldest daughter, Lucille Irma Pulitzer, died at the age of 17 from typhoid fever. An Irish immigrant named Mary Boyle largely raised the children while their parents were busy. Pulitzer's grandson Herbert Pulitzer Jr. was married to the American fashion designer and socialite Lilly Pulitzer.

Following a fire at his former residence, Pulitzer commissioned Stanford White to design a limestone-clad Venetian palazzo at 11 East 73rd Street on the Upper East Side; it was completed in 1903. Pulitzer's thoughtful seated portrait by John Singer Sargent is at the Columbia School of Journalism that he endowed. The family continued to be involved in the operation of the Post-Dispatch and other newspapers under the Pulitzer Publishing Company until selling them to Lee Enterprises in 2005. The Pulitzer group also comprised television stations, which would be sold to Hearst Communications, owned by the descendants of William Randolph Hearst.

== Death ==
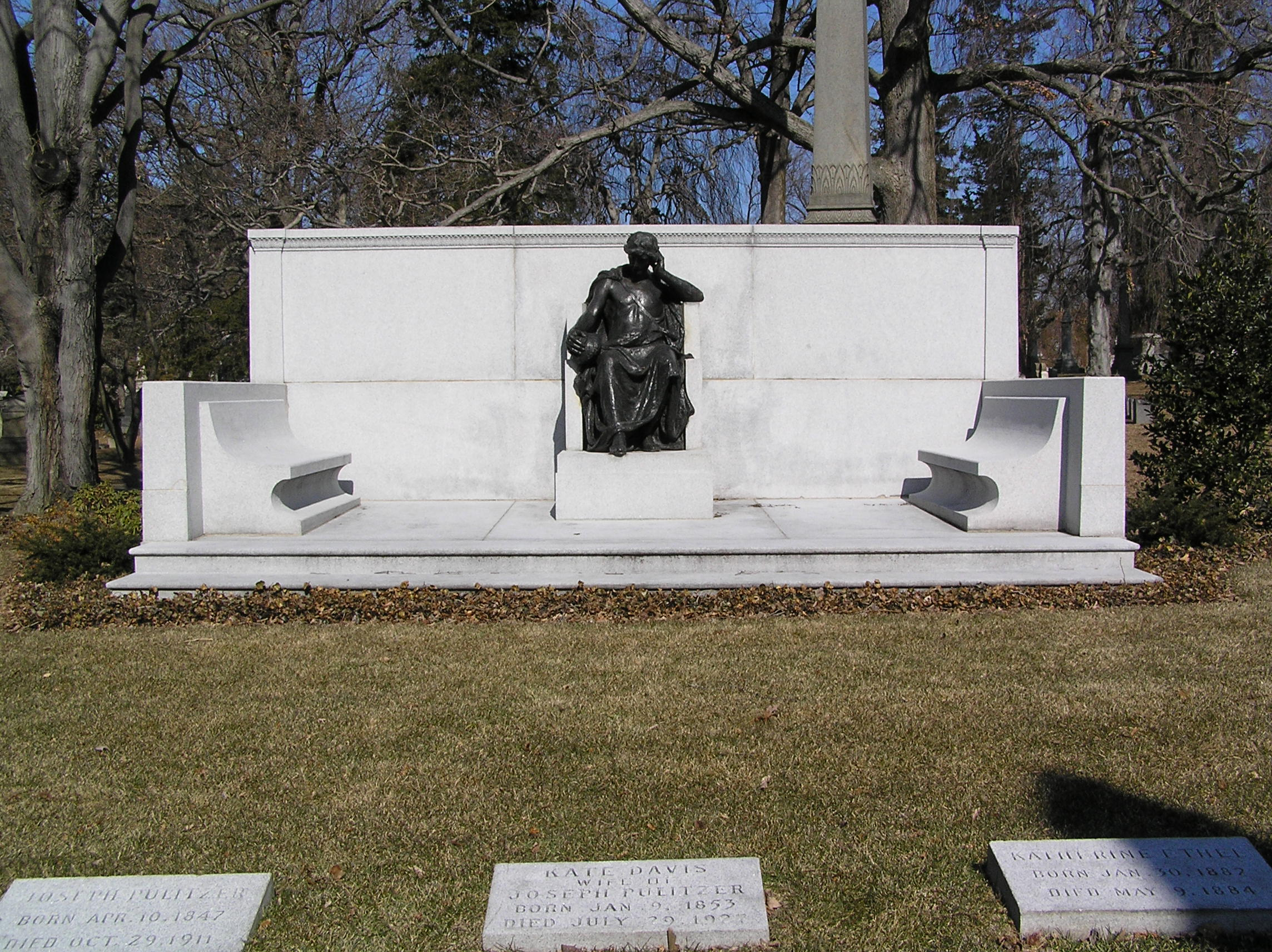
The grave of Joseph Pulitzer in Woodlawn Cemetery

For six months during 1908, Pulitzer was attended to by his personal physician C. Louis Leipoldt aboard his yacht Liberty. While traveling to his winter home at the Jekyll Island Club on Jekyll Island, Georgia, in 1911, Pulitzer had his yacht stop in Charleston Harbor, South Carolina. On October 29, 1911, Pulitzer listened to his German secretary read aloud about King Louis XI of France. As the secretary neared the end, Pulitzer said in German: "Leise, ganz leise" (English: "Softly, quite softly"), and died. His body was returned to New York for funerary services and interred in Woodlawn Cemetery in The Bronx.

== Legacy ==
=== Journalism schools ===
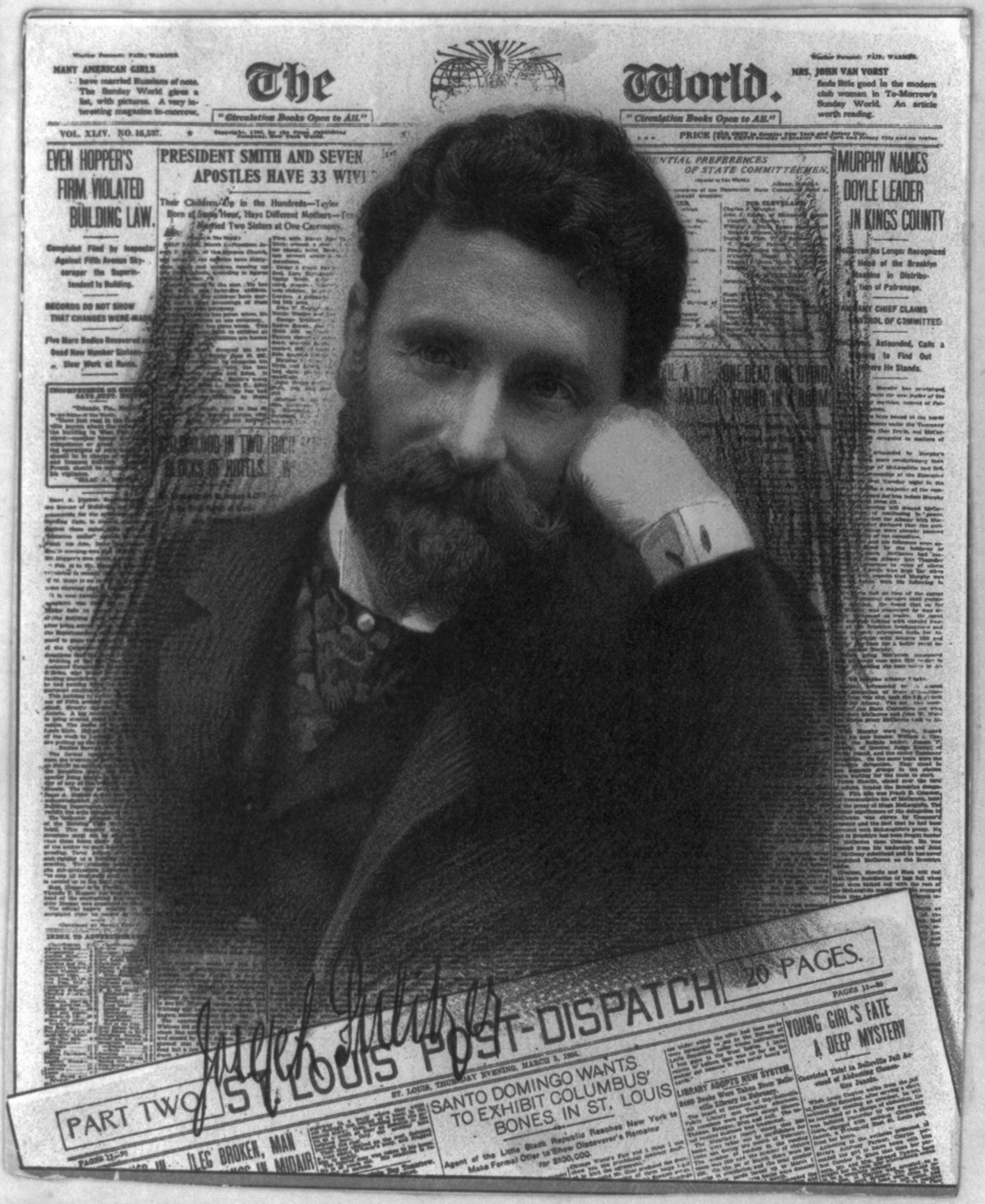
A chromolithograph of Pulitzer superimposed on a composite of his newspapers.

In 1892, Pulitzer offered Columbia University's president, Seth Low, money to set up the world's first school of journalism. The university initially turned down the money. In 1902, Columbia's new president Nicholas Murray Butler was more receptive to the plan for a school and journalism prizes, but it would not be until after Pulitzer's death that this dream would be fulfilled. Pulitzer left the university $2,000,000 in his will. In 1912, the school founded the Columbia University Graduate School of Journalism. This followed the Missouri School of Journalism, founded at the University of Missouri with Pulitzer's urging. Both schools remain among the most prestigious in the world.

=== Pulitzer Prize ===
In 1917, Columbia organized the awards of the first Pulitzer Prizes in journalism. The awards have been expanded to recognize achievements in literature, poetry, history, music, and drama.

=== Honors ===
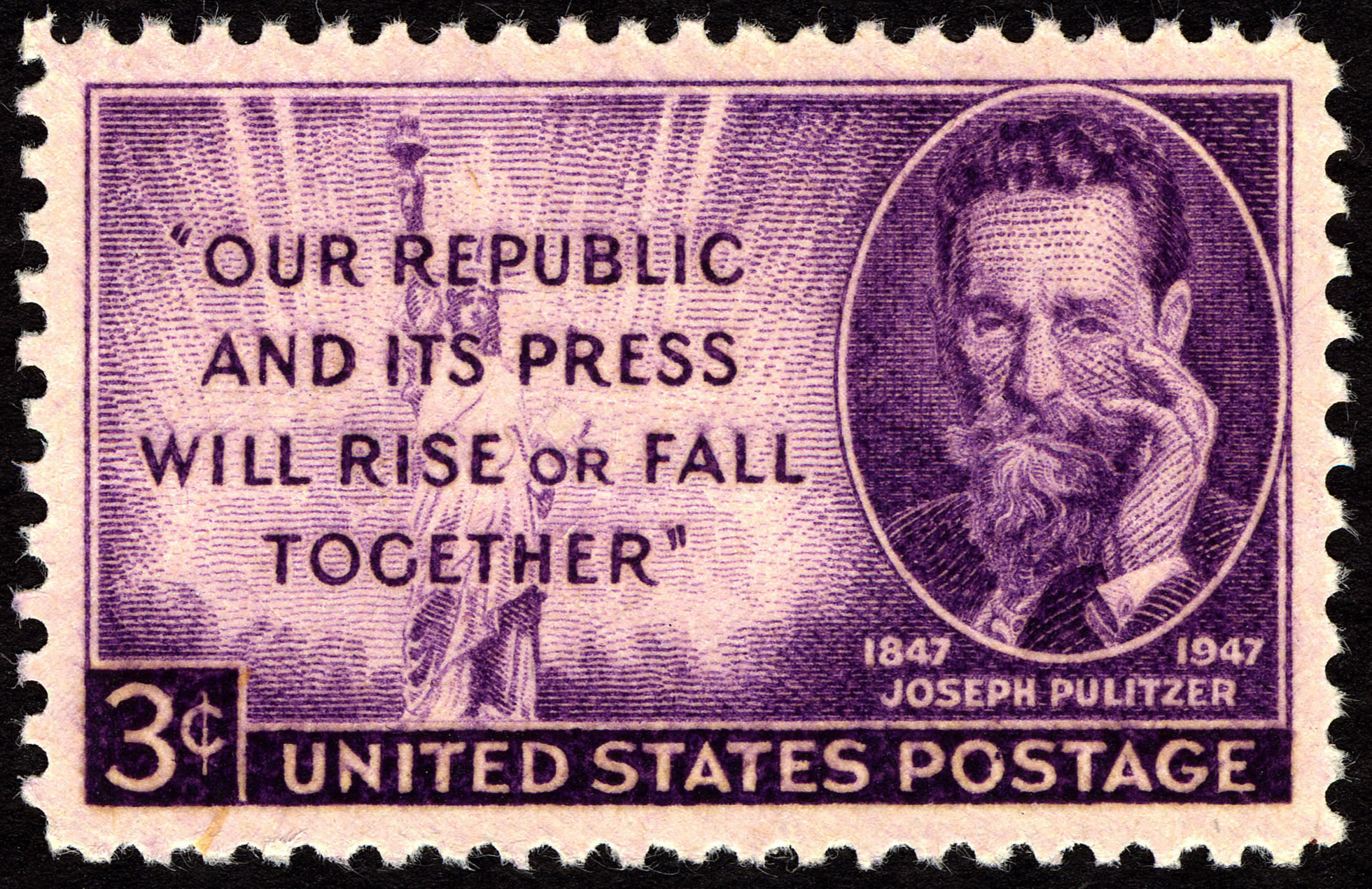
Joseph Pulitzer commemorative stamp, issued in 1947

- The U.S. Post Office issued a 3-cent stamp commemorating Joseph Pulitzer in 1947, the 100th anniversary of his birth.
- The Pulitzer Arts Foundation in Saint Louis was founded by his family's philanthropy and is named in their honor.
- In 1989, Joseph Pulitzer was inducted into the St. Louis Walk of Fame.
- He is featured as the antagonist of the Disney film Newsies (1992), in which he was played by Robert Duvall, and the adapted 2011 Broadway stage production (Newsies).
- In the 2014 historical novel The New Colossus, written by Marshall Goldberg and published by Diversion Books, Joseph Pulitzer gives reporter Nellie Bly the assignment of investigating the death of poet Emma Lazarus.
- The Hotel Pulitzer in Amsterdam was named after his grandson, Herbert Pulitzer.
- Mount Pulitzer of Olympic National Park in Washington is named for him.

== See also ==
- Joseph Pulitzer House
- Place des États-Unis
- Pulitzer Arts Foundation
- List of Jewish members of the United States Congress

== Notes ==
U.S. House of Representatives
Preceded by John Hardy	Member of the U.S. House of Representatives from New York's 9th congressional district March 4, 1885 – April 10, 1886	Succeeded by Samuel S. Cox
