= Emil Makai =

Hungarian-Jewish poet, journalist, dramatist, and translator

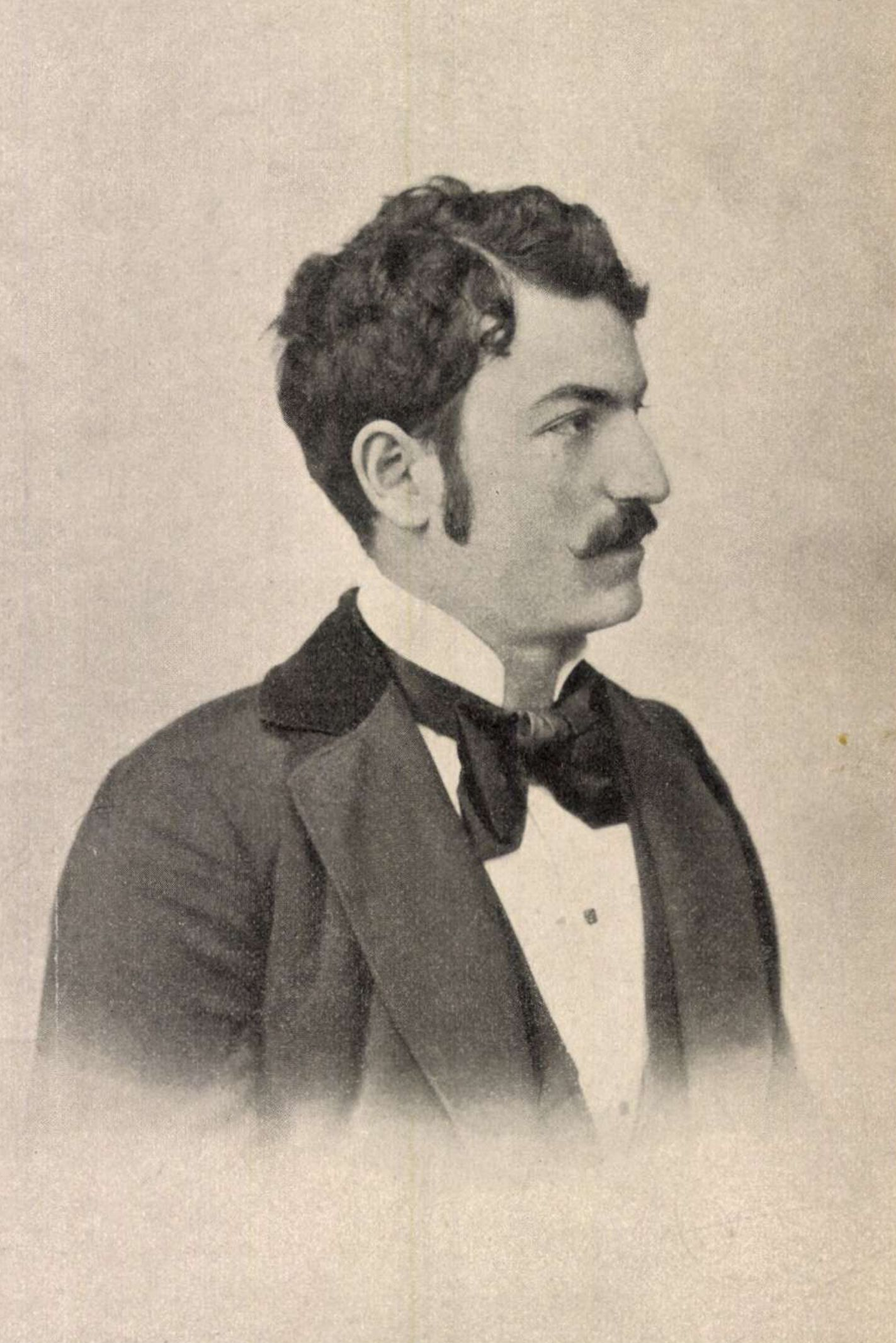
- Born: Emil Fischer; 17 November 1870; Makó, Hungary
- Died: 6 August 1901 (aged 30)
- Education: Budapest rabbinical seminary
- Writing career
- Language: Hungarian

Emil Makai (17 November 1870 – 6 August 1901), born Emil Fischer, was a Hungarian-Jewish poet, journalist, dramatist, and translator.

== Biography ==
Born to Rabbi Antal Enoch Fischer in Makó, Makkai went to Budapest in 1884, where he distinguished himself at the Budapest rabbinical seminary as a student by his poetical talent.

In 1888, Makai published his first volume of poetry, Vallásos énekek ("Religious Songs"). This was followed by a Biblical drama, Absalon (1891), and Zsidó költők ("Jewish Poets," 1892), translations of medieval Hebrew poetry, including the works of Shlomo ibn Gabirol, Yehudah ha-Levi, Shmuel ha-Nagid, Moshe ibn Ezra, Avraham ibn Ezra, Yehuda al-Harizi, and Imanuel ha-Romi. In 1893, his version of the Song of Songs (Énekek éneke) was published. From 1892 Makai translated more than 100 dramas and operettas, included Abraham Goldfaden's Sulamit and Bar Kochba.

== Works ==
- Vallásos énekek ("Religious Songs", 1888)
- Absolon ("Absalom", 1891)
- Komédiások (1891)
- Zsidó költők ("Jewish Poets", 1892)
- Énekek éneke ("Song of Songs", 1893)
- Margit (1896)
- A királyné apródja (1899)
- Robinzonok (1899)
- Tudós professzor Hatvani ("The Learned Professor Hatvani", 1900)

=== Translations ===
- Toto és Tata (1895)
- A kék asszony (1897)
- Jáfet tizenkét felesége (1898)
- A görög rabszolga (1899)
- A modell (1901)
- A kölcsönkért vőlegény (1901)
