= Peter Lantos =

British scientist and author of Hungarian Jewish origin

Peter Lantos BEM FMedSci
- Born: Peter Laszlo Lantos; 1939 (age 86–87); Makó, Hungary
- Citizenship: United Kingdom

Academic work
- Discipline: Medical research
- Sub-discipline: Neurodegenerative diseases; Alzheimer's disease; Parkinson's disease
- Institutions: Middlesex Hospital Medical School; Maudsley Hospital; Institute of Psychiatry, King's College London

Peter Laszlo Lantos BEM FMedSci (born 1939) is a British scientist and author of Hungarian Jewish origin. After surviving the Holocaust, he went on to undertake medical studies. He moved to the United Kingdom in 1968 where he worked as a medical researcher, specialising in neurodegenerative diseases. In retirement, he has published books for both adults and children relating to his experience of the Holocaust and he is involved in Holocaust education.

== Biography ==
He was born in Makó in southeast Hungary. In 1944, when Peter was five, his family were deported to Bergen-Belsen concentration camp because of the Holocaust. At the concentration camp, the Nazis murdered his father through grueling forced labor. Peter and his mother were sent back to Hungary on a train that was meant to go to a death camp, meaning they were free from the Holocaust but 21 members of his family had died, including his older brother Gyuri, like him a talented mathematician. He completed his medical studies in Hungary before moving to the UK in 1968 for further education and research.

Lantos decided to remain in the UK permanently and was sentenced to prison in absentia by the Hungarian authorities for his defection. As a result, he would not be able to visit his homeland until the fall of Communism in 1989. As a medical researcher, Lantos published more than 500 scientific articles, in addition to numerous textbooks. He worked variously at the Middlesex Hospital Medical School, the Middlesex Hospital, and the Maudsley Hospital, London. He is especially well known for his research on neurodegenerative diseases including Alzheimer's disease and Parkinson's. The Papp–Lantos inclusion is named after him. In recognition of his achievements, he was elected Fellow of the Academy of Medical Sciences (FMedSci) in 2001. At the time of his election, he was Professor of Neuropathology at the Institute of Psychiatry, King's College London, and he is professor emeritus in retirement.

As an author, Lantos was lauded for his Holocaust memoir called Parallel Lines (Arcadia, 2007). His debut novel Closed Horizon was published in 2012 and a book aimed at younger readers that recounted his time in Bergen-Belsen, The Boy Who Didn't Want to Die, was published in 2023. His decision to write for children, having previously written for adults, was to ensure they would know what had happened and understand why it had happened.

Lantos was awarded the British Empire Medal (BEM) in the 2020 Birthday Honours for services to Holocaust education and awareness.
