= Albert Pulitzer =

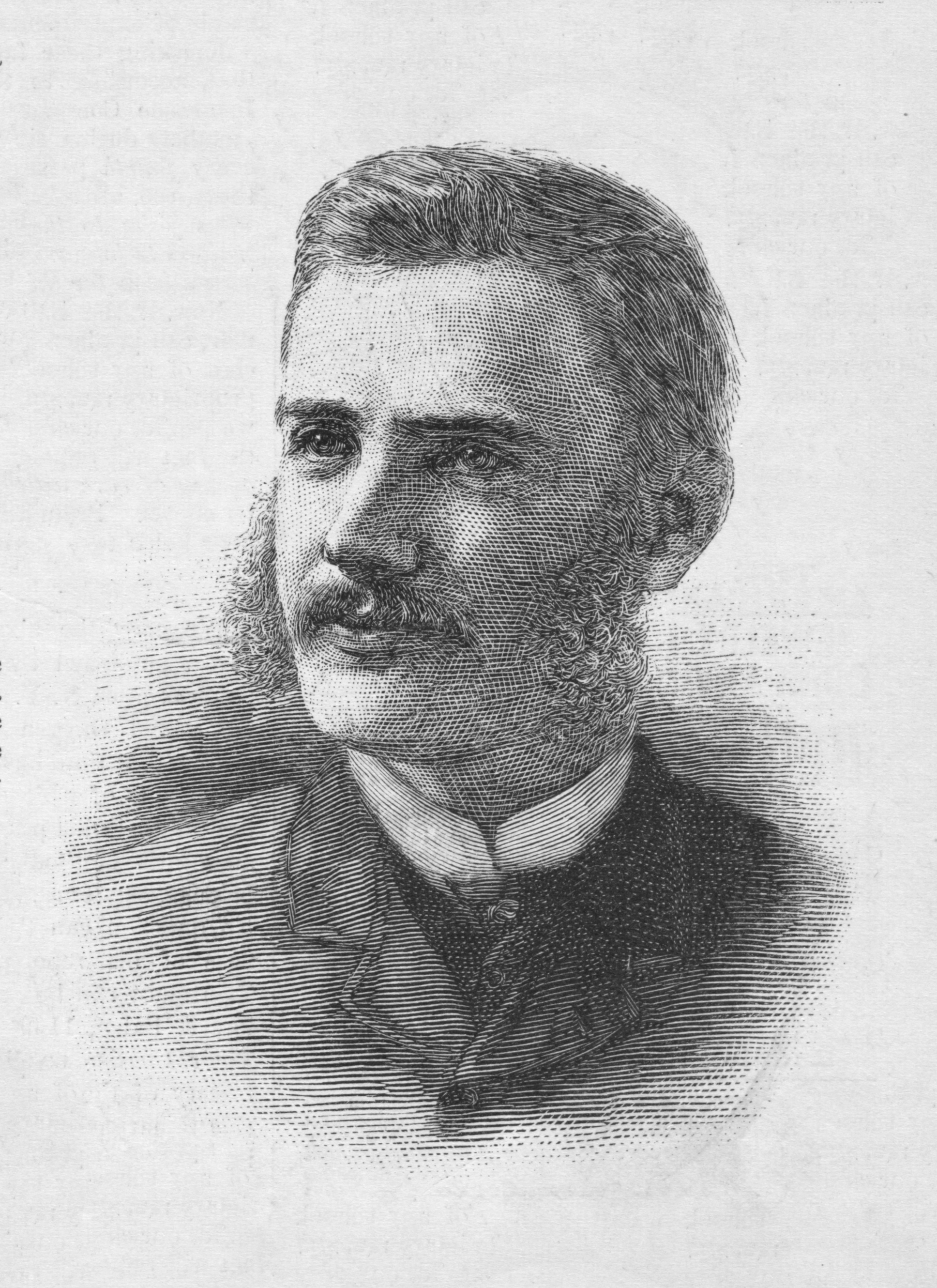
Albert Pulitzer

Albert Pulitzer (July 10, 1851 – October 3, 1909) was the younger brother of newspaper publisher Joseph Pulitzer. Pulitzer founded the New York Morning Journal in 1882, which he sold to John R. McLean, who soon after transferred the paper to William Randolph Hearst in 1895. He also founded Das Morgen Journal, a German-language version of the Journal, which Hearst also acquired in 1895.

Albert was born, like his brother, in Makó, Hungary. He emigrated to the United States when he was 16, and started work as a German teacher at Leavenworth High School in Kansas. After two years, he started working for an Illinois newspaper. He moved to New York City in 1871 and worked at the New York Sun and New York Herald, until founding the Journal. He wrote The Romance of Prince Eugene. An idyll of the Time of Napoleon 1. (2 Volumes, Dodd, Mead, NY 1895.) Suffering from neurasthenia, Albert committed suicide in Vienna (he had moved to Europe after he sold the Journal) on October 3, 1909. His son, Walter Pulitzer, who was an author and magazine publisher, died in 1926.

In 2010, author James McGrath Morris published a new biography of Joseph Pulitzer (Pulitzer: A Life in Politics, Print, and Power) which included new information from Albert Pulitzer's memoirs. These materials, which he tracked down in 2005, had been preserved by Albert's granddaughter Muriel.
