= Geza de Kaplany =

Hungarian-American murderer (born 1926)

Geza F. P. de Kaplany
- Born: Geza F. P. Kaplany de Kaplanyhaza; 27 June 1926; Makó, Kingdom of Hungary
- Other name: The Acid Doctor
- Education: University of Szeged
- Occupation: Medical doctor
- Criminal charge: Murder
- Criminal penalty: Life imprisonment
- Criminal status: Paroled
- Spouse: Hajna Piller (m. 1962; died 1962)

Geza de Kaplany (born 27 June 1926) is a Hungarian-born physician who emigrated to the United States in the late 1950s. In 1963, he was convicted of first-degree murder in California after mutilating his wife with a scalpel and corrosive strong acids, thus causing her death.

== Early life ==
De Kaplany was born to a wealthy family on 27 June 1926, in Makó, Hungary, where he was also raised. He lost sight in one eye during a beating by his father, who died in 1938. He studied medicine at the University of Szeged and graduated with honors in 1951. He went into practice in Budapest as a cardiologist, but clashed with officials in the Hungarian Revolution of 1956, fleeing after it failed. He visited England and Denmark, writing a book called Doctor in Revolt about his alleged experiences as a freedom fighter in Hungary.

He settled in Boston, intending to resume his practice, but discovered that his degree was not recognized. He retrained as an anesthesiologist, interning at Milwaukee Hospital from August 1957 to August 1958. He then attended Harvard and taught anesthesiology at Yale. He moved to San Jose, California where he worked at San Jose Hospital.

== Marriage ==
In June 1962, he met Hajna Piller, daughter of Olympic fencer György Piller, who was also from Hungary. She was a 25-year-old former fashion model, beauty queen, and showgirl at Bimbo's 365 Club. Despite Piller already being engaged to a Hungarian engineer, the two had a whirlwind courtship and married that August. A few weeks after their marriage, de Kaplany heard from a friend that his wife had continued dating her boyfriend.

== Murder ==
On the evening of 28 August 1962, de Kaplany carried out his plan to punish his wife for her supposed infidelity. He tied her to the bed in their apartment, played loud music and disfigured her body with a scalpel. He dabbed a mixture of hydrochloric, sulfuric and nitric acid in the cuts, causing her to suffer third degree corrosive burns over most of the front of her body. After three hours, he called police. He told police that he had wanted to destroy her beauty, but not kill her. She recovered enough to give a statement, but died on 30 September in St. Francis Memorial Hospital.

== Legal proceedings ==
De Kaplany's trial commenced on 9 January 1963. He was initially charged with attempted murder, and was later charged with murder by torture after his wife died. De Kaplany pleaded not guilty by reason of insanity. His lawyer, Edward de Vilbiss, claimed that he suffered from multiple personality disorder and that the crime was committed by his alter ego, "Pierre de la Roche." Prosecutor Louis P. Bergna brought a witness, Ruth Krueger, a former lover who testified otherwise. He was declared legally sane, though medically insane.

He was convicted of first-degree murder, but the testimony of a psychiatrist who claimed that de Kaplany had become a "paranoid schizophrenic with latent homosexual tendencies" because of abuse during his childhood prompted the jury to bring a verdict of life imprisonment on 1 March 1963. Superior Court Judge Raymond G. Callaghan formally sentenced him on 15 March. He was sent to California Institution for Men.

His license to practice was revoked by the California Board of Medical Examiners on 9 March 1964, for violating sections 2378 and 2383 (moral turpitude and unprofessional conduct) of the Business and Professions Code.

He appealed his conviction in the California state and federal courts, but the Ninth Circuit ultimately upheld his conviction in a 1976 opinion that issued after de Kaplany had already been granted parole and left the United States.

== Parole ==
In 1975, de Kaplany was granted parole in a controversial decision marked by accusations that postmortem photographs of his victim were removed from his file by Raymond Procunier, the chairman of the California state parole authority for men, prior to review of de Kaplany's case by the parole board. As a result, the ability to be paroled while under the sentence of life imprisonment was removed.

The parole board under Procunier allowed de Kaplany to travel to Taiwan on 13 November 1975, to work as a medical missionary doctor serving poor patients in a Catholic hospital in Lutsao. De Kaplany left the United States before his prosecutors and the general public knew he had been paroled. Negative public reaction followed, with legislators calling for Procunier's ouster. Procunier resigned the following year, citing "personal reasons".

De Kaplany worked at the Lutsao clinic for the next four years, and remarried. Tired of constant parole checks, he left Taiwan in late 1979 and dropped out of sight. When California corrections officials discovered he was missing, a warrant was issued for his arrest and his name was submitted to Interpol. However, a 2002 investigation by the San Jose Mercury News indicated that California officials were made aware of de Kaplany's whereabouts several times over the next few years, and once even contacted him to warn him, as required by law, about an anonymous threat on his life, yet failed to take any steps to extradite him.

== Later life ==
De Kaplany re-surfaced briefly in Munich, Germany in December 1980, where a hospital fired him from a staff position after a German women's magazine happened to publish an article on infamous crimes including his case.

For a time in 1983, he worked in the U.S. Army Health Clinic in Grafenwöhr, Bavaria.

In 2002, reporters for the San Jose Mercury News located the 75-year-old de Kaplany and interviewed him at his home in Bad Zwischenahn, Germany. Two years prior, he had become a naturalized German citizen, making it impossible to extradite him for the parole violation.

== Sources ==
- Carl Sifakis (1 January 2001). The encyclopedia of American crime (2nd ed.). Facts On File, Incorporated. ISBN 978-0-8160-4633-1.
- Max Haines (1993). "Dr. Geza de Kaplany". Doctors who kill. Toronto Sun Pub. Corp. pp. 173–. ISBN 978-1-895735-04-8.
- David K. Frasier (1996). Murder Cases of the Twentieth Century: Biographies and Bibliographies of 280 Convicted Or Accused Killers. McFarland. pp. 115–17. ISBN 978-0-7864-0184-0.
- Jane Dabaghian (June 1975). Mirror of man: readings in sociology and literature. Little, Brown. pp. 57–. ISBN 9780316170420.
- Arpad Hellebrant (ed.). A magyar paedagogiai irodalom 1905-1922 [The bibliography of the Hungarian educational papers between 1905-1922] (in Hungarian). p. 430. "Kaplany Geza. Pedagogiai eloiteletek es a kozepiskola reformja, Huszad."
- Spears, Margo (2007). "My Sheriff's Office Years 1962-1980" (PDF). Lifescapes. pp. 1–7.
