= Marko Milošević (football manager) =

Bosnian footballer and manager

Marko Milošević (coach)
Personal information
- Full name: Marko Milošević (coach)
- Date of birth: 17 June 1952
- Place of birth: Romanovci, SR Bosnia and Herzegovina, SFR Yugoslavia
- Date of death: 24 October 2025 (aged 73)
- Place of death: Banja Luka, Bosnia and Herzegovina
- Position: Midfielder

Youth career
- 1964-1968: Rijeka

Senior career*
Years	Team	Apps	(Gls)
1969-1970	Opatija	49	(16)
1971	Šibenik	14	(2)
1972-1976	Orijent	109	(16)
1977	Rudar Velenje	16	(3)
1977-1980	Jadran Poreč	96	(18)
1980	Rayo Vallecano		
1980-1987	Jadran Poreč	109	(21)

Managerial career
- 1997–1998: Sloga Trn
- 1999–2000: Omladinac Banja Luka
- 2000–2002: Sloga Trn
- 2003–2004: Krila Krajine
- 2004–2005: FC Szeged
- 2006–2007: Sloga Trn
- 2007–2008: FC Csongrad
- 2008–2009: FC Fortuna Ujpest
- 2009–2010: Laktaši
- 2011–2013: Makói
- 2014–2016: Zlaté Moravce
- 2017–2018: Jedinstvo Žeravica
- 2019: FC Meerfeld
- 2021: Rudar Prijedor
- 2022: FC SV HO NIE
- * Club domestic league appearances and goals

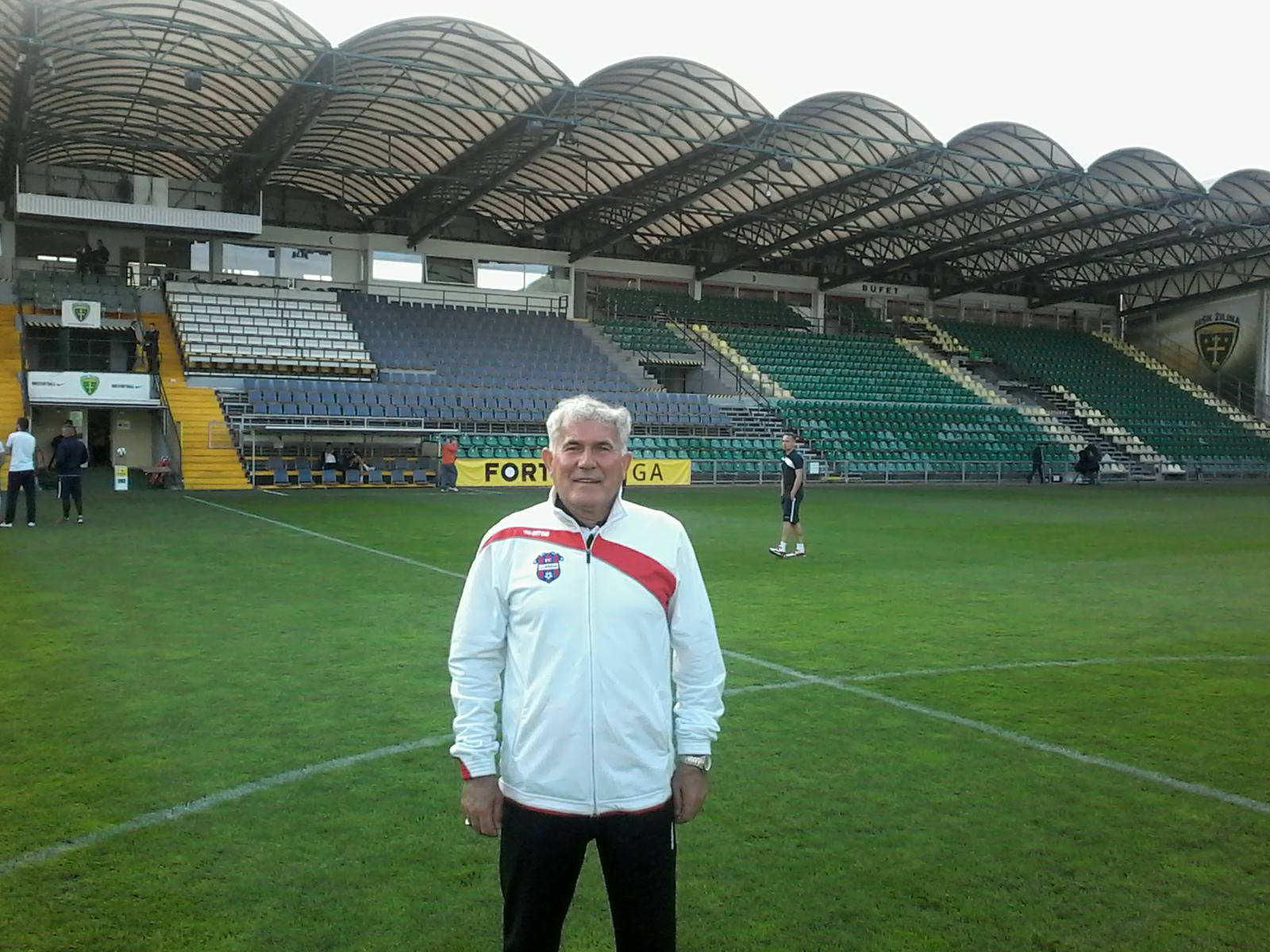

Marko Milošević (17 June 1952 — 24 October 2025) is a former Bosnian footballer and manager.

== Managerial career ==
After concluding his playing career Milošević was named head coach of Sloga Trn in Banja Luka, after that he changed clubs like FK Omladinac Banja Luka, Krila Krajine, FK Laktaši. He was also the coach of many Hungarian teams like FC Szeged, FC Csongrad, FC Fortuna Ujpest and Makó FC. In the year 2014 he accepted the offer of Slovak First Football League team, FC ViOn Zlaté Moravce.
