= List of Jews in religion =

This is a list of notable Jews in religion.

== Biblical figures ==
See: List of Jewish Biblical figures.

== High Priests ==
See: List of High Priests of Israel.

== Rabbis ==
See: List of rabbis.

=== Rosh yeshivas ===
See: List of rosh yeshivas.

== Karaite Jewish Hakhamim ==
See: List of Karaite Jews.

== Religious figures by country ==
=== Germany ===
==== Scholars ====
- Felix Adler
- Hugo Bergmann (born in Prague)
- Max Bodenheimer
- David Cassel
- Ismar Elbogen
- Emil Ludwig Fackenheim
- Jonas Fränkel
- Heinrich Graetz, Jewish historian (born in Posen)
- Manuel Joël, Jewish philosopher
- Isaak Markus Jost, Jewish historian
- Marcus Kalisch, Biblical scholar
- Jakob Klatzkin
- Israel Lewy
- Moses Mendelssohn, Jewish Enlightenment philosopher
- David Rosin
- Gershom Scholem, Jewish scholar and historian
- Ernst Simon
- Friedrich Weinreb (born in Lemberg)
- Benedict Zuckermann
- Leopold Zunz, Jewish scholar

==== Other ====
- Ayya Khema, Buddhist teacher (born Jewish)
- Adolf Lasson
  - Georg Lasson
- Johannes Pfefferkorn, antisemitic controversialist (born Jewish)
- Friedrich Adolf Philippi
- Johann Peter Spaeth (Moses Germanus Ashkenazi), a Christian German Proselyte
- Edith Stein, canonized nun, Holocaust victim (born Jewish)

=== Hungary ===
- Joseph Breuer
- Henrik Bródy
- J. H. Hertz, Chief Rabbi of Great Britain
- Abraham Hochmuth
- Sanz-Klausenberger rebbe from Kolozsvár (now Cluj-Napoca, Romania)
- Ludwig Lichtenstein
- Yosef Greenwald, Puppa rebbe
- Sándor Scheiber, rabbi and director of the Budapest Rabbinical Seminary
- Solomon Marcus Schiller-Szinessy, rabbi and first Jewish professor in Cambridge
- Isaac Tyrnau
- Joachim Jacob Unger
- Wahrmann family
- Michoel Ber Weissmandl
- Béla Wenckheim

=== United Kingdom ===
==== Other religious leaders ====
- Selig Brodetsky, President of the British Board of Deputies
- Barnett Janner, President of the British Board of Deputies
- Greville Janner, President of the British Board of Deputies
- Ewen Montagu, President of the United Synagogue
- Claude Montefiore, co-founder of British Liberal Judaism
- Anthony Rothschild, first president of the United Synagogue

=== United States ===
==== Rebbetzins ====
- Rebbetzin Esther Jungreis, Hungarian born founder of Hineni
- Chaya Mushka Schneerson, rebbetzin of Chabad

== Other religious leaders (including Jews associated with religions outside of Judaism) ==
- Apostles, the "Twelve Apostles", first followers of Jesus
- Ram Dass, modern American Hindu author
- Jacob Frank, self-proclaimed messiah in Poland, founder of Frankists
- Maurice Frydman Polish Jew who lived in India and was involved in translating Nisargadatta's "I am That." Was close to Gandhi and Nehru
- Jesus, the central figure of Christianity
- John the Baptist, revered by Christians
- Jean-Marie Lustiger, French Cardinal (raised Catholic)
- John Joseph O'Connor
- Saint Peter, considered the first Pope
- Saul of Tarsus, early Christian leader
- Edith Stein, Catholic nun, Holocaust victim
- St. Teresa of Avila, Catholic saint (parents were Conversos)
