= Joel (surname) =

Joel is a surname. Notable people with the surname include:

- Joel family, a British family of brothers who became rich from diamond and gold mining in South Africa
- Alex Joel, first American Civil Liberties Protection Officer for the U.S. Office of the Director of National Intelligence
- Alexa Ray Joel (born 1985), American singer-songwriter and daughter of Billy Joel
- Alexander Joel (conductor) (born 1971), British/German pianist and conductor
- Billy Joel (born 1949), American singer-songwriter
- Charlotte Joël (1882/87–1943), German photographer
- David Joël (1815–1882), German rabbi and scholar
- Dennis Joel, (born 1947), American former actor and singer
- Diederrick Joel (born 1993), Cameroonian footballer playing in Brazil
- Georg Joel (1898–1981), German Nazi Party official
- Grace Joel (1865–1924), New Zealand artist
- Jens Joel (born 1978), Danish politician
- Karl Joel (philosopher) (1864–1934), German philosopher
- Karl Amson Joel (1889–1982), German Jewish textile merchant and manufacturer
- Lawrence Joel (1928–1984), American Vietnam War medic and Medal of Honor recipient
- Lewis Joel (1824–1899), British diplomat
- Manuel Joël (1826–1890), Silesian Jewish philosopher
- Nicolas Joel (born 1953), French opera director and administrator of opera houses
- Richard Joel (born 1950), president of Yeshiva University
- Robert Joel (1944–1992), American actor
