= David Cassel =

German historian and Jewish theologian (1818-1893)

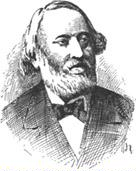
- David Cassel, from the 1901-1906 Jewish Encyclopedia, now in the public domain.
- Born: 7 March 1818; Gross-Glogau, Silesia, Prussia
- Died: 22 January 1893 (aged 74); Berlin, Prussia, German Empire

David Cassel (7 March 1818 – 22 January 1893) was a German historian and Jewish theologian.

== Life ==
Cassel was born in Gross-Glogau, a city in Prussian Silesia with a large Jewish community. He graduated from its gymnasium. His brother was Selig Cassel.

Cassel's name is intimately connected with the founders of Jewish science in Germany—Zunz, Geiger, Steinschneider, Frankel, and others. In appreciating his scholarship in Jewish literature it must not be forgotten that he was born in a city in which Jewish learning had been maintained at a very high standard, and which has given to the world many scholars: Salomon Munk, Joseph Zedner, Michael Sachs, Heymann Arnheim, and others.

Cassel became a student at the Berlin University, where he attended the lectures of the orientalist Julius Heinrich Petermann, the philosopher Friedrich Adolf Trendelenburg, the philologist August Boeckh, and others. He, besides, maintained very friendly relations with Moritz Steinschneider, Heimann Jolowicz, Leser Landshuth, and Paul de Lagarde. During the whole time of his university studies he supported himself by giving lessons; and having thus experienced all the bitterness of poverty, he became later one of the founders of the Hülfs-Verein für Jüdische Studierende, a society for assisting poor Jewish students in Berlin, which is still in existence.

Cassel began his career as an author with his doctor's thesis on "Die Psalmenüberschriften" (published in the "Literaturblatt des Orients," Leipzig, 1840). He received his rabbinical diploma in 1843 from Jacob Joseph Oettinger and Zecharias Frankel, but never accepted, a rabbinical position, although he possessed a decided talent for the pulpit, as may be seen from his "Sabbath-Stunden zur Belehrung und Erbauung" (Berlin, 1868), a collection of 52 homilies on the Pentateuch, originally delivered as Sabbath lectures in a school for boys. In 1846 Cassel became principal of an educational institute called the "Dina-Nauen-Stift," in which position he remained until 1879. He was, besides, in 1850 and 1851 teacher of religion in Berlin at the Congregational School for Jewish Girls, and from 1852 to 1867 at the Jewish school for boys. From 1862 to 1873 he was also a teacher at the Jewish Normal School. In 1872, when the Lehranstalt für die Wissenschaft des Judenthums ("Hochschule") was established in Berlin, Cassel was elected one of the docents. He died in Berlin.

== Works ==
Cassel wrote a great number of valuable books, besides many essays for the Jewish magazines. Some of his works were written mainly for educational purposes; e.g., the above-mentioned "Sabbath-Stunden" and the following:

- "Leitfaden für den Unterricht in der Jüdischen Gesch. und Litteratur," Berlin, 1868 (translated into various languages);
- "Gesch. der Jüdischen Litteratur," 2 vols., Berlin, 1872–73, dealing only with Biblical literature;
- "Hebräisch-Deutsches Wörterbuch," etc., Berlin, 1871, last ed., 1891;
- "Lehrbuch der Jüdischen Gesch. und Litteratur," Leipzig, 1879; 2d ed., Berlin, 1896.

In addition to these he edited, or contributed introductions and notes to, several scientific works of great value, of which the following may be mentioned:

- "Cat. Hebräischer Schriften," Latin part by himself, and Hebrew by Rebenstein (Bernstein), Berlin, 1845;
- David Conforte's "Ḳore ha-Dorot," a biographical and bibliographical lexicon of Jewish scholars with introduction and notes, Berlin, 1846;
- "Zikron Yehudah," responsa of Judah ben Asher, published by Rosenberg, with introduction and notes by Cassel, Berlin, 1846;
- "Teshubot Geonim Ḳadmonim," responsa of the earlier Geonim, edited from a Berlin manuscript, with an introduction by J. L. Rapoport, in "He-Ḥaluẓ," Berlin, 1848, viii.138;
- the "Yesod 'Olam" of Isaac Israeli, an astronomical work edited by B. Goldberg and L. Rosenkranz, with an introduction and a German translation by Cassel, Berlin, 1848; published by Rosenberg with notes and references by Cassel, Berlin, 1856;
- Index to De Rossi's "Dizionario Storico," Leipzig, 1846;
- the "Cuzari" of Judah ha-Levi, with a German introduction and translation and very numerous explanatory and critical notes, which fully testify to Cassel's erudition in Jewish-Arabic philosophy, Leipzig, 1840–53, Berlin, 1869 (in this work Cassel was assisted to some extent by H. Jolowicz);
- "Meor 'Enayim" of Azariah dei Rossi—a classical edition, Vilna, 1866;
- the Apocrypha, translated into German from the Greek, Berlin, 1864–71;
- "Die Pesach-Haggadah", with German introduction, translation, and critical notes (latest edition, Berlin, 1895);
- "Grammatik der Hebräischen Sprache" of H. Arnheim (died 1870), with introduction, notes, and additions by Cassel, Berlin, 1872.

Cassel further wrote pamphlets on questions of the day, such as: "Woher und Wohin? Zur Verständigung über Jüdische Reformbestrebungen," Berlin, 1845;

- "Die Cultusfrage in der Jüdischen Gemeinde von Berlin," Berlin, 1856, a defense of his friend Michael Sachs against the attacks by the Orthodox;
- "Offener Brief eines Juden an Prof. Dr. Virchow," Berlin, 1869;
- "Joseph Caro und das Buch Maggid Mesharim," published in the "Jahresbericht" of the Berlin Hochschule, Berlin, 1888, in which he proves, against Grätz, that this book was not written by Caro.

Cassel is also the author of all the articles dealing with Judaism and Jewish literature in Brockhaus' "Konversations-Lexikon". He also wrote articles for the publications of the Society of Hebrew Literature of London.

Finally, it must be mentioned that Cassel, while still a young man, conceived the plan of publishing a Jewish encyclopedia containing everything of interest to Judaism. With the assistance of M. Steinschneider he composed the "Plan der Real-Encyclopädie des Judenthums," Krotoschin, 1844; but, inasmuch as Jewish studies were still in their infancy, the plan, though pursued for some time, could not be carried out.
