= Jakob Koppel Fränkel =

Jakob Koppel Fränkel (1600 - April 17, 1670) was a wealthy Austrian-Jewish banker and court Jew.

== Biography ==
Jakob Koppel ha-Levy Fränkel was born in Höchstadt an der Aisch, Germany to Jeremiah Isaak ha-Levy and his wife Ritschl. From 1640 and onward, Fränkel lived in Vienna, and owned several houses there and was considered the richest Jew in the city. As an imperial court Jew in Lower Austria, he was a buyer of sheep's wool and supplied the border troops with cloth. He died shortly before the expulsion of the Viennese Jews in 1670, in Vienna, where he is buried. Jakob Koppel's three sons, David Isaac Seckel, Israel and Enoch, paid 4,000 guilders to the Austrian government to keep their father's grave in Vienna, and further paid 20,000 guilders to the emperor in order to dispute any claims from creditors. The Fränkel family immigrated to Fürth, where they continued the family bank and rose to great prominence. Many members of the family later became rabbis and rabbinic scholars such as R. David ben Naphtali Fränkel and R. Zecharias Frankel.
