= Grosse Hamburger Strasse =

Street in Berlin, Germany

Große Hamburger Straße
- Grosse Hamburger Strasse
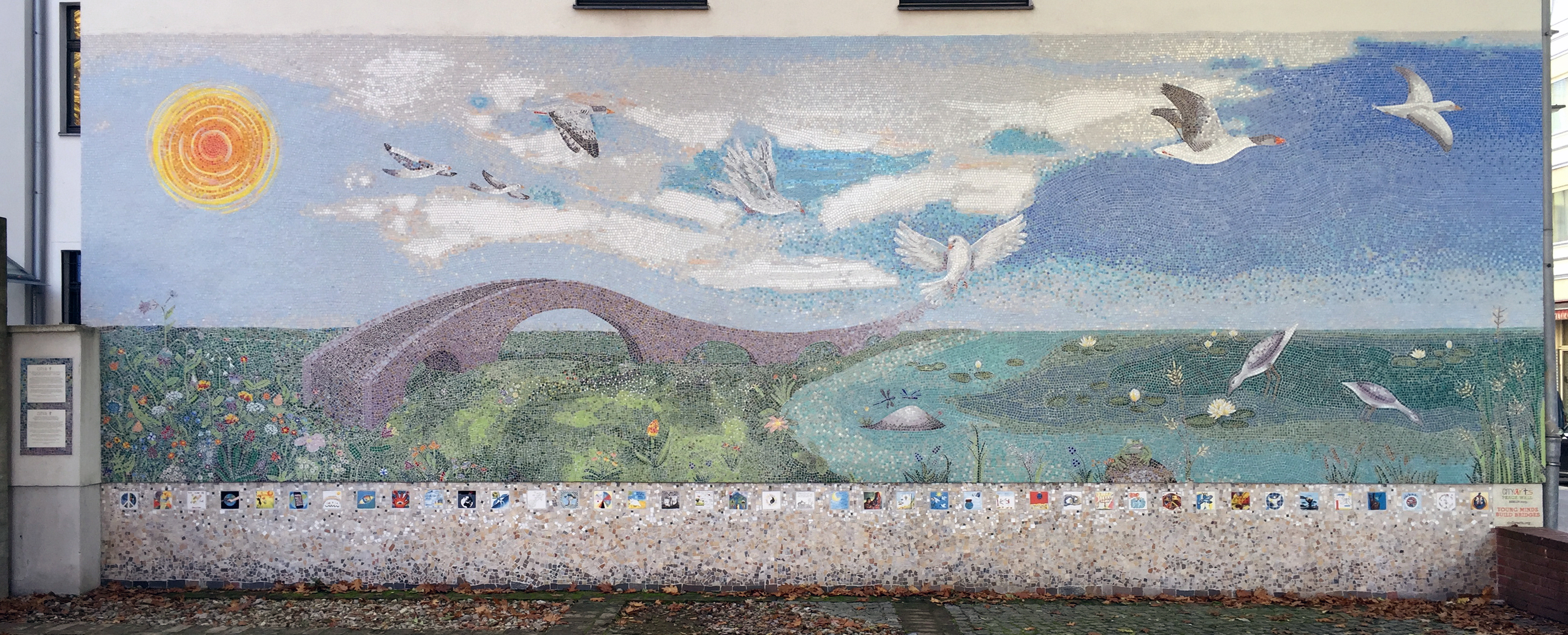
- Mosaic at Grosse Hamburger Strasse 26
- Interactive map of Große Hamburger Straße
- Former names: Hamburger Straße; (1723–1737)
- Namesake: Hamburg
- Type: Street
- Length: 400 m (1,300 ft)
- Location: Berlin, Germany
- Quarter: Mitte
- Nearest metro station: Hackescher Markt
- Coordinates: 52°31′32″N 13°23′56″E
- North end: Koppenplatz; Auguststraße
- Major junctions: Sophienstraße; Krausnickstraße
- South end: Oranienburger Straße

Construction
- Completion: c. 1700

Große Hamburger Straße, or Grosse Hamburger Strasse (see ß), located in the Mitte district of Berlin, has been an important site for Jewish Berliners. There was a school for boys, an old age home, and a cemetery operated by the Jewish community before World War II. The area, used as a deportation site during the Nazi regime of World War II, was destroyed during the war. Since then, the cemetery was restored and there is a school for boys again. A green area is a memorial to the Holocaust, with sculptures, a memorial stone, and plaques. It has been given monumental protection.

== Grosse Hamburger Strasse ==
After World War II the buildings and ruins of Grosse Hamburger Strasse, the cemetery became a park and was given monumental protection. Plaques, a memorial stone, and sculptures were erected throughout the cemetery, the school for boys and the site of the old age home.

== History ==
In the 1500s, Jews had lived in Berlin, but by the mid- to late-1500s they were gone. The Jewish community that inhabited the area around Grosse Hamburger Strasse was populated in 1671 with a fraction of the people who had been expelled from their homes in Vienna. Frederick William, Elector of Brandenburg had issued an edict to allow 50 families to move to Berlin in around 1671. They also were given land for a cemetery, now called the Old Jewish Cemetery, with burials beginning in 1672.

=== Pre-World War II buildings and structures ===
External image
- Students and people from the old age home at Grosse Hamburger Strasse school yard during a performance of "Max and Moritz" in 1937

==== Cemetery ====
The Grosse Hamburger Strasse cemetery, called the Old Jewish Cemetery, was the oldest Jewish cemetery in Berlin, being built in 1672. Moses Mendelssohn was interred there in 1786. Other noted individuals buried there include Veitel Heine Ephraim, David Hirschel Fränkel, Markus Herz, and Jacob Herz Beer. Burials were not allowed within the Berlin Customs Wall (walls that encircled the city from 1737 to 1860), after the passage of the Prussian hygiene ordinance of 1794.

In the early 19th century, the cemetery was filled with more than 2,600 burials. In 1943, the Gestapo had the graves destroyed. Slit trenches created during the war were established throughout the cemetery grounds, destroying gravesites. Then, mass graves were established in the cemetery After the war, in the 1980s, any burials that were not destroyed during the war were moved to the Weißensee Jewish cemetery until the Grosse Hamburger Strasse cemetery was restored by the Jewish community and Berlin Senate. A copy of the tomb of Moses Mendelssohn was erected in 1990. Then, in 2009, the burials placed at Weißensee were returned.

==== Old age home ====
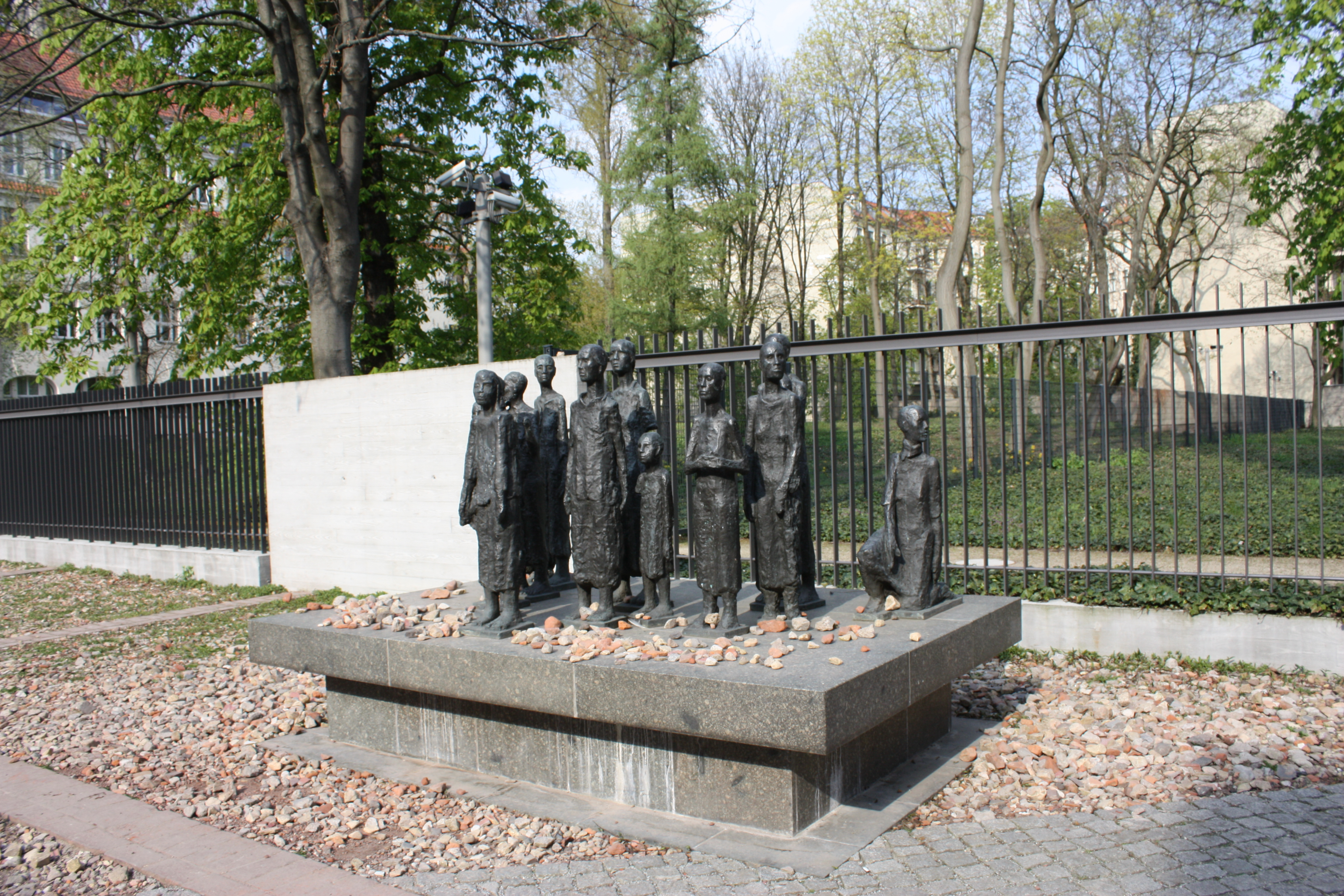
A Jewish memorial on Grosse Hamburger Strasse, located outside a property used by the Nazis as a detention centere for people awaiting transportation to concentration camps

In 1844, the Grosse Hamburger Strasse old home was built. In 1942, the building was redesigned to be used to process Jewish people to be deported to Nazi concentration camps and as a prison for resistance fighters and Jewish refugees. In the meantime, residents were moved to Theresienstadt. The building was destroyed in 1943.

==== School for boys ====
A school for boys was operated until 1942 when the building became a Nazi security point for the collection point. The building became a working school again in 1992.

=== World War II collection point ===
In 1941, Nazis established a collection point at Grosse Hamburger Strasse for Jews to be deported from the city. It became the main collection point in Berlin. The school for boys and old age home were renovated for use by the Nazis. Jewish people were processed and sent to extermination camps or ghettos as part of The Holocaust. They were forcefully taken from their homes and brought to this collection point. More than 50,000 people were sent initially to Nazi concentration camps at Kaunas, Łódź, Minsk, Riga, and Theresienstadt. Jewish people were sent to death camps, like Auschwitz-Birkenau, after July 1942.

External image
- Image of Gad Beck and friends, taken by Manfred Lewin in 1941

Written to a boy named Gad who went to the collection point, wearing a borrowed Hitler Youth uniform, to try to save his boyfriend named Manfred Lewin,

A void opens within me
Spirit and body suddenly are lame
The time that follows is torture
In which I seek out the strength to go
on living.

Often I see myself standing at the
edge of an abyss
Felt my utter abandonment
And the dizziness when I left my eyes
look down
And the sudden draining of blood
from my cheeks. (Note: After searching for his friend after the war, Gad learned that Manfred's entire family, the Lewins died at Auschwitz. There is an online exhibit about the friends at the United States Holocaust Memorial Museum.)
