= Csurgó =

- Town
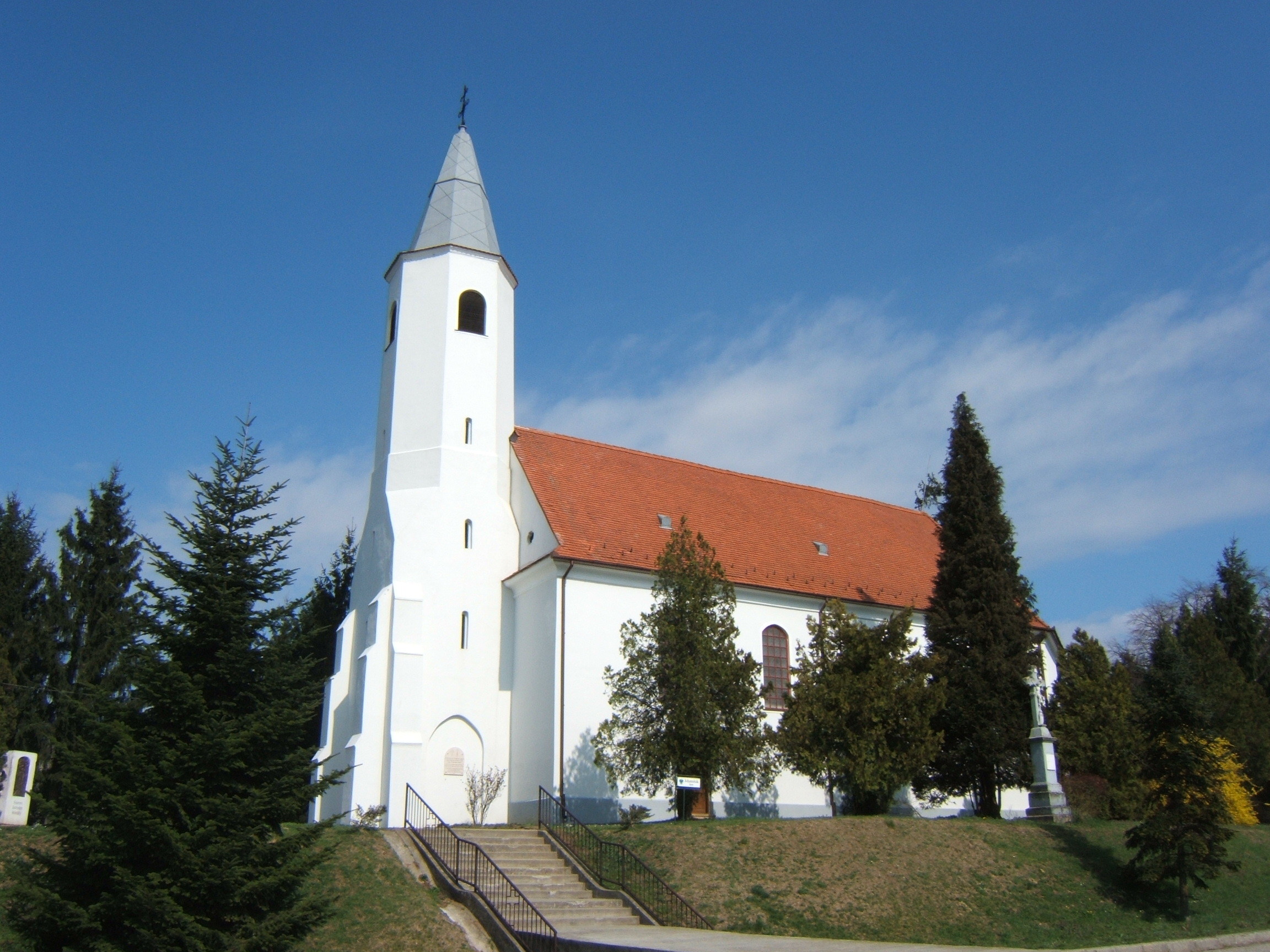
- Szentlélek-templom (English: Holy Spirit Church) in Csurgó

- Flag Coat of arms

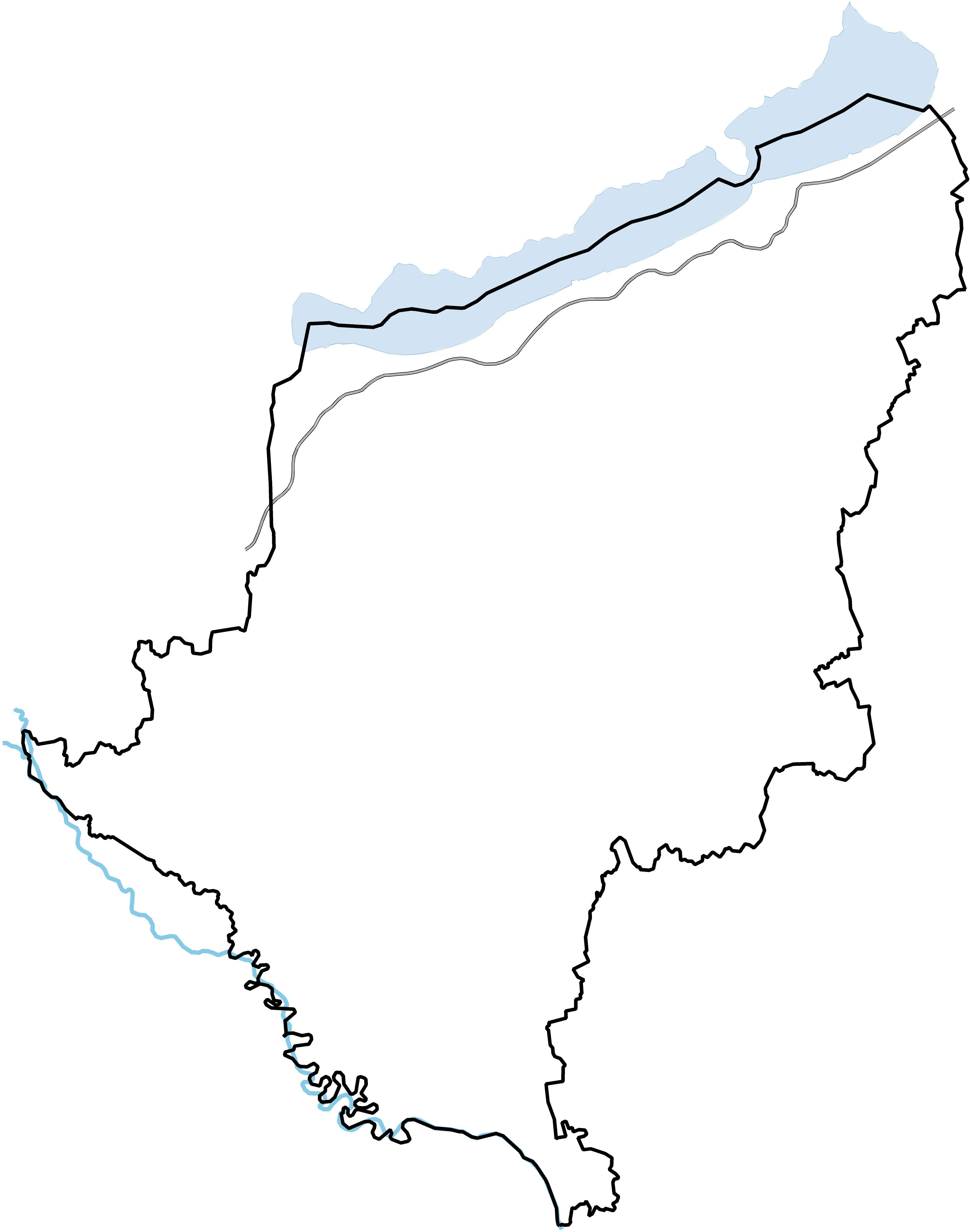
- Location of Csurgó Csurgó (Hungary)
- Coordinates: 46.256978°N 17.097975°E
- Country: Hungary
- Region: Southern Transdanubia
- County: Somogy
- District: Csurgó
- RC Diocese: Kaposvár

Area
  - Total: 59.6 km^{2} (23.0 sq mi)

Population (2017)
  - Total: 4,806
  - Density: 80.6/km^{2} (209/sq mi)
- Demonym: csurgói
- Time zone: UTC+1 (CET)
  - Summer (DST): UTC+2 (CEST)
- Postal code: 8840
- Area code: (+36) 82
- Patron Saint: Holy Spirit
- NUTS 3 code: HU232
- MP: László Szászfalvi (KDNP)
- Website: Csurgó Online

Csurgó (formerly Somogy-Csurgó; Croatian: Čurguj or Čurgov) is a town in Somogy County, Hungary, and the seat of Csurgó District.

The settlement is part of the Balatonboglár wine region.

== Geography ==
It lies on the southwestern part of Somogy County, near the Hungarian-Croatian border. Here meets the Öreghegy (English: Old Mountain) and the Újhegy (English: New Mountain) in Northwest, the Inner Somogy Hill Range in the Northeast and the River Drava in the South. The town can be approached by car or train. It lies on the Dombóvár-Gyékényes Railway Line.

== History ==
The territory of Csurgó was already inhabited in prehistoric times according to archaeological finds. During the Roman times this place was on the road which connected Pannonia province to the Adriatic Sea. Csurgó was first mentioned in the establishing charter of the Abbey of Zalavár in 1019 when Saint Stephen of Hungary donated the village and its goods to the Benedictine monks. During the Árpád era it was one of the lands of the free royal swineherds. Then later the sister of Béla III, Margit gave it to the Crusaders. They settled on the so-called Felső-Csurgó (English: Upper Csurgo) part of the village on a hill in a marsh. Then later the Order of Malta arrived on that place. The Johanniter Order founded their first monastery between 1217 and 1226 which served as a fortress, hospital and church. According to the legends Béla IV fled through Csurgó after the Battle of Mohi where he stayed for a night and drank from the Holy Mary Well. Csurgó was given market town rights on September 28, 1405, by Sigismund Luxemburg. Its castle was built in the 15th century but was demolished in the 18th century. There was also a church built in the 13th century which was repeatedly rebuilt since 1731. Sebestyén Tinódi Lantos moved here in 1543 and stayed for two years after his lord was captured by the Turks. During the Turkish occupation the town lost most of its residents.

In the beginning of the 18th century Csurgó was almost empty and belonged to the Festetics family who decided to revive the settlement. They allowed Hungarians, Germans, Croats and Slovaks to settle in the village. Its Calvinist secondary school was founded in 1792. Also, the famous Hungarian poet, Mihály Csokonai Vitéz taught there between the May 26, 1799, and February 17, 1800. He finished his well-known work, Dorottya there. between 1804 and 1809 Csurgó belonged to György Festetics.

Csurgó became market town again in 1850. Since 1896 he operates the first training school in Somogy County. The town became seat of the Csurgó District in 1871. The section of the train line connecting Budapest to Fiume (today Rijeka, Croatia) near Csurgó was finished in 1872. It became third time a town in 1989.

== Main sights ==
- Town Museum
- Szentlélek-templom (English: Holy Spirit church) - built in the 13th century, later rebuilt in Baroque style, the tower is in Romantic style
- Csokonai Reformed Secondary School - built in the 18th century in Eclecticism
- Csokonai Community House
- Town Library
- Sport Hall
- Meller Mansion - built in the 19th century in Eclecticism with Secession decoration
- Basa Well - built in the 16th century by Damat Ibrahim Pasha
- Lake Zis - famous recreational and hiking spot

== Culture ==
The Hungarian folk song A juhásznak jól van dolga was collected in Alsok (part of Csurgó) in 1898 by Béla Vikár.

== Twin towns – sister cities ==
Csurgó is twinned with:

- Aumale, France
- Cristuru Secuiesc, Romania
- Đurđevac, Croatia
- Haimhausen, Germany
- Vráble, Slovakia
- Vrsar, Croatia

== Notable residents ==
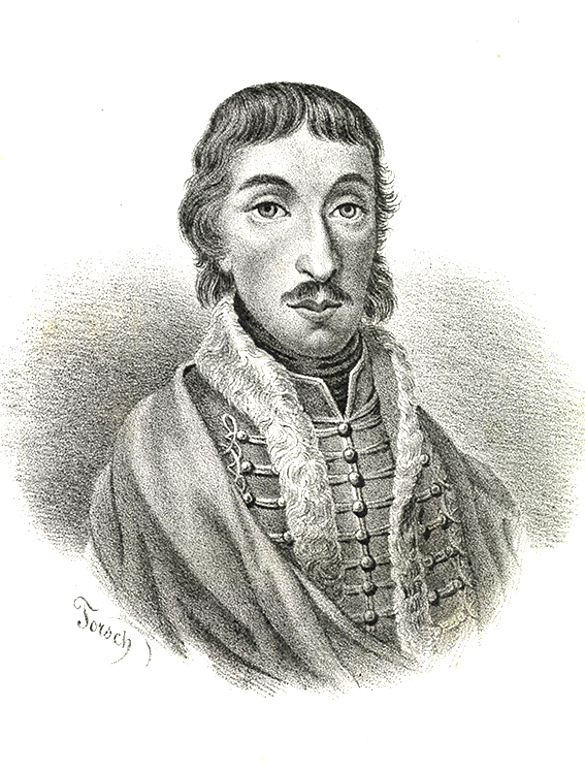
Mihály Csokonai Vitéz taught here in the secondary school between 1798 and 1799.

- Mordecai Benet born 1753, a Talmudist and chief rabbi of Moravia
- László Szászfalvi (born 1961), Hungarian Calvinist pastor, theologian, politician, mayor of Csurgó (1990 – 2003, 2006 – 2010)
- Ludwig Lichtschein (1820 – 1886), Hungarian rabbi
- László Faragó (1906 – 1980) military historian, journalist
- Antal Stevanecz (1861 – 1921), Slovene teacher and writer
- Attila Bárkányi (born 1947), Hungarian designer
- Ferenc Beleváry (1801 – 1878), Hungarian Reformed pastor
- Sebestyén Tinódi Lantos (c. 1510 – 1556), Hungarian lyricist, epic poet, political historian, minstrel
- Mihály Csokonai Vitéz (1773 – 1805), Hungarian poet, teacher
- Ernő Kiss Angyal (1899 – 1968), Hungarian composer
- Elemér Nádasdi Sárközy (1900 – 1988), Hungarian painter, restaurateur
- Máté Lajos Csurgói (1931 – 2001), Hungarian painter, graphic designer
- Lajos Nacsa, Hungarian Catholic priest
- Dezső Laky (1887–1962), Hungarian statistician, economist, minister
- József Bokor (1843 – 1917), Hungarian philosopher, author
- Magda Hadik (1914 – 2004), Hungarian sculptor

== Gallery ==
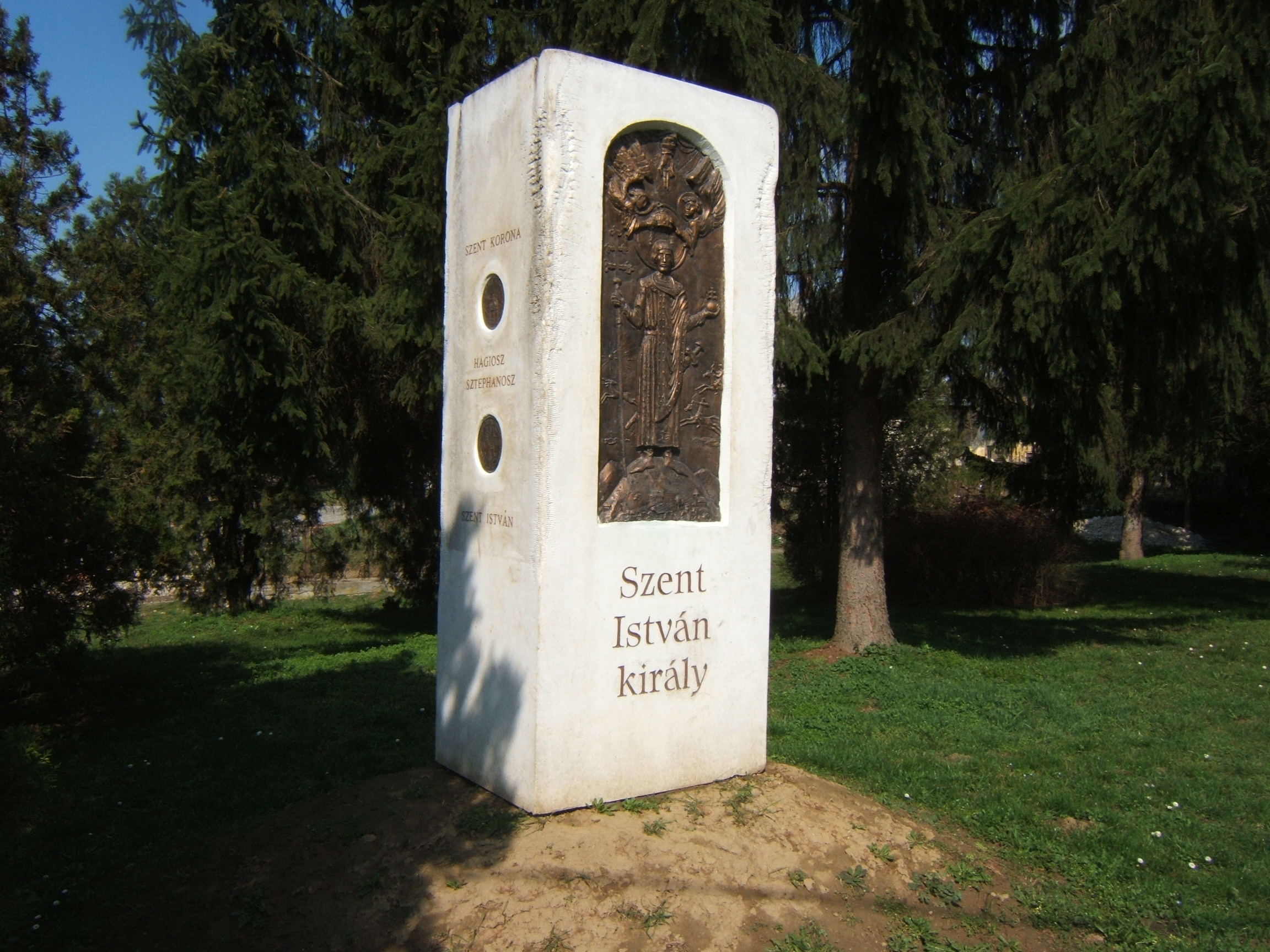
Statue of Saint Stephen of Hungary

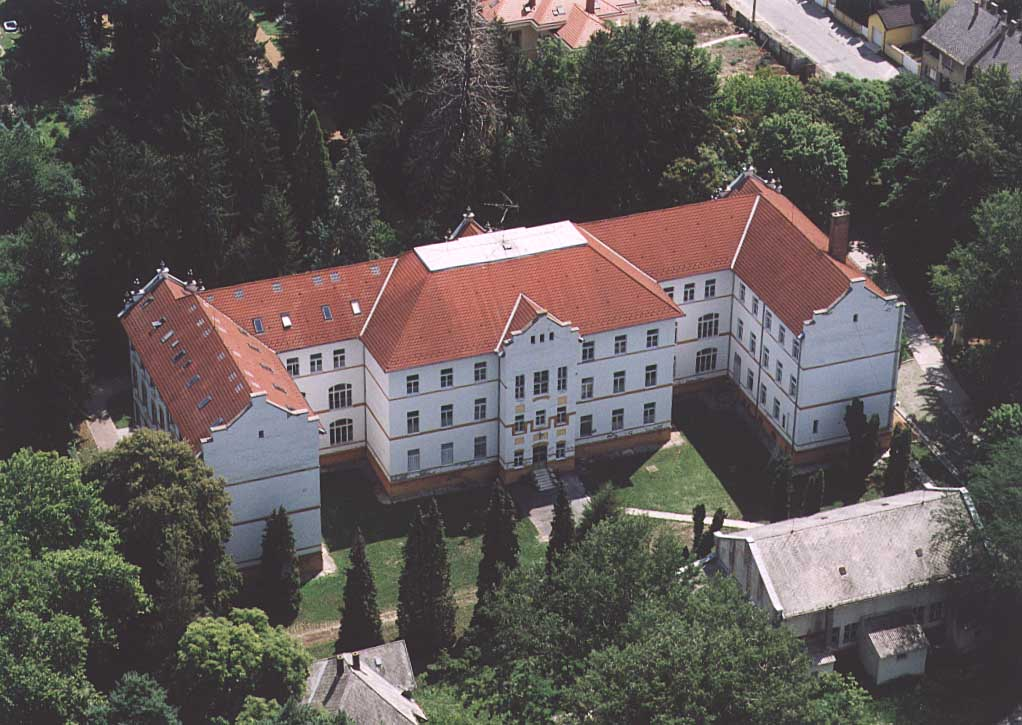
Building of the Csokonai Secondary School

== See also ==
- Slovenes in Somogy
