= Karl Joel =

Karl Joel may refer to:

- Karl Joel (philosopher) (1864–1934), German philosopher
- Karl Amson Joel (1889–1982), German-Jewish textile merchant and manufacturer
