= Benedict Zuckermann =

German scientist

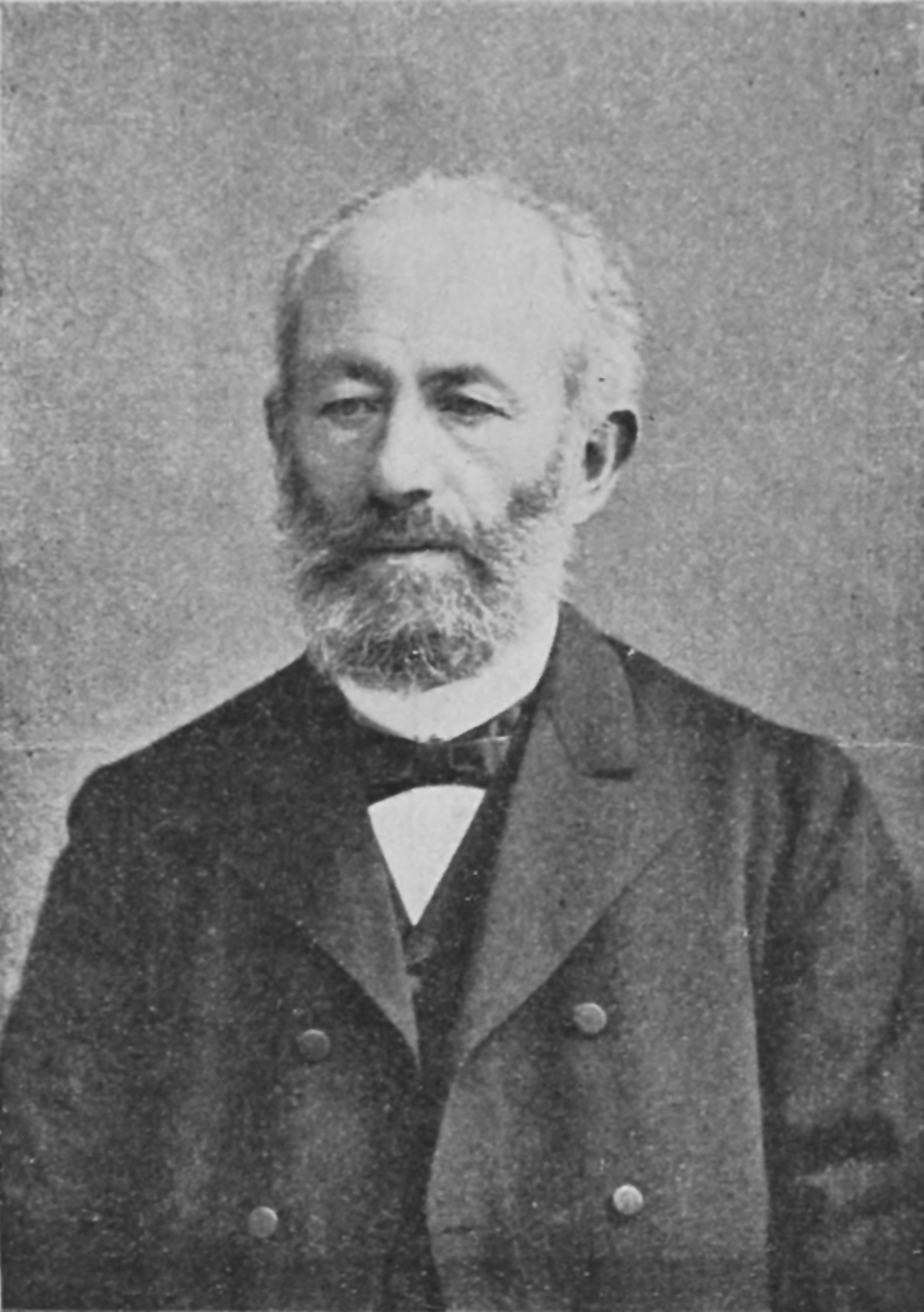
- Born: October 9, 1818; Breslau, Province of Silesia, Kingdom of Prussia
- Died: December 17, 1891 (aged 73); Breslau, Province of Silesia, Kingdom of Prussia
- Known for: Research on the Jewish calendar; Das Mathematische im Talmud; seminary library catalogue
- Scientific career
- Fields: Jewish calendar studies; mathematics; chronology
- Institutions: Jewish Theological Seminary of Breslau

Benedict Zuckermann (9 October 1818 – 17 December 1891) was a Jewish scholar, mathematician, calendrist, and long-serving teacher at the Jewish Theological Seminary of Breslau. Educated in both traditional Jewish and secular disciplines, he became a specialist in the Jewish calendar, Jewish chronology, and the mathematical aspects of rabbinic literature. Known for his strict Orthodox observance and personal modesty, Zuckermann published several important works on the Jewish calendar and related subjects and contributed to the Monatsschrift für Geschichte und Wissenschaft des Judenthums.

== Life ==
Zuckermann was born in Breslau (Wrocław), in the Kingdom of Prussia's Province of Silesia, an Ashkenazic Jew. He received a thorough Hebrew and secular education at the institutions of his native city, and devoted himself at the university to the study of mathematics and astronomy. In 1845 he joined Heinrich Graetz in agitating for an address to Zecharias Frankel to congratulate him on the conservative stand which he had taken against the Frankfurt Conference; and when Frankel assumed the management of the Breslau seminary he appointed Zuckermann on the teaching staff. He gave instruction in mathematics to those of the students who had not had a regular school training, and taught calendric science in the academic department, at the same time acting as librarian and administrator of the stipendiary fund.

Zuckermann's religious attitude was strictly Orthodox. Twice a day he attended the synagogue maintained by him in the house which he had inherited from his father, although he lived in the seminary building, where daily services were held in the chapel. He never married; and while genial and kindly in nature, he was strongly opposed to anything savoring of ostentation. On his 70th birthday he fled from Breslau to escape all ovations, and in his will he forbade the delivering of a funeral address. He died in Breslau.

== Writings ==
- "Ueber Sabbatjahrcyclus und Jobelperiode", W. G. Korn, 1857;
- "Über Sabbathjahrcyclus und Jubelperiode," Breslau, 1859 (translated into English by A. Loewy, London, 1866);
- "Über Talmudische Münzen und Gewichte," Breslau, 1862;
- "Das jüdische Maasssystem und seine Beziehungen zum griechischen und römischen," Grass, Barth und Comp., 1867;
- "Katalog der Seminarbibliothek," part i., ib. 1870 (2d ed., ib. 1876);
- "Das Mathematische im Talmud," ib. 1878;
- "Materialien zur Entwickelung der altjüdischen Zeitrechnung im Talmud", Preuss und Jünger, 1882;
- "Die astronomischen Grundlagen der tabellarischen Beigabe zu den jüdischen Kalendern", 1890;
- "Tabelle zur Berechnung des Eintrittes der Nacht," ib. 1892;
- "Anleitung und Tabellen zur Vergleichung Jüdischer und Christlicher Zeitangaben," ib. 1893.
- He also contributed occasionally to the "Monatsschrift für Geschichte und Wissenschaft des Judenthums".
