= Paulus Stephanus Cassel =

German Jewish convert to Christianity, writer and missionary

Paulus Stephanus Cassel (February 27, 1821 – December 23, 1892), born Selig Cassel, was a German Jewish convert to Christianity, writer, orator, and missionary to Jews.

== Biography ==
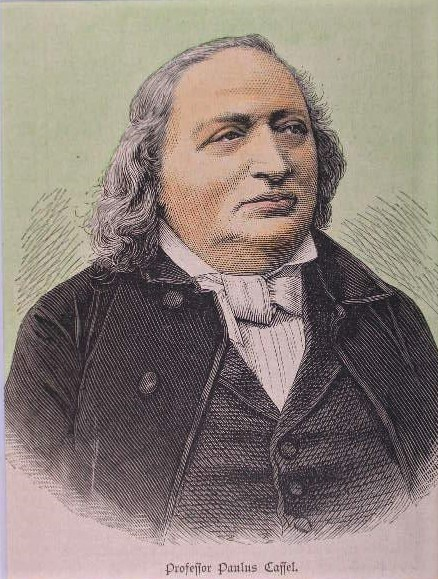
Paulus Stephanus Cassel, 1880

Cassel was born in Gross-Glogau, Silesia, Prussia. His father was a sculptor, and his brother David was a well-known rabbi in Berlin and docent at the Hochschule für die Wissenschaft des Judenthums (College for the Study of Judaism). Cassel studied at the Gymnasium of Glogau and Schweidnitz and at the University of Berlin, where he followed with special interest the lectures of the historian Leopold von Ranke. In 1849, he edited in Erfurt Constitutionelle Zeitung, and in 1850-56 Erfurter Zeitung, in a royalist spirit. He later received a doctor of divinity degree from Vienna.

According to his own statement, his Christian friends, and especially his study of the history of Israel, led him to Christianity. He was baptized as a member of Evangelical Church in Prussia on May 28, 1855 in the St. Peter's Church of Büßleben (now a locality of Erfurt), receiving the name "Paulus Stephanus." In later years, he celebrated May 28 as his "second birthday". He became librarian of the Royal Library in Erfurt and secretary of the Academy in Erfurt in the following year. He remained in Erfurt till 1859. King Frederick William IV bestowed the title of professor on Cassel in recognition of his loyal labors. In 1860, he removed to Berlin, where he was a teacher at a gymnasium for a short time, and occupied himself with literary work. He was briefly editor of the official Deutsche Reform. He delivered public lectures, which drew increasingly large audiences, both Jews and Gentiles. These lectures made him known throughout Berlin and the country.

In 1866-1867, Cassel was a Conservative member of the Prussian House of Representatives, the second chamber of the Prussian parliament. He became a prominent member of the Conservative Party of Prussia.

In 1867, Cassel was appointed missionary by the London Society for Promoting Christianity Amongst the Jews (a Jewish Christian missionary society now known as the Church's Ministry Among Jewish People or CMJ), a position which he retained till March 1891. At the same time (1867), Cassel was assigned to the pastorate of the Christuskirche in Berlin, with over a thousand sittings, erected from 1863 to 1864 by the Society on Königgrätzer Straße (renamed as Stresemannstraße, now in Kreuzberg's part of the Friedrichstadt quarter). He remained in service there for twenty-four years.

He traveled and lectured widely, as this excerpt from a published letter shows ("Thoughts on the Jewish Mission", 1887):

Invitations came to give lectures in places at a distance. A dear friend of mine shewed me in 1860 a map of Germany, on which he marked all the towns in which I have lectured. Since then I have delivered over a thousand original lectures in Berlin and elsewhere. God's hand has guided me everywhere. My journeys have extended from Amsterdam to Buda-Pesth. I always had an attentive audience, and the poorer people in both large and small towns heard the Word with gladness - nay, even with enthusiasm.

He baptized 262 Jews in Christuskirche, among them doctors, authors, merchants.

In a pamphlet published a short time before his death, he complained of the inconsiderate treatment he had received at the hands of his Christian friends (Erstes Sendschreiben an Freunde in Deutschland und England über die Christuskirche in Berlin und ihr Martyrium durch die London Society, 1891). Hermann Leberecht Strack states that it is not clear what induced Cassel to join the Christian Church, though he contends that Cassel's reasons were obviously not mercenary. (See Herzog-Hauck, Real-Encyc. iii. 744). Cassel combated anti-Semitism with considerable warmth (in Wider Heinrich von Treitschke: Für die Juden, 1880; Die Antisemiten und die evangelische Kirche: Sendschreiben an einen evangelischen Geistlichen, 1881; Ahasverus: Die Sage vom ewigen Juden; eine wissenschaftliche Abhandlung; mit einem kritischen Protest wider Ed. v. Hartmann und Adolf Stöcker, 1885; also Der Judengott und Richard Wagner: Eine Antwort an die Bayreuther Blätter; Zum 28. Mai 1881). He wrote and spoke against Adolf Stöcker and Richard Wagner and other expressions of Protestant anti-Semitism during a period of its resurgence.

In his Emancipation und Mission Cassel endeavored to show that the Jews would obtain permanent relief from persecution not by civil enfranchisement, but through evangelization. In later years, however, he frankly receded from this view. De le Roi, the historian of Christian propaganda among the Jews, says that Cassel was animated by "a very decided Jewish spirit." In 1860, Cassel published Die Geschichte des Jüdischen Volkes seit der Zerstörung Jerusalems (History of the Jewish people since the destruction of Jerusalem). He exerted himself in the interest of proselytism among Jews. He stated his views on missionary work among them in the pamphlet entitled Wie ich über Judenmission denke, 1886; see also Nathanael. Zeitschrift für die Arbeit der Evangelischen Kirche an Israel, edited by Strack, 1897. From 1875 to 1889, he edited the weekly Sunem, ein Berliner Wochenblatt für christliches Leben und Wissen (16 vols.). Hallelujah! Einhundertundachtundachtzig geistliche Lieder is a collection of hymns reprinted from this journal. In 1847 Cassel wrote an earnest though somewhat fantastic study of Hungarian archaeology, Magyarische Alterthümer, which long remained of value. Of especial interest is his translation (with notes) of the reply to Chisdai ben Isaac of Joseph, king of the Khazars (pp. 183 et seq.).

Cassel died at Friedenau near Berlin, his last words being, "Wo ist denn das Himmelreich?" (Where is it, the kingdom of heaven?) His grave is preserved in the Protestant Friedhof I der Jerusalems- und Neuen Kirchengemeinde (Cemetery No. I of the congregations of Jerusalem's Church and New Church) in Kreuzberg, south of Halle Gate. According to the Allgemeine Zeitung des Judenthums,

When the anti-Semites began to show themselves, Cassel remembered his origin, and opposed the leaders, Stöcker, Wagner, and others with great decision and manliness. It was this manly action that gives us some satisfaction for his desertion of the parental religion. We have to judge this apostasy very differently from that of many others in former and present times, as he did not forsake his old creed for any worldly reason, or to get honors and position, but rather because he followed a mystical line of thought. God alone can judge the veracity and purity of his life; we dare not. 'Peace be to his ashes!'

== History of the Jews ==
Cassel's only methodic work is his history of the Jews from the destruction of Jerusalem to 1847 (Geschichte der Juden seit der Eroberung und Zerstörung Jerusalems und seines Heiligthums durch die Römer bis zum Jahre 1847. Eine wissenschaftliche Skizze; "Juden [Geschichte]", in: Allgemeine Encyclopaedie der Wissenschaften und Künste). This scientific treatment of Jewish history he wrote before his conversion, and it is signed "Selig Cassel." Isaak Markus Jost, however, says of it: "It is one-sided and merely gives episodes out of the life of Jews in various countries. It is collated in a fragmentary manner, though rich in erudite notes" Sabbathliche Erinnerungen was also published before Cassel's conversion — the first part anonymously, the second (signed "S. C." in the preface) being put forth for the benefit of indigent veterans of 1813–1815 German Liberation Wars.

== Biblical studies ==
Cassel's Biblical studies are conservative; and it is surprising that he neglected to use the fund of rabbinical lore he undoubtedly possessed. In 1865 he wrote Das Buch der Richter und Ruth for Johann Peter Lange's Theologisch-Homiletisches Bibelwerk. A second edition was translated into English in 1872. In 1878, appeared Das Buch Esther: Ein Beitrag zur Geschichte des Morgenlandes; aus dem Hebräischen übersetzt, historisch und theologisch erläutert, section 1, with an appendix, a translation of the Second Targum. The original text of the Second Targum Cassel published in Aus Litteratur und Geschichte und Geschichte: Abhandlungen von D. Paulus Cassel, 1885: "Zweites Targum zum Buche Esther: Im vocalisirten Urtext mit sachlichen und sprachlichen Erläuterungen herausgegeben." An English translation by Aaron Bernstein was published in Edinburgh in 1888. This English edition also gives translations of several of Cassel's essays; viz., "Mithra" (pp. 345–361), "The Winged Bulls of Persepolis" (pp. 362–377), and "Zoroaster" (pp. 378–400). Most of Cassel's other literary work partakes of the character of controversy. His larger work on Weihnachten, Ursprünge, Bräuche, und Aberglauben: Ein Beitrag zur Geschichte der Christlichen Kirche und des deutschen Volkes (1861), is a medley of ingenious but unsystematized erudition, and is pervaded by a tone of pious emotionalism.

Altogether, Cassel's versatility has secured him merely the admiration of his contemporaries. He was incapable of acquiring a position of influence in the church of his adoption. His more general works are: Vom Wege nach Damaskus, Apologetische Abhandlungen, 1872; Aus guter Stunde, Betrachtungen und Erinnerungen, 1874; Für ernste Stunden, Betrachtungen und Erinnerungen, 2d ed., 1881; Aus Literatur und Symbolik: Abhandlungen, 1884; Aus Literatur und Geschichte, 1885; Vom Nil zum Ganges, Wanderungen in die Orientalische Welt, 1880; and Das Leben des Menschen in Geschichte und Symbol, 1893. Besides, Cassel wrote a large number of pamphlets on theological, ethnological, and philological subjects.

== Works ==
- Ahasverus: Die Sage vom ewigen Juden; eine wissenschaftliche Abhandlung; mit einem kritischen Protest wider Ed. v. Hartmann und Adolf Stöcker, Berlin: Internationale Buchhandlung, 1885
- Aus der Hagia Sophia: Ein Akademisches Neujahrs-Programm, Erfurt: Villaret, 1856
- Aus guter Stunde: Betrachtungen und Erinnerungen, Gotha: Schlößmann, 1874
- Aus Literatur und Geschichte, Berlin and Leipzig: W. Friedrich, 1885
- Aus Literatur und Symbolik: Abhandlungen, Leipzig: W. Friedrich, 1884
- Das Buch der Richter und Ruth, Bielefeld: Velhagen & Klasing, 1887
- Das Buch Esther: Ein Beitrag zur Geschichte des Morgenlandes; aus dem Hebräischen übersetzt, historisch und theologisch erläutert, Berlin: Rothberger & Co., 1878
- Das Leben des Menschen in Geschichte und Symbol (=Geschichte und Symbol; 1, only one volume published), Berlin: R. Boll, 1893
- Das tausend jährige Reich und die Satansbindung. Eine theologisch-historische Abhandlung, Berlin: Expedition des "Sunem", 1882
- Denkschrift der Königlichen Akademie gemeinnütziger Wissenschaften in Erfurt: Herausgegeben am Seculartage ihrer Gründung, den 19. Juli, 1854, Erfurt: Villaret, 1854
- Der Judengott und Richard Wagner: Eine Antwort an die Bayreuther Blätter; Zum 28. Mai 1881, Berlin: Wohlgemuth, 1881
- Der Mittler (Mesites): Ein exegetischer Versuch zu Galater 3,19.20, Erfurt: 1855
- Dialoge über Wissenschaft und Christenthum, Erfurt: 1856
- Die Antisemiten und die evangelische Kirche: Sendschreiben an einen evangelischen Geistlichen, 2d ed., Berlin: Wohlgemuth, 1881
- Die Geschichte des Jüdischen Volkes seit der Eroberung und Zerstörung Jerusalems und seines Heiligthums durch die Römer bis zum Jahre 1847. Eine wissenschaftliche Skizze, Gesellschaft zur Beförderung des Christenthums unter den Juden (ed.), Berlin: Magazin des Haupt-Vereins für christliche Erbauungsschriften in den Preußischen Staaten, 1860
- Eddische Studien, Weimar: H. Böhlau, 1856
- Emancipation und Mission: Vortrag in der Versammlung des kirchlichen Zentralvereins zu Gnadau am 2.10.1860, Quedlinburg: Franke, 1860
- Erstes Sendschreiben an Freunde in Deutschland und England über die Christuskirche in Berlin und ihr Martyrium durch die London Society, Berlin: Ginzel, 1891
- Für ernste Stunden: Betrachtungen und Erinnerungen, 2d ed., Berlin: Expedition des Sunem, 1881
- Hallelujah! Einhundertundachtundachtzig geistliche Lieder
- Irene, eine sprachlich-exegetische Skizze, Erfurt: Villaret, 1855
- Magyarische Alterthümer, Berlin: Veit & Co., 1848
- Rose und Nachtigall: Vortrag auf Veranlassüng des Berliner Hülfsvereins des Germanischen National-Museums in Nürnberg den 8. Februar 1860 gehalten, Berlin: Rauh, 1860
- Sabbathliche Erinnerungen
- Sunem, ein Berliner Wochenblatt für christliches Leben und Wissen: 16 vols. (a weekly edited by Cassel from 1875 to 1889)
- Ueber thüringische Ortsnamen, Erfurt: Villaret, 1856–1858, reprint: Cologne: Böhlau, 1983, (=Mitteldeutsche Forschungen. Sonderreihe Quellen und Darstellungen in Nachdrucken; vol. 5)
- Vom Nil zum Ganges: Wanderungen in die Orientalische Welt, Berlin: A. Hoffmann & Co., 1880
- Vom Wege nach Damaskus: Apologetische Abhandlungen, Gotha: Schlößmann, 1872
- Von Warschau bis Olmütz, Berlin: W. Adolf & Co., 1851
- Weihnachten, Ursprünge, Bräuche, und Aberglauben: Ein Beitrag zur Geschichte der Christlichen Kirche und des deutschen Volkes, Berlin: Rauh, 1861, reprint: Wiesbaden: VMA, 1980
- Wider Heinrich von Treitschke: Für die Juden, Berlin: Stahn, 1880
- Wie ich über Judenmission denke, Berlin: Expedition des "Sunem", 1886
- Wissenschaftliche Berichte: Unter Mitwirkung von Mitgliedern der Erfurter Akademie gemeinnütziger Wissenschaften, Erfurt: Keyser, 1853-1854.
- Zweites Targum zum Buche Esther: Im vocalisirten Urtext mit sachlichen und sprachlichen Erläuterungen, Berlin and Leipzig: W. Friedrich, 1885, (=Aus Litteratur und Geschichte und Geschichte: Abhandlungen von D. Paulus Cassel)

Essays with respect to Judaism, dating from this time, are the following

- "Das Glaubensbekenntniss der Zenobia, Fürstin von Palmyra", in: Literaturblatt des Orients, 1841, Nos. 31 et seq.
- "Der Apostat", in: Literaturblatt des Orients, 1843, Nos. 18 et seq.
- "Historische Versuche: Anmerkungen zu Benjamin von Tudela, Französische Städtenamen, Apologie," Berlin: Adolf, 1847
- "Juden [Geschichte]", in: Allgemeine Encyclopaedie der Wissenschaften und Künste: 167 vols., Johann Samuel Ersch and Johann Gottfried Gruber, ii., part 27, pp. 1–238
- Ueber die Rabbinerversammlung des Jahres 1650. Eine historische Abhandlung. Festschrift Sr. Ehrwürden Herrn J.[acob] J.[oseph] Oettinger (An attack on the veracity of S. Brett's narrative. With a translation of the text.), Berlin: Buchhandlung des Berliner Lesecabinets Berlin Trowitzsch, 1845

Other writings by Cassel with reference to Judaism and the Jews are the following

- "Caricaturnamen", in: Paulus Cassel, Aus Literatur und Geschichte, Berlin and Leipzig: W. Friedrich, 1885, pp. 323–347
- "Das Zicklein aus der Jüdischen Passahliturgie", in: Paulus Cassel, Aus dem Lande des Sonnenaufgangs, Berlin: Wilhelm Issleib (Gustav Schuhr), 1885, pp. 1–16
- "Der Ewige Jude," in: Geschichte und Symbol; vol. 1 (only one volume published), Berlin: R. Boll, 1893, pp. 367–410
- Die Symbolik des Blutes und «Der arme Heinrich» von Hartmann von der Aue, Berlin: A. Hoffmann & Co., 1882
- Mischle Sindbad, Secundus Syntipas, edirt, emendirt und erklärt: Einleitung und Deutung des Buches der Sieben weisen Meister, 3d ed., Berlin: Verlag des Bibliographischen Bureaus, 1891 (an important treatise on medieval folklore, and the contributions made thereto by Jews)
- "Shylock, der Kaufmann von Venedig", in Aus Literatur und Symbolik: Abhandlungen, Leipzig: W. Friedrich, 1884, pp. 368–386
- "Zur Naturgeschichte der Chuzpe: Sendschreiben an das Berliner Tagblatt", in: Paulus Cassel, Aus dem Lande des Sonnenaufgangs, Berlin: Wilhelm Issleib (Gustav Schuhr), 1885, pp. 89–100 (a reply to Fritz Mauthner's review of Ahasverus)

He wrote many poems and hymns and some plays, including Vom Könige, Das neue Schauspiel, Der Wiener Congress and Paulus in Damascus.
