= Colmberg =

- Municipality
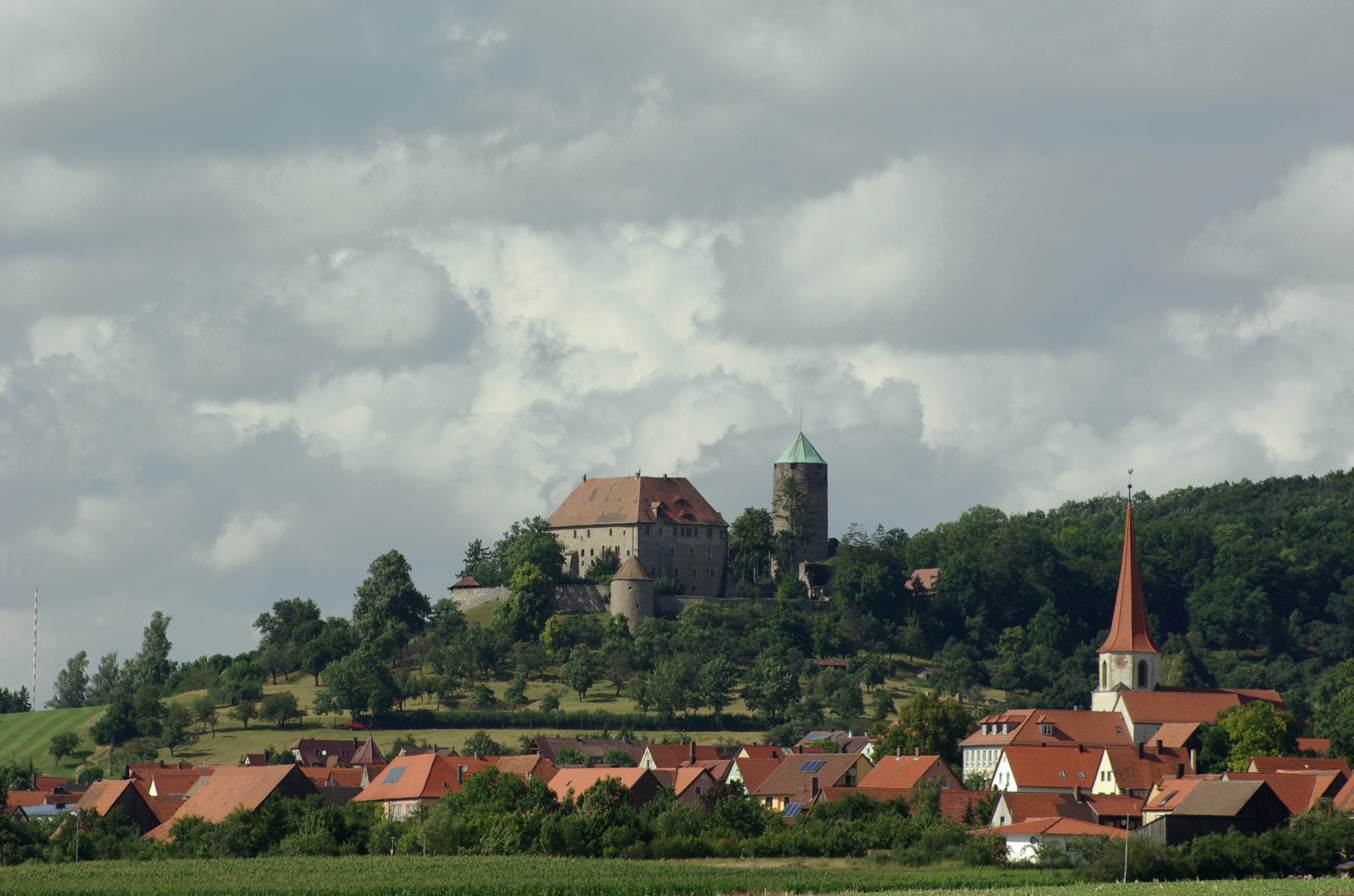
- View of Colmberg with Colmberg Castle and Church of Saint Ursula

- Coat of arms

- Location of Colmberg within Ansbach district
- Interactive map of Colmberg
- Location within Germany Location within Bavaria
- Coordinates: 49°22′N 10°25′E
- Country: Germany
- State: Bavaria
- Admin. region: Mittelfranken
- District: Ansbach
- Subdivisions: 12 Ortsteile

Government
  - Mayor (2020–26): Wilhelm Kieslinger (CSU)

Area
  - Total: 38.34 km^{2} (14.80 sq mi)
- Elevation: 450 m (1,480 ft)

Population (2025-12-31)
  - Total: 2,142
  - Density: 55.87/km^{2} (144.7/sq mi)
- Time zone: UTC+01:00 (CET)
  - Summer (DST): UTC+02:00 (CEST)
- Postal codes: 91598
- Dialling codes: 09803
- Vehicle registration: AN
- Website: www.colmberg.de

Colmberg (German pronunciation: [ˈkɔlmbɛʁk]) is a municipality in the district of Ansbach in Bavaria in Germany. Colmberg is the site of Colmberg Castle (German: Burg Colmberg), built in the 13th century and purchased in 1318 by Duke Frederick IV of Nuremberg. The town is located in Nature Park Frankenhöhe.

== Notable residents ==
- Karl Amson Joel, a textile merchant and grandfather of American musician Billy Joel

== Twin towns ==
- (Germany) Wartenburg, Saxony-Anhalt

== Gallery ==
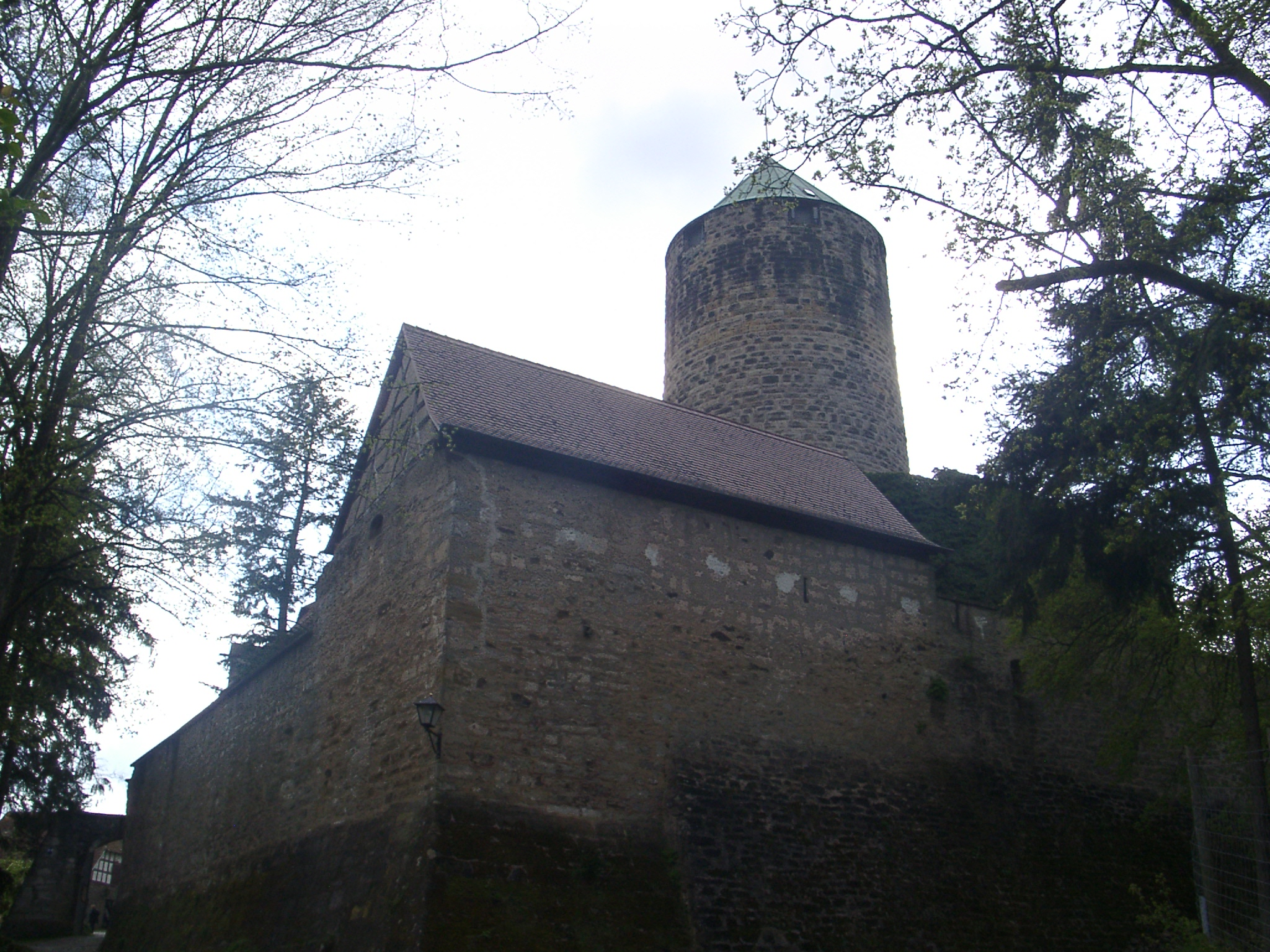
Colmberg Castle

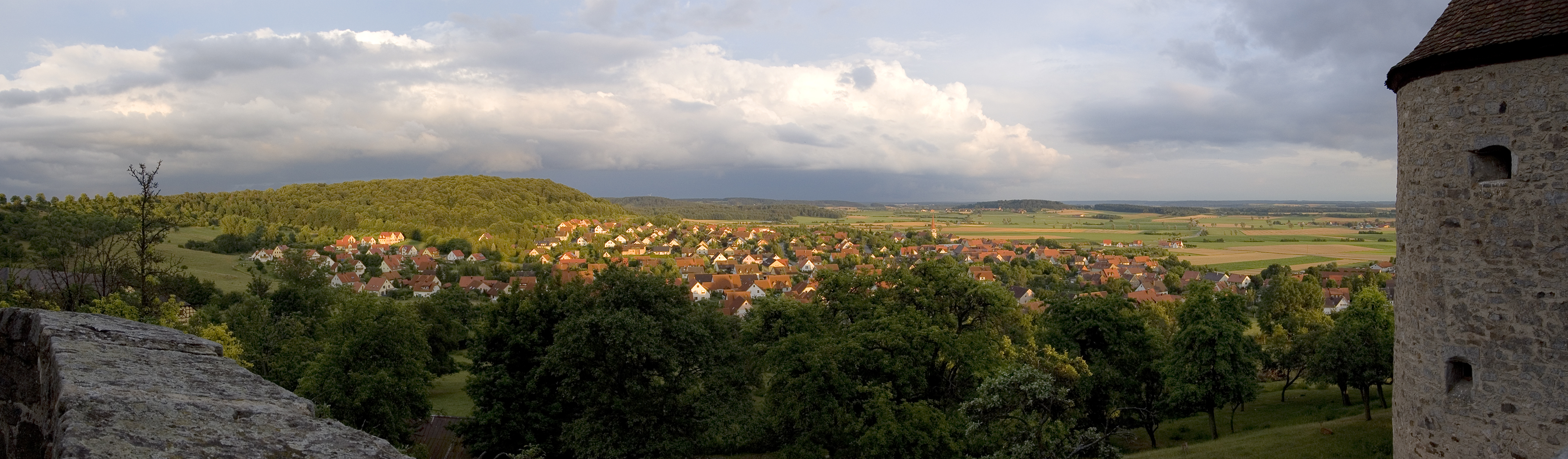
A view of the town from the castle

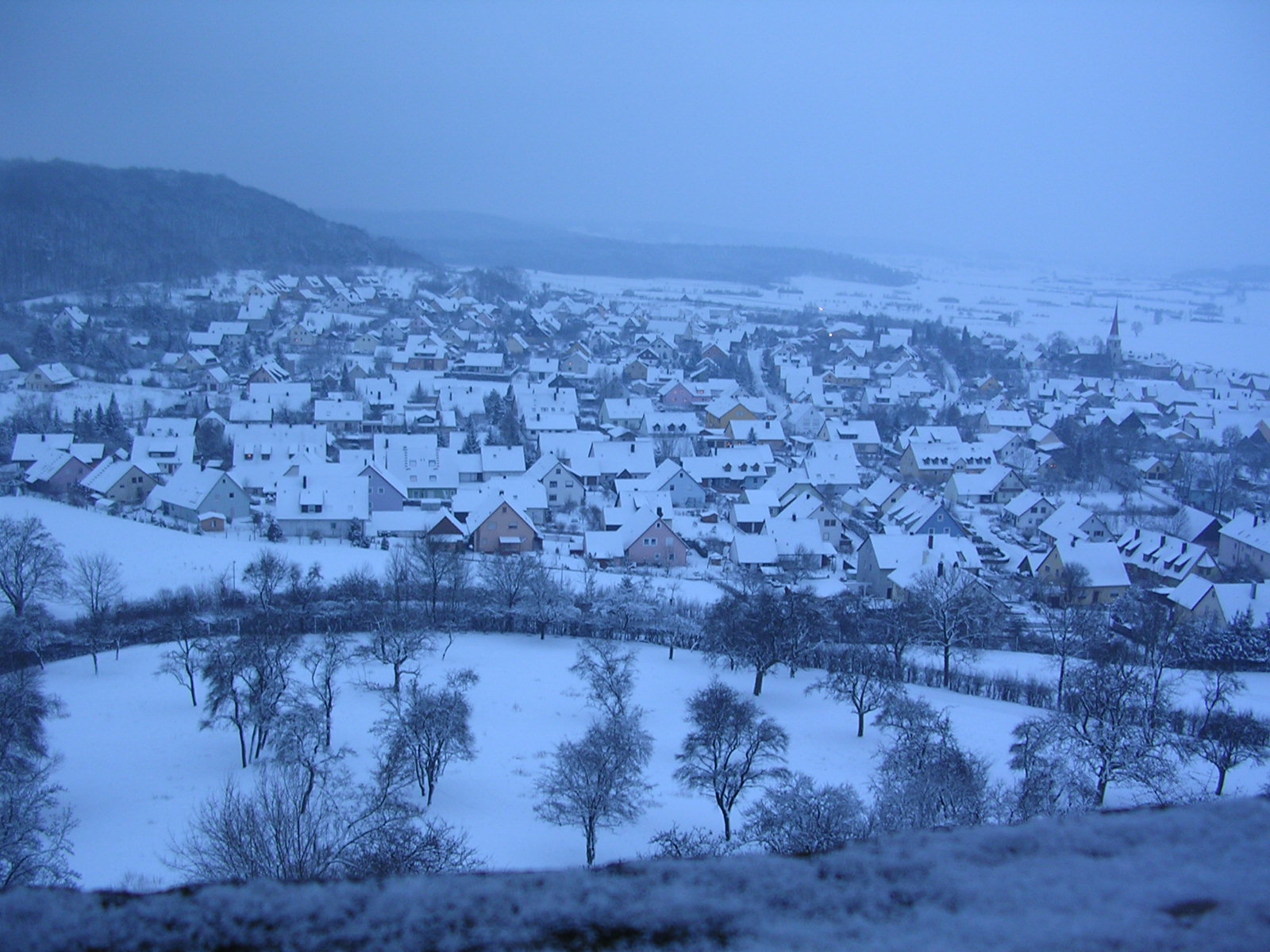
A view of the town from the castle in winter

== See also ==
- Franconia
- List of castles in Bavaria
- Romantic Road
