= Jewish Theological Seminary of Breslau =

Former religious school in Breslau, Silesia

- Jüdisch-Theologisches Seminar (Fraenckel'sche Stiftung)
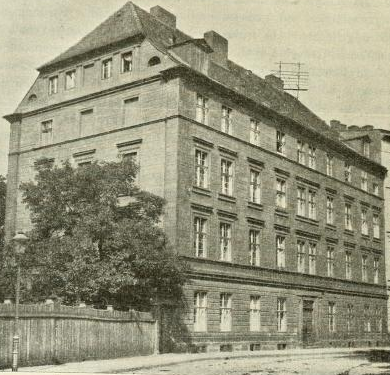
- Jewish Theological Seminary of Breslau in 1904

Location
- 14–18 Wlodkowica Street; Breslau (now Wrocław); Germany

Information
- Type: Rabbinical seminary
- Religious affiliation: Judaism
- Denomination: Positive-historical Judaism
- Established: August 10, 1854
- Founder: Jonas Fränckel
- Closed: 1938
- Language: German, Hebrew
- Affiliation: Wissenschaft des Judentums

The Jewish Theological Seminary of Breslau (German: Jüdisch-Theologisches Seminar Fraenckel'sche Stiftung) was an institution in Breslau for the training of rabbis, founded under the will of Jonah Fränckel, and opened in 1854. It was the first modern rabbinical seminary in Central Europe, an academic precursor to today’s Conservative movement, and a center of Wissenschaft des Judentums. The seminary, at what is now an empty building plot (used as a car park) on 14-18 Wlodkowica Street, was closed in 1938 by Nazi Party officials following Kristallnacht.

Commercial Councilor ("Kommerzienrath") Jonas Fränckel, a descendant of a rabbinic family, and a very wealthy bachelor, who devoted his entire fortune to philanthropic and educational purposes, left a bequest for the establishment of a training-school for rabbis and Jewish teachers. Fränckel was president of the Breslau congregation, and an enthusiastic supporter of Abraham Geiger, who had no doubt inspired the bequest; and it was probably the founder's intention that Geiger should be the president of the institution (Abraham Geiger, "Leben in Briefen", p. 129, Berlin, 1878). The executors of the Fränckel legacy felt, however, that an institution which should be presided over by a man of Geiger's extreme views would not gain the confidence of the congregations; they therefore called Zecharias Frankel to the presidency (February 7, 1853).

Owing to some legal complications, the seminary could not be opened until August 10, 1854, although its constitution had been confirmed by royal order of August 31, 1847. Frankel selected as teachers Heinrich Graetz and Jacob Bernays, to whom Manuel Joël and Benedict Zuckermann were added as assistants, both being soon afterward promoted to the rank of regular teachers.

== Original departments ==
The institution had at the beginning three divisions, namely: the regular rabbinical department, which admitted only such students as were entitled to enter the university; the preparatory department, receiving students who possessed the knowledge required for entrance to the "Secunda" of a Prussian gymnasium; and a training-school for religious teachers. For a teacher's diploma a three-year course of study was required, while the rabbinical course required seven years. The teachers' seminary, which in the beginning was very well attended, soon declined, and in 1867 was closed on account of lack of students. The preparatory department, originally necessary because the students of the seminary came largely from yeshivot and had no secular training, became superfluous with the increase of students having regular gymnasium education, and was closed in 1887; from then on the seminary had only one department, and provided for theological training only.

The administrators of the Fränckel estate inaugurated the seminary with a capital of 100,000 thalers ($72,000) apart from the building and the library; for a teachers' pension fund the sum of 3,000 thalers was set aside; and a stipendiary fund for students was started with 5,000 thalers. The last-named fund received many additions in later years, and special foundations were created for graduates who had not obtained positions, e.g., the Director Frankel Stiftung, founded on the occasion of Zecharias Frankel's seventieth birthday (1861), and a similar foundation on the occasion of Graetz's seventieth birthday (1887); two prizes, one founded by Joseph Lehmann (1855) with a capital of 1,800 marks, and one by David Kaufmann (1895), in memory of David Rosin, with a capital of 4,000 kronen.

== Curriculum and staff ==
The subjects taught at the rabbinical seminary were: Talmudic literature, by the president ("Director"); history and exegesis, by Heinrich Graetz; philosophy of religion, by Jakob Bernays; homiletics and Midrash, by Manuel Joël; and the calendar by Zuckermann, who was also librarian. This division was changed in details when the teaching staff underwent changes but remained the same in its general principles. In 1863 Joël became rabbi of Breslau and was succeeded by Jacob Freudenthal, who retained his position at the seminary until 1888, when he was appointed professor of philosophy at Breslau University. In 1866 Bernays was called as professor of philosophy and chief librarian to the University of Bonn, and he was succeeded at the seminary by David Rosin, who held the post until his death (December 31, 1894). After Zecharias Frankel's death (February 13, 1875), Leyser Lazarus was elected president and served as such from September 23, 1875, until his death (April 16, 1879).

After Lazarus' death the administration changed. David Joël, brother of Manuel Joël, was called to the institution as professor of the Talmudic branches, with the title of "Seminarrabbiner", and the presidency was to alternate between him and Professor Graetz as the senior of the faculty. Joël, who entered upon the duties of his office January 1, 1880, died September 9, 1882; and since his death the presidency of the seminary was held in turn by the members of the faculty. Joël was succeeded as "Seminarrabbiner" by Israel Lewy, who took the chair of Talmudic literature on May 1, 1883. After the death of Graetz (September 7, 1891) Marcus Brann occupied the chair of history, teaching at the same time exegesis and Talmudic codes. After the death of Zuckermann (December 17, 1891) his position as teacher was not filled, Brann assuming the duties of librarian. Upon Rosin's death (December 31, 1894), Saul Horovitz was called (January 1896). He taught philosophy of religion, homiletics, and some of the Talmudic branches; so that by 1904 the professorial staff comprised only three teachers (Lewy, Brann, and Horovitz).

== Students ==
The institution remained faithful to the spirit of its first president, Zecharias Frankel, the principal exponent of "positive-historical Judaism". It proclaimed freedom in theoretical research, but demanded of its disciples a faithful adherence to the practices of traditional Judaism. It claimed to be the earliest seminary of the modern type, as the Séminaire Rabbinique of Paris was hardly more than a yeshiva before its removal from Metz. At all events the Jüdisch-Theologisches Seminar was the first scientific institution for the training of German rabbis; and as such it was the type for those since founded, like Rabbinical Seminary of Budapest and a seminary in Vienna.

== Later history ==
The school was destroyed by the Nazis in 1938.

== Alumni ==
- Rabbi Emanuel Gerechter (1842–1926), German-American rabbi
- Rabbi Leopold Treitel (1845–1931), scholar and last rabbi of the Jewish community in Laupheim.
- Rabbi Henry J. Messing (1847–1913), German-American rabbi
- Rabbi Leo Baeck (1873–1956), German rabbi, scholar, and theologian
- Rabbi Ismar Elbogen (1874–1943), German rabbi, scholar and historian
- Rabbi Dr. Adolf Kober, head rabbi of Cologne, Germany from 1918 to 1939. Kober later moved to New York and was a rabbi there as well.
- Rabbi Arthur Löwenstamm (1882–1965), rabbi of Spandau Synagogue from 1917 to 1938
- Rabbi Michaelis Machol (1845–1912), German-American rabbi
- Rabbi Dr. Samuel Wolfenstein, who became rabbi in St. Louis, Missouri and later was instrumental in the Jewish Orphanage in Cleveland, Ohio, United States.

== Bibliography ==
- Annual reports of the institution, each of which contains a scientific essay; and the periodicals, chiefly the Monatsschrift, from 1853
- Brann, Marcus. Geschichte des Jüdisch-Theologischen Seminars (Fraenckel'sche Stiftung) in Breslau. Festschrift zum fünfzigjährigen Jubiläum der Anstalt. Breslau, 1904. Digitized copy at archive.org
- Das jüdisch-theologische Seminar (Fränckelsche Stiftung) zu Breslau, am Tage seines fünfundzwanzigjährigen Bestehens, den 10. August 1879. Breslau, [1879]
- Zur Geschichte des Jüdisch-Theologischen Seminars, in Programm zur Eröffnung des Jüdisch-Theologischen Seminars. Breslau, 1854. Digitized copy at archive.org
- Miron, Guy. "The Breslau Rabbinical Seminary: The last Generation", in: From Breslau to Jerusalem, Rabbinical Seminaries: Research and Reflections, The Schechter Institute of Jewish Studies & Leo Baeck Institute, Jerusalem, 2009, pp. 86–99
- Fuchs, Jenka. From the Critical Study of Jewish History and Culture to ‘Enemy Research’ and Provenance Research. The Library of the Breslau Rabbinical Seminary, in: Collecting Educational Media: Making, Storing and Accessing Knowledge, edited by Anke Hertling and Peter Carrier, Berghahn Books, New York, Oxford, 2022, pp. 153–173 (doi.org/10.1515/9781800734845-011)

== See also ==
- Hochschule für die Wissenschaft des Judentums
- Jewish Theological Seminary of America
- Leo Baeck College
- Rabbinical Seminary of Budapest
- Jewish Theological Seminary of Vienna
