= Israel Lewy =

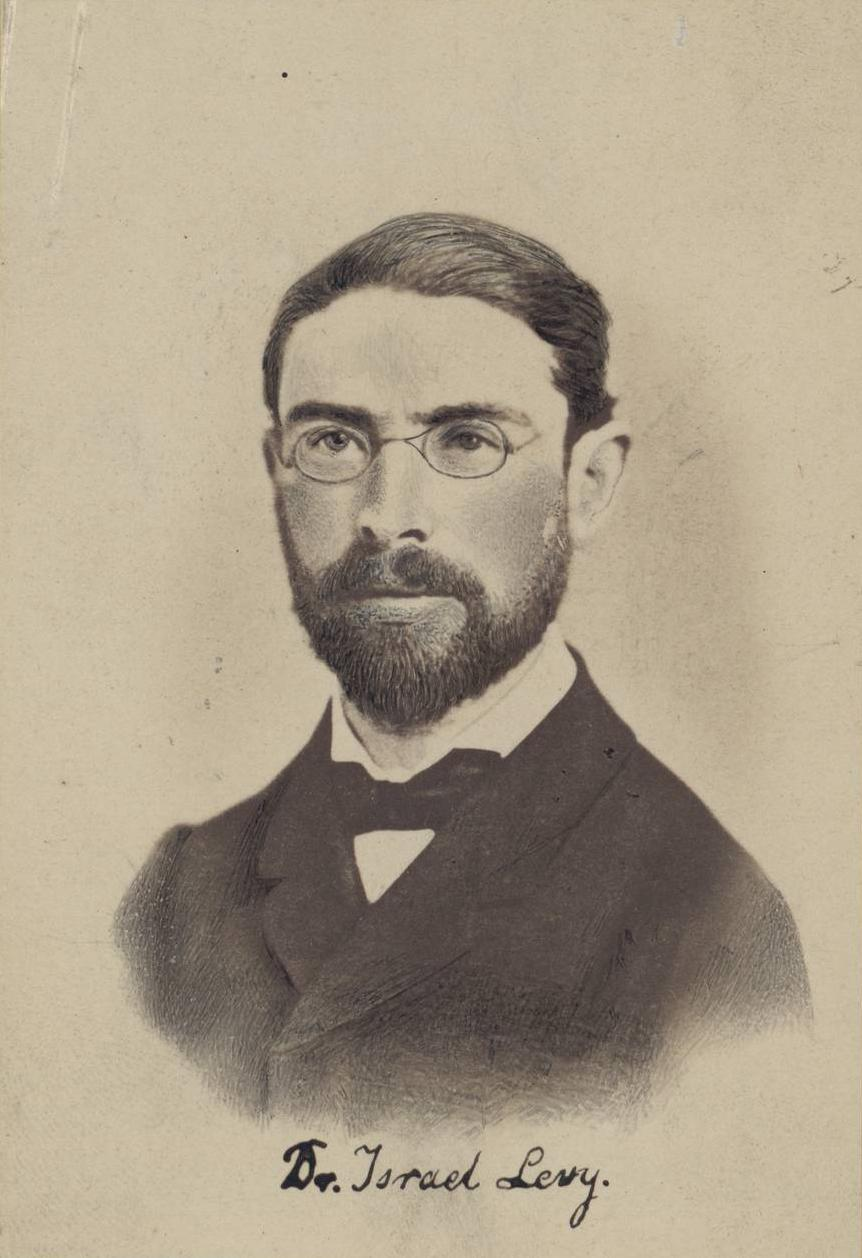
Rabbi Dr. Israel Lewy

Israel Lewy (7 January 1841 – 8 September 1917) was a German-Jewish scholar.

== Biography ==
He was educated at the Jewish Theological Seminary and the University in Breslau. In 1874 he was appointed docent at the Lehranstalt für die Wissenschaft des Judenthums in Berlin, and in 1883, on the death of David Joël, he was called to the seminary at Breslau. Lewy's knowledge of Talmudic literature was unusually wide; he was endowed also with an exceptionally acute and dispassionate critical spirit and with a faculty for grasping the proper importance of details.

His first publication was Ueber einige Fragmente aus der Mischna des Abba Saul (Berlin, 1876), in which he showed that the Mishnah collections of the foremost teachers in the period before the final redaction of the Mishnah itself, including that of Abba Saul, agreed as regards all the essential points of the Halakha.

Ein Wort über die Mechilta des R. Simon (Breslau, 1889) was likewise an authoritative work in the field of halakhic exegesis. Lewy also published Interpretation des ersten, zweiten und dritten Abschnitts des Palästinischen Talmud-Traktates Nesikin (ib. 1895–1902), and Ein Vortrag über das Ritual des Pesach-Abends (ib. 1904).

His work and publications later became fundamental cornerstones for the Talmudic studies at the Hebrew University of Jerusalem and from there to all modern day Talmudic studies, being the first to methodically and meticulously gather sources and versions of the words of Jewish sages leading to their origins. He hypothesised that the original name of the unified tractate of the Mishna and Tosefta dealing with monetary issues now called by its three parts (Bava Kama, Bava Metzia and Bava Bathra meaning first second and third gate) was not called Nezikin (damages) but rather Dinei Mamonot (civil law) a more fitting name. In fact, it would probably be a more fitting name for the order (Seder, one of six sections of the Mishna and Tosefta) itself which is called Nezikin although besides damages it includes court laws, punitive laws, and moral laws. But his main proof was shown to be stemmed from a mistake and most sources point to the fact that both the order and the tractate where referred to as Nezikin.
