= Salomon Munk =

German-born Jewish-French Orientalist (1803–1867)

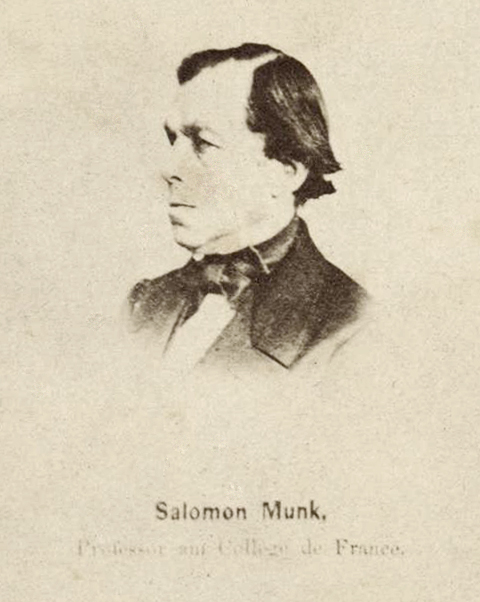
Salomon Munk

Salomon Munk (14 May 1803 – 5 February 1867) was a German-born Jewish-French Orientalist.

== Biography ==
Munk was born in Gross-Glogau in the Kingdom of Prussia. He received his first instruction in Hebrew from his father, an official of the Jewish community; and on the latter's death he joined the Talmud class of R. Jacob Joseph Oettinger. At the age of fourteen he was able to officiate as "ba'al ḳoreh" (reader of the Torah) in the synagogue of the Malbish 'Arummim society at Gross-Glogau.

In 1820 he went to Berlin, where he came into friendly relations with Leopold Zunz and with the philologist A. W. Zumpt, studying Latin and Greek with E. Gans. Two years later he entered the Joachimsthaler Gymnasium, supporting himself at the same time by tutoring. In 1824 he entered the University of Berlin, attending the lectures of Böckh, Hegel, and especially of Bopp.

As no Jews were at that time eligible for government positions in Prussia, Munk left the university without taking a degree, deciding to go to France. However, he first spent one term at the University of Bonn, studying Arabic with Freytag and Sanskrit with Lassen. On passing through Weimar he visited Goethe, who notes that fact in his journal.

In 1828 he went to Paris with the assistance of the young poet Michael Beer, the brother of Meyerbeer. Here also, as in Berlin, he at first supported himself by tutoring, among his pupils being the young brothers Alphonse and Gustave de Rothschild. In 1838 he was appointed cataloguer of Hebrew, Chaldaic, Syriac, and Arabic manuscripts in the Bibliothèque Nationale de Paris.

Munk now devoted himself to the study of the Judæo-Arabic literature of the Middle Ages and to the works of Maimonides, more especially the latter's Moreh Nebukim. He went direct to the Arabic original, supplementing the texts he found at the Bibliothèque from texts he had copied at Oxford. At the same time he made a thorough study of Aristotle, who is constantly quoted by Maimonides. In this way he gathered the necessary material for his edition of the Arabic text of the Moreh, with translation and annotations, which he published in three large volumes, long after he had become blind (1856, 1861, 1866). He had lost his eyesight in 1850 while in the course of cataloguing the Sanskrit and Hebrew manuscripts in the possession of the library.

== Journey to Egypt ==
Munk accompanied Montefiore and Crémieux to Egypt in connection with the Damascus affair; and it was due to his knowledge of Arabic (although some claim that the credit is due to Louis Loewe) that the word "justice" was substituted for "mercy" in the firman of Mohammed Ali which exculpated the accused from the charge of ritual murder. It was also largely due to his efforts that schools modeled on European methods of instruction were established by the Egyptian Jews.

At Cairo he purchased a considerable number of Arabic and Hebrew manuscripts on behalf of the Bibliothèque Nationale. On his return Munk was elected secretary of the Consistoire Central des Israélites de France; on December 3, 1858, he was elected a member of the Académie des Inscriptions et Belles-Lettres; and a few years later he was appointed professor of Hebrew at the Collège de France, in succession to Renan. He died in Paris.

== Works ==
Munk's works include the following:

- Le Guide des égarés (his edition of the Moreh)
  - Volume 1 (1856)
  - Volume 2 (1861)
  - Volume 3 (1866)
- "Reflexions sur le Culte des Anciens Hébreux," in vol. iv. of the Bible of S. Cahen
- "Notice sur R. Saadia Gaon et sur une Version Persane d'Isaie" (ib. vol. ix)
- "Palestine, Description Géographique, Historique et Archéologique," in "L'Univers Pittoresque," 1845 (translated into German by M. A. Levy, 1871–72) (Volume 4 of "L'Univers pittoresque ou histoire et description de tous les peuples, de leurs religions, moeurs, coutumes, industries: Asie")
- "Mélanges de Philosophie Juive et Arabe," 1859
- "Notice sur Abul Walid Merwan ibn Djanah et d'Autres Grammairiens Hébreux du X. et du XI. Siècle," 1850-51 (crowned by the Institut with the "Prix Volney")
- "Rapport sur les Progrès des Etudes Sémitiques en France de 1840-1866," in the "Recueil de Rapports" of the Exposition of 1867.

Between 1834 and 1838 he contributed to the Temps articles on Biblical, Hebrew, and Sanskrit literature. Mention must also be made of his interpretations of Phoenician inscriptions at Marseilles and on the sarcophagus of Eshmun'azar, King of Sidon, which he deciphered after losing his sight; of his discovery of the Arabic manuscript of Al-Biruni's description of India, written in the first part of the eleventh century; and of his letter to F. Arago, of the Academy of Sciences, relating to a question on the history of astronomy, which gave rise to a controversy between Biot and Sédillot.
