= David Rosin =

German Jewish theologian (1823-1894)

David Rosin (May 27, 1823 – December 31, 1894) was a German Jewish theologian from Rosenberg, Silesia.

Having received his early instruction from his father, who was a teacher in his native town, he attended the yeshiva of Kempen, of Myslowitz (under David Deutsch), and of Prague (under Rapoport); but, wishing to receive a regular school education, he went to Breslau, where he entered the gymnasium, and graduated in 1846. He continued his studies at the universities of Berlin and Halle (Ph.D. 1851) and passed his examination as teacher for the gymnasium. Returning to Berlin, he taught in various private schools until Michael Sachs, with whom he was always on terms of intimate friendship, appointed him principal of the religious school which had been opened in that city in 1854. At the same time Rosin gave religious instruction to the students of the Jewish normal school. In 1866 he was appointed Manuel Joël's successor as professor of homiletics, exegetical literature, and Midrash at the rabbinical seminary in Breslau, which position he held till his death.

== Literary works ==
Rosin was the author of:

- "Abschiedswort: Berichte über die Jüdische Religionsschule," Berlin, 1866;
- "Ein Compendium der Jüdischen Gesetzeskunde aus dem 14. Jahrhundert," Breslau, 1871 (on the "Sefer ha-Ḥinnuk");
- "Ethik des Maimonides," ib. 1876;
- "Rabbi Samuel ben Meir als Schrifterklärer," ib. 1880;
- "Reime und Gedichte des Abraham ibn Esra," in 5 parts, ib. 1885-94 (Ibn Ezra's poems with vocalized text and German transl. in rime).

Rosin is most famous for his comprehensive publication of Rashbam's (Rabbi Samuel ben Meir, the grandson of Rashi) commentary on the Pentateuch. He was responsible for making this unique commentary available to the public. He thoroughly analyzed this commentary, citing available manuscripts. Rashbam's commentary is famous for its plain meaning explanations of the Chumash (Pentateuch). This plain meaning explanation of the Chumash is termed peshat in Hebrew. Without Rosin's work, Rashbam's commentary may likely never have been known or published, as all manuscripts of his work were later destroyed during wartime.

He edited Michael Sachs' sermons (2 vols., Berlin, 1867), and he published Rabbi Samuel ben Meïr's commentary on the Pentateuch, with a Hebrew introduction and Hebrew language analysis, Breslau, 1881. He also published his Rashbam analysis in the German language. An essay of Rosin's on the philosophy of Abraham ibn Ezra was edited after his death by his devoted pupil David Kaufmann and published in the "Monatsschrift" (vols. xlii.-xliii.), to which magazine Rosin occasionally contributed.

Rosin did his literary work with an exemplary accuracy of detail and in perfect sympathy with his subject. To his numerous disciples he was a kind friend and adviser. In his religious attitude he was strictly conservative, a true disciple of Michael Sachs (whose admirer he was); and he was at the same time broad-minded and tolerant of the opinions of others. His only son, Heinrich Rosin, was a professor of medicine at the University of Berlin. Another relative, a nephew, Heinrich Rosin, was a professor in the law department of the University of Freiburg.
