= Joachim Jacob Unger =

Austrian rabbi (1826–1912)

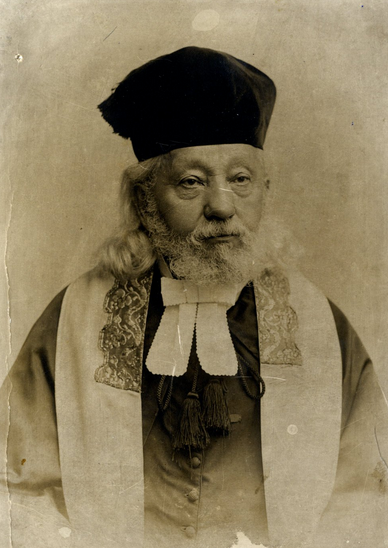
- Born: 25 November 1826; Humenné, Zemplén County, Hungary
- Died: 16 October 1912 (aged 85)

Joachim Jacob Unger (born 25 November 1826 in Humenné, Zemplén County, Hungary – 16 October 1912) was an Austrian rabbi.

== Biography ==
He studied at the University of Berlin (Ph.D. 1859), and was appointed rabbi of Jihlava, Moravia, in 1860. He wrote several works, including:

- Hebräische Philologie und Biblische Exegese, in Mannheimer-Album, Vienna, 1864
- Bemerkungen über die Phönicischen Opfertafeln von Marseille und Carthago, in Zeitschrift der Deutschen Morgenländischen Gesellschaft, xxiv.
- Die Judenfrage in Preussen, in Neuzeit, 1874
- Patriotische Casual-Reden, Iglau, 1881 (2d ed. Prague, 1899)
- Dichtungen, ib. 1885
- Fest- und Sabbath-Predigten, Prague and Breslau, 1903

== Bibliography ==
- - Lippe, Biog. Lex. pp. 505–507, Vienna, 1881;
  - Zeitlin, Bibl. Post-Mendels., p. 401.
