= David Joël =

Rabbi David Joël

Personal life
- Born: David Heymann Joël; 12 January 1815 Inowrazław, Kingdom of Prussia
- Died: 7 September 1882 (aged 67) Breslau, German Empire
- Education: University of Berlin
- Occupation: Rabbi, author

Religious life
- Religion: Judaism
- Main work: Midrash ha-Zohar (1849)

David Heymann Joël (Hebrew: דוד בן חיים יואל; 12 January 1815 – 7 September 1882) was a German rabbi and scholar of Jewish philosophy and mysticism.

== Biography ==
David Joël was born in 1815 to Liebchen (née Freudenheim) and Rabbi Heimann Joël in Inowrazław, Province of Posen (then part of the Kingdom of Prussia). Joël received a Talmudic education from his father, who became chief rabbi of Schwerin an der Warthe in 1832, and from Rabbi Akiva Eger in Posen.

In 1836, he moved to Berlin to continue his education. There, he studied Talmud under Rabbis Oettinger and Landsberg, while simultaneously attending lectures in secular subjects at the University of Berlin. Among his university instructors were the historian Friedrich von Raumer, the natural philosopher Henrik Steffens, and the historian August Neander.

Joël was ordained as a rabbi in 1842 and, in 1843, accepted a rabbinical position in Schwersenz. During his tenure there, he authored Midrash ha-Zohar, or Die Religionsphilosophie des Sohar und ihr Verhältniss zur Allgemeinen Theologie ('The Religious Philosophy of the Zohar and Its Relation to General Theology'), a pioneering scholarly analysis of Kabbalah published in Leipzig in 1849. The work is an examination of the philosophy of the Zohar and a criticism of the work of Adolphe Franck. Joël received a Ph.D. a year after the book's publication.

From 1859 to 1879, Joël served as rabbi in Krotoschin. In 1879, he was appointed to the faculty of the Jewish Theological Seminary of Breslau, where he began teaching Talmud and rabbinic literature in early 1880.

While at the seminary in Breslau, Joël authored Der Aberglaube und die Stellung des Judenthums zu demselben ('Superstition and the Attitude of Judaism Toward It'). Only two parts of the work were published: the first part was included in the Seminary's 1881 annual report, and the second part appeared posthumously in the 1883 report, edited and published by his brother Manuel Joël.

He died in Breslau in 1882.
