= Ludwig Lichtschein =

Hungarian rabbi (died 1886)

Ludwig Lajos Lichtschein
- Title: Rabbi

Personal life
- Born: 1820 Komorn
- Died: 1886 (aged 65–66) Ofen
- Occupation: Writer

Religious life
- Religion: Judaism

Ludwig Lajos Lichtschein (1820 – 1886) was a Hungarian rabbi.

== Biography ==
Lichtschein was born in Komorn in 1820. He studied at Pápa, gained a doctorate of philosophy, and was rabbinical assessor of Austerlitz, Nagykanizsa, and Esztergom. He became a student of rabbi Lazar Horowitz.

Lichtschein worked as an assistant rabbi 1865 to 1868. In 1866, while serving in Nagykanizsa, he would notably advocate for the need to encourage patriotism among the Jewish youth. He would go on to become one of the most prominent rabbis in Austerlitz.

From 1876 until his death, Lichtschein was rabbi at Somogy-Csurgó while writing more works.

Lichtschein died in 1886 in Ofen.

== Published Works ==
Lichtschein was the author of the following works:

- A Zsidók Kőzép és Jelenkori Helyzetők (Gross Kanizsa, 1866), on the condition of the Jews in medieval and modern times
- Die Dreizehn Glaubensartikel (Brünn, 1870), a sermon
- Der Targum zu den Propheten (in Stern's Ha-Meḥaḳḳer, i)
- Der Talmud und der Socialismus (ib. iii); Kossuth Lajos és a Sátoraljaúhelyi Rabbi (in Magyar Zsidó Szémle, 1885), on Kossuth and the rabbi of Sátoralja-Ujhely.
