= Alexander Joel (conductor) =

British-German pianist and conductor (born 1971)

- Born: Charles Alexander Joel; 1971 (age 54–55); London, England
- Occupations: Pianist; conductor
- Relatives: Billy Joel (half-brother); Karl Amson Joel (grandfather)
- Website: www.alexanderjoel.com

Charles Alexander Joel (born 1971) is a British-German pianist and conductor.

== Career ==
Born in London, Joel began his conducting career in Nuremberg, followed by positions at Baden bei Wien, Klagenfurt and the Vienna Volksoper. From 2001 to 2007 he held the position of Erster Kapellmeister at the Deutsche Oper am Rhein in Düsseldorf and Duisburg.

He has served as guest conductor for numerous orchestras in Europe and elsewhere, including the Bavarian State Opera, the Sächsische Staatskapelle Dresden, the MDR Symphony Orchestra, the Deutsches Symphonie-Orchester Berlin and the Hamburg State Opera. Outside Germany, Joel has conducted at the Teatro Regio in Parma, the Finnish National Opera, Welsh National Opera, Municipal Theater of Santiago, Chile, and the Théâtre des Champs-Élysées in Paris, among others.

From the 2007–2008 to the 2013–2014 season Alexander Joel was the Generalmusikdirektor (GMD) of Staatstheater Braunschweig and principal conductor of Staatsorchester Braunschweig, succeeding Jonas Alber, who had led the orchestra since 1997.

== Personal life ==
Joel was born in London in 1971. He is a grandson of Karl Amson Joel. His parents were Audrey and Howard Joel.

His father, Howard, born Helmut Joel in Nuremberg, had immigrated with his own parents to the United States as refugees from the Nazi persecution of Jews. Howard worked as an engineer in New York, where he married his first wife, Rosalind. They had two children, Judith “Judy” Joel (adopted via Rosalind’s sister) and Billy Joel, the American singer/songwriter, who is one of the world's best-selling music artists. After their divorce, in 1957, Howard returned to Europe, where he married Alexander's mother, Audrey.

On April 28, 2014, Alexander married soprano Hayoung Lee.

== Sources ==
- Berns, Hajo, "Mozarts Schwanengesang", Westdeutsche Allgemeine Zeitung, 17 April 2009, Accessed 27 October 2009 (in German).
- Deutsche Oper am Rhein, Alexander Joel. Accessed 27 October 2009 (in German).
- Likus, Harald, "Ein Joel klingt nicht wie der andere", Braunschweiger Zeitung, 22 December 2005. Accessed 27 October 2009 (in German).
- Lipson, Karen (19 January 2003). "A tale of two Nazi-era families". Newsday. Bergen County, NJ. Archived from the original on 2 November 2012 – via HighBeam Research.
- Paxmann, Jürgen, "Neuer Dirigent gastiert in Helmstedt", Braunschweiger Zeitung, 26 April 2008. Accessed 27 October 2009 (in German).
- Staatstheater Braunschweig, Alexander Joel. Accessed 27 October 2009 (in German).
- Summa Cum Laude International Youth Music Festival, Alexander Joel, Conductor. Accessed 27 October 2009
- Tallmer, Jerry, "Billy Joel grapples with the past", The Villager, Vol. 73, Issue 11, July 16–22, 2003. Accessed 27 October 2009
