= Charlotte Joël =

German photographer

- Signature (1926)
- Born: September 13, 1882 or 1887; Berlin, Germany
- Died: after April 19, 1943; Auschwitz II-Birkenau
- Known for: Portrait photographs

Charlotte Joël (1882 or 1887–1943) was a German photographer.

== Career ==
Rubber stamp imprint of the photo studio

Joël teamed up with photographer Marie Heinzelmann around 1918 and opened the photo studio Joël & Heinzelmann in Charlottenburg. She was mainly interested in portrait photography, her portraits of well-known subjects included Walter Benjamin, Marlene Dietrich, Karl Kraus, Hedwig Lachmann or Gustav Landauer.

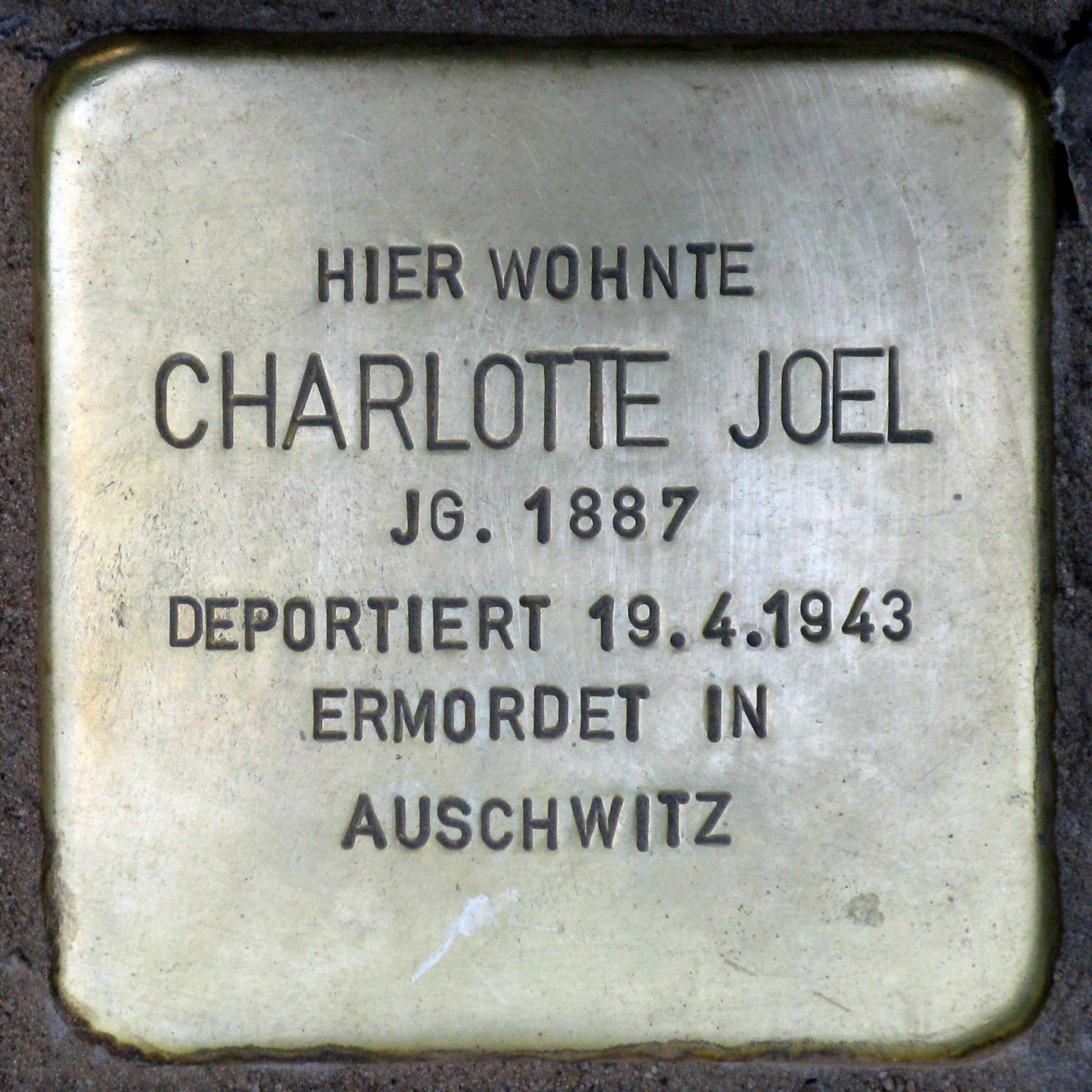
Stolperstein for Charlotte Joel

After Adolf Hitler's rise to power, as a Jew she was no longer able to work in her profession from 1933, but the studio continued under the name "Joël & Heinzelmann" until 1938/39. With the help of her friend Clara Grunwald, Joël came to Landwerk Neuendorf, a Jewish workers' colony and training center, where she worked in the canteen.

== Personal life ==
On April 19, 1943, Joël was deported from Berlin to the extermination camp Auschwitz II-Birkenau on transport no. 37, where she was murdered.

=== Legacy ===
In 2013, a Stolperstein was laid in Berlin at Klopstockstraße 19 for Charlotte Joel.

== Gallery ==
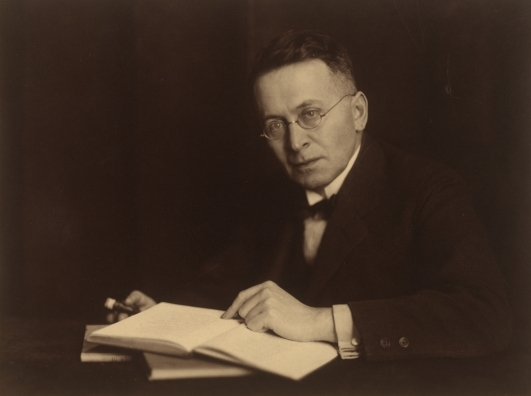
Karl Kraus (1921)

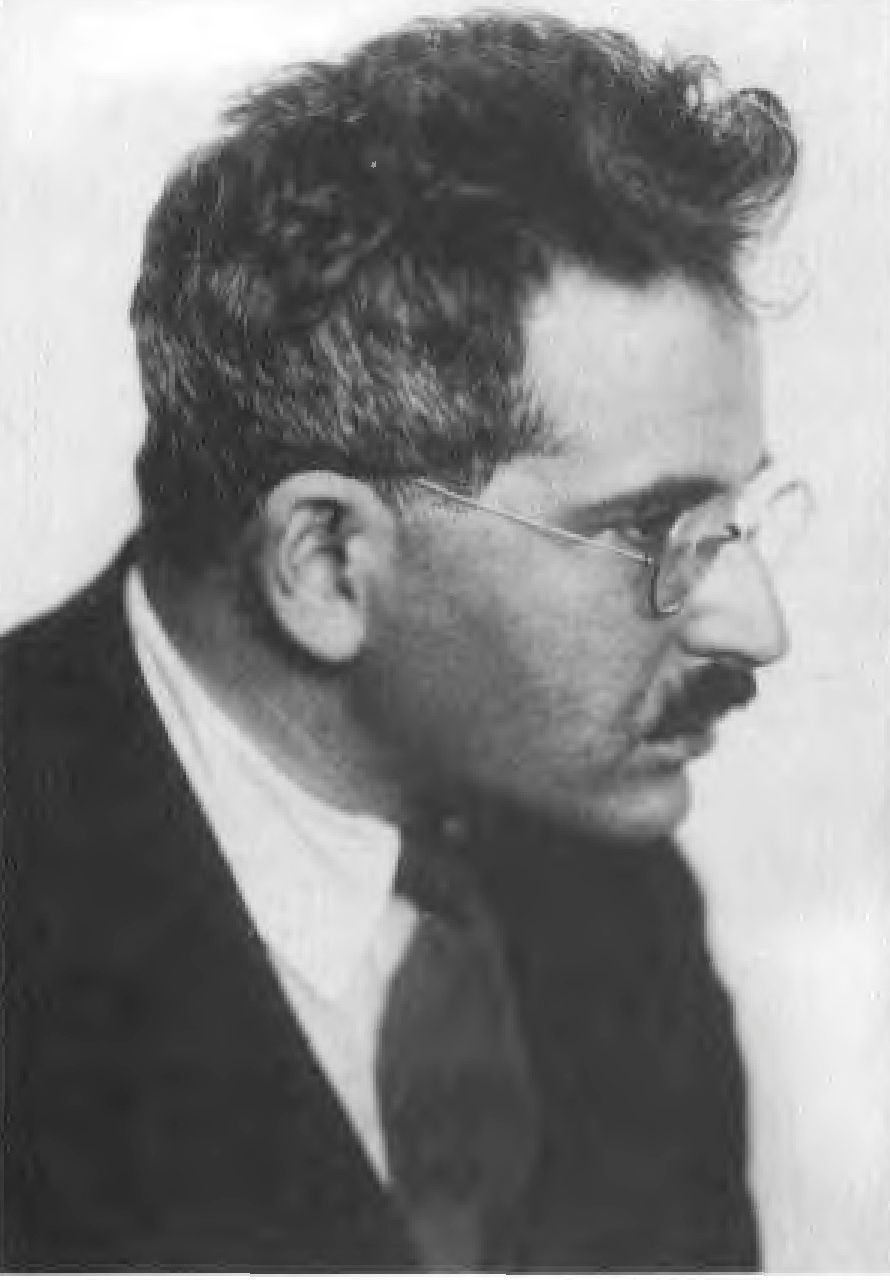
Walter Benjamin (1929)

== See also ==
- List of victims and survivors of Auschwitz
