= Mihály Csokonai =

Hungarian poet (1773–1805)

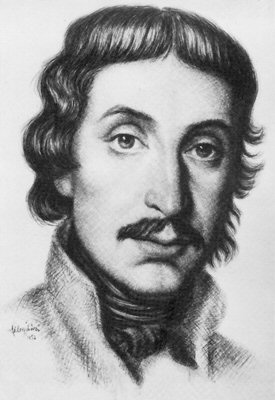
- Born: Mihály Csokonai Vitéz; 17 November 1773; Debrecen
- Died: 28 January 1805 (aged 31); Debrecen
- Occupation: Poet
- Writing career
- Language: Hungarian
- Period: Age of Enlightenment
- Subject: Including Hafez
- Notable works: Kostancinápoly, Dorottya, A Magánossághoz, Szegény Zsuzsi, a táborozáskor, Tartózkodó kérelem, A tihanyi Ekhóhoz, A Reményhez

Mihály Csokonai (full name Mihály Csokonai Vitéz; in Hungarian Csokonai Mihály or Csokonai Vitéz Mihály) (Hungarian: [ˈt͡ʃokonɒi ˈviteːz ˈmihaːj]) (17 November 1773 – 28 January 1805) was a Hungarian poet, a leading figure in the Hungarian literary revival of the Enlightenment.

Having been educated in Debrecen, where he was born, Csokonai was appointed while still very young to the professorship of poetry there. Shortly thereafter he was deprived of the post on account of the immorality of his conduct.

The remaining twelve years of his short life were passed in almost constant wretchedness, and he died in his native town, in his mother's house, when only thirty-one years of age.

Csokonai was a genial and original poet, with something of the lyrical fire of Sándor Petőfi, and wrote a mock-heroic poem called Dorottya or the Triumph of the Ladies at the Carnival, two or three comedies or farces, and a number of love-poems. Most of his works have been published by Schedel (1844–1847).

== Famous works ==
- Kostancinápoly (1794)
- Dorottya (1798)
- A Magánossághoz (1798)
- Szegény Zsuzsi, a táborozáskor (1802)
- Tartózkodó kérelem (1803)
- A tihanyi Ekhóhoz (1803)
- A Reményhez (1803)
