= Manuel Joël =

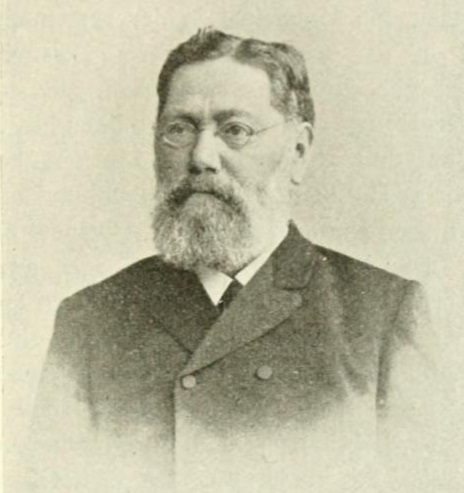

Manuel Joël (or Joel; October 19, 1826 – November 3, 1890) was a German Jewish philosopher and preacher.

== Biography ==
Manuel Joël was born in Birnbaum (Międzychód), Grand Duchy of Posen. His older brother was the rabbi and scholar David Joël.

After teaching for several years at the Breslau rabbinical seminary, founded by Zecharias Frankel, in 1863 he became the successor of Abraham Geiger in the rabbinate of Breslau. He made important contributions to the history of the school of Aqiba as well as to the history of Jewish philosophy, his essays on Ibn Gabirol and Maimonides being of permanent worth. But his most influential work was connected with the relations between Jewish philosophy and the medieval scholasticism. He showed how Albertus Magnus derived some of his ideas from Maimonides and how Spinoza was indebted to the same writer, as well as to Hasdai Crescas. These essays were collected in two volumes of Beiträge zur Geschichte der Philosophie (1876), while another two volumes of Blicke in die Religionsgeschichte (1880-1883) threw much light on the development of religious thought in the early centuries of the Christian era. Equally renowned were Joel's pulpit addresses. Though he was no orator, his appeal to the reason was effective, and in their published form his three volumes of Predigten (issued posthumously) found many readers.

Joël was the chief rabbi of the reform Jewish congregation when the New Synagogue was completed in 1872. He died in 1890 in Breslau.

== Secondary literature ==
- George Y. Kohler, “Manuel Joel in Defense of the Talmud – Liberal Responses to Religious Antisemitism in Nineteen-Century Germany”, Hebrew Union College Annual 79, (2008/2010), p. 141-163
- Görge K. Hasselhoff "Manuel Joel and the Neo-Maimonidean Discovery of Kant", in: James T. Robinson (ed.) The Cultures of Maimonideanism, Brill (2009)
