= Karl Amson Joel =

German-Jewish businessman (1889–1982)

- Born: 20 November 1889; Colmberg, Bavaria, German Empire
- Died: 4 November 1982 (aged 92); Nuremberg, Bavaria, West Germany
- Occupations: Merchant; manufacturer
- Relatives: Billy Joel (grandson); Alexander Joel (grandson); Alexa Ray Joel (great granddaughter)
- Family: German American Joel family

Karl Amson Joel (20 November 1889 – 4 November 1982) was a German textile merchant and manufacturer with Joel Macht Fabrik. He was the grandfather of American musician Billy Joel and British conductor Alexander Joel, who are half-brothers.

== Early life ==
Karl Amson Joel was born in 1889 in Colmberg, into a Jewish family involved in the textile business.

== Career ==
Joel founded a Nuremberg-based mail order textile and clothing company in 1928. The following year he also started manufacturing. Joel's company soon became one of the leading mail order sellers in Germany (along with Quelle, or Schöpflin).

After the rise to power of Nazism (1933), Joel was increasingly discriminated against by the regional Nazi Party leaders, especially Julius Streicher. Joel moved his company to Berlin in 1934, where he rented a factory site in Wedding and installed new packing machines. The stitching department, however, had to remain in Nuremberg. As discrimination further increased (e.g., deliveries had to be marked with a "J" for Jude, or Jew), and Jewish firms became Aryanized, Joel was forced to sell his company in 1938 to Josef Neckermann. The original agreement of 2.3 million marks was further reduced by Neckermann to 1.1 million marks. The money was transferred to a trust account at the banking house Hardy & Co. in Berlin.

Meanwhile, Joel and his wife Meta had emigrated to Switzerland in July 1938. Their son Helmut (later called Howard) attended boarding school there. As a so-called "Devisenausländer" (currency foreigner), Joel could not get access to the trust account in Berlin. In August 1938 his German citizenship was withdrawn, and his firm was confiscated the following month. Via France and England, the Joels left Europe. They emigrated to Cuba. Finally, they reached the United States, where Joel started a new enterprise in 1942 in New York City. They had not been able to emigrate directly to the US because of its quotas. Their son Helmut Joel completed college there and became an engineer. He married and had two children; his son Billy Joel became one of the world's most successful and popular musicians. In 1957, Helmut and his wife divorced and he returned to Europe, finally settling in England, where he married again and had a second son, Alexander Joel, who became a conductor.

In 1957 Karl Joel was compensated 2 million German marks for his former company by Neckermann, who ran the most successful German mail order selling company at the time. In 1964 Joel returned to Nuremberg, where he lived until his death on 4 November 1982.
