= David ben Naphtali Fränkel =

German rabbi (c. 1704–1762)

Personal life
- Born: c. 1704 Berlin, Prussia
- Died: 4 April 1762 Berlin, Prussia

Religious life
- Religion: Judaism

David ben Naphtali Fränkel or David Hirschel Fränkel (Hebrew: דוד בן נפתלי הירש פרנקל; c. 1704 – 4 April 1762), was a German rabbi.

== Biography ==
Born in Berlin, for a time he was rabbi of Dessau. He became chief rabbi of Berlin in 1742. Fränkel exercised a great influence as teacher over Moses Mendelssohn, who followed him to the Prussian capital. It was Fränkel who introduced Mendelssohn to Maimonides' Moreh Nevuchim, and it was he, too, who befriended his poor disciple, procuring for him free lodging and a few days' board every week in the house of Hayyim Bamberger. His grandson was Jonah Frankel, the German Jewish businessman, banker and philanthropist.

As a Talmudist, Frankel was almost the first to devote himself to a study of the Jerusalem Talmud, which had been largely neglected.

== Writings ==
He gave a great impetus to the study of this work by his Korban ha-Edah ("The Communal Sacrifice"), a commentary in three parts. His additional notes on the Jerusalem Talmud and on Maimonides were published, together with the preceding work, under the title Shirei Korban (Dessau, 1743). Amid the turmoil of the Seven Years' War, he delivered a sermon with the following title:

„Eine Danck-Predigt wegen des wichtigen und wundervollen Siegs : welchen Sr. Königl. Maj. in Preussen am 5ten December, 1757, über die, der Anzahl nach ihm weit überlegene, gesamte oesterreichische Armee in Schlesien, preisswürdig erfochten". Gehalten am Sabbath den 10ten desselben Monats in der Juden Schule zu Berlin, von David Hirschel Fränckel, Ober Rabbi ["A Thanksgiving Sermon, for the Important and Astonishing Victory Obtain’d on 5 December 1757, by the Glorious King of Prussia, over the United and Far Superior Forces of the Austrians in Silesia." Preach’d on the Sabbath of the 10th of the Said Month, at the Synagogue of the Jews in Berlin, by David Hirschel Franckel, Arch-Rabbi].
