= Jacob Joseph Oettinger =

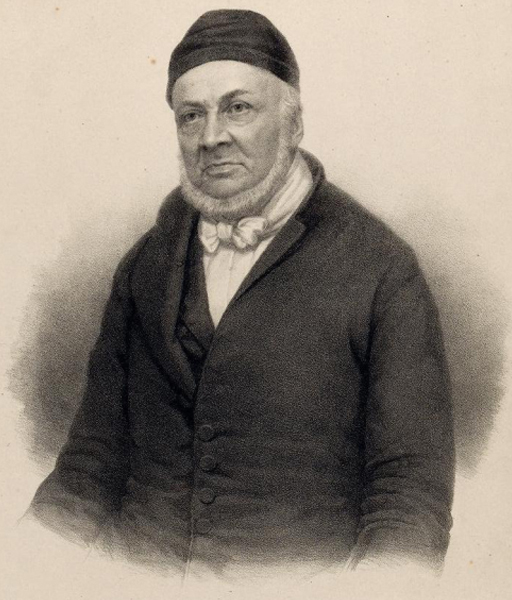

Personal life
- Born: הרב יעקב יוסף עטטינגר; 1780 Glogau, Silesia, Prussia
- Died: 1860 (aged 79–80) Berlin, Germany

Religious life
- Religion: Judaism
- Position: Chief Rabbi of Berlin
- Began: 1825
- Ended: 1860

Rabbi Jacob Joseph Oettinger (Hebrew: הרב יעקב יוסף עטטינגר 1780 – 1860), a native of Glogau, acted as the final chief rabbi of Berlin between 1825 and 1860, and served for some time as the dean of Berlin's rabbinical college. Oettinger was also known as an opponent of Leopold Zunz.
