= Isaac Hirsch Weiss =

Austrian Talmudist and historian (1815 – 1905)

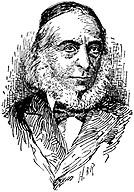
Portrait of Isaac Hirsch Weiss, from 1906 Jewish Encyclopedia.

Isaac (Isaak) Hirsch Weiss, also Eisik Hirsch Weiss (Hebrew: יצחק הירש ווייס) (9 February 1815 – 1 June 1905), was an Austrian Talmudist and historian of literature born at Groß Meseritsch, Habsburg Moravia.

After having received elementary instruction in Hebrew and Talmud in various chadorim of his native town, he entered, at the age of eight, the yeshiva of Moses Aaron Tichler (founded at Velké Meziříčí in 1822), where he studied Talmud for 5 years. He then studied at home under a tutor, and later in the yeshiva of Trebitsch, Moravia, under Ḥayyim Joseph Pollak, and in that of Eisenstadt, Hungary under Isaac Moses Perles, returning to his home town in 1837.

== Early abilities ==
From an early age, Weiss began to study Talmud and rabbinics. He felt a keen desire for the pursuit of the secular sciences also, of which he was deprived in his youth, although he had been instructed in German by his private tutor. In some of the yeshibot which he attended instruction was given also in the Hebrew language and grammar, but that did not satisfy Weiss. It was for this reason that he changed from one yeshibah to another, hoping that he would ultimately find one in which his desire for learning would be satisfied. Influenced by Nachman Krochmal, by Rapoport, and by Leopold Zunz's Gottesdienstliche Vorträge, Weiss devoted part of his time to the study of religious philosophy. Talmudic studies, however, occupied the greater part of his time, and during the years that he spent in his parents' home he wrote several pamphlets containing novellæ on Talmudic tractates, as well as on the Shulḥan 'Aruk, Yoreh De'ah and Ḥoshen Mishpaṭ. He also kept up a correspondence with many distinguished rabbis, particularly Joseph Saul Nathanson, and contributed to Stern's Kokebe Yiẓḥaḳ and to Kobak's Jeschurun. To the former he contributed articles on general subjects, as well as verses and a number of biographies, among which that of Rab (Abba Arika) deserves special notice. In the Jeschurun he published several articles on the origin of prayer.

== Activity at Vienna ==
In 1858 Weiss settled in Vienna, where he became corrector for the press in the printing establishment of Samarski and Dittmarsch. Six years later (1864) he was appointed lecturer in the Beit ha-Midrash Academy founded by Adolf Jellinek, holding that position until his death. In Vienna, where Jellinek and other prominent Jewish scholars were congregated, Weiss found greater scope for his literary activity. He immediately turned his attention to a Vienna edition of the Talmud, and the notes with which he provided most of the tractates give evidence of his vast erudition. Then, at the request of Jacob Schlossberg, he wrote a compendium of the laws and observances relating to the ritual; this work, which was entitled Oraḥ la-Ẓaddiḳ, was published by Schlossberg at the beginning of the Seder Tefillat Ya'aḳob (Vienna, 1861). In the following year Weiss edited the Sifra with the commentary of Abraham ben David of Posquières; to this work he added a historical and linguistic introduction in nine chapters, and he provided the text with critical and exegetical notes entitled Masoret ha-Talmud, giving the variants of different manuscripts as well as an index showing the parallel passages in both Talmudim.

In 1864 Weiss took a prominent part in the Kompert trial, publishing a pamphlet entitled Neẓaḥ Yisrael in support of the testimony of Horowitz and Mannheimer with regard to the belief in the Messiah. This work called forth a reply by Nissan Schidhoff, entitled Nesheḳ Bar (Fürth, 1864). See Heinrich Graetz #The Kompert Affair.

In the same year Weiss edited the mishnayot of the treatise Berakhot, giving a list of variants in both Talmudim and a brief synopsis of the contents. A year later (1865) he founded a monthly magazine, Bet ha-Midrash, of which, however, only five numbers appeared. In the same year he edited the Mekilta, to which he added an introduction dealing with the historical development of both Halakha and Aggada, and a critical commentary entitled Middot Soferim.

After the publication of his Mishpaṭ Leshon ha-Mishnah (1867), an essay on the mishnaic language, Weiss began to prepare his stupendous work, the Dor Dor we-Dorshaw (1871–91; see below). Although Weiss had not been successful with his Bet ha-Midrash, he was more fortunate with the Bet Talmud, a monthly magazine which he founded in 1881 with Meïr Friedmann. In this periodical Weiss published numerous articles of his own, most of them treating of the Talmud in general and of Talmudic subjects. No less important are his biographical sketches, among which are those of Maimonides, Rashi, and Jacob Tam (Bet Talmud, i., ii., and iii., and reprinted in book form under the title Toledot Gedole Yisrael). In 1891, on the completion of his Dor, Weiss reedited Isaac Campanton's Darke ha-Gemara, a methodology of the Talmud. His last work in book form was his Zikronotai (Warsaw, 1895), a collection of his reminiscences from his childhood to his eightieth year.

He continued to contribute to various Hebrew periodicals, writing mostly biographies, of which may be mentioned that of Saadia Gaon (in Ha-Asif, ii. 275-293), published before Weiss had attained his thirtieth year, and that of Mannheimer (in Mi-Mizraḥ umi-Ma'Arab, iii. 17 et seq.). In his lectures Weiss was rather free with regard to the text of the Talmud and the Midrashim. He did not hesitate to declare the text faulty when it seemed so to him; but, on the other hand, he was very careful in making corrections. He held also that the words of the ancient rabbis should not be interpreted according to modern conception, such interpretation being liable to result in error.

Isaac Hirsch died in Vienna on 1 June 1905.
To commemorate his contributions to Jewish scholarship or Talmudic studies, the city of Tel Aviv-Yafo has named a street, A. H. Weiss Street, in his honor.

== His Dor Dor we-Dorshaw ==
Weiss's most important production, through which he acquired great renown, is his Dor Dor we-Dorshaw, (דור דור ודורשיו; "Each generation and its Scholars") a work in five volumes. As its German title, Zur Geschichte der Jüdischen Tradition, shows, it is a history of the Halakha, or oral law, from Biblical times until the expulsion of the Jews from Spain at the end of the 15th century. The first volume (1871) covers the history from the inception of the oral law to the destruction of the Second Temple; vol. ii. (1876) treats of the tannaitic period until the conclusion of the Mishnah; vol. iii. (1883), of the amoraic period till the completion of the Babylonian Talmud; vol. iv. (1887), of the geonic period until the end of the fifth millennium (= the middle of the 13th century); and vol. v., of the period of the casuists ("poseḳim") until the composition of the Shulḥan 'Aruk.

As the oral law is in reality the interpretation of the Pentateuch, Weiss thinks that it originated immediately after the redaction of the latter by Moses. The apparent divergencies in the Pentateuch and the various books of the Prophets (as the well-known differences between the books of Ezekiel and Leviticus, and many others) are due only to different interpretations of the Pentateuch in different epochs. It will be seen that Weiss defended the unity of the Pentateuch and vindicated the authorship of Moses. But he believed that Moses himself followed certain traditions current in his time, as it is said that Abraham observed God's commandments and laws (Gen. xxvi. 5). He asserted also that while the Pentateuch contains no simple repetitions of the laws, it contains additions which amplify or limit the commandments laid down in the earlier books.

In the second volume Weiss gives the history of the Mekhilta, Sifra, Sifre, and Mishnah. This volume contains also monographs on the Tannaim which are invaluable to the Talmudic student; without concealing the failings of some, he defends them, especially the patriarchs, against the charges of Schorr and others. In the third volume much space is devoted to the Aggada and the aggadists, and the author does not endeavor to find apologies for those seemingly strange passages in this part of the Talmud which serve as pretexts for those who seek to detract from its value. But he points out the many edifying sentences that are scattered throughout the Aggada, and quotes a great number of them.

As was to be expected, this work, adopted by the majority of Haskalah Talmudic scholars as the standard history of the oral law, called forth replies from some dissenters. Isaac Halevy is known to have written his Dorot ha-Rishonim against Weiss's Dor (mainly in notes at the end of the sixth vol.), and Eleazar Zarkes published a criticism of the work in Keneset ha-Gedolah (iv., part 2, pp. 65 et seq.). Simḥah Edelmann issued a small pamphlet entitled Ma'amar Doreshe Reshumot (Warsaw, 1893), in which he endeavored to make evident Weiss's mistakes, and Simḥah Weissmann, in his pamphlet Teshubot u-Ma'anot Nimraẓot, did not even abstain from personalities. Yehuda Lifshitz wrote a refutation "Dor Yesharim" that received approbations from major Chareidi figures such as Chaim Ozer Grodzinski.

== Jewish Encyclopedia bibliography ==
- Hirsch Perez Chajes, in Rivista Israelitica, ii.126-128;
- Ehrenpreis, in Ha-Maggid, xl., Nos. 5-7;
- Ismar Elbogen, in Ost und West, v.499-502; Jewish Comment, xxi., No. 11;
- Louis Ginzberg, ib. xx., Nos. 18-20;
- N. Sokolow, in Ha-Asif, iv.47;
  - idem, Sefer Zikkaron, pp. 38–39;
- Weiss, Zikronotai, Warsaw, 1895.
- For the Dor Dor we-Dorshaw: Brüll, Jahrb. iv.59 et seq., vii.124 et seq., ix.115 et seq.;
- Heinrich Grätz, in Monatsschrift, xxvi.92 et seq., 133 et seq.;
- Solomon Schechter, in J. Q. R. iv.445 et seq.;
- P. Smolenskin, in Ha-Shaḥar. iii. 182-183.
