= Meir Kohn Bistritz =

- Born: 1820; Waagbistritz, Hungary
- Died: 7 September 1892 (aged 71–72); Vienna, Austria-Hungary
- Relatives: Kalman Kohn Bistritz
- Writing career
- Language: Hebrew, German

Meir Kohn Bistritz (Hebrew: מאיר כהן ביסטריץ, Yiddish: מאיר קאהן ביסטריטץ; 1820 – 7 September 1892) was an Austro-Hungarian Hebrew poet and author. He lived the greater part of his life in Vienna, where he published most of his works.

== Work ==
The first of Bistritz's works was his notes and German translation of Mordecai ben Meir Kalman's didactic poem, Tavnit ha-bayit ('The Shape of the House', 1858). In the following year he published Kol rinnah ('The Voice of Rejoicing'), a Hebrew poem with a German translation, both composed by him on the occasion of the dedication of the new synagogue in Budapest. In 1863 he produced a new and improved edition of the anonymous Arukh ha-kitzur ('Abridged Dictionary'). A year later he edited and published Tziyun le-zikhron olam ('Sign of Eternal Remembrance'), a work in honour of the seventieth birthday of Isaac Noah Mannheimer, containing addresses, songs, and essays in Hebrew and German. He wrote other minor poems, and a humorous essay on the proverb "Wenn die Chassidim reisen, regnet es" (Jüdisch-Deutsches oder Deutsch Jüdisches Sprichwort, Vienna, 1880). He was also the author of a lengthy article in the Hebrew periodical Bet Talmud (iv. 140, 177, 206), to explain the difficult passages in Midrash Tanḥuma, which were pointed out by Jacob Reifman.

Bistritz's last and largest work was the Bi'ur tit ha-yavan (The Cleaning up of the Mire; Presburg, 1888), a vindictive attack on Joshua Heschel Schorr's radical criticism in He-Ḥalutz in explaining the Talmud. The book is full of diatribes against Schorr's personality and is written in abusive and bombastic style. The work closes with sixteen epigrams aimed at another alleged follower of Schorr, Asher Simḥah Weissmann, author of Kedushat ha-Tanakh.

== Publications ==
- Tavnit ha-bayit [The Shape of the House] (in Hebrew and German). Vienna: Gedruckt bei Adalbert della Torre. 1858.
- Kol rina [The Voice of Rejoicing] (in Hebrew and German). Vienna: Gedruckt bei F. Holzwarth. 1859.
- Arukh ha-kitzur [Abridged Dictionary] (in Hebrew). Prague: Verlag von Wolf Pascheles. 1863.
- Tziyun le-zikhron olam [Sign of Eternal Remembrance] (in Hebrew and German). Vienna: Gedruckt bei Adalbert della Torre. 1864.
- Brakha (in Hebrew). London: Abrahams & Son. 1865.
- Shir ḥanukat ha-bayit (in Hebrew). Vienna: Druck von Jacob Schloßberg. 1870.
- Ha-mata'im veha-ḥamisha (in Hebrew). Vienna: Druck von Leo Fein & Co. 1877.
- Birkat ha-melitz (in Hebrew and German). Vienna: Druck von Jacob Schloßberg. 1878.
- Rede gehalten am Sarge des Herrn Joseph Porges (in German). Vienna: Druck von Jacob Schloßberg. 1879.
- Jüdischdeutsches oder deutschjüdisches Sprüchwort? Eine Erörterung des Sprüchwortes, 'Wann die Chassidim reisen, regnet es' (in German). Vienna: s.n. 1880.
- Le-bat Kohen Marat Sara Zilbershtein (in Hebrew and German). Vienna: s.n. 1882. hdl:2027/hvd.hwmn3y.
- Bi'ur tit ha-yavan [The Cleaning up of the Mire] (in Hebrew). Presburg: Druck von Löwy & Alkalay. 1888.
