= Aaron Jonathanson =

Russian writer & poet (c.1815–1868)

Aaron ben Tzvi Jonathanson (Yiddish: אהרן בן צבי יאָנאַטהאַנזאָהן; c. 1815 – 27 July 1868, Kovno) was a Russian Hebrew writer and poet. He worked as a teacher in Vilna until about 1859, when he settled to Yanova. He corresponded with Isaac Erter; and Judah Leib Gordon, who was one of his pupils, remembered him with great affection and thought well of his poetry. Jonathanson was the author of Klei Shir, a collection of poems and epigrams.

Aaron Jonathanson was the great-great-grandson of Jonathan Eybeschutz. His son, Jonas Jonathanson, was a contributor to the Yiddish periodical press in New York City under the pen name "Kal va-Ḥomer".
