= Schlomo Hofmeister =

Austrian rabbi (born 1975)

HaRav Schlomo Hofmeister
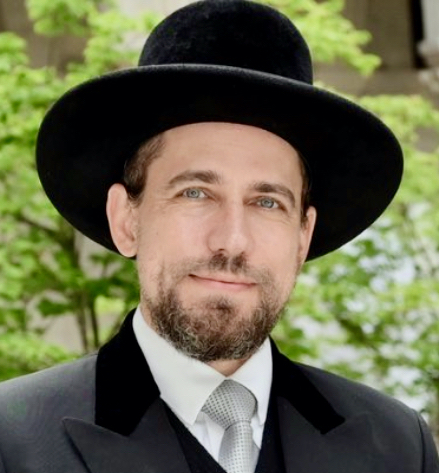
- Hofmeister in 2021
- Title: Chief Rabbi, Landesrabbiner (רב המדינה/רב ראשי)

Personal life
- Born: October 10, 1975 (age 51)
- Spouse: Chana
- Education: London School of Economics

Religious life
- Religion: Judaism
- Denomination: Orthodox

Jewish leader
- Predecessor: Lazar Horowitz 1828-1868 (as Chief Rabbi of Vienna) Hartwig Naftali Carlebach 1931-1938 (as Chief Rabbi of Baden bei Wien) David Herzog 1907-1938 (as Landesrabbiner and Chief Rabbi of Graz) Mordechai Yaffe-Schlesinger 1931-1938 (as Landesrabbiner and Chief Rabbi of Eisenstadt)
- Position: Community Rabbi of Vienna, District Chief Rabbi of Lower Austria, Burgenland, Carinthia and Styria, Chief Rabbi of Graz, Chief Rabbi of Baden bei Wien, Chief Rabbi of the Austrian Armed Forces, President of the Union of Mohalim in Europe (UME)
- Synagogue: Schiffschul, Vienna
- Yeshiva: Etz Chaim (London) Yeshivas Mir (Jerusalem) Toras Shlomo (Jerusalem)
- Organisation: Jewish Community
- Residence: Vienna, Austria
- Semikhah: Moishe Sternbuch, Avrohom Kopshitz, Yitzchak Yosef

Schlomo Elieser Hofmeister (Hebrew: שלמה אליעזר הופמייסטער, born October 10, 1975) is an Austrian rabbi, mohel and author. In 2008, Schlomo Hofmeister, who was then living with his family in London and Jerusalem, was appointed Community Rabbi of Vienna by the Board of the Jewish Community of Vienna and has lived in the Austrian capital ever since - where his ancestors had already resided for several generations after their expulsion from Spain. He also holds the office of Landesrabbiner of Lower Austria, Burgenland, Carinthia and Styria, as well as Chief Rabbi of the Styrian provincial capital Graz, Eisenstadt, and Baden bei Wien. He is also Chief Rabbi of the Austrian Armed Forces.

== Life ==
Schlomo Hofmeister was born into a family of doctors. He studied at various yeshivos in England and Israel, studied social sciences, history and politics at LMU Munich and the University of British Columbia (UBC), and completed his university studies at the end of 2002 with a Master of Science (M.Sc.) degree from the London School of Economics (LSE). In 2004, he moved from London to Jerusalem to continue his rabbinical studies at Rabbi Moshe Halberstam's Rabbinical Seminary Toras Shlomo. Rabbi Hofmeister received semichos in various areas of Jewish law from, among others, Rabbi Moshe Sternbuch, Chairman of the Orthodox Rabbinical Court and Chief Rabbi of Jerusalem. When he received his first rabbinical ordination in 2005, he was the first rabbi in 69 years to be born and raised in Germany and the first German rabbi since his two mentors, Munich Chief Rabbi Pinchas Paul Biberfeld and London Chief Rabbi Josef Zwi HaLevi Dunner, received their ordinations from the Hildesheim Rabbinical Seminary in Berlin in 1936/37.

== Positions and Titles ==
Since 2008, Schlomo Hofmeister is holding the position of Community Rabbi of Vienna. As the most senior Rabbi in Austria, he is independently responsible for all rabbinic contacts and official representations to Austrian and European authorities and political institutions, all interreligious contacts, as well as being the contact person for socio-political issues in the media and the Austrian public.

Since 2012, he has been a permanent member of the Standing Committee of the Conference of European Rabbis (CER). In 2019, Schlomo Hofmeister has been appointed Special Envoy of the Conference of European Rabbis (CER) against right-wing extremism.

From 2011 to 2022 he was Secretary General of the European Beth Din (EBD) under Dayan Chanoch Ehrentreu, and since 2017, in his capacity as Vienna's Community Rabbi, he has been Secretary General of the Vienna Rabbinical Court (Beth Din).

Since 2013, Schlomo Hofmeister has served as president of the Union of Mohalim in Europe (UME).

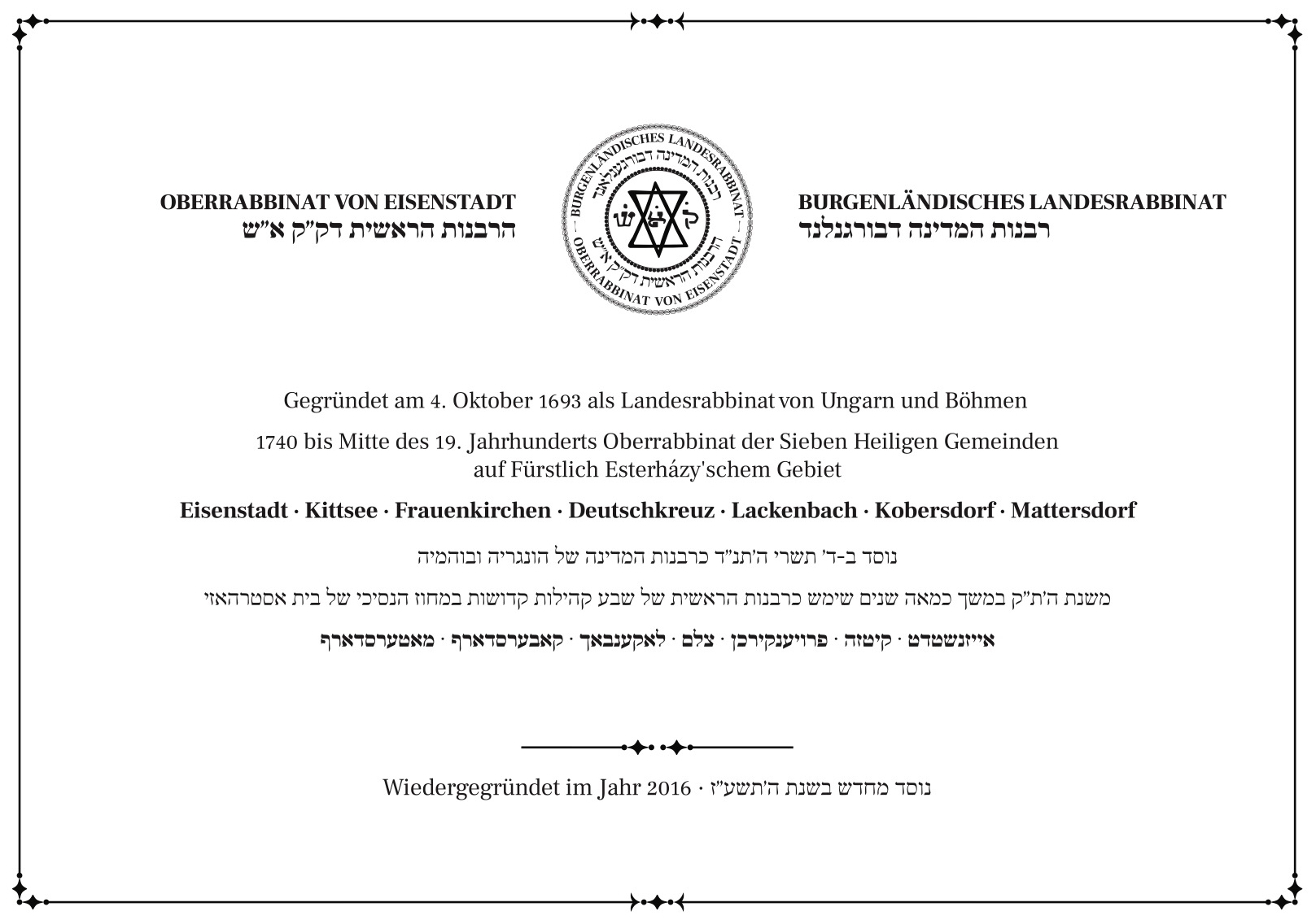
Plaque at the entrance to the "Landesrabbinat" housed in the Wertheimer mansion in Eisenstadt

Since 2016, he holds the position of Landesrabbiner (district Chief Rabbi) of Lower Austria, Burgenland, Styria and Carinthia as well as Chief Rabbi of the cities Eisenstadt, Graz and Baden bei Wien. The history of the Landesrabbinat in Eisenstadt goes back to the foundation of the Landesrabbinat of Hungary and Bohemia in 1693, whose first Landesrabbiner was the famous Viennese Chief Rabbi, Shtadlan and court Jew Samson Wertheimer. Just like his illustrious predecessor, Hofmeister also exercises his rabbinical functions primarily from Vienna.

In 2017, Hofmeister was appointed the first Chief Rabbi of the Austrian Armed Forces in 99 years and as such has since also been responsible for the Jewish military chaplaincy in Austria, which had played a significant role in the monarchy but had been dissolved in 1918.

In 2017 Schlomo Hofmeister was appointed Chief Rabbi of Vienna by the Conference of European Rabbis (CER) and the European Beth Din (EBD), the first rabbi to hold this title since 19th century Vienna Chief Rabbi Lazar Horowitz.

In 2020, Schlomo Hofmeister was officially appointed as Chief Rabbi of the Jewish Communities of Tyrol and Vorarlberg by the board of these united communities. In this role, he is responsible for all rabbinical matters in these two Austrian provinces.

== Publications ==
- סידור תפילת ישורון — Siddur Tefilas Yeshurun, Jeschurun Publishers, Vienna 2010, ISBN 978-3-9502627-0-4
- Reise nach Jerusalem — Ein Imam und ein Rabbiner unterwegs, Amalthea Signum Verlag, Vienna, 2016, ISBN 978-3-99050-043-9
- סידור תפילת ישורון — Siddur Tefilas Yeshurun (Hrsg.), 2nd revised edition, Vienna 2015, ISBN 978-3-9502627-1-1
- סדר זמירות ישורון — Siddur Zemiros Yeshurun (Hrsg.), Jeschurun Publishers, Vienna 2015, ISBN 978-3-9502627-3-5
- ספר דרך החיים והזכרת נשמות — Gebete und Traditionen auf dem letzten Weg und im Andenken an unsere Verstorbenen, Jeschurun Publishers, Vienna 2017, ISBN 978-3-9502627-4-2
