= Kalman Kohn Bistritz =

19th century Hungarian poet

Kalman Kohn Bistritz (Hebrew: קלמן קאהן ביסטריץ) was a Hungarian maskilic poet and epigrammatist, who lived at the beginning of the nineteenth century. He was the author of the Purim drama Goral ha-tzaddikim ('The Lot of the Righteous'), which appeared in Vienna in 1821. He belonged to the same family as Meir Kohn Bistritz.
