= David Caro =

Prussian pedagogue

David Caro (ca. 1782, Fordon, Grand Duchy of Posen—25 December 1839, Posen) was a Prussian pedagogue. He belonged to the school of the Me'assefim, and devoted his great literary talents to the enlightenment of his brethren, to the reform of Judaism, and to the cultivation of the Hebrew language. Under the pseudonym "Amittai ben Abida Achitzedeq", he defended the Hamburg Reform Temple in Berit Emit (Covenant of Truth, Dessau, 1820), the first part of which, Berit Elohim (Covenant of God), was published by the author himself, and the second part, Berit ha-Kehunnah (Covenant of the Priesthood), or Tekunnat ha-Rabbanim (Character of the Rabbis), by Judah Löb Mieses of Lemberg. A new edition of the second part, with additions by Mieses, was published at Lemberg in 1879.

Many of Caro's articles, essays, and poems appeared in Ha-Meassef and in the Bikkure ha-'Ittim. He was a prolific writer, and left a number of manuscripts on literary, lexicographical, bibliographical, and pedagogical subjects. Among his unedited works are a Hebrew translation of Zunz's Gottesdienstliche Vorträge der Juden, with notes and additions; a Hebrew translation of the same author's biography of Rashi, with notes; and biographies of celebrated rabbis.
