= Heinrich Graetz =

Prussian Jewish historian (1817–1891)

Doctor Heinrich Graetz
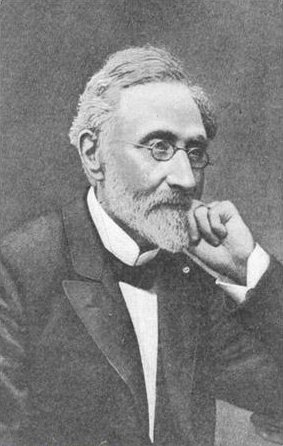
- Heinrich Graetz, c. 1885
- Born: Tzvi Hirsch Graetz; October 31, 1817; Xions, Kingdom of Prussia
- Died: September 7, 1891 (aged 73); Munich, Kingdom of Bavaria
- Education: Breslau University, later University of Jena
- Occupations: Historian, principal, teacher, exegete
- Notable work: History of the Jews
- Spouse: Marie Monasch (m. 1850)
- Children: 5, including Leo

Heinrich Graetz (German: [ɡʁɛts]; 31 October 1817 – 7 September 1891) was a German exegete and one of the first modern historians to write a comprehensive history of the Jewish people from a Jewish perspective.

Born Tzvi Hirsch Graetz to a butcher family in Xions (now Książ Wielkopolski), Grand Duchy of Posen, in Prussia (now in Poland), he attended Breslau University, but since Jews at that time were barred from receiving Ph.D.s there, he obtained his doctorate from the University of Jena. After 1845 he was principal of the Jewish Orthodox school of the Breslau community, and later taught history at the Jewish Theological Seminary of Breslau (now Wrocław, Poland).

His magnum opus History of the Jews was the first Jewish history which threaded together a unified national history across the global Jewish communities. It was quickly translated into other languages and ignited worldwide interest in Jewish history, and later was used as a textbook in Israeli schools. As a result, Graetz was widely considered a Zionist or proto-Zionist, but historians have also noted his support for European assimilation.

In 1869 the University of Breslau (now Wrocław) granted him the title of Honorary Professor. In 1888 he was appointed an Honorary Member of the Spanish Royal Academy of Sciences.

== Biography ==
Graetz received his first instruction at Zerkow, where his parents had relocated, and in 1831 was sent to Wollstein, where he attended the yeshivah up to 1836, acquiring secular knowledge by private study. The Neunzehn Briefe über Judenthum ("Nineteen Letters on Judaism") by Samson Raphael Hirsch, which were published under the pseudonym of "Ben Uziel" at Altona in 1836, made a powerful impression on him; and he resolved to prepare himself for academic studies in order to champion the cause of Orthodox Judaism. His first intention was to go to Prague, to which place he was attracted by the fame of its old yeshivah and the facilities afforded by the university. Being rejected by the immigration officers, he returned to Zerkov and wrote to Hirsch, then rabbi of Oldenburg, indicating his desire. Hirsch offered him a place in his house. Graetz arrived there on May 8, 1837, and spent three years with his patron as a pupil, companion, and amanuensis. In 1840 he accepted a tutorship with a family at Ostrowo, and in October 1842 he entered the University of Breslau.

At that time the controversy between Orthodoxy and Reform Judaism was at its height, and Graetz, true to the principles which he had imbibed from Hirsch, began his literary career by writing contributions to the "Orient", edited by Julius Fürst, in which he severely criticized the Reform party, as well as Geiger's text-book of the Mishnah ("Orient", 1844). These contributions and his championship of the Conservative cause during the time of the Reform Rabbinical Conferences made him popular with the Orthodox party. This was especially the case when he agitated for a vote of confidence to be given to Zecharias Frankel after he had left in protest the Second Rabbinical Conference in Frankfurt in 1845 after the majority had decided against prayers in Hebrew, and for prayers in the vernacular. After Graetz had obtained his Ph.D. from the University of Jena (his dissertation being "De Auctoritate et Vi Quam Gnosis in Judaismum Habuerit," 1845; published a year later under the title "Gnosticismus und Judenthum"), he was made principal of a religious school founded by the Conservatives in Breslau, again under the leadership of Frankel. In the same year he was invited to preach a trial sermon before the congregation of Gleiwitz, Silesia, but failed completely.

He remained in Breslau until 1848, when, upon the advice of a friend, he went to Vienna, purposing to follow a journalistic career. On the way he stopped at Nikolsburg, where Hirsch was residing as Moravian chief rabbi. Hirsch, who then contemplated the start of a rabbinical seminary, employed Graetz temporarily as teacher at Nikolsburg, and made him principal of the Jewish school in the neighboring city of Lundenburg (1850). In October 1850, Graetz married Marie Monasch, the daughter of the printer and publisher B. L. Monasch, of Krotoschin. It seems that Hirsch's departure from Nikolsburg had an influence on Graetz's position; for in 1852 the latter left Lundenburg and went to Berlin, where he delivered a course of less than successful lectures on Jewish history to rabbinical students. His advocacy of Frankel's approach had brought him into close contact with the latter, for whose magazine he frequently wrote articles; and accordingly in 1854 he was appointed a member of the teaching staff of the seminary at Breslau, over which Frankel presided. In this position he remained up to his death, teaching history and Bible exegesis, with a preparatory course on the Talmud. In 1869 the government conferred upon him the title of professor, and thenceforward he lectured at Breslau University.

In 1872 Graetz went to Palestine in the company of his friend Gottschalck Levy of Berlin, for the purpose of studying the scenes of the earliest period of Jewish history, which he treated in volumes one and two of his history, published in 1874–1876; these volumes brought that great work to a close. While in Palestine, he gave the first impetus to the foundation of an orphan asylum there. He also took a great interest in the progress of the Alliance Israélite Universelle, and participated as a delegate in the convention assembled at Paris in 1878 in the interest of the Romanian Jews. Graetz's name was prominently mentioned in the antisemitic controversy, especially after Treitschke had published his "Ein Wort über Unser Judenthum" (1879–1880), in which the latter, referring to the eleventh volume of the history, accused Graetz of hatred of Christianity and of bias against the German people, quoting him as a proof that the Jews could never assimilate themselves to their surroundings.

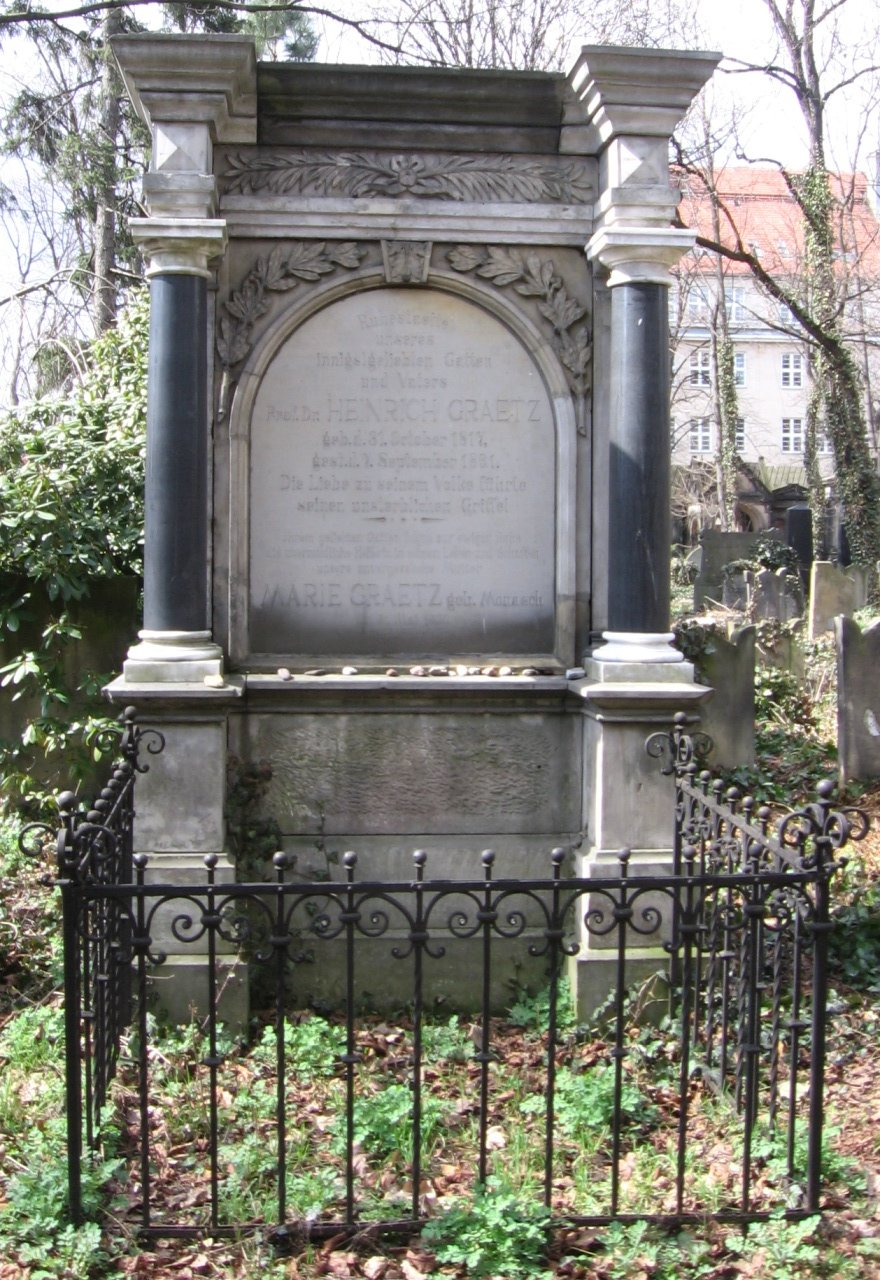
Graetz's tomb in the Jewish Cemetery in Wrocław

This arraignment of Graetz had a decided effect upon the public. Even friends of the Jews, like Mommsen, and advocates of Judaism within the Jewish fold expressed their condemnation of Graetz's passionate language. It was due to this comparative unpopularity that Graetz was not invited to join the commission created by the union of German Jewish congregations (Deutsch-Israelitischer Gemeindebund) for the promotion of the study of the history of the Jews of Germany (1885). On the other hand, his fame spread to foreign countries; and the promoters of the Anglo-Jewish Exhibition invited him in 1887 to open the Exhibition with a lecture. His seventieth birthday was the occasion for his friends and disciples to bear testimony to the universal esteem in which he was held among them; and a volume of scientific essays was published in his honor ("Jubelschrift zum 70. Geburtstage des Prof. Dr. H. Graetz," Breslau, 1887). A year later (27 October 1888) he was appointed an honorary member of the Spanish Academy, to which, as a token of his gratitude, he dedicated the third edition of the eighth volume of his history.

As usual he spent the summer of 1891 in Carlsbad; but alarming symptoms of heart disease forced him to discontinue his use of the waters. He went to Munich to visit his son Leo, a professor at the Ludwig-Maximilians-Universität München, the university of that city, and died there after a brief illness. He was buried in Breslau. Besides Leo, Graetz left three sons and one daughter.

== Works ==
=== History of the Jews ===
Graetz is chiefly known as the Jewish historian, although he did considerable work in the field of exegesis also. His Geschichte der Juden superseded all former works of its kind, notably that of Jost, in its day a very remarkable production; and it has been translated into many languages. The fourth volume, beginning with the period following the destruction of Jerusalem, was published first. It appeared in 1853; but the publication was not a financial success, and the publisher refused to continue it. However, the publication society Institut zur Förderung der Israelitischen Litteratur, founded by Ludwig Philippson, had just come into existence, and it undertook the publication of the subsequent volumes, beginning with the third, which covered the period from the death of Judas Maccabeus to the destruction of the Temple of Jerusalem. This was published in 1856 and was followed by the fifth, after which the volumes appeared in regular succession up to the eleventh, which was published in 1870 and brought the history down to 1848, with which year the author closed, not wishing to include living persons.

In spite of this reserve he gravely offended the Liberal party, which inferred, from articles that Graetz contributed to the Monatsschrift, that he would show little sympathy for the Reform element, and therefore refused to publish the volume unless the manuscript was submitted for examination. This Graetz refused to do; and the volume therefore appeared without the support of the publication society. Volumes I and II were published, as stated above, after Graetz had returned from Palestine. These volumes, of which the second practically consisted of two, appeared in 1872–1875, and completed the stupendous undertaking. For more popular purposes Graetz published later an abstract of his work under the title Volksthümliche Geschichte der Juden, in which he brought the history down to his own time.

The fourth volume of the History of the Jews received a detailed review by Rabbi Samson Raphael Hirsch in a series of essays in Vols. II-IV (1855-8) of his monthly journal Jeschurun. In these essays, Hirsch argues that Graetz is guilty of sloppiness of scholarship: e.g., Graetz omits the second halves of quotations which, if quoted in their entirety, contradict his thesis. Graetz claims, on the basis of quotations from certain Talmudic sages, that they "were wont to do" something – despite sources explicitly to the contrary – and goes on to develop these suppositions into theories affecting the entire Torah tradition. Hirsch accuses Graetz of fabricating dates, rearranging generations, overstating results, misinterpreting and distorting the Talmudic tradition to serve his narrative needs. David N. Myers argues that, whilst Hirsch's explicitly goal was to refute Graetz's ideas using purely scientific methods, Hirsch's criticisms of his one-time student's may have been motivated by a complete difference of opinion on the value of historicism. "Hirsch came to regard his erstwhile disciple as the embodiment of history's destructive tendencies."

A translation into English was begun by S. Tuska, who in 1867 published in Cincinnati a translation of part of Vol. IX under the title "Influence of Judaism on the Protestant Reformation". The fourth volume was translated by James K. Gutheim under the auspices of the American Jewish Publication Society, the title being "History of the Jews from the Down-fall of the Jewish State to the Conclusion of the Talmud" (New York, 1873).

A five-volume English edition was published in London in 1891-92 as History of the Jews from the Earliest Times to the Present Day (5 vols.; edited and in part translated by Bella Löwy). According to a review in the January–April 1893 edition of Quarterly Review, it "was passing through the press in its English version, and had received the author's final touches, when Graetz died in September 1891". In 1919, the Jordan Publishing Co. of New York published a two-volume "improved" edition, with a supplement of recent events by Dr. Max Raisin. Rabbi A. B. Rhine provided the English translation.

Graetz sought to improve on Jost's work, which he disdained for lacking warmth and passion.

Baruch Ben-Jacob (1886–1943) criticized Graetz' "sad and bitter" narrative for omitting Ottoman Jews. Graetz was also meaningfully challenged by Hermann Cohen and Zecharias Frankel.

=== Exegesis ===
Graetz's historical studies, extending back to Biblical times, naturally led him into the field of exegesis. As early as the fifties he had written in the Monatsschrift essays dealing with exegetical subjects, as "Fälschungen in dem Texte der LXX." (1853) and "Die Grosse Versammlung: Keneset Hagedola" (1857); and with his translation of and commentaries on Ecclesiastes and Canticles (Breslau, 1871) he began the publication of separate exegetical works. A commentary and translation of the Psalms followed (ib. 1882–83). Toward the end of his life he planned an edition of the whole Hebrew Bible with his own textual emendations. A prospectus of this work appeared in 1891. Shortly before the author's death, a part of it, Isaiah and Jeremiah, was issued in the form in which the author had intended to publish it; the rest contained only the textual notes, not the text itself. It was edited, under the title "Emendationes in Plerosque Sacræ Scripturæ Veteris Testamenti Libros," by W. Bacher (Breslau, 1892–94).

The most characteristic features of Graetz's exegesis are his bold textual emendations, which often substitute something conjectural for the Masoretic text, although he always carefully consulted the ancient versions. He also determined with too much certainty the period of a Biblical book or a certain passage, when at best there could only be a probable hypothesis. Thus his hypothesis of the origin of Ecclesiastes at the time of Herod the Great, while brilliant in its presentation, is hardly tenable. His textual emendations display fine tact, and of late they have become more and more respected and adopted.

=== Other literary work ===
Graetz had contributed scholarly articles on Judaism and history to the scholarly periodicals started by Frankel since his graduation from the university in 1846. He continued steadily in this task once the Monatsschrift für die Geschichte und Wissenschaft des Judenthums was firmly established under Frankel's editorship in Breslau, between 1851 and 1853. Frankel and Graetz practically took over the periodical with the leadership of the concept of Wissenschaft des Judentums from its Reform initiators, Leopold Zunz and Eduard Gans. After Frankel's retirement from the editorship in 1869, Graetz took over the task himself for the next 18 years, until he reached the age of 70 in 1887.

Graetz's activity was not limited to his special field. He enriched other branches of Jewish science and wrote here and there on general literature or on questions of the day. To the field of general literature also belongs his essay on "Shylock," published in the Monatsschrift, 1880. In the early years of the antisemitic movement he wrote, besides the articles in which he defended himself against the accusations of Treitschke, an anonymous essay entitled "Briefwechsel einer Englischen Dame über Judenthum und Semitismus" (Stuttgart, 1883). To supplement his lectures on Jewish literature he published an anthology of neo-Hebraic poetry under the title "Leḳeṭ Shoshannim" (Breslau, 1862), in which he made the mistake of reading the verses of a poem horizontally instead of vertically, which mistake Geiger mercilessly criticized (Jüdische Zeitschrift für Wissenschaft und Leben, 1, p. 68–75). A very meritorious work was his edition of the Jerusalem Talmud in one volume (Krotoschin, 1866). A bibliography of his works has been given by Israel Abrahams in The Jewish Quarterly Review (4, pp. 194–203).

==== The Kompert Affair ====
Graetz's essay "Die Verjüngung des jüdischen Stammes", in Wertheimer-Kompert's Jahrbuch für Israeliten, Vol. X, Vienna, 1863 (reprinted with comments by Th. Zlocisti, in Jüdischer Volks-Kalender, p. 99, Brünn, 1903), caused a suit to be brought against him by Sebastian Brunner for libeling him as an antisemite. As Graetz was not an Austrian subject, the suit was nominally brought against Leopold Kompert as editor, and the latter was fined (30 December 1863).

Graetz had interpreted Isaiah chapters 52 and 53 to refer not to the personal Messiah, but rather to the entire people of Israel. Graetz and Kompert were brought to court in Vienna for publishing claims that were contrary to the Catholic faith, as well as contradicting Jewish tradition. Viennese rabbis Isaak Noah Mannheimer and Lazar Horowitz defended Graetz, and Azriel Hildesheimer criticized them for doing so; Isaac Hirsch Weiss published a pamphlet entitled Neẓaḥ Yisrael in support of their testimony.

This case, known as the "Kompert Affair," was important in defining the wedge between Orthodox Judaism and the nascent Conservative Judaism championed by the likes of Graetz and Zecharias Frankel. Thus, within the Jewish fold the lawsuit also had its consequences, as the Orthodox raised against Graetz the accusation of heresy because he had denied the personal character of the prophetic Messiah.

== Legacy ==
Graetz's history became very popular and influential in its time. The material for Jewish history being so varied, the sources so scattered in the literatures of all nations, and the chronological sequence so often interrupted, made the presentation of this history as a whole a very difficult undertaking. Graetz performed his task skillfully, mastering most of the details while not losing sight of the whole. Another reason for the popularity of the work is its sympathetic treatment. Also, Graetz has been credited with finding a copying error in I Corinthians 1:12 which should have referred to a very early Christian teacher. This history of the Jews is not written by a cool observer, but by a warm-hearted Jew. On the other hand, some of these commendable features are at the same time shortcomings.

In his introduction to a 1975 volume of Graetz's essays translated into English, rabbi and historian Ismar Schorsch wrote of History of the Jews: "[It] still remains, a century later, the best single introduction to the totality of Jewish history. ... The extraordinary combination of narrative skill and basic research which was the hallmark of Graetz's work has never been matched."

Some characterize Graetz's main elements of Jewish experience through the ages to be 'suffering and spiritual scholarship', while later Jewish scholarly works like Salo W. Baron's 1937 A Social and Religious History of the Jews, opposed the view of Jewish history as being 'all darkness and no light' and sought to restore balance, by writing a social history. Baron strove to integrate the religious dimension of Jewish history into a full picture of Jewish life and to integrate the history of Jews into the wider history of the eras and societies in which they lived. Baron brought very distinctive views to his scholarship. He inveighed against what he termed the "lachrymose conception of Jewish history," sometimes identified with Heinrich Graetz. In a 1975 interview Baron said: "Suffering is part of the destiny [of the Jews], but so is repeated joy as well as ultimate redemption." According to Arthur Hertzberg, Baron was writing social history, insisting that spiritual creativity and the political situation were all borne by a living society and its changing forms.

== Bibliography ==
- Geschichte der Juden von den ältesten Zeiten bis auf die Gegenwart: 11 vols. (History of the Jews; ^{1}1853–75), impr. and ext. ed., Leipzig: Leiner, ^{2}1900, reprint of the edition of last hand (1900): Berlin: arani, 1998, ISBN 3-7605-8673-2.
