= Jacob Meshullam Ornstein =

Galician rabbinical authority

Jacob Meshullam ben Mordecai Ze'ev Ornstein (Hebrew: יעקב משולם בן מרדכי זאב אורנשטיין; 1775–1839) was a Galician rabbinical authority, who served as rabbi of Lemberg for over thirty years.

== Biography ==
Jacob Meshullam Ornstein was the son of Mordecai Ze'ev ben Moses Ornstein. He spent his youth in Jaroslaw before being called to serve as rabbi in the smaller town of Zolkiev. He succeeded his father as rabbi of Lemberg in 1805 or 1806, a position he held until his death.

Ornstein was also known for his staunch opposition to the Haskalah movement, which sought to bring about social and cultural reform among Jews in Europe. He used his position as rabbi to persecute those who supported the movement, such as Solomon Judah Rapoport and Isaac Erter. Ornstein faced criticism and ridicule from the progressive Jews he opposed, particularly from Erter, who satirized him in his work Ha-tzofeh. He was also opposed to the spread of Hasidism in Galicia.

He was the author of the multi-volume commentary Yeshu'ot Ya'akov on the Shulchan Aruch, as well as a commentary on the Pentateuch. His decisions can also be found in various collections of responsa, such as Yad Yosef and Mayim Ḥayyim.
