= New Synagogue of Graz =

Synagogue in Austria

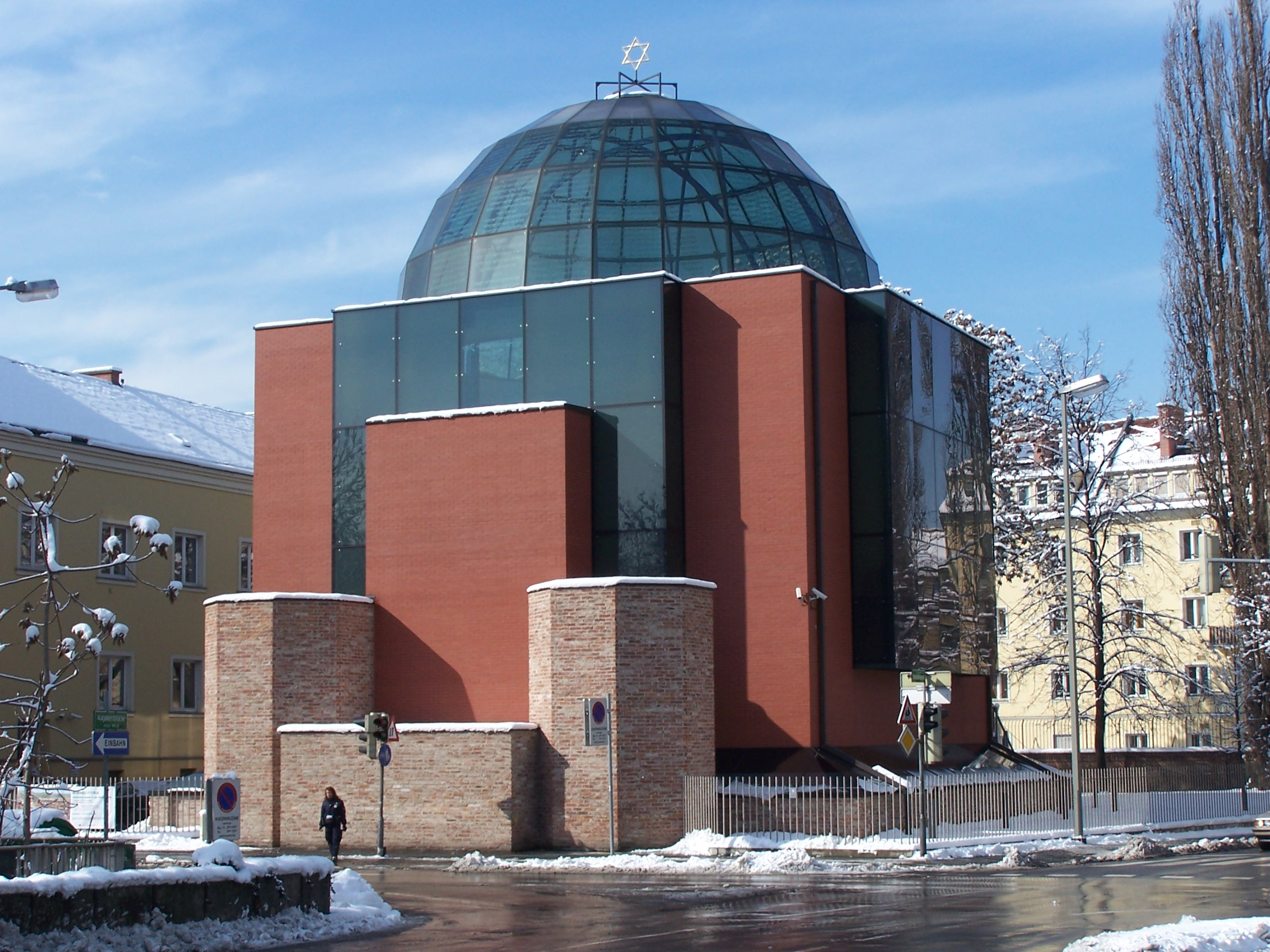
- New Synagogue of Graz in 2006

- Location of the synagogue in Austria

Religion
- Affiliation: Judaism
- Ecclesiastical or organisational status: Synagogue
- Status: Actice

Location
- Location: David-Herzog-Place, Graz, Bundesland
- Country: Austria
- Coordinates: 47°03′50″N 15°26′01″E

Architecture
- Architects: Jörg and Ingrid Mayr
- Type: Synagogue architecture
- Style: Modernist
- Established: 1868 (as a congregation)
- Completed: 2000

Specifications
- Dome: One
- Materials: Brick; (Note: Some sourced from the Old Synagogue.) reinforced concrete; glass

The New Synagogue of Graz is a Jewish congregation and synagogue, located on David-Herzog-Place, on the right bank of the Mur River in the Gries neighborhood, in the city of Graz, Austria. The synagogue serves the Jews of Graz, Styria, Carinthia, and southern parts of Burgenland.

The congregation was established in 1868 and built its initial synagogue in 1895 on this site. Destroyed by the Nazis in 1938 on Kristallnacht, the depleted congregation used temporary premises until the current building was completed in 2000.

== History ==
=== The Old Synagogue ===
Old Synagogue of Graz
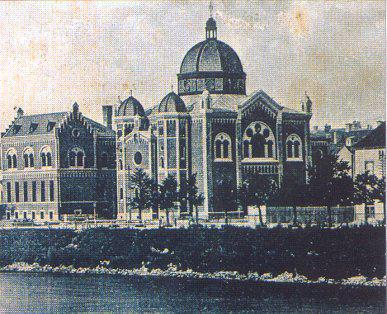
- The old synagogue in 1900, since destroyed

Religion
- Affiliation: Judaism (former)
- Ecclesiastical or organisational status: Synagogue (1895–1938)
- Status: Destroyed

Location
- Location: David-Herzog-Place, Graz
- Country: Austria
- Interactive map of Old Synagogue of Graz
- Coordinates: 47°03′50″N 15°26′01″E

Architecture
- Architect: Maximilian Katscher
- Type: Synagogue architecture
- Style: Renaissance Revival
- Established: 1868 (as a congregation)
- Completed: 1895
- Destroyed: November 9, 1938 on Kristallnacht

Specifications
- Dome: Three
- Dome height (outer): 30 metres (98 ft)
- Materials: Brick

Jews first settled in Graz in the latter part of the 13th century. Expelled in 1439, Jews returned from 1447, however it took until 1868 to officially form a congregation. The community ten grew rapidly, partly because of economic factors and by 1934 there were over 1,700 Jews in Graz. The congregation built a large school by 1892 and the inaugural synagogue was completed. Designed by Maximilian Katscher in the Renaissance Revival style, the imposing square brick building was topped by a dome cupola, 30 metres (98 ft) high.

Despite significant local Antisemitism, (Note: Graz earned special infamy in its eagerness to become the first Judenrein city in Austria. That is, a town completely rid of its Jews.) there was a large influx of Jewish refugees from Eastern Europe in the wake of World War I. During the rise of Austrian Nazism in the latter part of the 1930s, Graz was a center of Austrian National Socialism, leading to the social serration of Jews.

Immediately after the Anschluss, the Jewish cemetery was desecrated. The members of the community board were arrested and released after prolonged negotiation. The congregation made payment of 5,000,000 marks to Adolf Eichmann so the 600 Jews could emigrate to Palestine. However, before that plan was put into effect, on Kristallnacht the synagogue was completely destroyed by explosives and fire. More than 300 Jews were taken to Dachau concentration camp, and released several months later. Of the 1,600 Jews in Graz on Kristallnacht, 417 emigrated. In June 1939, only 300 remained in Graz; most were sent to Vienna and then to the death camps.

=== The New Synagogue ===
After World War II, 110 Jews settled in Graz. There were 420 in 1949 and 286 in 1950. In 1952, the Jewish community of Graz, dissolved in 1940, was re-founded. The community covers the States of Styria, Carinthia and the districts of Oberwart, Güssing and Jennersdorf in Burgenland. A small synagogue in a communal center built on the site of the synagogue ruins was consecrated in 1968. A Jewish community of fewer than 100 members remained at the beginning of the 21st century.

In 1983, artist Fedo Ertl approached the Jewish community with the suggestion of clearing the foundation of the former synagogue site, but this suggestion was rejected due to fears of an Antisemitic reaction from city officials. Ertl found that some of the bricks from the synagogue were reused as early as 1939 in the construction of a garage on Alberstraße.

On October 21, 1998, all parties in Graz's Municipal Council unanimously resolved to reconstruct the synagogue. This decision was taken following the intervention of the then-president of the local Jewish community, Kurt David Brühl.

Architects from Graz, Jörg and Ingrid Mayr, who had already been put in charge of a memorial for the destroyed Jewish cemetery of Graz, worked with Ertl's plans.

Approximately 9600 bricks of the former synagogue were reused in the new building, after being washed by over 150 students of the local state high school in Lichtenfelsgasse, the local vocational technical school, and the Grazbachgasse school of commerce, who worked for over 10,000 hours. A steel black obelisk, constructed on the site of the synagogue in 1988, was incorporated in the project and is now found under the Bimah. The new building was primarily made from brick, reinforced concrete and glass. The cube and sphere create a central space for the synagogue and help it stick out in its exterior appearance.

The new synagogue followed the blueprints of the old synagogue, but on a smaller scale than its predecessor, as the Jewish community of Graz numbered about a hundred members, compared to the 2000 members before World War II. The synagogue was consecrated and opened on November 9, 2000, the anniversary of Kristallnacht.

==== Architecture and conception ====
While the building is largely Modernist, the design of the synagogue does recall several general aspects of the synagogue destroyed by the Nazis.

In the middle of the sanctuary rests a glass Bimah where the Torah is read. Behind the Bimah is the Torah ark where the Torah scrolls are stored. This space is dominated by a glass dome supported by twelve metal pillars (representing the Twelve Tribes of Israel) and creating a Star of David-shaped cupola on the ceiling. The clear blue glass is meant to invoke the unobstructed skies. Hebrew prayers are engraved into the glass through sandblasting.

The synagogue is located at David Herzog Place, named after the last Rabbi for Styria and Carinthia before the Second World War, who escaped Graz after Kristallnact and sought refuge in England.

== Recent history ==
In 2013, the Jewish community of Graz was dissolved following long-term internal conflicts. The synagogue, community center, and other community assets were made part of the Jewish Cultural Foundation of Styria, Carinthia and Southern Burgenland. The community itself was turned into a subsidiary organization of the Jewish Community of Vienna, with responsibilities for the areas covered by the Jewish Cultural Foundation. Since 2016, the organization is headed by a delegate with the title of "president". That position is currently held by Elie Rosen, a well-known member of the Austrian Jewish community.

At the insistence of Rosen, and following the agreement of the Jewish communities of Graz and Vienna and the Chief Rabbi of Vienna, the Rabbinate of Styria (with jurisdiction over Styria, Carinthia, and Burgenland) which had been dissolved in 1938, was re-established on December 1, 2016. That same day, for the first time since 1938, Vienna Rabbi Schlomo Hofmeister was named Chief Rabbi of Graz.

In 2021, an Austrian man was handed a three-year custodial sentence for vandalizing the synagogue and other antisemitic attacks.

== Notable members ==
- de:David Herzog, historian and rabbi of Graz from 1908 to 1938
- Otto Loewi, a Nobel Prize laureate who taught pharmacology at Graz University from 1909 to 1938

== Gallery ==
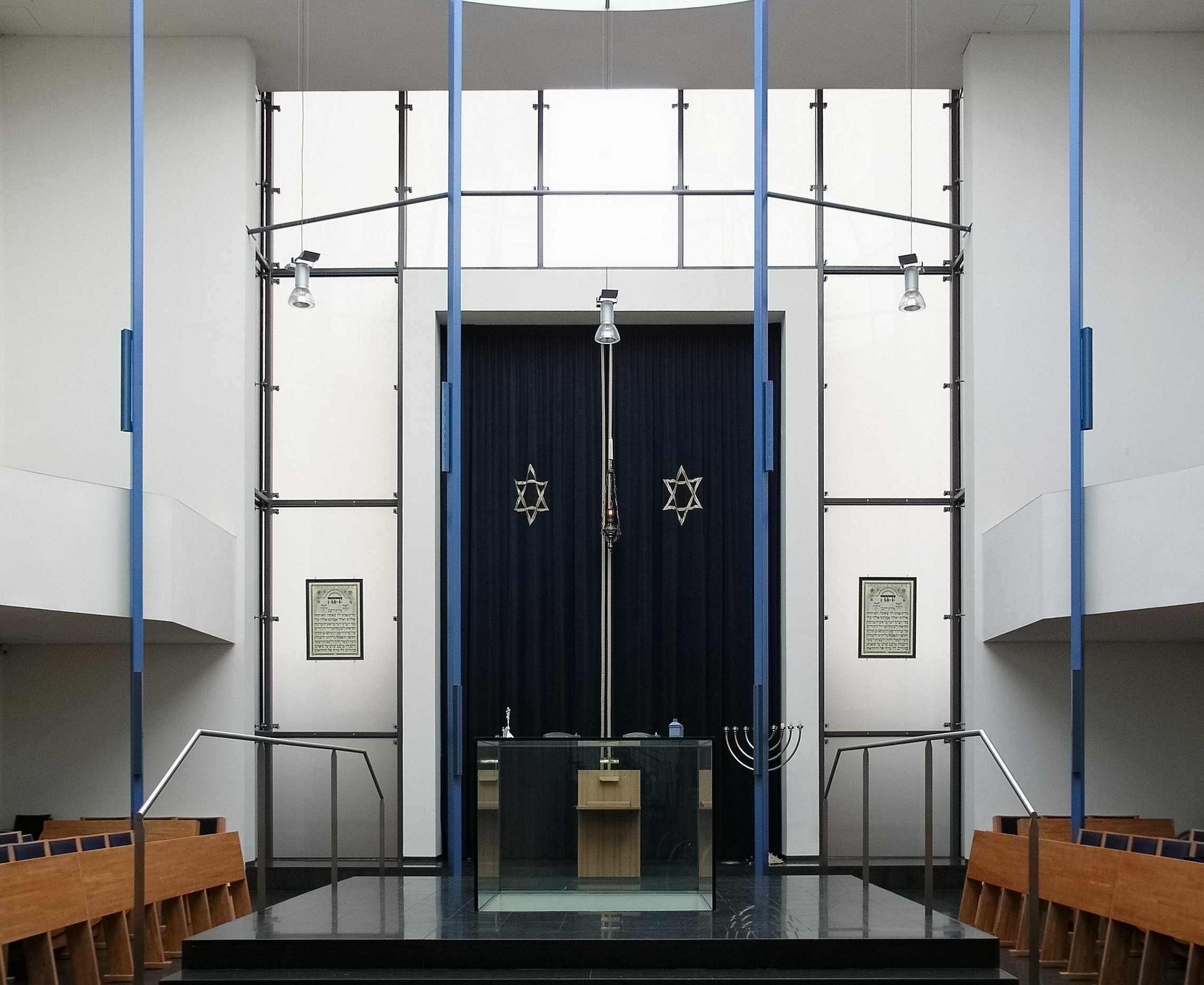
Interior of the synagogue with the Bimah and the Holy Ark in the back

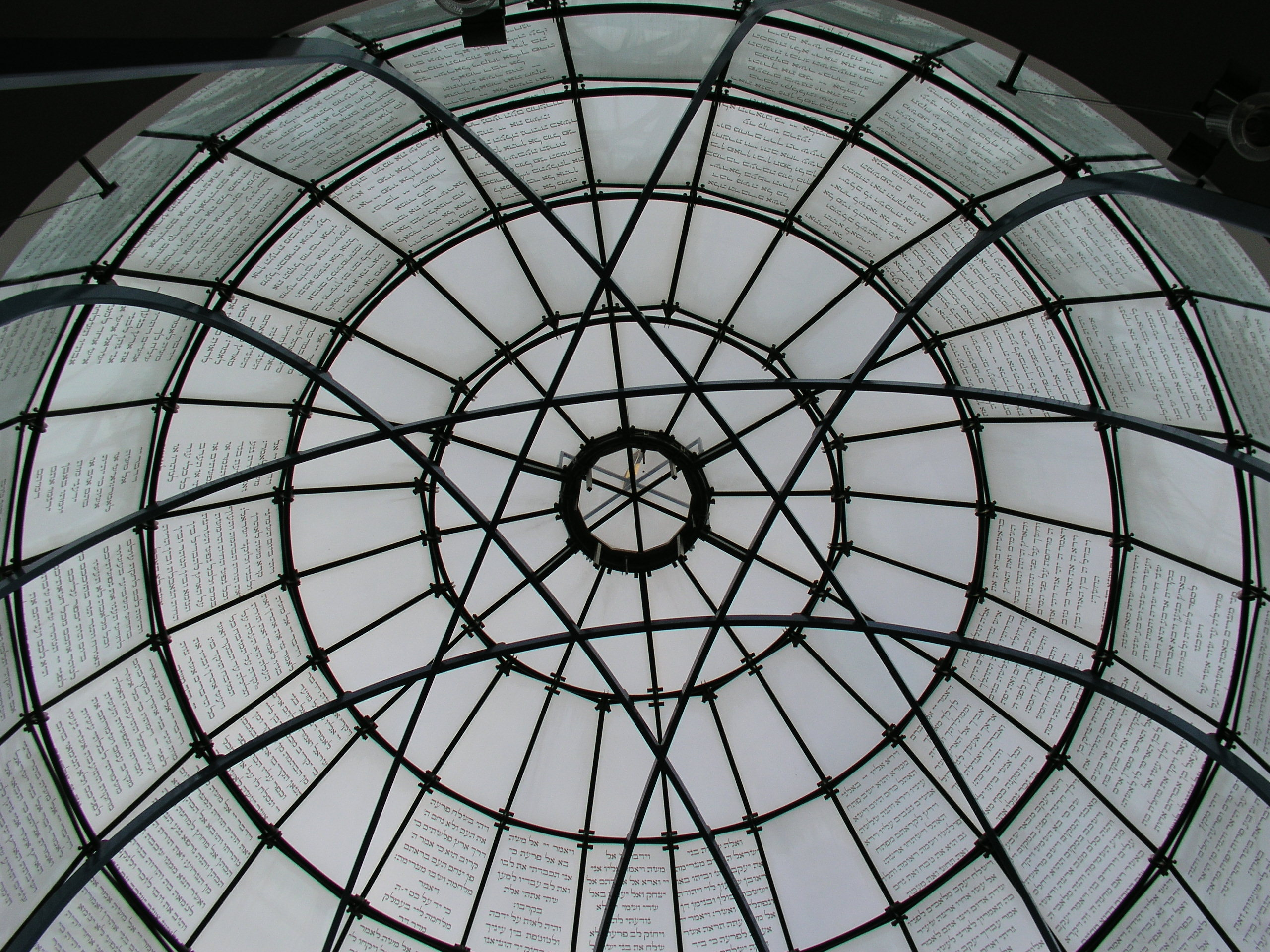
Interior of the cupola with the Star of David

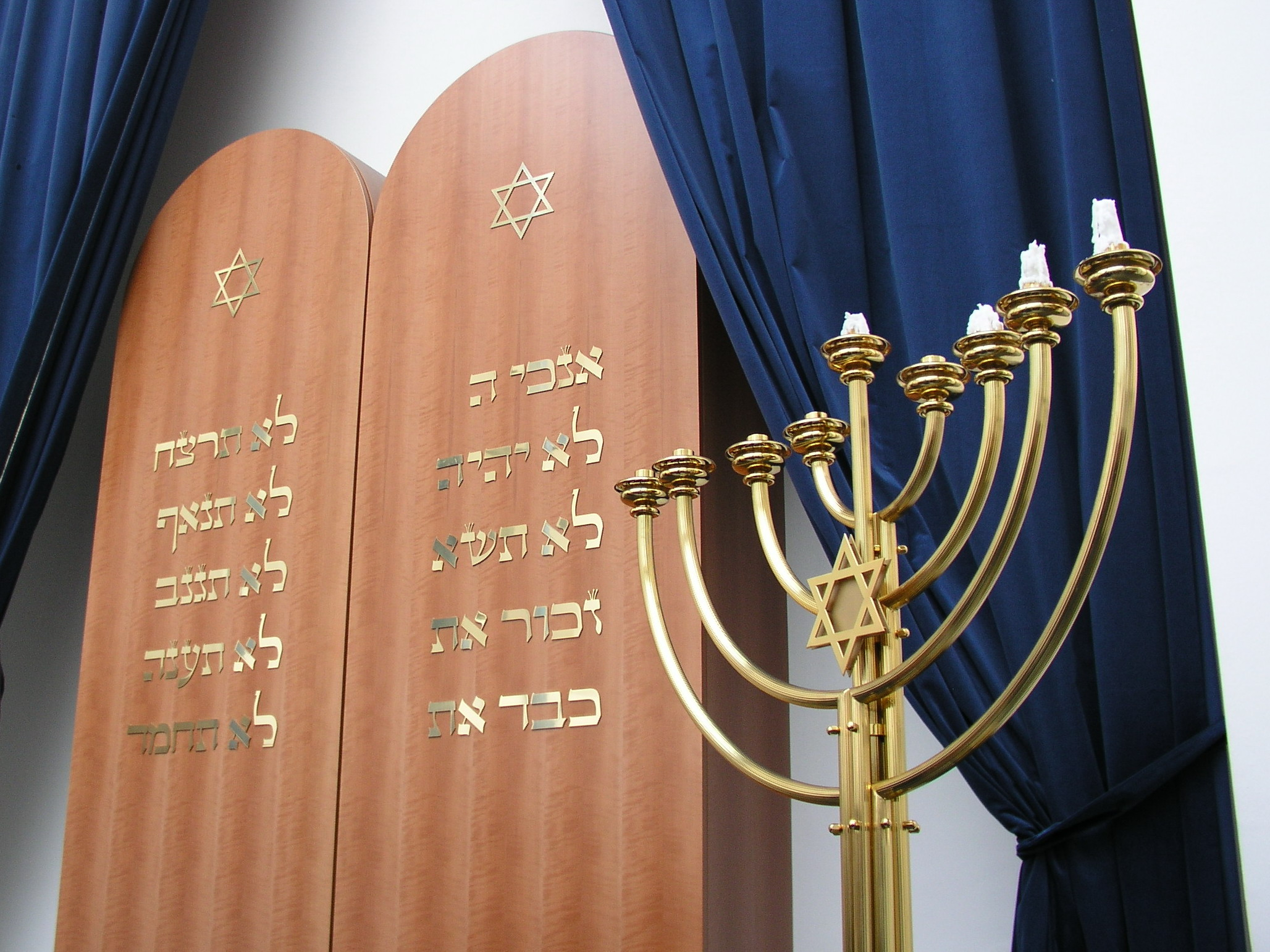
Holy Ark with doors shaped like the Ten Commandments

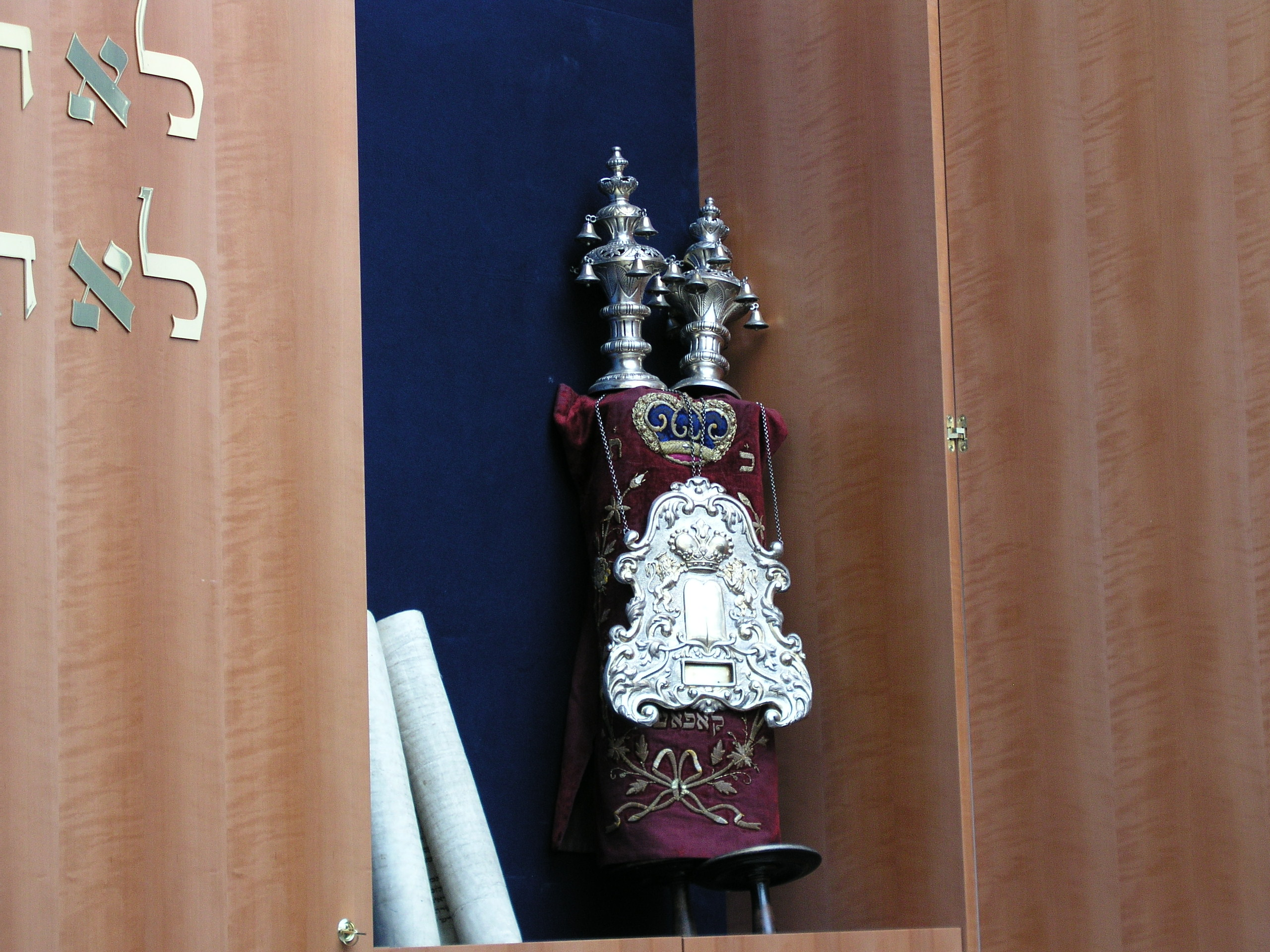
Open Ark with Torah scrolls

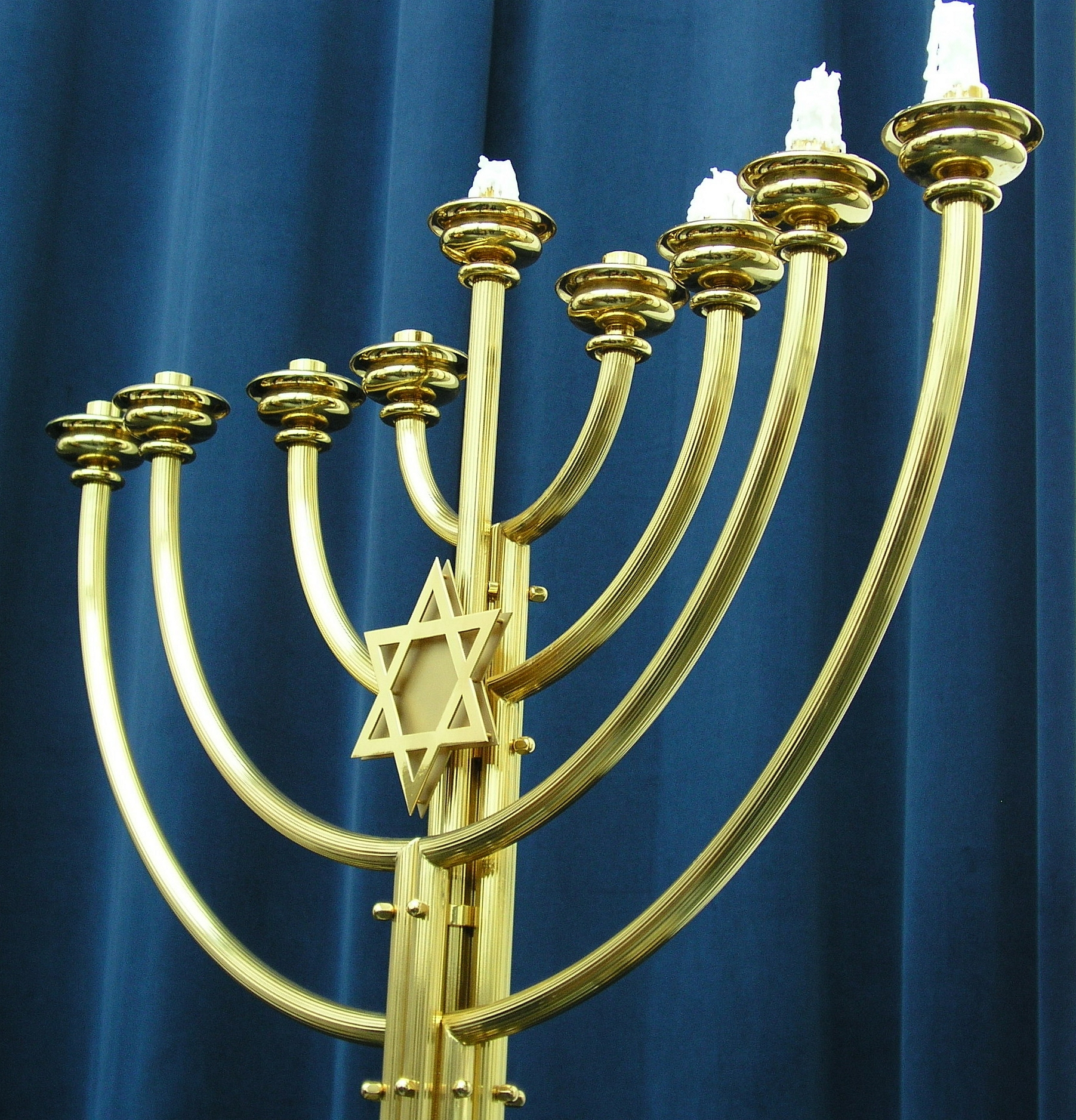
Chanukkiah

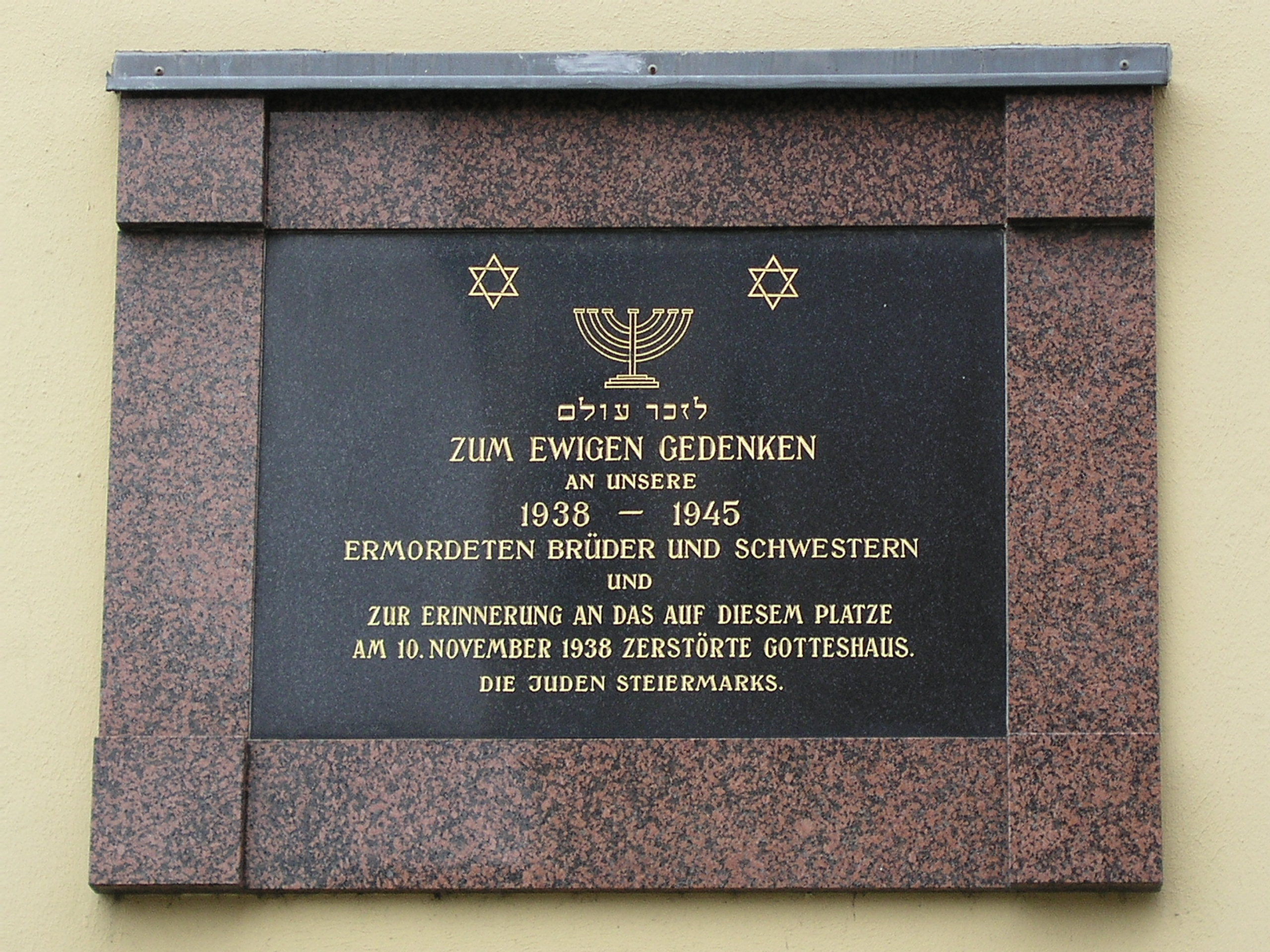
Commemorative plaque

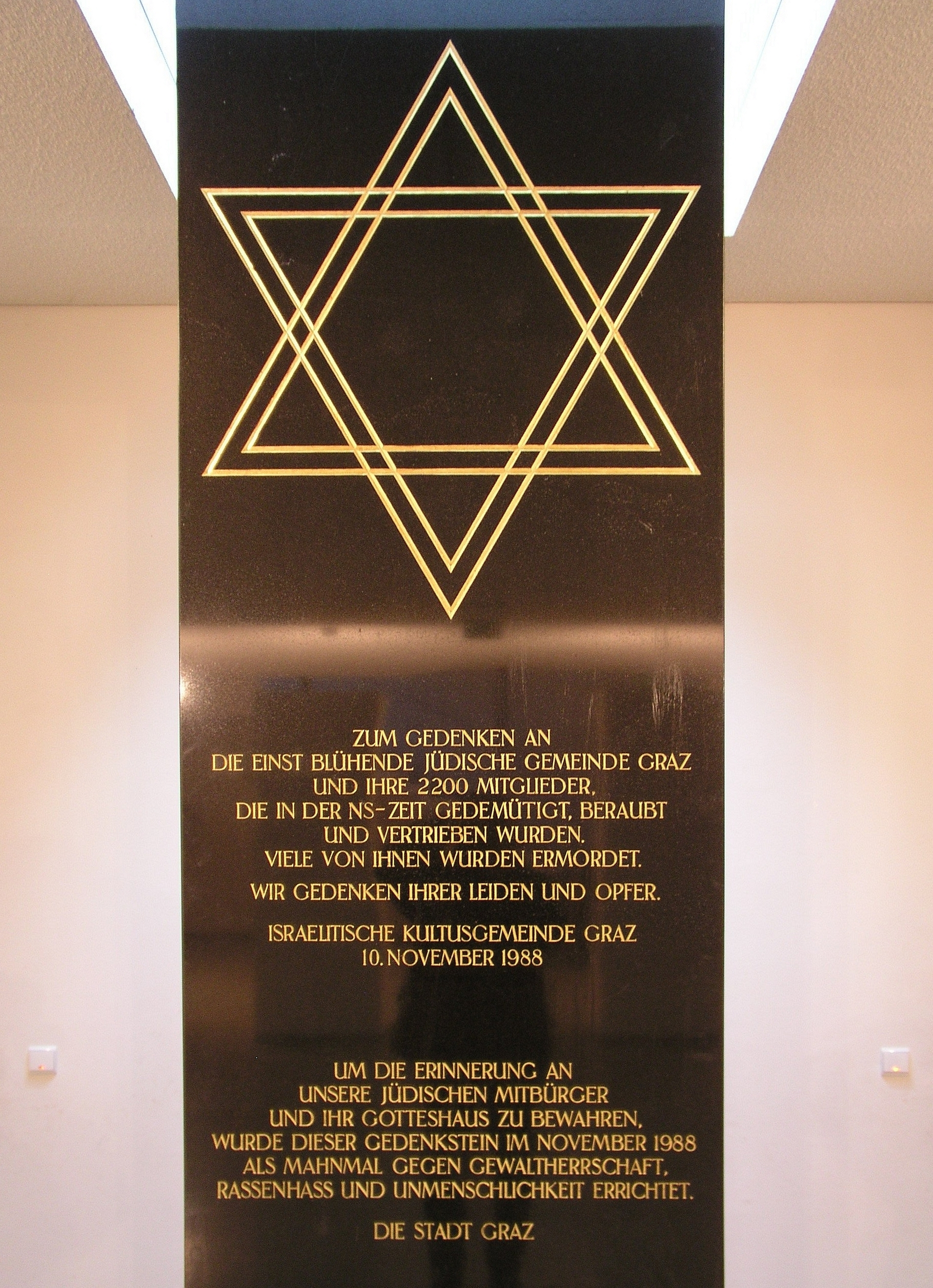
Commemorative plaque

== See also ==
- History of the Jews in Austria
