= Judah Löb Mieses =

Galician writer and Maskil

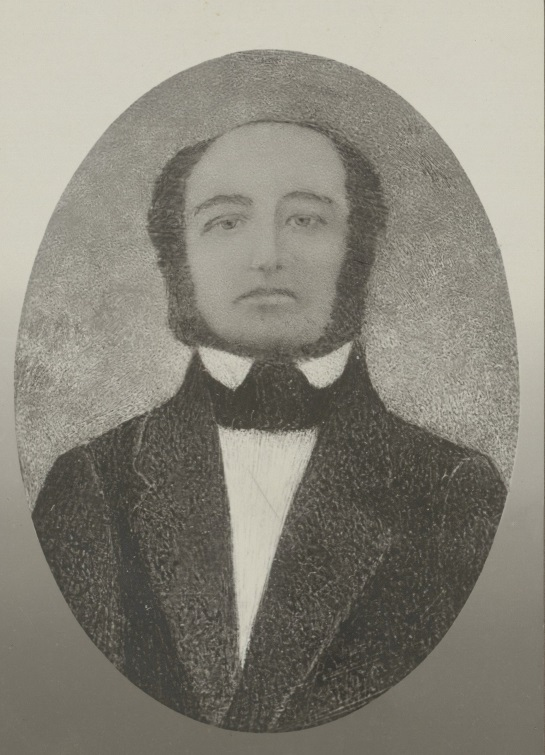
- Born: c. 1798; Lemberg, Galicia, Habsburg Empire
- Died: 26 June 1831; Lemberg, Galicia, Austrian Empire
- Writing career
- Language: Hebrew
- Literary movement: Haskalah

Judah Löb Mieses (Hebrew: יהודה ליב מיזס; c. 1798 – 26 June 1831) was a Galician writer and Maskil.

== Biography ==
Judah Löb Mieses was born into a wealthy rabbinic family in Lemberg, Galicia (today Lviv, Ukraine), and was educated in both Jewish and secular subjects.

He made his house the centre of a literary circle, supporting and guiding young Maskilim like Isaac Erter, to whom he offered use of his extensive library. He also provided financial assistance to yeshiva students to attend universities in Germany and Austria.

He died in the cholera epidemic of 1831.

== Work ==
Mieses was a strong opponent of Hasidism. His main work, Kin'at ha-Emet (Vienna, 1828; 2nd ed., Lemberg, 1879), contains an introduction and three dialogues between Maimonides and Solomon of Chelm. In it Mieses advocates for a "pure Judaism" free from superstitious beliefs. He sharply criticizes Hasidic leaders for spreading superstition, and for exploiting the credulity of the ignorant masses. He appends to his book, under the title Likkute Feraḥim, extracts from the writings of Judah ha-Levi, Joseph ibn Ezra, Kimhi, Albo, Abravanel, Joseph Delmedigo, and others, in support of his views.

He also wrote additions to David Caro's Tekunat ha-Rabbanim, which include a plan for modern Jewish education.
