= Tashlikh =

Jewish atonement ritual

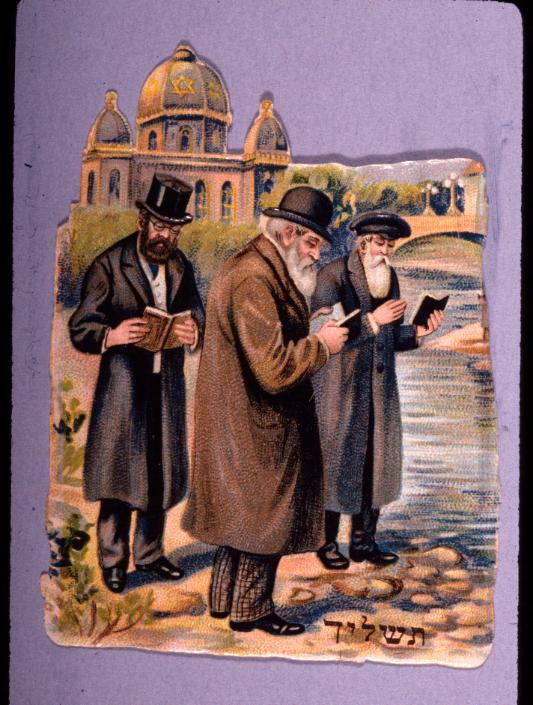
Holiday card depicting Tashlikh (early 20th century)

Tashlikh or Tashlich (Hebrew: תשליך "cast off") is an customary Jewish atonement ritual performed during the High Holy Days on Rosh Hashanah for Ashkenazi Jews. In some Judaeo-Spanish-speaking communities the practice is referred to as sakudirse las faldas ('to shake the flaps [of clothing]') or simply as faldas.

== Practice ==
The ritual is performed at a large, natural body of flowing water (e.g., river, lake, sea, or ocean) on the afternoon of the first day of Rosh Hashanah, the Jewish New Year, although it may be performed until Hoshana Rabbah. If the first day of Rosh Hashanah falls on Shabbat, most Ashkenazim recite Tashlich on the second day of Rosh Hashanah, whereas most Sephardim recite it on the first day as normal. The penitent recites a Biblical passage and, optionally, additional prayers. During the Tashlikh prayer, the worshipers symbolically throw their sins into a source of water. Some people throw small pieces of bread into the water, though many rabbis consider throwing bread into the water on Rosh Hashanah to be forbidden by halakha.

== Origin of the custom ==
=== Scriptural source ===
The name "Tashlikh" and the practice itself are derived from an allusion mentioned in the Biblical passage (Micah 7:18–20) recited at the ceremony: "You will cast (tashlikh) all their sins into the depths of the sea."

=== Possible early sources ===
- Josephus (c. 100) refers to the decree of the Halicarnassians permitting Jews to "perform their holy rites according to the Jewish laws and to have their places of prayer by the sea, according to the customs of their forefathers". However, there was an ancient Jewish custom to site synagogues of the Jewish diaspora on the seashore as an expression of desire to return to Zion.
- The Zohar (c. 1290) states that "whatever falls into the deep is lost forever; ... it acts like the scapegoat for the ablution of sins". Some believe that this is a reference to the tashlikh ritual.

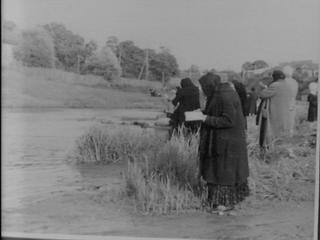
On a river bank "in a small town" (English caption) women bend over prayerbooks during Tashlikh (1920s-1930s, Lithuania).

=== Maharil ===
Most Jewish sources trace the custom back to Yaakov ben Moshe Levi Moelin (d. 1427 in Worms) in his Sefer Maharil, where he explains the custom as a reminder of the binding of Isaac, and the general impression has therefore been that it originated not earlier than the fourteenth century, with the German Jews. Moelin recounts a midrash about that event, according to which Satan threw himself across Abraham's path in the form of a deep stream, in an attempt to prevent Abraham from sacrificing Isaac on Moriah. Abraham and Isaac nevertheless plunged into the river up to their necks and prayed for divine aid, whereupon the river disappeared.

Moelin, however, forbids the practise of throwing pieces of bread to the fish in the river, especially on Shabbat. This would seem to indicate that in his time tashlikh was duly performed, even when the first day of Rosh Hashanah fell on the Sabbath, though in later times the ceremony was, on such occasions, deferred one day.

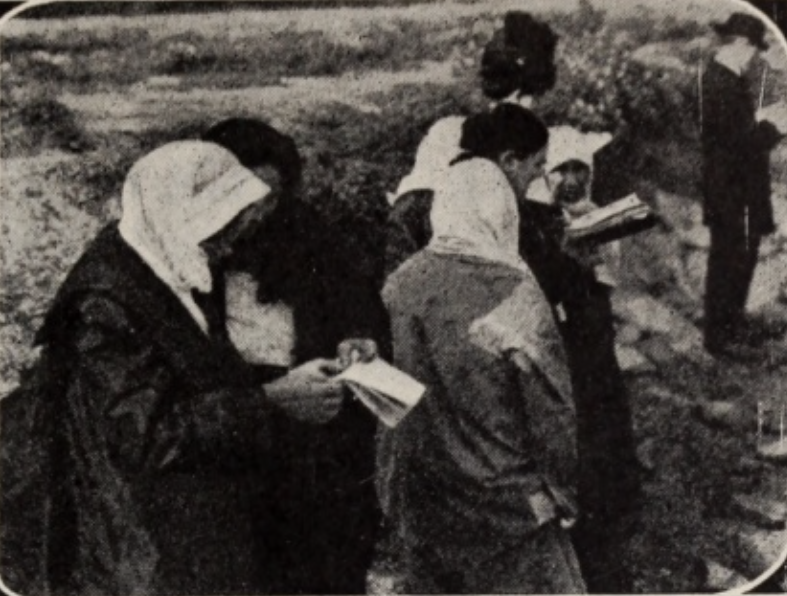
At Lake Ontario (before 1916)

=== Shelah ===
Rabbi Isaiah Horowitz (born 1555 in Prague — died 1630 in Tiberias) offers the earliest written source explaining the significance of allusions to fish in relation to this custom. In his eponymous treatise, Shelah (214b), he writes:

- Fish illustrate man's plight, and arouse him to repentance: "As the fishes that are taken in an evil net" (Ecclesiastes 9:12);
- Fish, in that they have no eyelids and their eyes are always wide open, allude to the omniscience of the Creator, who does not sleep.

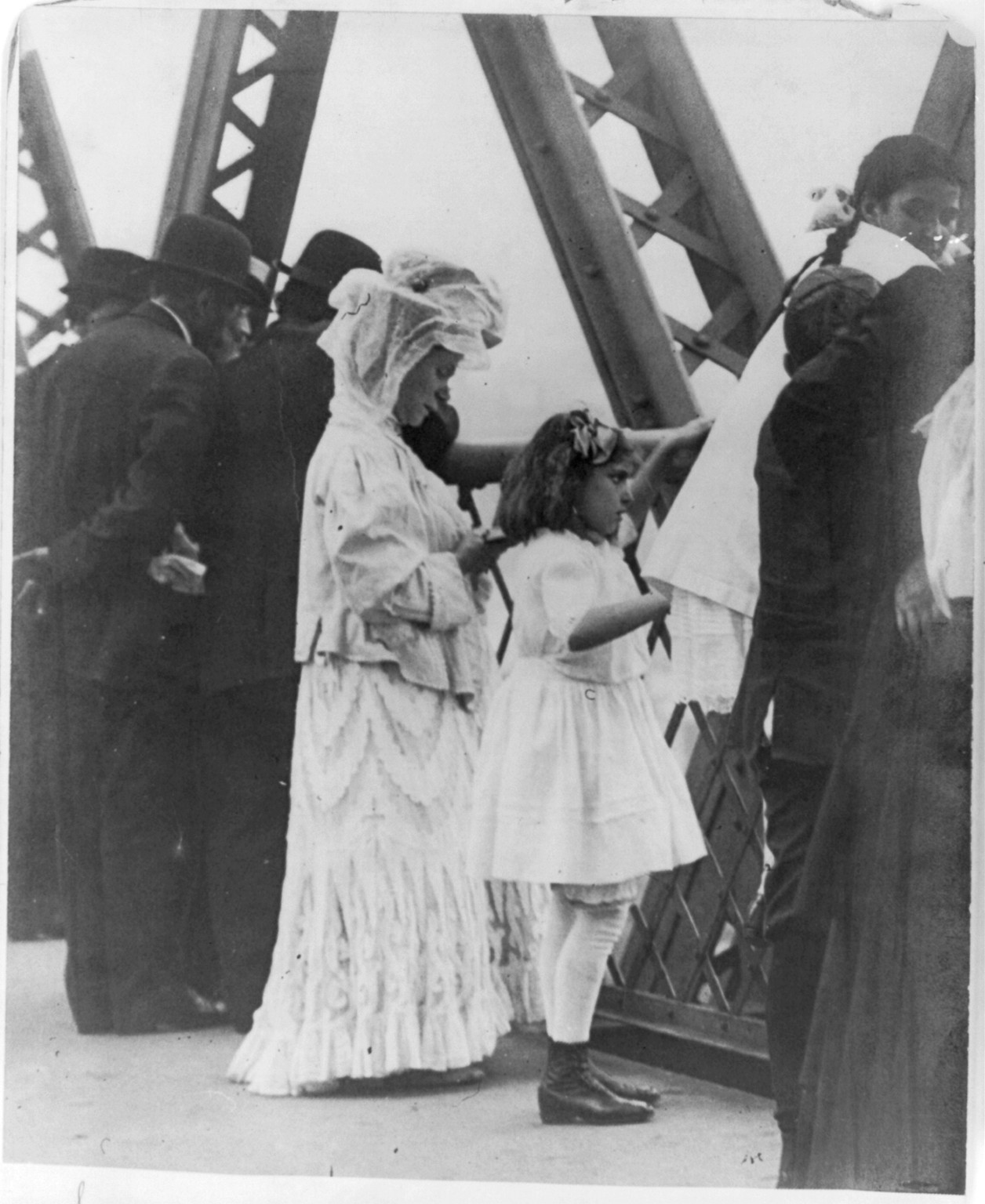
On the Williamsburg Bridge (1909)

=== Rama ===
Rabbi Moses Isserles (Kraków, d. 1572), author of the authoritative Ashkenazi glosses to the Shulchan Aruch, explains:

The deeps of the sea allude to the existence of a single Creator that created the world and that controls the world by, for example, not letting the seas flood the earth. Thus, we go to the sea and reflect upon that on New-Year's Day, the anniversary of Creation. We reflect upon proof of the Creator's creation and of His control, so as to repent of our sins to the Creator, and so he will figuratively "cast our sins into the depths of the sea" (Micah 7:18–20).

== Opposition to the custom ==
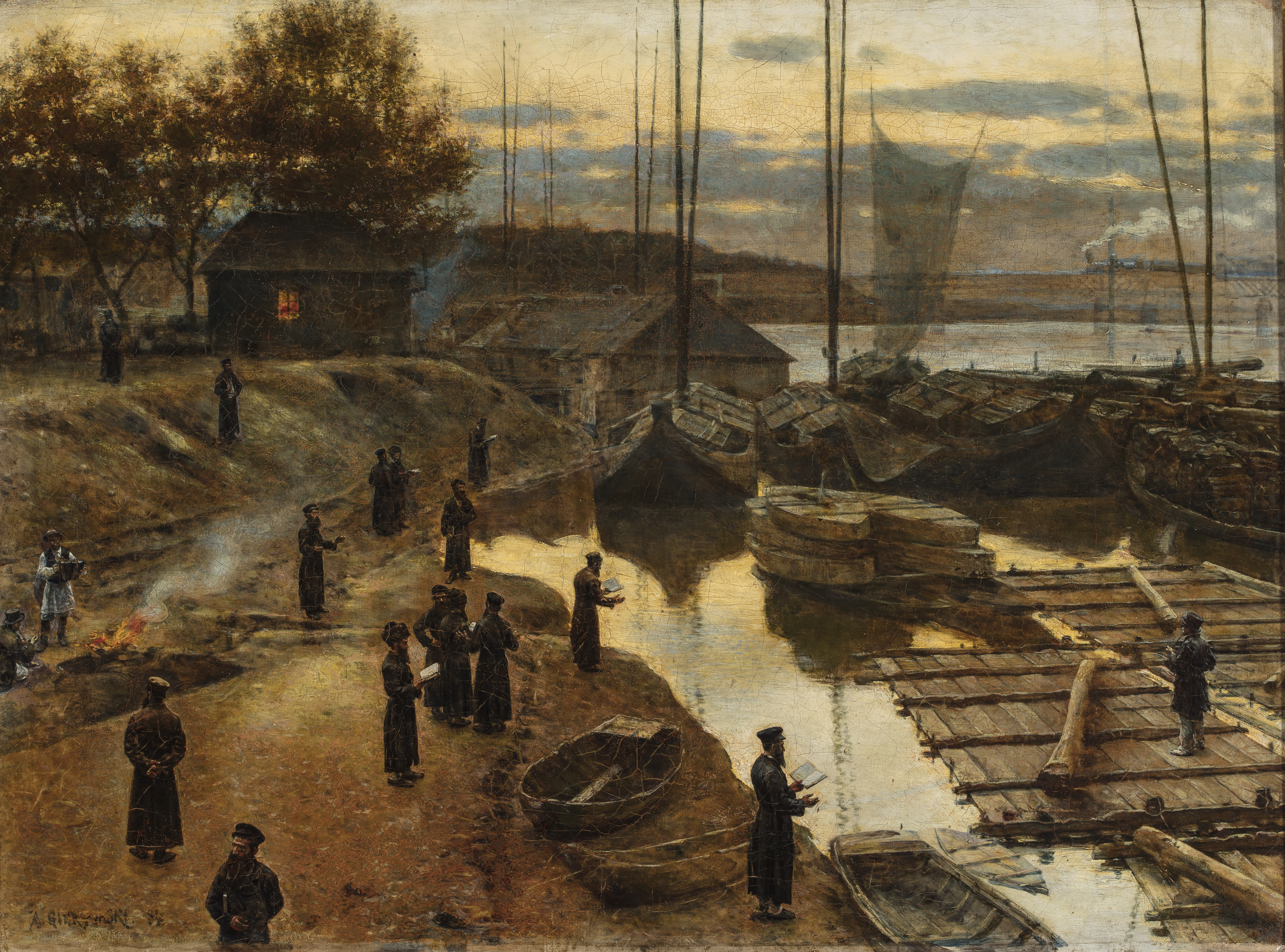
Jews on Rosh Hashanah in Aleksander Gierymski's Święto trąbek I

The Kabbalistic practise of shaking the ends of one's garments at the ceremony, as though casting off the qlippoth, caused many non-kabbalists to denounce the custom. In their view, the custom created the impression among the common people that by literally throwing their sins they might "escape" them without repenting and making amends. The maskilim in particular ridiculed the custom and characterized it as "heathenish". A popular satire from the 1860s was written by Isaac Erter, in which Samael watches the sins of hypocrites dropping into the river.

Shulchan Aruch HaRav states that it is prohibited to feed wild animals on Jewish holidays, and some rabbis say that throwing bread into a body of water with fish on Rosh Hashanah is also prohibited. Shulchan Aruch HaRav also states that it is prohibited to carry unnecessary items in a public domain on Jewish holidays, and some rabbis say that carrying pieces of bread to a body of water would be prohibited on Rosh Hashanah.

The Vilna Gaon also opposed the practice.

== Mainstream acceptance today ==
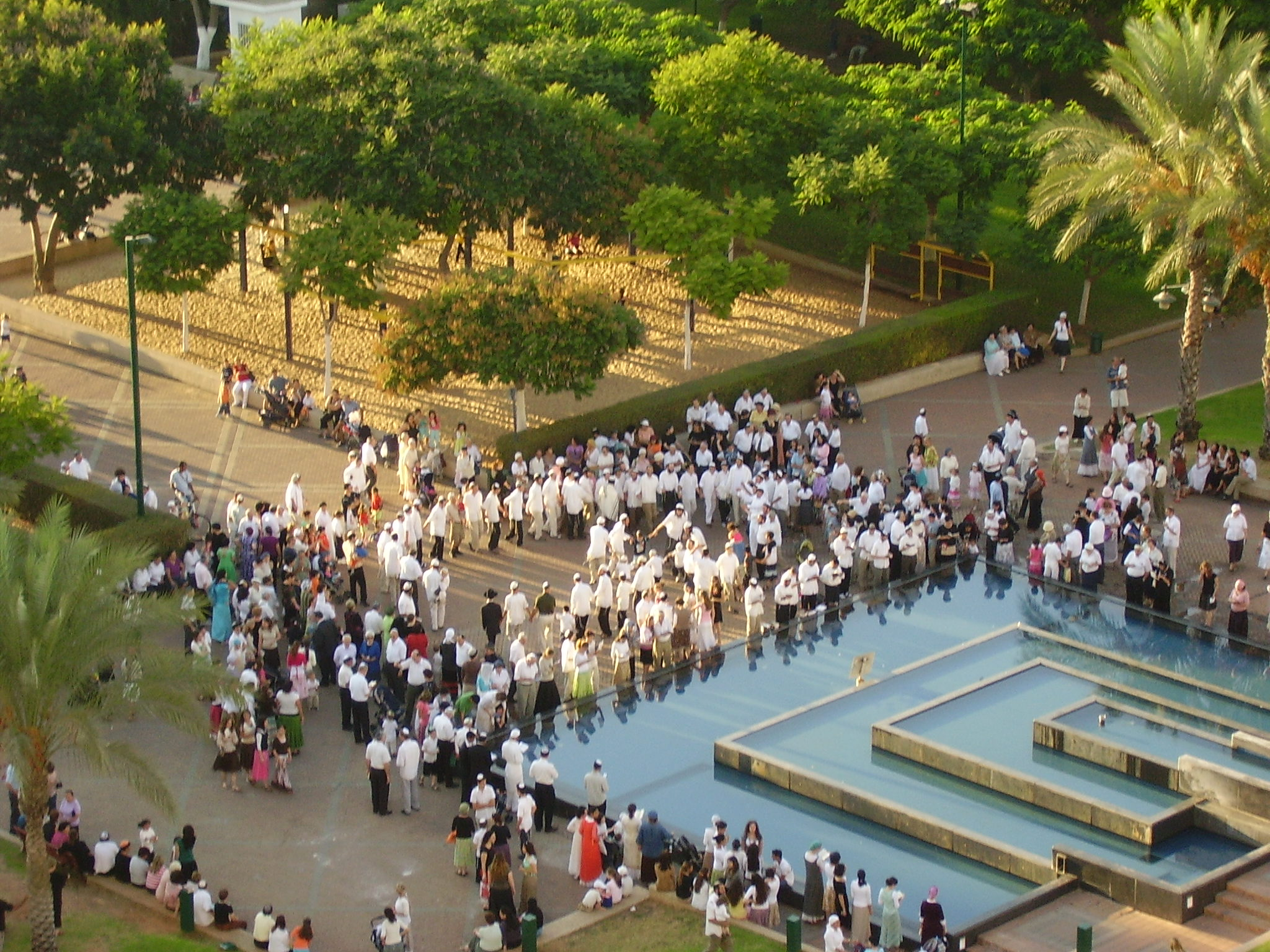
Tashlikh prayer in Ramat Gan, Israel (2006)

Today, most mainstream Jewish religious movements view tashlikh as acceptable. It is generally not practised by Spanish and Portuguese Jews, and it is opposed by the Yemenite Dor Daim movement, and it is not practiced by followers of the Vilna Gaon, mostly in Jerusalem.

Many Jews in New York City perform the ceremony each year in large numbers from the Brooklyn and Manhattan Bridges. In cities with few open bodies of water, such as Jerusalem, people perform the ritual by a fish pond, cistern, or mikveh.

Congregations have different versions of the traditions depending on factors such as location of the synagogue relative to the closest body of water, as well as the branch of Judaism that the group is in. That being said, almost all Jewish congregations participate in some version of Tashlikh each year and the service has adapted to local characteristics in different communities, resulting in various interpretations. In Kurdistan, for instance, Jews choose to jump in the water, and in Galicia, they throw branches into the water. In India, Jews used Tashlikh for matchmaking.

== See also ==
- Repentance in Judaism
- Atonement in Judaism
- Kapparot
- Minhag
