= Lazar Horowitz =

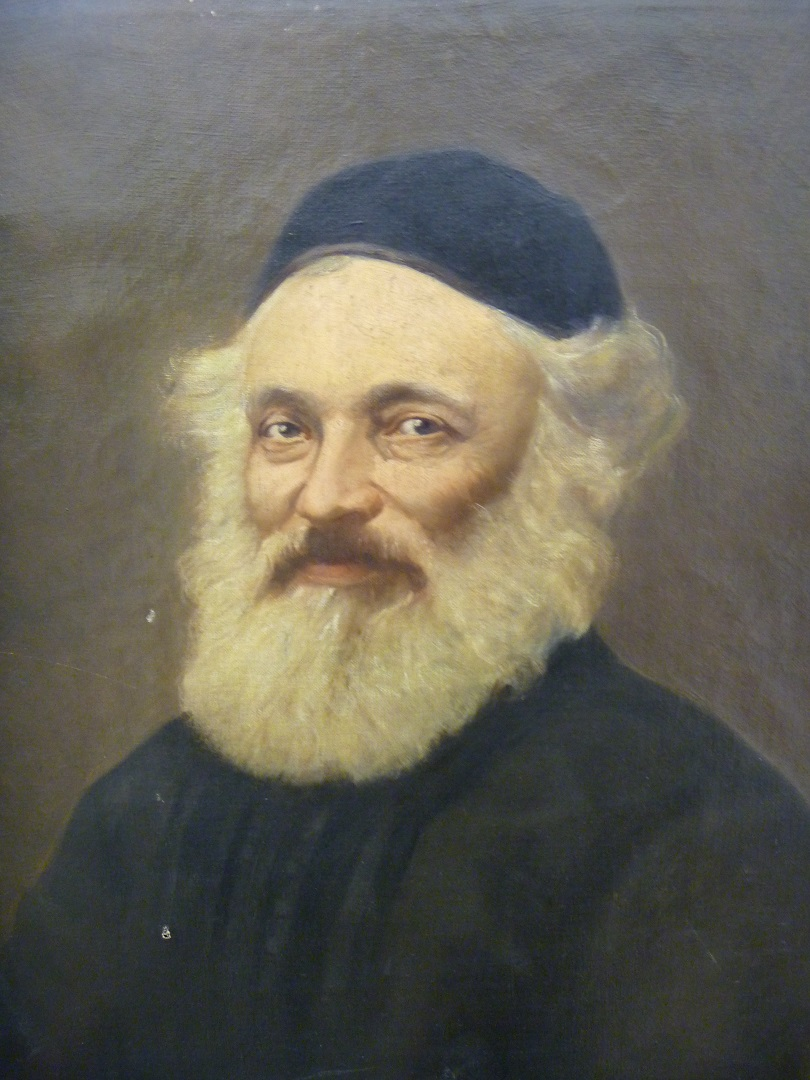

Lazar Horowitz, or Eleazar HaLevi Ish Horowitz, Eleasar ben David Josua Hoeschel Horowitz, a.k.a. El'azar Hurwitz (1803/1804, Floß, Upper Palatinate - June 11, 1868, Vöslau) was an Orthodox Rabbi who led the Jewish community of Vienna during the Vormärz period and became the first Chief Rabbi of the Israelitische Kultusgemeinde Vienna in 1852, while retaining his title and position as Chief Rabbi of Vienna.

As such, Horowitz was the last Chief Rabbi of the Israelitische Kultusgemeinde who was also Chief Rabbi of Vienna.

Born in Bavaria, Horowitz was a student of Moses Sofer of Pressburg before moving to Vienna in 1828 to serve as the community's supervisor of Kosher meat. There, he collaborated with Reform Jewish rabbis of his day, such as Isaak Noah Mannheimer and Adolph Jellinek regarding synagogue protocol in the central synagogues of Vienna. In 1829, he drafted the bylaws of the central Stadttempel. Although he himself was an Orthodox Rabbi, he prayed occasionally in the Stadttempel where Isaac Noah Mannheimer, who tried to introduce reforms, served as its pulpit rabbi.

Horwitz wrote a book of halakhic responsa called "Yad Eleazar."

His responsum regarding metzitzah b'peh was strongly influenced by the Hatam Sofer's rulings, according to Meir Hershkovitz in his 1972 article on Horwitz.

In 1863, Horowitz, along with Isaac Noah Mannheimer, defended Heinrich Graetz, in Viennese court when Graetz was accused of heresy for an article published by Leopold Kompert in a local journal. Graetz had written that the chapters in Isaiah referring to the Messiah were meant to be interpreted non-literally, and that they referred to a national Messiah instead of a personal one. Isaac Hirsch Weiss published a pamphlet entitled Neẓaḥ Yisrael in support of the testimony. On the other hand, rabbis such Azriel Hildesheimer, criticized Horowitz for defending Graetz. See Heinrich Graetz #The Kompert Affair.

== See also ==
- IKG Wien
