= Isaac Noah Mannheimer =

Danish Austrian rabbi and politician

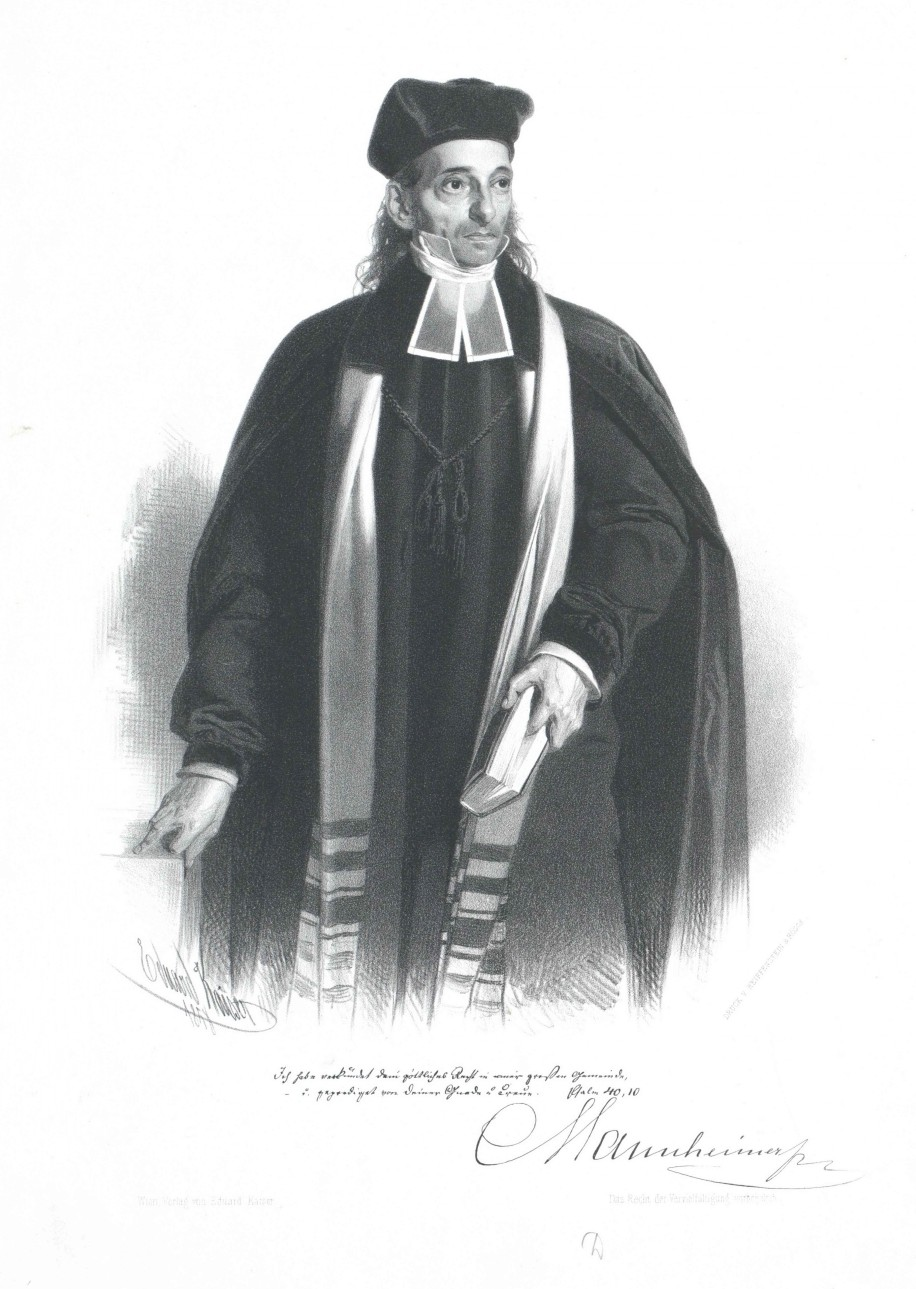
Isaac Noah Mannheimer

Isaac Noah Mannheimer (Yiddish: יצחק נח מאנהיימער; October 17, 1793, Copenhagen – March 17, 1865, Vienna) was a rabbi and member of the House of Deputies.

== Biography ==
The son of a hazzan, he began the study of the Talmud at an early age, though not to the neglect of secular studies. On completing the course of the cathedral school at Copenhagen, he studied philosophy, Oriental languages, and theology in university, while at the same time continuing his studies in Talmud and Judaics. When the Jews of Denmark were emancipated in 1814, confirmation was made obligatory, and the office of Catechist was instituted by the state, Mannheimer being the first incumbent (1816). The first confirmation took place May 1817. In 1821 Mannheimer went to Vienna, where there was then no congregation because the community was divided into two factions, Reform and Orthodox. Mannheimer, who was welcomed by both factions, soon succeeded in organizing a congregation, drafting a program and ritual on the traditional basis and harmonizing the views of the two parties. He returned to Copenhagen in December of the same year. Failing in his attempt to secure a new synagogue for Reform services, he accepted a call to the pulpit left vacant by Zunz in Berlin. German services, however, were interdicted in that city; the temple formerly under the ministry of B. Beer was closed, and the royal cabinet order of 26 December 1823, obtained by the Orthodox party, frustrated the attempt to adapt the old ritual to new forms by delivering German sermons in the chief synagogue. Mannheimer therefore left Berlin and took temporary charge of the pulpit of Hamburg, preaching also at Leipzig during the fairs. In 1824 he married Liseke Damier, and in November of the same year he was called to what was then a new synagogue, the state-supported Stadttempel, in Vienna at the prompting of wealthy Reform businessman, Michael Lazar Biedermann. Because of Austrian law, he could not receive the title of preacher or rabbi; he was inducted, in June 1825, as headmaster of a religious school, or more specifically "Direktor der Wiener K. K. Genehmigten Oeffentlichen Israelitischen Religionsschule"; he dedicated the new synagogue in April 1826, and officiated there until 1829.

Mannheimer was active in trying to improve and recognizing the political status of Jews in Austria. In 1826, he began the practice of recording the births, marriages, and deaths of the Viennese Jewish community; in 1831, he was formally commissioned by the government to maintain these in a central registry. In 1842, he was instrumental in the defeat of a proposal to establish quotas for Jews admitted to the medical school. He was also responsible for the abolition of the Oath More Judaico, an antisemitic, deliberately humiliating "oath" Jews were forced to recite to be accepted as witnesses in court.

Mannheimer's success was due in great measure to his oratorical gifts. His sermons were, for their time, models (Geiger, Einleitung in das Studium der Jüdischen Theologie, in Nachgelassene Schriften, ii. 31). His German translation of the prayerbook and of the fast-day prayers, and his arrangement of the fast-day liturgy, are of permanent importance for the ritual, the conservative spirit in which this work was undertaken leading to its adoption by many communities.

In 1848 Mannheimer was elected Brody to the Austrian Reichsrat, where he delivered two memorable speeches, one on the Jewish tax (5 October 1848) and the other on the abolition of capital punishment (29 January 1849). By 1850, Mannheimer was the official "preacher" of the entire city of Vienna. On his seventieth birthday the city of Vienna conferred honorary citizenship upon him. He devoted the gifts bestowed by the community upon him on that occasion to a foundation for the aid of rabbis, preachers, and teachers, which still bears his name.

In 1863, Mannheimer, along with Lazar Horowitz, defended Heinrich Graetz, in Viennese court when Graetz was accused of heresy for an article published by Leopold Kompert in a local journal. Graetz had written that the chapters in Isaiah referring to the Messiah were meant to be interpreted non-literally, and that they referred to a national Messiah instead of a personal one. Isaac Hirsch Weiss published a pamphlet entitled Neẓaḥ Yisrael in support of the testimony. See Heinrich Graetz #The Kompert Affair.

=== Religious views ===
Mannheimer initially followed Reform Judaism but became more conservative in practice over time. Although he supported the beautification of services, he disagreed with certain Reform practices, such as including the organ to accompany the service; his meshing of both modern and traditional elements of Judaism, such as Hebrew services, circumcision, and prayers for the restoration of Zion, averted a major schism among Austrian Jews between the Reform and Orthodox factions. Along with the hazzan Salomon Sulzer, Mannheimer formed what was known as the Vienna Rite.

Mannheimer was the first Jewish leader in Vienna to introduce a coming-of-age ceremony (confirmation) for girls, prior to the advent of a bat mitzvah.

== Works ==
Mannheimer published the following works: Prædikener Holdte ved det Mosaiske Troes-Samfund's Andagts-Övelser i Modersmaalet i Sommerhalvaaret 1819 (Copenhagen, 1819); Gottesdienstliche Vorträge Gehalten im Israelitischen Bethause zu Wien im Monate Tischri 5594 (Vienna, 1834); Gottesdienstliche Vorträge für die Wochenabschnitte des Jahres, vol. i, Genesis and Exodus (ib. 1835; partly translated into Hebrew by E Kuttner, ib. 1865); a translation of the prayer-book and of the fast-day prayers according to the ritual of the Vienna Temple (1840; frequently reprinted). His polemics and responsa include: Gutachten für das Gebetbuch des Hamburger Tempels (1841); Gutachten Gegen die Reformpartei in Frankfurt-am-Main in Angelegenheit der Beschneidungsfrage (1843); Einige Worte über Juden und Judenthum (supplement to the Oesterreichische Medicinische Wochenschrift, 1842, No. 34), directed against Professor Rosa's statements in reference to the Jewish Question (1848). Two numbers of his Gottesdienstliche Vorträge appeared posthumously, edited by S. Hammerschlag (Vienna, 1876).

== See also ==
- IKG Wien
