= Isaac Erter =

Polish Jewish satirist and poet

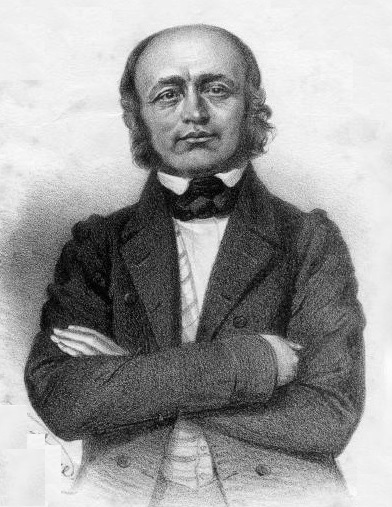
- Born: 1792; Koniuszek, Galicia, Habsburg Empire
- Died: April 1851 (aged 58–59); Brody, Galicia, Austrian Empire
- Occupation: Physician
- Writing career
- Language: Hebrew
- Genre: Satire
- Literary movement: Haskalah

Isaac Erter (Yiddish: יצחק ערטער, Hebrew: יִצְחָק אֶרְטֶר, romanized: Yitsḥak Erter; 1792 – April 1851) was a Polish-Jewish satirist and poet of the Galician Haskalah. His Hebrew prose has been compared to that of writers Heinrich Heine and Ludwig Börne.

== Biography ==
Isaac Erter was born into the family of a poor Jewish innkeeper in the Galician town of Koniuszek, near Przemyśl. At the age of 13, his father arranged for him to marry a rabbi's daughter, who, however, died within the first year after her marriage. A second marriage followed soon after, and Erter went to live with his father-in-law in Wielkie Oczy. There he was introduced to Jewish philosophy and Hebrew literature by maskil Yosef Tarler.

Erter began associating with the Ḥasidic movement, but after a time abandoned it and settled in Lemberg in 1813. In that city he joined the maskilic circles of Solomon Löb Rapoport, Nachman Krochmal, Judah Löb Mieses, and others. Through the efforts of some of his friends, he obtained pupils whom he instructed in Hebrew language and other subjects. This comparatively happy state ended after three years, when, on 10 May 1816, Chief Rabbi Jacob Meshullam Ornstein excommunicated the city's most prominent maskilim. Deprived thus of his pupils, the only means of his subsistence, he settled in the neighbouring town of Brody, where he encountered Hirsch Mendel Pineles, Jacob Bick, and Isaac Baer Levinsohn. When in 1823 a new Jewish school was inaugurated there, he was entrusted with its management.

After a short time, he resigned his position, and made up his mind to prepare himself for a career in medicine. Erter studied at the University of Budapest from 1825 to 1829, and passed all the prescribed examinations. He afterwards practised his new profession in various Galician towns amid the cholera pandemic, eventually returning to Brody, where he made himself especially popular among the poor and needy. In public affairs, Erter founded the Galizisch-jüdischer Akerbauverein, which advocated for the establishment in Galicia of agricultural colonies for the employment and benefit of young Jews.

The last years of his life were again visited by various hard trials, chiefly caused by the untimely death of his two married daughters. He did not survive them long, and died during the Passover of 1851.

== Work ==
Erter devoted his leisure time to the composition of essays and satires on Jewish subjects, which were published from 1823 until his death. These he usually sent to his literary friends, to be read and criticised, before allowing them to be printed in the Hebrew periodicals.

His collected works were published posthumously under the title Ha-tzofeh le-veit Yisrael ('A Watchman unto the House of Israel'; Vienna, 1858), with a biography of the author and introduction by Max Letteris. The book includes the stories Mozne mishkal ('Weighing Scale', 1823), Ha-tzofeh be-shubo mi-Karlsbad ('The Watchman on His Return from Carlsbad'), Gilgul ha-nefesh ('Transmigration of the Soul, 1845), Tashlikh (1840), Telunat Sani ve-Sansani ve-Samangaluf ('The Complaints of Sani and Sansani and Samangaluf', 1837), and Ḥasidut ve-ḥokmah ('Piety and Wisdom', 1834).

His most popular satire is Gilgul ha-nefesh, the humorous story of the many adventures of a soul during a long earthly career; how it frequently passed from one body into another, and how it had once left the body of an ass for that of a physician. The soul gives the author the following six rules, by observing which he might succeed in his profession:

1. "Powder your hair white, and keep on the table of your study a human skull and some animal skeletons. Those coming to you for medical advice will then think your hair has turned white through constant study and overwork in your profession.
2. Fill your library with large books, richly bound in red and gold. Though you never even open them people will be impressed with your wisdom.
3. Sell or pawn everything, if that is necessary, to have a carriage of your own.
4. When called to a patient pay less attention to him than to those about him. On leaving the sick-room, assume a grave face, and pronounce the case a most critical one. Should the patient die, you will be understood to have hinted at his death; if, on the other hand, he recovers, his relations and friends will naturally attribute his recovery to your skill.
5. Have as little as possible to do with the poor; as they will only send for you in hopeless and desperate cases you will gain neither honor nor reward by attending them. Let them wait outside your house, that passers may be amazed at the crowd waiting patiently to obtain your services.
6. Consider every medical practitioner as your natural enemy, and speak of him always with the utmost disparagement. If he be young, you must say he has not had sufficient experience; if he be old, you must declare that his eyesight is bad, or that he is more or less crazy, and not to be trusted in important cases. When you take part in a consultation with other physicians, you would act wisely by protesting loudly against the previous treatment of the case by your colleagues. Whatever the issue may be, you will always be on the safe side."

The story was later translated into Yiddish by Isaac Mayer Dick.

Erter was involved in the founding of the Hebrew periodical He-Ḥalutz, which was intended chiefly to develop the Hebrew language, and to promote culture and enlightenment among the Galician Jews. He died one year before the first volume appeared. He also wrote some Hebrew verse; but this won little acclaim compared to his prose.
