= Leopold Kompert =

Bohemian Jewish writer (1822-1886)

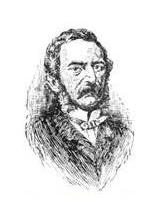
Leopold Kompert, his portrait in the Jewish Encyclopedia

Leopold Kompert (15 May 1822 – 23 November 1886) was a Bohemian Jewish writer. He was born in Mnichovo Hradiště (German: Münchengrätz), Bohemia, and died in Vienna, Austria.

He studied at the universities of Prague and Vienna, and was for several years tutor in the house of Count George Andrassy. In 1857 he entered the service of the Vienna Creditanstalt. As a member of the Vienna city council Kompert displayed a useful activity in the interest of education, and likewise, as a member of the board of the Jewish congregation, in the promotion of religious instruction. He took an active part also in the Israelitische Allianz of Vienna. As vice-president of the Israelitischer Waisenverein he devoted considerable attention to the education of orphans, and used his influence in the foundation of Baron Todesco's institution for the benefit of orphans who had left the asylum. He also held for many years honorary offices in the Schillerverein.

Kompert began his literary activity in the Pressburger Zeitung. From 1848 to 1852 he was editor of the Österreichischer Lloyd. As creator of ghetto literature he was called The Auerbach of the ghetto. His stories depicting the life, customs, and manners of the Bohemian Jews have become classical and have found many imitators. He draws the transition from the life in the narrow ghetto to the farmer's life in the open field; and he shows the struggles, doubts, and misgivings of those who, yielding to the impulse of modern times, undergo the changes of their newly chosen career. Seeing that under the leveling influence of the present day the characteristic inner Jewish life is threatened to vanish, he endeavors to preserve its originality, its deeper psychological, sentimental, and ethical spirit, for the knowledge of posterity.

Kompert's first story, Der Schnorrer, appeared in 1846 in Ludwig August Frankl's Sonntagsblatt, No. 7. Then followed

Geschichten aus dem Ghetto, Leipzig, 1848;
Böhmische Juden, Vienna, 1851;
Am Pfluge, Berlin, 1855;
Neue Geschichten aus dem Ghetto, Prague, 1860;
Geschichten einer Gasse, Berlin, 1865;
Zwischen Ruinen, ib. 1873;
Franzi und Heini, eine Wiener Geschichte, ib. 1880;
Verstreute Geschichten, ib. 1883.

In Franzi und Heini, a picture of Vienna society, the Jewish peddler Perl Blüthenstern plays an important part. Some of these stories were first published in Wertheimer's Jahrbuch für Israeliten. A complete edition of Kompert's works in eight volumes appeared in Berlin, 1882–83, and a new edition in Leipzig, 1887.

In 1863, Kompert published an article by Heinrich Graetz in which Graetz interpreted Isaiah chapters 52 and 53 to refer not to the personal Messiah, but rather to the entire people Israel. Graetz and Kompert were brought to court in Vienna for publishing ideas that were heretical to Catholic faith, in addition to contradicting Jewish tradition. Viennese rabbis Isaak Noah Mannheimer and Lazar Horowitz defended Graetz, and Azriel Hildesheimer criticized them for doing so. This case, known as the "Kompert Affair," was an important date in defining the wedge between Orthodox Judaism and the nascent Conservative Judaism championed by the likes of Graetz and Zecharias Frankel. See Heinrich Graetz #The Kompert Affair.

== Works ==
- 1848 - Aus dem Ghetto (Erzählungen)
- 1851 - Böhmische Juden (Erzählungen)
- 1855 - Am Pflug (Roman)
- 1860 - Neue Geschichten aus dem Ghetto (Erzählungen)
- 1865 - Geschichten einer Gasse
- 1875 - Zwischen Ruinen (Roman)
- 1881 - Franzi und Heini (Roman)
- Der Dorfgeher
- Die Jahrzeit
- Die Schwärmerin
- Eisik's Brille
- Gottes Annehmerin
- Judith die Zweite
- Ohne Bewilligung
- Leseprobe aus Die Kinder des Randars
