= Simhah Reuben Edelmann =

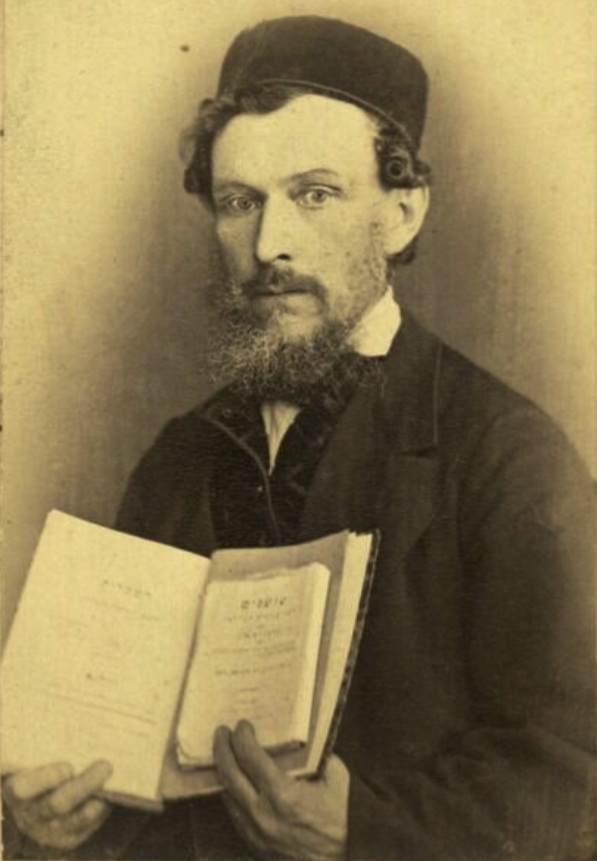
- Born: January 1821; Vilna, Vilna Governorate, Russian Empire
- Died: December 1892 (aged 71); Warsaw, Congress Poland
- Writing career
- Pen name: Sar-Shalom ha-Adulami

Simhah Reuben Edelmann (Hebrew: שמחה ראובן עדלמן; January 1821 – December 1892), also known by the pen name Sar-Shalom ha-Adulami, was a Russian writer, grammarian, and rabbinic commentator.

Edelmann received a Talmudical education at home and later at the yeshivah of Volozhin. He lived in Rossein for about thirty years, mainly in the employ of a rich merchant of the name of Gabrilovitch, but for a part of the time in business for himself. Edelmann was the first to discover the latent talent of the poet Judah Loeb Gordon, for whom he obtained a position as teacher in Gabrilovitch's house. After the death of his wife Edelmann left Rossein and lived for a short time in Tels (1867). Later he was employed successively in Mohilev and Königsberg. In his later days he was again in business for himself, first in Brest and then in Kovno, and at last settled in Warsaw, the home of his surviving children, where he died.

Edelmann was the author of the following works: Shoshannim, containing, besides some treatises on grammar and exegesis, a few poems, and a commentary on Canticles, Königsberg, 1860; Ha-Mesillot, in three parts, of which the first treats of the Masoretic Text of the Bible and of the changed readings occurring in the Bible quotations of the Talmud;the second is a quasi-critical commentary on Psalms lxviii., xc., and c., and the third contains commentaries and explanations on various difficult passages of the Aggadah, Wilna, 1875; Ha-Tirosh, a commentary on Midrash Rabbah, part 1, Genesis, Warsaw, 1891; and Doresh Reshumot (a scathing criticism of the liberal views advanced by Weiss in Dor), ib. 1892. He also contributed valuable articles to Fuenn's Ha-Karmel and Atlas' Ha-Kerem.

Edelmann was considered one of the foremost champions of Orthodoxy in contemporary Hebrew literature.
