= HeHalutz (magazine) =

European Hebrew magazine (1852–1889)

HeḤalutz
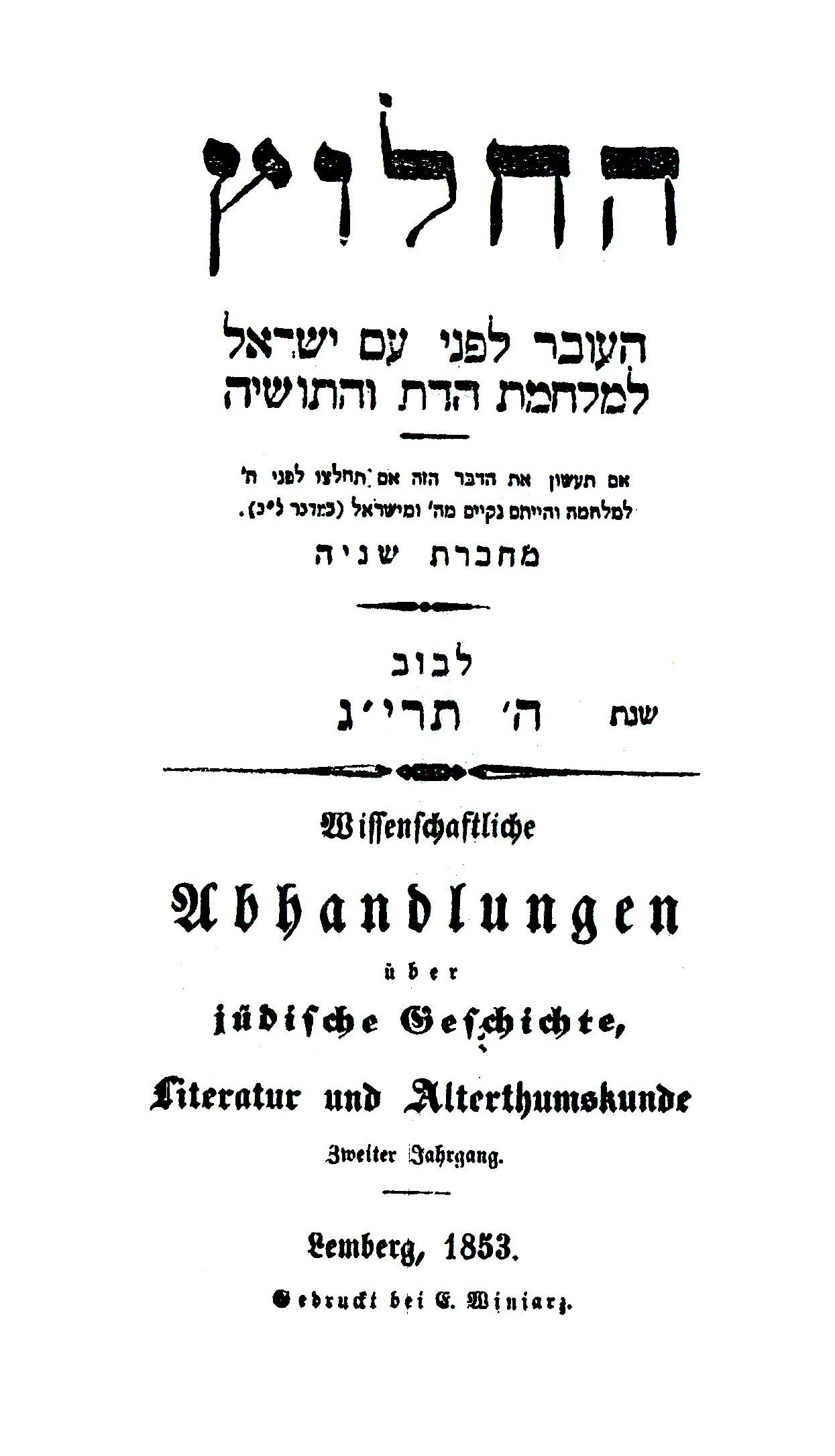
- Editor: Joshua Heschel Schorr
- Founded: 1852
- Ceased publication: 1889
- Language: Hebrew
- City: Lemberg (1852–56); Breslau (1859–61); Frankfurt (1865–69); Prague (1873–80); Vienna (1887–89)
- Free online archives: Online editions at HathiTrust

HeḤalutz (Hebrew: הֶחָלוּץ, lit. 'The Pioneer'; German: Wissenschaftliche Abhandlungen über Jüdische Geschichte, Literatur, und Alterthumskunde, lit. 'Scientific Treatises on Jewish History, Literature, and Antiquities') was a Hebrew magazine which appeared irregularly between 1852 and 1889. It was edited and published by Joshua Heschel Schorr as the realization of a plan mapped out by his friend and teacher Isaac Erter, who had died one year before the first volume appeared.

Abraham Geiger, Abraham Krochmal, Isaac Samuel Reggio, Mordecai Dubs, and Moritz Steinschneider were among the contributors to the earlier volumes, the major portion of which, however, was written by the editor. The articles in the later volumes were written by Schorr exclusively.

HeḤalutz was the most radical of maskilic periodical publications, and Schorr's attacks on the great rabbinical authorities, and even on the Talmud, aroused intense opposition. Entire works, like Moshe Aryeh Leib Harmolin's Ha-Ḥoletz (Lemberg, 1861) and Meir Kohn Bistritz's Bi'ur tit ha-yavan (Presburg, 1888), were written to refute its statements.
