= Asher Simcha Weissmann =

Austrian Hebraist, rabbi, writer and editor

- Born: 21 April 1840; Zolin, Galicia, Austrian Empire
- Died: 14 May 1892 (aged 52); Vienna, Austria-Hungary
- Writing career
- Pen name: A. Ezraḥ
- Language: Hebrew, Yiddish, German

Asher Simcha Weissmann (Yiddish: אשר שמחה ווייסמאן, romanized: Osher Simkhe Vaysman; 21 April 1840 – 14 May 1892) was an Austrian Hebraist, rabbi, writer, and editor.

== Biography ==
Asher Simcha Weissmann was born into a Jewish family in Zolin, Galicia. He received rabbinical training in his native town and in the yeshiva of Rzeszów, whereupon he took up in 1871 the study of foreign languages and natural sciences. After officiating for some time as director of the Jewish school of Galați, Romania, he went to Tysmenitz, Galicia, and finally settled in Vienna.

Weissmann's literary activity in Hebrew and German was considerable. In 1872 he founded the Yidishe fraye prese, a Yiddish monthly with a Hebrew supplement entitled Ha-Kohelet, but only three numbers of it appeared. He contributed essays and novels to various Hebrew and Yiddish periodicals, including Ha-Mabit, Ha-Magid, Ha-Mevaser, Ha-Nesher, Ha-Ivri, Haboker or, Der izraelit, Israelitische Wochenschrift, and the Literatur-blatt, among others. Especially noteworthy were his novels Ha-Neder (in Ha-Mabit 15, 1878), treating of the moral status of the Jews; Chaim Prostak (in Moritz Rahmer's Wochenschrift, 1880), dealing with Jewish life in Galicia; and Folgen Verfehlter Erziehung (in the Israelit). His Chaim Prostak was later translated into German and English.

In 1889 Weissmann founded in Vienna a German periodical, Monatsschrift für Litteratur und Wissenschaft des Judenthums, which was issued with a Hebrew supplement. To this publication, which existed for two years, he contributed numerous articles, including essays on the redaction of the Psalms, and critical essays on the books of Esther and of Judith, the last-named being reprinted in book form. In the Hebrew supplement Weissmann published a work on the history of the formation of Jewish sects prior to the death of Simeon the Just. He was the author also of Kontras al devar serefat ha-metim"(Lemberg, 1878), a critical essay on cremation according to the Tanakh and Talmud, and Kedushat ha-Tanakh (Vienna, 1887), on the canonization of the books of the Tanakh. In 1891 he published at Vienna Jonathan Eybeschütz's Shem Olam, according to a manuscript from the library of Adolf Jellinek, together with notes of his own and an introduction by S. Rubin.

He died of hunger in Vienna in 1892.
