= Ashkenazi Jews =

Jewish diaspora of Central Europe

אַשְׁכְּנַזִּים (Ashkenazim)
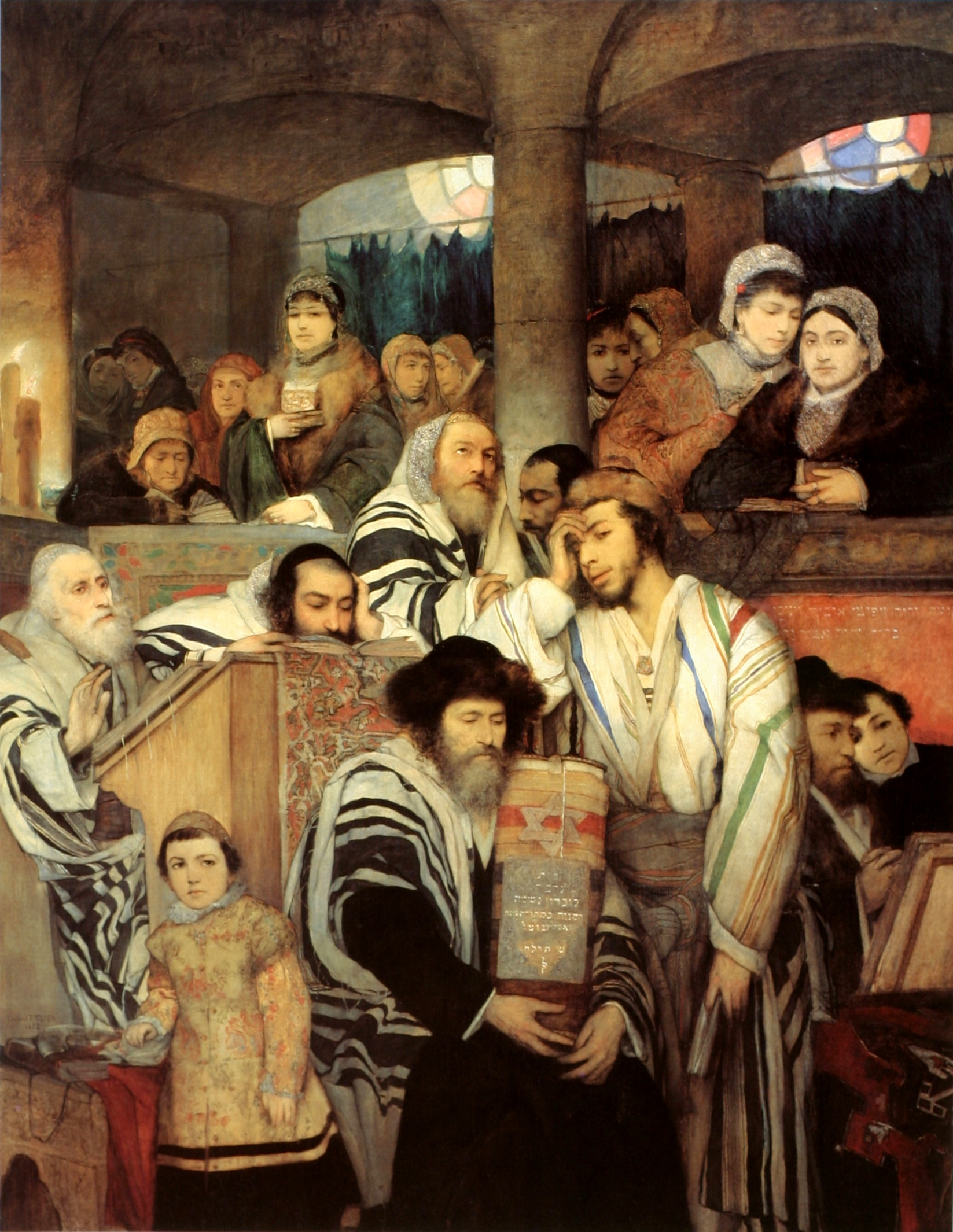
- Jews Praying in the Synagogue on Yom Kippur (1878)

Total population
- 10–13 million (est.)

Regions with significant populations
- See: Population by country

Languages
- Hebrew; English; Russian; German; French; Ukrainian; Yiddish; other European languages

Religion
- Judaism, Jewish secularism (including Jewish atheism)

Related ethnic groups
- Sephardi Jews, Mizrahi Jews, other Jewish ethnic divisions and Samaritans; various Middle Eastern and European ethnic groups

Ashkenazi Jews, (Note: Pronunciation of "Ashkenazi": /ˌɑːʃkəˈnɑːzi, ˌæʃ-/, A(H)SH-kə-NAH-zee) also known as Ashkenazic Jews, Ashkenazis, or Ashkenazim, (Note: Pronunciation: /ˌɑːʃkəˈnɑːzɪm, ˌæʃ-/, AHSH-kə-NAH-zim, ASH-; Hebrew: אַשְׁכְּנַזִּים Ashkenazi Hebrew pronunciation: [ˌaʃkəˈnazɪm] Singular: [ˌaʃkəˈnazi] Modern Hebrew: [(ʔ)aʃkenaˈzim, (ʔ)aʃkenaˈzi]) are a distinct ethnic subdivision of the Jewish diaspora. The Ashkenazim emerged from the Jewish communities that consolidated during the 10th century in the Rhineland (western Germany) and in northern France, having migrated there from centers such as the Italian Peninsula and the Southern Levant. After numerous massacres of Jews during the Crusades (11th–13th centuries), they began a gradual eastward migration due to mounting restrictions within the Holy Roman Empire and the favorable policies of Casimir III the Great of Poland and others. This migration ramped up after the persecution of Jews during the Black Death during the 14th century, such that by the 16th century, the bulk of the Ashkenazi Jews had migrated to the Kingdom of Poland, which includes modern Poland, Lithuania, Belarus, Ukraine, and parts of Russia. This area became the main center of Ashkenazi Jewry until the Holocaust. (Note: Attributed to multiple references:)

Ashkenazim adapted their traditions, rites and customs to Europe. They traditionally follow the German rite synagogue ritual and until the Holocaust primarily spoke Yiddish, an offshoot of Middle High German written in a variety of the Hebrew script, with significant Hebrew, Aramaic, and Slavic influence. From the late 18th century onwards, Ashkenazi communities underwent significant religious and cultural transformations, under the influence of the Haskalah (Jewish Enlightenment) and the struggle for Jewish emancipation in European states that restricted their rights. Among other things, Maskilim (adherents of the Haskalah) advocated the adoption of national languages instead of Yiddish, as well as increased study and usage of the Hebrew language, in order to modernize Jewish religious practice and identity. The Hebrew language, whose usage until then had been primarily liturgical and clerical, was progressively revived as a common language starting from the 19th century, fueled by these aspirations of both religious and national revival. The Yiddish language progressively declined in prestige, in favor of national languages and Hebrew, being stigmatized by both assimilationists and Zionists, though it remained spoken by over 11 million people worldwide prior to the Holocaust. The Yiddishist movement, which sought to preserve and revive the language, faded through the 20th century but is enjoying a revival in the 21st.

Starting from the 19th century, millions of Ashkenazi Jews emigrated from Europe, fleeing an increase in violent anti-Jewish bigotry that occurred, in part, as a reactionary response to Jewish emancipation. Ashkenazi Jews emigrated both to Ottoman Palestine, as part of the "Aliyah" movement, and to the United States, which today houses the largest Ashkenazi community in the world.

Throughout the centuries, Ashkenazim made significant contributions to Western philosophy, scholarship, literature, art, music, and science. As a proportion of the world Jewish population, Ashkenazim were estimated to be 3% in the 11th century, rising to 92% in 1930 near the population's peak. The Ashkenazi population was significantly diminished by the Holocaust carried out by Nazi Germany during World War II, which killed around six million Jews, affecting practically every European Jewish family. Prior to World War II, the estimated worldwide Jewish population was 15.3–16.7 million, with 92% being Ashkenazi. Israeli demographer Sergio D. Pergola published statistics showing that Ashkenazim comprised 74% of Jews worldwide in 2000. As of 2023, the population of Ashkenazim was estimated to be around 10–13 million out of 15.8 million total Jews.

== Etymology ==
The name Ashkenazi derives from the biblical figure of Ashkenaz, the first son of Gomer, son of Japhet, son of Noah, and a Japhetic patriarch in the Table of Nations. The name of Gomer has often been linked to the Cimmerians.

The Biblical Ashkenaz is usually derived from Assyrian Aškūza (cuneiform Aškuzai/Iškuzai), a people who expelled the Cimmerians from the Armenian area of the Upper Euphrates; the name Aškūza is identified with the Scythians.

In Jeremiah 51:27, Ashkenaz figures as one of three kingdoms in the far north, the others being Minni and Ararat (corresponding to Urartu), called on by God to resist Babylon. In Genesis Rabbah, Rabbi Berekhiah (early 4th century) mentions Ashkenaz, Riphath, and Togarmah as German tribes or as German lands. Ashkenaz is linked to Scandza/Scanzia, viewed as the cradle of Germanic tribes, in a 6th-century gloss to the Historia Ecclesiastica of Eusebius.

In the 10th-century History of Armenia of Yovhannes Drasxanakertc'i (1.15), Ashkenaz was associated with Armenia, as it was occasionally in Jewish usage, where its denotation extended at times to Adiabene, Khazaria, Crimea and areas to the east. His contemporary Saadia Gaon identified Ashkenaz with the slavim or Slavs. In 1932, Samuel Krauss identified the Biblical "Ashkenaz" with northern Asia Minor and specifically with the Khazars, an argument disputed by his contemporary Jacob Mann.

Conforming to the custom of designating areas of Jewish settlement with biblical names, Spain was denominated Sefarad (Obadiah 20), France was called Tsarefat (1 Kings 17:9), and Bohemia was called the Land of Canaan. By the start of the high medieval period, Hai Gaon refers to questions that had been addressed to him from Ashkenaz, by which he undoubtedly means Germany, and Talmudic commentators like Rashi began to use Ashkenaz/Eretz Ashkenaz to designate Germany, earlier known as Loter, where, especially in the Rhineland communities of Speyer, Worms and Mainz, the most important Jewish communities arose. Rashi uses leshon Ashkenaz (Ashkenazi language) to describe German expressions, and Byzantium and Syrian Jewish letters referred to the Crusaders as Ashkenazim. During the 12th century, the word appears quite frequently. In the Mahzor Vitry, the kingdom of Ashkenaz is referred to chiefly in regard to the ritual of the synagogue there, but occasionally also with regard to certain other observances. In the literature of the 13th century, references to the land and the language of Ashkenaz often occur. Examples include Solomon ben Aderet's Responsa (vol. i., No. 395); the Responsa of Asher ben Jehiel (pp. 4, 6); his Halakot (Berakot i. 12, ed. Wilna, p. 10); the work of his son Jacob ben Asher, Tur Orach Chayim (chapter 59); the Responsa of Isaac ben Sheshet (numbers 193, 268, 270). Given the close links between the Jewish communities of France and Germany following the Carolingian unification, the term Ashkenazi came to refer to the Jews of both medieval Germany and France.

In later times, the word Ashkenaz is used to designate southern and western Germany, the ritual of which sections differs somewhat from that of eastern Germany and Poland. Thus the prayer-book of Isaiah Horowitz, and many others, give the piyyutim according to the Minhag of Ashkenaz and Poland.

== Definition ==
There have been several different understandings of what "Ashkenazi" means. For the Rabbinical scholar Joseph Karo it was a geographical term, simply referring to Jews residing in Germany. For rabbis Isaac Luria, Elijah Levita, Moses Isserles and Jacob Castro, it was a genealogical term, referring to descendents of medieval French and German communities, wherever they dwelt. For Ottoman rabbis such as David ben Hayyim of Corfu or Samuel de Medina, it referred to membership in specific Ashkenazi congregations. For the rabbi Jacob Heilbronn, it refers to those who follow the liturgical and legal practices codified in the German and central European lands. For the rabbi Joshua Falk and later the linguist Max Weinreich, it refers to speakers of Judeo-German languages such as Yiddish. More recently, it has been associated with particular genetic traits.

=== By religion ===
In a religious sense, an Ashkenazi Jew is any Jew whose family tradition and synagogue ritual follow Ashkenazi ritual customs and traditions (minhag), including interpretations of Jewish religious law (see Halakha) and order of prayers. Until the Ashkenazi community first began to develop in the Early Middle Ages, the centers of Jewish religious authority were in the Islamic world, at Baghdad and in Islamic Spain. Ashkenaz (Germany) was so distant geographically that it developed a minhag of its own. Ashkenazi Hebrew came to be pronounced in ways that were distinct from other forms of Hebrew.

In this respect, one counterpart of Ashkenazi is Sephardic, since a majority of non-Ashkenazi Orthodox Jews follow Sephardic rabbinical authorities, whether or not they are ethnically Sephardic. (Regardless, other traditions do exist: Yemenite Jews, Ethiopian Jews, Greek Jews, and other communities have and maintain their distinct minhagim). By tradition, a Sephardic or Mizrahi woman who marries into an Orthodox or Haredi Ashkenazi Jewish family raises her children to be Ashkenazi Jews. Conversely, an Ashkenazi woman who marries a Sephardi or Mizrahi man is expected to take on Sephardic practice and the children inherit a Sephardic identity, though in practice many families compromise. A convert generally follows the practice of the beth din that converted him or her. With the integration of Jews from around the world in Israel, North America, and other places, the religious definition of an Ashkenazi Jew is blurring, especially outside Orthodox Judaism.

New developments in Judaism often transcend differences in religious practice between Ashkenazi and Sephardic Jews. In North American cities, social trends such as the chavurah movement, and the emergence of "post-denominational Judaism" often bring together younger Jews of diverse ethnic backgrounds. In recent years, there has been increased interest in Kabbalah, which many Ashkenazi Jews study outside of the Yeshiva framework. Another trend is the new popularity of ecstatic worship in the Jewish Renewal movement and the Carlebach style minyan, both of which are nominally of Ashkenazi origin. Outside of Haredi communities, the traditional Ashkenazi pronunciation of Hebrew has also drastically declined in favor of the Sephardi-based pronunciation of Modern Hebrew.

=== By culture ===
Culturally, an Ashkenazi Jew can be identified by the concept of Yiddishkeit, which means "Jewishness" in the Yiddish language. Before the Haskalah and the emancipation of Jews in Europe, this meant the study of Torah and Talmud for men, and a family and communal life governed by the observance of Jewish Law for men and women. From the Rhineland to Riga to Romania, most Jews prayed in liturgical Ashkenazi Hebrew, and spoke Yiddish in their secular lives. But with modernization, Yiddishkeit now encompasses not just Orthodoxy and Hasidism, but a broad range of movements, ideologies, practices, and traditions in which Ashkenazi Jews have participated and somehow retained a sense of Jewishness. Although a far smaller number of Jews still speak Yiddish, Yiddishkeit can be identified in manners of speech, in styles of humor, in patterns of association.

As Ashkenazi Jews moved away from Europe, mostly in the form of aliyah to Israel, or immigration to North America, South Africa, Europe (particularly France) and Latin America, the geographic isolation that gave rise to Ashkenazim have given way to mixing with other cultures, and with non-Ashkenazi Jews who, similarly, are no longer isolated in distinct geographic locales. Hebrew has replaced Yiddish as the primary Jewish language for many Ashkenazi Jews, although many Hasidic and Hareidi groups continue to use Yiddish in daily life.

France's blended Jewish community is typical of the cultural recombination that is going on among Jews throughout the world. Although France expelled its original Jewish population in the Middle Ages, by the time of the French Revolution, there were two distinct Jewish populations. One consisted of Sephardic Jews, originally refugees from the Inquisition and concentrated in the southwest, while the other community was Ashkenazi, concentrated in formerly German Alsace, and mainly speaking a German dialect similar to Yiddish. (The third community of Provençal Jews living in Comtat Venaissin were technically outside France, and were later absorbed into the Sephardim.) The two communities were so separate and different that the National Assembly emancipated them separately in 1790 and 1791.

But after emancipation, a sense of a unified French Jewry emerged, especially when France was wracked by the Dreyfus affair in the 1890s. In the 1920s and 1930s, Ashkenazi Jews from Europe arrived in large numbers as refugees from antisemitism, the Russian revolution, and the economic turmoil of the Great Depression. By the 1930s, Paris had a vibrant Yiddish culture, and many Jews were involved in diverse political movements. After the Vichy years and the Holocaust, the French Jewish population was augmented once again, first by Ashkenazi refugees from Central Europe, and later by Sephardi immigrants and refugees from North Africa, many of them francophone.

Ashkenazi Jews passed down certain musicial traditions orally from one generation to the next. The desire to maintain pre-Holocaust traditions relating to Ashkenazi culture has often been met with criticism by Jews in Eastern Europe. Reasoning for this could be related to the development of a new style of Jewish arts and culture developed by the Jews of Palestine during the 1930s and 1940s, which in conjunction with the decimation of European Ashkenazi Jews and their culture by the Nazi regime made it easier to assimilate to the new style of ritual rather than try to repair the older traditions. This new style of tradition was referred to as the Mediterranean Style, and was noted for its simplicity and metaphorical rejuvenation of Jews abroad. This was intended to replace the Galut (lit. 'exile') traditions, which were more sorrowful in practice.

Then, in the 1990s, yet another Ashkenazi Jewish wave began to arrive to France from countries of the former Soviet Union and Central Europe. The result is a pluralistic Jewish community that still has some distinct elements of both Ashkenazi and Sephardic culture. But in France, it is becoming much more difficult to sort out the two, and a distinctly French Jewishness has emerged.

=== By ethnicity ===
In an ethnic sense, an Ashkenazi Jew is a descendant of the Jews who settled in the Central European region of "Ashkenaz". For roughly a thousand years, the Ashkenazim were a reproductively isolated population in Europe, despite living in many countries, with little inflow or outflow from migration, conversion, or intermarriage with other groups, including other Jews. Geneticists have identified genetic variations found in high frequencies among Ashkenazi Jews, but not in the general European population, including patrilineal markers (Y-chromosome haplotypes) and matrilineal markers (mitotypes). Since the mid-20th century, many Ashkenazi Jews have intermarried, both with members of other Jewish communities and non-Jews.

For the important 16th century rabbinical scholar Moses Isserles, who lived and wrote in Krakow, Ashkenazi was a genealogical quality. Whether in Poland or in Moravia, these Jews descended from medieval German communities.

=== Eastern vs. Western/Central Askenazim ===
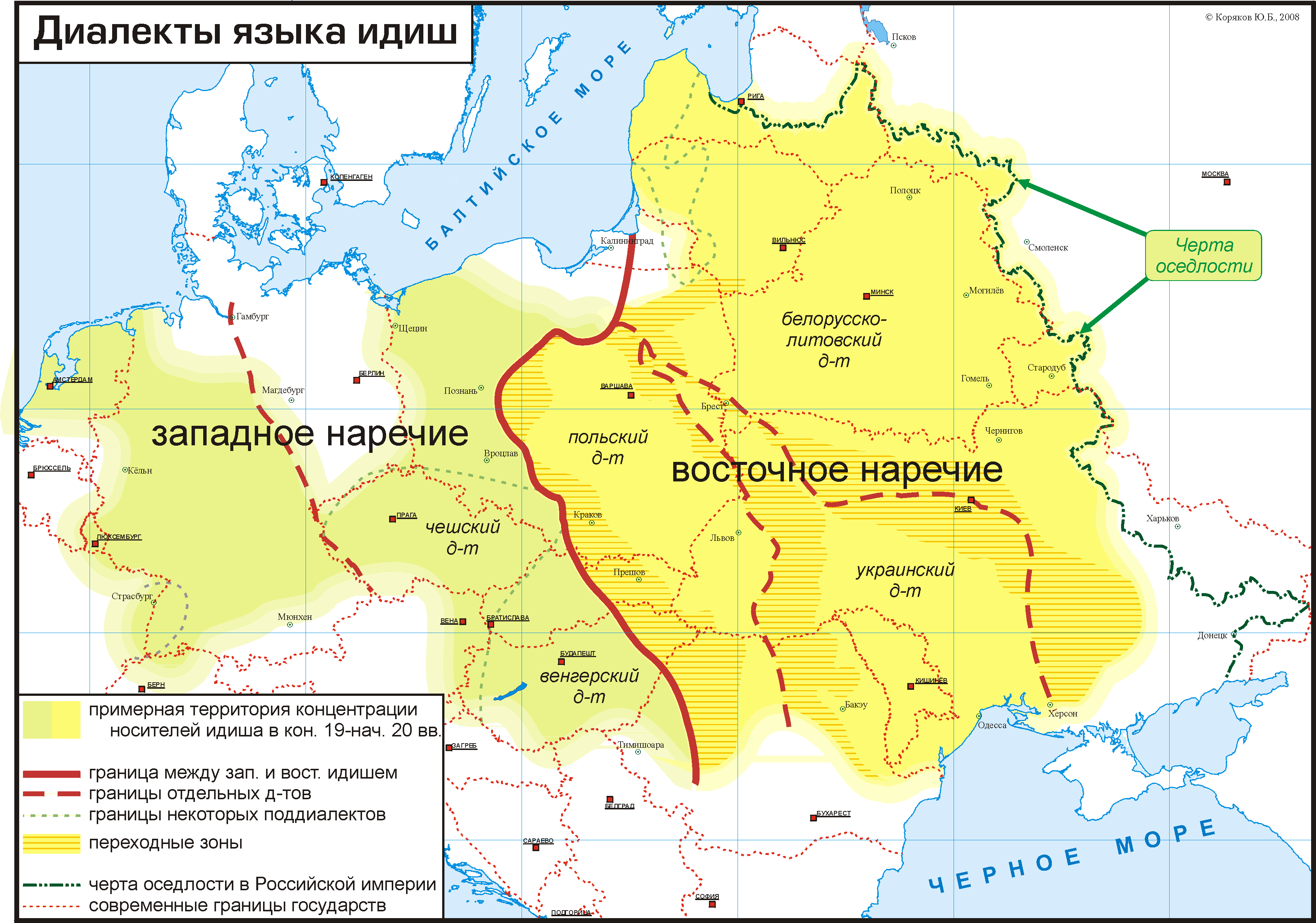
Western vs. Eastern Yiddish dialects

Religious persecution of the Jews in Western and Central Europe led to a considerable migration of the Ashkenazi Jews into Eastern Europe. This resulted in a major cultural divide between Western/Central and Eastern Ashkenazi communities. In particular, this was reflected in the division of Yiddish into Western and Eastern Yiddish dialects, as well as in other cultural distinctions: traditions, food, dress, etc. Initially the Jews of Eastern Europe enjoyed more relative freedom in terms of movement, being officially invited by the kings of the Polish–Lithuanian Commonwealth. Over time the situation reversed. By the 19th century the Jews in the West have gradually been integrating into the general society, while the Eastern Ashkenazi maintained their strict Jewish traditions and were mostly confined to ghettos, especially in the Pale of Settlement of the Russian Empire, which incorporated a considerable amount of lands where the Eastern Ashkenazi lived: Poland and Lithuania (of the Polish–Lithuanian Commonwealth).

== History ==
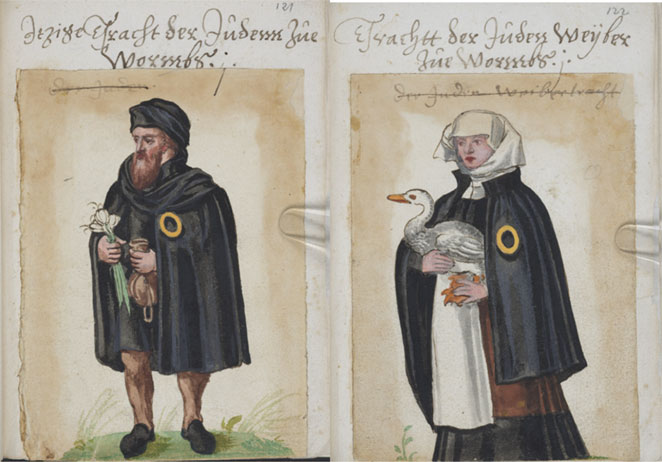
Jews from Worms (Germany) wearing the mandatory yellow badge, 16th century

Like other Jewish ethnic groups, the Ashkenazim originate from the Israelites and Hebrews of historical Israel and Judah. Ashkenazi Jews share a significant amount of ancestry with other Jewish populations and derive their ancestry mostly from populations in the Levant and Southern Europe. The question of how Ashkenazi Jews came to exist as a distinct community is unknown, and has given rise to several theories.

=== Early Jewish communities in Europe ===
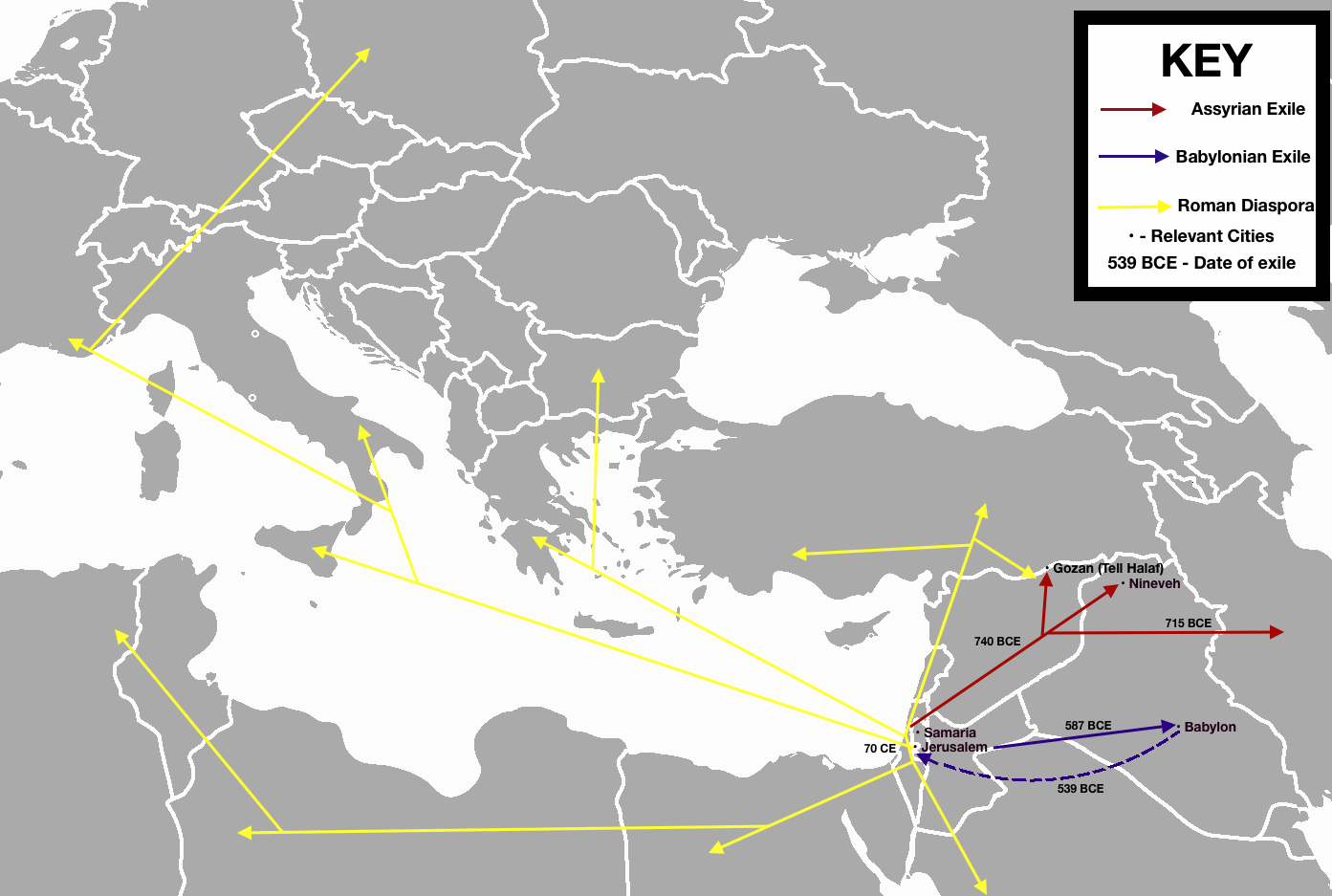
Jewish migration routes in antiquity.

Beginning in the fourth century BCE, Jewish colonies sprang up in Southern Europe, including the Aegean Islands, Greece, and Italy. Jews left ancient Israel for a number of causes, including a number of push and pull factors. More Jews moved into these communities as a result of wars, persecution, unrest, and for opportunities in trade and commerce.

Following Alexander the Great's conquests, Jews migrated to Greek settlements in the Eastern Mediterranean, spurred on by economic opportunities. Jewish economic migration to southern Europe is also believed to have occurred during the Roman period.

In 63 BCE, the Siege of Jerusalem saw the Roman Republic conquer Judea, and thousands of Jewish prisoners of war were brought to Rome as slaves. After gaining their freedom, they settled permanently in Rome as traders. It is likely that there was an additional influx of Jewish slaves taken to southern Europe by Roman forces after the capture of Jerusalem by the forces of Herod the Great with assistance from Roman forces in 37 BCE. It is known that Jewish war captives were sold into slavery after the suppression of a minor Jewish revolt in 53 BCE, and some were probably taken to southern Europe.

Regarding Jewish settlements founded in southern Europe during the Roman era, E. Mary Smallwood wrote that "no date or origin can be assigned to the numerous settlements eventually known in the west, and some may have been founded as a result of the dispersal of Palestinian Jews after the revolts of AD 66–70 and 132–135, but it is reasonable to conjecture that many, such as the settlement in Puteoli attested in 4 BC, went back to the late republic or early empire and originated in voluntary emigration and the lure of trade and commerce."

The Diaspora Jews maintained ties with the Land of Israel, embarking on pilgrimages and making voluntary donations to the Temple via the half-shekel tax. Following the destruction of the Temple in 70 CE, this internal contribution was replaced by the fiscus Judaicus, a coerced Roman tax redirected toward the construction and maintenance of the Temple of Jupiter Optimus Maximus in Rome.

=== Jewish–Roman Wars ===
The first and second centuries CE saw a series of unsuccessful large-scale Jewish revolts against Rome. The Roman suppression of these revolts led to wide-scale destruction, a very high toll of life and enslavement. The First Jewish–Roman War (66–73 CE) resulted in the destruction of Jerusalem and the Second Temple. Two generations later, the Bar Kokhba Revolt (132–136 CE) erupted. Judea's countryside was devastated, and many were killed, displaced or sold into slavery. Jerusalem was rebuilt as a Roman colony under the name of Aelia Capitolina, and the province of Judea was renamed Syria Palaestina. Jews were prohibited from entering the city on pain of death. Jewish presence in the region significantly dwindled after the failure of the Bar Kokhba revolt.

With their national aspirations crushed and widespread devastation in Judea, despondent Jews migrated out of Judea in the aftermath of both revolts, and many settled in southern Europe. In contrast to the earlier Assyrian and Babylonian captivities, the movement was by no means a singular, centralized event, and a Jewish diaspora had already been established before.

During both of these rebellions, many Jews were captured and sold into slavery by the Romans. According to the Jewish historian Josephus, 97,000 Jews were sold as slaves in the aftermath of the first revolt. In one occasion, Vespasian reportedly ordered 6,000 Jewish prisoners of war from Galilee to work on the Isthmus of Corinth in Greece. It is also possible that Jews contributed to the Colosseum's construction; an inscription from the site reads “The emperor Titus Caesar Vespasian Augustus had the new amphitheater built from the profits of the war.” Jewish slaves and their children eventually gained their freedom and joined local free Jewish communities.

=== Late antiquity ===
In the late Roman Empire, Jews were free to form networks of cultural and religious ties and enter into various local occupations. They also continued to send voluntary contributions to the Nesi'im in Israel, in accordance with Roman law. (This tax was distinct from the retributory fiscus Judaicus.) After Christianity became the official religion of Rome and Constantinople in 380 CE, Jews were increasingly marginalized and the contributions were banned.

Archaeological evidence from this period illustrates the presence of the Jewish Diaspora across the Greco-Roman world. For instance, the Ostia Synagogue near Rome is one of the oldest synagogues yet found outside the Land of Israel, dating to the first century CE. The Synagogue in the Agora of Athens is dated to the period between 267 and 396 CE. The Stobi Synagogue in Macedonia was built on the ruins of a more ancient synagogue in the 4th century, while later in the 5th century, the synagogue was transformed into a Christian basilica. Hellenistic Judaism thrived in Antioch and Alexandria, and many of these Greek-speaking Jews would convert to Christianity.

Sporadic epigraphic evidence in gravesite excavations attest to the presence of Jews after the 2nd and 3rd centuries where Roman garrisons were established, particularly in Brigetio (Szőny), Aquincum (Óbuda), Intercisa (Dunaújváros), Triccinae (Sárvár), Savaria (Szombathely), Sopianae (Pécs) in Hungary, and Mursa (Osijek) in Croatia. There was a sufficient number of Jews in Pannonia to form communities and build a synagogue. Jewish troops were among the Syrian soldiers transferred there, and replenished from the Middle East. After 175 CE Jews came from Antioch, Tarsus, and Cappadocia. Others came from Italy and the Hellenized parts of the Roman Empire. The excavations suggest they first lived in isolated enclaves attached to Roman legion camps and intermarried with other similar oriental families within the military orders of the region. Raphael Patai states that later Roman writers remarked that they differed little in either customs, manner of writing, or names from the people among whom they dwelt; and it was especially difficult to differentiate Jews from the Syrians. After Pannonia was ceded to the Huns in 433, the garrison populations were withdrawn to Italy, and only a few, enigmatic traces remain of a possible Jewish presence in the area some centuries later.

No evidence has yet been found of a Jewish presence in antiquity in Germany beyond its Roman border, nor in Eastern Europe. In Gaul and Germany itself, with the possible exception of Trier and Cologne, the archeological evidence suggests at most a fleeting presence of very few Jews, primarily itinerant traders or artisans. A substantial Jewish population emerged in northern Gaul by the Middle Ages, but Jewish communities existed in 465 CE in Brittany, in 524 CE in Valence, and in 533 CE in Orléans. Throughout this period and into the early Middle Ages, some Jews assimilated into the dominant Greek and Latin cultures, mostly through conversion to Christianity. King Dagobert I of the Franks expelled the Jews from his Merovingian kingdom in 629. Jews in former Roman territories faced new challenges as harsher anti-Jewish Church rulings were enforced.

==== Population estimate ====
Estimating the number of Jews in the Roman Empire is difficult due to a lack of accurate documentation. The 13th-century author Bar Hebraeus gave a figure of 6,944,000 Jews in the first-century Roman world and one million beyond. Salo Wittmayer Baron considered the figure convincing. However, contemporary scholars now accept that Bar Hebraeus based his figure on a census of total Roman citizens and thus included non-Jews, the figure of 6,944,000 being recorded in Eusebius' Chronicon. Louis Feldman, previously an active supporter of the figure, now states that he and Baron were mistaken. Brian McGing rejects Baron's figures entirely, arguing that we have no idea as to the size of the Jewish demographic in the ancient world. Some scholars who accepted the high number of Jews in Rome had argued it was caused by proselytising. The idea of ancient Jews trying to convert Gentiles to Judaism is nowadays rejected by several scholars.

=== Early and High Middle Ages ===
Historical records show evidence of Jewish communities north of the Alps and Pyrenees as early as the 8th and 9th centuries. Charlemagne's expansion of the Frankish empire around 800, including northern Italy and Rome, brought on a brief period of stability and unity in Francia. This created opportunities for Jewish merchants to settle again north of the Alps. Charlemagne granted the Jews freedoms similar to those once enjoyed under the Roman Empire. In addition, Jews from southern Italy, fleeing religious persecution, began to move into Central Europe. Returning to Frankish lands, many Jewish merchants took up occupations in finance and commerce, including moneylending (then commonly referred to as usury, as medieval Church law prohibited Christians from charging interest on loans). Additional Jewish merchants arrived under Louis the Pious, with Jewish communities emerging in southern France, and from there north along the Rhone River.

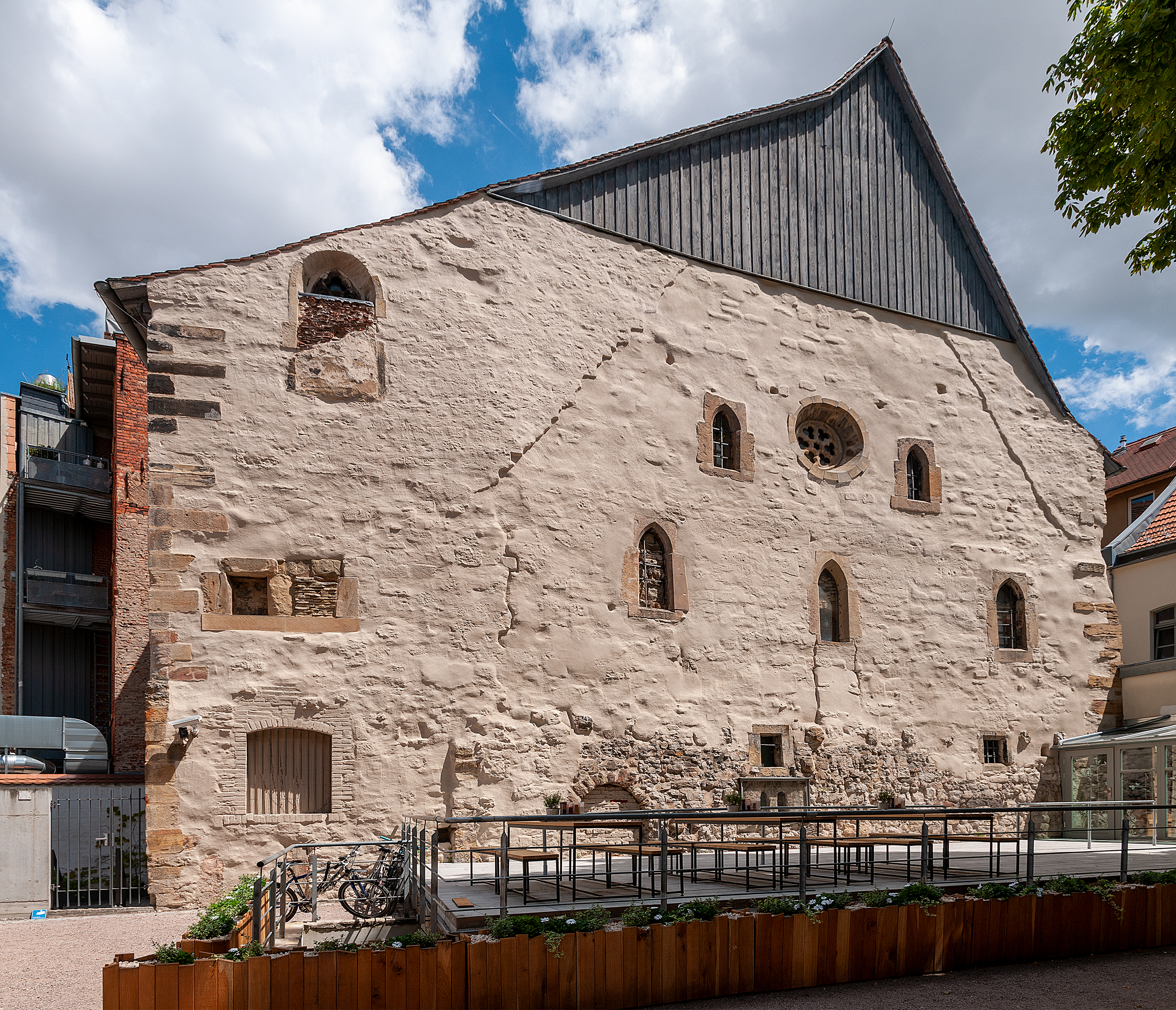
The Old Synagogue in Erfurt, Germany is thought to be the oldest synagogue building intact in Europe

Germany too saw new Jewish communities by the Rhine and Danube Rivers, including the SHuM cities of Speyer, Worms, and Mainz. This cluster of cities, along with Troyes and Sens in France, contains some of the earliest Jewish settlements north of the Alps, and played a major role in the formation of Ashkenazi Jewish religious tradition. Jews arrived from southern Europe, as well as from Middle Eastern centers (such as Babylonian Jews and Persian Jews) and Maghrebi Jewish traders from North Africa, who had contacts with their Ashkenazi brethren and had visited each other from time to time in each's domain. Jews migrated to these cities often in response to new economic opportunities and at the invitation of local Christian rulers. Thus Baldwin V, Count of Flanders, invited Jacob ben Yekutiel and his fellow Jews to settle in his lands; and soon after the Norman conquest of England, William the Conqueror likewise extended a welcome to continental Jews to take up residence there. Bishop Rüdiger Huzmann called on the Jews of Mainz to relocate to Speyer. In all of these decisions, the idea that Jews had the know-how and capacity to jump-start the economy, improve revenues, and enlarge trade seems to have played a prominent role. Typically, Jews relocated close to the markets and churches in town centres, where, though they came under the authority of both royal and ecclesiastical powers, they were accorded administrative autonomy.

In the 11th century, the "Rabbinic mode of thought and life" and the culture of the Babylonian Talmud that underlies it became established in southern Italy and then spread north in what came to be known as "Ashkenaz". Jews in Ashkenaz were known for their halakhic and Talmudic studies. However, many traditions and customs from the Jerusalem Talmud and other Land of Israel rabbinic sources were known and practiced in Ashkenaz long before the 11th century—so long before that the sources of these practices were forgotten by 11th-century Ashkenazi writers, and the practices regarded simply as "minhag".

By the 11th century, Yiddish emerged as a result of Judeo-Latin language contact with various High German vernaculars in the medieval period. It is a Germanic language written in Hebrew letters, and heavily influenced by Hebrew and Aramaic, with some elements of Romance and later Slavic languages.

In the 9th through 11th centuries, diaspora Jews from Europe embarked on pilgrimages to Jerusalem for the holiday of Sukkot and attended the annual Mount of Olives Hoshana Rabbah ceremony. Ashkenazi Jews also lived in Jerusalem during the 11th century, according to 16th-century mystic Rabbi Elijah of Chelm. The story is told that a German-speaking Jew saved the life of a young German man surnamed Dolberger. So when the knights of the First Crusade came to siege Jerusalem, one of Dolberger's family members who was among them rescued Jews in Palestine and carried them back to Worms to repay the favor. Further evidence of German communities in the holy city comes in the form of halakhic questions sent from Germany to Jerusalem during the second half of the 11th century.

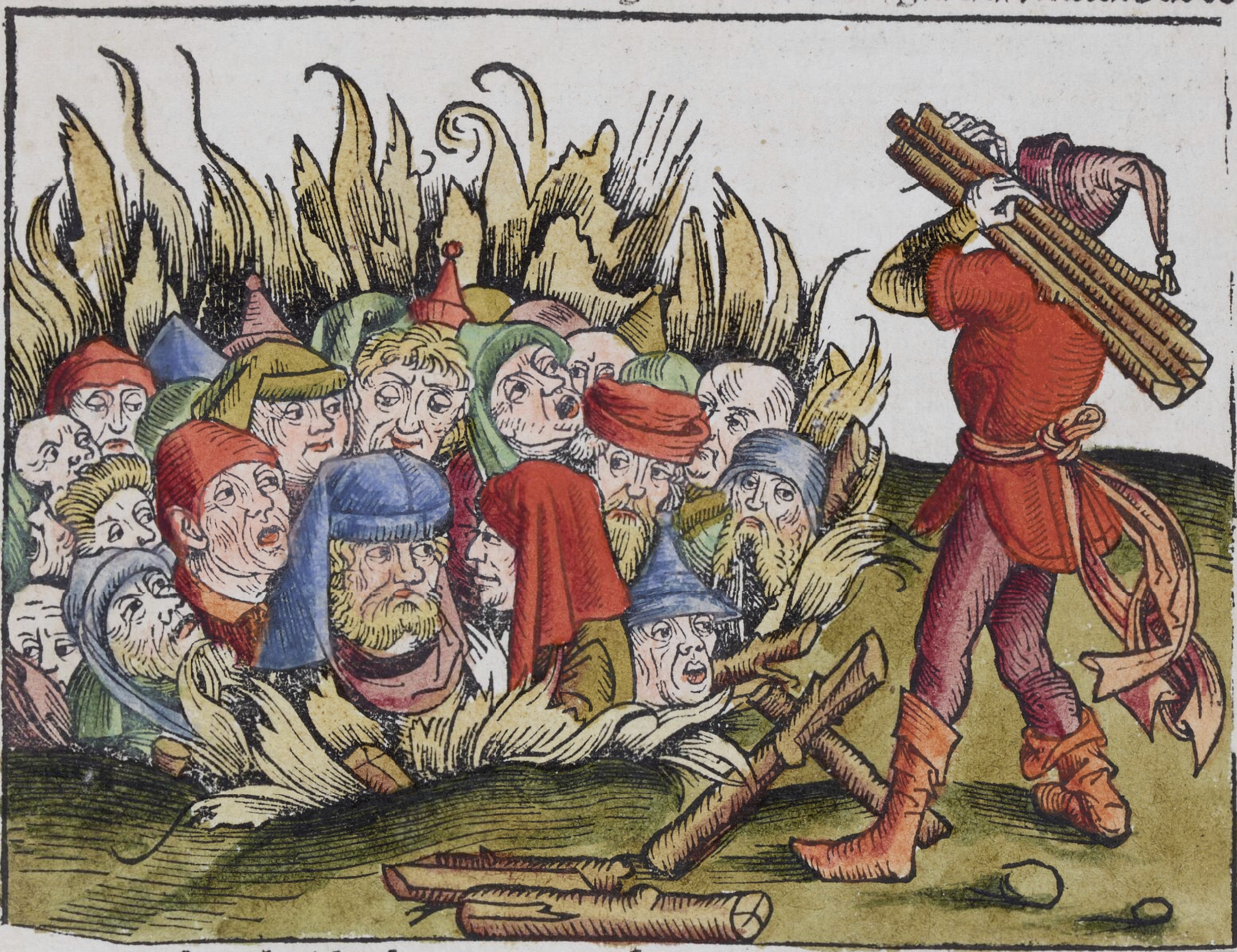
A colored woodcut in Liber Chronicarum (1493) depicts Jews being burned alive in Deggendorf, 1338.

Numerous massacres of Jews occurred throughout Europe during the Christian Crusades. Inspired by the preaching of a First Crusade, crusader mobs in France and Germany perpetrated the Rhineland massacres of 1096, devastating Jewish communities along the Rhine River, including the SHuM cities of Speyer, Worms, and Mainz. Nonetheless, Jewish life in Germany persisted, while some Ashkenazi Jews joined Sephardic Jewry in Spain.

=== Late Middle Ages ===
Expulsions from England (1290), France (1394), and parts of Germany (15th century), gradually pushed Ashkenazi Jewry eastward, to Poland (10th century), Lithuania (10th century), and Russia (12th century). Over this period of several hundred years, some have suggested, Jewish economic activity was focused on trade, business management, and financial services, due to several presumed factors: Christian European prohibitions restricting certain activities by Jews, preventing certain financial activities (such as "usurious" loans) between Christians, high rates of literacy, near-universal male education, and ability of merchants to rely upon and trust family members living in different regions and countries.

In Poland, Jews were granted special protection by the Statute of Kalisz of 1264. By the 15th century, the Ashkenazi Jewish communities in Poland were the largest Jewish communities of the Diaspora. This area, which eventually fell under the domination of Russia, Austria, and Prussia (Germany) following the Partitions of Poland, and was later largely regained by reborn Poland in the interbellum, would remain the main center of Ashkenazi Jewry until the Holocaust.

The answer to why there was so little assimilation of Jews in central and eastern Europe for so long would seem to lie in part in the probability that the alien surroundings in central and eastern Europe were not conducive, though there was some assimilation. Furthermore, Jews lived almost exclusively in shtetls, maintained a strong system of education for males, heeded rabbinic leadership, and had a very different lifestyle to that of their neighbours; all of these tendencies increased with every outbreak of antisemitism.

In parts of Eastern Europe, before the arrival of the Ashkenazi Jews from Central Europe, some non-Ashkenazi Jews were present who spoke Leshon Knaan and held various other Non-Ashkenazi traditions and customs. In 1966, the historian Cecil Roth questioned the inclusion of all Yiddish speaking Jews as Ashkenazim in descent, suggesting that upon the arrival of Ashkenazi Jews from central Europe to Eastern Europe, from the Middle Ages to the 16th century, there were a substantial number of non-Ashkenazim Jews already there who later abandoned their original Eastern European Jewish culture in favor of the Ashkenazi one.

However, according to more recent research, mass migrations of Yiddish-speaking Ashkenazi Jews occurred to Eastern Europe, from Central Europe in the west, who due to high birth rates absorbed and largely replaced the preceding non-Ashkenazi Jewish groups of Eastern Europe (whose numbers the demographer Sergio Della Pergola considers to have been small). Genetic evidence also indicates that Yiddish-speaking Eastern European Jews largely descend from Ashkenazi Jews who migrated from central to eastern Europe and subsequently experienced high birthrates and genetic isolation.

By the late-fourteenth century, the Ashkenazi population in Jerusalem had grown, and a yeshiva for them was established by Isaac Asir HaTikvah. They prayed in the same synagogue as the Sephardim, however. Additional European Jews arrived in the 15th century, such as Elijah of Ferrara.

=== Early modern period ===
Some Jewish immigration from Southern Europe to Eastern Europe continued into the early modern period. During the 16th century, as conditions for Italian Jews worsened, many Jews from Venice and the surrounding area migrated to Poland and Lithuania. During the 16th and 17th centuries, some Sephardi Jews and Romaniote Jews from throughout the Ottoman Empire migrated to Eastern Europe, as did Arabic-speaking Mizrahi Jews and Persian Jews.

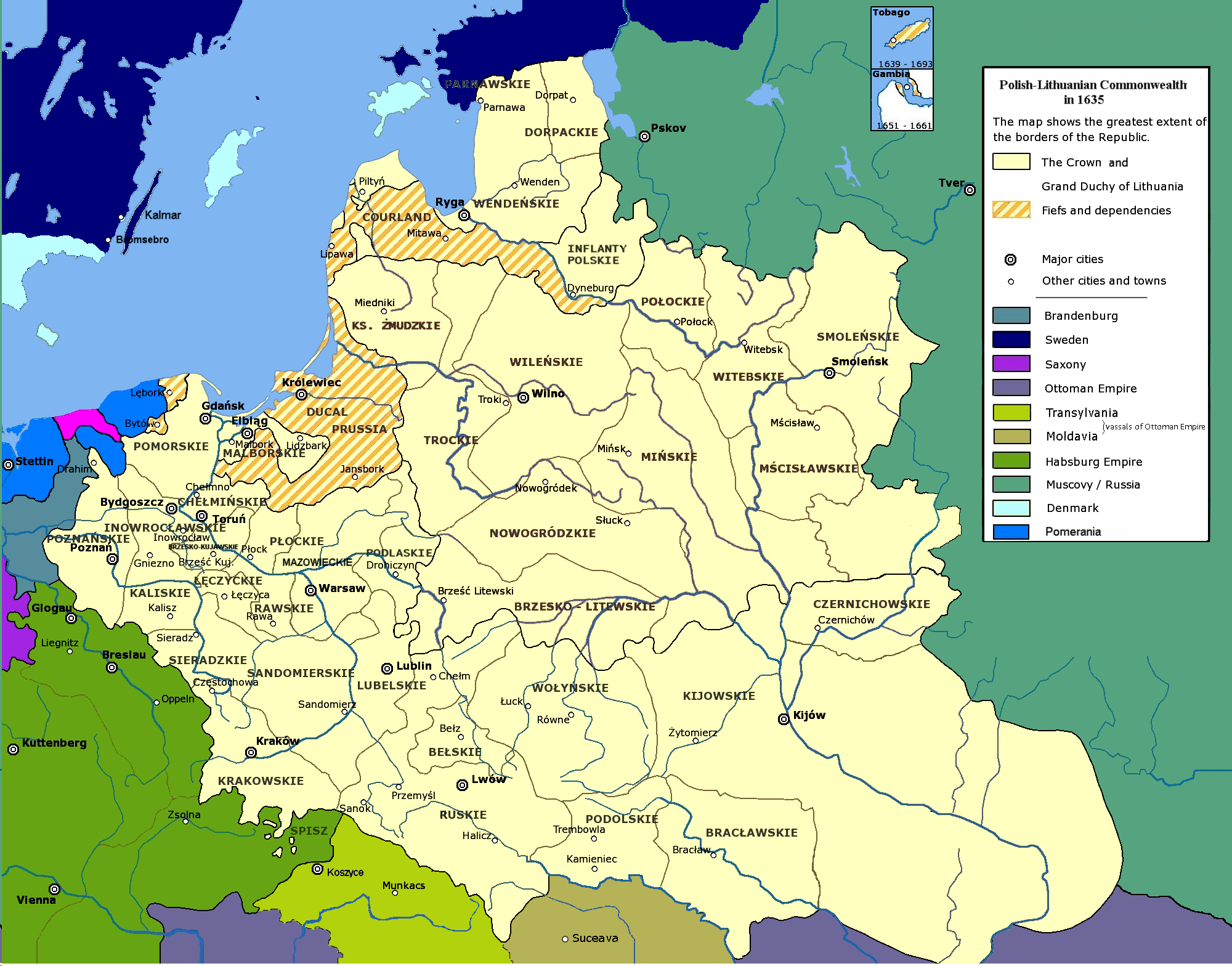
The Polish-Lithuanian Commonwealth at its greatest extent

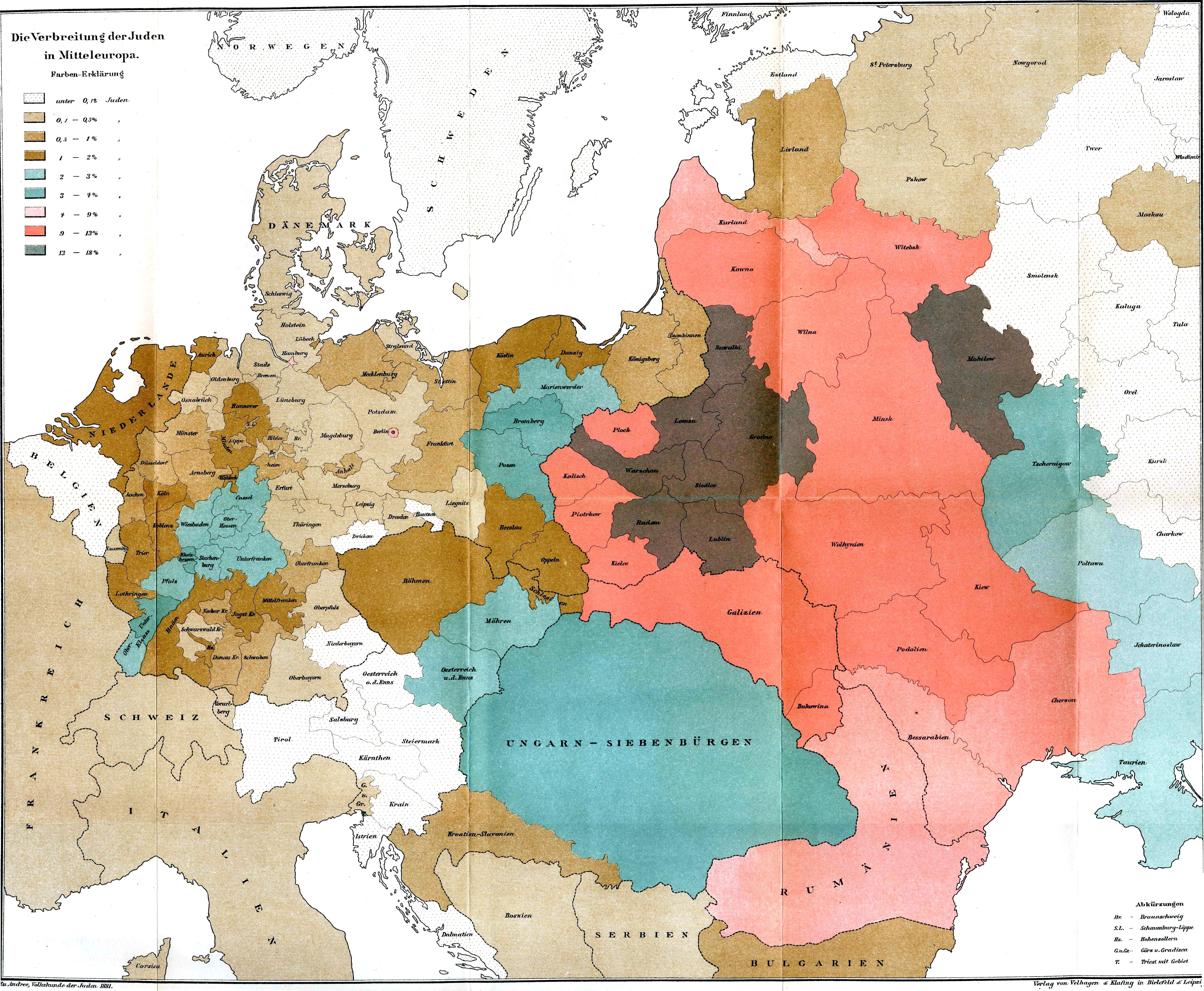
The distribution of Jews in Central Europe in 1881

Material relating to the history of German Jews has been preserved in the communal accounts of certain communities on the Rhine, a Memorbuch, and a Liebesbrief, documents that are now part of the Sassoon Collection. Heinrich Graetz also added to the history of German Jewry in modern times in the abstract of his seminal work, History of the Jews, which he entitled "Volksthümliche Geschichte der Juden".

In an essay on Sephardi Jewry, Daniel Elazar at the Jerusalem Center for Public Affairs summarized the demographic history of Ashkenazi Jews in the last thousand years. He noted that at the end of the 11th century, 97% of world Jewry was Sephardic and 3% Ashkenazi; in the mid-17th century, "Sephardim still outnumbered Ashkenazim three to two"; by the end of the 18th century, "Ashkenazim outnumbered Sephardim three to two, the result of improved living conditions in Christian Europe versus the Ottoman Muslim world." By 1930, Arthur Ruppin estimated that Ashkenazi Jews accounted for nearly 92% of world Jewry. These factors are sheer demography showing the migration patterns of Jews from Southern and Western Europe to Central and Eastern Europe.

In 1740, a family from Lithuania became the first Ashkenazi Jews to settle in the Jewish Quarter of Jerusalem.

In the generations after emigration from the west, Jewish communities in places like Poland, Russia, and Belarus enjoyed a comparatively stable socio-political environment. A thriving publishing industry and the printing of hundreds of biblical commentaries precipitated the development of the Hasidic movement as well as major Jewish academic centers. After two centuries of comparative tolerance in the new nations, massive westward emigration occurred in the 19th and 20th centuries in response to pogroms in the east and the economic opportunities offered in other parts of the world. Ashkenazi Jews have made up the majority of the American Jewish community since 1750.

In the context of the European Enlightenment, Jewish emancipation began in 18th-century France and spread throughout Western and Central Europe. Legal restrictions known as disabilities, which had limited the rights of Jews since the Middle Ages, were abolished, including requirements to wear distinctive clothing, pay special taxes, and live in ghettos isolated from non-Jewish communities, as well as prohibitions on certain professions. Laws were passed to integrate Jews into their host countries, forcing Ashkenazi Jews to adopt family names (they had formerly used patronymics).

=== Late modern period ===
Newfound inclusion into public life in the late modern period led to cultural growth during the Haskalah, or Jewish Enlightenment, with its goal of integrating modern European values into Jewish life. In reaction to increasing antisemitism and assimilation following the emancipation, Zionism developed in central Europe. Other Jews, particularly those living in the Pale of Settlement, turned to socialism. These tendencies would be united in Labor Zionism, the founding ideology of the State of Israel.

==== The Holocaust ====
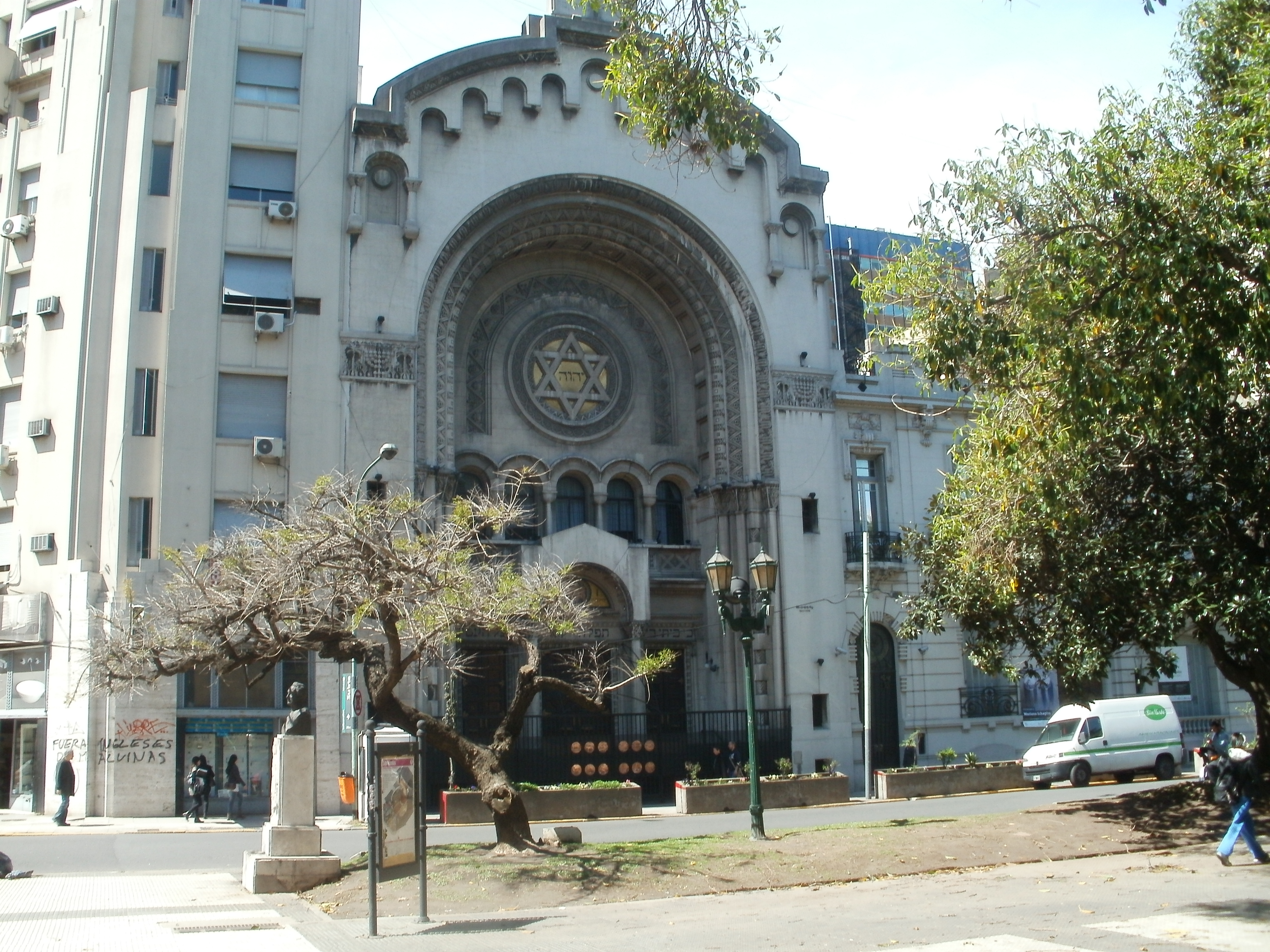
The Liberty Temple in Buenos Aires, Argentina, founded in 1932.

Of the estimated 8.8 million Jews living in Europe at the beginning of World War II, the majority of whom were Ashkenazi, about 6 million – more than two-thirds – were systematically murdered in the Holocaust. These included 3 million of 3.3 million Polish Jews (91%); 900,000 of 1.5 million in Ukraine (60%); and 50–90% of the Jews of other Slavic nations, Germany, Hungary, and the Baltic states, and over 25% of the Jews in France. Sephardi communities suffered similar devastation in a few countries, including Greece, the Netherlands and the former Yugoslavia.

Because the large majority of Holocaust victims were Ashkenazi Jews, their percentage dropped from an estimate of 92% of world Jewry in 1930 to nearly 80% of world Jewry today. The Holocaust also effectively put an end to the dynamic development of the Yiddish language in the preceding decades, because the vast majority of Jewish victims of the Holocaust, around 5 million, were Yiddish speakers.

=== Contemporary history ===
Many of the surviving Ashkenazi Jews emigrated to countries such as Israel, Canada, Argentina, Australia, United Kingdom, and the United States after the war.

Following the Holocaust, some sources place Ashkenazim today as making up approximately 83–85% of Jews worldwide, while Sergio DellaPergola in a rough calculation of Sephardic and Mizrahi Jews, implies that Ashkenazi make up a notably lower figure, less than 74%. Other estimates place Ashkenazi Jews as making up about 75% of Jews worldwide.

==== Israel ====
From the 1880s onwards, Ashkenazi Jews from Russia, Poland and Germany immigrated to the Land of Israel in large numbers. By 1948, they comprised 80% of the Jewish population of Israel, shortly before the Jewish exodus from the Muslim world brought more Sephardic and Mizrahi Jews into Israeli society.

Today, Jews of mixed background are increasingly common, and many no longer see such historic markers of identity as relevant to their life experiences. Between the 1950s and late 1990s, intermarriage increased, such that the number of Jewish Israelis with multiethnic parents doubled from 14% to 28%. Relations between the Ashkenazi and non-Ashkenazi communities have also been tense at times, marred by claims of racism on all sides. This has given rise to protest movements such as the Israeli Black Panthers, led by Saadia Marciano, a Moroccan Jew.

Ashkenazi Jews have played a prominent role in the economy, media, and politics (Note: As of 2013, every President of Israel since the country's founding in 1948 has been an Ashkenazi Jew) of Israel since its founding. During the first decades of Israel as a state, strong cultural conflict occurred between Sephardic and Ashkenazi Jews (mainly east European Ashkenazim). The roots of this conflict, which still exists to a much smaller extent in present-day Israeli society, are chiefly attributed to the concept of the "melting pot". That is to say, all Jewish immigrants who arrived in Israel were strongly encouraged to "meltdown" their own particular exilic identities within the general social "pot" in order to become Israeli.

Religious Ashkenazi Jews living in Israel are obliged to follow the authority of the chief Ashkenazi rabbi in halakhic matters. In this respect, a religiously Ashkenazi Jew is an Israeli who is more likely to support certain religious interests in Israel, including certain political parties. These political parties result from the fact that a portion of the Israeli electorate votes for Jewish religious parties; although the electoral map changes from one election to another, there are generally several small parties associated with the interests of religious Ashkenazi Jews. The role of religious parties, including small religious parties that play important roles as coalition members, results in turn from Israel's composition as a complex society in which competing social, economic, and religious interests stand for election to the Knesset, a unicameral legislature with 120 seats.

==== United States ====
As of 2020, 66% of American Jews identify as Ashkenazic, compared to 4% who identify as Sephardic or Mizrahi, and 6% who claim mixed heritage. A disproportionate number of Ashkenazi Americans are religious compared to American Jews of other ethnic groups. They live in large populations in the states of New York, California, Florida, and New Jersey. The majority of American Ashkenazi Jewish voters vote for the Democratic Party; Orthodox Ashkenazim tend to support the Republican Party, while Conservative, Reform, and non denominational Ashkenazim tend to support the Democratic Party.

Although Ashkenazi Jews have never exceeded 3% of the U.S. population, as of 2006 Jews had accounted for 37% of the winners of the U.S. National Medal of Science, 25% of the American Nobel Prize winners in literature, and 40% of the American Nobel Prize winners in science and economics.

== Customs, laws, and traditions ==
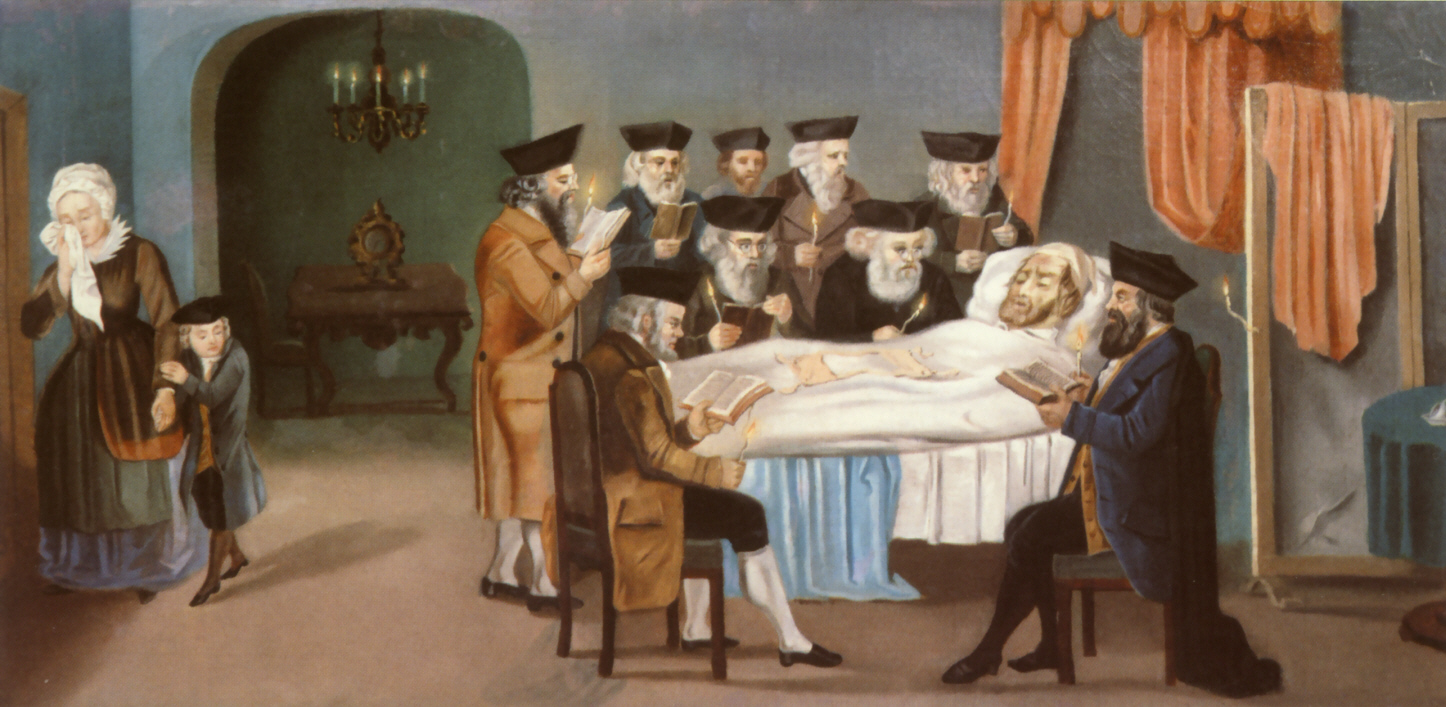
Prague's chevra kadisha, or burial society (oil, c. 1800)

The Halakhic practices of (Orthodox) Ashkenazi Jews may differ from those of Sephardi Jews, particularly in matters of custom. Joseph Karo's Shulchan Aruch (1563) codified Halakhic law, and during the century after its publication this text, along with Moses Isserles' notes on it, "became the normative code of law for Ashkenazic Jews." Well known differences in practice include:

- During Pesach (Passover), Ashkenazi Jews traditionally refrain from eating legumes, grain, millet, and rice (quinoa, however, has become accepted as foodgrain in the North American communities), whereas Sephardi Jews typically do not prohibit these foods.
- Both orthodox Ashkenazi and Sephardi don't mix fish with meat. although some Sephardic Jews also refrain from mixing fish and dairy.
- Ashkenazi married women commonly wear wigs (sheitels) as a hair covering, and in many Hasidic groups, this is considered a mandate.
- Notwithstanding stricter requirements for the actual slaughter, Sephardi Jews permit the rear portions of an animal after proper Halakhic removal of the sciatic nerve, while many Ashkenazi Jews do not.
- Ashkenazi Jews often name newborn children after deceased family members, but not after living relatives. Sephardi Jews, in contrast, often name their children after the children's grandparents, even if those grandparents are still living. A notable exception to this generally reliable rule is among Dutch Jews, where Ashkenazim for centuries used the naming conventions otherwise attributed exclusively to Sephardim such as Chuts.
- Ashkenazi tefillin bear some differences from Sephardic tefillin. In the traditional Ashkenazic rite, the tefillin are wound towards the body, not away from it. Ashkenazim traditionally don tefillin while standing, whereas other Jews generally do so while sitting down.
- Ashkenazic traditional pronunciations of Hebrew differ from those of other groups. The most prominent consonantal difference from Sephardic and Mizrahic Hebrew dialects is the pronunciation of the Hebrew letter tav in certain Hebrew words (historically, in postvocalic undoubled context) as an /s/ and not a /t/ or /θ/ sound.
- The prayer shawl or tallit (tallis in Ashkenazi Hebrew) is worn by all Ashkenazi men after marriage, except western European Ashkenazi men, who wear it from bar mitzvah. In Sephardi or Mizrahi Judaism, the prayer shawl is commonly worn from early childhood.

=== Ashkenazic liturgy ===
The term Ashkenazi also refers to the Nusach Ashkenaz, the liturgical tradition used by Ashkenazi Jews in their siddur (prayer book). A nusach is defined by a liturgical tradition's choice of prayers, the order of prayers, the text of prayers, and melodies used in the singing of prayers. Two other major forms of nusach among Ashkenazic Jews are Nusach Sefard (not to be confused with the Sephardic ritual), which is the general Polish Hasidic nusach, and Nusach Ari, used by those in Chabad.

== Population by country ==
Country	Jewish population	Ashkenazim	References
United States	6,300,000–7,500,000	5,700,000–6,750,000	
Israel (Note: The Israel Central Bureau of Statistics includes East Jerusalem, the Golan Heights, and Area C of the West Bank in its statistics.)	7,300,000–7,455,200	3,200,000–3,750,000 (Note: Smaller figure includes 12.4% Jews from the former USSR (nearly all Ashkenazi) and 31.8% all other Ashkenazi Jews. Larger figure also includes 7.9% mixed Ashkenazi, Sephardic and Mizrahi Jews.)	
Canada	400,000–450,000	350,000	
United Kingdom	312,000–330,000	273,000	
France	438,500–550,000	180,000–240,000	
Argentina	171,000–240,000	147,000	
Germany	118,000–125,000	Sources state that the majority of Jews in the country are Askenazim, but do not provide a specific figure.	
Australia	117,200–130,000	93,000–115,000	
Russia	132,000–290,000	82,644–121,000 (Note: Lower number is self-identifying, 2021 census. Since the 2002 Russian census, people are free to choose what ethnicity they enter on the census form, or to not enter any ethnicity.)	
Hungary	46,500–100,000	Sources state that the majority of Jews in the country are Askenazim, but do not provide a specific figure.	
South Africa	51,000–75,000	70,000	
Brazil	91,000–180,000	46,000–75,000	
Ukraine	40,000–190,000	44,550	
Belarus	13,700–60,000		
Mexico	40,000–65,000	34,000	
Netherlands	29,700–63,000	29,200–44,100	
Belgium	28,800–45,000	22,500–25,400 (Note: Lower figure is Ashkenazi Jews; larger figure includes mixed Ashkenazi/Sephardic Jews)	
Sweden	15,000–25,000	Sources state that the majority of Jews in the country are Askenazim, but do not provide a specific figure.	
Moldova	2,310–20,000	Sources state that the majority of Jews in the country are Askenazim, but do not provide a specific figure.	
Chile	15,800–28,000	14,300	
Uruguay	16,300–28,000	13,500	
Italy	27,000–48,000	10,500 (Note: The total figure of Italian Jews is estimated to be 27,300, which includes Italian, Sephardic, Ashkenazi, Persian, and Libyan Jews. Ashkenazi Jews are primarily located in Northern Italy)	
Poland	10,000	Sources state that the majority of Jews in the country are Askenazim, but do not provide a specific figure.	
New Zealand	7,500–12,000	Sources state that the majority of Jews in the country are Askenazim, but do not provide a specific figure.	
Romania	8,700–20,500	8,900	
Austria	10,300–22,000	7,210–8,400	
Latvia	4,500	Sources state that the majority of Jews in the country are Askenazim, but do not provide a specific figure.	
Azerbaijan	6,900–17,500	4,300	
Czech Republic	3,500	Sources state that the majority of Jews in the country are Askenazim, but do not provide a specific figure.	
Colombia	2,000–4,500	2,000–3,500	
Ireland	2,700	Sources state that the majority of Jews in the country are Askenazim, but do not provide a specific figure.	
Slovakia	2,600	Sources state that the majority of Jews in the country are Askenazim, but do not provide a specific figure.	
Lithuania	2,400	Sources state that the majority of Jews in the country are Askenazim, but do not provide a specific figure.	
Estonia	1,939	Sources state that the majority of Jews in the country are Askenazim, but do not provide a specific figure.	

== Genetics ==
=== Genetic origins ===
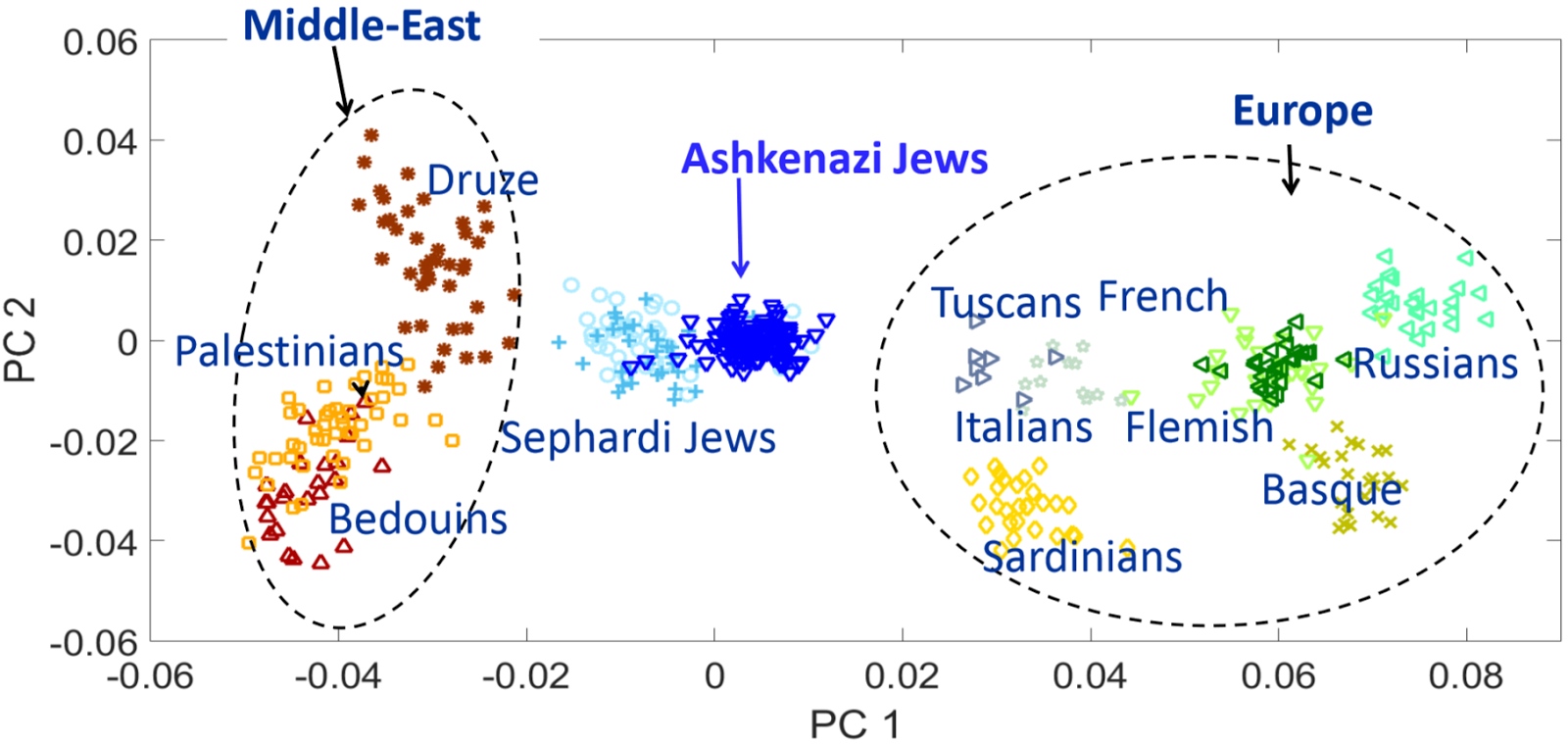
A PCA plot of samples from Ashkenazi and other Jewish populations, as well as HGDP's Middle Eastern and European populations.

Efforts to identify the origins of Ashkenazi Jews through DNA analysis began in the 1990s. Like most DNA studies of human migration patterns, the earliest studies on Ashkenazi Jews focused on the paternal Y-DNA and maternal mtDNA segments of the human genome. Both segments are unaffected by recombination (except for the ends of the Y chromosome – the pseudoautosomal regions known as PAR1 and PAR2), thus allowing tracing of direct maternal and paternal lineages. More recently, genome-wide association studies have also been used for autosomal genetic origin testing.

These studies revealed that Ashkenazi Jews originate from an ancient (2000–700 BCE) population of the Middle East who spread to Europe. Ashkenazic Jews display the homogeneity of a genetic bottleneck, meaning they descend from a larger population whose numbers were greatly reduced but recovered through a few founding individuals. Although the Jewish people, in general, were present across a wide geographical area, genetic research by Gil Atzmon of the Longevity Genes Project at Albert Einstein College of Medicine "suggests that Ashkenazim branched off from other Jews around the time of the destruction of the First Temple, 2,500 years ago" and that they "flourished during the Roman Empire but then went through a 'severe bottleneck' as they dispersed, reducing a population of several million to just 400 families who left Northern Italy around the year 1000 for Central and eventually Eastern Europe."

Studies indicate that Ashkenazim have both Levantine and European (mainly southern and eastern) ancestry. These studies draw diverging conclusions about the degree and sources of European admixture, with some focusing on the European genetic origin in some Ashkenazi maternal lineages and others focusing on the predominantly Middle Eastern genetic origin in paternal lineages. Conversely, a 2025 statistical review found that most Ashkenazi Jews descend maternally from about 150 Near Eastern families, with existing but minimal outside genetic input, supporting a unified Near Eastern origin for paternal lineages as well as, mostly, for maternal lineages, highlighting that "results reinforce the genetic evidence of a unified founding population and strongly favor a straightforward model consisting of a Near Eastern origin for both maternal and paternal founding lineages... the hypothesis that the Ashkenazi founder population consisted of Levantine males and European females is found to be implausible."

Research in 2010 revealed a genetic common ancestry of all Jewish populations. Collectively, Ashkenazi Jews are less genetically diverse than other Jewish ethnic divisions, due to their genetic bottleneck.

==== Male lineages: Y-chromosomal DNA ====
Most genetic studies of Ashkenazi Jews conclude that the male lines were from the Middle East.

A 2000 study by Hammer and co-authors found that the Y-chromosome of Ashkenazi and Sephardic Jews contained mutations that are also common among Middle Eastern peoples, but uncommon among indigenous Europeans. This suggests that Ashkenazim male ancestors are mostly from the Middle East. Ashkenazim had less than 0.5% male genetic admixture per generation over an estimated 80 generations, with "relatively minor contribution of European Y chromosomes to the Ashkenazim," and the total admixture estimate "very similar to Motulsky's average estimate of 12.5%". This supported the finding that "Diaspora Jews from Europe, Northwest Africa, and the Near East resemble each other more closely than they resemble their non-Jewish neighbors." "Past research found that 50%–80% of DNA from the Ashkenazi Y chromosome, which is used to trace the male lineage, originated in the Near East," Richards said.

A 2001 study by Nebel and co-authors showed that Ashkenazi and Sephardic Jews share overall Near Eastern paternal ancestries. In comparison with data available from other relevant populations in the region, Jews were found to be more closely related to groups in the north of the Fertile Crescent. The study also found Eu 19 (R1a) chromosomes had elevated frequency among Ashkenazi Jews (13%), and they are very frequent in Central and Eastern Europeans (54–60%). They hypothesized that the differences among Ashkenazim could reflect low-level gene flow from surrounding European populations or genetic drift during isolation. A 2005 study by Nebel et al., found a similar level of 11.5% of male Ashkenazim belonging to R1a1a (M17+), the dominant Y-chromosome haplogroup in Central and Eastern Europeans. However, a 2017 study, of Ashkenazi Levites where the proportion reaches 50%, found a "rich variation of haplogroup R1a outside of Europe which is phylogenetically separate from the typically European R1a branches", and concludes that the particular R1a-Y2619 sub-clade is evidence for a local origin, and that this validates the "Middle Eastern origin of the Ashkenazi Levite lineage" which had previously been concluded based on a few samples.

==== Female lineages: Mitochondrial DNA ====
A 2006 study by Behar and co-authors, of 1,000 units of haplogroup K (mtDNA), suggested that about 40% of today's Ashkenazim descend from just four women who were "likely from a Hebrew/Levantine mtDNA pool" originating in the Middle East in the 1st and 2nd centuries CE. The rest of Ashkenazi mtDNA reportedly originated from about 150 women, most of whom were also likely of Middle Eastern origin. Specifically, although haplogroup K is common throughout western Eurasia, its global distribution makes it very unlikely that "the four aforementioned founder lineages entered the Ashkenazi mtDNA pool via gene flow from a European host population".

A 2013 study led by Martin B. Richards of all 16,600 DNA units of mtDNA found that the four main female Ashkenazi founders had descent lines that were established in Europe 10,000 to 20,000 years in the past, primarily of Italian and Old French origins. The study estimated that more than 80% of Ashkenazi maternal ancestry comes from women indigenous to primarily Western Europe, and 8% from the Near East, with the remainder undetermined. The study states the "results point to a significant role for the conversion of women in the formation of Ashkenazi communities." Karl Skorecki conversely argued that while it "re-opened the question of the maternal origins of Ashkenazi Jewry, the phylogenetic analysis in the manuscript does not 'settle' the question."

A 2014 study by Fernández and co-authors found that Ashkenazi Jews display a frequency of haplogroup K in their maternal DNA, suggesting an ancient Near Eastern matrilineal origin, similar to the results of the Behar study in 2006. Fernández noted that this observation clearly contradicts the results of the 2013 study led by Richards that suggested a European source for 3 exclusively Ashkenazi K lineages.

In his 2022 book The Maternal Genetic Lineages of Ashkenazic Jews, Kevin Brook found that the majority of Ashkenazi Jewish mitochondrial DNA lineages of European origin show no specific ties to Italy, contradicting hypotheses that all or most of these lineages originated from central or northern Italian women who converted to Judaism. Brook concluded that 30–40% of Ashkenazi maternal genome has roots in the Middle East. This estimate excluded haplogroup K1a1b1a, whose origins had not been attributed to a specific location. Consequently, if this lineage were included among those of Middle Eastern origin, the percentage of Ashkenazi matrilines traceable to that region would rise to approximately 50–60%.

A 2025 study by Joseph Livni and Karl Skorecki examined mitochondrial DNA (mtDNA) in the Ashkenazi Jewish population and found that the maternal ancestry of most Ashkenazi Jews traces back to a small founding group of around 150 women. The study introduced a method to distinguish between founder and absorbed mtDNA lineages, revealing that fewer than 15% of present-day Ashkenazi Jews carry absorbed mtDNA from outside populations. Absorbed lineages typically appeared as singletons, while founder lineages occurred multiple times. These findings contradict earlier theories suggesting a mixed origin, specifically, Near Eastern male and European female founders, and instead support a unified origin for both maternal and paternal lineages in the Near East. This conclusion is consistent with prior Y-chromosome evidence indicating a Near Eastern paternal origin.

==== Association and linkage studies (autosomal DNA) ====
In genetic epidemiology, a genome-wide association study is an examination of most or all of the genome to determine the extent of genetic variation between individuals. Autosomal DNA studies are used to estimate genetic similarity and trace the admixture history of populations. Note, however, that the modern population of Southern Europe, often used as the European reference population in such studies, itself contains substantial ancient Middle Eastern ancestry, while present-day populations of the Levant exhibit considerable recent Sub-Saharan African ancestry, leading to an underestimation of the Levantine component of the Ashkenazi Jewish genome.

Estimated ancestry proportions
Study	Tool / method	Middle Eastern	European
Lerga-Jaso et al., 2025	Orchestra / LAI	23.8% (16.6% Levantine, 7.2% ICT)	72.1% (68% Italian, (Note: Derived from a Local Ancestry Inference model trained on a modern Italian population.) 2.4% Greek, 1.7% Eastern Europe)
Waldman et al., 2022	QpAdm	19%	81%: 65% Southern Italian, 16% Eastern Europe
Waldman et al., 2022	QpAdm	43%	57%: 37% North Italian, 20% Eastern Europe
Waldman et al., 2022	QpAdm	32%	68%: 51% Greek, 17% Eastern Europe
Agranat-Tamir et al., 2020	LINADMIX, PHCP	59% (MLBA Levant and chalcolithic Iran)	41% (Late Neolithic and Bronze Age Europe)
Xue et al., 2017	GLOBETROTTER	30% (Levantine)	70% (55% Southern EU, 10% Eastern EU, 5% Western EU)
Xue et al., 2017	RFMix / LAI	47% (mostly Levantine)	53%

A 2006 study by Seldin and co-authors used over 5,000 autosomal SNPs to demonstrate European genetic substructure. The results showed "a consistent and reproducible distinction between 'northern' and 'southern' European population groups". Most northern, central, and eastern Europeans (Finns, Swedes, English, Irish, Germans, and Ukrainians) showed >90%, while most southern Europeans (Italians, Greeks, Portuguese, Spaniards) showed >85%. Both Ashkenazi and Sephardic Jews showed >85% membership in the "southern" group. Referring to the Jews clustering with southern Europeans, the authors state the results were "consistent with a later Mediterranean origin of these ethnic groups".

A 2007 study by Bauchet and co-authors found that Ashkenazim were most closely clustered with Arabic North African populations than with the global population, and in the European structure analysis, they share similarities only with Greeks and Southern Italians, reflecting their east Mediterranean origins.

A 2010 study of Jewish ancestry by Atzmon-Ostrer and co-authors identified two major groups: Middle Eastern Jews and European/Syrian Jews, by using "principal component, phylogenetic, and identity by descent (IBD) analysis". "The IBD segment sharing and the proximity of European Jews to each other and to southern European populations suggested similar origins for European Jewry and refuted large-scale genetic contributions of Central and Eastern European and Slavic populations to the formation of Ashkenazi Jewry", as the two groups share ancestors in the Middle East about 2500 years ago. The study examines genetic markers spread across the entire genome and finds that the Jewish groups (Ashkenazi and non-Ashkenazi) share large swaths of DNA, indicating close relationships, and that each studied Jewish group (Iranian, Iraqi, Syrian, Italian, Turkish, Greek and Ashkenazi) has its own genetic signature but is more closely related to the other Jewish groups than to their fellow non-Jewish countrymen. Atzmon's team found that the SNP markers in genetic segments of 3 million DNA letters or longer were 10 times more likely to be identical among Jews than non-Jews. Results of the analysis also tally with biblical accounts of the fate of the Jews. The study also found that with respect to non-Jewish European groups, the population most closely related to Ashkenazi Jews are modern-day Italians. The study speculated that this similarity may be due to inter-marriage and conversions during the Roman Empire. It was also found that any two Ashkenazi Jewish participants shared about as much DNA as fourth or fifth cousins.

A 2010 study by Bray and co-authors, using SNP microarray techniques and linkage analysis, found that when assuming Druze and Palestinian Arab populations to represent the reference to world Jewry ancestor genome, 35% to 55% of the modern Ashkenazi genome may be of European origin, and that European "admixture is considerably higher than previous estimates by studies that used the Y chromosome" with this reference point. The authors interpreted this linkage disequilibrium in the Ashkenazi Jewish population as matching signs "of interbreeding or 'admixture' between Middle Eastern and European populations". On the Bray and co-authors tree, Ashkenazi Jews were found to be a genetically more divergent population than Russians, Orcadians, French, Basques, Sardinians, Italians and Tuscans. The study also observed that Ashkenazim are more diverse than their Middle Eastern relatives, which was counterintuitive because Ashkenazim are supposed to be a subset, not a superset, of their assumed geographical source population. Bray and co-authors therefore suggest that these results reflect a history of mixing between genetically distinct populations in Europe. However, it is possible that Ashkenazim's high heterozygocity was due to a relaxation of marriage prescription in their ancestors, while the low heterozygocity in the Middle East is due to maintenance of FBD marriage there. Therefore, Ashkenazim distinctiveness as found in the Bray and co-authors study may come from their ethnic endogamy (ethnic inbreeding), which allowed them to "mine" their ancestral gene pool in the context of relative reproductive isolation from European neighbors, and not from clan endogamy (clan inbreeding). Consequently, their higher diversity compared to Middle Easterners stems from the latter's marriage practices, not necessarily from the former's admixture with Europeans.

A 2010 genome-wide genetic study by Behar and co-authors examined the genetic relationships among all major Jewish groups, including Ashkenazim, and their genetic relationship with non-Jewish ethnic populations. It found that today's Jews (except Indian and Ethiopian Jews) are closely related to people from the Levant. The authors explained that "the most parsimonious explanation for these observations is a common genetic origin, which is consistent with an historical formulation of the Jewish people as descending from ancient Hebrew and Israelite residents of the Levant".

A 2017 autosomal study by Xue, Shai Carmi and co-authors found an admixture of Middle-Eastern and European ancestry in Ashkenazi Jews: with the European component comprising ≈50%–70% (estimated at "possibly 60%") and largely being of a southern European source and a minority eastern European, and the remainder (estimated at possibly ≈40%) being Middle Eastern ancestry showing the strongest affinity to Levantine populations such as the Druze and Lebanese. The study inferred an average admixture time of ~35 generations, with multiple lines of evidence indicating this reflects more than one event. The earlier, pre-bottleneck admixture was bounded between about 25–35 generations ago.

A 2018 study, referencing the popular theory of Ashkenazi Jewish (AJ) origins in "an initial settlement in Western Europe (Northern France and Germany), followed by migration to Poland and an expansion there and in the rest of Eastern Europe", tested "whether Ashkenazi Jews with recent origins in Eastern Europe are genetically distinct from Western European Ashkenazi". The study concluded that "Western AJ consist of two slightly distinct groups: one that descends from a subset of the original founders [who remained in Western Europe], and another that migrated there back from Eastern Europe, possibly after absorbing a limited degree of gene flow".

A 2022 study by Waldman et al. of genome data from the medieval Jewish cemetery of Erfurt found at least two related but genetically distinct Jewish groups: one closely related to Middle Eastern populations and especially similar to modern Ashkenazi Jews from France and Germany and modern Sephardic Jews from Turkey; the other group had a substantial contribution from Eastern European populations. But today Ashkenazi Jews from Eastern Europe no longer exhibit this genetic variability, and instead, their genomes resemble a nearly even mixture of the two Erfurt groups (with about 60% from the first group and 40% from the second).

=== The Khazar hypothesis ===
In the late 19th century, it was proposed that the core of Ashkenazi Jews were genetically descended from a hypothetical Khazarian Jewish diaspora who had migrated westward from modern Russia and Ukraine into modern France and Germany (as opposed to the currently held theory that Jews migrated from France and Germany into Eastern Europe). The hypothesis is not corroborated by historical sources, and is unsubstantiated by genetics, but it is still occasionally supported by scholars who have had some success in keeping the theory in the academic consciousness.

The theory has sometimes been used by Jewish authors such as Arthur Koestler as part of an argument against traditional forms of antisemitism (for example the claim that "the Jews killed Christ"), just as similar arguments have been advanced on behalf of the Crimean Karaites. Today, however, the theory is more often associated with antisemitism or anti-Zionism. Israeli historian and critic of Zionism Shlomo Sand, in his 2008 book The Invention of the Jewish People, mobilizes the hypothesis of significant Khazar ancestry among modern Ashkenazi Jews in his challenge of dominant concepts of Jewish peoplehood developed in Jewish historiography since the 19th century.

A 2013 trans-genome study carried out by 30 geneticists, from 13 universities and academies, from nine countries, assembling the largest data set available to date, for assessment of Ashkenazi Jewish genetic origins found no evidence of Khazar origin among Ashkenazi Jews and did find evidence of mixed European and Levantine origins. The authors concluded:

Thus, analysis of Ashkenazi Jews together with a large sample from the region of the Khazar Khaganate corroborates the earlier results that Ashkenazi Jews derive their ancestry primarily from populations of the Middle East and Europe, that they possess considerable shared ancestry with other Jewish populations, and that there is no indication of a significant genetic contribution either from within or from north of the Caucasus region.

The authors found Ashkenazi had the greatest affinity and shared ancestry firstly with other Jewish groups from southern Europe, Syria, and North Africa, and secondly with both southern Europeans (such as Italians) and modern Levantines (such as the Druze, Cypriots, Lebanese and Samaritans). The study found no affinity of Ashkenazim to northern Caucasus populations, and no more affinity to modern south Caucasus and eastern Anatolian populations (such as Armenians, Azerbaijanis, Georgians, and Turks) than found in other Jews or non-Jewish Middle Easterners (such as the Kurds, Iranians, Druze, and Lebanese).

=== East Asian ancestry ===
In addition to the genetic contributions from neighboring Europeans, Near Easterners, and North Africans, Ashkenazi Jews share some East Eurasian haplogroups, such as N9a, A, and M33c, with Chinese populations. This is believed to have originated from their economic and cultural exchanges along the Silk Road.

=== Medical genetics ===
There are many references to Ashkenazi Jews in the literature of medical and population genetics. Indeed, much awareness of "Ashkenazi Jews" as an ethnic group or category stems from the large number of genetic studies of disease, including many that are well reported in the media, that have been conducted among Jews. Jewish populations have been studied more thoroughly than most other human populations, for a variety of reasons:

- Jewish populations, and particularly the large Ashkenazi Jewish population, are ideal for such research studies, because they exhibit a high degree of endogamy, yet they are sizable.
- Jewish communities are comparatively well informed about genetics research, and have been supportive of community efforts to study and prevent genetic diseases.

The result is a form of ascertainment bias. This has sometimes created an impression that Jews are more susceptible to genetic disease than other populations. Healthcare professionals are often taught to consider those of Ashkenazi descent to be at increased risk for colon cancer. People of Ashkenazi descent are at much higher risk of being a carrier for Tay–Sachs disease, a genetic neurological disease that often results in death in early childhood.

Genetic counseling and genetic testing are often undertaken by couples where both partners are of Ashkenazi ancestry. Some organizations, most notably Dor Yeshorim, organize screening programs to prevent homozygosity for the genes that cause related diseases.

== See also ==
- Jewish ethnic divisions
- Ashkenazi Jews in Israel
- Gerim
- Ashkenazi Jewish cuisine
- Ashkenazi Jewish intelligence
