= Samuel Taitazak =

Greek rabbi

Samuel Taitazak (Hebrew: שמואל טאיטאצק) was a Talmudist who lived at Salonica in the 16th century. He was a member of the Taitazak family. He was the author of She'elot u-Teshubot, responsa, some of which have been included in Judah Taitazak's She'erit Yehudah and in Samuel de Medina's collection of responsa.

== Jewish Encyclopedia bibliography ==
- David Conforte, Ḳore ha-Dorot, p. 38a;
- Azulai, Shem ha-Gedolim, i. 88;
- Moritz Steinschneider, Cat. Bodl. Col. 2481.S
