= Jacob ben Samuel Taitazak =

Author

Jacob ben Samuel Taitazak (Hebrew: יעקב בן שמואל טאיטאצק) was a Talmudist of the 16th century, and an author of a responsum inserted in Samuel de Medina's collection entitled She'elot u-Teshubot MaHRaSHDaM (vol. iii., § 203, Salonica, 1598). He was a member of the Taitazak family.
