= Taitazak family =

The Taitazak family was a prominent family of Spanish Jews, several members of which distinguished themselves as Talmudic authorities. Various opinions have been expressed as to the origin of the name, the exact orthography and signification of which cannot be ascertained. After the expulsion from Spain in 1492 Solomon Taitazak, with his two sons Joseph and Judah, settled at Salonica, where members of the family subsequently became the leading spirits of the community.

== Notable people ==
- Joseph ben Solomon Taitazak
- Judah ben Solomon Taitazak
- Samuel Taitazak
- Jacob ben Samuel Taitazak
