= Isaac Adarbi =

Isaac Adarbi (1510? – 1584?) (also Adribi, Hebrew: יצחק בן שמואל אדרבי) was a casuist and preacher of the Shalom Congregation of Salonica during the 16th century. He was the pupil of Joseph Taitazak and the schoolmate of Samuel de Medina.

== Works ==
Adarbi wrote:

- Divrei Rivot (Polemics), consisting of four hundred and thirty responsa, which are interspersed with keen discussions on halakic problems occurring in the Talmud and its commentaries (Salonica, 1581; Venice, 1587; Sudilkov, 1833)
- Divrei Shalom (Words of Peace), containing thirty sermons preached on various occasions, as well as homiletic commentaries on the weekly lessons of the Pentateuch (Salonica, 1585). In these sermons he often reproduces observations made by his teacher Taitazak. A second edition was published by Eliezer ben Shabbethai, who added an index of the Biblical passages dealt with and some notes (Venice, 1586; ibid. 1587).
