= Shemaiah di Medina =

Shemaiah di Medina (Hebrew: שמעיה בן משה די מדינה; died June 3, 1648) was a Jewish scholar and liturgical poet.

He was born in Salonica, the son of Moses di Medina. A dispute with influential figures in the city compelled him to emigrated to Venice, where he became a respected member of the local rabbinate and continued his literary and scholarly work.

Shemaiah was the author of many liturgical poems. He wrote the treatise Ma'amar al 'Onshe Gehinnom ('A Treatise on the Punishments of Hell'), which was never published. Shemaiah also edited and wrote prefaces for Ben Shemuel, a collection of sermons by his grandfather Samuel di Medina, and Bene Shemuel, a work by Samuel Ḥayyun, another relative. A commentary on the Book of Proverbs has been attributed to him, though its authorship is uncertain.
