= Ibn Ezra =

Ibn Ezra was the name of a prominent Jewish family from Spain spanning many centuries.

The name ibn Ezra may refer to:

- Abraham ibn Ezra (1089–1167), Spanish rabbi, man of letters and writer
- Joseph ibn Ezra (16th–17th centuries), oriental rabbi and Talmudist
- Judah ben Joseph ibn Ezra (12th century), Spanish chamberlain of the king's court
- Moses ibn Ezra (11th-century–12th-century), Spanish rabbi, philosopher, linguist, and poet

== See also ==
- "Rabbi ben Ezra", a poem by Robert Browning about Abraham ibn Ezra (1092–1167) above
- Ben Ezra (disambiguation)
