= Joseph ibn Ezra =

Sephardi rabbi

Josef ben Isaac ibn Ezra was a Sephardic rabbi of the sixteenth and seventeenth centuries, descended from the Ibn Ezra family. Brought up in Salonica, he studied under Rabbi Samuel de Medina and became head of the Talmudic school there; among his pupils were Aaron Hazzan, Meir Melammed, and Shabbethai Jonah. Late in life he was a refugee in Constantinople, and then the rabbi of Sofia, where he died.

== Writings ==
Ibn Ezra was a Talmudist who wrote: Rosh Yosef, a commentary on the Turim, of which the part treating of communal taxes and contributions was published at Salonica (1601), under the title Massa Melekh; Atzamot Yosef, commentary on Kiddushin (ib. 1601; Berlin, 1699; Fürth, 1767). In the preface to the latter the author states that the object of the commentary is to give, in addition to the ordinary exposition of the text (peshat), a clear, insight into the methodology of the Talmud. He states further that the responsa of Joseph ibn Leb (1576), which reached him after he had finished his commentary, compelled him to make some changes therein. Appended to the work are the halachic decisions of the treatise in question with explanations of some difficult passages in various other treatises. Ibn Ezra also wrote: a commentary on Bava Metzia, mentioned in the Azamot Yosef; rules for the interpretation of the Talmud; responsa, some of which are found in the Atzamot Yosef, the responsa of Salomon ha-Kohen, Samuel de medinas Beno Shemuel, and the Shai la-Mora of Shabbethai Jonah.
