= Ben Ezra =

Ben Ezra or Benezra may refer to:

== People ==
- Adam Ben Ezra (born 1982), Israeli multi-instrumentalist, composer and educator
- Isaac ben Ezra, a tenth-century rabbi
- Sonia Benezra (born 1960), Canadian TV and radio interviewer, actress and media personality

== Places ==
- Ben Ezra Synagogue in Egypt

== See also ==
- "Rabbi ben Ezra", a poem by Robert Browning about Abraham ibn Ezra (1092–1167), one of the great poets, mathematicians, and scholars of the 12th century
- ibn Ezra (disambiguation), a prominent Jewish family from Spain spanning many centuries
