= Joseph Taitazak =

Joseph ben Solomon Ṭaiṭazaḳ (Hebrew: יוסף בן שלמה טאיטאצק), also referred to by the acronym MahaRITaTS, was a Talmudic authority and Kabbalist who lived at Salonica in the 15th and 16th centuries. He was a member of the Taitazak family.

In 1492, following the Expulsion of the Jews from Spain, he left Spain together with his father and his brother, Judah ben Solomon Taitazak, and settled in Salonica, where he became a rabbi.

== Life ==
He was regarded as one of the most mysterious Kabbalists of the 16th century and one of the leading rabbinical figures in Jerusalem and Damascus. He discussed magic squares, which allude to the highest and most concealed concepts and their use within amulets. Many references can be found in writings of contemporary and leading Kabbalists, such as Rabbi Joseph Tirshom's manuscript (ca. 1550 CE) Shoshan Yesod Olam (The Rose, Foundation of the Universe), Rabbi Eljah Baal Shem's Toledot Adam (Generation of Adam), and Rabbi Isaiah Horowitz's (1560-1630 CE) Sh'nei Luchot HaB'rit (Two Tablets of the Covenant) discuss the magic square in relation to the mysteries of creation.

He was a fervent adherent of the Kabbalah, in which he was well versed, and led an ascetic life. Eliyahu de Vidas related that with the exception of Sabbath nights, Joseph for forty years never slept in a bed, but on a box, with his feet on the ground.

With such a disposition to asceticism and mysticism, it was but natural that Joseph should become enthralled by the messianic vagaries of Solomon Molcho, whom he supported while preaching at Salonica in 1529. Rabbi Aryeh Kaplan writes, "Rabbi Joseph Taitazak was apparently influenced by Abulafia's school of Kabbalah, and many ideas that he discusses seem to be taken verbatim from Abulafia's writings."

Among Joseph's disciples were Isaac Adarbi, Samuel di Medina, and Shlomo Halevi Alkabetz.

== Works ==
He was the author of the following works:

- Ben Porat, a commentary on Ecclesiastes (Venice, 1599)
- Leḥem Setarim, on the Book of Daniel and the Five Scrolls (ib. 1608), and on Psalms, Job, and Proverbs (Neubauer, Cat. Bodl. Hebr. MSS. Nos. 206, 2; 329; 969; 2270, 8; 3521)
- A commentary on the Sayings of the Fathers
- Responsa, some of which have been included in the writings of his contemporaries and pupils
- Notes on casuistical matters
- Commentaries on haggadic passages
- A treatise on the astrolabe (Neubauer, l.c. Nos. 834, 7, 10; 2080, 3; 2254, 8).
- According to Isaac Adarbi (Dibre Ribot, p. 64), Joseph was the author also of novellæ on Alfasi.
