= Timeline of antisemitism in the 19th century =

This timeline of antisemitism chronicles the acts of antisemitism, hostile actions or discrimination against Jews as a religious or ethnic group, in the 19th century. It includes events in the history of antisemitic thought, actions taken to combat or relieve the effects of antisemitism, and events that affected the prevalence of antisemitism in later years. The history of antisemitism can be traced from ancient times to the present day.

Some authors prefer to use the terms anti-Judaism or religious antisemitism for religious sentiment against Judaism before the rise of racial antisemitism in the 19th century. For events specifically pertaining to the expulsion of Jews, see Jewish refugees.

== 1800s ==
1805, June 29
Two to five hundred Algerian Jews are massacred.
1806
Pillaging and Massacre of Jews in Tlemecen

== 1810s ==
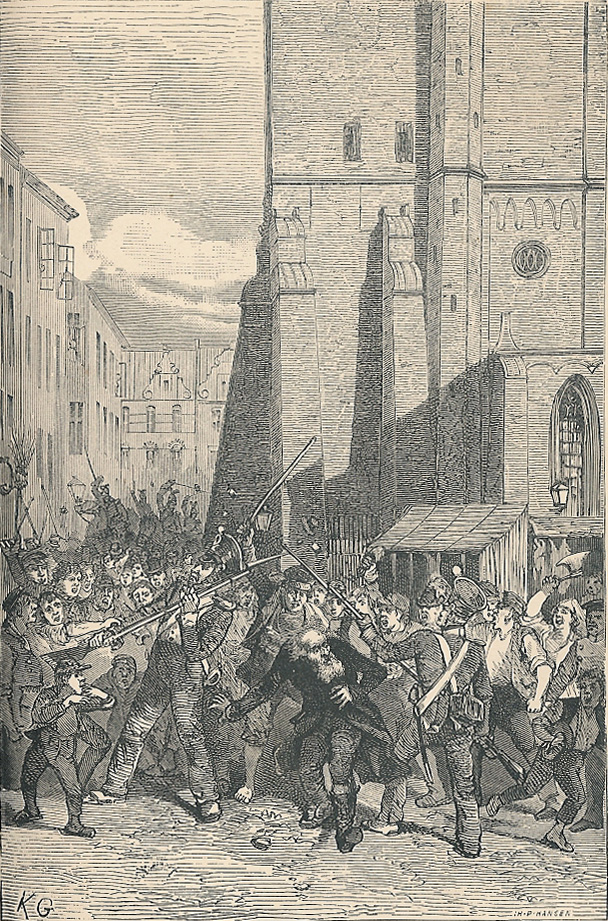
The anti-Jewish riots in Copenhagen, Denmark in September 1819

1811
Head of the Jewish community of Algiers David ben Joseph Coen Bakri is decapitated by the Dey Hadj Ali.
1815
Massacre of Jews in Algiers.
1815
Pope Pius VII reestablishes the ghetto in Rome after the defeat of Napoleon.
1818
Turks from Algiers attack Constantine, massacre and pillage Jewish homes, and abduct 17 young Jewish girls whom they bring to their commander.
1819
A series of anti-Jewish riots in Germany that spread to several neighboring countries: Denmark, Latvia and Bohemia known as Hep-Hep riots, from the derogatory rallying cry against the Jews in Germany.

== 1820s ==
1827
Compulsory military service for the Jews of Russia: Jewish boys under 18 years of age, known as the Cantonists, were placed in preparatory military training establishments for 25 years. In practice, Jewish children were often forcibly conscripted as young as eight or nine years old. Cantonists were encouraged and sometimes forced to baptize.
1829
The law in Canada requiring the oath "on my faith as a Christian" was amended in 1829 to provide for Jews to not take the oath.

== 1830s ==
1830
The Persian Jewish population of Tabriz, Iran is attacked by a mob, resulting in most of the Jewish community either being killed or fleeing.
1830
The Jews of Shiraz are forced to convert to Islam.
1831
The prominent French-Canadian politician Louis-Joseph Papineau sponsored a law which granted full equivalent political rights to Jews in Lower Canada, twenty-seven years before anywhere else in the British Empire.
1832
Partly because of the work of Ezekiel Hart, a law was passed that guaranteed Jews the same political rights and freedoms as Christians in Canada.
1833
Clemens Brentano published The Dolorous Passion of Our Lord Jesus Christ According to the Meditations of Anne Catherine Emmerich. The "Dolorous Passion" is claimed to reveal a "clear antisemitic strain throughout", with Brentano writing that Emmerich believed that "Jews ... strangled Christian children and used their blood for all sorts of suspicious and diabolical practices."
1834
The 1834 looting of Safed was a month-long attack on the Jewish population of Safed by local Arab and Druze villagers. It consisted of large scale looting, the killing and raping of Jews, and the destruction of many homes and synagogues. Before the attacks Jews made up over 50% of the population, but many of them fled to nearby cities which reduced their presence drastically.
1834
Jewish heroine and martyr Sol Hachuel is publicly decapitated at 17 years old in Fez, Morocco. She is executed for refusing to convert to Islam.
1835
Oppressive constitution for the Jews issued by Czar Nicholas I of Russia.
1838
The 1838 Druze attack on Safed was a plunder of the Jewish community of Safed by the local Druze during the Druze revolt.
1839
Forty-plus Persian Jews are killed and the entire Jewish community of Mashhad is forced to convert to Islam in the Allahdad. Many of them practised Judaism in secret, which led to the Mashhadi Jews, whom today number in the thousands.

== 1840s ==
1840
The Damascus affair: false blood libel accusations cause arrests and atrocities, culminating in the seizure of 63 Jewish children and attacks on Jewish communities throughout the Middle East.
1840
Blood Libel in Ottoman Southern Syria
1841
Mosul blood libel
1844
Karl Marx publishes his work On the Jewish Question: "What is the worldly cult of the Jew? Huckstering. What is his worldly god? Money... Money is the jealous God of Israel, besides which no other god may exist... The god of the Jews has been secularized and has become the god of this world", "In the final analysis, the emancipation of the Jews is the emancipation of mankind from Judaism."
1844
Muslims accuse jews of murdering a Christian for his blood in Cairo
1847
Maronites in the lebanese village of Dayr al-Qamar raised a blood Libel, that jews were murdering Christians for their blood.

== 1850s ==
1850
Das Judenthum in der Musik (German for "Jewishness in Music", but normally translated Judaism in Music; spelled after its first publications, according to modern German spelling practice, as 'Judentum'), is an essay by Richard Wagner which attacks Jews in general and the composers Giacomo Meyerbeer and Felix Mendelssohn in particular. It was published under a pseudonym in the Neue Zeitschrift für Musik (NZM) of Leipzig in September 1850 and was reissued in a greatly expanded version under Wagner's name in 1869. It is regarded by some as an important landmark in the history of German antisemitism.
1853
Blood libels in Saratov and throughout Russia.
1858
Edgardo Mortara, a six-year-old Jewish boy whom a maid had baptized during an illness, is taken from his parents in Bologna, an episode which aroused universal indignation in liberal circles.

== 1860s ==
1860
The Jews of Hamadan are accused of mocking the Ta'zieh ceremonies for Imam Husain, several of them are fined and some have their ears and noses cut off as punishment.
1860
Blood libel against jews of Aleppo raised by Christians
1862
During the American Civil War General Grant issues General Order No. 11, ordering all Jews out of his military district, suspecting them of pro-Confederate sympathy. President Lincoln directs him to rescind the order. Polish Jews are given equal rights. Old privileges forbidding Jews to settle in some Polish cities are abolished.
1863
A Jew in Hamadan is lynched by a Muslim mob, and many others are severely injured after being accused of insulting Muhammad.
1864
At least 500 Moroccan Jews are massacred in Marrakesh and Fez.
1866
The Jews of Barforush are forcibly converted to Islam. When they are allowed to revert to Judaism thanks to French and British ambassadors, a Muslim mob kills 18 Jews, burning two of them alive.
1868
Samuel Bierfield (d. 15 August 1868) is believed to be the first Jew lynched in the United States. Bierfield and his African-American clerk, Lawrence Bowman, were apprehended in Bierfield's store in Franklin, Tennessee and fatally shot by a group of masked men believed to belong to the Ku Klux Klan, on 15 August 1868. No one was ever convicted of the crime, however.
1869
On Jerba Island, 18 Tunisian Jews are killed in a pogrom and an Arab mob loots Jewish homes and stores, as well as burn synagogues.

== 1870s ==
1870
The 35,000 Jews living in Algeria are granted French citizenship as a result of the Crémieux Decree. This leads to a rise of antisemitism in Algeria and across the Middle East.
1871
A telegram found in Odesa contains information of a Plot to murder Jews. "The Russian citizens determined to get rid the Jews at one blow, and formed a plot to massacre them".
1871
Speech of Pope Pius IX in regard to Jews: "of these dogs, there are too many of them at present in Rome, and we hear them howling in the streets, and they are disturbing us in all places."
1873
The Southern Baptist Convention passed a "Resolution On Anti-Semitism" stating, "RESOLVED, That we do gratefully remember this day our unspeakable indebtedness to the seed of Abraham, and devoutly recognize their peculiar claims upon the sympathies and prayers of all Gentile Christians, and we hereby record our earnest desire to partake in the glorious work of hastening the day when the superscription of the Cross shall be the confession of all Israel 'Jesus of Nazareth, the King of the Jews'."
1875
Twenty Jews are killed by a Muslim mob in Demnate, Morocco.
1877
Massacre of two Jewish families in Larache
1878
Adolf Stoecker, German antisemitic preacher and politician, founds the Christian Social Party, which marks the beginning of the political antisemitic movement in Germany.
1879
Nine Jews in Kutaisi are accused of ritual murder, eventually being tried and found not guilty.
1879
Heinrich von Treitschke, German historian and politician, justifies the antisemitic campaigns in Germany, bringing antisemitism into learned circles.
1879
Wilhelm Marr coins the term Anti-Semitism to distinguish himself from religious Anti-Judaism.

== 1880s ==
1881
Pogrom against the Jews in Tlemcen, Algeria.
1881
The German Reichstag receives and rejects a petition with more than 250,000 signatures, and supported by the Kaiser's personal chaplain, Adolf Stoecker, calling for the removal of Jews from public life.
1881
Georg Ritter von Schönerer, a pan-German Austrian leader and antisemite styles himself as "Führer" and he and his followers use the greeting "Heil!"
1881–1884
Pogroms sweep southern Russia, propelling mass Jewish emigration from the Pale of Settlement: about 2 million Russian Jews emigrated in period 1880–1924, many of them to the United States (until the National Origins Quota of 1924 and Immigration Act of 1924 largely halted immigration to the U.S. from Eastern Europe and Russia). The Russian word "pogrom" becomes international.
1881
The Massacre of Alexandria, Egypt. A Christian child disappeared, the Jews were blamed and attacked.
1882
Jewish population of Algiers is attacked by a Muslim mob.
1882
The Tiszaeszlár blood libel in Hungary arouses public opinion throughout Europe.
1882
The International Anti-Jewish Congress, led by Adolf Stoecker, convenes at Dresden, Germany; it appeals to "the Government and Peoples of Christian Nations Threatened by Judaism" to expel "the Semitic race of Jews" from Europe.
1882
A series of "temporary laws" by Tsar Alexander III of Russia (the May Laws), which adopted a systematic policy of discrimination, with the object of removing the Jews from their economic and public positions, in order to "cause one-third of the Jews to emigrate, one-third to accept baptism and one-third to starve" (according to a remark attributed to Konstantin Pobedonostsev)
1886
Jews are attacked by Arabs in Petah Tikva
1887
Russia introduces measures to limit Jews access to education, known as the quota.
1891
Blood libel in Xanten, Germany.

== 1890s ==
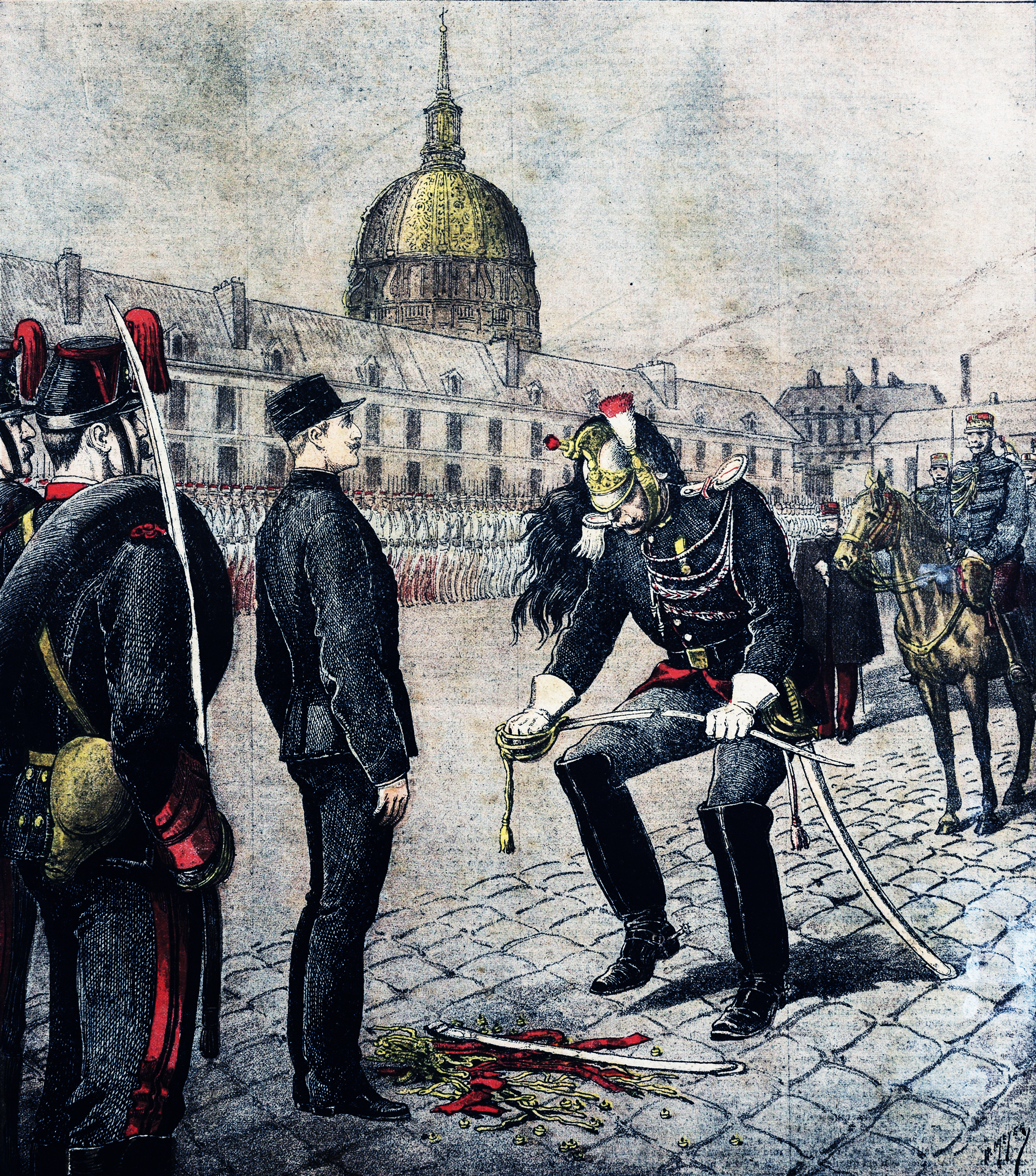
5 January 1895: The treason conviction of Captain Alfred Dreyfus

1891
Expulsion of 20,000 Jews from Moscow, Russia. The Congress of the United States eases immigration restrictions for Jews from the Russian Empire. (Weber-Kempster report)
1891
Leading Muslims in Jerusalem asked the Ottoman authorities in Constantinople to prohibit the entry of Jews arriving from Russia.
1891
Blood libels in Corfu and Zakynthos last several weeks; several Jews murdered.
1892
Mulla Abdullah issues a fatwa to kill all the Jews of Hamadan if they refuse to abide by Jewish restrictions. The local Persian Jews were later ordered to become Muslims or face death.
1892
Two Persian Jews go out to sell merchandise and end up killed with all of their property stolen. Their relatives went out to search for the bodies and when they found them, they were killed by the same villagers. Even after many attempts to plea for their lives, the governor of Savojbolagh County paid them no mind.
1892
Justinas Bonaventure Pranaitis writes The Talmud Unmasked an antisemitic and inaccurate anti-Talmudic work.
1893
Karl Lueger establishes antisemitic Christian Social Party and becomes the Mayor of Vienna in 1897.
1894
The Dreyfus affair in France. In 1898 Émile Zola publishes open letter J'accuse!
1895
A. C. Cuza organizes the Alliance Anti-semitique Universelle in Bucharest, Romania.
1895
Captain Alfred Dreyfus being dishonorably discharged in France.
1897
Synagogues and Jewish homes are pillaged in Oran.
1897
Synagogues are ransacked and Jews are murdered in Tripolitania.
1898
Violent anti-Jewish riots erupt in Algiers.
1899
Houston Stewart Chamberlain, racist and antisemitic author, publishes his Die Grundlagen des 19 Jahrhunderts which later became a basis of National-Socialist ideology.
1899
Blood libel in Bohemia (the Hilsner case).

== See also ==
- Timeline of anti-Zionism
