= David ben Joseph Coen Bakri =

Jewish Algerian financier (c. 1770 – 1811)

David ben Joseph Coen Bakri (born about 1770 - died 4 February 1811) was a financier and chief of the Algerian Jews.

His financial abilities placed him early at the head of the important firm "Bakri Brothers", founded by his father. In 1797, Bakri married Aziza, a niece of Naphtali Busnash, who at that time became a partner in the firm, which then assumed the name "Bakri Busnash". Supported by the regency (needs source) the company expanded its business at sea, and many European governments entrusted them with the management of their Algerian money affairs. During the dearth of food in France they supplied the latter with a considerable quantity of wheat on credit; and on their advice, the Dey authorized a loan to the French Directory of five million francs, the credit for which was eventually transferred to them.

The settlement of this loan brought about thirty years later the definitive rupture between the regency and France, and, finally, the conquest of Algeria by the French. On the assassination of Busnash and the anti-Jewish riots which followed it, the firm "Bakri Busnash" became insolvent; and Bakri himself was thrown into prison under the pretext that the firm owed the regency a sum of five million francs. Set free on a promise to pay the alleged debt, he soon built up the firm "Bakri," owing to the help he received from several European governments for the services he had rendered them. He even succeeded in winning the confidence of the new Dey, who appointed him in 1806 chief of the Algerian Jews. This post proved fatal to him. His irreconcilable enemy, David Duran, who coveted this office, is thought to have undermined Bakri's position. The latter was accused of high treason and decapitated.
