= Judah ben Solomon Taitazak =

Judah ben Solomon Taitazak (Hebrew: יהודה בן שלמה טאיטאצק) was a Talmudist who lived at Salonica in the 15th and 16th centuries. He was the brother of Joseph ben Solomon and a member of the Taitazak family. He was the author of She'erit Yehudah (Salonica, 1599–1600), commentating and supplementing Joseph Caro's Bet Yosef, on the second volume of the Ṭurim.

== Jewish Encyclopedia bibliography ==
- David Conforte, Ḳore ha-Dorot, p. 34b;
- Moritz Steinschneider, Cat. Bodl. col. 1373.
