= Samuel de Medina =

Talmudist and author (1505–1589)

Rabbi Samuel ben Moses de Medina (abbreviated RaShDaM, Hebrew: רשד"ם or Maharashdam; 1505 – October 12, 1589) was a Talmudist and author from Thessaloniki. He was principal of the Talmudic academy of that city, which produced a great number of prominent scholars during the 16th and 17th centuries. His teachers were the noted Talmudists Joseph Taitazak and Levi Ibn Chaviv, and among his schoolmates were Isaac Adarbi, Joseph ibn Leb, and Moses Almosnino. While on a mission to Constantinople he met the noted grammarian Menahem Lonzano, who studied under him for some time and who therefore speaks of him as his teacher.

Among Samuel's many disciples who attained prominence were Abraham de Boton, Joseph ibn Ezra and Ḥayyim Shabbethai. He had a controversy with Joseph Karo and other rabbis at Safed, against whom he wrote a polemical letter (Ketav Tochachah). He died at Salonica. A grandson of his was Samuel Hayyun, author of Bene Shemuel, novellae and responsa (Salonica, c. 1613).

== Writings ==
Samuel's works include:

- Ben Shemuel, Mantua, 1622, thirty sermons on various subjects, published with a preface by his grandson Shemaiah
- Hiddushim (unpublished), novellae on some Talmudic tractates
- a collection of 956 responsa in four parts, of which the first two were published during the lifetime of the author (1578-87?) under the title Piskei RaShDaM.

A complete edition of the last-named work was undertaken later by the author's son Moses, who added a preface.

== Legacy ==
De Medina is considered one of the most influential halakhic authorities of Sephardic Judaism after the expulsion from Spain. His responsa continue to be cited in contemporary Jewish legal discussions. Among his most notable works is the She'elot u-Teshuvot (Questions and Answers), a collection of legal rulings addressing a wide range of halakhic topics. His approach combines profound Talmudic knowledge with practical sensitivity to the needs of exiled Sephardic communities. He died in Salonica in 1589.
