= Alois Kaiser =

American singer

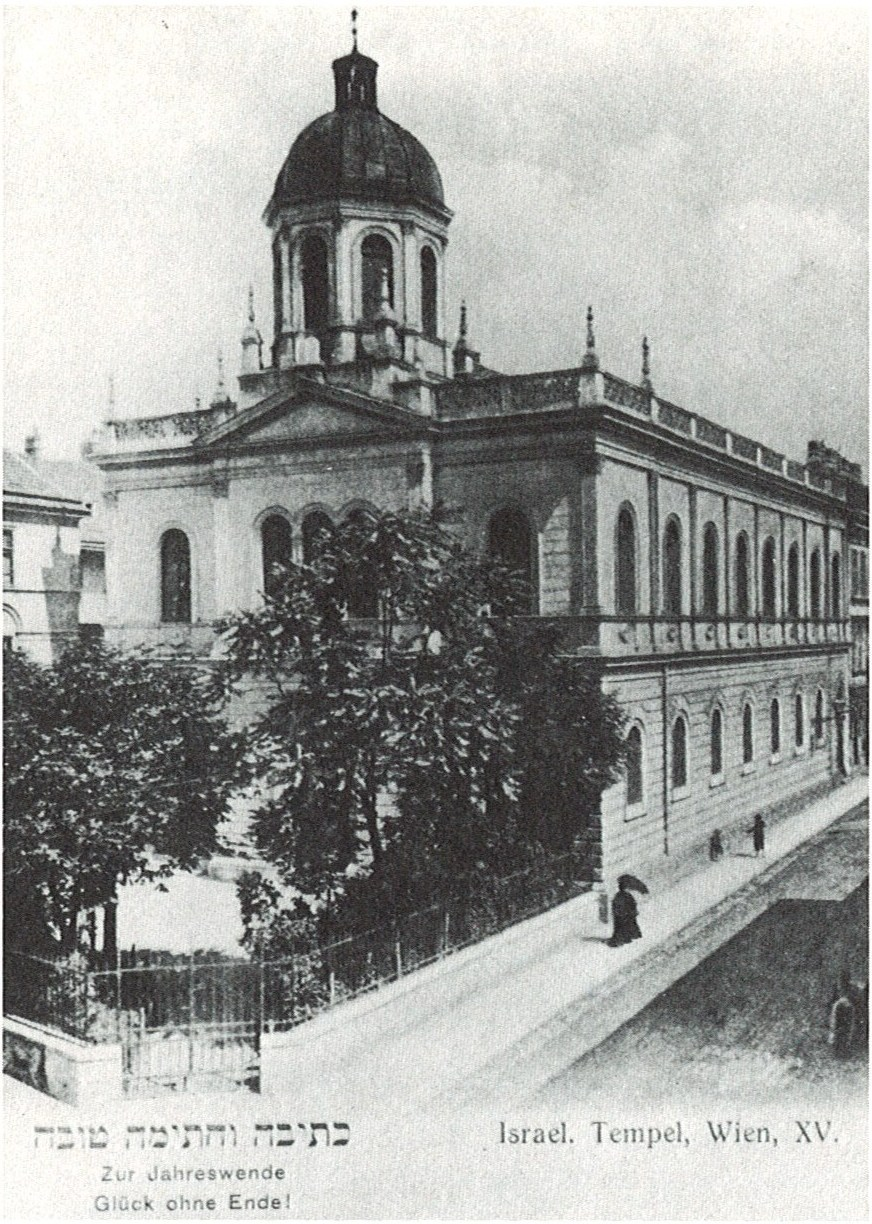
Turnertempel (de), the synagoge at the Turnergasse, Fünfhaus

Alois Kaiser (November 10, 1840 - 1908) was an American chazzan and composer, considered to be the founder of the American cantorate.

Kaiser was born in Szobotist (Slovak: Sobotište), Hungary. He received his early education in the religious school of the Vienna congregation under Dr. Henry Zirndorf, and then studied at the Realschule and the Teachers' Seminary and Conservatory of Music in Vienna. From the age of 10, he sang in the choir of Salomon Sulzer, and in 1859, became an assistant cantor in Fünfhaus, one of the suburbs of Vienna (now a part of Rudolfsheim-Fünfhaus, the 15th Viennese district). From 1863 to 1866, he was cantor at the Maisel Synagogue at Prague.

Kaiser arrived in New York City in June 1866, and in the following month was appointed cantor of the Oheb Shalom congregation in Baltimore, Maryland. He was for several years president of the Society of American Cantors. From 1895, he was an honorary member of the Central Conference of American Rabbis, which in 1892 entrusted him and William Sparger with the compilation of the musical portion of a Union Hymnal, published in 1897.

With Samuel Weltsch, Moritz (Morris) Goldstein, and J. L. Rice, Kaiser published the "Zimrat Yah" (1871–86, 4 vols. ), containing music for Shabbats and festivals. Of his other compositions may be mentioned:

- "Confirmation Hymns" (1873)
- "Memorial Service for the Day of Atonement" (1879)
- "Cantata for Simchat Torah" (1890, with William Sparger; preface by Cyrus Adler)
- "Souvenir of the Jewish Women’s Congress at the World's Columbian Exposition" (1893)

Kaiser died in Baltimore on January 6, 1908.
