= Isaak Markus Jost =

German historian (1793–1860)

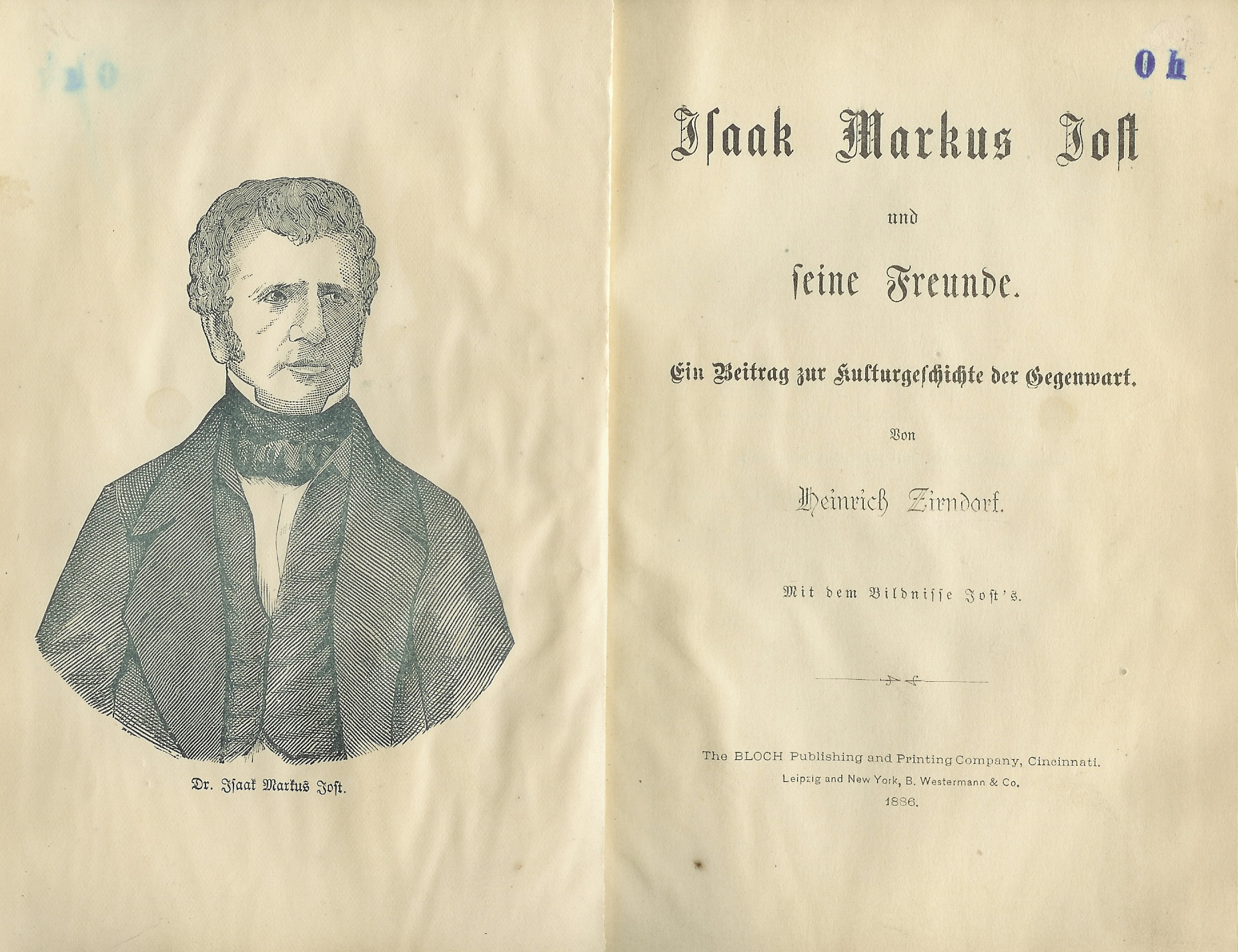
Title page of a biography of Isaak Markus Jost by Heinrich Zirndorf

Isaak Marcus (Markus) Jost (February 22, 1793, Bernburg – November 22, 1860, Frankfurt am Main) was a Jewish historical writer.

He studied at the universities of Göttingen and Berlin. In Berlin he began to teach, and in 1835 received the appointment of upper master in the Jewish commercial school (called the Philanthropin) at Frankfort-on-the-Main. Here he remained until his death, on November 22, 1860. The work by which he is chiefly known is Geschichte der Israeliten seit den Zeit der Maccabaer ('A History of the Israelites from the Time of the Maccabees to Our Time'), in 9 volumes (1820–1829). This work was afterwards supplemented by Neuere Geschichte den Israeliten von 1815–1845 (1846–1847), and Geschichte des Judenthums und seiner Sekten (1857–1859). He also published an abridgment under the title Allgemeine Geschichte des israelitischen Volkes (1831–1832), and an edition of the Mishna with a German translation and notes (6 volumes, 1832–1834). Between 1839 and 1841 he edited the Israelitische Annalen, and he contributed extensively to periodicals.

== Biography ==
Jost was one of a poor family of eleven, most of whom died in infancy; and when his father became blind, the duty of guiding him fell upon Isaac. At the age of ten he lost his father and was taken to Wolfenbüttel; there he attended the Samsonschule, which at that time was conducted in the style of an old-fashioned cheder. This condition improved, however, when Samuel Mayer Ehrenberg took charge of the school in 1807; under him Jost began to study the German language. An intimate friendship connected him with Leopold Zunz, who was also a pupil in that school, and together they prepared themselves for the entrance examination of the gymnasium. Jost entered the gymnasium at Brunswick, supporting himself during the years 1809-13 as a tutor in the family of one of the trustees of the Samsonschule; then, supported by Israel Jacobson, he entered the University of Göttingen, removing a year later to that of Berlin. He graduated in 1816, and took up the profession of teaching, refusing an offer of Jacobson, who wished him to become a preacher; for Jost believed that the task of modern Judaism lay not in any reform of the services, but rather in an improvement of education. His first charge was the Bock school, where, in accordance with the system then advocated by Jewish and Christian humanitarians, Jewish and Christian pupils were educated together. In 1819, however, the reactionary government of Prussia prohibited the reception of Christian children; this severely injured the school, as a great many Jewish parents had sent their children to it solely because they desired them to come into contact with Christians. Nevertheless, Jost remained at his post until 1835, when he was called to Frankfort-on-the-Main as teacher in the "Philanthropin," which position he held up to his death.

== Literary activity ==
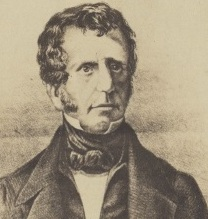
Jost, Anton Goldschmidt, Shavadron collection of the National Library of Israel

Having himself suffered from the lack of system that characterized the yeshiva, Jost took the greatest interest in pedagogics, and his earliest literary work was devoted to the writing of textbooks, among which may be mentioned a grammar of the English language (Lehrbuch der Englischen Sprache), which went through three editions (Berlin, 1826, 1832, and 1843), and a dictionary to Shakespeare's plays (Berlin, 1830). He wrote also Theoretisch-Praktisches Handbuch zum Unterricht im Deutschen Stil (Berlin, 1835; the title of the second edition was Lehrbuch des Hochdeutschen Ausdruckes in Wort und Schrift, published in 1852). To the same class belongs his Biblical history, Neue Jugendbibel, Enthaltend die Religiösen und Geschichtlichen Urkunden der Hebräer, mit Sorgfältiger Auswahl für die Jugend Uebersetzt und Erläutert: Erster Theil, die Fünf Bücher Mosis (Berlin, 1823).

In spite of his duties as a teacher and of his varied interests, Jost never neglected Jewish literature, especially Jewish history. His first work in this line was Geschichte der Israeliten Seit der Zeit der Makkabäer bis auf Unsere Tage (9 volumes, Berlin, 1820–28), which was followed by a small compendium under the title Geschichte des Israelitischen Volkes ... für Wissenschaftlich-Gebildete Leser (2 volumes, Berlin, 1832). This work, which ended with the Napoleonic era, was continued in his Neuere Geschichte der Israeliten (Berlin, 1846–47), bringing it down to the date of its publication. Toward the end of his life he wrote another historical work, Geschichte des Judenthums und Seiner Sekten (3 volumes, Leipzig, 1857–59), which deals with the whole of Jewish history down to 1858. Of other literary works of Jewish interest his edition of the Mishnah with vocalized text, German translation in Hebrew characters, and Hebrew commentary, deserves special mention (6 volumes, Berlin, 1832–36).

Jost appeared repeatedly as an apologist of Judaism against political reactionaries and detractors of rabbinical literature; his Was Hat Herr Chiarini in Angelegenheit der Europäischen Juden Geleistet? (Berlin, 1830) was directed against Abbé Chiarini's "Théorie du Judaïsme"; and his Offenes Sendschreiben an den Geheimen Oberregierungsrath Streckfuss (Berlin, 1833), against Streckfuss' "Verhältnis der Juden zu den Christlichen Staaten." When in the beginning of the reign of Frederick William IV of Prussia the rumor was spread that the king contemplated an alteration of the legal position of the Jews in a reactionary sense, Jost wrote Legislative Fragen Betreffend die Juden im Preussischen Staate (Berlin, 1842) and Nachträge zu den Legislativen Fragen (Berlin 1842). Between 1839 and 1841 he edited the Israelitische Annalen, a weekly chiefly devoted to the collection of historical material, and between 1841 and 1842 the Hebrew periodical Zion (in collaboration with his friend and colleague Michael Creizenach). He was also a frequent contributor to the Jewish press, to almanacs, and to year-books.

== As historian ==
In Jewish historiography, Jacques Basnage was an important predecessor to Jost. The religious history of the chroniclers is considered unsystematic and uncritical. With the appearance of Zunz's monographs and the numerous similar works, published either independently or in magazines, the work of Jost should soon become antiquated. He recognized this himself at the end of his life by taking up the work again. Another shortcoming is his rationalistic attitude toward the narratives in Talmudic sources, which leads him to see in many of the Talmudic authors shrewd impostors who played on the credulity of their contemporaries by feigning miracles (see his presentation of Eliezer ben Hurcanus in his Allgemeine Geschischte, ii. 108). His earlier works lack to a great extent the strictly historical interest, and evidence too much of Jewish sentiment (Allgemeine Geschichte ii. 387). His rationalism is found also in the bitterness with which he speaks of Judæo-German ("Jahrbuch," ii. 43). His best work is in the presentation of modern Jewish history, in which he is singularly exact and conscientious, and to which he gives an exhaustive literature of sources; here he exhibits not only a fine discernment of what is historically important, but a spirit of fairness which is the more creditable because he wrote in the midst of the struggle for Reform.

Jost endeavors to do justice to Samson R. Hirsch's mysticism as well as to Aaron Chorin's rationalism; he recognizes the importance of M. A. Günzburg and of Isaac Bär Lewinsohn, while Grätz, who wrote on this period a quarter of a century later, ignores Günzburg and Lewinsohn and speaks of Chorin with the bitterness of a partisan. It is undoubtedly due to that impartiality that Jost's work suffered by comparison with the warm Jewish spirit which permeates Grätz's work (see Grätz, "Gesch." xi. 456).

Unlike Zunz, Jost has an anti-rabbinical stance, and sought to free Jewish history from Christian theology. He saw influence from Greco-Roman law and philosophy in Jewish philosophy, and sought to secularize Jewish history.

== His personality ==
While not a man of public life, Jost devoted himself to the cause of orphans, and to his initiative was due the establishment in Frankfort-on-the-Main of a girls' orphan asylum (1853). He was instrumental also in founding a society (Permissionistenverein, 1843) for the aid of those who, according to the law then in existence, had no claim on the Frankfort charitable institutions, not being freemen of the city; he founded the Creizenach Stiftung, for the aid of aged teachers and their families (1842), and he often assisted young students and poor authors with both advice and influence. He was also a member of the Society for the Culture and Science of the Jews (Verein für Kultur und Wissenschaft der Juden) alongside Joel Abraham List, Leopold Zunz, and Eduard Gans. While advanced in his views, he was indifferent to Reform, and for years never attended a religious service (Zirndorf, Isaak Markus Jost und Seine Freunde, p. 130). He married in 1816 a Miss Wolf, niece of Isaac Euchel. She died in 1842. He devoted himself with paternal affection to the pupils of the orphan asylum, whom he liked to call his children.
