= Aghion =

Aghion is a Sephardic Jewish surname.

== Origin ==
According to the website of Anu – Museum of the Jewish People, "Aghion" or "Agion" is the transliteration of the Greek word for "holy", and is considered to be the equivalent of the Hebrew name "Kadosh".

Israeli scholar Meir Benayahu wrote in the 1970s in the journal Sefunot that the name goes back to the Jews of the medieval Spanish village of Ayllón, located one hundred and forty kilometres (c. 90 miles) north of Madrid, on the route to France. They were expelled from Spain in 1492, and for centuries used the name of the village they had been forced to leave. With time the name took a number of new forms, evolving from Ayllón to Aelyon, Aelion, and Aghion. Benayahu considered it probable that they were all part of one extended family.

Investigations made by the family led to the conclusion that after 1492, their forebears settled in Thessaloniki (back then part of the Ottoman Empire, now in Greece), later moving to Amsterdam and, from 1775, the majority of them lived in Ottoman Egypt. The 1948 establishment of Israel led to a new exodus in the 1950s, spreading the family across a dozen countries around the world.

The Jewish community of modern Egypt enjoyed a period of particular growth from the mid-19th century to the 1950s, flourishing during that century. Among the Sephardic Jews who prospered in Alexandria during those years was Edward Aghion, whose Jerusalem villa, Beit Aghion, eventually became the official residence of the Israeli prime minister.

== Notable people bearing the surname ==
- Anne Aghion (born 1960), French-American documentary filmmaker
- Edward Aghion (1883-1956), Jewish businessman from Egypt, later in Israel; Beit Aghion, the official residence of the Prime Minister of Israel, is named for him.
- Gabriel Aghion (born 1955), French film director
- Gaby Aghion (born 1921), French fashion designer
- Philippe Aghion (born 1956), French economist and Nobel Prize winner; son of Gaby
