= Joel Abraham List =

Joel Abraham List (1780–1848) was one of the seven founding members of the Society for the Culture and Science of the Jews (Verein für Kultur und Wissenschaft der Juden); he served as its president from March 1820 to March 1821. He was also the founder and director of a private elementary school for Jews. Other notable members of the Society are Joseph Hilmar, Isaac Levin Auerbach, Isaac Marcus Jost, Leopold Zunz, Eduard Gans, and Moses Moser. They worked for the improvement of the situation of the Jews in the German federated states; the members shared a hostility to rabbinism, or the dominance of talmudic Judaism in Jewish Life.

== Sources ==
- J. A. List, Unpublished Lecture of November 7, 1819, in Siegfried Ucko, "Geistesgeschichtliche Grundlagen der Wissenschaft des Judentums," Zeitschrift für Geschichte der Juden in Deutschland 5 (1935), pp1–35. Trans. by J. Hessing and P. Mendes-Flohr
