= Josef Goldstein =

Austro-Hungarian contor and composer

Josef Goldstein (27 March 1836 – 17 June 1899) was an Austro-Hungarian cantor and composer. He was chief cantor at the Leopoldstädter Tempel in Vienna, Austria from 1857 until his death.

== Biography ==
He was born to Samuel and Maria Goldstein (née Hacker) in Kecskemét, Hungary. His father was chorister with Dovidl Brod Strelisker (1783-1848) at Pest [1] and later cantor at Kecskemét and then at Neutra, Hungary (now Nitra, Slovakia). Upon his father's death in about 1848, Josef, aged about 12, was so well acquainted with the liturgy and possessed such an exceptional tenor voice that the congregation of Neutra elected him as his father's successor. He remained there for two years and then undertook a four year tour through Austria and Germany, officiating in some of their largest congregations.

Upon his return to Hungary, an admirer of his voice sent him to Vienna to be educated for the operatic stage. He received this training from Salvatore Marchesi, husband of the voice teacher Mathilde Marchesi. On the completion of his training and while en route to his first engagement in Italy, he decided to return to the position of cantor and received an appointment at the newly built Leopoldstädter Tempel in Vienna in 1857.

His published works include the three volume "Schire Jeschurun, Gesänge der Israeliten;" a collection of songs for the Sabbath and festivals (1862), "Psalmen und Choralgesänge;" psalms and choral songs (1872), and "Requiem für Cantor-Solo und gemischtem Chor mit Orgel-oder harmonium-Begleitung" (1892).

== Family ==
He had six children with his wife Katharina (née Heim); Pauline (1862-1942), Sidonie (born 1863), Bertha (1864-1942), twins Arnold (1866-1942) and Emil (1866-1944) Golz, and Irma Golz (1872-1903). Pauline, Bertha and Arnold all perished at the Theresienstadt concentration camp.

Arnold and Emil Golz wrote libretti for operettas and burlesques performed on the Viennese stage. These included Die Gaukler (The Juggler, 1909), Die Königin der Nacht (The Queen of the Night, 1913), Die Unsterbliche Familie (The Immortal Family, 1913), Die Schöne Ehebrecherin (The Beautiful Adulteress, 1913), Die Meerjungfrau (The Mermaid, 1916), Baron Menelaus (1919), Mamselle Napoleon (1919), Die Fromme Helene (Pious Helene, 1921) Epsteins Witwe (Epstein's Widow, 1923), Der Ledige Schwiegersohn (The Unmarried Son-in-law, 1923), Frau Pick in Audienz (Mrs. Pick in Audience, 1924), Der Autowildling (1925), Hulda Pessl in Venedig (Hulda Pessl in Venice, 1926), Villa Adelheid (1926), Die Königin-Mutter (The Queen Mother, 1930), Der Jolly Joker (1932), Die Expresshochzeit (The Express Wedding), Der Held ihrer Träum (The Hero of her Dreams), Der Unwiderstehliche Kassian (The Irresistible Kassian), Baronin Fritzi (Baroness Fritzi), Wo die Liebe Blüht (Where Love Blooms), and Der Geldbriefträger (The Money Order Worker).

Irma Golz was a Viennese soprano who gained notoriety as an opera singer until her untimely death at the age of 30 to leukemia.

Josef's brother Moritz (Morris) Goldstein (1840-1906) was cantor at the K. K. Bene Israel Synagogue in Cincinnati, Ohio from 1881 until his death. Morris composed and compiled music for use in American synagogues. In collaboration with Alois Kaiser, Samuel Welsh and I. L. Rice he published "Zimrath Yah: Liturgic songs consisting of Hebrew, English and German psalms and hymns systematically arranged for the Jewish rite with organ accompaniment" (1873). He also published "Kol Zimroh: A hymn book for temples and Sabbath schools and adapted for choirs and congregational singing" (1885) and "The Temple Service: Containing all the music required for the Union Prayer Book for Jewish worship" (1895). Morris was a maternal great-grandfather of conductor James Levine.
