= Yad Ben Zvi =

Israeli research institute

Yad Ben-Zvi
- יד יצחק בן־צבי
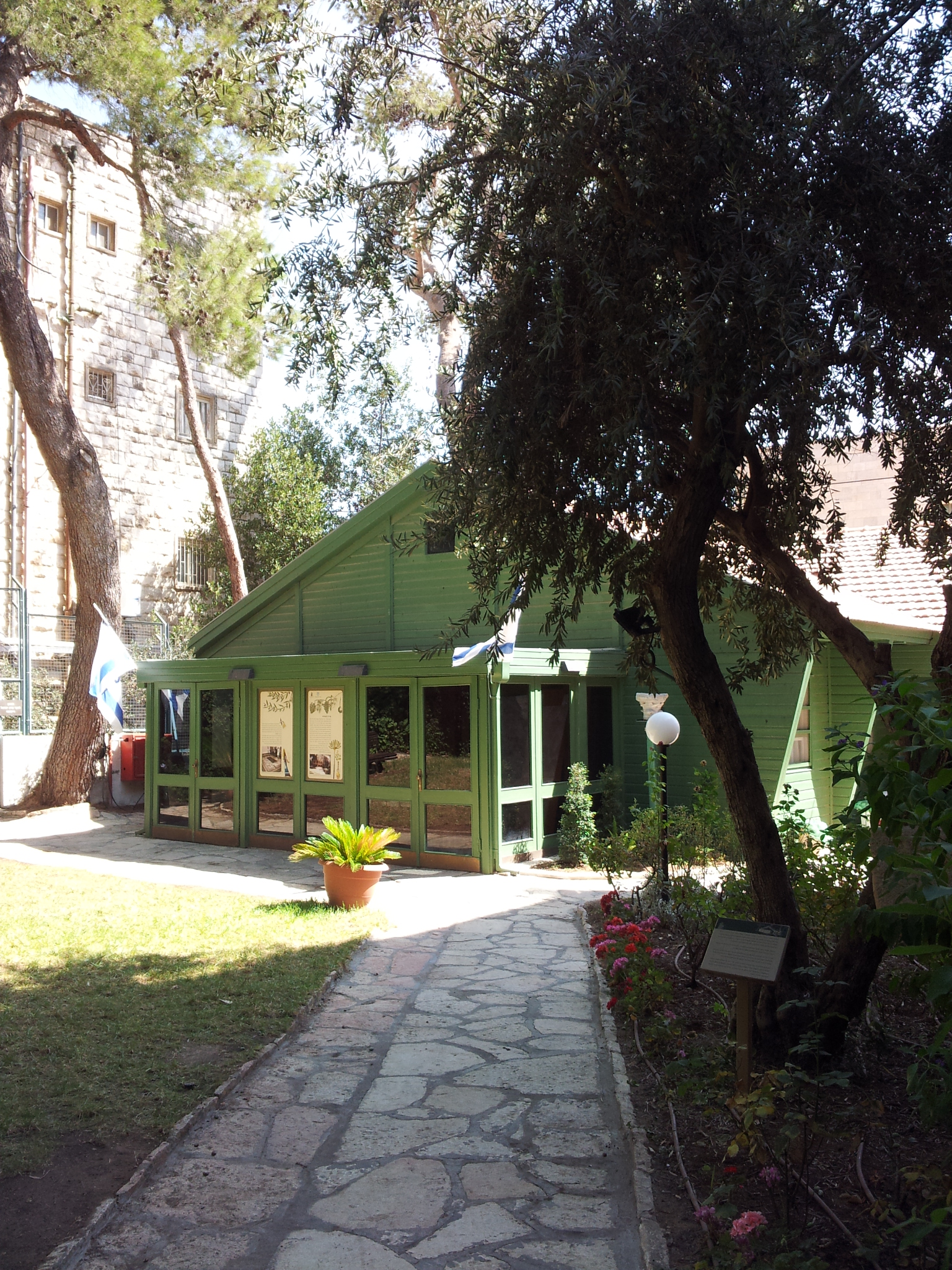
- Yad Ben-Zvi cabin, historic home of Yitzhak and Rachel Ben-Zvi
- Formation: 1947
- Founder: Yitzhak Ben-Zvi
- Type: Research institute and publishing house
- Purpose: Research and education on Jewish history and culture
- Headquarters: Jerusalem
- Website: www.ybz.org.il

Yad Ben Zvi (Hebrew: יד יצחק בן־צבי), also known as the Ben-Zvi Institute, is a research institute and publishing house named for Israeli president Yitzhak Ben-Zvi in Jerusalem.

== History and activities ==
Yad Ben-Zvi is a research institute established to continue the Zionist, educational and cultural activities of Israel's second and longest-serving president, Yizhak Ben–Zvi. It is housed in the home and offices of Ben-Zvi and his wife, Rachel Yanait, in Jerusalem's Rehavia neighborhood.

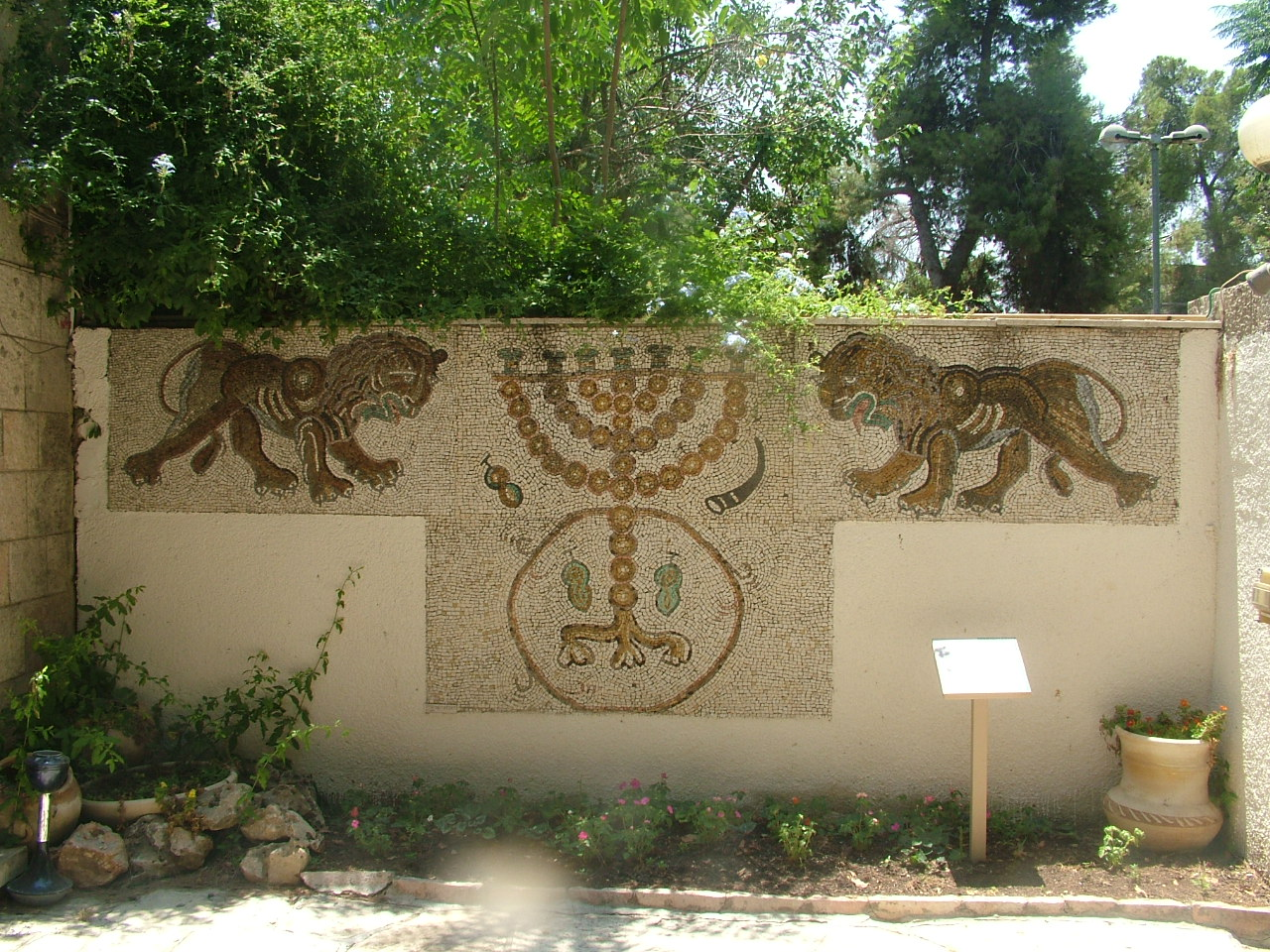
Floor mosaic from Byzantine period synagogue: lions of Judah, menorah, shofar, etrogs. Displayed at Yad Ben Zvi.

Ben-Zvi founded the institute in 1947 to explore the history and culture of the Jewish communities living in Arab countries. It houses a library of manuscripts, rare books and a photographic archive, and runs an academic publishing house.

=== Education ===
Yad-Ben Zvi organizes courses, seminars, lectures and special tours of Jerusalem.

In 2012, the institute opened a new international school for Jerusalem studies in a renovated historic building formerly known as the Pioneer Women's House.

=== Publications ===
The institute's publishing house publishes specific studies as well as three academic journals (in Hebrew):

- Discontinued: Sefunot, the Institute's annual, published between 1956 and 2017, with articles on Jewish communities in the East, from the end of the Middle Ages to the present.
- Pe'amim: Studies in Oriental Jewry (or "Studies on Jewish Heritage in the East") The Institute's quarterly, published since 1978, it deals with the history, cultures and folklore of Jewish communities in the MENA region (North Africa and the Middle East). Digitized issues appear on the Institute's website since 2011. Complete list and details at JSTOR here.
- Cathedra: For the History of Eretz Israel and Its Yishuv (Hebrew קתדרה: לתולדות ארץ ישראל ), also known as Cathedra: Quarterly for the History of Eretz Israel; also transliterated as Katedra; since 1976, website here
- Et-mol, full title: Et-Mol: Iton Letoldot Eretz Yisrael Ve'am Yisrael, '"Et-Mol: Journal on the History of the Eretz Yisrael and Am Yisrael', in the sense of the Land of Israel and Jewish peoplehood/the Jewish people.
