= Samuel Weltsch =

- Born: September 12, 1835; Prague, Bohemia, Austrian Empire
- Died: August 5, 1901 (aged 65) Prague, Bohemia, Austria-Hungary
- Genres: Jewish liturgical music
- Occupation: Cantor

Samuel Weltsch (September 12, 1835 – August 5, 1901) was a Bohemian hazzan and composer.

== Biography ==
Samuel Weltsch was born in Prague into a family of ḥazzanim. He early entered the profession, and became cantor of the Maisel Synagogue at Prague while quite a young man. He received his musical education at the Prague Conservatory of Music. In 1865 he received a call from the Ahawath Chesed Congregation in New York, and remained its cantor until 1880, when he resigned the position in order to return to his native city.

During his stay in New York he was active in improving the musical service of the American synagogue. Weltsch was one of the collaborators on the first three volumes of the Zimrat Yah, a fourth volume of which was later added by Alois Kaiser of Baltimore, containing music for all the seasons of the year. In addition he published Psalm 93 with German words for solo and chorus, and Todtenfeier, two hymns for the memorial service.

He was a prominent member of B'nai B'rith and took great interest in communal affairs in Prague, being the leading spirit in various charitable and educational organizations.

== Publications ==
- Weltsch, Samuel (1871). Todtenfeier: 2 Chöre für gemischte Stimmen und Soli. Vienna: K. K. Hoflith & Steindr v. G. Wegelein.
- Weltsch, Samuel. Der Herr ist Koenig: Psalm 93 in Musik gesetzt. New York: E. Schuberth.
- Goldstein, Morris; Weltsch, Samuel; Kaiser, Alois; Rice, I. L., eds. (1871–1886). Zimrath Yah: Liturgic Songs, Consisting of Hebrew, English and German Psalms and Hymns. Vol. 1–4. New York.
- Weltsch, Samuel; Kaiser, Alois. Temple Music. New York: S. Weltsch & A. Kaiser.
