= Theodor Creizenach =

German poet

Theodor Creizenach (17 April 1818, Mainz – 6 December 1877, Frankfurt) was a German Jewish poet and historian of literature. He was the son of Michael Creizenach.

He studied classical antiquities in Giessen, Göttingen, and Heidelberg, and then lived for several years at Paris as tutor in the house of Aaron Anselm Rothschild. Upon his return from Paris in 1842 Creizenach became teacher in the Jewish Philanthropin at Frankfort-on-the-Main, and was one of the principal founders of the Frankfort Jewish Reformverein; in 1854, however, he abandoned the faith of his fathers and embraced Christianity. Creizenach was made teacher of the Frankfort municipal high school in 1859, and appointed professor of history and literature at the Frankfort gymnasium in 1863.

In the literary world he attracted attention by his poetry: Dichtungen, Frankfort, 1839; and Gedichte, Frankfort, 1848; 2d ed., 1851. Being familiar with the personality and life of Goethe in his relations to Frankfort, he edited and published Goethe's correspondence with Marianne von Willemer, under the title Der Briefwechsel Zwischen Goethe und Marianne von Willemer, 2d ed., Stuttgart, 1878.

In conjunction with Oskar Jäger he took charge of the new edition of Friedrich Christoph Schlosser's Weltgeschichte, 1870 et seq.; and in conjunction with Otto Müller edited a weekly publication, Das Frankfurter Museum.

== Jewish Encyclopedia bibliography ==
- Adolph Kohut, Berühmte Israelitische Männer und Frauen, xi. 383, Leipsic, 1901;
- Meyers Konversations-Lexikon
- () By Isidore Singer & Benuel H. Brumberg
