= Sefunot (journal) =

Academic journal on the study of Oriental Jewish communities

Sefunot: Studies and Sources on the History of the Jewish Communities in the East
- Discipline: Oriental Jewish communities
- Language: Hebrew

Publication details
- History: 1956–2017
- Publisher: Ben-Zvi Institute (Israel)
- Frequency: Annual

Standard abbreviations
- ISO 4: Sefunot

Indexing
- ISSN: 0582-3943
- JSTOR: 23414445
- OCLC no.: 124058139

Sefunot (Hebrew: ספונות) was a Hebrew-language academic journal, published annually, dealing with the study of Jewish communities in the East, from the end of the Middle Ages unto the present time. It was initiated by Meir Benayahu, and jointly published by the Ben Zvi Institute and the Hebrew University of Jerusalem. A total of 26 books have been published in 25 volumes. The first book was published in 1956 and the last in 2017. The appellative Sefunot was chosen for the Annual, as it has the distinct meaning of "those things concealed," an allusion to the obscure nature of these Jewish communities.

== History ==
The Annual, published first in 1956, has had a turbulent history: vol. 15, being the last of the Old Series, was issued after vol. 16, dated 1971–1981, an error which caused some bewilderment to its subscribers. Volumes 11–14 which constitute The book of Greek Jewry in four parts were dated 1971–7 (vols. 11 and 12) and 1971–8 (vols. 13 and 14). The first issue of the Annual includes studies of the communities of India and Egypt, Aleppo and Yemen, Safed and Corfu, Turkey and Italy, publishing documents from archives and community record-books, among other literary sources related to these communities.

Discussing the New Series, Vol. 1(16) of Sefunot: studies and sources on the history of the Jewish communities in the East, a review states that the chronological-historical range of the "volume spans ten centuries while its geographical range includes Babylon, Palestine, Syria, the Yemen, the Balkans, the Northern Caucasus, Egypt and North Africa." A number of important articles published in that volume include 1) the history of Cordovian and Lurianic Kabbalah, 2) the history of early Zionist activities in Egypt at the turn of the 20th-century, 3) Turkish documents on the rebuilding of Tiberias in the sixteenth century, 4) studies on the Mountain Jews of the Northern Caucasus, 5) studies on the Jews of Yemen, with important liturgical, literary, and linguistic contributions related to this community. The volume also contains a description of a short poem dated to the 10th century CE, dedicated to one of the leaders of the Jewish community in Baghdad, as well as three 13th-century philosophical treatises from Yemen which reflect the overwhelming influence of Maimonides' and Saadia Gaon's philosophy on the Yemenite Jewish community.

=== The editors of the journal ===
The first seven books of the first series were edited by Yitzhak Ben-Zvi, the President of Israel, and Meir Benayahu. After Ben Zvi's passing, in 1963, Benayahu edited the eight additional books of this series. All articles in the first series were written in the Hebrew language, and at the end of each volume abstracts of the English language articles appeared. Some of the books in the series were dedicated to a specific theme (Sabbatai Zevi movement, Safed, and Greek Jewry), in honour of a person (Shneur Zalman Shazar, Gershom Scholem) or in eulogy of the deceased (Isaiah Sonne and Yitzhak Ben-Zvi).

The New Series was edited by Shaul Shaked (one volume), Joseph Haker (three volumes), Menachem Ben-Sasson (three volumes) and Meir Bar-Asher (two volumes). Here, too, most of the articles were written in Hebrew, accompanied by abstracts at the end of the volume, although a number of articles appeared in English and French for the first time.

Many of the prominent Jewish scholars of the time participated in the journal, alongside rabbis and Israeli academia.

== Bibliography ==
- Ben-Zvi, Y. (1956). "Sefunot (Preface)". Sefunot: Studies and Sources on the History of the Jewish Communities in the East. 1. Jerusalem: Ben-Zvi Institute: 5. JSTOR 23414445.
- Heyd, U. [in Hebrew] (1966). "Turkish Documents on the Rebuilding of Tiberias in the sixteenth century". Sefunot: Studies and Sources on the History of the Jewish Communities in the East. 10: 193–210. JSTOR 23416042.
- Ratzaby, Yehudah [in Hebrew] (1957). "Sources for the history of the Jews of Yemen". Sefunot: Studies and Sources on the History of the Jewish Communities in the East (in Hebrew). 2. Jerusalem: Ben-Zvi Institute: 287–302. JSTOR 23414367.
- Shaked, Shaul; Haker, Joseph (1983). "[Review of Sefunot, New Series Vol. 1(16)]". Bulletin of the School of Oriental and African Studies. 46 (3). London: Cambridge University Press: 537–539. JSTOR 618415.
