= Israel Taglicht =

Israel Taglicht (March 9, 1862 − December 13, 1943) was the Chief Rabbi of Austria.

== Life ==
Taglicht was born on March 9, 1862 in Berezó, Hungary, the son of Josef Taglicht and Nelly Spitzer.

A descendent of the Maharam Schick, Taglicht attended a religious elementary school and a yeshiva. After graduating high school, he went to Berlin and studied at the Hochschule für die Wissenschaft des Judentums and the University of Berlin, graduating from the latter with a Ph.D. in 1888. He qualified as a rabbi a year later and was elected Rabbi of the small Moravian town of Ungarisch-Ostra. He was Rabbi there for four years. In 1893, he was appointed spiritual leader of Mariahilf, in the Sixth and Seventh Districts of Vienna. After fourteen years there, he was elected Rabbi of the Fourteenth and Fifteenth Districts. He succeeded Max Grunwald's rabbinic office in 1910. In 1932, he became rabbi of Leopoldstädter Tempel, Vienna's main synagogue. In 1937, he was named Chief Rabbi of Vienna. He wrote a number of studies in German about the Tanach, Jewish cultural history, and contemporary Jewish issues. He worked with YIVO in Vienna and published two studies in Yiddish. He had a large amount of material related to the history of Vienna, but in 1938 the Nazis seized his entire library, manuscripts, and the unpublished eleventh volume of Forschungen zur Geschichte der Juden in Österreich (Research on the History of Jews in Austria).

In October 1935, Taglicht's daughter Edith (a teacher for Jewish schools in Berlin) was arrested by the Gestapo and sent to Moabit prison for writing an anti-Nazi article despite insistences from her friends she never wrote such an article or took any interest in politics. He received promises from Cardinal Theodor Innitzer and the Austrian legation in Berlin to help secure her release and he personally went to Berlin, although she wouldn't be released until March 1936, five months after her arrest. In April 1938, after the Anschluss, he was returning home from Shabbat services when he was forced to picket two Jewish firms while holding a placard. He was only allowed to stop when a Jewish patron volunteered to take the rabbi's place. Several months before World War II began, he managed to escape to England and spent the rest of his life there.

In 1892, Taglicht married Rachel Rappaport.

Taglicht died in Cambridge on December 13, 1943. His funeral took place in Cambridge.
