= Michael Creizenach =

Michael Creizenach (born in Mainz May 16, 1789; died in Frankfort-on-the-Main, August 5, 1842) was a German Jewish educator, mathematician, theologian, and proponent of the Reform movement.

Creizenach is typical of the era of transition, following the epoch of Moses Mendelssohn. Creizenach was educated in the traditional way, devoting his whole time to Talmudic studies; and he was sixteen years old when he began to acquire the elements of secular knowledge. This was during the French occupation. He studied mathematics with great zeal, and wrote text-books on it. Through his influence a Jewish school was founded in Mayence, whose principal he was, at the same time giving private instruction. He was a very popular teacher, and counted many Christians among his pupils.

In 1825 Creizenach was appointed teacher at the Philanthropin in Frankfort, where he found in I. M. Jost an enthusiastic coworker in pedagogic and reform endeavors. He held services regularly in the hall of the school, and introduced confirmation exercises. His literary works were also devoted to the advocacy of Reform on the basis of rabbinical Judaism. With this object he wrote his "Shulḥan 'Aruk," in which he essayed to prove that the Talmud as a whole was untenable, but that a compromise with modern ideas could be effected in the same dialectical way in which the Rabbis had harmonized the Law with the exigencies of their time. In the later parts of his work, however, he abandoned this view; advocating a return to pure Mosaism, which a year after his death was more distinctly proclaimed as the program of the Frankfort Reformverein, at the head of which was his son Theodor Creizenach.

In spite of his Reform tendencies, Creizenach was deeply interested in Hebrew literature, especially in Hebrew fiction, and during the last two years of his life edited with his friend Jost the Hebrew periodical Zion.

== Works ==
Creizenach's works are:

- "Versuch über die Parallellentheorie," Mainz, 1822
- "Lehrbuch der Darstellenden Geometrie," ib. 1822
- "Geist der Pharisäischen Lehre," a monthly, ib. 1823-24
- "Ḥeshbon ha-Nefesh, oder Selbstprüfung des Israeliten Während der Busstage," Frankfurt-on-the-Main, 1838
- "Ḥinnuk li-Bene Miẓwah, oder Stunden der Weihe für Israelitische Confirmanden," ib. 1841
- Ibn Ezra's "Yesod Mora" (edited with a German translation), ib. 1840
- "32 Thesen über den Talmud," ib. 1831
- "Lehrbuch der Technischen Geometrie," ib. 1828
- "Lehrbuch der Algebra," Stuttgart and Leipzig, 1835.

His chief work, mentioned above, is "Shulḥan 'Aruk, oder Encyklopädische Darstellung des Mosaischen Gesetzes," etc., in 4 vols.:

1. "Thariag, oder Inbegriff der Mosaischen Vorschriften nach Talmudischer Interpretation," ib. 1833
2. "Shurat ha-Din, Anweisung zur Regulirung des Israelitisch-Religiösen Lebens," etc., ib. 1837
3. "Ḥizzuḳ ha-Torah, oder die Dringlich Gewordene Befestigung der Mosaischen Lehre," etc., ib. 1839
4. "Dorshe ha-Dorot, oder Entwickelungslehre des Mosaischen Ritualgesetzes," etc., ib. 1840.
