= Eduard Gans =

German jurist (1797–1839)

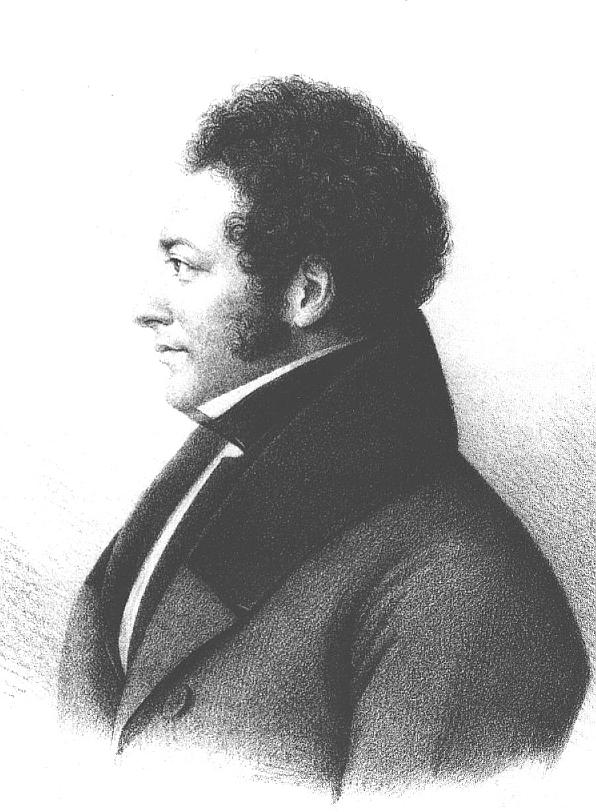
Eduard Gans

Eduard Gans (March 22, 1797 – May 5, 1839) was a German jurist and proponent of Hegelianism in legal philosophy.

== Biography ==
Gans was born in Berlin to prosperous Jewish parents. He studied law first at the University of Berlin, then at Göttingen, and finally at Heidelberg. In 1820, having earned his doctorate the previous year under A. F. J. Thibaut, he returned to Berlin as a lecturer, where he developed a close intellectual relationship with G. W. F. Hegel. In 1825 he converted to the Evangelical Church in Prussia, and the following year was appointed extraordinary, and in 1828 ordinary, professor in the Berlin University faculty of law. Before converting, he was a member of the Society for Jewish Culture and Jewish Studies, alongside Joel Abraham List, Isaac Marcus Jost and Leopold Zunz.

At this period, the historical school of jurisprudence was coming to the front. Gans, with his Hegelian tendencies predisposing him to treat law historically, applied the method to one special branch—the right of succession. His great work, Erbrecht in weltgeschichtlicher Entwicklung (1824, 1825, 1829 and 1835), contains an extensive survey of facts, and presents the general theory of the slow evolution of legal principles.

In 1830, and again in 1835, Gans visited Paris, and formed an intimate acquaintance with the leaders of literary culture and criticism there. The liberality of his views, especially on political matters, drew upon Gans the displeasure of the Prussian government, and his course of lectures on the history of the last fifty years (published as Vorlesungen über die Geschichte der letzten fünfzig Jahre, Leipzig, 1833–1834) was prohibited. He died in Berlin.

Other works are a treatise on the fundamental laws of property (Über die Grundlage des Besitzes, Berlin, 1829), a portion of a systematic work on the Roman civil law (System des römischen Zivilrechts, 1827), and a collection of his miscellaneous writings (Vermischte Schriften. 1832). Gans edited the Philosophie der Geschichte in Hegel's Werke, and contributed a preface. He also wrote Das Erbrecht in Weltgeschichtlicher Entwickelung (4 vols., 1834) which was translated into French.
