= Leopold Zunz =

German Reform Rabbi (1794–1886)

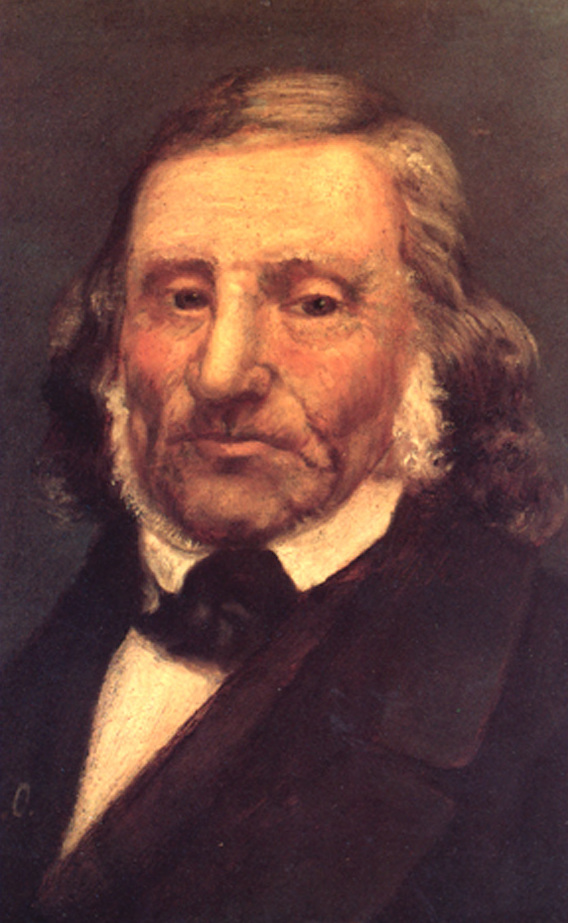
- Portrait by Moritz Daniel Oppenheim

Personal life
- Born: 10 August 1794 Detmold
- Died: 17 March 1886 (aged 91) Berlin
- Spouse: Adelheid Beermann (m. 1822)
- Occupation: Rabbi, writer, activist

Religious life
- Religion: Judaism
- Denomination: Reform Judaism

Leopold Zunz (Hebrew: יום טוב צונץ—Yom Tov Tzuntz, Yiddish: ליפמאַן צונץ—Lipman Tsunts; 10 August 1794 – 17 March 1886) was the founder of academic Judaic Studies (Wissenschaft des Judentums), the critical investigation of Jewish literature, hymnology and ritual. Zunz's historical investigations and contemporary writings had an important influence on contemporary Judaism.

== Biography ==
Leopold Zunz was born at Detmold, the son of Talmud scholar Immanuel Menachem Zunz (1759–1802) and Hendel Behrens (1773–1809), the daughter of Dov Beer, an assistant cantor of the Detmold community. The year following his birth his family moved to Hamburg, where, as a young boy, he began learning Hebrew grammar, the Pentateuch, and the Talmud. His father, who was his first teacher, died in July 1802, when Zunz was not quite eight years old. He subsequently gained admission to the Jewish "free school" (Freischule) founded by Philipp Samson, in Wolfenbüttel. Departing from home in July 1803, he saw his mother for the last time (she died in 1809 during his years in Wolfenbüttel). A turning point in Zunz's development came in 1807, when Samuel Meyer Ehrenberg, a reform-minded educator, took over the directorship of the Samson School. Ehrenberg reorganized the curriculum, introducing, alongside traditional learning, new subjects such as religion, history, geography, French, and German; he became Zunz's mentor, and they remained friends until Ehrenberg's death in 1853.

The summer of 1811 is noteworthy as the time when Zunz made his first acquaintance with Johann Christoph Wolf's Bibliotheca Hebræa, which, together with David Gans's Tzemach David, gave him his first introduction to Jewish literature and the first impulse to think of the "Science of Judaism."

He settled in Berlin in 1815, studying at the University of Berlin and obtaining a doctorate from the University of Halle. He was ordained by the Hungarian rabbi Aaron Chorin, an early supporter of religious reform, and served for two years teaching and giving sermons in the Beer reformed synagogue in Berlin. He found the career uncongenial, and in 1840 he was appointed director of a Lehrerseminar, a post which relieved him from pecuniary troubles. Zunz was always interested in politics, and in 1848 addressed many public meetings. In 1850 he resigned his headship of the Teachers' Seminary, and was awarded a pension. Throughout his early and married life he was the champion of Jewish rights, and he did not withdraw from public affairs until 1874, the year of the death of his wife Adelheid Beermann, whom he had married in 1822.

Together with other young men, among them the poet Heinrich Heine, Zunz founded the Society for Jewish Culture and Jewish Studies alongside Joel Abraham List, Isaac Marcus Jost, and Eduard Gans in Berlin in 1819. In 1823, Zunz became the editor of the Zeitschrift für die Wissenschaft des Judenthums (Journal for the Science of Judaism). The ideals of this Society were not destined to bear religious fruit, but the "Science of Judaism" survived. Zunz "took no large share in Jewish reform", but never lost faith in the regenerating power of "science" as applied to the traditions and literary legacies of the ages. He influenced Judaism from the study rather than from the pulpit.

Although affiliated with the Reform movement, Zunz appeared to show little sympathy for it, though this has been attributed to his disdain for ecclesiastical ambition and fears that rabbinical autocracy would result from the Reform crusade. Further, Isidore Singer and Emil Hirsch have stated that "the point of (Geiger's) protest against Reform was directed against Samuel Holdheim and the position maintained by this leader as an autonomous rabbi." Later in life Zunz went so far as to refer to rabbis as soothsayers and quacks.

The violent outcry raised against the Talmud by some of the principal spirits of the Reform party was repugnant to Zunz's historic sense. Zunz himself was temperamentally inclined to assign a determinative potency to sentiment, this explaining his tender reverence for ceremonial usages. Although Zunz kept to the Jewish ritual practises, he understood them as symbols (see among others his meditation on tefillin, reprinted in "Gesammelte Schriften," ii. 172-176). This contrasts with the traditional view of the validity of divine ordinances according to which the faithful are bound to observe without inquiry into their meaning. His position accordingly approached that of the symbolists among the reformers who insisted that symbols had their function, provided their suggestive significance was spontaneously comprehensible. He emphasized most strongly the need of a moral regeneration of the Jews.

He wrote precise philological studies but also impassioned speeches on the Jewish nation and history that had an influence on later Jewish historians. Zunz wrote in 1855:

"If there are ranks in suffering, Israel takes precedence of all the nations; if the duration of sorrows and the patience with which they are borne ennoble, the Jews can challenge the aristocracy of every land; if a literature is called rich in the possession of a few classic tragedies—what shall we say to a National Tragedy lasting for fifteen hundred years, in which the poets and the actors were also the heroes?"

In 1840 he became director of the Berlin Jewish Teachers' Seminary.

He was friendly with the traditional Enlightenment figure Nachman Krochmal whose Moreh Nebuke ha-Zeman (Lemberg, 1851), was edited by Zunz.

Zunz urged his contemporaries to, through the embrace of study of a wide swath of literature, grasp the geist or "spirit" of the Jewish people. Zunz proposed an ambitious Jewish historiography and further proposed that Jewish people adopt history as a way of life. Zunz not only proposed a university vision of Jewish studies, but believed Jewish history to be an inseparable part of human culture. Zunz's historiographical view aligns with the "lachrymose" view of Jewish history of persecution. Zunz was the least philosophically inclined of the Wissenschaft but the most devoted to scholarship. Zunz called for an "emanicipation" of Jewish scholarship "from the theologians."

Contrasting with earlier bible printing, Zunz adopted a re-Hebraization of names.

Zunz was politically active and was elected to office. He believed that Jewish emancipation would come out of universal human rights. The revolutionary year of 1848 had an influence on Zunz, and he expressed a messianic eagerness in the ideals of equality. Zunz's stated goal was to transform Prussia into a democratic republic.

Zunz died in Berlin in 1886.

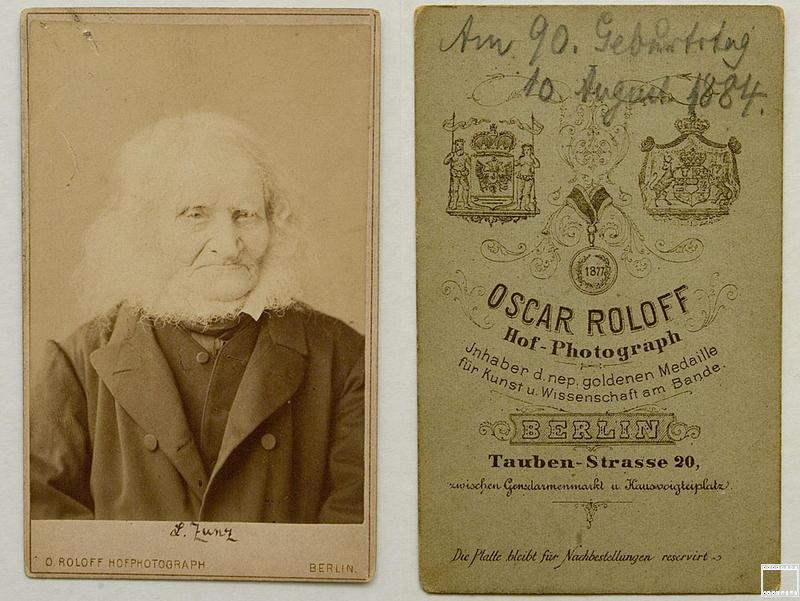
Leopold Zunz on his 90th birthday, 10 August 1884

== Works ==
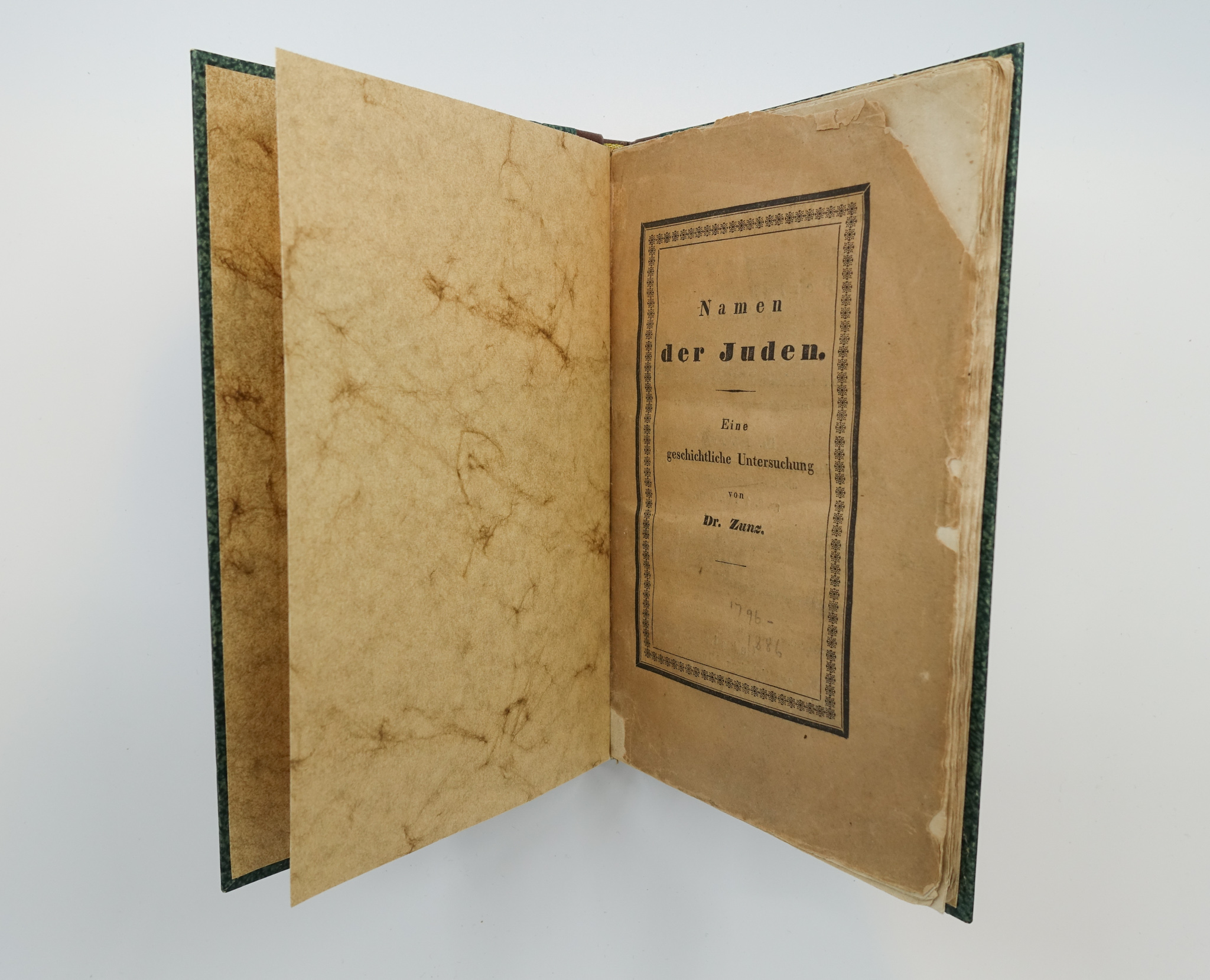
First edition of Namen der Juden, 1837, in the collection of the Jewish Museum of Switzerland

Zunz's famous article "Etwas über die rabbinische Litteratur" ("On Rabbinical Literature"), published in 1818, established the intellectual agenda of the Wissenschaft des Judentums ("Science of Judaism"), while adumbrating the main themes of his own future work as well. Even at this early stage of his academic career, Zunz mapped out his concept of the Wissenschaft des Judentums which he intended to serve as a medium for presenting, preserving, and transmitting the corpus of Jewish literary works. Zunz believed that only an academic approach to Jewish texts and a comprehensive and interdisciplinary academic framework would allow for the adequate study of Jewish themes and Judaism. In 1832 appeared "the most important Jewish book published in the 19th century." This was Zunz's Gottesdienstliche Vorträge der Juden, i.e. a history of the Sermon. It lays down principles for the investigation of the Rabbinic exegesis (Midrash) and of the siddur (prayer-book of the synagogue). This book raised Zunz to the supreme position among Jewish scholars. In 1845 appeared his Zur Geschichte und Literatur, in which he threw light on the literary and social history of the Jews. He had visited the British Museum in 1846, and this confirmed him in his plan for his third book, Synagogale Poesie des Mittelalters (1855). It was from this book that George Eliot translated the following opening of a chapter of Daniel Deronda: "If there are ranks in suffering, Israel takes precedence of all the nations...". After its publication Zunz again visited England, and in 1859 issued his Ritus. In this he gives a masterly survey of synagogal rites. His last great book was his Literaturgeschichte der synagogalen Poesie (1865). A supplement appeared in 1867. Besides these works, Zunz published a new translation of the Bible, and wrote many essays which were afterwards collected as Gesammelte Schriften.

- Etwas über die rabbinische Litteratur. Berlin : Maurersche Buchhandlung, 1818. Digital Form SLUB Dresden via EOD
- Die gottesdienstlichen Vorträge der Juden historisch entwickelt: Ein Beitrag zur Alterthumskunde u. biblischen Kritik, zur Literatur- u. Religionsgeschichte. Berlin : Asher, 1832. Digital Form Freimann-Sammlung, Frankfurt.
  - Translated into Hebrew as הדרשות בישראל והשתלשלותן ההיסטורית (1947, Bialik Institute)
- Namen der Juden: Eine geschichtliche Untersuchung, Leipzig, L. Fort, 1837.
- Die vier und zwanzig Bücher der Heiligen Schrift: Nach dem masoretischen Texte / unter der Redaction von Dr. Zunz; übersetzt von H. Arnheim, Dr. Julius Fürst, Dr. M. Sachs. Berlin : Veit, 1837/1839.
- Zur Geschichte und Literatur. Berlin: Veit, 1845. Digital Form Freimann-Sammlung, Frankfurt.
- Predigten gehalten in der neuen Israelitischen Synagoge zu Berlin. Berlin: Schlesinger 1846.
- Die synagogale Poesie des Mittelalters. Berlin, 1855. Digital Form Freimann-Sammlung, Frankfurt.
- Samuel Meyer Ehrenberg, Inspektor der Samsonschen Freischule zu Wolfenbüttel. Braunschweig: Gebrüder Meyer, 1854.
- Die [sic] Ritus des synagogalen Gottesdienstes geschichtlich entwickelt. Berlin: Springer, 1859. (Die synagogale Poesie des Mittelalters; Bd. 2) Digital Form Freimann-Sammlung Frankfurt.
- Deutsche Briefe. Leipzig, F.A. Brockhaus, 1872.
- Die Monatstage des Kalenderjahres; ein Andenken an Hingeschiedene. Berlin; M. Poppelauer, 1872.
- Literaturgeschichte der synagogalen Poesie. Berlin : Gerschel, 1865, mit einem Ergänzungsband 1867. Digital Form Freimann-Sammlung, Frankfurt.
- Gesammelte Schriften. Berlin : Gerschel, 1875–76, Bd. 1, Bd. 2, Bd.3. Digital Form: Freimann-Sammlung, Frankfurt.
- Zeitschrift für die Wissenschaft des Judentums Jg. 1, Heft 1–3, 1822 (not more published). Edited by Leopold Zunz and Eduard Gans. Digital Form Compact Memory, Frankfurt. (About: J. Raphael, "Die Zeitschrift des Dr. L. Z". in Zeitschrift f. d. Geschichte der Juden, Heft 1/1970, Tel Aviv: Olamenu, S. 31–36)
