= Biblioteca della Comunità Israelitica =

Jewish library in Rome, Italy

The Biblioteca della Comunità Israelitica was the library of the Jewish community of Rome, Italy. Established in the early 20th century, it housed approximately 7,000 rare or unique books and manuscripts dating back to at least the 16th century. According to the Central Registry of Looted Art, it was the most important Jewish library in Italy and one of the most important in the world. The contents of the library were looted by Nazi Germany shortly after the Raid of the Ghetto of Rome in October 1943, and have never been recovered. Two months later, the contents of the Collegio Rabbinico Italiano, the Italian Rabbinical College's library located in the same building, were also looted; only part of the contents of the latter library have been recovered.

== Contents ==
The Biblioteca della Comunità Israelitica was set up in the early 20th century in rooms above the Great Synagogue of Rome at Lungotevere De' Cenci. Its contents consisted of publications that had previously been held at one of the five synagogues of the Roman Ghetto or other locations in the Jewish community of Rome. The library of the Italian Rabbinical College, housed in the same building, had been transferred from Florence to Rome in the 1930s. The latter was a teaching library of almost 10,000 volumes.

The Biblioteca della Comunità Israelitica contained many rare or unique books and manuscripts, dating back to at least the 16th century. No complete catalogue exists, but visiting scholars compiled some specific lists during visits before the war. It is estimated that the library contained a quarter of all the work of the Soncinos, Jewish Italian printers from the 16th century who later worked in Salonica and Constantinople, as well as 16th-century works by Daniel Bomberg, Alvise Bragadin, and Nicollet. The library contained approximately 7,000 volumes in all. A partial catalogue was compiled by Jewish Italian historian Isaiah Sonne in 1935, who classified the contents into texts printed by the Soncinos, manuscripts, incunabula, 16th-century oriental copies printed in Constantinople, and special specimens. Sonne, however, complained that he was allowed to see only the second-best items in the library. The lack of a proper catalogue may have been inspired in part by a desire to protect the contents from destruction by the Catholic church which, historically, had done so before to Jewish publications.

The Central Registry of Looted Art quoted an expert, Attilio Milano, who stated in a letter that "no other Italian Jewish library had so many priceless books and very few outside Italy exceeded it".

== Looting ==
With the surrender of Italy on 8 September 1943, Germany occupied northern and central Italy, including the Italian capital, Rome. The libraries of the Jewish community in Rome soon attracted German attention. According to an eyewitness, two uniformed men visited the Biblioteca della Comunità Israelitica and the Italian Rabbinical College library, located in the same building, on 30 September and 1 October 1943. One of the two introduced himself as a teacher of Hebrew at an institute in Berlin, most likely Johannes Pohl from the Institute for Study of the Jewish Question, who had fulfilled a similar role at the Jewish libraries in Amsterdam.

Attempts were made to receive support from the Fascist Italian government to retain the contents of the libraries in Italy, but these received no sympathy there.

On 14 October 1943, two days before the raid on the Roman Ghetto, the contents of the Biblioteca della Comunità Israelitica and parts of the contents of the Rabbinical College library were taken away. The remainder of the contents of the Rabbinical College library were taken on 23 and 24 December 1943. A few isolated books and prints survived the looting either by being hidden by members of the community or overlooked by the Germans.

Under the control of the German military administration, the contents of the library were loaded onto two railway cars by an Italian company and sent to Germany via Switzerland. A letter by the Reichsleiter Rosenberg Taskforce (ERR) from 21 January 1944, most likely referring to the second load of loot, stated that it had been delivered to an institute in Frankfurt am Main. The priceless contents of the community library were of special interest to the Rosenberg organisation, and it had set up a special organisation, the Sonderkommando Italien, for their activities in the country.

The records of the correspondence of the ERR were destroyed by a bombing raid on Berlin in November 1943. The Italian commission trying to locate the library contents came to the conclusion that the first train in October did not go to Frankfurt but to Berlin, which would explain why some of the contents of the second train were found after the war. None of the contents of the first train were ever recovered.

== Fate of the contents ==
Only part of the contents of the Rabbinical College library was recovered in 1947, consisting of 20 incunabula. None of the material taken from the Biblioteca della Comunità Israelitica was ever recovered.

The most likely theory as to the fate of the library contents is that they were stored during the war in an area that became part of the postwar Occupation Zone of the Soviet Union. From there the contents were taken to the Soviet Union and could now possibly be located within the Russian Federation. Theories that the contents of the library were either destroyed during a bombing raid on the train transporting it to Germany, or in Germany itself, have been considered but discounted as less likely.

In 2002, the Italian government established a special commission to pursue the recovery of the contents of the library, carrying out research in a number of European countries. The commission looked into the possibility that the missing contents either went to Frankfurt, Berlin, or Frankfurt via Berlin. The Frankfurt option was seen as the less likely one as much of the looted books that had been stored there or at another deposit, at Hungen, also in Hesse, had fallen into the hands of American forces after the war and been returned, including prints from the Rabbinical College. It is estimated that Nazi Germany looted up to 3 million books during World War II, of which 1.2 million were found at the end of the war at Hungen alone.

The more likely option was that the contents went to Berlin and either remained there or were evacuated to Ratibor, Silesia (now Racibórz, Poland), where, at either place, they would eventually have come under control of the Soviet Union.

The commission's research was complicated by the fact that two competing organisations existed in Nazi Germany which acquired looted Jewish publications with the aim of creating a library, the Amt Rosenberg (the ERR) and the Reichssicherheitshauptamt (the SS), the latter with the aim of using it as a source of information on their perceived enemy. As no records for the first transport of the loot are known to have survived, there is no certainty which of the two organisations received the two rail cars from October 1943. The commission's research in Russia was also hampered by the fact that certain archives were closed to it, such as the archive of the Russian Federal Security Service.

The lack of a proper catalogue has greatly hampered the recovery of the contents, as it is almost impossible to know what the library actually contained. In 1965, two Hebrew manuscripts with the stamp of the library were acquired by the Jewish Theological Seminary Library in New York, both of which were listed in the catalogue Sonne compiled in the 1930s. It is unclear how the manuscripts reached the United States and at what point after their cataloguing by Sonne in 1935 they were removed from the library. No details on the history of the two manuscripts between 1935 and 1965 could be established.

The ultimate fate of the library's contents remain a mystery, however, as all investigations, including that of the Italian government commission, have been inconclusive.

== In popular culture ==
The Biblioteca della Comunità Israelitica features prominently in the 2023 novel The Testament of Elias, by W. S. Mahler.
