= Sobotište =

Village in Slovakia

- Municipality
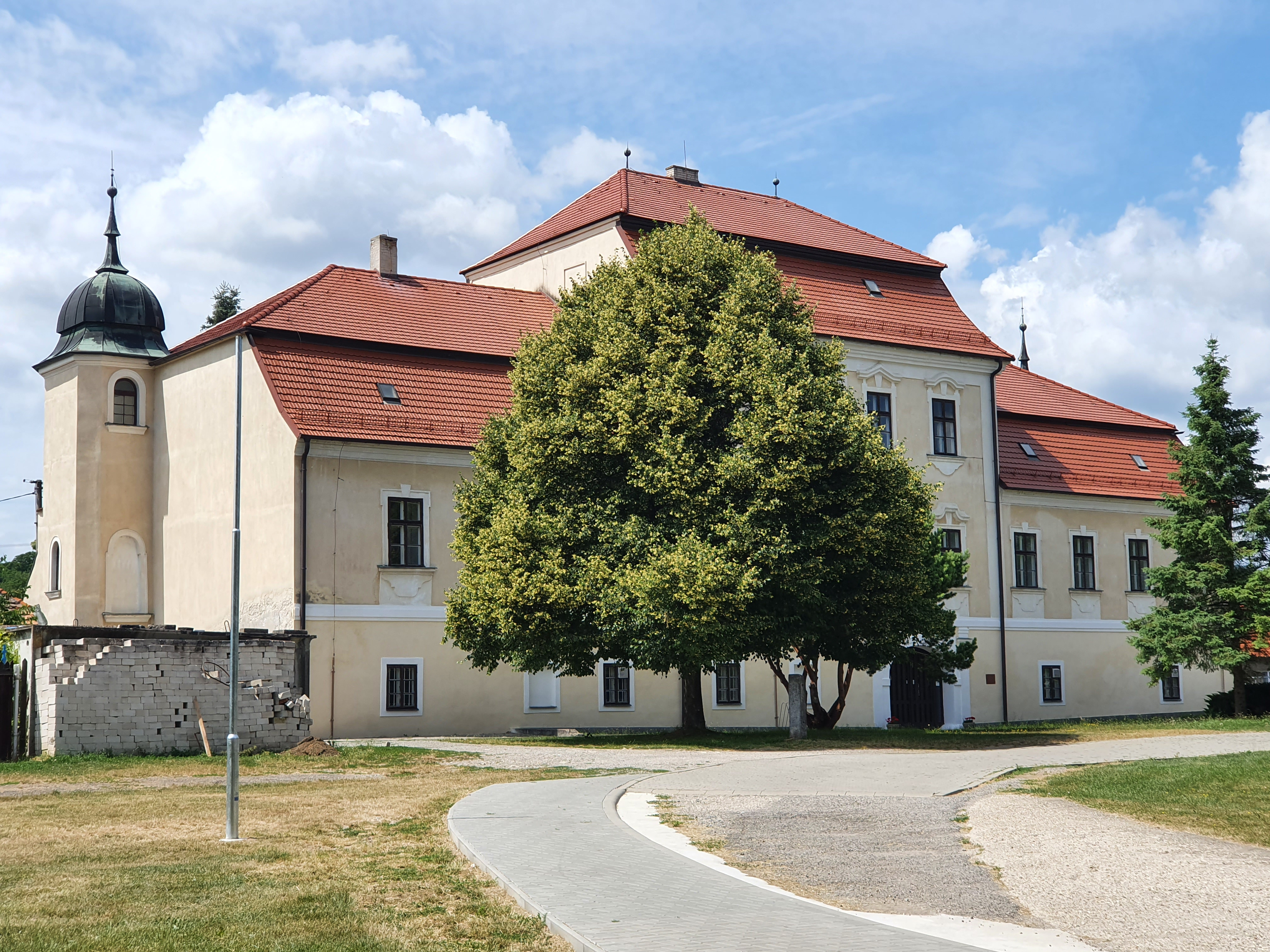

- Flag

- Location of Sobotište in the Trnava Region Location of Sobotište in Slovakia
- Coordinates: 48.72°N 17.40°E
- Country: Slovakia
- Region: Trnava Region
- District: Senica District
- First mentioned: 1241

Area
  - Total: 32.25 km^{2} (12.45 sq mi)
- Elevation: 266 m (873 ft)

Population (2025)
  - Total: 1,492
- Time zone: UTC+1 (CET)
  - Summer (DST): UTC+2 (CEST)
- Postal code: 906 05
- Area code: +421 34
- Vehicle registration plate (until 2022): SE
- Website: www.sobotiste.sk

Sobotište (Hungarian: Ószombat; until 1899, Szobotist) is a village and municipality in Senica District in the Trnava Region of western Slovakia. In 1845 it was the location of the establishment of the first cooperative in Europe by Samuel Jurkovič (Spolok gazdovský).

== Geography ==
The municipality lies at an altitude of 266 metres (873 ft) and covers an area of 32.25 km^{2} (12.45 sq mi) (2025).

== Districts ==
- Sobotište
- Javorec

== History ==
In historical records the village was first mentioned in 1241.

== Population ==
Population statistic (10 years)
Year	1995	2005	2015	2025
Count	1568	1520	1501	1492
Difference		−3.06%	−1.25%	−0.59%

Population statistic
Year	2024	2025
Count	1483	1492
Difference		+0.60%

It has a population of 1492 people (31 December 2025).

=== Ethnicity ===
Census 2021 (1+ %)
Ethnicity	Number	Fraction
Slovak	1391	97.68%
Not found out	26	1.82%
Total	1424	

In year 2021 was 1424 people by ethnicity 1391 as Slovak, 26 as Not found out, 11 as Czech, 4 as German, 3 as Other, 2 as Serbian, 2 as Silesian, 1 as Romani, 1 as Rusyn, 1 as Austrian, 1 as Polish, 1 as Moravian and 1 as Hungarian.

Note on population: The difference values of population numbers in the table "Population statistic" and in the sections "Ethnicity" & "Religion" is caused by the use of various statistical methods.

=== Religion ===
Census 2021 (1+ %)
Religion	Number	Fraction
Evangelical Church	687	48.24%
Roman Catholic Church	390	27.39%
None	315	22.12%
Not found out	22	1.54%
Total	1424	

In year 2021 was 1424 people by religion 687 from Evangelical Church, 390 from Roman Catholic Church, 315 from None, 22 from Not found out, 2 from Buddhism, 2 from Apostolic Church, 2 from Ad hoc movements, 1 from Paganism and natural spirituality, 1 from Other and not ascertained christian church, 1 from Greek Catholic Church and 1 from United Methodist Church.

== People ==
- Samuel Jurkovič
- Alois Kaiser, Austrian-US chazzan, composer
- Bogoslav Šulek (born Bohuslav Šulek), 1816–1895, Slovak-Croatian philologist, historian, and lexicographer

== See also ==
- 26401 Sobotište
