= Leopoldstädter Tempel =

Former synagogue in Vienna, Austria

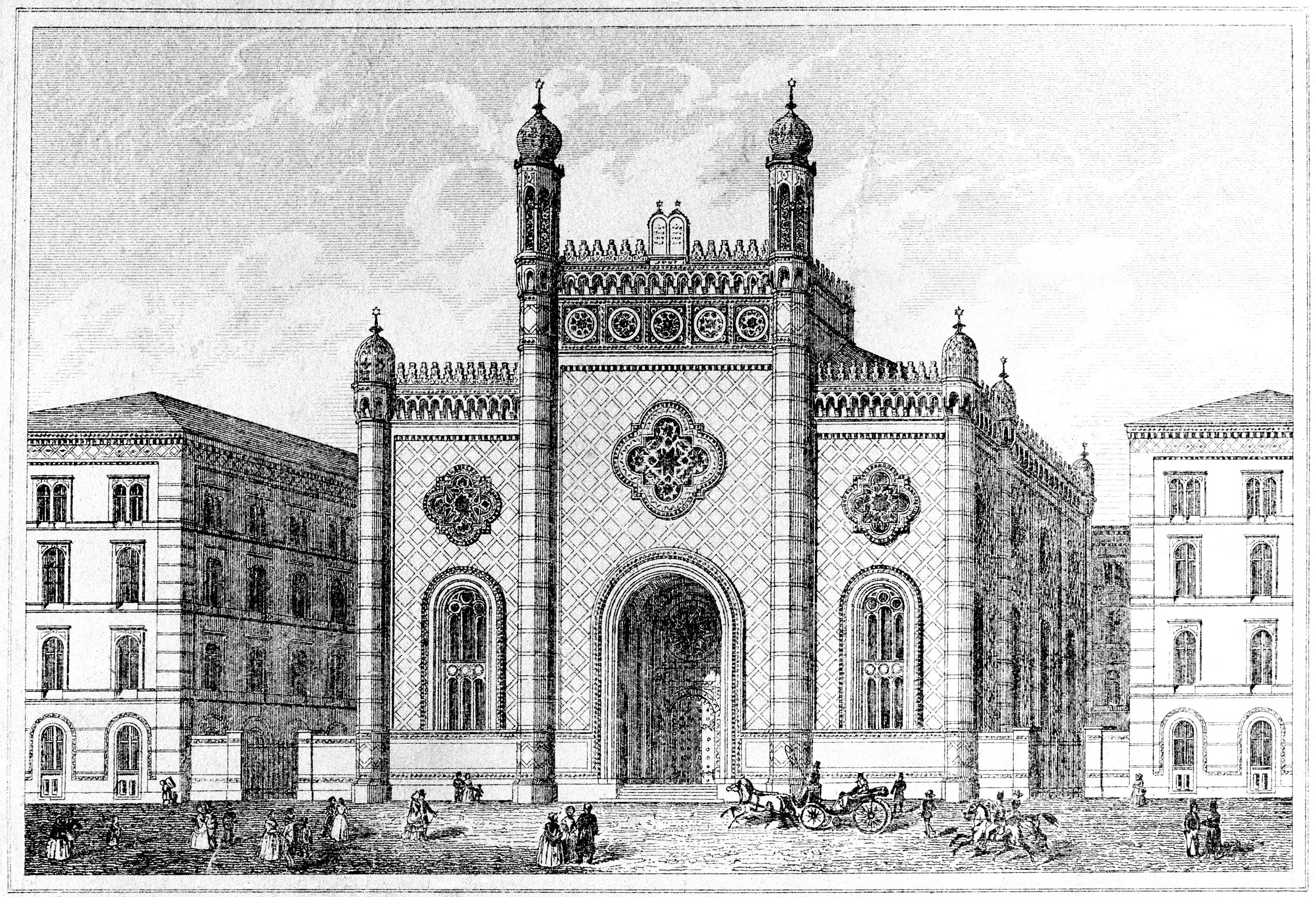
- An image of the former synagogue in 1858

- Location of the former synagogue in Austria

Religion
- Affiliation: Judaism (former)
- Ecclesiastical or organizational status: Synagogue (1858–1938)
- Status: Destroyed

Location
- Location: Vienna
- Country: Austria
- Interactive map of Leopoldstädter Tempel
- Coordinates: 48°12′50″N 16°23′06″E

Architecture
- Architect: Ludwig Förster
- Type: Synagogue architecture
- Style: Moorish Revival
- Established: c. 1810 (as a congregation)
- Completed: 1858
- Destroyed: 10 November 1938 on Kristallnacht
- Capacity: 2,240 sitting; 1,500 standing

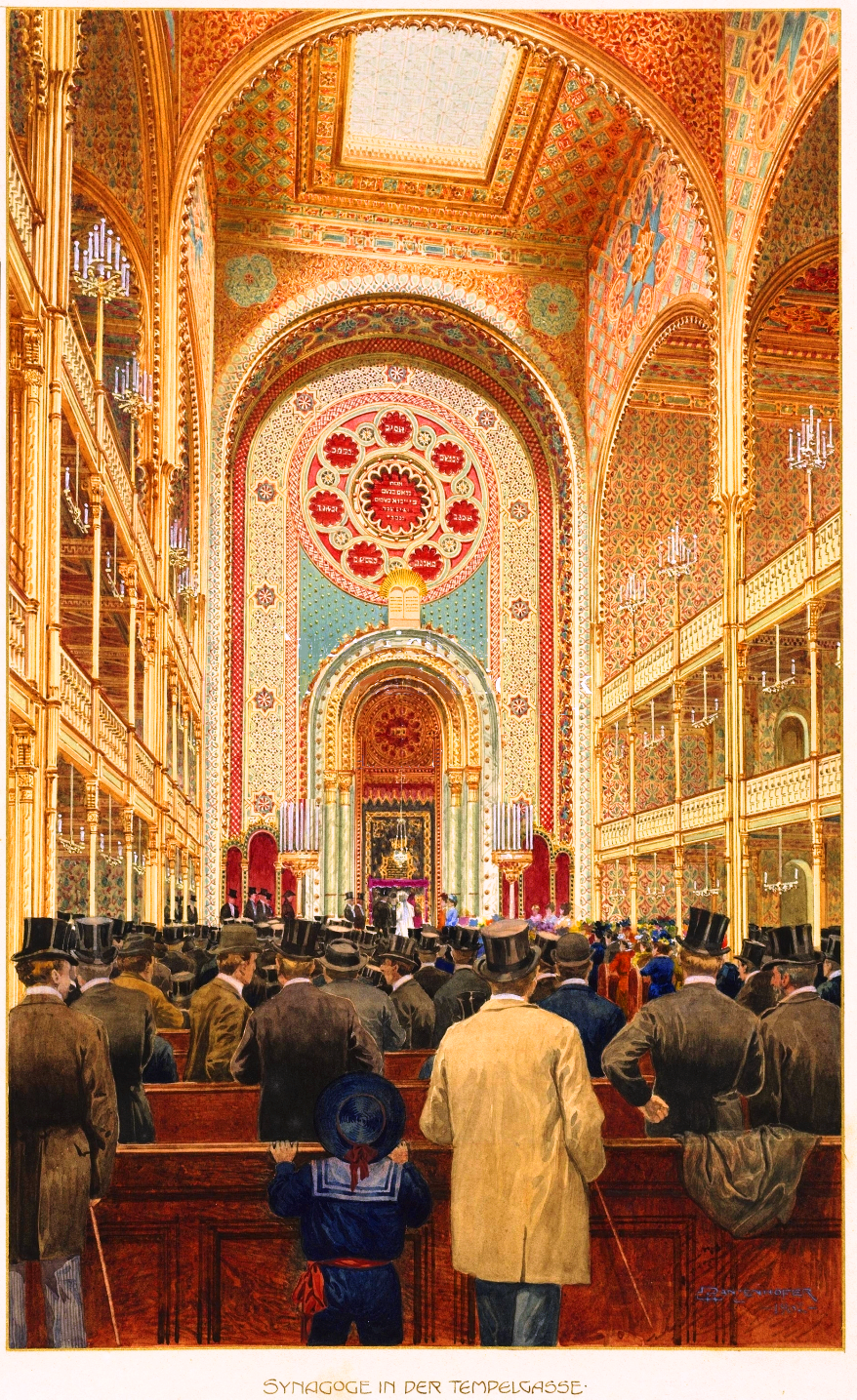
Inside view of the Leopoldstädter Tempel. Aquarelle by Emil Ranzenhofer

The Leopoldstädter Tempel, also known as the Israelitische Bethaus in der Wiener Vorstadt Leopoldstadt, (lit. "Israelite prayer house in the Vienna suburb of Leopoldstadt") was a Jewish congregation and synagogue, located on Tempelgasse 5, in Leopoldstadt, in the 2nd district of Vienna, Austria. Completed in 1858, the synagogue was destroyed as a result of Kristallnacht. A monument marks the location of the former synagogue.

== History ==
The congregation was established in c. 1810. Designed by Ludwig Förster in the Moorish Revival style, the synagogue was completed in 1858 and was the largest synagogue in Vienna. Fuerster's design incorporated spaces for 2,240 sitting and 1,500 standing worshipers. The complex included a mikveh, meeting room and lodging for community officials. The tripartite façade of the Leopoldstädter, with its tall central section flanked by lower wings on each side, became the model for numerous Moorish Revival synagogues, including the Choral Temple in Bucharest, which has an almost identical main façade; and several other synagogues.

This temple was destroyed during Kristallnacht on November 10, 1938.

A monument marks the location of the former synagogue, together with a memorial plaque that reads in German (and Hebrew):

Hier befand sich der Leopoldstädter Tempel, der im Jahre 1858 nach Plänen von Architekt Leopold Förster im maurischen Stil errichtet und am 10. November 1938 in der sogenannten "Reichskristallnacht" von den nationalsozialistischen Barbaren bis auf die Grundmauern zerstört wurde.

— Israelitische Kultusgemeinde Wien

translated as:

Here stood the Leopoldstädter Temple, built in 1858 in the Moorish style according to the plans of architect Leopold Förster, all but the foundation of which was completely destroyed by National Socialist barbarians on the so-called "Night of Broken Glass" on 10 November 1938.

== Design influence ==
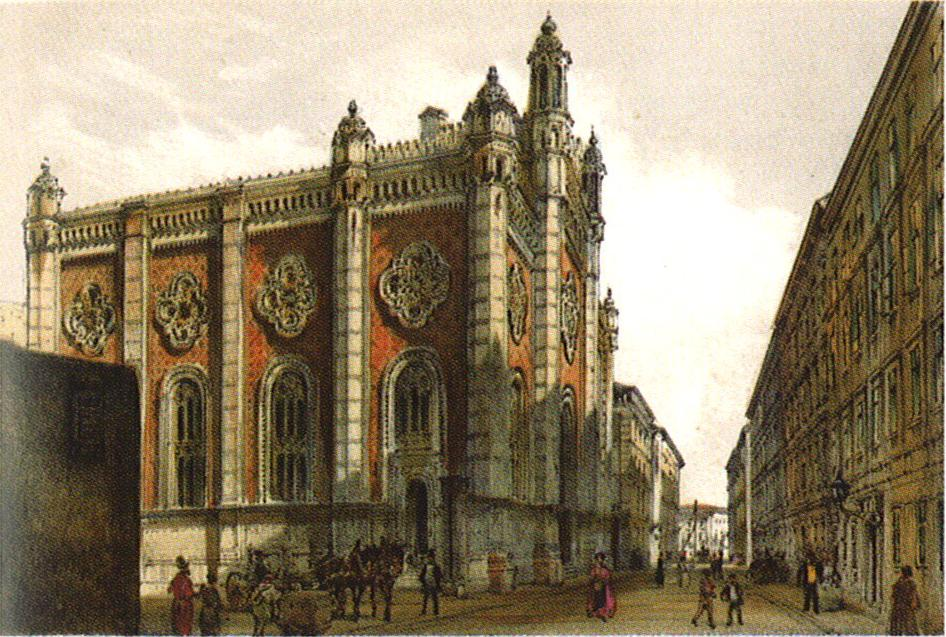
The Leopoldstädter Tempel, painted by Rudolf von Alt

The Tempel, which housed a prestigious congregation in the capital of the Austrian Empire, inspired the construction of several other synagogues in the Moorish Revival style. Some are designed similarly to Förster's building, with a flat façade and roof, tripartite massing with a large central block, symmetrical decorative minarets, and internal basilica plan with balconies.

The design of the following synagogues were influenced by Förster's design of the Leopoldstädter Tempel:

- Sofia Synagogue, Sofia, Bulgaria
- Zagreb Synagogue, Croatia
- Spanish Synagogue, Prague, Czech Republic
- Dohány Street Synagogue, Budapest, Hungary
- Vercelli Synagogue, Vercelli, Italy
- Tempel Synagogue, Kraków, Poland
- Choral Temple, Bucharest, Romania
- Grand Synagogue of Edirne, Turkey
- Brodsky Choral Synagogue, Kyiv, Ukraine
- Great Choral Synagogue, Kyiv, Ukraine
- Plum Street Temple, Cincinnati, Ohio, United States

== Notable members ==
- Josef Goldstein, a former cantor at the synagogue
- Moritz Güdemann, a former rabbi at the synagogue
- Adolf Jellinek, a former rabbi at the synagogue
- Israel Taglicht, a former rabbi at the synagogue

== Memorials ==
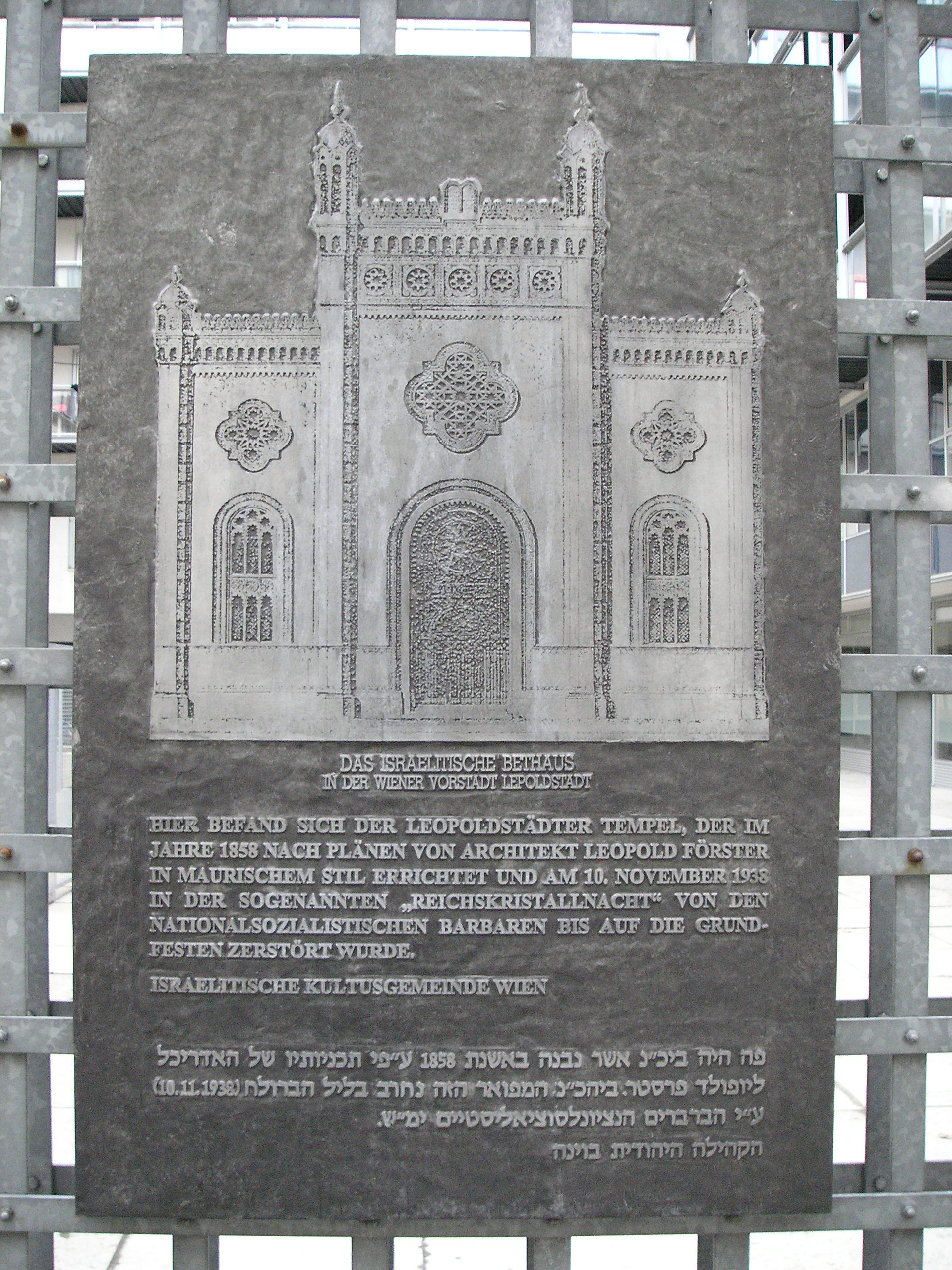
Memorial plaque at the site of the synagogue

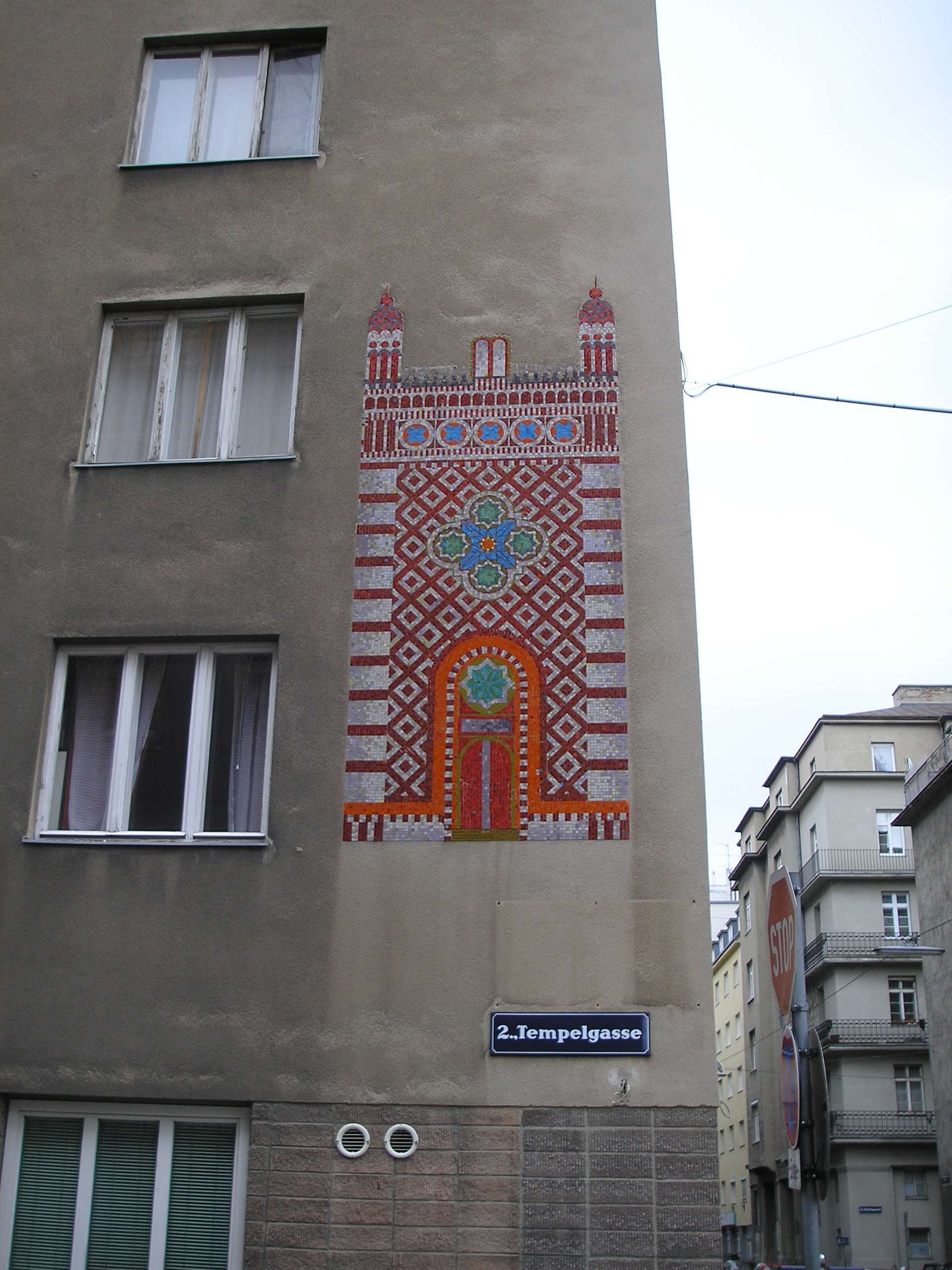
Memorial mosaic at Tempelgasse

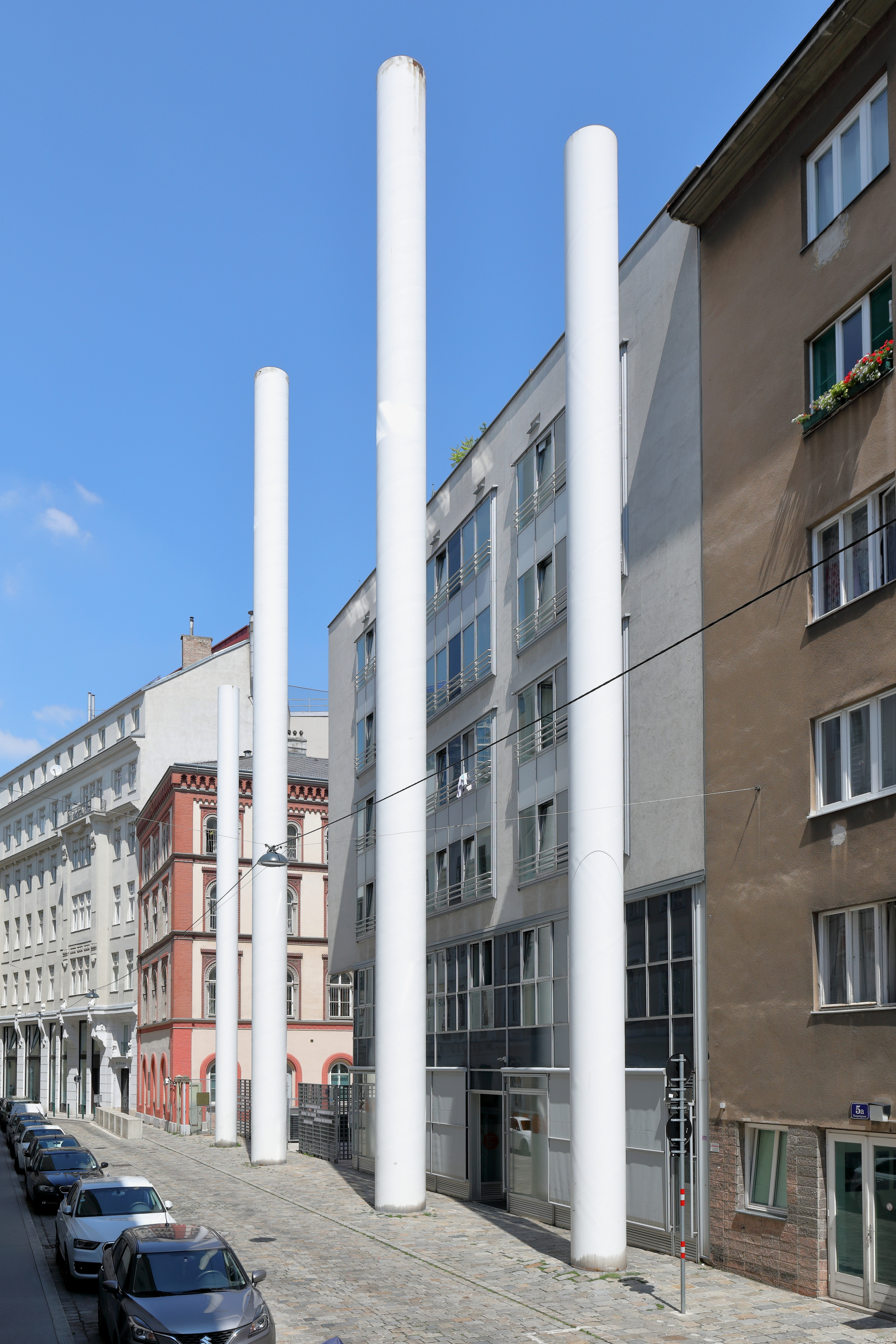
Monument showing the size of the synagogue

== See also ==
- History of the Jews in Vienna
