= Isaiah Sonne =

- Born: February 26, 1887; Mościska, Austrian-Hungarian Empire
- Died: November 27, 1960 (aged 73); Cincinnati, United States

Academic work
- Discipline: Jewish history

Isaiah Sonne, sometimes also Isaia Sonne, (February 16, 1887 – November 27, 1960) was a Jewish historian and bibliographer. Born in Galicia in 1887, he was educated in Switzerland and Italy, spending much of his career in the latter country as a teacher at Jewish colleges. After the implementations of the Italian Racial Laws in 1938, Sonne migrated to the United States where he taught at the Hebrew Union College in Cincinnati, where he died in 1960.

Sonne made considerable contributions to the Wissenschaft des Judentums.

== Biography ==
Sonne was born in Mościska, Galicia, then part of the Austrian-Hungarian Empire, on 26 February 1887 and was educated in Switzerland and Italy, receiving a Rabbinical degree there in 1925.

He taught, for a short time, at Łódź but moved to Florence, Italy in 1925 to teach Rabbinical literature and the Talmud at the Rabbinic College there, the Collegio Rabbinico. Apart from teaching he also engaged in research into the Jewish history in Italy.

In the mid-1930s Sonne became the first to compile a partial catalogue of the Biblioteca della Comunità Israelitica, looted by the Nazis in October 1943 and never recovered. Sonne, however, complained that he was allowed to see only the second-best items in the library.

From 1936 to 1938 he taught on the island of Rhodes, then part of the Kingdom of Italy, as the director of the Jewish Theological Seminar there, a post subsidised by the Italian government with the aim of spreading Italian culture. Sonne's aim, while on Rhodes, was to bridge the gap of knowledge between Eastern and Western Jews and, in the words of Salo Wittmayer Baron, "infuse the Levantine Jewry with the Wissenschaft des Judentums".

After the implementation of the Anti-Semitic Italian Racial Laws in 1938 Sonne lost his post and emigrated to the United States by 1940.

He became a professor of the Hebrew Union College in Cincinnati, where he died on 27 November 1960.

== Publications ==
Sonne published in four languages, English, German, Italian and Hebrew, on a wide range of subjects stretching from biography to rabbinics and philosophy, with his contribution to the Wissenschaft des Judentums on the subject of Renaissance history the most noted.

Selected works:

- Spinoza und die juedische Philosophie des Mittelalters (in German, 1925)
- Expurgation of Hebrew books--the work of Jewish scholars : a contribution to the history of the censorship of Hebrew books in Italy in the sixteenth century (1943)
- The paintings of the Dura synagogue (1947)
