= Heinrich Zirndorf =

German poet, playwright, and rabbi (1829-1893)

- Born: Heymann Zirndorfer; 7 May 1829; Fürth, Kingdom of Bavaria, German Confederation
- Died: 17 December 1893 (aged 64); Cincinnati, Ohio, United States
- Writing career
- Language: German

Heinrich Zirndorf (May 7, 1829 – December 17, 1893) was a German poet, playwright, and rabbi.

== Biography ==
Heinrich Zirndorf was born as Heymann Zirndorfer (Yiddish: חיים צירנדארפער) in Fürth, Bavaria, in 1829. He received a private early education. His parents intended for him to pursue a commercial career, and for a short time he was employed as a clerk by a local business. His early studies of German and English classics, however, inspired him to continue studying.

At the age of nineteen, he relocated to Munich, where he attended the gymnasium until 1855. The following two years he spent in Vienna, where he worked as an assistant teacher and librarian in the city's Jewish school. He focused primarily on poetry during this period, composing some of his best verses. Notably, his tragedy in five acts, Kassandra, was published in Vienna in 1856. In 1857, he secured the role of rabbi in Liptau-Sankt-Nikolaus, Hungary. However, he soon resigned and moved to Frankfurt, where he made the acquaintance of the historian Isaac Marcus Jost. Zirndorf later chronicled these reminiscences in Isaak Markus Jost und Seine Freunde (1886).

In 1860, Zirndorf published a collection of his poems in Leipzig. That September, he accepted an invitation to serve as a teacher in England. He spent thirteen years there, first in Hull and Manchester, then in London. He returned to Germany in April 1873 as the rector of the Hebrew Teachers' Institute in Münster. Three years later, he accepted an offer to become the rabbi of the Congregation Beth-El in Detroit, Michigan.

In 1884, Zirndorf assumed the position of a history professor at the Hebrew Union College in Cincinnati. Around this period, Zirndorf began contributing to Die Deborah, eventually becoming its associate editor. He was appointed rabbi and preacher of the Ahabath Achim congregation in Cincinnati in 1889, a position he held until his death.

== Selected publications ==
- Kassandra: Trauerspiel in fünf Akten (in German). Vienna: Josefine Reck. 1856.
- Der Lehrberuf in Israel (in German). Frankfurt: C. Adelmann. 1859.
- Gedichte (in German). Leipzig: Arnoldische Buchhandlung. 1860.
- Ueber jüdisch-religiöse Bildung im Seminare der Gegenwart (in German). Münster: Jos. Krick. 1875.
- Isaak Markus Jost und seine Freunde: Ein Beitrag zur Kulturgeschichte der Gegenwart (in German). New York: Bloch Publishing Co. 1886.
- Some Jewish Women. Philadelphia: Jewish Publication Society of America. 1892. Translation of sketches previously published in Die Deborah.
