= Wissenschaft des Judentums =

German Jewish academic movement

"Wissenschaft des Judentums" (literally in German the expression means "science of Judaism"; more recently in the United States it started to be rendered as "Jewish studies" or "Judaic studies", a wide academic field of inquiry in American universities) refers to a nineteenth-century movement premised on the critical investigation of Jewish literature and culture, including rabbinic literature, to analyze the origins of Jewish traditions.

== Society for Jewish Culture and Jewish Studies ==
The first organized attempt at developing and disseminating Wissenschaft des Judentums was the Verein für Kultur und Wissenschaft der Juden (Society for Jewish Culture and Jewish Studies), founded around 1819 by Eduard Gans (a pupil of Hegel), and his associates. Other members included Heinrich Heine, Leopold Zunz, Moses Moser, and Michael Beer (youngest brother of Giacomo Meyerbeer). It was an attempt to provide a construct for the Jews as a Volk or people in their own right, independent of their religious traditions. As such it sought to validate their secular cultural traditions as being on an equal footing with those adduced by Johann Gottfried Herder and his followers for the German people. Immanuel Wolf's influential essay Über den Begriff einer Wissenschaft des Judentums (On the Concept of Jewish Studies) of 1822, has such ideas in mind. Its principal objective, as it was then defined in the Zeitschrift für die Wissenschaft des Judentums (1822), was the study of Judaism by subjecting it to criticism and modern methods of research.

The failure of the Society, which was attributable largely to the far greater attraction amongst German Jews of identification with German culture, was followed by the conversion to Christianity of many of its leading figures, including Gans and Heine. The Society was dissolved in 1824.

== The Wissenschaft des Judentums movement ==
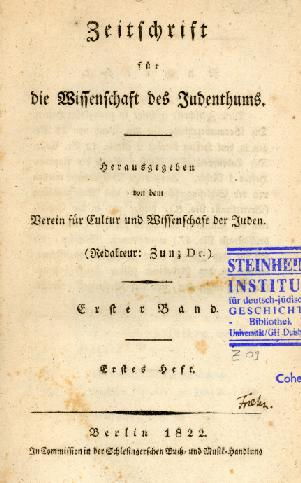
First edition from 1822

Despite the lack of success of the Verein für Kultur und Wissenschaft der Juden, its principles inspired many Jewish thinkers to invest their efforts in a wider Wissenschaft des Judentums movement, and also provoked a conservative reaction (see Opposition). The historian Amos Elon, in his book The Pity of It All, places the movement in the context of anti-Semitic riots in Germany in 1819. The purpose, Elon writes, "was to bring ordinary Jews into the orbit of German Kultur [culture] and at the same time reinforce their Jewish identity by bridging the gulf between secular and religious education"; the movement sought to explore Judaism as "both secular civilization and religion", and thereby "help young Jews to remain Jews", even as they moved to a more secular view. According to Dr. Henry Abramson, the primary aim of the proponents of the movement was to articulate a modality of Jewish identity that was consonant with nineteenth century values, and where Jews had to demonstrate that they were patriotic members of their own societies, and at the same time express their Judaism proudly. The movement took on slightly differing characteristics in different national contexts so that, for example, the nature of the Anglo-Jewish movement was affected by the more ambivalent, less overtly hostile, state of Jewish-Christian relations in England; historical critical approaches to Bible were unpopular; a strong interest in rabbinic theology, liturgy, and prayer; an emphasis upon eccentricity, marginality, and challenges to normative rabbinic Judaism; and a widening of the scholarly franchise in England to women and non-established scholars.

=== Goals ===
Proponents of Wissenschaft des Judentums attempted to place Jewish culture on par with Western European culture, as evinced in Goethe's ideas of Bildung, and endeavored to have "Jewish Studies" introduced into the university curriculum as a respectable area of study, freeing the field from the prevailing bias that regarded Judaism as an inferior precursor to Christianity and studied it as such. They also developed and advocated a style of scholarship which allowed complete freedom in the interpretation of traditional texts, and which might be pursued without concerns about the practical ramifications such interpretations might have for religious observance and religious life (Glatzer 1964).

Leopold Zunz (1794–1886), one of the movement's leading figures, devoted much of his work to rabbinic literature. At the time, Christian thinkers maintained that the Jews' contribution ended with the Bible, and Zunz began to publish in the area of post-biblical rabbinic literature. His essays "Etwas über die rabbinische Literatur" and "Zur Geschichte und Literatur" addressed this issue. His biography of Rashi of Troyes was pivotal. When the Prussian government forbade preaching sermons in German synagogues, on the grounds that the sermon was an exclusively Christian institution, Zunz wrote History of the Jewish Sermon in 1832. This work has been described as "the most important Jewish book published in the 19th century". It lays down principles for the investigation of the Rabbinic exegesis (Midrash) and of the siddur (prayer-book of the synagogue).

=== Attitude toward religion ===
Despite the outstanding scholarship of Wissenschaft personalities such as Zunz and Heinrich Graetz (most of whom pursued their scholarly labors on their own time as Privatgelehrte), the Wissenschaft movement as a whole had a tendency to present Judaism as an historical relic with frequently apologetic overtones, and often ignored matters of contemporary relevance:

Zunz felt obliged to assume that Judaism had come to an end, and that it was the task of Wissenschaft des Judentums to provide a judicious accounting of the varied and rich contributions which Judaism had made to civilization. In a similar spirit, Steinschneider is said to have once quipped that Wissenschaft des Judentums seeks to ensure that Judaism will receive a proper burial, in which scholarship amounts to an extended obituary properly eulogizing the deceased.

Nevertheless, throughout most of its existence and despite certain of its most prominent practitioners, such as Moritz Steinschneider, being vocal opponents of religion, Wissenschaft des Judentums was very much a religious movement—pursued largely by rabbis at Jewish seminaries who were engaged in preparing their students for rabbinical careers. In a foreshadowing of the reform movement, Zunz often led services, which were accompanied by an organ, in the vernacular German, rather than Hebrew. Wissenschaft scholars such as Rabbi Zacharias Frankel, the first head of the Jewish Theological Seminary of Breslau, and his colleague at the seminary, historian Heinrich Graetz, considered Jewish history to be reflective of a divine revelation and guidance. Wissenschaft des Judentums was not restricted to progressive Judaism. In 1873, Israel Hildesheimer founded the neo-orthodox modern Rabbinerseminar in Berlin. One of its most prominent scholars, David Hoffmann, defended a literal reading of the Biblical word which he understood to be the exact product of divine revelation. It was this essentially religious nature of Wissenschaft des Judentums that made it even more dangerous in the eyes of its opponents. Christians even thought that a more liberal form of Judaism would attract converts, or would keep Jews from converting to Christianity, and so the government forced Zunz's synagogue to close.

=== Attitude toward earlier scholarship ===
The writings of many Wissenschaft scholars exhibit not only an intense love of scholarship "for its own sake", but also an interest in the rabbis and scholars of old, whose works they find themselves documenting, editing, publishing, analyzing, and critiquing. The majority of Wissenschaft practitioners are keen to take ownership of the Jewish scholarly tradition. They see themselves as the rightful heirs and successors to Saadia Gaon and Rashi and Hillel the Elder and Abraham ibn Ezra.

In the Wissenschaft approach to scholarship, then, the earlier generations of scholars become "de-sanctified" and "re-humanized". Wissenschaft scholars feel completely free to pass judgment on the intellectual and scholarly capacities of earlier scholars, evaluating their originality, competence, and credibility, and pointing out their failures and limitations. The Wissenschaft scholars, while respectful of their predecessors, have no patience for a concept such as yeridat ha-dorot. For them, the classical authorities are no more beyond dispute and critique than are contemporary scholars; the opinions of ibn Ezra and Steinschneider may be presented in the same sentence without any sense of impropriety, and either one may then be debunked with the same forwardness. No doubt this de-sanctification of the Jewish luminaries provided further grist for the opponents of the movement.

== Legacy ==
Although the Wissenschaft movement produced a vast number of scholarly publications of lasting value, and its influence still reverberates through Jewish Studies departments (and, indeed, some yeshivas) around the world, it is possible to regard the publication of the Jewish Encyclopedia in 1901–1906 as the culmination and final flowering of this era in Jewish studies (Levy 2002). The choice of English over German as the language for this epochal work is a further sign that an era of German scholarship was drawing to a close. In the early years of the new century the Wissenschaft culture and style of scholarship was transplanted to a certain extent to bodies such as the Institute for Jewish Studies at Hebrew University (e.g., Gershom Scholem) and Jewish Studies departments at American universities such as Brandeis and Harvard (e.g., Harry Austryn Wolfson).

== Opposition ==
The Wissenschaft movement drew criticism from traditional elements in the Jewish community, who regarded it as sterile at best, and at worst damaging to the religious community. A key opposition leader was Samson Raphael Hirsch. He and other traditional religious scholars representing urban and sophisticated Orthodox constituencies regarded the Wissenschaft movement as failing to meet the needs of the living Jewish community; Mendes-Flohr observes in this context that historians, by virtue of their craft, necessarily "transform traditional knowledge, draining it of its sacral power". The Orthodox orientation of Wissenschaft figures such as David Zvi Hoffmann did not spare them from Hirsch's condemnation.

== Guttmann and his Philosophie des Judentums ==
Julius Guttmann is best known for Die Philosophie des Judentums (Reinhardt, 1933), translations of which are available in Hebrew, Spanish, English, Japanese, etc. The English title is The Philosophy of Judaism: The History of Jewish Philosophy from Biblical Times to Franz Rosenzweig (New York, 1964).

Roth sees in this publication "the last product in the direct line of the authentic Judaeo-German 'Science of Judaism'" (more commonly known as Wissenschaft des Judentums). While the movement did not utterly expire with the publication Guttman's work—its spirit living on in the work of G. Scholem and H.A. Wolfson among many others—it is certainly the case that the Wissenschaft movement in Germany had by the 1930s already ceased to thrive.

The original German edition of Philosophie des Judentums ends with Hermann Cohen, the primary influence on Guttman's own philosophy, while the later Hebrew edition includes Franz Rosenzweig. It is also notable that Guttman's work excludes major thinkers of the Kabbalistic school, which reflects his own attitude toward Jewish philosophy.

== List of Wissenschaft des Judentums personalities ==
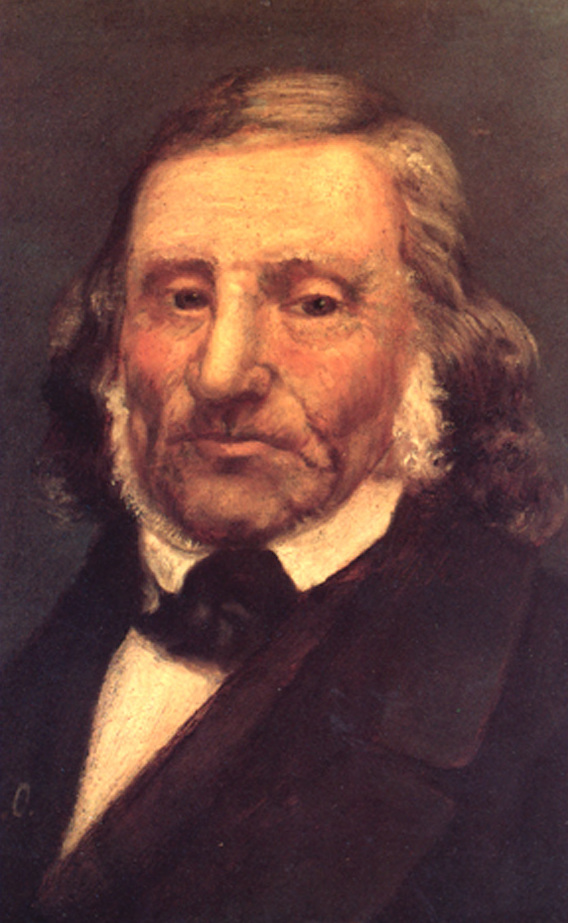
Leopold Zunz (1794–1886), a founder of the Verein für Wissenschaft des Judentums

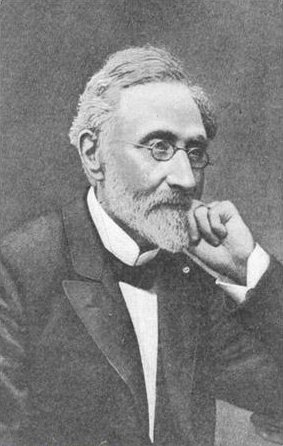
Heinrich Graetz, (1817–1891): his magnum opus History of the Jews was written in the spirit of Wissenschaft des Judentums.

- Hermann Cohen
- Wilhelm Bacher
- Eduard Gans
- Heinrich Graetz
- Julius Guttmann
- Heinrich Heine
- David Zvi Hoffmann
- Moses Moser
- Solomon Judah Loeb Rapoport
- Solomon Schechter
- Moritz Steinschneider
- Leopold Zunz
- Samuel David Luzzatto
- Ismar Elbogen
- Isaiah Sonne

== See also ==
- Hochschule für die Wissenschaft des Judentums
- Jewish Theological Seminary of Breslau
- Jewish Theological Seminary of America
- Leo Baeck College
- Rabbinical Seminary of Budapest
- Jewish Theological Seminary of Vienna
- Jewish studies
- Sociology of Jewry
