= Tyrrhena Terra =

Terra on Mars

Tyrrhena Terra is a large area on Mars, centered south of the Martian equator and immediately northeast of the Hellas basin. Its coordinates are 14.8°S 90°E, and it covers 2300 km at its broadest extent. It was named for a classic albedo feature of the planet and is in the Mare Tyrrhenum quadrangle of Mars. Tyrrhena Terra is typical of the southern Martian terrae, with heavily cratered highlands and other rugged terrain. It contains the large volcano Tyrrhena Patera, one of the oldest volcanoes on Mars. Its largest crater is Herschel. Licus Vallis and the Ausonia Montes are other major features in the region. Some channels and dunes are visible in Tyrrhena Terra, as shown in the images below.

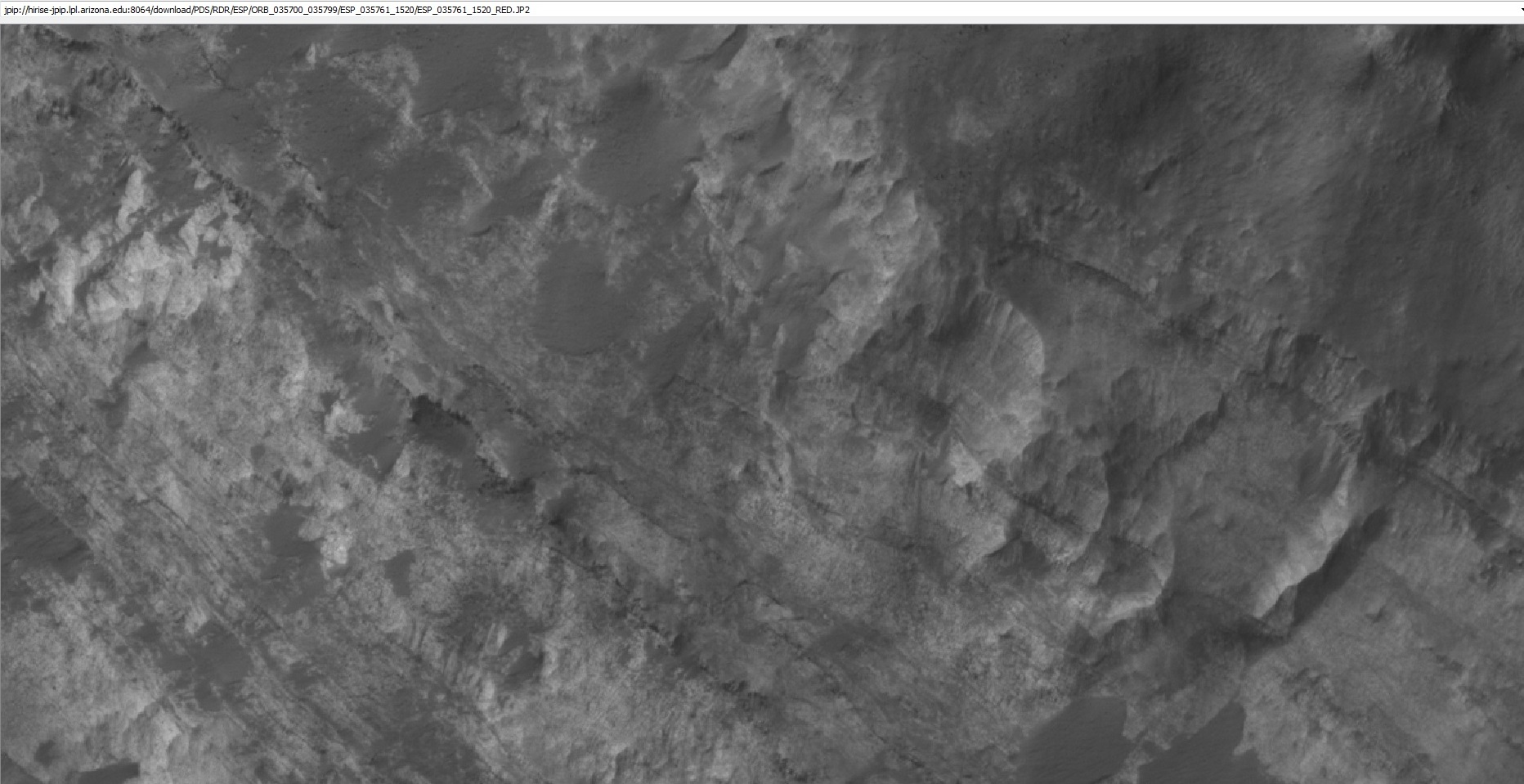
Layers in a valley East of Terby Crater, as seen by HiRISE under HiWish program. Location is Iapygia quadrangle.

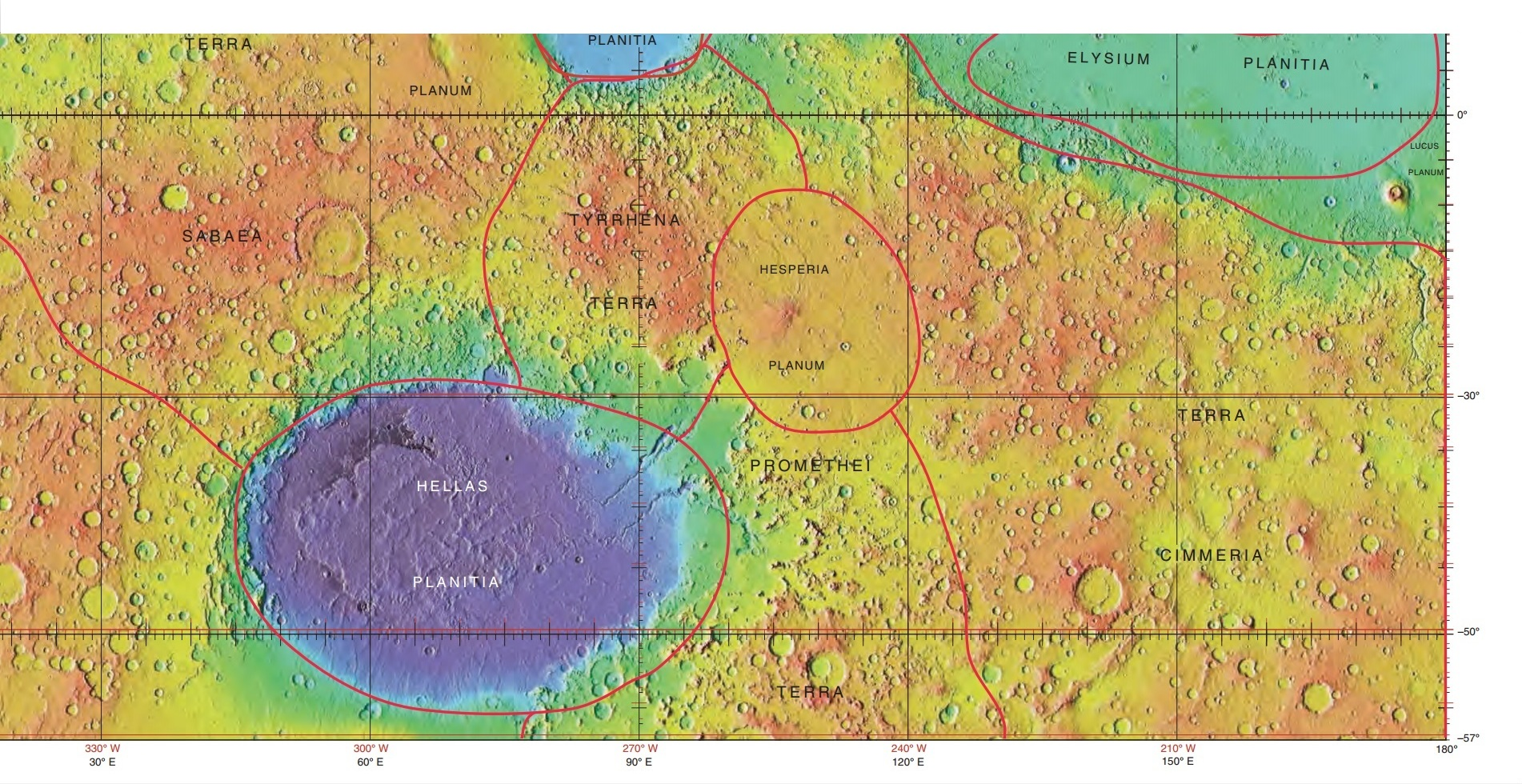
MOLA map showing boundaries of Tyrrhena Terra and other nearby regions
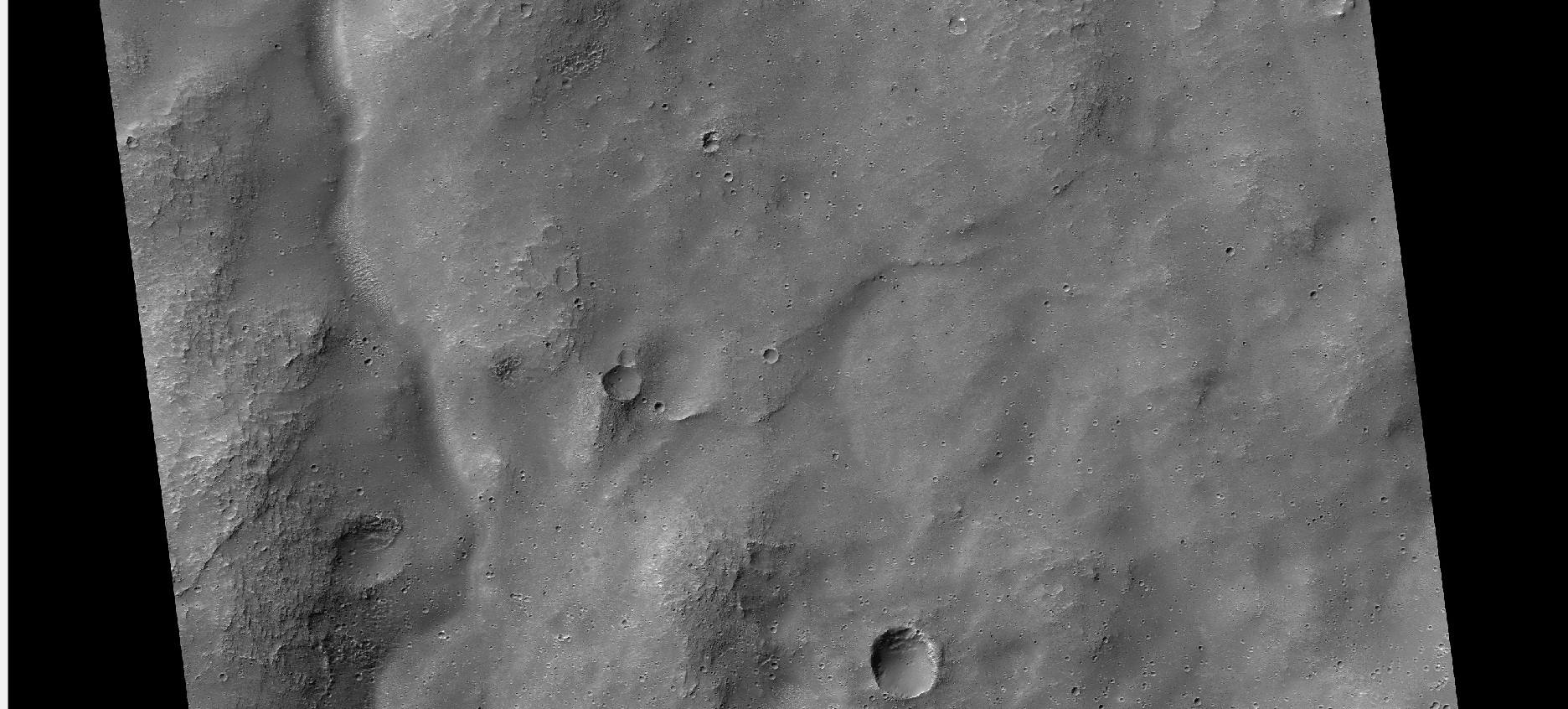
Channel in Ausonia Mensa, as seen by HiRISE under the HiWish program

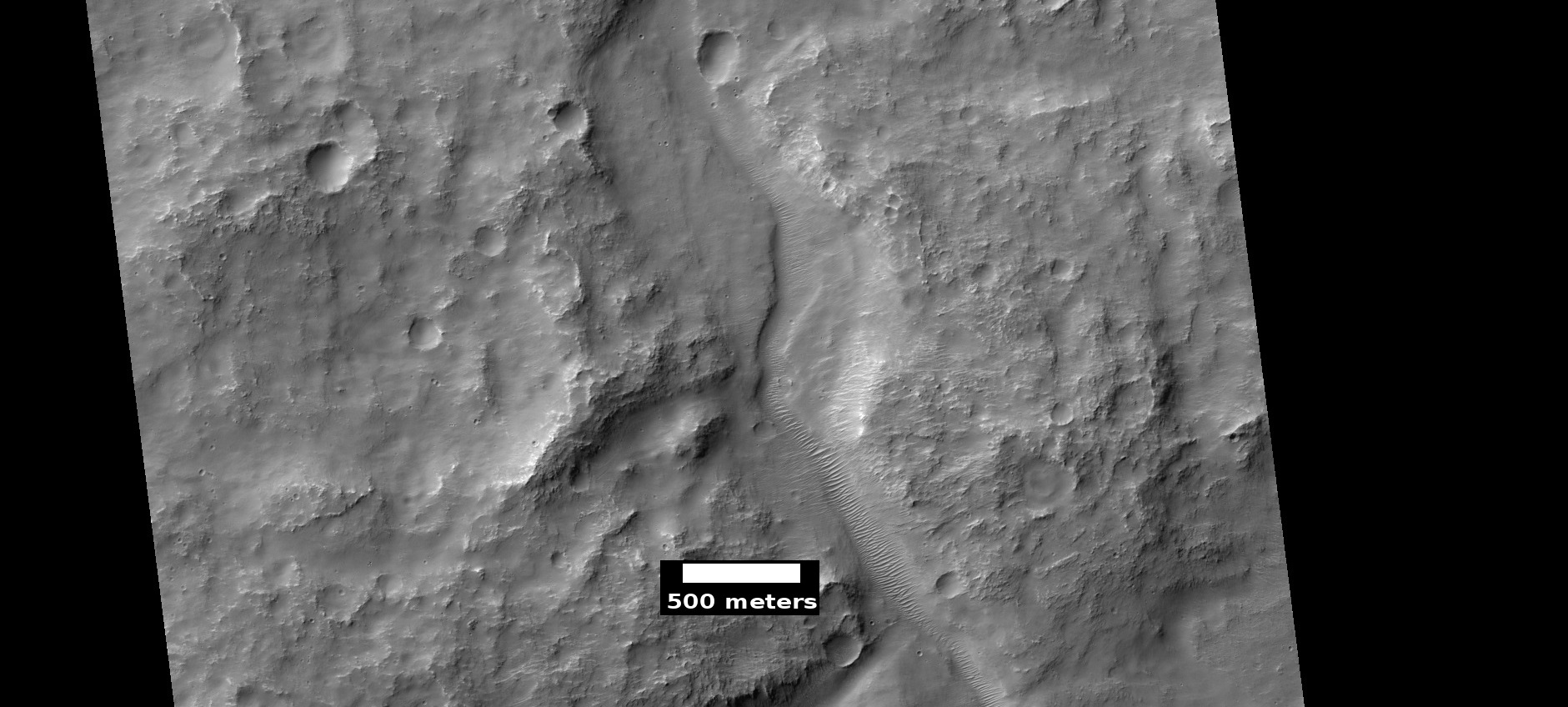
Channel within a larger channel, as seen by HiRISE under HiWish program

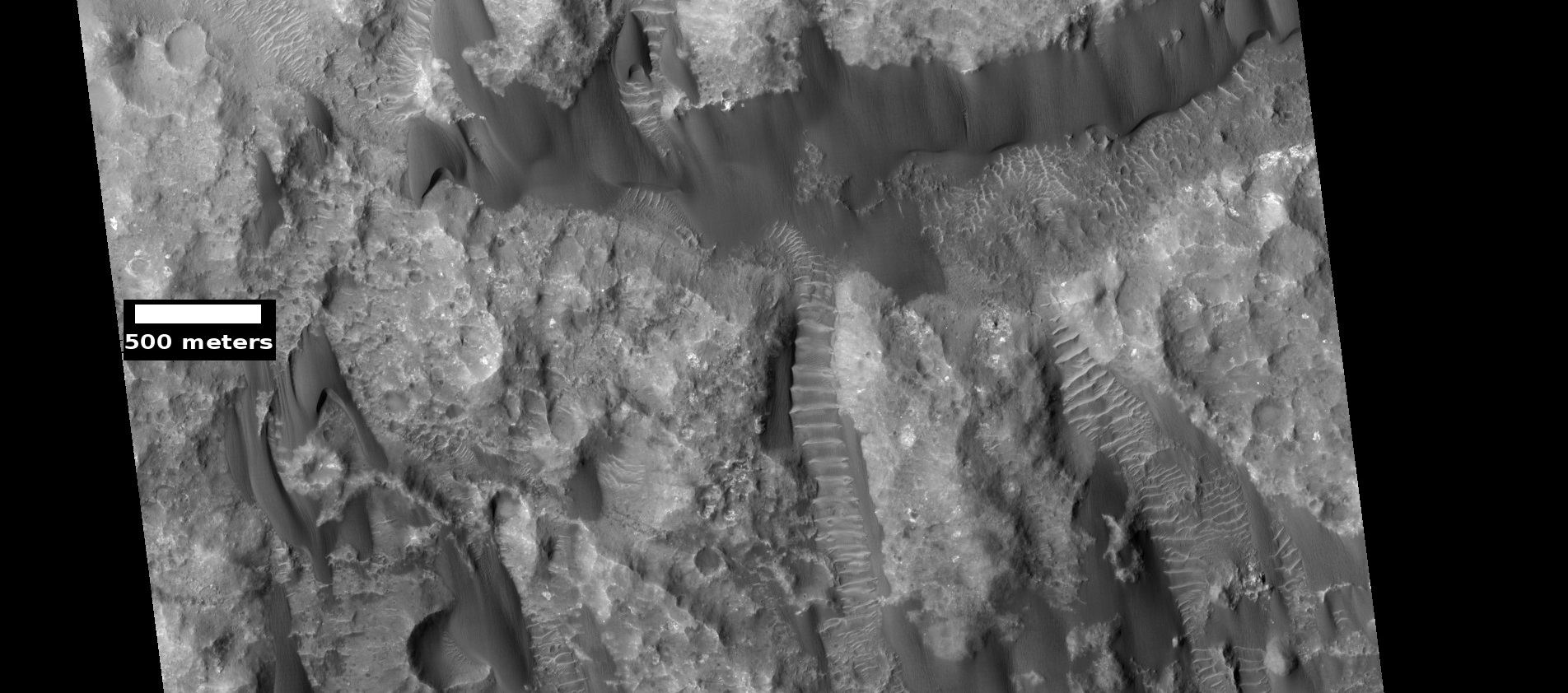
Dunes in crater, as seen by HiRISE under HiWish program.

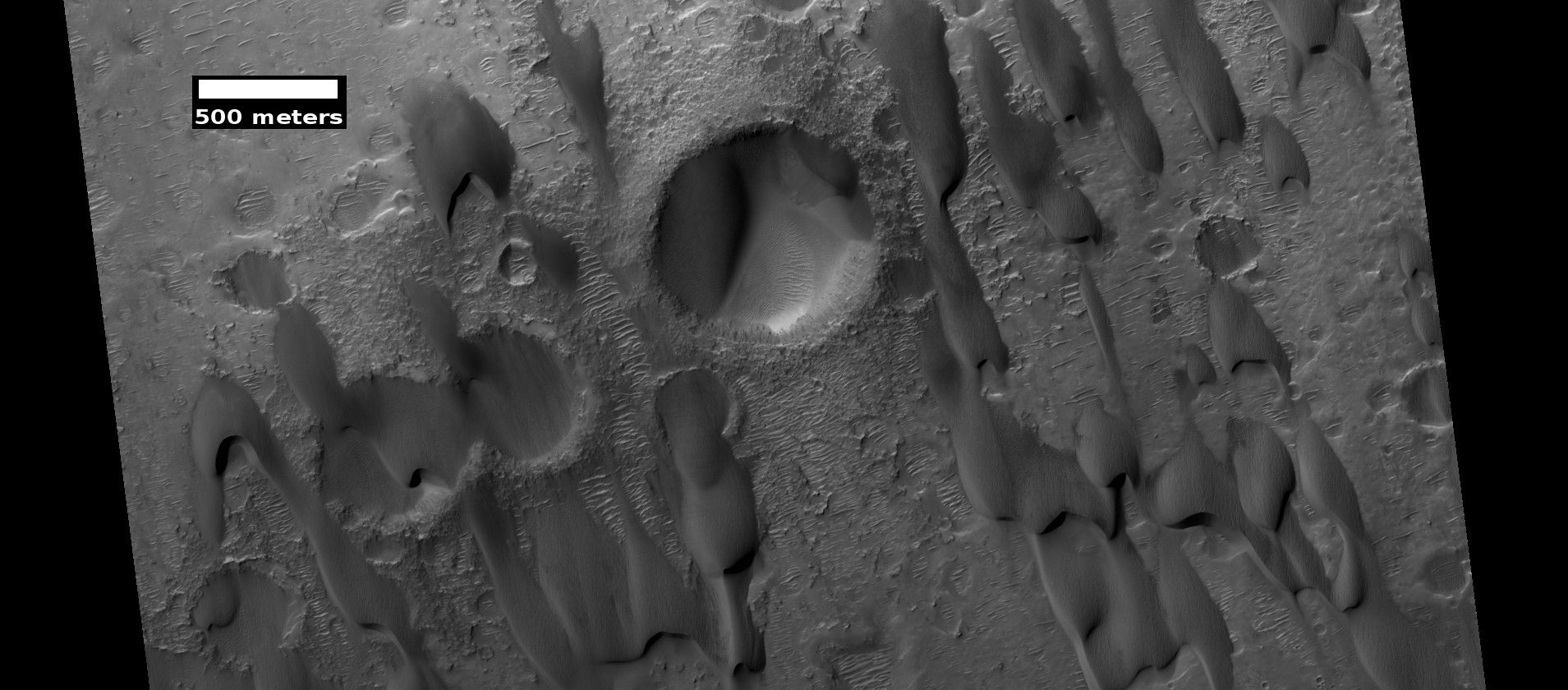
Dunes among craters, as seen by HiRISE under HiWish program.

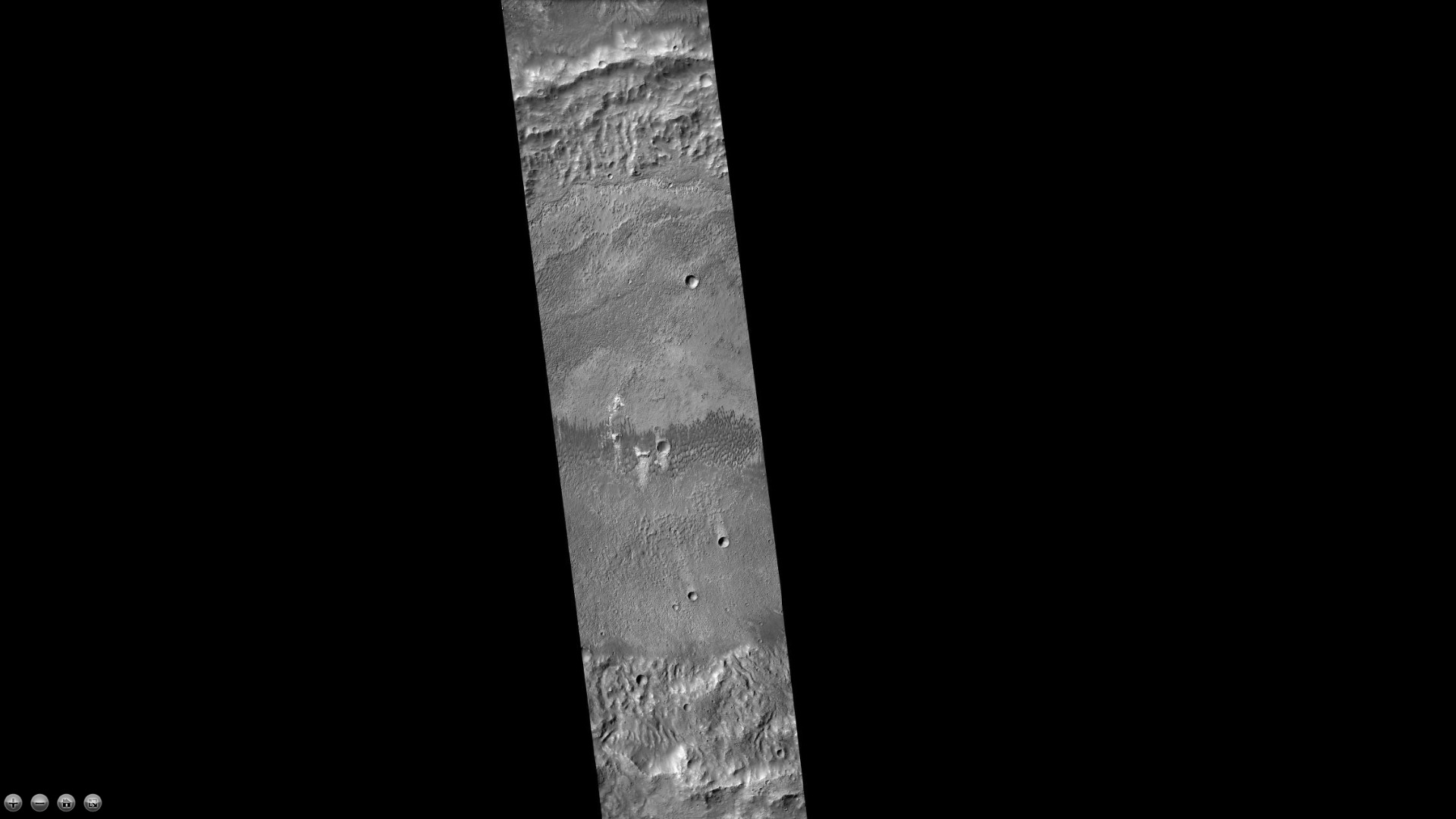
Briault Crater, as seen by CTX camera (on Mars Reconnaissance Orbiter).

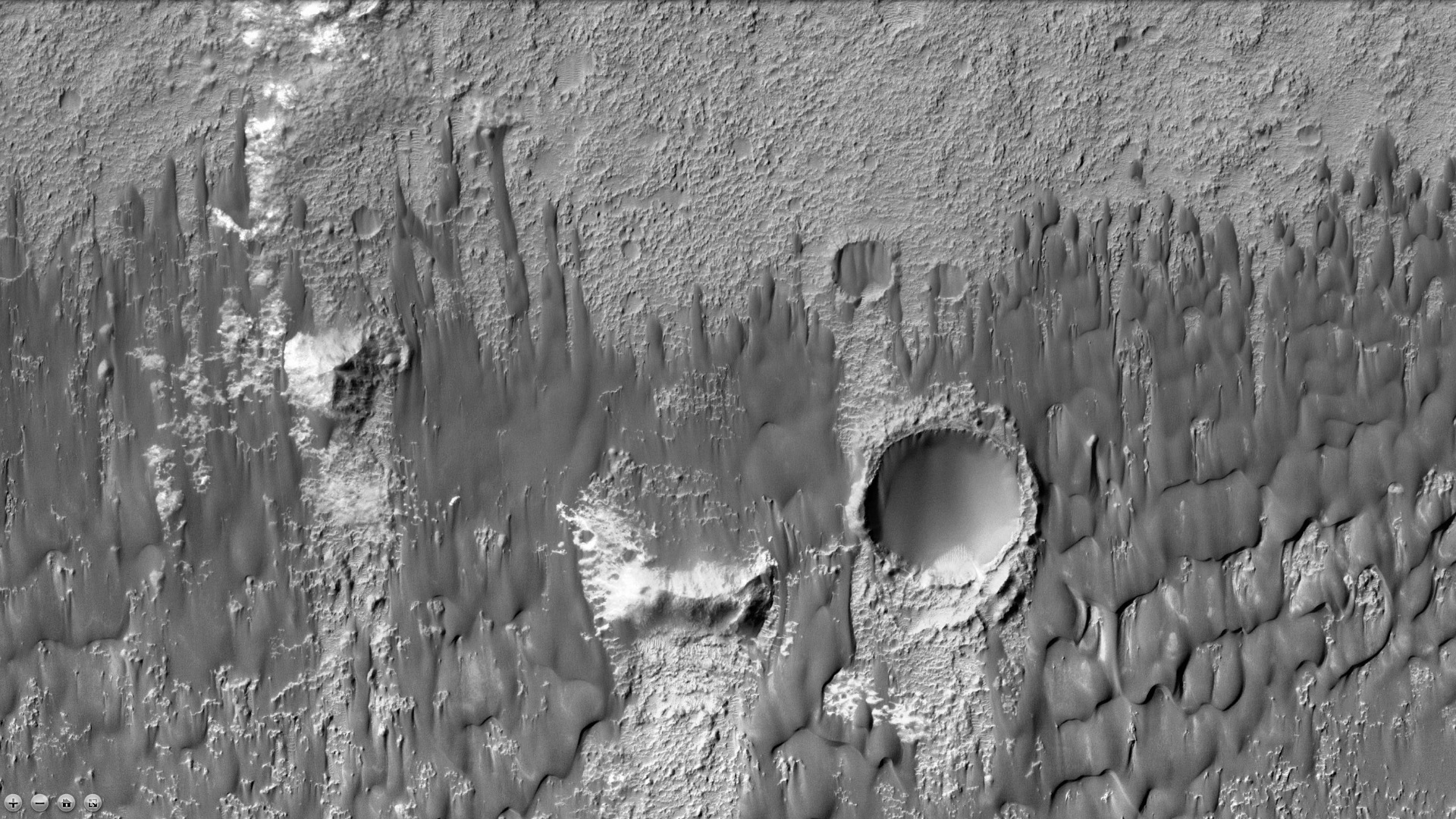
Dunes on the floor of Briault Crater, as seen by CTX camera (on Mars Reconnaissance Orbiter). Note: this is an enlargement of the previous image of Briault Crater.

== Dunes ==
When there are perfect conditions for producing sand dunes, steady wind in one direction and just enough sand, a barchan sand dune forms. Barchans have a gentle slope on the wind side and a much steeper slope on the lee side where horns or a notch often forms. Some of the dunes in the pictures above are barchans. Barchan is a Russian term because this type of dune was first seen in the desert regions of Turkistan.

== Columnar Jointing ==
Lava flows sometimes cool to form large groups of more-or-less equally sized columns. These joints have been seen on Mars.

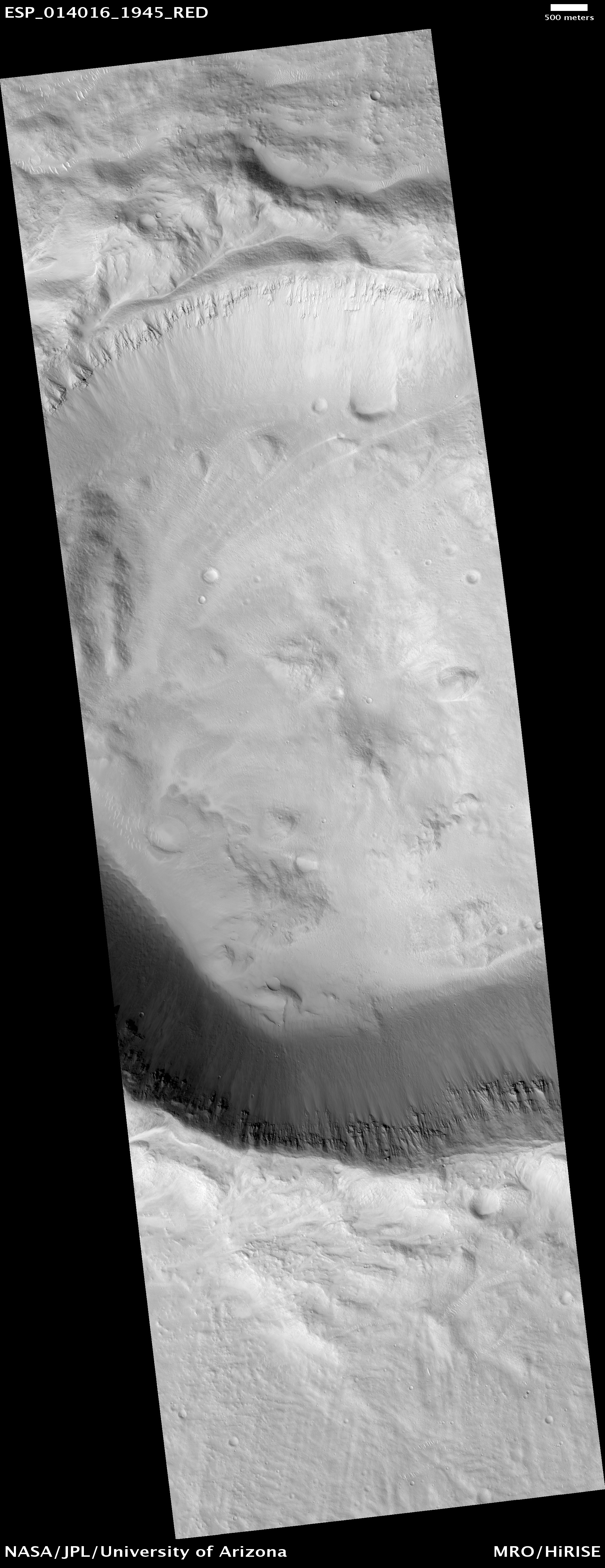
Wide view of crater that has columnar jointing that is visible in enlarged images that follow Picture taken with HiRISE.

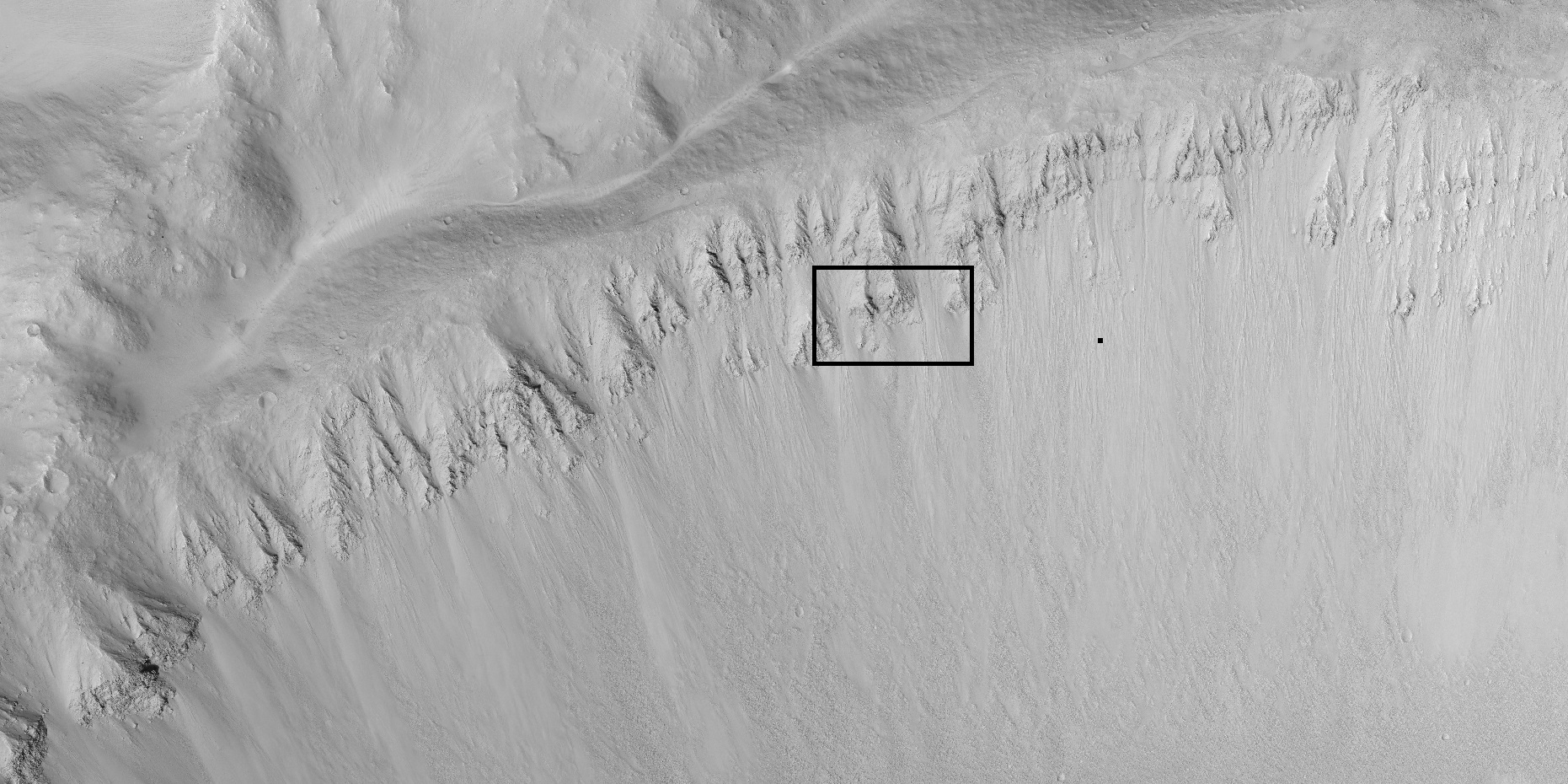
Crater wall with columnar jointing in the location of the box Columnar joints are easily seen in the enlarged image that follows. Picture taken with HiRISE.

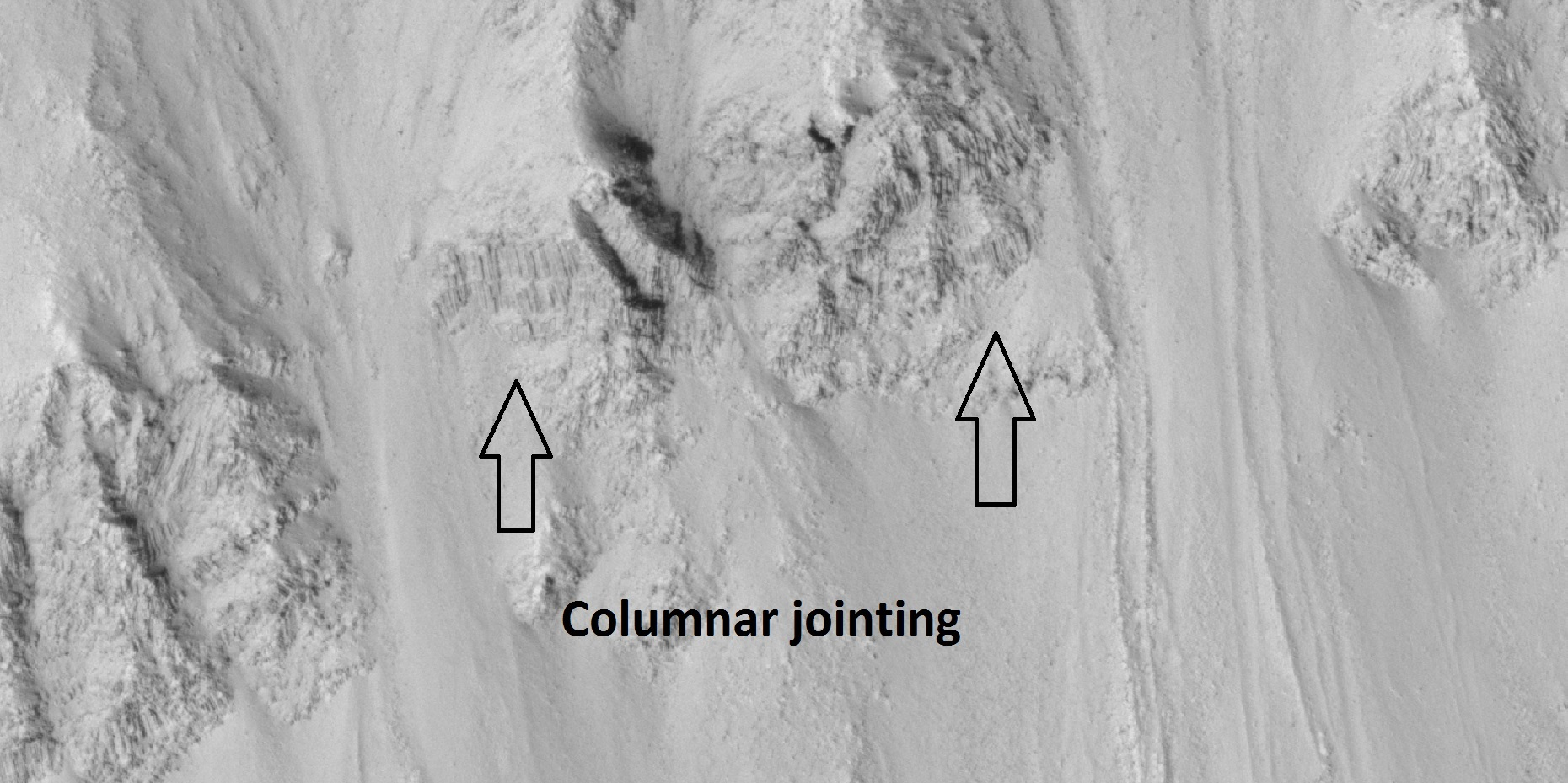
Close view of crater wall with columnar jointing labeled Picture taken with HiRISE.

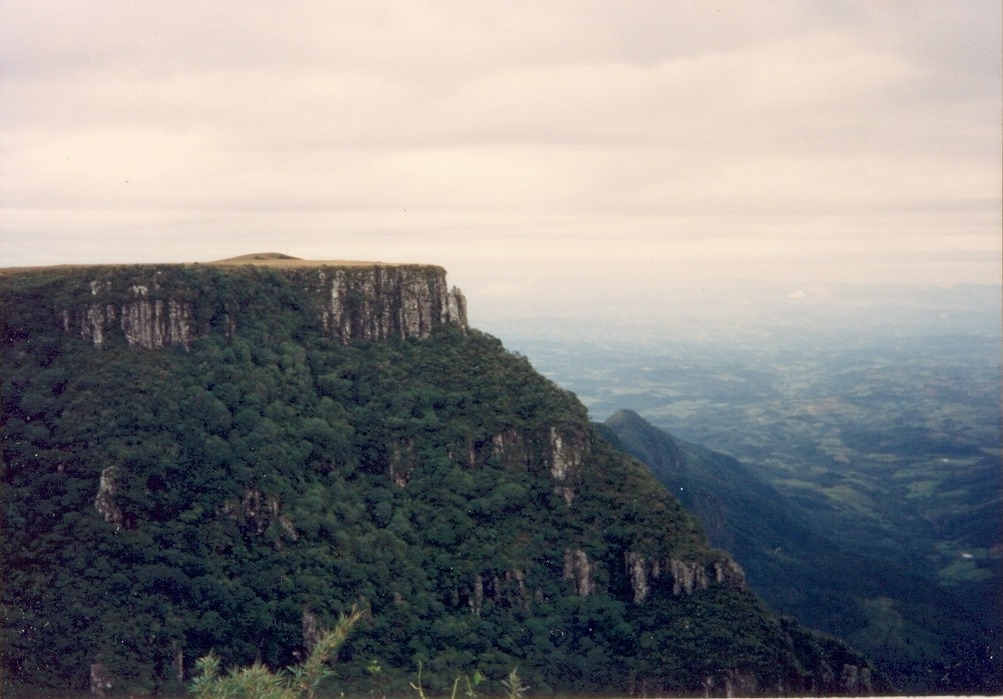
Columnar jointing on the Earth.

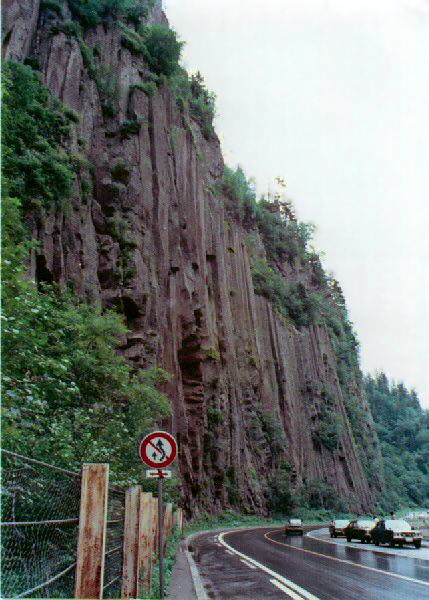
Columnar jointing on the Earth.

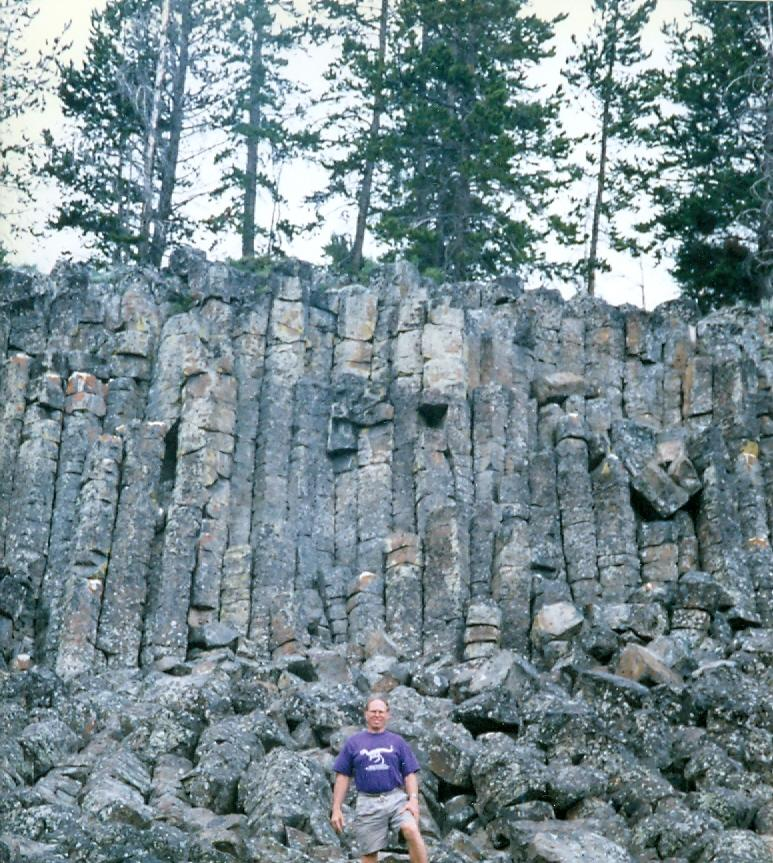
Columnar Jointing in Yellowstone National Park.

== See also ==
- Climate of Mars
- Columnar jointing
- Geology of Mars
- Barchan
