= Hesperia Planum =

Broad lava plain in the southern highlands of the planet Mars

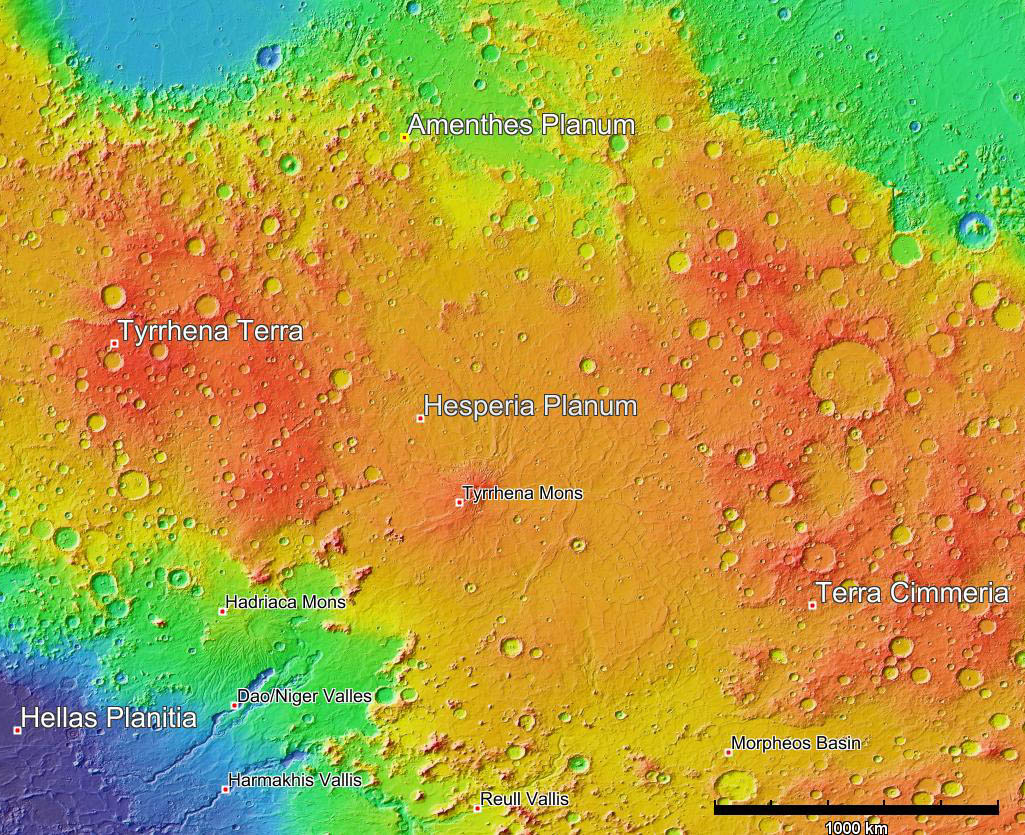
- MOLA colorized relief map of Hesperia Planum region. Hesperia Planum has fewer impact craters than the surrounding Noachian highlands of Tyrrhena Terra and Terra Cimmeria. This indicates that the plain is younger than its more heavily cratered surroundings.
- Feature type: Lava plain
- Location: Mare Tyrrhenum quadrangle, Mars
- Coordinates: 21°25′S 109°53′E
- Diameter: ~1 600 km
- Eponym: Poetic Hesperia

Hesperia Planum is a broad lava plain in the southern highlands of the planet Mars. The plain is notable for its moderate number of impact craters and abundant wrinkle ridges. It is also the location of the ancient volcano Tyrrhena Mons (Tyrrhena Patera). The Hesperian time period on Mars is named after Hesperia Planum.

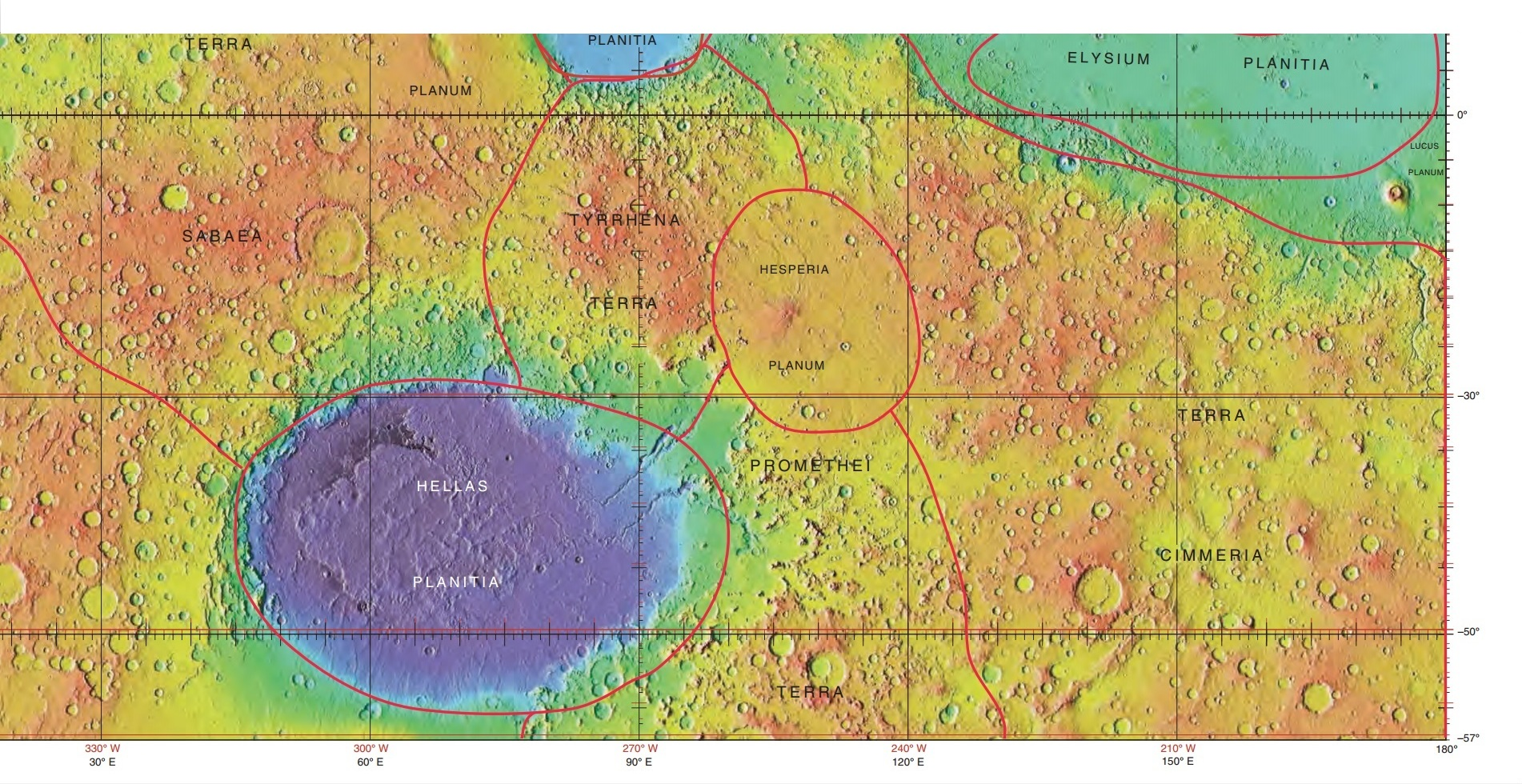
MOLA map showing exact boundaries of it and other regions. Color indicates elevation.

== Name origin ==
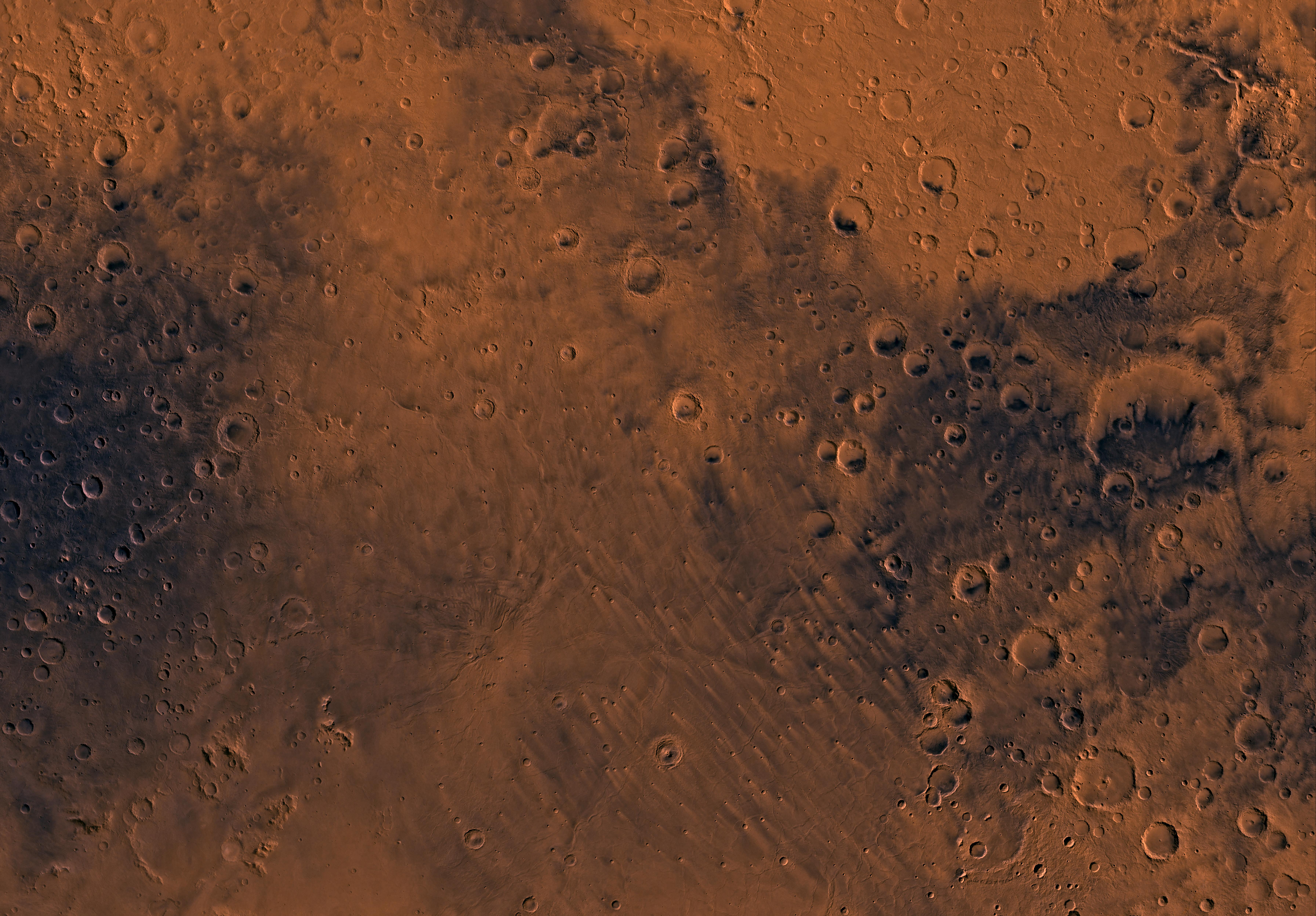
Viking MDIM of Mare Tyrrhenum quadrangle. Hesperia is the intermediate-toned (dusky) region (left of center) lying between the darker regions Mare Tyrrhenum (left) and Mare Cimmerium (right).

Most place names on Mars are derived from sources in the Bible or classical antiquity. Hesperia is a Greco-Latin poetic term for "lands to the west," which to the ancient Greeks and Romans meant Italy, while Spain was referred as Hesperia Ultima. Planum (pl. plana) is Latin for plateau or high plain. It is a descriptor term used in planetary geology for a relatively smooth, elevated terrain on another planet or moon.

The Hesperia region of Mars was named by Italian astronomer Giovanni Schiaparelli in 1877 for an intermediate-toned albedo feature centered at lat. 20°S, long. 240°W between two darker regions. Believing the dark areas were bodies of water, Schiaparelli interpreted Hesperia to be a floodplain or marsh bridging two adjacent seas, the Mare Tyrrhenum and Mare Cimmerium. Although the existence of seas on Mars had been discounted by the early 20th century, the true nature of the region remained obscure until the space age. In 1972, the Mariner 9 spacecraft showed that Hesperia was a cratered, wind-streaked plain. The International Astronomical Union (IAU) formally named the area Hesperia Planum in 1973. The dark areas flanking Hesperia Planum were found to be heavily cratered uplands. In 1979, the IAU designated the upland area to the west as Tyrrhena Terra and to the east as Terra Cimmeria. (Terra is a Latin descriptor term meaning land or continent.)

== Location and physical description ==
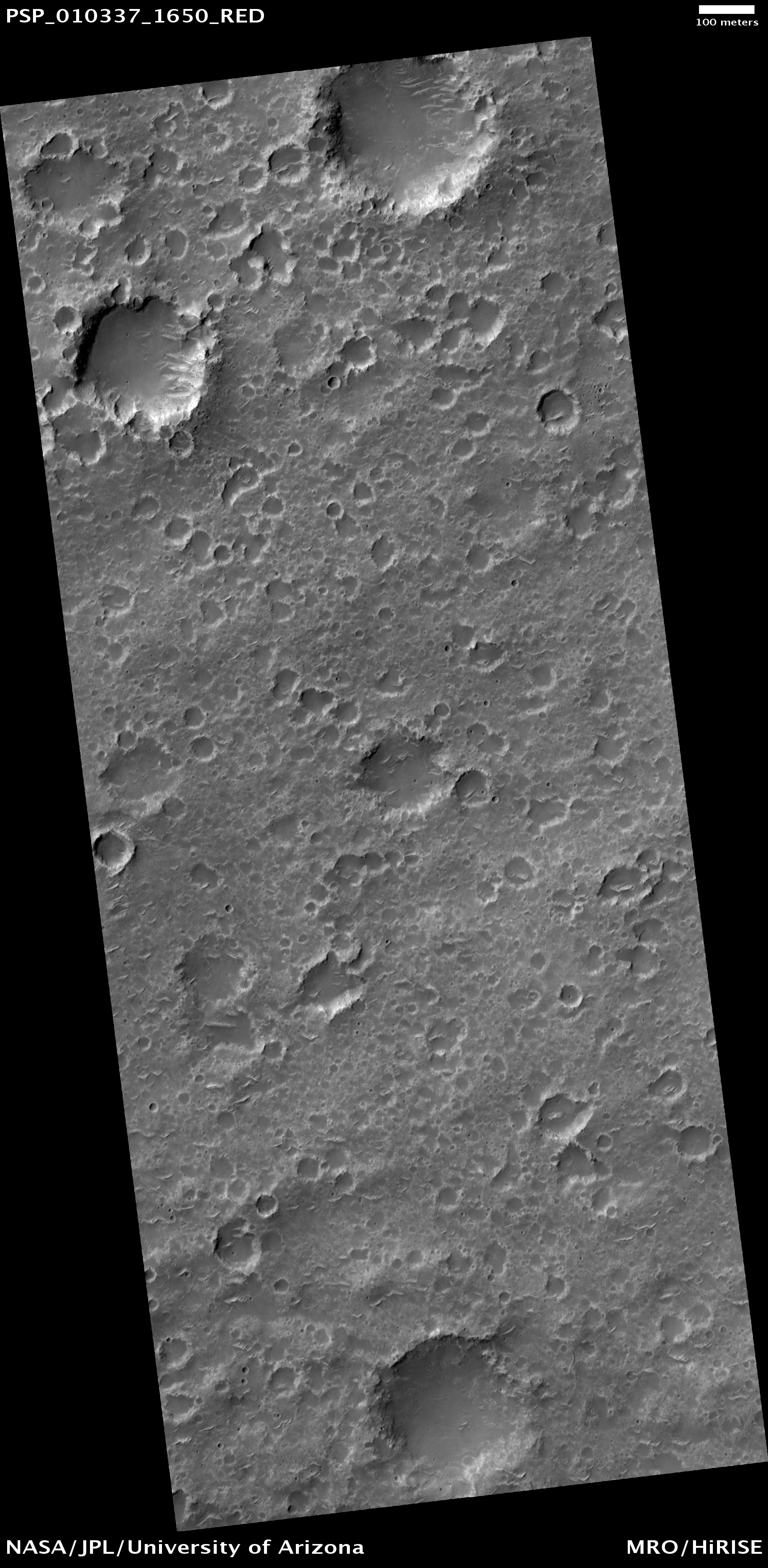
Closeup of the surface of northwestern Hesperia Planum, as seen by HiRISE camera on Mars Reconnaissance Orbiter (MRO).

Hesperia Planum is located along the broad northeastern rim of the giant Hellas impact basin and is centered at lat. 22.3°S, long. 110°E in the Mare Tyrrhenum quadrangle (MC-22). A small part of this region in the south is found in the Hellas quadrangle. It has a maximum width of 1,700 km (1,100 mi) and covers an area of about 2 million km^{2} (770,000 sq mi).

At large scales (>100 m or 330 ft), Hesperia Planum appears smooth and level, having a relatively uniform surface elevation of 1.2 km (0.75 mi) above Mars datum. The plain's surface is 200–800 m (660–2,620 ft) lower in elevation than the surrounding uplands of Tyrrhena Terra and Terra Cimmeria and is slightly tilted to the south, with a mean regional slope of about 0.03°. In high-resolution images (<19 m or 62 ft/pixel), the surface of Hesperia Planum is dominated by dust and fine-grained deposits. Few boulders or bedrock outcrops are visible. Abundant, shallow craters filled with smooth, flat-lying deposits are common. No vents or volcanic constructs are identifiable, although small (<10s meters wide) channels are present.

== Geology ==
Hesperia Planum is generally interpreted to be composed of flood lavas, although layered volcaniclastic or lacustrine (lake-bed) sediments cannot be ruled out. The lavas appear to partly fill a large, irregular topographic depression that existed in Noachian times. The rims of pre-existing impact craters are still visible in places, indicating that the lava deposits are 250–500 m in thickness. The volume of lavas within Hesperia Planum is comparable to that found in large igneous provinces on Earth, such as the Columbia River Basalt Group.

=== Impact cratering and age ===
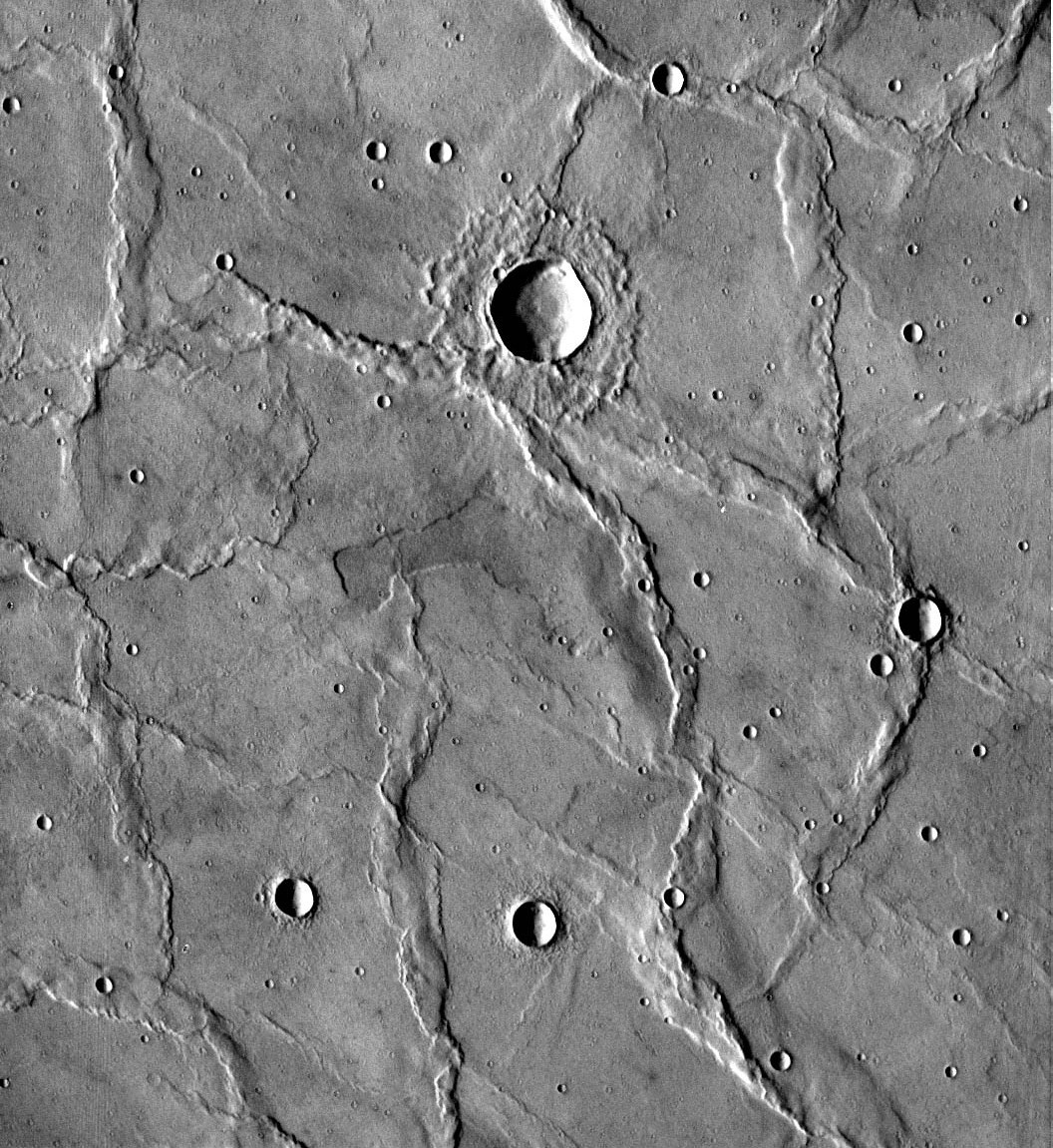
Viking orbiter view of wrinkle ridges in Hesperia Planum. North is at upper left. Image is about 107 km (66 mi) across.

The moderate amount of cratering on Hesperia Planum indicates that the plain has an intermediate age in Martian history. In planetary geology, the number density of impact craters is a measure of the relative age of a planetary surface. Heavily cratered surfaces are old, and sparsely cratered surfaces are young. Hesperia Planum is the type locality for the Hesperian System and time period. The lavas making up Hesperia Planum define the base of the Hesperian System. They erupted at the beginning of the Hesperian Period around 3700 million years ago. (Mars itself, along with the other planets, formed about 4500 million years ago.) Hesperian lavas are younger than the rocks in the heavily cratered Noachian terrains but older than rocks formed during the more recent Amazonian Period. (See Geology of Mars.)

=== Wrinkle ridges ===
Wrinkle ridges are long, linear topographic highs with a distinctive morphology that consists of a low, broad arch topped by a narrow crenulated ridge (pictured left). They are common features on the Moon where they occur exclusively within lava flow plains (the lunar maria). Their occurrence on Mars is thought to reflect a similar volcanic association. Thus, areas on Mars with abundant wrinkle ridges are interpreted as plains formed by very fluid basaltic lava (flood basalts). The ridges themselves are believed to be the surface expression of thrust faults formed after the lava flows were emplaced. They are not volcanic features, but secondary, tectonic structures that form in dense, competent rocks (such as layered basalts) that have undergone compressional stress. Hesperian-aged "ridged plains" like Hesperia Planum cover about 30% of the Martian surface.

=== Tyrrhenus Mons ===
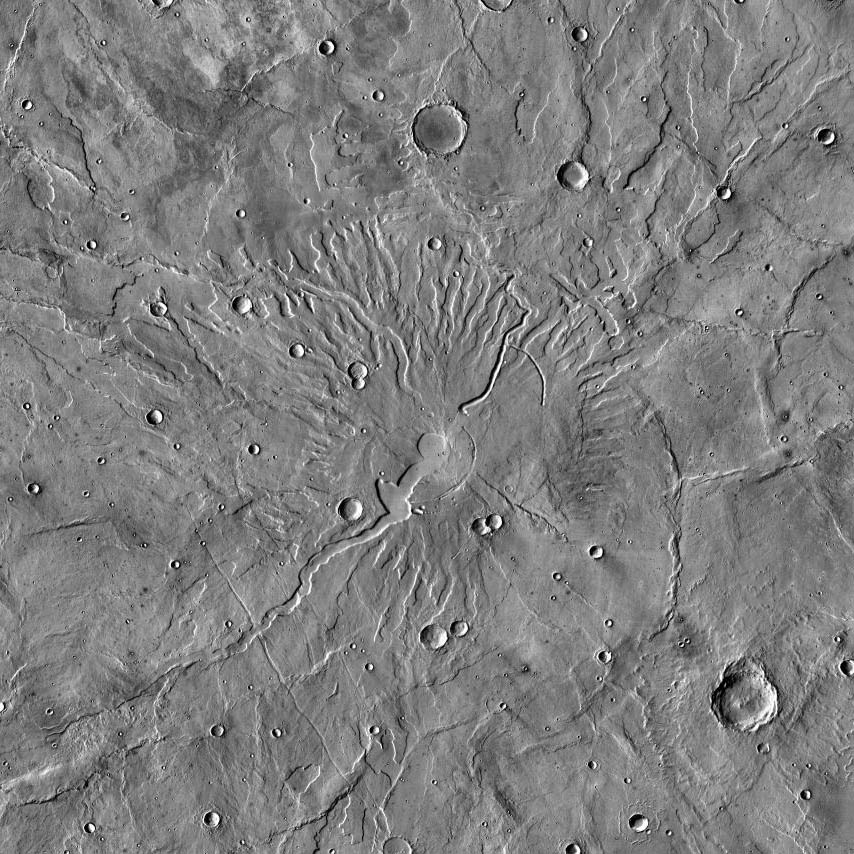
THEMIS daytime IR mosaic image of Tyrrhenus Mons. This ancient, eroded volcano was nicknamed the Dandelion when first seen in Mariner 9 images.

Tyrrhenus Mons (Tyrrhena Patera) is an eroded, low-lying volcano in the western part of Hesperia Planum. It is one of the oldest large central-vent volcanoes on the planet and a member of a class of volcanoes called highland paterae, which erupted mainly in the Late Noachian and Early Hesperian. Tyrrhenus Mons stands only 1.5 km above the surrounding plains. At its center lies a 40 km diameter depression, or caldera, from which radiate numerous flat-floored valleys and ridges that suggest the volcano has been highly eroded. The low relief of Tyrrhenus Mons combined with its degraded state indicate the volcano consists largely of friable and easily eroded material such as volcanic ash. The ash was likely derived from the interaction of magma with groundwater or ice.

=== Dunes ===
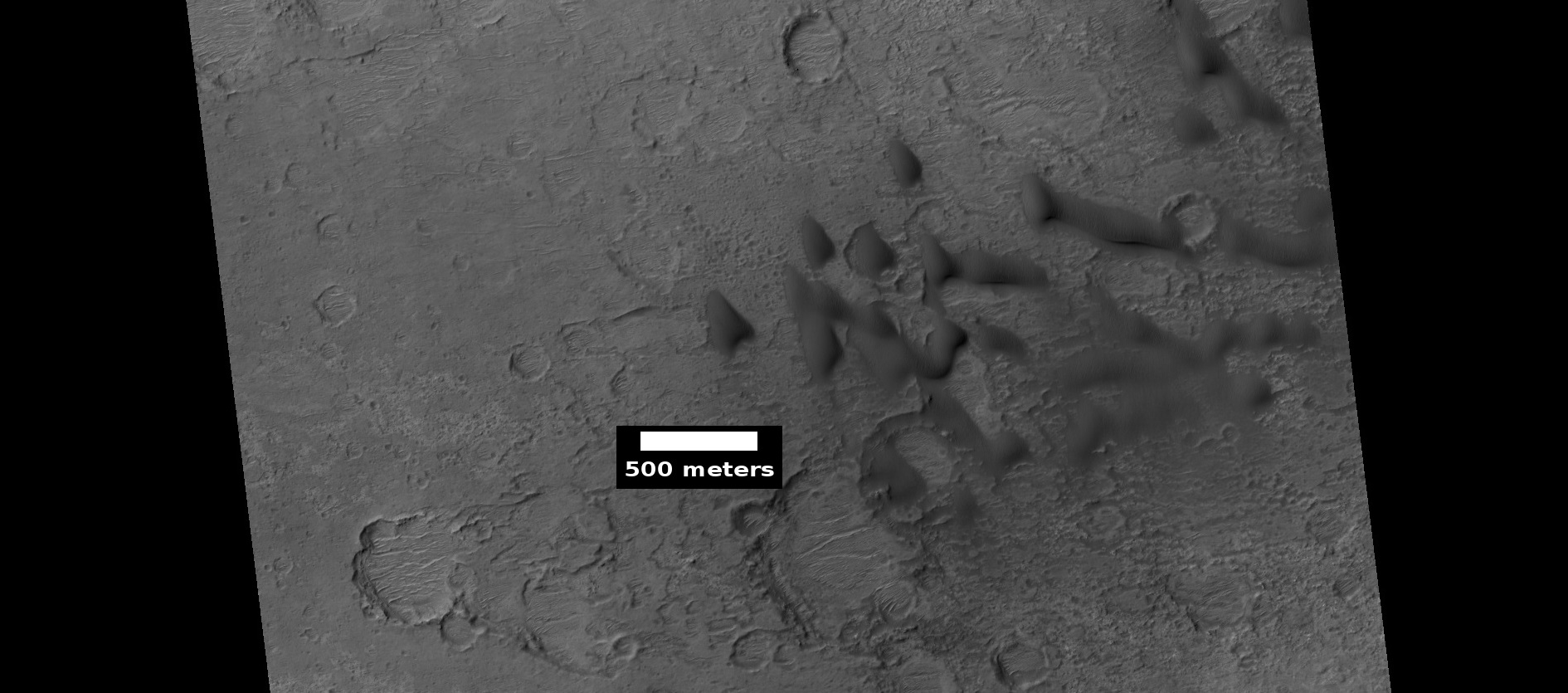
Dunes, as seen by HiRISE under HiWish program

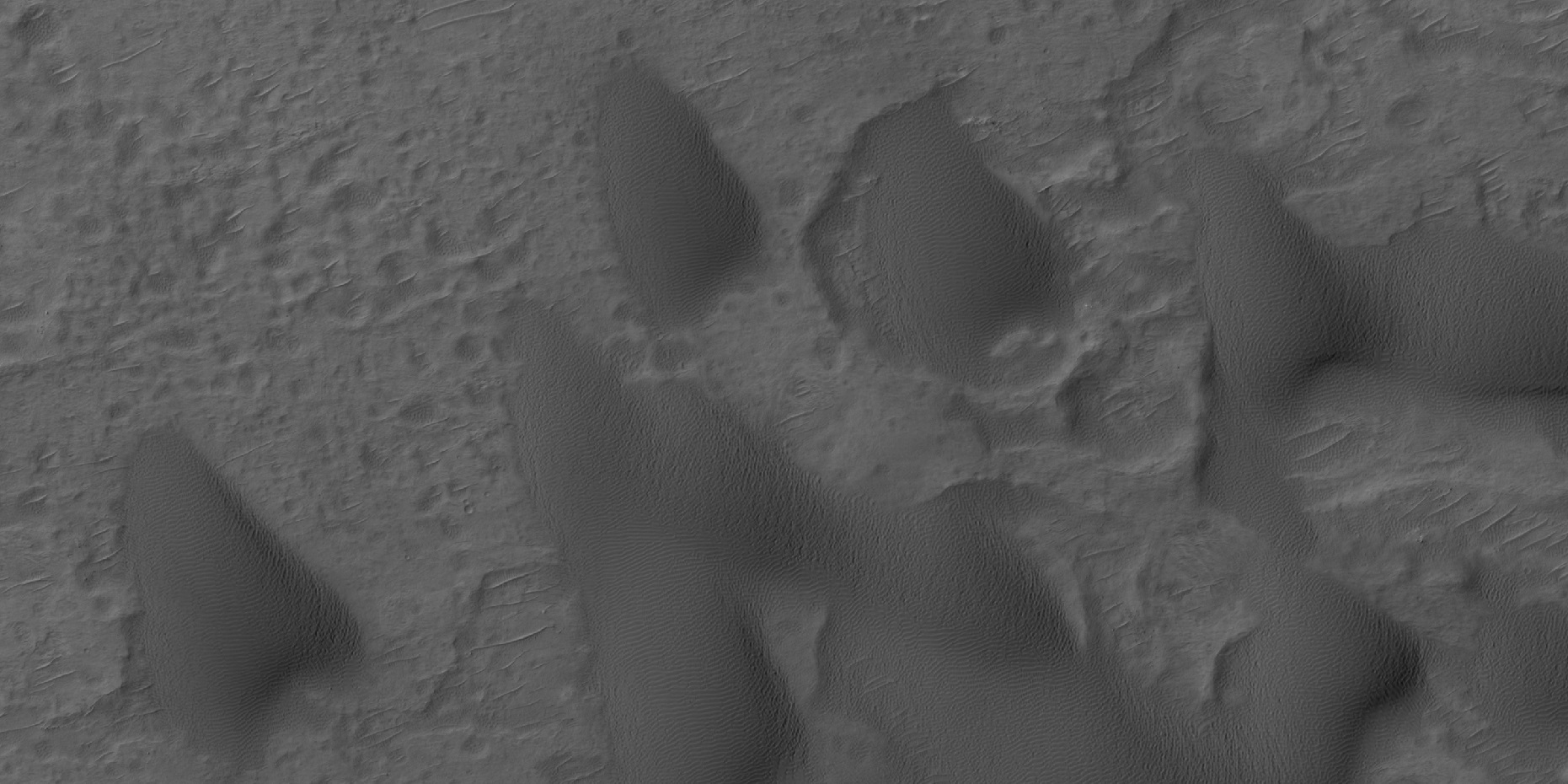
Close view of dunes, as seen by HiRISE under HiWish program

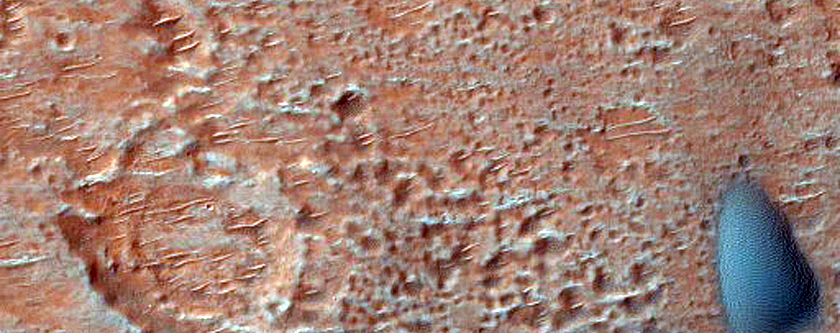
Close, color view of dunes as seen by HiRISE under HiWish program Ripples are visible on dune surface.

== Bibliography and recommended reading ==
- Boyce, Joseph, M. (2008). The Smithsonian Book of Mars; Konecky & Konecky: Old Saybrook, CT, ISBN 978-1-58834-074-0
- Carr, Michael, H. (2006). The Surface of Mars; Cambridge University Press: Cambridge, UK, ISBN 978-0-521-87201-0.
- Hartmann, William, K. (2003). A Traveler’s Guide to Mars: The Mysterious Landscapes of the Red Planet; Workman: New York, ISBN 0-7611-2606-6.
- Morton, Oliver (2003). Mapping Mars: Science, Imagination, and the Birth of a World; Picador: New York, ISBN 0-312-42261-X.
- Sheehan, William (1996). The Planet Mars: A History of Observation & Discovery; University of Arizona Press: Tucson, AZ, ISBN 0-8165-1640-5. http://www.uapress.arizona.edu/onlinebks/MARS/CONTENTS.HTM.
