= Herschel (crater) =

There are several impact craters named Herschel in the Solar System, although the best known is the huge crater on Saturn's moon Mimas. Most are named after the eighteenth-century astronomer William Herschel.

- Herschel (lunar crater), on the Moon
- Herschel (Martian crater), on Mars
- Herschel (Mimantean crater), on Mimas
- J. Herschel (crater) - a lunar crater named after John Herschel
- C. Herschel (crater) - a lunar crater named after Caroline Herschel
