= Auki (crater) =

Crater on Mars

Auki is an impact crater in the Mare Tyrrhenum quadrangle of Mars, at 15.76 °S latitude and 263.13 °W longitude. It is 40.0 km in diameter and was named after Auki, a town in the Solomon Islands, in 2015 by the International Astronomical Union (IAU) Working Group for Planetary System Nomenclature (WGPSN).

Auki Crater has a central peak. Impact craters generally have a rim with ejecta around them, in contrast volcanic craters usually do not have a rim or ejecta deposits. As craters get larger (greater than 10 km in diameter) they usually have a central peak. The peak is caused by a rebound of the crater floor following the impact.

Strong evidence for hydrothermalism was reported by a team of researchers studying Auki. This crater contains ridges that may have been produced after fractures formed with an impact. Using instruments on the Mars Reconnaissance Orbiter they found the minerals smectite, silica, zeolite, serpentine, carbonate, and chlorite that are common in impact-induced hydrothermal systems on Earth. Other evidence of post-impact hydrothermal systems on Mars from other scientists who studied other Martian craters.

Impacts fracture rocks and create a great deal of heat that may last for many thousands of years. This heat can result in new minerals from hydrothermal circulation. On Earth impact craters have resulted in useful minerals. Some of the ores produced from impact related effects on Earth include ores of iron, uranium, gold, copper, and nickel. It is estimated that the value of materials mined from impact structures is 5 billion dollars/year just for North America. While nothing may be found on Mars that would justify the high cost of transport to Earth, the more necessary ores future colonists can obtain from Mars, the easier it would be to build colonies on the Red Planet.

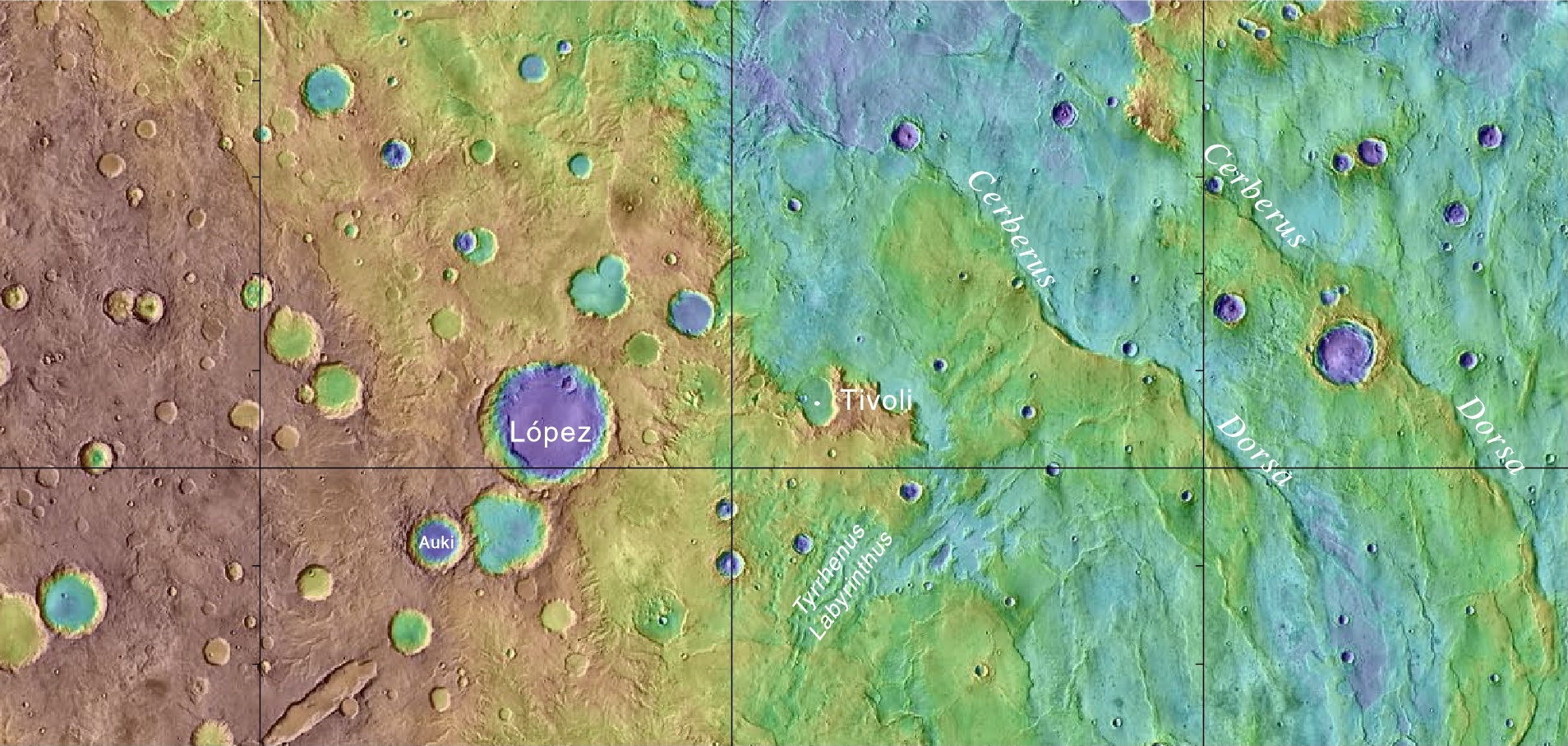
Topographical map showing location of Auki and other nearby features. Color shows elevation.

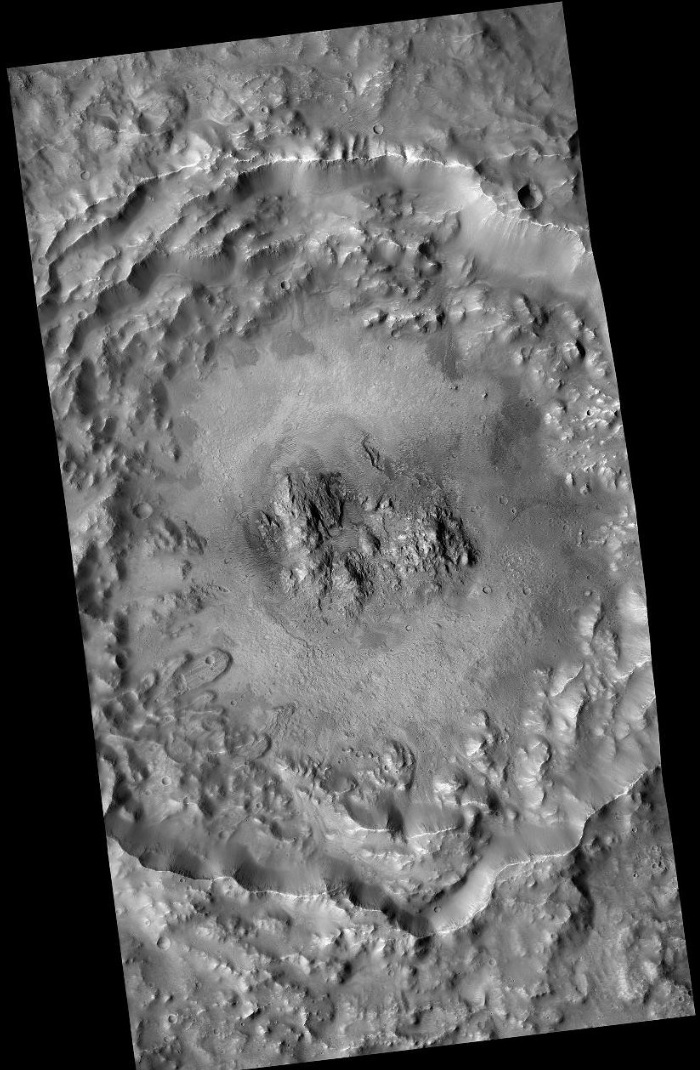
Wide view of Auki, as seen by CTX

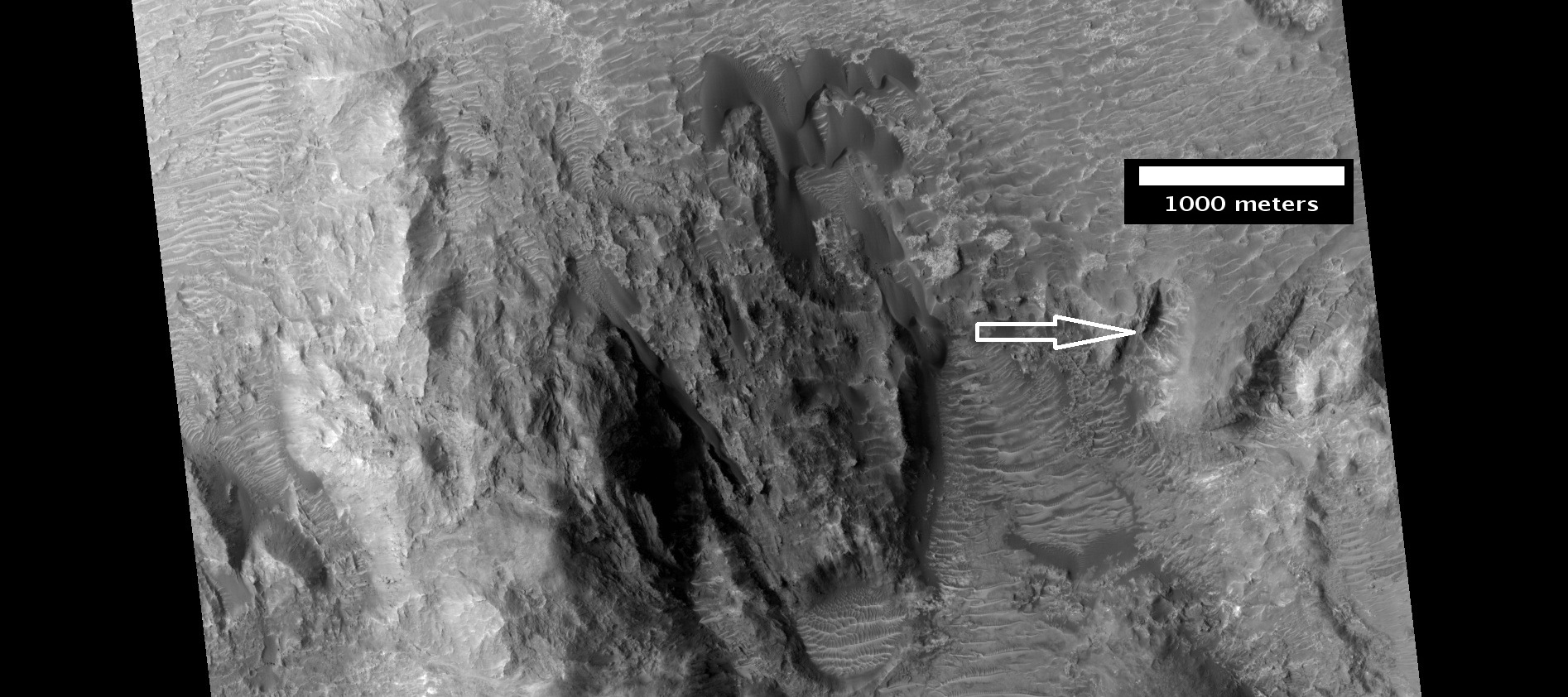
Close view of central portion of Auki, as seen by HiRISE Arrow indicates ridges. Sand dunes are present near the top of the image.

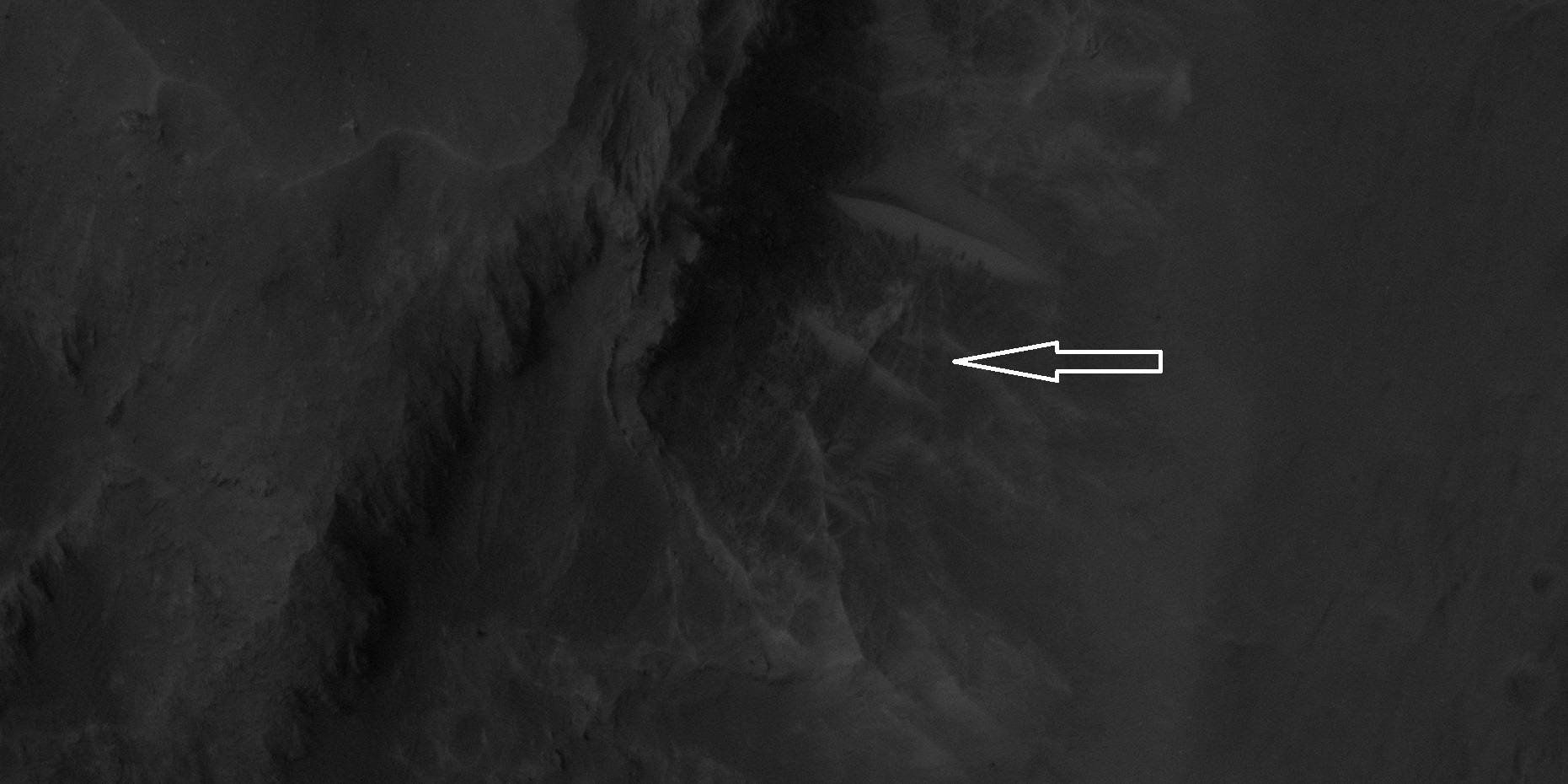
Close view of ridges from previous HiRISE image Arrow indicates an X-shaped ridge.

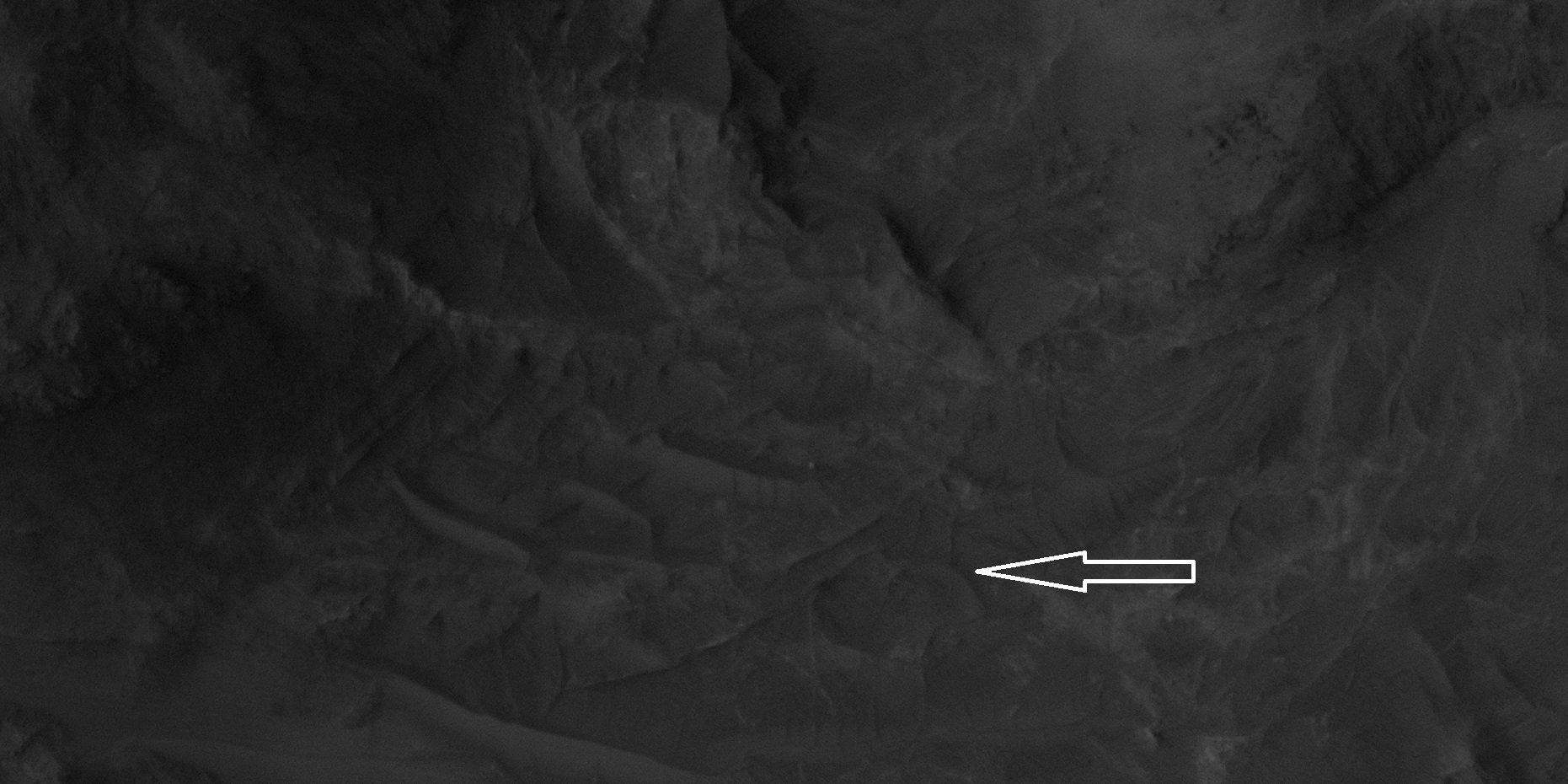
Close view of central section of Auki showing ridges with arrow Image is an enlargement of a previous HiRISE image.

== See also ==
- List of craters on Mars

== Recommended reading ==
- Lorenz, R. 2014. The Dune Whisperers. The Planetary Report: 34, 1, 8-14
