= Resen (crater) =

Resen is a crater in the Mare Tyrrhenum quadrangle on Mars, located at 28.22° South and 251.13° West. It is measures 7.4 kilometers in diameter and was named after the town of Resen in North Macedonia. The naming was approved by IAU's Working Group for Planetary System Nomenclature on 19 January 2011.

Some parts of the crater display a high concentration of closely spaced pits. Pits show little or no evidence of rims or ejecta. The pits are so close to each other that adjacent pits often share the same wall. It is believed that the pits form from steam produced when the heat from the impact process interacts with ice in the ground.

The presence of these pits is evidence that the region has ground ice. On Mars, heat from the impact melts ice in the ground. Water from the melting ice dissolves minerals, and then deposits them in cracks or faults that were produced with the impact. This process, called hydrothermal alteration, is a major way in which ore deposits are produced. The area around Martian craters may be rich in useful ores for the future colonization of Mars. Studies on the earth have documented that cracks are produced and that secondary minerals veins are deposited in the cracks. Images from satellites orbiting Mars have detected cracks near impact craters. Great amounts of heat are produced during impacts. The area around a large impact may take hundreds of thousands of years to cool.

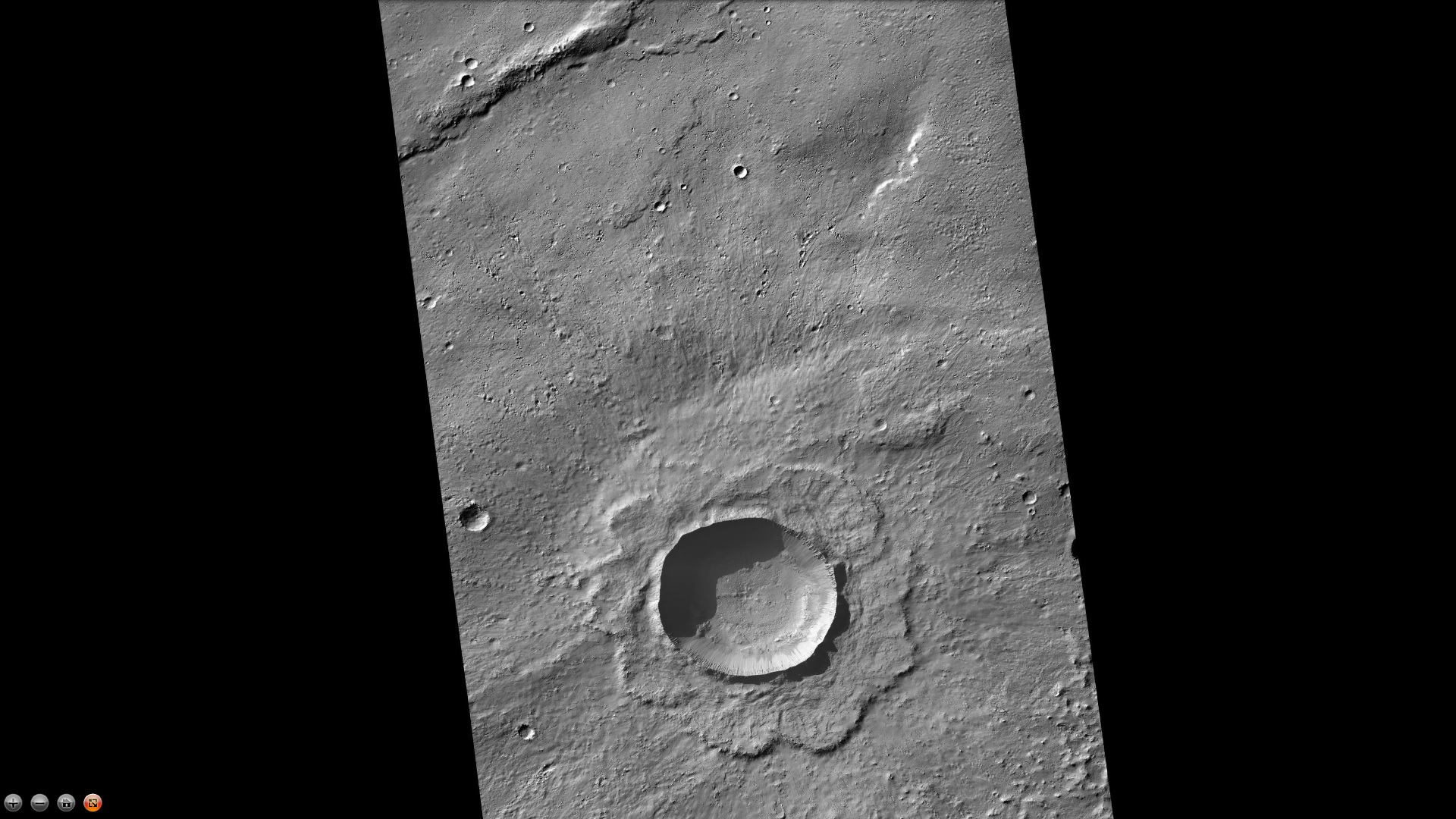
Resen Crater, as seen by CTX camera (on Mars Reconnaissance Orbiter).

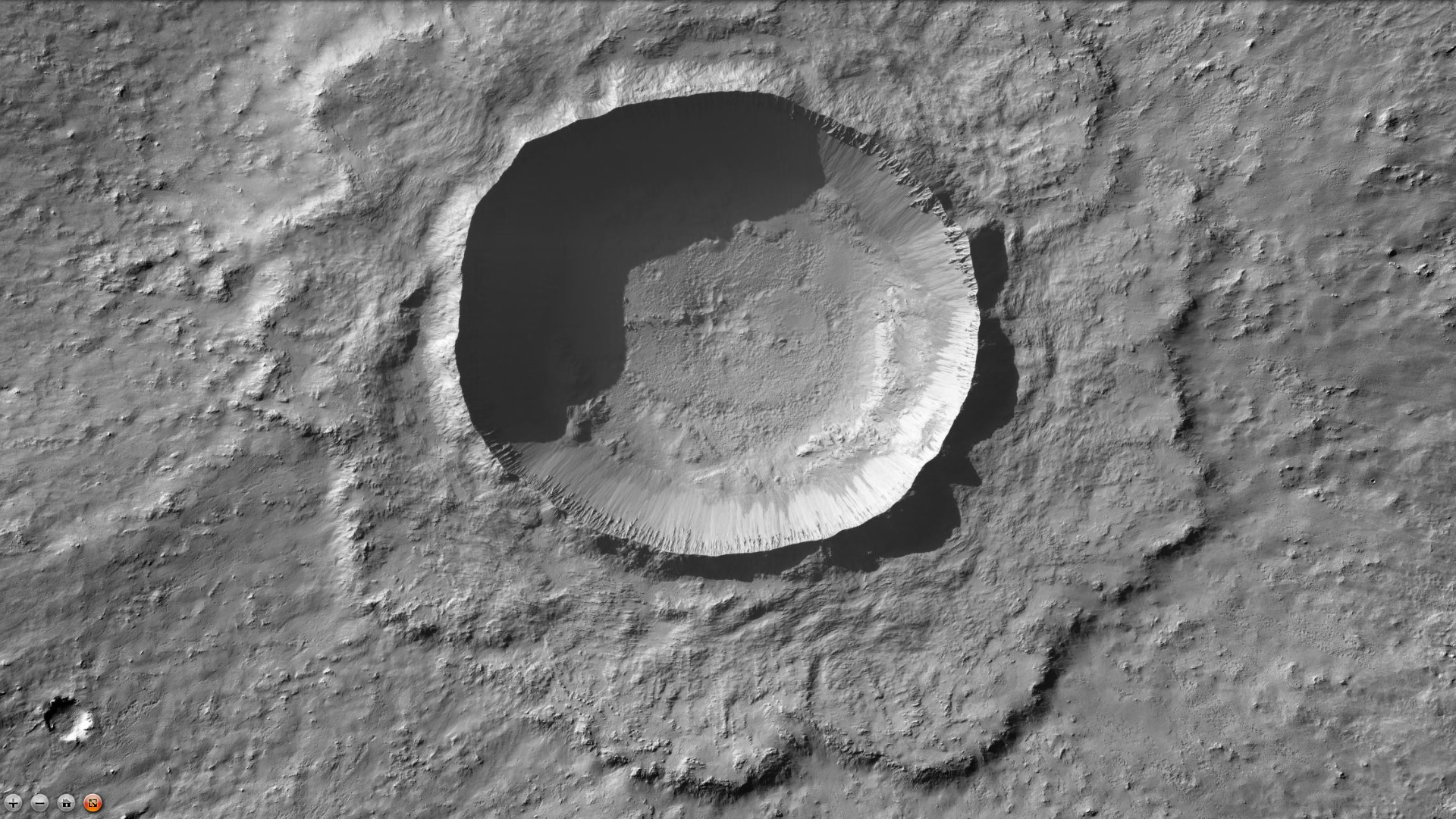
Resen Crater as seen by CTX camera (on Mars Reconnaissance Orbiter). Besides showing the ejecta, image shows small pits on crater floor caused by escaping steam. Note: this image is an enlargement of the previous image of Resen.

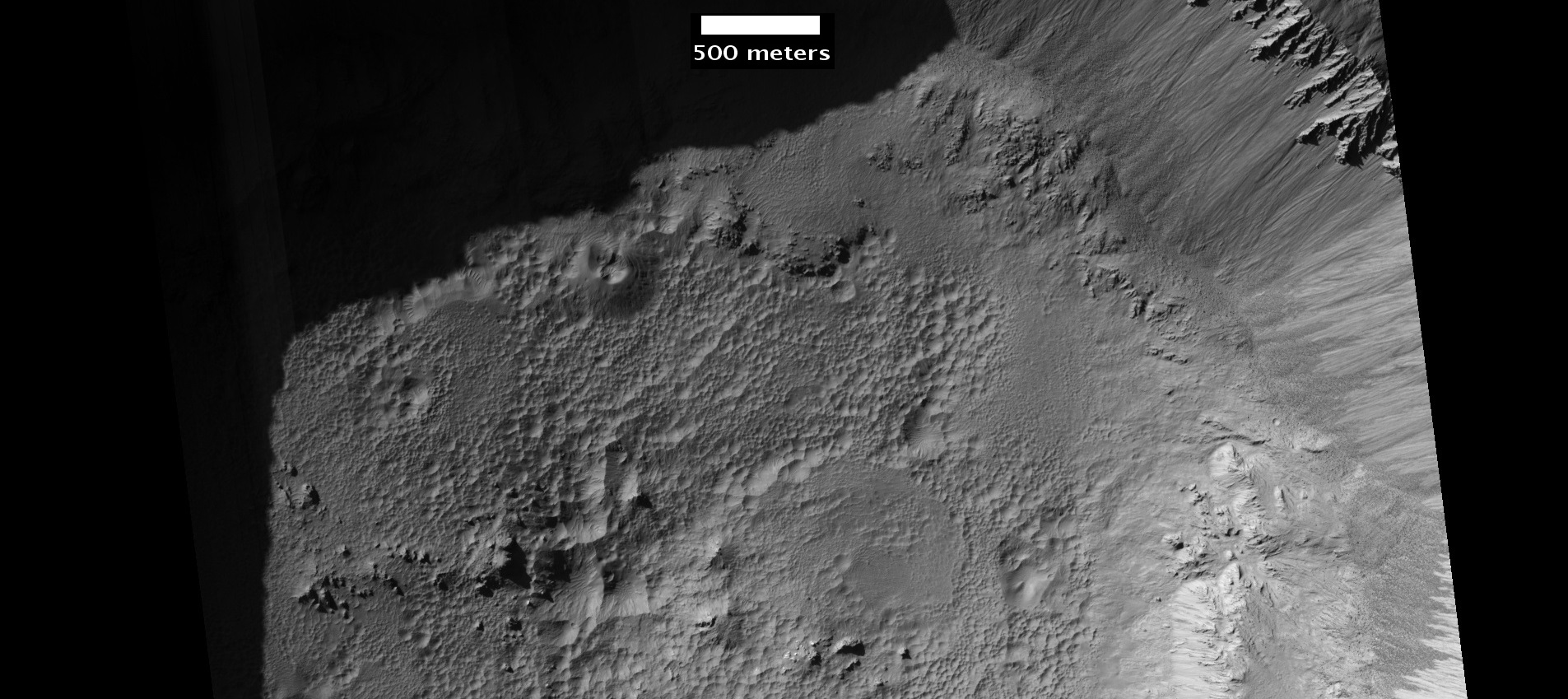
Pits on floor of Resen Crater, as seen by HiRISE. Pits were formed when heat from impact vaporized ice in the ground.

== See also ==
- Climate of Mars
- Geology of Mars
- HiRISE
- Impact crater
- Impact event
- List of craters on Mars
- Ore resources on Mars
- Planetary nomenclature
- Water on Mars
