= Mare Tyrrhenum quadrangle =

Part of the surface of Mars

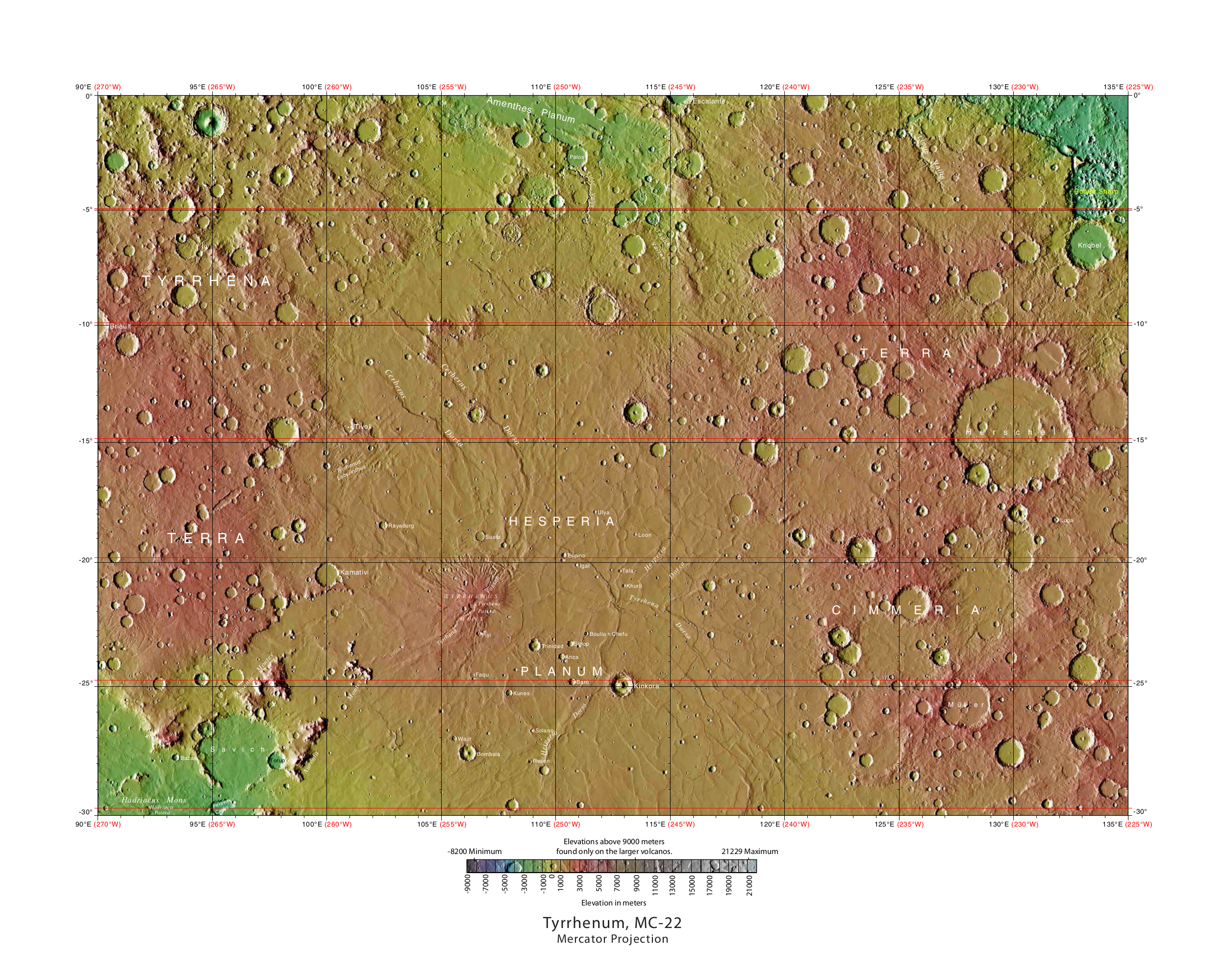
- Map of Mare Tyrrhenum quadrangle from Mars Orbiter Laser Altimeter (MOLA) data. The highest elevations are red and the lowest are blue.
- Coordinates: 15°S 247.5°W

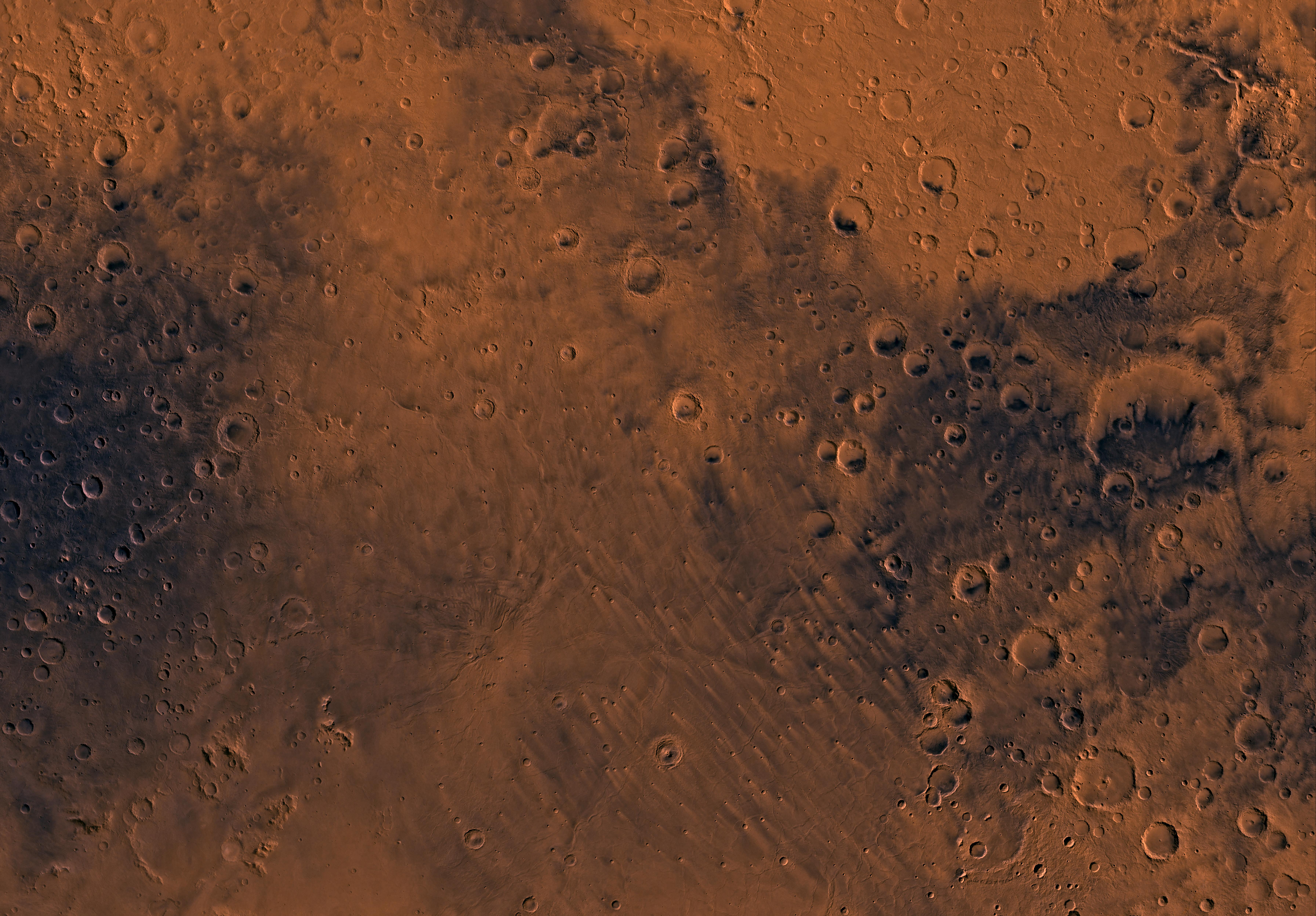
Image of Mare Tyrrhenum quadrangle (MC-22). Most of the region contains heavily cratered highlands. The central part contains Tyrrhena Patera and the associated ridged plains of Hesperia Planum.

The Mare Tyrrhenum quadrangle is one of a series of 30 quadrangle maps of Mars used by the United States Geological Survey (USGS) Astrogeology Research Program. This quadrangle is also referred to as MC-22 (Mars Chart-22). It contains parts of the regions Tyrrhena Terra, Hesperia Planum, and Terra Cimmeria.

The Mare Tyrrhenum quadrangle covers the area from 225° to 270° west longitude and 0° to 30° south latitude on Mars. Schiaparelli named the area after Earth's Tyrrhenian Sea, which lies between Italy and Sicily. The region was subsequently renamed to Mare Tyrrhena after spacecraft photos revealed that it is an old, cratered plain rather than a sea. It contains the large volcano Tyrrhenus Mons, one of the oldest, and perhaps the most complex volcanoes on Mars. Mare Tyrrhenum's largest crater is Herschel. Licus Vallis and the Ausonia Montes are other major features in the region.

== Fossa on Mars ==
Large troughs (long narrow depressions) are called fossae in the geographical language used for Mars. Troughs form when the crust is stretched until it breaks. The stretching can be due to the large weight of a nearby volcano. Fossae/pit craters are common near volcanoes in the Tharsis and Elysium system of volcanoes. A trough often has two breaks with a middle section moving down, leaving steep cliffs along the sides; such a trough is called a graben. Lake George, in northern New York State, is a lake that sits in a graben. Studies have found that on Mars a fault may be as deep as 5 km, that is the break in the rock goes down to 5 km. Moreover, the crack or fault sometimes widens or dilates. This widening causes a void to form with a relatively high volume. When material slides into the void, a pit crater or a pit crater chain forms. Pit craters do not have rims or ejecta around them, like impact craters do. On Mars, individual pit craters can join to form chains or even to form troughs that are sometimes scalloped. Other ideas have been suggested for the formation of fossae and pit craters. There is evidence that they are associated with dikes of magma. Magma might move along, under the surface, breaking the rock and more importantly melting ice. The resulting action would cause a crack to form at the surface. Pit craters are not common on Earth. Sinkholes, where the ground falls into a hole (sometimes in the middle of a town) resemble pit craters on Mars. However, on the Earth these holes are caused by limestone being dissolved thereby causing a void. Tyrrhenus Mons has some beautiful fossae and pit craters associated with it. These features are easily visible in the gallery image below, obtained by HiRISE.

Knowledge of the locations and formation mechanisms of pit craters and fossae is important for the future colonization of Mars because they may be reservoirs of water.

== Craters ==
- Auki
- Briault
- Herschel
- Kinkora
- Müller
- Robert Sharp
- Resen

== Hydrothermal features in Auki ==
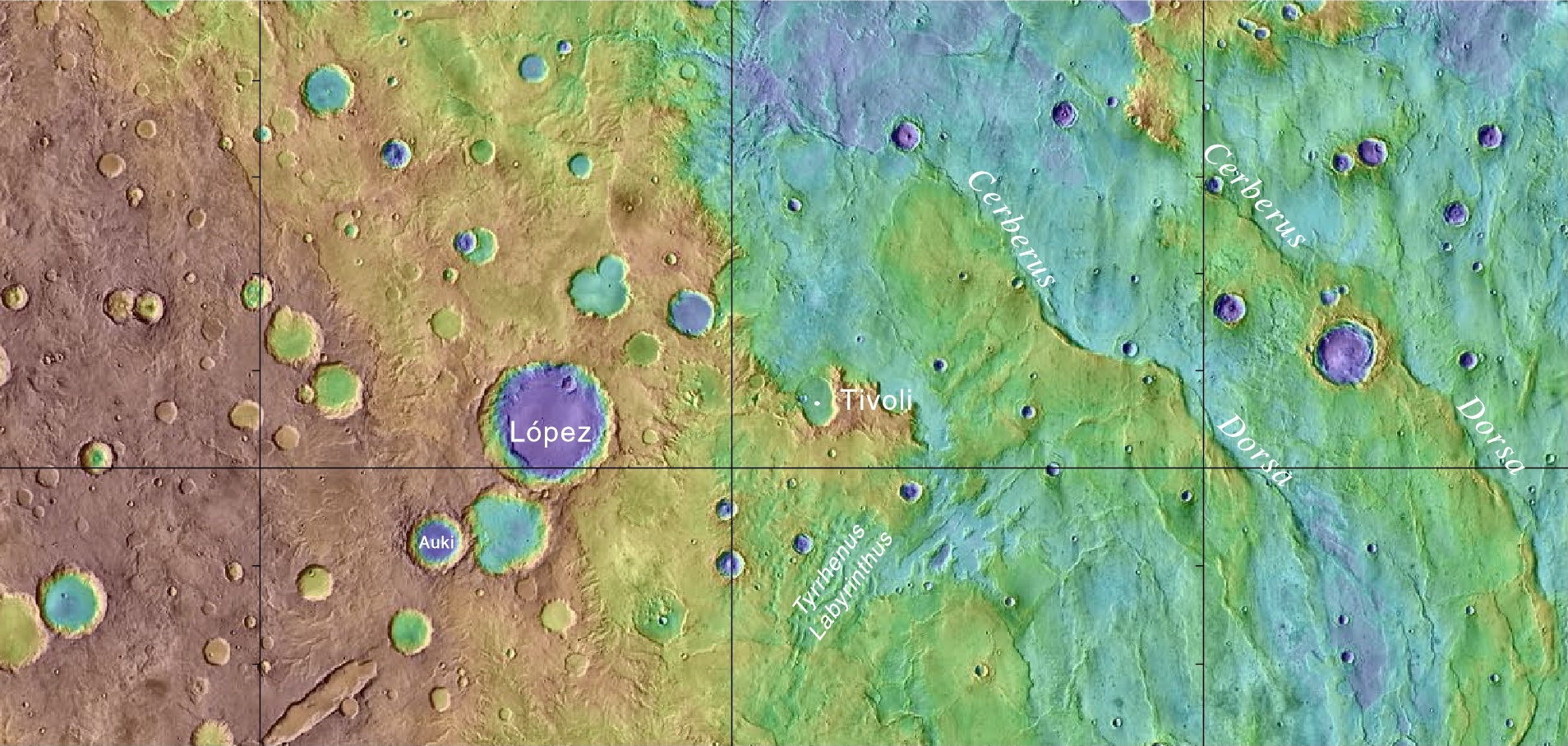
Topographical map showing location of Auki crater and other nearby features. Color shows elevation.

The crater Auki shows ridge networks that are believed to be evidence of hydrothermal processes that occurred after impact. Impacts fracture rock and create enormous amounts of heat. On Mars, this heat can cause ice to melt and then the resulting water to move through cracks that are generated during impact. This water will eventually deposit minerals. The mineral deposits may become evident when surrounding ground erodes. Deposits formed in this manner are more resistant to erosion.

Researchers have speculated that these hydrothermal effects should be common on Mars. Ridges found in and around the center of Auki are evidence. This crater contains ridges that may have been produced after fractures formed with an impact. Using instruments on the Mars Reconnaissance Orbiter they found the minerals smectite, silica, zeolite, serpentine, carbonate, and chlorite that are common in impact-induced hydrothermal systems on Earth. Other evidence of post-impact hydrothermal systems on Mars from other scientists who studied other Martian craters.

== Channels ==
There is enormous evidence that water once flowed in river valleys and channels on Mars. Images of curved channels have been seen in images from Mars spacecraft dating back to the early 1970s with the Mariner 9 orbiter. Vallis (plural valles) is the Latin word for valley. It is used in planetary geology for the naming of landform features on other planets, including what could be old river valleys that were discovered on Mars, when probes were first sent to Mars. The Viking Orbiters caused a revolution in our ideas about water on Mars; huge river valleys were found in many areas. Space craft cameras showed that floods of water broke through dams, carved deep valleys, eroded grooves into bedrock, and traveled thousands of kilometers. Some valles on Mars (Mangala Vallis, Athabasca Vallis, Granicus Vallis, and Tinjar Valles) clearly begin at graben. On the other hand, some of the large outflow channels begin in rubble-filled low areas called chaos or chaotic terrain. It has been suggested that massive amounts of water were trapped under pressure beneath a thick cryosphere (layer of frozen ground), then the water was suddenly released, perhaps when the cryosphere was broken by a fault.

== Linear ridge networks ==
Linear ridge networks are found in various places on Mars in and around craters. Ridges often appear as mostly straight segments that intersect in a lattice-like manner. They are hundreds of meters long, tens of meters high, and several meters wide. It is thought that impacts created fractures in the surface, these fractures later acted as channels for fluids. Fluids cemented the structures. With the passage of time, surrounding material was eroded away, thereby leaving hard ridges behind. Since the ridges occur in locations with clay, these formations could serve as a marker for clay which requires water for its formation. Water here could have supported past life in these locations. Clay may also preserve fossils or other traces of past life.

== Dunes ==
Sand dunes have been found in many places on Mars. The presence of dunes shows that the planet has an atmosphere with wind, for dunes require wind to pile up the sand. Most dunes on Mars are black because of the weathering of the volcanic rock basalt. Black sand can be found on Earth on Hawaii and on some tropical South Pacific islands. Sand is common on Mars due to the old age of the surface that has allowed rocks to erode into sand. Dunes on Mars have been observed to move many meters. Some dunes move along. In this process, sand moves up the windward side and then falls down the leeward side of the dune, thus caused the dune to go toward the leeward side (or slip face). When images are enlarged, some dunes on Mars display ripples on their surfaces. These are caused by sand grains rolling and bouncing up the windward surface of a dune. The bouncing grains tend to land on the windward side of each ripple. The grains do not bounce very high so it does not take much to stop them.

== See also ==
- Barchan
- Columnar jointing
- Dunes
- Fossa (geology)
- Geology of Mars
- HiWish program
- HiRISE
- Impact crater
- Linear ridge networks
- List of quadrangles on Mars
- Vallis

MC-01 Mare Boreum (features)
MC-02 Diacria (features)		MC-03 Arcadia (features)	MC-04 Acidalium (features)	MC-05 Ismenius Lacus (features)		MC-06 Casius (features)	MC-07 Cebrenia (features)
MC-08 Amazonis (features)	MC-09 Tharsis (features)	MC-10 Lunae Palus (features)	MC-11 Oxia Palus (features)	MC-12 Arabia (features)	MC-13 Syrtis Major (features)	MC-14 Amenthes (features)	MC-15 Elysium (features)
MC-16 Memnonia (features)	MC-17 Phoenicis Lacus (features)	MC-18 Coprates (features)	MC-19 Margaritifer Sinus (features)	MC-20 Sinus Sabaeus (features)	MC-21 Iapygia (features)	MC-22 Mare Tyrrhenum (features)	MC-23 Aeolis (features)
MC-24 Phaethontis (features)		MC-25 Thaumasia (features)	MC-26 Argyre (features)	MC-27 Noachis (features)		MC-28 Hellas (features)	MC-29 Eridania (features)
MC-30 Mare Australe (features)
