= Ausonia Montes =

Martian geographical feature

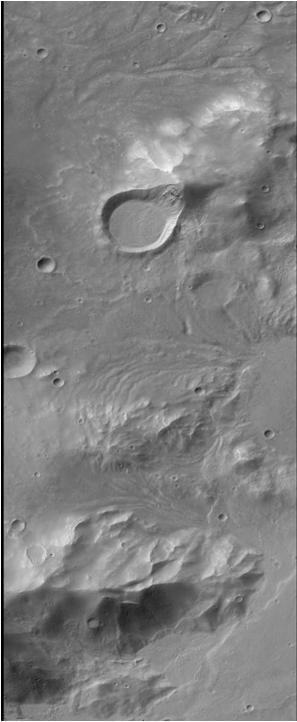
- Ausonia Montes in Mare Tyrrhenum as seen by CTX

Highest point
- Elevation: 1,370 m (4,490 ft)
- Coordinates: 25°42′S 99°04′E

Geography
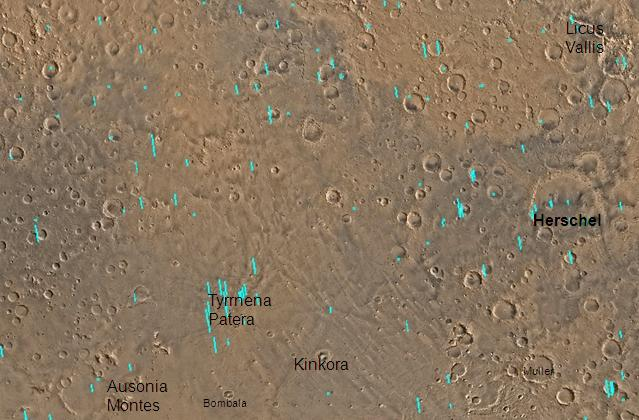
- Map of Mare Tyrrhenum quadrangle. Tyrrnena Patera is a major volcano. Ausonia Montes is on the bottom left.

Ausonia Montes /ɔːˈsoʊniə ˈmɒntiːz/ is a mountain (officially mountains) in the Mare Tyrrhenum quadrangle of Mars, at 25.42° south latitude and 99.04° east longitude. It is 158 kilometres (98 mi) across and was named after an albedo feature name.
