= Licus Vallis =

Vallis on Mars

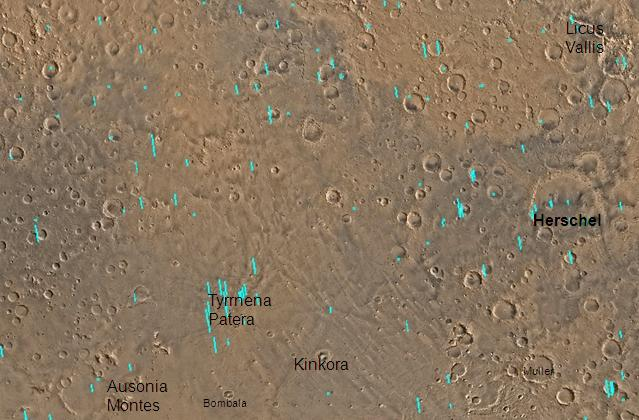
- Map of Mare Tyrrhenum quadrangle. Tyrrhnena Patera is a major volcano.
- Coordinates: 2.9°S 233.9°W

Licus Vallis is an ancient river valley in the Mare Tyrrhenum quadrangle of Mars, located at 2.9°S 233.9°W. It is 219.1 km (136.1 mi) long and was named after an ancient name for modern river Lech in Germany and Austria.

Licus Vallis, as seen by HiRISE.

== See also ==
- Geology of Mars
- HiRISE
- Vallis (planetary geology)
- Water on Mars
