= Herschel (Martian crater) =

Crater on Mars

- Martian impact crater Herschel based on THEMIS image
- Planet: Mars
- Coordinates: 14.9°S 130°E
- Quadrangle: Mare Tyrrhenum
- Diameter: 304.5 km
- Eponym: William Herschel & John Herschel

Herschel is an impact crater in Mars's southern hemisphere. At roughly 304 kilometers in diameter, it is a moderately large impact crater. Located at 14.5°S, 130°E, Herschel is in the Mare Tyrrhenum region of Mars. The crater is jointly named after the seventeenth/eighteenth century father and son astronomers William Herschel and John Herschel.

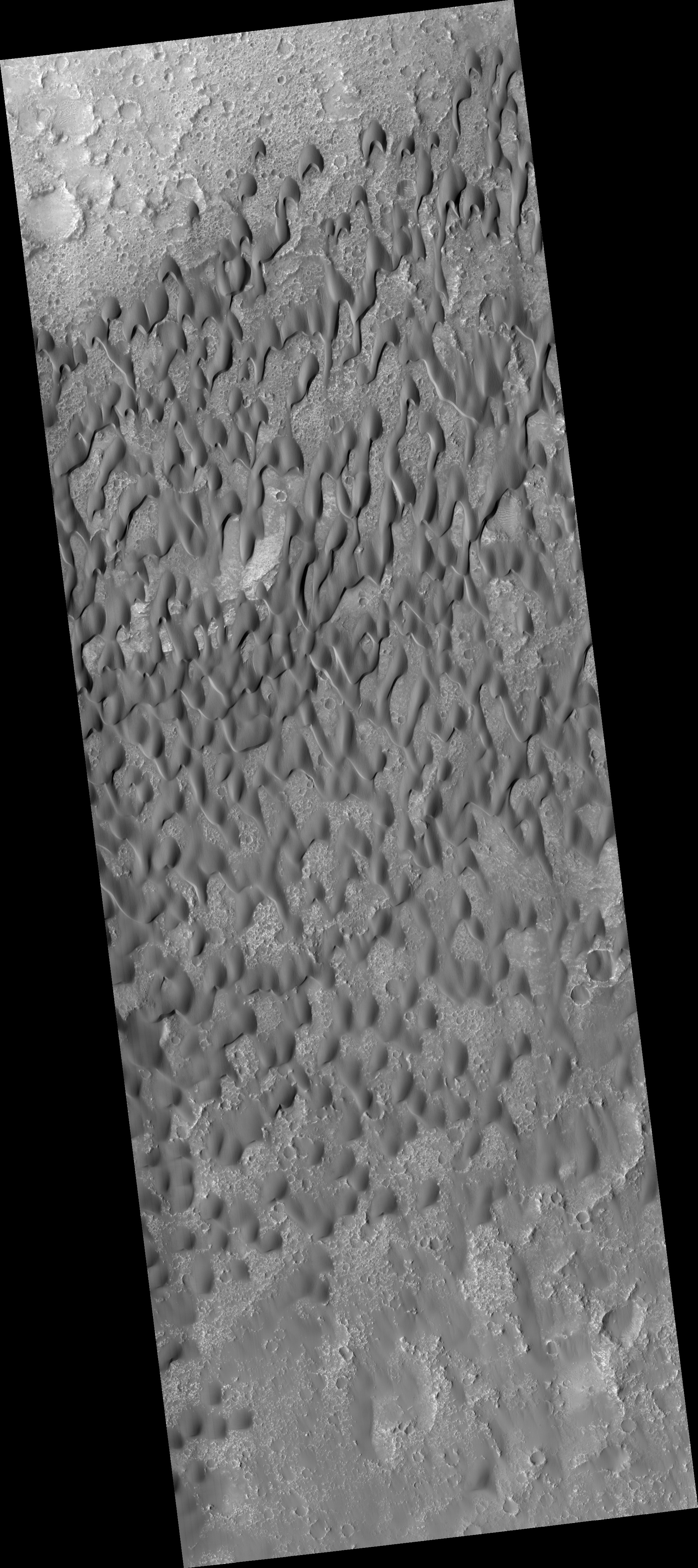
Dark dunes in Hershel crater.

== Moving Sand Dunes ==
Mars Global Surveyor spacecraft originally photographed fields of dark sand dunes within Herschel. Images from the NASA Mars Reconnaissance Orbiter showed that sand dunes on the floor of the Herschel crater are not stationary (as previously believed), but moved over time. Images from photos taken by the Orbiter's High Resolution Imaging Science Experiment (HiRISE) on March 3, 2007 and December 1, 2010 show clear shifting of dunes and ripples. Research published in Icarus stated that the dunes in Hershel Crater moved 0.8 m in a time span of 3.7 Earth-years. Also, it was determined that dune ripple moved 1.1 m in that time period.

== See also ==
- List of craters on Mars
