= Tyrrhenus Mons =

Martian volcano

- 2001 Mars Odyssey THEMIS daytime infrared image mosaic
- Coordinates: 21.36°S 253.47°W

Tyrrhenus Mons, formerly Tyrrhena Mons or Tyrrhena Patera, is a large volcano in the Mare Tyrrhenum quadrangle of Mars, located at 21.36° south latitude and 253.47° west longitude. The name "Tyrrhena Patera" now refers only to the central depression, a volcanic crater or caldera. It was named after a classical albedo feature name. Pit chains are found at the summit of Tyrrhenus Mons. They are formed by collapse of material into underground voids. Since they form chains and concentric fractures that are aligned, they are probably caused by extension of the surface. Volcanic processes made the crust pull apart. Voids were formed, then material fell into them, leaving holes. It is one of the oldest volcanoes on Mars. As a consequence of its old age, Tyrrhenus Mons has many radiating gullies on its slope. When it was formed, magma may have gone through frozen ground and then erupted as easily eroded ash, instead of lava flows.

== Images ==
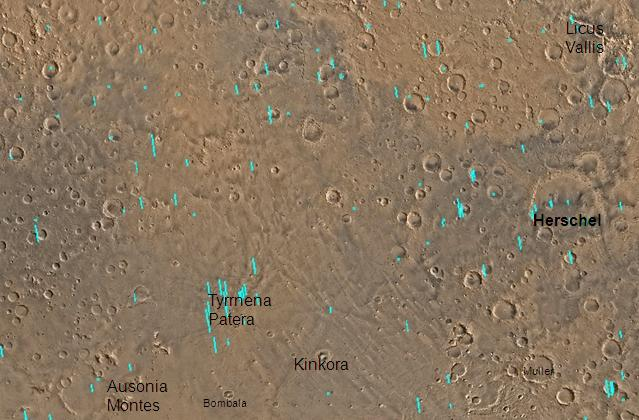
Map of Mare Tyrrhenum quadrangle.

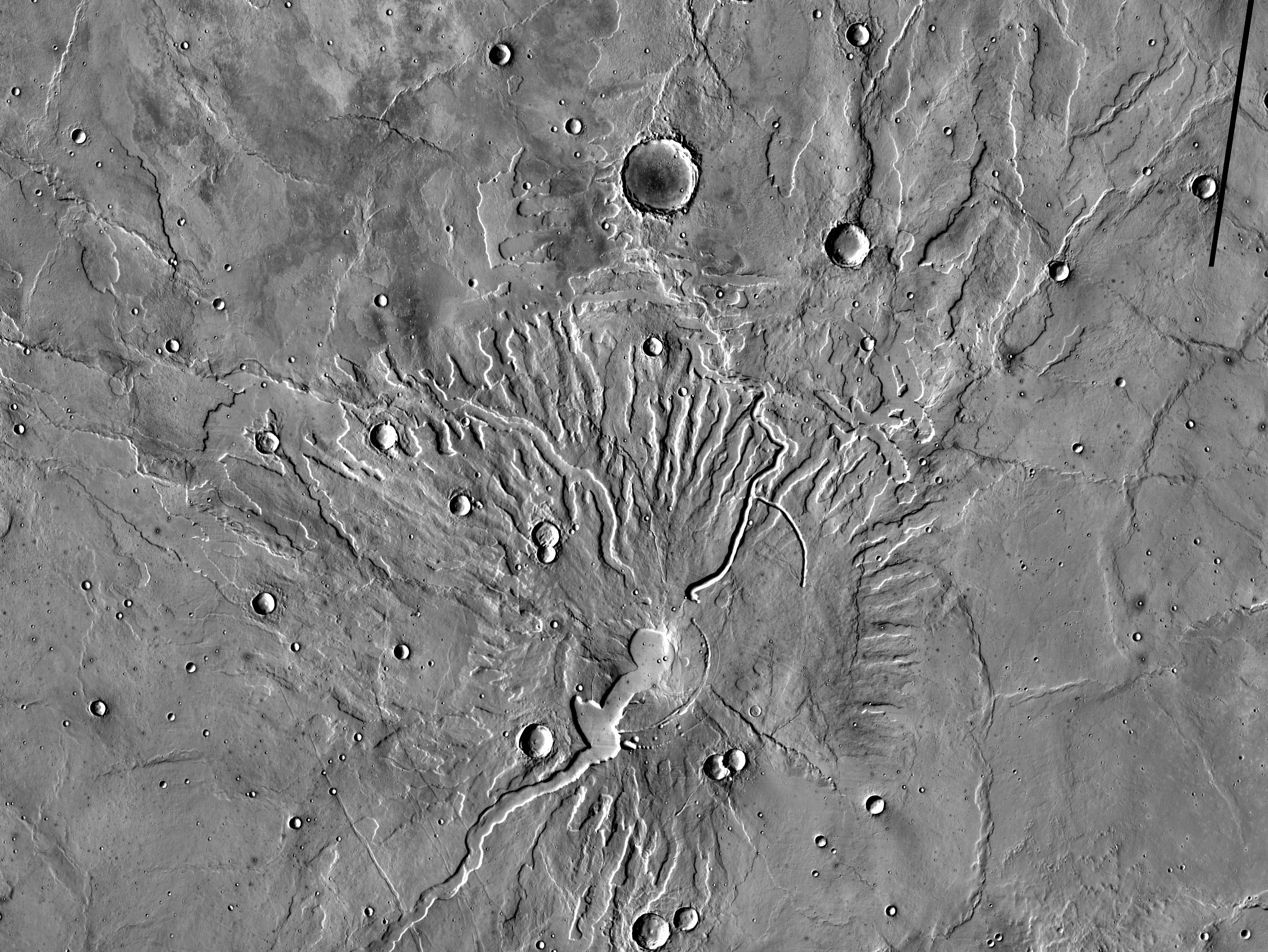
Tyrrhenus Mons - a major volcano.

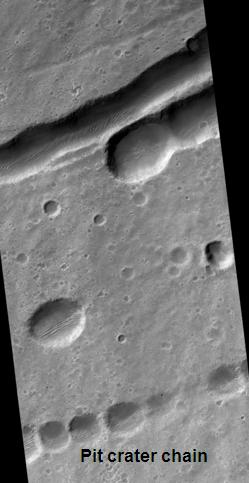
Pit crater chains around Tyrrhenus Mons.
