= Herschel =

Herschel or Herschell may refer to:

== People ==
- Herschel (name), various people

== Places ==
- Herschel, Eastern Cape, South Africa
- Herschel, Saskatchewan
- Herschel, Yukon
- Herschel Bay, Canada
- Herschel Heights, Alexander Island, Antarctica
- Herschel Island, Canada
- Herschel Island (Chile), an island of the Hermite Islands archipelago
- Mount Herschel, Antarctica
- Cape Sterneck, Antarctica

== Astronomy ==
- Herschel (crater), various craters in the Solar System
- 2000 Herschel, an asteroid
- 35P/Herschel–Rigollet, a comet
- Herschel Catalogue (disambiguation), various astronomical catalogues of nebulae
- Herschel Medal, awarded by the UK Royal Astronomical Society
- Herschel Museum of Astronomy, in Bath, United Kingdom
- Herschel Space Observatory, operated by the European Space Agency
- Herschel wedge, an optical prism used in solar observation
- Herschel's Garnet Star, a red supergiant star
- William Herschel Telescope, in the Canary Islands
- Telescopium Herschelii, a constellation
- Uranus, for a time known as Herschel

== Other uses ==
- Allan Herschell Company, which specialized in amusement park rides
- Herschel–Bulkley fluid, a generalized model of a non-Newtonian fluid
- Herschel baronets, of the United Kingdom
- Herschel Girls' School, a private day and boarding school in Cape Town
- Herschel Grammar School, in Slough, Berkshire, England
- Herschel graph, a bipartite undirected graph
- Herschel Greer Stadium, in Nashville, Tennessee
- Herschel the sea lion, predatory seals in Seattle
- Herschel Walker trade, the largest player trade in the history of the National Football League
- Herschel Supply Co., Canadian backpack manufacturer
- USNS Hershel "Woody" Williams (T-ESB-4), sister ship of USNS Lewis B. Puller (T-ESB-3), a mobile landing platform
- Herschel, a specific heptomino and methuselah (cellular automaton) in Conway’s Game of Life
- Herschel, a a 1926 boat of the Mackenzie River watershed

== See also ==
- Hersch
- Hirsch (disambiguation)
- Hirsh
