= Hirsch (disambiguation) =

Hirsch is a German surname and a Yiddish masculine given name.

Hirsch may also refer to:

- Hirsch, Saskatchewan, Canada
- Hirsch Observatory, in Troy, New York, U.S.
- Hirsch conjecture, in mathematical programming and polyhedral combinatorics
- h-index, or Hirsch index, an author-level metric

== See also ==
- Hirsh (disambiguation)
- Hersh, a given name and surname
- Hersch, a surname
- Baron de Hirsch Cemetery (disambiguation)
