= Herschel (name) =

Herschel, Herschell, Herschelle or Hershel is a given name and a surname of German origin. Notable people with the name include:

== Given name ==
- Herschel H. Hatch (1837–1920), U.S. politician from Michigan
- Herschel Vespasian Johnson (1812–1880), U.S. politician from Georgia
- Benjamin Herschel Babbage (1815–1878), South Australian explorer
- Herschel V. Jones (1861–1928), American newspaper publisher
- Herschel Mayall (1863–1941), American actor
- Clifford Herschel Moore (1866–1931), American Latin scholar
- Herschel Clifford Parker (1867–1931), American physicist
- Herschel Bullen (1870–1966), American businessman
- Herschel W. Arant (1887–1941), American legal academic
- Herschel Johnson (1894–1966), U.S. diplomat from North Carolina
- Herschel Bennett (1896–1964), American baseball player
- Herschel Brown, American politician
- C. Herschel Schooley (1900–1985), American newspaper editor
- Herschel Smith (1900–1964), American wrestler
- Herschel Caldwell (1903–1989), American college football player
- Herschel Curry Smith (1903–1983), American track coach and athlete
- Herschel Lynn Greer (1906–1976), American businessman
- Herschel Evans (1909–1939), American saxophonist
- Hershel Ray Martin (1909–1980), American baseball player
- Herschel Daugherty (1910–1993), American film and television director
- Herschel C. Loveless (1911–1989), 34th governor of Iowa
- Herschel Austin (1911–1974), British furniture-maker and politician
- Herschel McCoy (1912–1956), American costume designer
- Herschel H. Cudd (1912–1992), American chemist
- Herschel Stockton (1913–1965), American football player
- Herschel F. Briles (1914–1994), U.S. Army soldier and Medal of Honor recipient
- Herschel L. Roman (1914–1989), American geneticist
- Herschel Schacter (1917–2013), American rabbi
- Herschel Burke Gilbert (1918–2003), American composer
- Herschel Lashkowitz (1918–1993), U.S. politician from North Dakota
- Herschel Rosenthal (1918–2009), U.S. politician from California
- Herschel Grynszpan (1921 – after 1942), assassin of German diplomat Ernst vom Rath
- Herschel Baltimore (1921–1968), American basketball player
- Herschel Friday (1922–1994), American lawyer
- Hershel Matt (1922–1987), American rabbi
- Herschel Bernardi (1923–1986), American actor
- Hershel W. Williams (1923–2022), U.S. marine and Medal of Honor recipient
- Herschel Leibowitz (1925–2011), American psychologist
- Hershel McGriff (born 1927), American stock car racer
- Herschell Gordon Lewis (1929–2016), a U.S. filmmaker, dubbed the Godfather of Gore
- Hershel Shanks (1930–2021), American archeologist
- Herschel Forester (1931–2018), American football player
- Herschel Hardin (born 1936), Canadian political activist
- Herschel Gober (born 1936), former U.S. Secretary of Veterans Affairs
- Herschell Turner (born 1938), American basketball player
- Hershel Schachter (born 1941), American rabbi
- Herschel W. Cleveland (born 1946), U.S. politician from Arkansas
- Herschel Weingrod (born 1947), American screenwriter
- Herschel Burgess, American college football player
- Herschel Garfein, American composer
- Herschel Gluck, British rabbi
- Hershel Nunez, American politician
- Herschel Walker (born 1962), American football player and politician
- Herschelle Gibbs (born 1974), South African cricketer
- Herschel "Guy" Beahm IV (born 1982), American Twitch streamer and internet celebrity known as Dr DisRespect
- Hershel Dennis (born 1984), American football player
- Herschel Sims (born 1991), American football player
- Hershel Greene, fictional character from The Walking Dead series
- Herschel Krustofski, fictional character from The Simpsons, better known as "Krusty The Clown"
- Hershel Layton, protagonist of the Professor Layton fictional universe
- Hershel of Ostropol, a prominent figure in Jewish humor
- Hershel Parker, American literary historian

== Surname ==
The name is closely tied to the Herschel family, an Anglo-German family of astronomers:

- William Herschel (1738–1822), astronomer and composer, discoverer of Uranus
- Caroline Herschel (1750–1848), astronomer and singer, sister of Sir William Herschel
- John Herschel (1792–1871), mathematician and astronomer, son of Sir William Herschel
- Alexander Stewart Herschel (1836–1907), astronomer, grandson of Sir William Herschel
- William James Herschel (1833–1917), Indian Civil Service officer, grandson of Sir William Herschel
- John Herschel the Younger (1837–1921), military engineer, surveyor and astronomer, grandson of Sir William Herschel

Other notable people with the surname include:

- Clemens Herschel (1842–1930), American hydraulic engineer
- May Herschel-Clarke (1850–1950), English poet
- Allan Herschell (1851–1927), creator of amusement park rides
- Farrer Herschell, 1st Baron Herschell (1837–1899), former Lord Chancellor of Great Britain
- Richard Herschell, 2nd Baron Herschell (1878–1929), British politician
- Ridley Haim Herschell (1807–1864), Anglo-Polish minister
- Rognvald Herschell, 3rd Baron Herschell (1923–2008), British politician
- Solomon Hirschell (1762–1842), British rabbi

== See also ==
- Hersch, Hersh, Herschel, Hirsch, Hirche, Tsvi-Hirsh, Zebi Hirsch
