= Hirsh =

Hirsh is a surname, a variant of Hirsch. Notable people with the surname include:

- Carolyn Hirsh, Australian politician
- David Hirsh, British academic
- David Julian Hirsh, Canadian actor
- Ed Hirsh, special effects artist
- Elijah Hirsh (born 1997), American-Israeli basketball player
- Jason Hirsh (born 1982), American baseball player
- Michael Hirsh (disambiguation)
- Nurit Hirsh (born 1942), Israeli composer, arranger, and conductor
- Tzvi Hirsh of Zidichov, Hasidic rabbi
- Wally Hirsh (1936–2024), German-born New Zealand educator

== See also ==
- Hirsch (disambiguation)
- Herz (disambiguation)
- Hersh
- Hersch
- Hirche
