= Greatness =

Concept of superiority

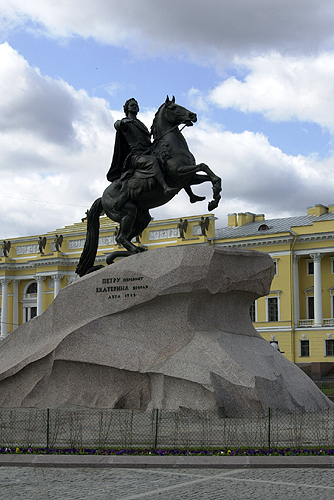
Monument of Peter the Great in Saint Petersburg

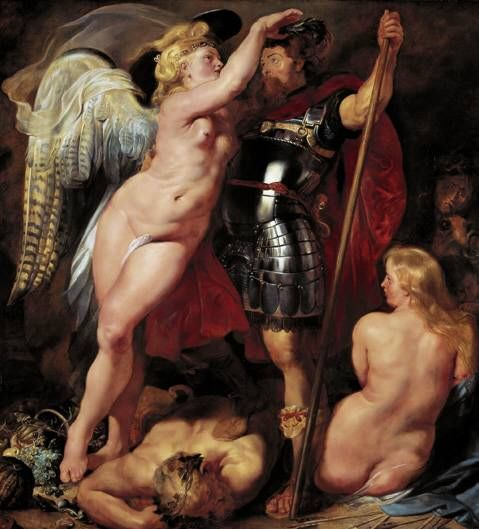
Coronation of the Hero of Virtue (c. 1612–1614) by Peter Paul Rubens

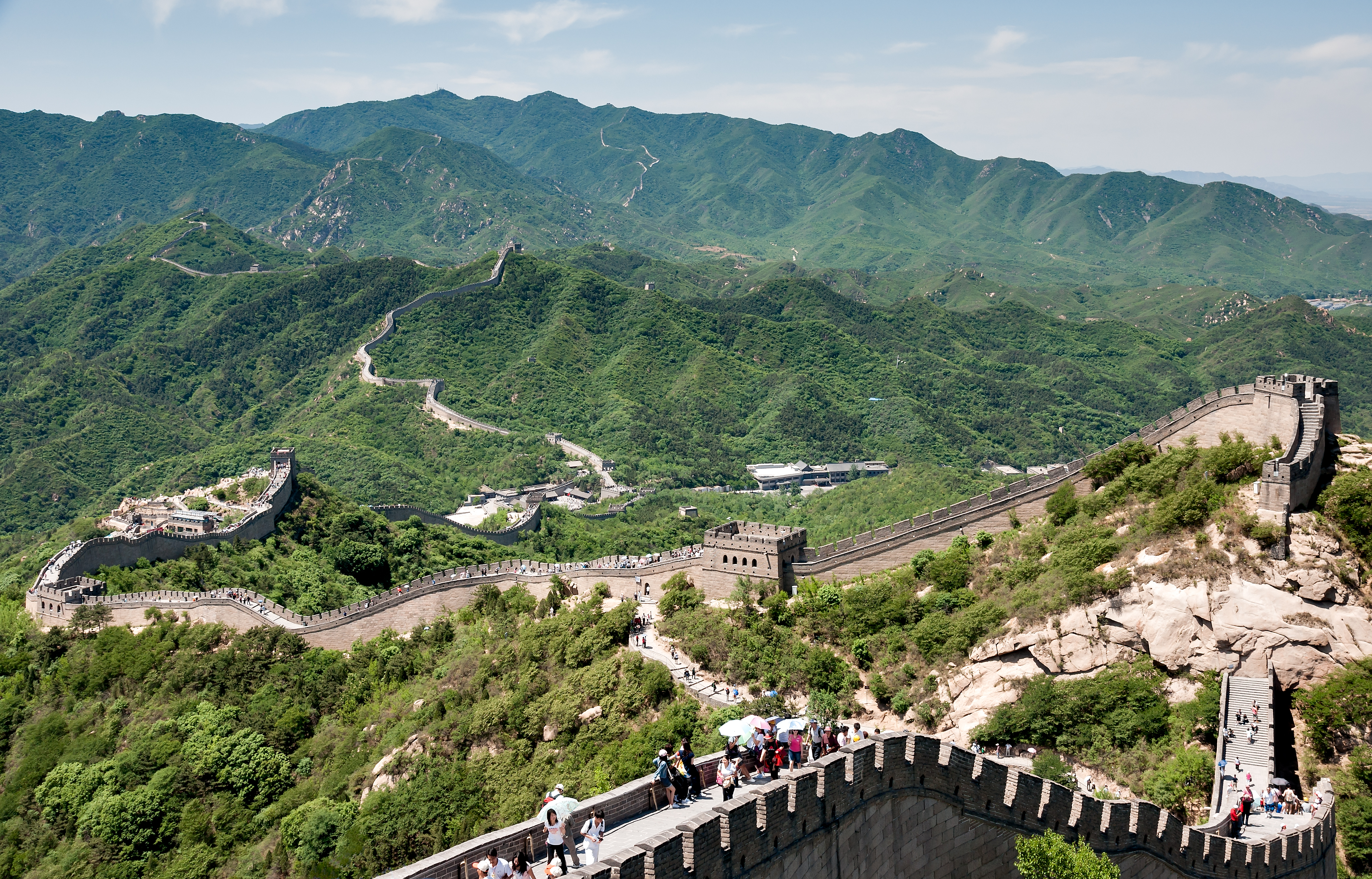
Great Wall of China

Greatness is a concept of a state of exceptional superiority affecting a person or object in a particular place or area. Greatness can also be attributed to individuals who possess a natural ability to be better than all others. An example of an expression of the concept in a qualified sense would be "Hector is the definition of greatness" or "Napoleon was one of the greatest wartime leaders". In the unqualified sense it might be stated "George Washington achieved greatness within his own lifetime", thus implying that "greatness" is a definite and identifiable quality. Application of the terms "great" and "greatness" is dependent on the perspective and subjective judgements of those who apply them. Whereas in some cases the perceived greatness of a person, place or object might be agreed upon by many, this is not necessarily the case, and the perception of greatness may be both fiercely contested and highly idiosyncratic.

Historically, in Europe, rulers were sometimes given the attribute "the Great", as in Alexander the Great, Frederick the Great, Alfred the Great and Catherine the Great. Starting with the Roman consul and general Pompey, the Latin equivalent Magnus was also used, as in Pompeius Magnus, Albertus Magnus, and Carolus Magnus. The English language uses the Latin term magnum opus, (literally "great work") to describe certain works of art and literature.

Since the publication of Francis Galton's Hereditary Genius in 1869, and especially with the accelerated development of intelligence tests in the early 1900s, there has been a vast amount of social scientific research published relative to the question of greatness. Much of this research does not actually use the term great in describing itself, preferring terms such as eminence, genius, exceptional achievement, etc. Historically the major intellectual battles over this topic have focused around the questions of nature versus nurture or person versus context. Today the importance of both dimensions is accepted by all, but disagreements over the relative importance of each are still reflected in variations in research emphases.

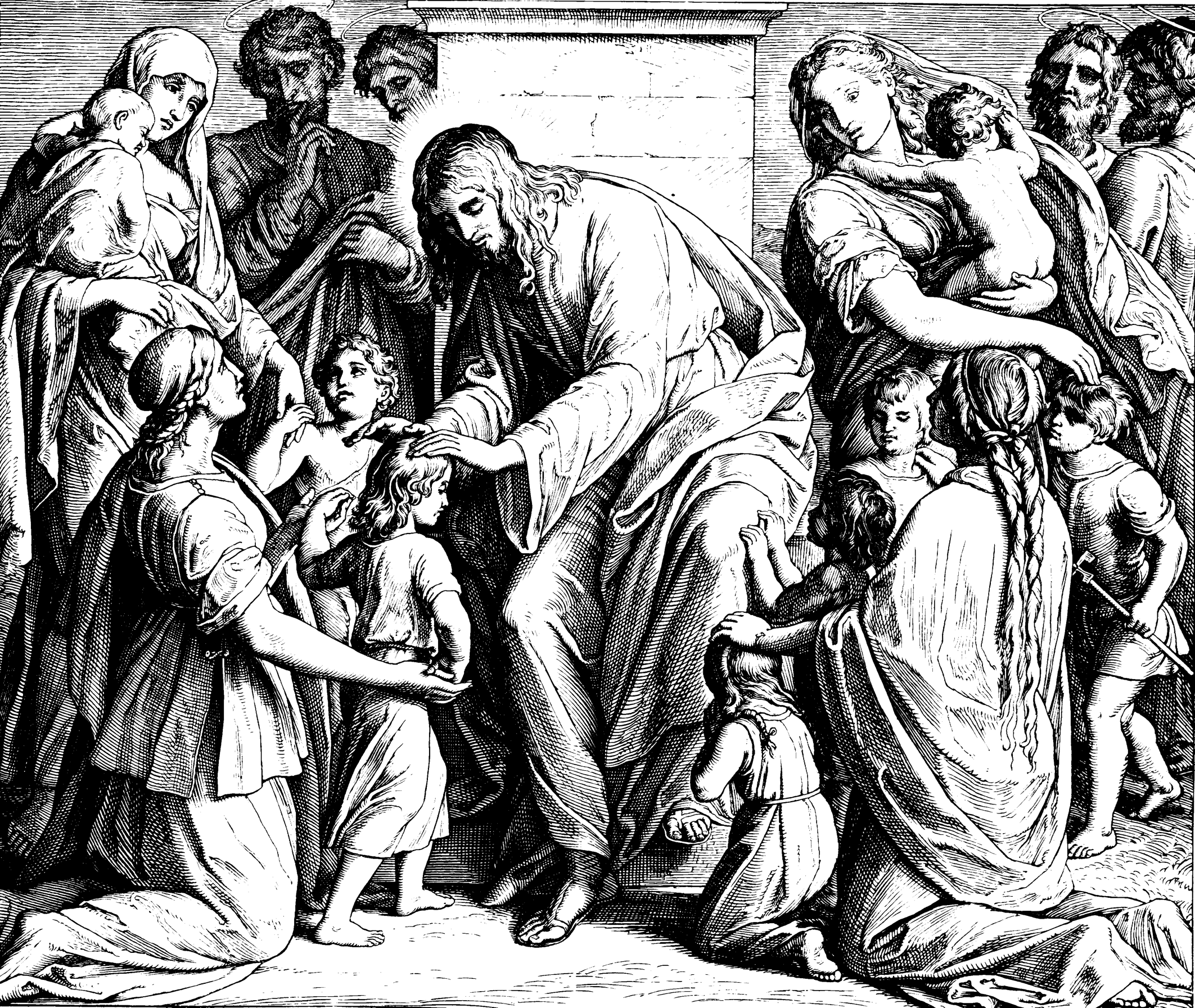
"Jesus teaches about greatness" (Matthew 18) by Julius Schnorr von Karolsfeld, 1860

== Genetic approaches ==
Early scientific research on greatness had a strong genetic emphasis and focused on intelligence as the driving force behind the concept.

=== Hereditary Genius – Galton (1869) ===
The earliest such research, Hereditary Genius, by Francis Galton (1869), argued that people vary hugely in "natural ability" which is allegedly inherited biologically. Those at the very top end of the range, i.e., geniuses, become according to Galton the "eminent" achievers of their generation. To prove this thesis Galton collected data showing that genius clusters in what he termed "Notable Family Lines", such as those of Bernoulli, Cassini, Darwin, Herschel, and Jussieu in science, or Bach in music.

Galton then calculated the odds of eminent people having eminent relations, taking into account the closeness of the biological connection (e.g., son vs grandson), and the magnitude of achievement of the eminent parent. His findings were as anticipated: the more famous the parent (i.e., the greater level of presumed "natural ability"), the greater likelihood there would be illustrious relatives; and the closer the blood tie, the greater those odds.

=== Early Mental Traits of 300 Geniuses – Cox (1926) ===
Catharine Cox's book on The Early Mental Traits of Three Hundred Geniuses (1926), was similar to Galton's in its orientation. Using the method that her mentor, Stanford Psychology Professor Lewis Terman, had developed for differentiating children in terms of intelligence, Cox coded records of childhood and adolescent achievements of 301 historic eminent leaders and creators to estimate what their IQs would have been on the basis of intellectual level of such achievements relative to the age at which they were accomplished. For example, John Stuart Mill reportedly studied Greek at 3, read Plato at 7, and learned calculus at 11. As such, what he was doing at 5, the average person couldn't do until 9 years, 6 months of age, giving Mill an estimated IQ of 190.

Cox found that the perceived eminence of those with the highest IQs was higher than that of those attaining lower IQ estimates, and that those with higher IQs also exhibited more versatility in their achievements. For example, da Vinci, Michelangelo, Descartes, Benjamin Franklin, Goethe, and others with IQs in the mid 160s or above were superior in their versatility to those attaining lower scores, such as George Washington, Palestrina, or Philip Sheridan.

The work of both Cox and Galton has been criticized for failing to take sufficient account of the role of nurture, or more specifically socio-economic and educational advantage, in the achievements of these historical greats.

== Cultural approach ==
There was one major anthropological study of genius, and it was triggered specifically by the author's contentions with Galton's work.

=== Configurations of Cultural Growth – Kroeber (1944) ===
Alfred Kroeber's Configurations of Cultural Growth (1944) looked at many of the same historic greats as did Galton and Cox, but from a completely different orientation. As a cultural anthropologist, Kroeber maintained that, in Simonton's words, "culture takes primacy over the individual in any account of human (behavior), and that historic geniuses are no exception..."

To prove his thesis, Kroeber collected "long lists of notable figures from several nationalities and historic eras", and then grouped them within a field and a shared cultural context, e.g., "Configuration for American Literature". Then within these groupings he listed his notables in "strict chronological order", identifying the most eminent figures by using capital letters for their surnames (e.g. EMERSON, LONGFELLOW, POE, WHITMAN, etc. in above configuration).

Kroeber found that genius never appeared in isolation, but rather, in Simonton's words, that "one genius cluster(ed) with others of greater and lesser fame in adjacent generations". He also found that there were historical "crests" and "troughs" in every field. These fluctuations in the appearance of genius were much too rapid to be explained by the simple mechanism of genetic inheritance along family lines.

Kroeber argued, in Simonton's words, that his "configurations" were due to "emulations": "Geniuses cluster in history because the key figures of one generation emulate those in the immediately preceding generations... (until) it attains a high point of perfection that stymies further growth". At this point the "tradition degenerates into empty imitation, as most creative minds move on to greener pastures".

Recent research is consistent with these explanations; but many aspects of the developmental process from birth to the attainment of greatness remain unaccounted for by Kroeber's anthropological approach.

== Developmental approaches ==
Retrospective studies, involving extensive interviews with individuals who have attained eminence, or at least exceptional levels of achievement, have added much to our understanding of the developmental process. Two studies in particular stand out.

=== Scientific Elite – Zuckerman (1977) ===
Harriet Zuckerman's Scientific Elite: Nobel Laureates in the United States, is based on many sources of research evidence, including a series of forty-one extended interviews with American winners of the Nobel Prize for science.

Zuckerman reported her results around two main topics: How the Prize is Awarded, and Career Development of the Scientific Elite. Her findings on the first topic are briefly overviewed in the Wikipedia article regarding the Nobel Prize

In relation to the question of the career development of the scientific elite Zuckerman uses the phrase "accumulation of advantage" to describe her findings. In her words: "Scientists who show promise early in their careers (are) given greater opportunities in the way of research training and facilities. To the extent that these scientists are as competent as the rest or more so, they ultimately will do far better in terms of both role performance and reward... rewards (which) can be transformed into resources for further work... (and hence over time) scientists who are initially advantaged gain even greater opportunities for further achievement and rewards."

To see if 'accumulation of advantage' was operating in the career development of the scientific elite, Zuckerman compared the careers of future laureates with those of "members of the United States National Academy of Sciences and the scientific rank and file" along a number of dimensions including socioeconomic origins, status of undergraduate and graduate education, the process of moving into the scientific elite, and first jobs and professorships.

She also interviewed forty-one Nobel laureates extensively about their "apprenticeships" to "master" scientists while they were doing their doctoral research, and other aspects of their career development related to the above topics.

Zuckerman concluded that evidence of "accumulative of advantage" was clearly present over the course of development, with result that her research "... cast(s) considerable doubt on the conclusion that marked differences in performance between the ultra-elite and other scientists reflect equally marked differences in their initial capacities to do scientific work".

=== Developing Talent in Young People – Bloom (1985) ===
Benjamin Bloom and five colleagues conducted extensive interviews with 120 "young men and women (as well as their parents and influential teachers)... who had reached the highest levels of accomplishment" in six fields – Olympic sprint swimmers, Top 10 rated professional tennis players, concert pianists, accomplished sculptors, exceptional mathematicians, and outstanding research neurologists.

They report many findings relevant to the "talent development process", including:

- Development was tied throughout to the values, interests, resources, and personal investments of the family of origin. In most families "introduction to the field and initial... skill development occurred" because the "(p)arents (or other family members), in pursuing their own interests, created situations that intrigued, interested, or involved the child... The child's interest was rewarded or encouraged..." and the parents then provided other ways to extend this interest.
- The "work ethic" is central to talent development. It is developed by "the home environment" and "...directly related to learning and participation in the chosen talent field".
- "Each group of parents strongly encouraged their children's development in a particularly highly approved talent field (related to the parents' own "special interests") and gave much less support to other possible talent fields and activities."
- "Families and teachers were crucial at every point along the way to excellence... what families and teachers do at different times and how they do it clearly sets the stage for exceptional learning in each talent field".
- "Few... (of the) individuals (included in this study) were regarded as child prodigies"; and, as a result, this research "raises (serious) questions about earlier views of special gifts and innate abilities as necessary prerequisites of talent development".

== Recent approaches ==
A 1995 book by Hans Eysenck argues that a "personality trait" called Psychoticism is central to becoming a creative genius; and a more recent book by Bill Dorris (2009) looks at the influence of "everything from genetics to cultural crises", including chance, over the course of development of those who attain greatness. See – Hans Eysenck, Genius: The Natural History of Creativity (1995), "construct(s)... a model of genius and creativity" whose "novelty lies in (its) attempt to make personality differences central to the argument".

In particular Eysenck is interested in a personality trait called "psychoticism ... chief among (whose) cognitive features is a tendency to over-inclusiveness, i.e., an inclination not to limit one's associations to relevant ideas, memories, images, etc."

He considers a massive range of experimental psychological research in order to establish the underlying genetic, neuro-chemical mechanisms which may be operating to influence levels of creativity associated with fluctuations in "the tendency towards over-inclusiveness indicative of psychoticism..."

Eysenck's assessment of his overall argument is as follows: "There is no hint that the theory is more than a suggestion of how many disparate facts and hypotheses can be pulled together into a causal chain, explaining... the apogee of human endeavour – genius. If the theory has one point in its favour it is that every step can be tested experimentally, and that many steps have already received positive support from such testing."

The Arrival of The Fittest

Bill Dorris's book, The Arrival of The Fittest: How The Great Become Great (2009), attempts to address a number of issues which remain unanswered on the subject. These include the role of chance over the course of development, the importance of the development of unique personal characteristics to achieving greatness, and the influence of changes in the wider worlds surrounding the person – from interpersonal to societal - on the course of an individual's development.

Dorris argues that those who attain 'greatness' are credited with solving a key generational problem in a field and/or society (e.g., Albert Einstein resolving the conflict between Isaac Newton and James Clerk Maxwell in physics at the outset of the 20th century; or Woody Guthrie providing a voice for the outcasts of the Great Depression of the 1930s).

Dorris's core argument is that those who become 'great' start out with sufficient genetic potential and then are able, over two or more decades, to obtain matches/fits with "the right kind of problems" to extend the development of these genetic biases into what Dorris terms, "key characteristics". These are the intellectual, personality, and self characteristics which eventually turn out to be required to solve a key generational problem in their field and/or society.

Dorris argues that there are four types of matching processes which occur over the course of such development. These refer to matches between the developmental needs of the person and the opportunities and resources essential to engaging in problem solving activities that stimulate further development of those aspects of intelligence, personality, and self which eventually become key characteristics.

Two of these matching processes are covered extensively in the existing research literature: continuous matching and cumulative matching.

The other two of the matching processes described by Dorris are completely new to this book: catalytic matching and chaotic matching.

Dorris's argument in relation to catalytic matching is that anyone who eventually becomes a 'great' will have experienced one or more sustained periods of exceptionally accelerated development of their key characteristics, accelerations which serve massively to differentiate them from their former peers in terms of both development and visibility within the field.

This acceleration occurs because the person becomes the focal point (star) of a self-reinforcing system of expertise and resources (catalytic system) which thrives off this person's accelerated development and visibility.

Dorris's argument in relation to chaotic matching is that access to the resources and learning opportunities essential to the development of key characteristics of an eventual 'great' often occurs not due to the efforts/planning of the individual, but simply due to chance events in the interpersonal, institutional or societal worlds around the person, who (unlike perhaps millions of equally capable peers) becomes the beneficiary of these chance events – events which Dorris argues can change a person's entire future in much the same way as a lottery jackpot or a Titanic ticket.

Dorris documents his theoretical arguments with extensive case studies of a wide range of individuals, including Einstein, Elvis, Monet, Mozart, da Vinci, Abraham Lincoln, Watson and Crick, basketball great Bill Russell, Louis Armstrong, Bill Gates, Alfred Hitchcock, Woody Guthrie, and Norma Jeane/Marilyn Monroe.

== See also ==
- Great man theory
- Genius
- Giftedness
- Kindness
