= Herschel family =

Coat of arms of the Herschel family

The Herschel family is a famous Anglo-German family of astronomers who lived from the 18th to the 20th century. The family originated from Pirna in Saxony which lies near Dresden.

== Notable members ==
- Isaak Herschel, father of William Herschell
  - Caroline Herschel (1750–1848), astronomer and singer, sister of William Herschel
  - William Herschel (1738–1822), astronomer and composer, discoverer of Uranus
    - John Herschel (1792–1871), mathematician and astronomer, son of William Herschel
      - Alexander Stewart Herschel (1836–1907), astronomer, son of John Herschell and grandson of William Herschel
      - William James Herschel (1833–1917), pioneer of fingerprinting, son of John Herschel, grandson of William Herschel
      - John Herschel the Younger (1837–1921), military engineer, son of John Herschell, grandson of Sir William Herschel

== See also ==
- Herschel (name), other people with this surname, as well as with this name as a given name
