= Alexander Herschel =

Alexander Herschel may refer to:

- Alexander Stewart Herschel (1836-1907), British astronomer
- Johann Alexander Herschel (1745-1821), German musician and telescope maker
