= William Herschel (disambiguation) =

William Herschel was a British astronomer and composer who became famous for discovering the planet Uranus.

William Herschel may also refer to:

- Sir William Herschel, 2nd Baronet (1833–1917), British officer

== See also ==
- William Herschel Telescope
- William Herschel Museum
