= Society for the History of Astronomy =

Organisation based in the United Kingdom

- Abbreviation: SHA
- Formation: 2002 (24 years ago)
- Legal status: Society
- Location: United Kingdom
- Official language: English
- Chair: Carolyn Kennett
- Main organ: Antiquarian Astronomer
- Affiliations: Royal Astronomical Society Birmingham and Midland Institute.
- Website: Society for the History of Astronomy

The Society for the History of Astronomy is an organisation based in the United Kingdom that promotes research into the history of astronomy particularly at the ‘grassroots’ level. It publishes a refereed journal called The Antiquarian Astronomer and a less formal Bulletin.

== The Society ==
The Society for the History of Astronomy was founded in 2002 to promote the study of the history of astronomy by hosting talks by members and publishing new research into the field. One main objective is to encourage research into past astronomers who have previously been neglected within the history of science. Some of its members are professional historians of science but most are amateur historians.

The Society owes much to the enthusiasm of its first Treasurer, Ken Goward, and its first Secretary, A. Stuart Williams.

The honorary president was previously Dr Allan Chapman of Wadham College, Oxford, and since his death the position is vacant. The honorary vice-presidents are Emily Winterburn (who was chair at the time of foundation) and Prof. Mike Edmunds. Previous vice-presidents have included Sir Patrick Moore, Sir Arnold Wolfendale, FRS, and Dr Michael Hoskin.

The society normally hosts two one-day conferences at venues across the United Kingdom each year. A Bulletin is published twice yearly containing articles and news items about astronomical history. The Bulletin includes short reports of original research by members.

The society maintains a library of publications of importance to the history of the science. The reference section is named for Sir Robert Ball and the lending section is named for Sir Patrick Moore. The library is located at the Birmingham and Midland Institute in central Birmingham. The society also holds an archive.

== Survey of Astronomical History ==
One of the society's major activities is organising a Survey of Astronomical History in the form of lists of historical astronomers and observatories in each of the old counties of Britain and Ireland. This has been motivated by a desire to promote research into local astronomical activities that have previously been neglected.

== The Antiquarian Astronomer ==
The society publishes annually a refereed journal called The Antiquarian Astronomer containing new research into the history of astronomy, particularly articles written by members. Published papers have discussed activities in major observatories, scientific research by individuals of particular note, scientific instrument makers, and the activities of prominent amateur astronomers.

The first issue appeared in 2004. Back issues are available through the SAO/NASA Astrophysics Data System (ADS).

== The Bulletin ==
The society publishes an bi-annual Bulletin containing news relating to the study of the history of astronomy and the organisation's activities. The Bulletin also includes short research articles and notes by members. It was previously called News (editions 1–4, 2002–2004) and Newsletter (editions 5–17, 2004–2008). Articles are indexed in the SAO/NASA Astrophysics Data System but scans are not currently available. Digital versions are available online.

== Chairs ==
Emily Winterburn MSc	2002–2004
Gilbert Satterthwaite FRAS	2004–2010
Madeline Cox FRAS	2011–2015
Bob Bower FRAS	2015–2018
Gerard Gilligan	2018-2023
Carolyn Kennett	2023-date

== Picnics ==
One feature of this society is an annual summer picnic. Past picnics have been held at:-

5 July 2003 Wadham College, Oxford

3 July 2004 Woolsthorpe Manor

6 August 2005 Wadham College, Oxford

8 July 2006 ‘Farthings’, Selsey

16 June 2007 Pendrell Hall, Staffordshire

2 August 2008 Marlborough College, Wiltshire

4 July 2009 Hanwell Community Observatory

17 July 2010 Stonyhurst College

16 July 2011 Orwell Park, Suffolk

9 June 2012 Carr House, Much Hoole

29 June 2013 Mill Hill Observatory

12 July 2014 National Maritime Museum, Greenwich

4 July 2015 Woolsthorpe Manor

2 July 2016 Hanwell Community Observatory

1 July 2017 Liverpool City Centre

30 June 2018 Seething Observatory, Norwich

29 June 2019 Norman Lockyer Observatory, Sidmouth, Devon

2020 and 2021 no picnic held

25 June 2022 19 New King Street, Bath (to coincide with the bi-centenary of the death of William Herschel)

1 July 2023 Jeremiah Horrocks Observatory, Moor Park, Preston

21 June 2024 Rugby School

27 June 2025 Jodrell Bank Observatory

13-15 June 2026 Birr Castle, Newgrange, & Dunsink Observatory

== See also ==
- List of astronomical societies
