= Hirsch =

Hirsch (German for "deer", "stag") is a German surname and a Yiddish masculine given name. Notable people with the surname include:

== Surname ==
- Afua Hirsch (born 1981), Norwegian-born British writer, broadcaster, and former barrister
- Alex Hirsch (born 1985), American animator, screenwriter and voice actor
- August Hirsch (1817–1894), German physician and medical historian
- Burkhard Hirsch (1930–2020), German politician and civil liberties advocate
- Cal Hirsch, 19th century American retailer
- Carl Christian Hirsch (born 1985), German politician
- Corey Hirsch (born 1972), Canadian ice hockey player
- Daniëlle Hirsch (born 1968), Dutch politician
- David Hirsch (disambiguation), several people
- Edward Hirsch (born 1950), American poet and critic
- E. D. Hirsch (born 1928), American educator and literary critic
- Eike Christian Hirsch (1937–2022), German journalist, author and television presenter
- Elroy Hirsch (1923–2004), American football player
- Emanuel Hirsch (1888–1972), German Protestant theologian
- Emil G. Hirsch (1851–1923), American rabbi
- Emile Hirsch (born 1985), American actor
- Emile Hirsch (painter) (1832–1904), French stained glass artist
- Faye Hirsch (born 1956), American writer, art critic, editor, and educator
- Felix Hirsch (1902–1982), German-American journalist and historian
- Francine Hirsch, American historian
- Fred Hirsch (economist) (1931-1978), Austrian-born British economist
- Fredy Hirsch (1916–1944), German athlete, sports teacher, and youth leader
- Gary Hirsch (born 1987), Swiss racing driver
- Geoffrey Hirsch, American politician
- George A. Hirsch (born 1934), American magazine publisher
- George Hirsch (musician) (born 1984), American musician
- Helmut Hirsch (1916–1937), German Jew and victim of the Nazis
- Jack Hirsch (born c. 1941), American basketball player
- Joe Hirsch (1928–2009), American horse racing columnist
- John Hirsch (1930–1989), Hungarian-Canadian theater director
- John A. Hirsch (1861–1938), American politician
- Jorge E. Hirsch (born 1953), Argentine American physicist
- Judd Hirsch (born 1935), American actor
- Julio Hirsch (born 1956), Argentine actor
- Julius Hirsch (1892–1945), Jewish German footballer and Holocaust victim
- Kurt Hirsch (1906–1986), German mathematician
- Maïa Hirsch (born 2003), French basketball player
- Maurice Hirsch (footballer) (born 1993), German footballer
- Maurice de Hirsch (1831–1896), German businessman and philanthropist
- Max Hirsch (labor economist) (1832–1905), German political economist and politician
- Max Hirsch (economist) (1852–1909), German-Australian businessman and economist
- Morris Hirsch (born 1933) American mathematician
- Moshe Hirsch (1923/1924–2010), Israeli politician
- Moshe Hillel Hirsch, American/Israeli rabbi
- Otto Hirsch (1885–1941), German Jewish jurist and politician
- Paul Hirsch (politician) (1868–1940), German politician
- Paul Hirsch (bibliophile) (1881–1951), German industrialist, musicologist and bibliophile
- Paul Hirsch (film editor) (born 1945), American film editor
- Peter Hirsch (disambiguation), several people
- Rahel Hirsch (1870–1953), German physician and professor
- Richard Hirsch (born 1944), American ceramic sculptor
- Robert L. Hirsch (fl. from 1979), energy research scientist
- Samson Raphael Hirsch (1808–1888), German rabbi
- Samuel Hirsch (1815–1889), German rabbi
- Slavko Hirsch (1893–1942), Croatian physician
- Sidney Mttron Hirsch (1883–1962), American model and playwright
- Stefan Hirsch (1899–1964), American artist
- Steven Hirsch (born 1961), adult entertainment executive
- Tomás Hirsch (born 1956), Chilean politician and businessman
- Werner Z. Hirsch (1920–2009), German-born American economist

== Given name ==
- Hirsch Bernstein (1846–1907), Russian-American editor and publisher
- Hirsch Bär Fassel (1802–1883), rabbi and philosopher from Austria-Hungary
- Hirsch Janow (1733–1785), Polish rabbi
- Hirsch Loeb Sabsovich (1860–1915), Russian-born Jewish American agronomist, chemist, agricultural educator, and activist

== See also ==
- Hersch, Hersh, Herschel, Hirsch, Hirche, Tsvi-Hirsh, Zebi Hirsch
