= Spins =

Adverse reaction of intoxication

The spins (as in having "the spins") is an adverse reaction of intoxication that causes a state of vertigo and nausea, causing one to feel as if "spinning out of control", especially when lying down. It is most commonly associated with drunkenness or mixing alcohol with other psychoactive drugs such as cannabis. This state is likely to cause vomiting, but having "the spins" is not life-threatening unless pulmonary aspiration occurs.

== Symptoms ==
The most common general symptom of having the spins is described by its name: the feeling that one has the uncontrollable sense of spinning, although one is not in motion, which is one of the main reasons an intoxicated person may vomit. The person has this feeling due to impairments in vision and equilibrioception (sense of balance). Diplopia (double vision) or polyplopia are common, as well as the symptoms of motion sickness and vertigo.

== Causes ==
=== Alcohol ===
Ingesting a great deal of alcohol in a short amount of time causes alcohol to quickly enter the bloodstream.

Mixing alcohol with normal soft drinks, rather than diet drinks, delays the dizzying effects of alcohol because the sugary mixture slows the emptying of the stomach, so that drunkenness occurs less rapidly.

The dizzying effects of alcohol upset the fragile mechanism that the inner ear uses to balance.

Balance in the body is monitored principally by two systems, both of which are affected by alcohol sending abnormal impulses to the brain, [which tells it] that the body is rotating, causing disorientation and making the eyes spin round to compensate.

This "upset" has been seen in experiments in which human subjects were given clinical tests of the vestibular system before and after ingesting alcohol. The alcohol apparently causes the ampullary cupula in the semicircular canal to become lighter than the surrounding fluid (endolymph), which causes the system to become sensitive to gravity in addition to rotational acceleration.

=== Poly drug use ===
==== Alcohol and cannabis ====
Intoxication from both alcohol and cannabis is known as being cross faded, although the term is also used less commonly for combinations of other substances.

The spins are often reported when alcohol is mixed with cannabis, since both may cause dizziness and magnify each other's effects. Smoking after drinking especially intensifies the effects of the alcohol, often resulting in nausea.

== Treatment and prevention ==
Since at least some of the symptoms of "the spins" can be attributed to alcohol's disturbance of the vestibular system, many symptom relief strategies are based on increasing the body's ability to use other senses to regain balance. In addition to the vestibular system, vision and touch information from the body are extremely important in maintaining balance. In fact, the vestibular system is not necessary at all to maintain standing balance unless information from the other two systems becomes inadequate.

Keeping one foot flat on the ground while trying to sleep is one popular self-treatment for people whose dizziness is exacerbated by lying down with eyes closed. There is no direct scientific evidence to support this treatment, however it is consistent with studies showing that postural balance responses to high and low speed tilts are primarily driven by force and velocity receptors in the muscles with relatively little input from the vestibular system.

One way to mask the symptoms of the spins is to avoid staring at moving objects, such as people who are dancing or ceiling fans. Instead, it helps to stare at a non-moving object and slowly blink a few times. However, it will make things worse to keep one's eyes closed for an extended period. In minor cases of the spins, simply sitting alone in a quiet place or taking a walk is all it takes to make them subside.

The best ways to avoid the spins are to continuously keep monitoring one's alcohol intake, which involves limiting one's intake to a reasonable level and to eat before drinking, which allows alcohol to be metabolized more efficiently and steadily, while also keeping blood sugar levels more even. Certain foods, such as crackers and cheese, have the right levels of carbohydrates, fat, and protein to help further slow the emptying of one's stomach.

== In popular culture ==
Someone getting or having the spins is mentioned in several books, including: Being Irish by Joseph Keefe, The Girls' Guide to Surviving a Break-Up by Delphine Hirsh, The Stranger Guide to Seattle by Paula Gilovich and Traci Vogel, Rag Man by Pete Hautman, The Tin Roof Blowdown by James Lee Burke. Visual depictions of the imbalance or dizziness associated with drunkenness were also featured in Mabel's Strange Predicament and other Charlie Chaplin movies. The cause of the spins is also described in Season 1, Episode 10 of the Netflix Original Series Daredevil during a discussion between two main characters, Matt Murdock and Foggy Nelson, after a night of drinking. Murdock confirms when asked by Nelson that he still gets the spins despite being blind due to disturbed equilibrium of the fluid in the inner ear. In the film Frances Ha, Benji tells Frances that placing one foot on the ground as she lies down on her bed will somewhat alleviate the spins. Later in the film, she teaches this new trick to her friend Sophie. The Pittsburgh rapper, Mac Miller's album K.I.D.S featured a track titled "The Spins". Danger Ronnie and the Spins associate this into their name and music. Rock musician and Korn guitarist Brian "Head" Welch references experiencing the spins during his time as an alcoholic and drug addict. He mentions the symptoms were particularly noticeable when laying down with his eyes closed. These references were made in his self-debuted album track "Flush". The Philadelphia band Modern Baseball make reference to the spins in their 2014 track Rock Bottom, from the album You're Gonna Miss It All.
