= Heidi Jo Newberg =

American astrophysicist

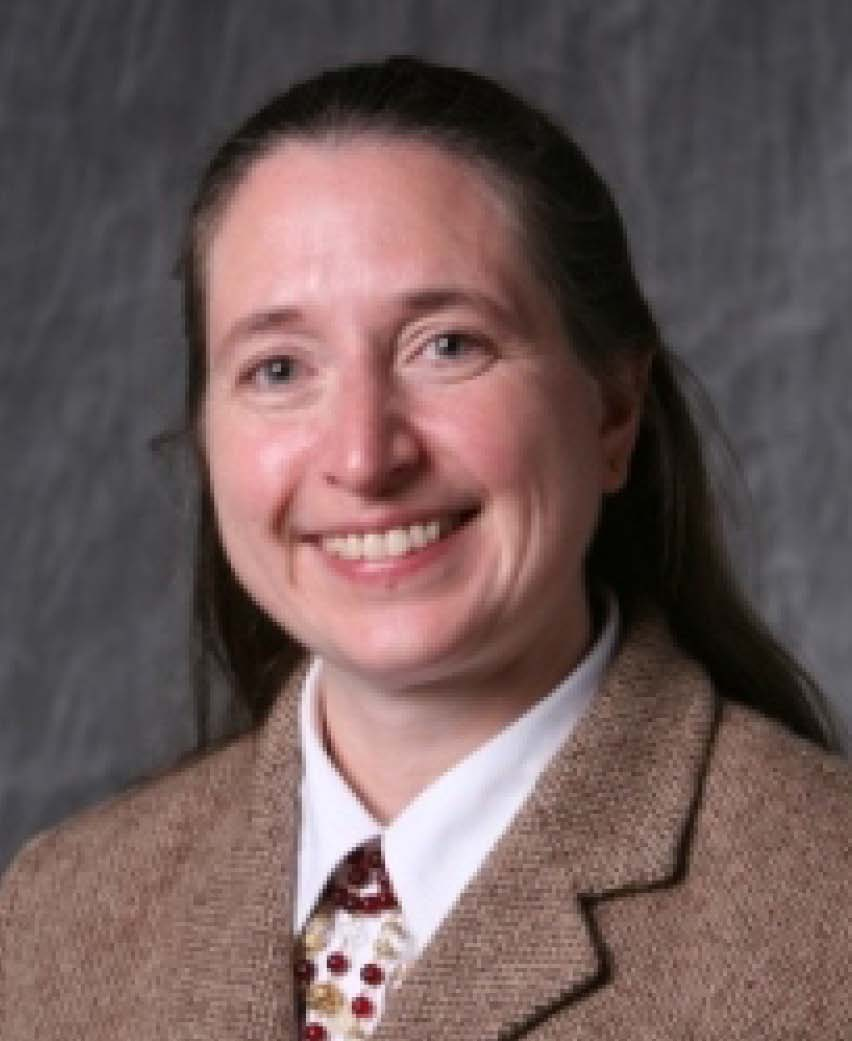
- Photograph by Kris Qua, Rensselaer Polytechnic Institute
- Born: Washington, D.C.
- Education: University of California, Berkeley (Ph.D. 1992); Rensselaer Polytechnic Institute (B.Sc. 1987)
- Known for: Structure of the Milky Way galaxy
- Awards: Gruber Prize in Cosmology (2007, shared); Breakthrough Prize in Fundamental Physics (2015, shared)
- Scientific career
- Fields: Astrophysics
- Workplaces: Fermilab, Rensselaer Polytechnic Institute
- Doctoral advisor: Richard A. Muller

Heidi Jo Newberg (née Marvin) is an American astrophysicist known for her work in understanding the structure of our Milky Way galaxy. Among her team's findings are that the Milky Way is cannibalizing stars from smaller galaxies and that the Milky Way is larger and has more ripples than was previously understood. She is a founding participant in the Sloan Digital Sky Survey (SDSS) and the Sloan Extension for Galactic Understanding and Exploration (SEGUE), and is a leader of the astrophysical MilkyWay@home volunteer computing project team. She is a professor in the Department of Physics, Applied Physics, and Astronomy at Rensselaer Polytechnic Institute (RPI) in Troy, New York, US, and a Fellow of the American Physical Society.

== Career ==
Newberg received her bachelor's degree in Physics from the Rensselaer Polytechnic Institute in 1987. She received her Ph.D. in Physics from the University of California, Berkeley in 1992, working on the Berkeley Automated Supernova Search, which measured the supernova rates as a function of supernova type in Virgo-distance galaxies; and the Supernova Cosmology Project, which measured the cosmological parameters Omega and Lambda using the light curves of distant supernovae, and provided strong evidence that the expansion of our universe is accelerating. In 2007, she shared the Gruber Prize in Cosmology along with the other members of the Supernova Cosmology Project and in 2011 the group's lead won the Nobel Prize in Physics. Newberg shared the 2015 Breakthrough Prize in Fundamental Physics along with other members of the Supernova Cosmology Project.

At Fermilab, she worked on the Sloan Digital Sky Survey starting in 1992, and the Sloan Extension for Galactic Understanding and Exploration. She has been a member of the faculty of Rensselaer Polytechnic Institute since 1999. Newberg has been the director of the Hirsch Observatory since 2001 and was the president of the board of trustees of the Dudley Observatory 2010–2021. In 2012, she was elected a Fellow of the American Physical Society "for her contributions to our understanding of the structure of the Milky Way and the universe and for the development software and hardware infrastructure for measuring and extracting meaningful information from large astronomical survey data sets."

She has published papers in diverse areas of galactic and extragalactic astronomy, including: supernova phenomenology, measuring cosmological parameters from supernovae, galaxy photometry, color selection of QSOs, properties of stars, and the structure of our galaxy.

== Personal life ==
Newberg was born in Washington, D.C. She is married to Lee Newberg and has four children.
