= Emily Winterburn =

British writer, physicist and historian of science

- Education: University of Manchester; Imperial College London
- Writing career
- Notable works: The Quiet Revolution of Caroline Herschel (2017); The Stargazer's Guide; The Astronomers Royal

Emily Winterburn is a British science writer, physicist and historian of science based in Yorkshire. She is a visiting Fellow at the University of Leeds. Among other books, she wrote The Quiet Revolution of Caroline Herschel, published by The History Press in 2017.

== Early life and education ==
Winterburn studied originally at Acton High School. Winterburn studied physics at the University of Manchester. She remained there to complete a Masters in the History of Science, focussing on Ernest Rutherford and the Manchester physics department between 1907 and 1919.

== Career ==
Winterburn joined the Royal Observatory, Greenwich, as a curator looking after astrophysical objects collected from 1250 to the present day. Whilst at the Royal Observatory, Winterburn published The Astronomers Royal. She appeared on Melvyn Bragg's In Our Time in 2007, discussing optics. Alongside curating, Winterburn began a PhD at Imperial College London, studying the Herschel family. In 2011, she submitted her PhD thesis, The Herschels: a scientific family in training. Her thesis was well received by the historical science communities.

In 2009, Winterburn joined the University of Leeds Museum of Science as a curator. That year, she published The Stargazer's Guide: How to Read Our Night Sky with HarperCollins. Winterburn is an expert on the Herschel family and Islamic astronomical instruments. She won the 2014 Notes & Records of the Royal Society essay prize for her essay Philomaths, Herschel, and the myth of the self-taught man. She was part of the 2015 Royal Society celebration for International Women's Day, where she discussed girls' participation in scientific education and society. She contributed to the Springer Publishing book The Scientific Legacy of William Herschel. Winterburn has also written for popular periodicals, including Astronomy Now magazine.

Having published extensively on the Herschel family, Winterburn began to write The Quiet Revolution of Caroline Herschel in 2012. The Quiet Revolution of Caroline Herschel focuses on the ten most productive years of Caroline Herschel's academic career, working with her brother William Herschel's telescope and finding comets. The book was published in 2017 and has been described as a "terrific read".

=== Books ===
- 2005 The Astronomers Royal
- 2009 The Stargazer's Guide: How to Read Our Night Sky
- 2017 The Quiet Revolution of Caroline Herschel: the Lost Heroine of Astronomy
