= William van Praagh =

British educator (1845–1907)

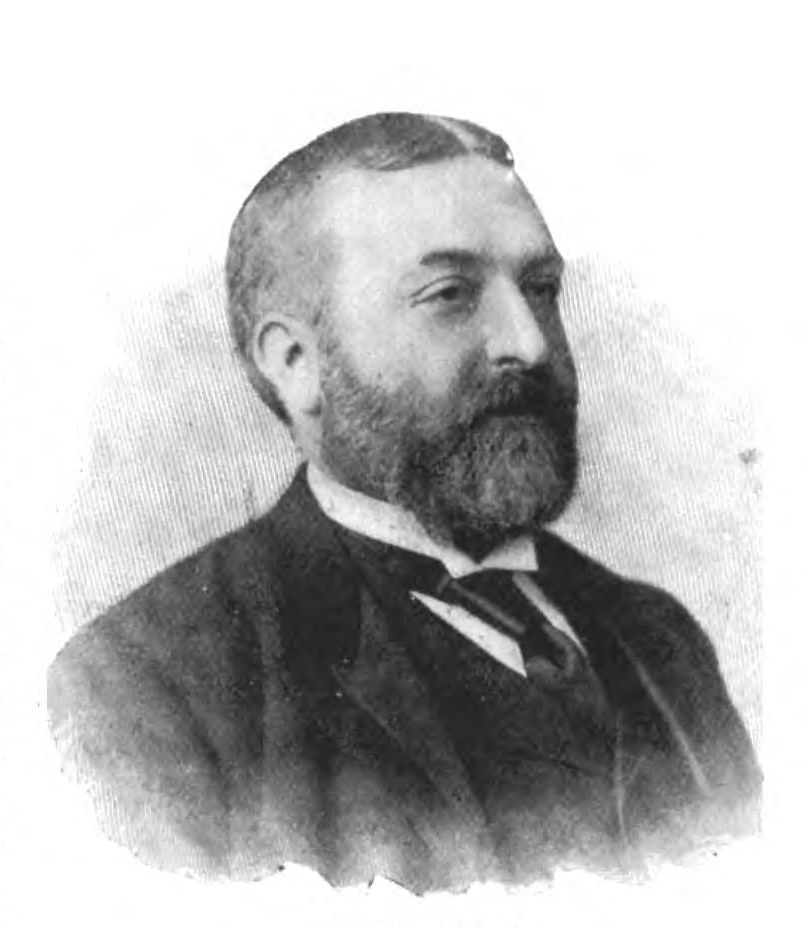
- Born: Wolf Saloman van Praagh; 11 June 1845; Rotterdam, The Netherlands
- Died: 28 June 1907 (aged 62); London, United Kingdom
- Burial place: Willesden Jewish Cemetery
- Spouse: Emily van Praagh (m. 1872)

William van Praagh (11 June 1845 – 28 June 1907) was a British educator. He pioneered the Oralist method for the education of the deaf in England.

== Biography ==
Wolf Saloman van Praagh was born into a Jewish family in Rotterdam in 1845.

From 1859, he studied under David Hirsch, director of the Rotterdam School for the Deaf and Dumb, who had introduced the oral system of teaching the deaf from Germany into Holland. In 1866, van Praagh was invited to manage the newly established Jews' Deaf and Dumb Home in London. He took the name William upon settling in England.

Van Praagh's "Pure Oral System" attracted the attention of Anne Thackeray and other members of the press. In 1871 he published the pamphlet Plan for the Establishment of Day-Schools for the Deaf and Dumb, which became a catalyst for the development of day schools for deaf students in England. He was critical of residential schools for the deaf, emphasizing the importance of allowing deaf students to interact with non-deaf individuals outside of school hours.

In 1870, van Praagh became director of the Association for the Oral Instruction of the Deaf and Dumb, a nonsectarian institution founded by Juliana Baroness Mayer de Rothschild. Under his leadership, the association established the Normal School and Training College for Teachers in 1872. He remained the institution's director until his death, training a generation of educators in the Oralist system. Van Praagh also founded the National Union of Teachers upon the Pure Oral Method shortly after the passing of the Elementary Education (Blind and Deaf Children) Act in 1893.

Van Praagh died on 28 June 1907 following a sudden attack of angina pectoris after his annual public demonstration of the lip-reading system in Fitzroy Square. His last words were reportedly, "Gentlemen, I have finished."

== Personal life ==
William van Praagh married Emily van Praagh, daughter of Morris van Praagh, in February 1872. They together had four sons and two daughters. His granddaughter was the ballet dancer Peggy van Praagh.

Van Praagh was a member of the Committee of the Netherlands Benevolent Society, and a Past Master of the Athenaeum Lodge no. 1491. He was affiliated with the Bayswater Synagogue in Westminster.

== Honours ==
In recognition of his contributions to the education of the deaf, van Praagh was named an Officier d'Académie by the French Ministry of Public Instruction and Fine Arts in 1884.

== Selected publications ==
- Plan for the Establishment of Day Schools for the Deaf and Dumb. London: Trübner & Co. 1871.
- "On the Oral Education of the Deaf and Dumb". Journal of Education. London: Association for the Oral Instruction of the Deaf. 1878.
- On Training Colleges for Teachers of the Deaf and Dumb. 1882.
- Lessons for the Instruction of Deaf and Dumb Children in Speaking, Lip-Reading, Reading, and Writing. London: Trübner & Co. 1884.
- "Oral Instruction of the Deaf and Dumb". International Health Exhibition, London 1884. Vol. 11. London: W. Clowes. 1884. pp. 79–88.
- "Defective Articulation Resulting from Cleft Palate". Transactions of the Odontological Society of Great Britain. June 1888.
- "Deaf and Dumb". The Storehouse of General Information. Vol. 3. London, Paris & Melbourne: Cassell & Co. 1892. pp. 349–352.
- Lip-Reading for the Deaf (6th ed.). 1900.
