= Hereditarianism =

View that genetics plays a major role in determining human behavior

Hereditarianism is the view that heredity plays a central role in determining human nature and character traits, such as intelligence and personality. Hereditarians believe in the power of genetic influences to explain human behavior and solve human social-political problems. They stress the value of evolutionary explanations in all areas of the human sciences.

Most prominently in intelligence research, proponents argue that genetic predisposition determines individual life outcomes more than do either structured environmental influences (i.e. nurture) or developmental noise.

The idea that genetic predisposition determines differences in life outcomes between racial groups, sometimes termed racial hereditarianism, is rejected by mainstream science on empirical and methodological grounds, and considered a form of scientific racism.

== Overview ==
Social scientist Barry Mehler defines hereditarianism as "the belief that a substantial part of both group and individual differences in human behavioral traits are caused by genetic differences". Hereditarianism is sometimes used as a synonym for biological or genetic determinism, though some scholars distinguish the two terms. When distinguished, biological determinism is used to mean that heredity is the only factor. Supporters of hereditarianism reject this sense of biological determinism for most cases. However, in some cases genetic determinism is true; for example, Matt Ridley describes Huntington's disease as "pure fatalism, undiluted by environmental variability". In other cases, hereditarians would see no role for genes; for example, the condition of "not knowing a word of Chinese" has nothing to do (directly) with genes.

Hereditarians point to the heritability of cognitive ability, and the outsized influence that cognitive ability has on life outcomes, as evidence in favor of the hereditarian viewpoint. According to Plomin and Van Stumm (2018), "Intelligence is highly heritable and predicts important educational, occupational and health outcomes better than any other trait." Estimates for the heritability of intelligence range from 20% in infancy to 80% in adulthood.

== History ==
Francis Galton is generally considered the father of hereditarianism. In his book Hereditary Genius (1869), Galton pioneered research on the heredity of intelligence. Galton continued research into the heredity of human behavior in his later works, including "The History of Twins" (1875) and Inquiries into Human Faculty and Its Development (1883).

The Bell Curve (1994), by psychologist Richard Herrnstein and political scientist Charles Murray, argued that the heritability of cognitive ability, combined with a modern American society in which cognitive ability is the leading determinant of success, was leading to an increasingly rich and segregated "cognitive elite". Herrnstein and Murray also examined how cognitive ability predicts socially desirable behavior. They also discussed the debate regarding race and intelligence, concluding that the evidence to date didn't justify an estimate on the degree of influence of genetics versus environmental causes for average differences in IQ test performance between racial groups. Today the scientific consensus is that genetics does not explain such differences, and that they are rather environmental in origin.

Cognitive psychologist Steven Pinker, in his book The Blank Slate (2002), argues that biology explains much more about human nature than people generally acknowledge.

== Political implications ==
In 1949, Nicolas Pastore claimed that hereditarians were more likely to be conservative, that they view social and economic inequality as a natural result of variation in talent and character. Consequently, they explain class and race differences as the result of partly genetic group differences. Pastore contrasted this with the claim that behaviorists were more likely to be liberals or leftists, that they believe economic disadvantage and structural problems in the social order were to blame for group differences.

However, the historical correspondence between hereditarianism and conservatism has broken down at least among proponents of hereditarianism. Philosopher Peter Singer describes his vision of a new liberal political view that embraces hereditarianism in his 1999 book, A Darwinian Left.

== Criticism ==
Ronald C. Bailey argues that hereditarianism is based on five fallacious assumptions. In a 1997 paper, he also wrote that "...behavior geneticists will continue to be very limited in their ability to partition the effects of genes, the environment, and their covariance and interaction on human behavior and cognitive ability."

== See also ==
- Behavioural genetics – Study of genetic-environment interactions influencing behaviour
- Biological determinism – Research paradigm in behavioural genetics
- Eugenics – Effort to improve purported human genetic quality
- Nature versus nurture – Long-standing debate in biology and society
- Neo-Darwinism – Used to describe the combination of natural selection and genetics
- Scientific racism – Pseudoscientific justification for racism
- Social Darwinism – Group of pseudoscientific theories and societal practices
- Sociobiology – Subdiscipline of biology regarding social behavior
