= David Hirsch =

David Hirsch may refer to:

- David Hirsch (educator) (1813–1895), German educator of the deaf
- David Philip Hirsch (1896–1917), British Army officer and Victoria Cross recipient
- Wolfgang Heinz (actor) (1900–1984, born as David Hirsch), Austrian and East German actor
- David A. Hirsch (born 1960), American businessman and activist
- David Hirsch (television personality) (born 1962), American television personality
- David Hirsch (rabbi) (born 1968), American rabbi

== See also ==
- David Hirsh (born 1967), sociologist
- David Julian Hirsh (born 1973), Canadian actor
