= Middlesbrough meteorite =

Meteorite that crashed in Middlesbrough, North Yorkshire, England, on 14 March 1881

Coordinates: 54.558°N 1.216°W

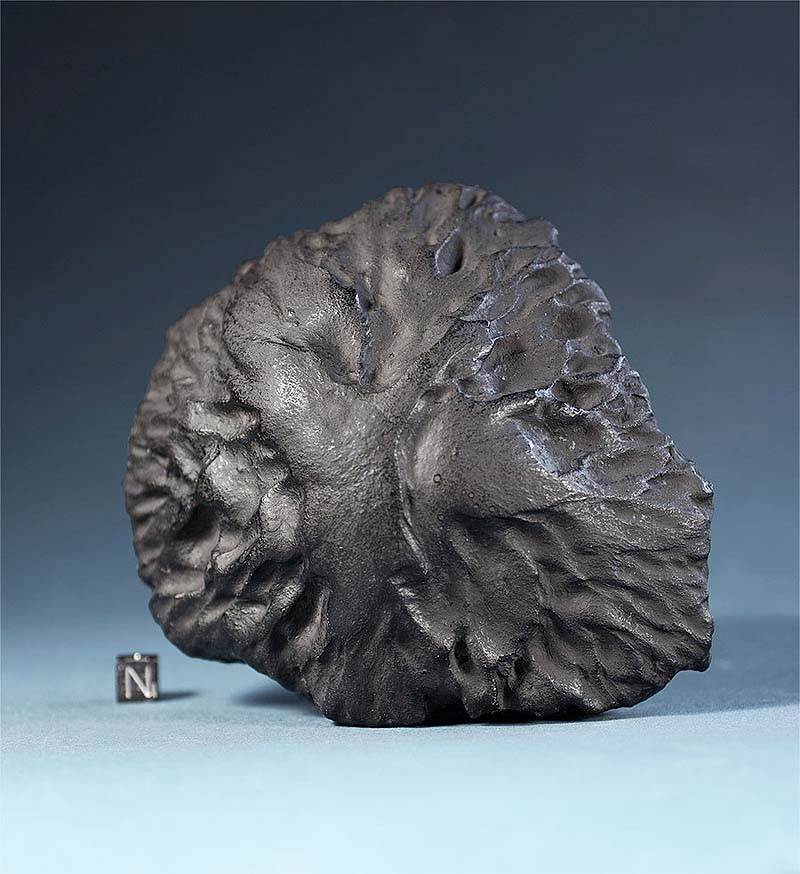
- A cast of the Middlesbrough meteorite
- Type: Chondrite
- Country: England
- Region: Middlesbrough
- Observed fall: Yes
- Fall date: 1881-03-14
- TKW: 1.5 kilograms (3.3 lb)
- Related media on Wikimedia Commons

The Middlesbrough meteorite fell in Middlesbrough, North Yorkshire, England on 14 March 1881.

The meteorite fell in the afternoon, hitting the ground around 3:35 pm. Although there were reports that sound generated as the object travelled through the Earth's atmosphere was heard in some areas of Yorkshire, the meteorite was unusual in that the sonic boom that would normally be associated with a meteorite entering the atmosphere was not heard by anyone who witnessed the fall, nor were there any reports of either a fireball or smoke trail.

The site of the impact was at the railway siding Pennymans's Siding, close to the site of the now demolished St. Luke's Hospital (now Roseberry Park). The exact location was reported as being 19 yards south of the signal cabin and on the west side of the railway lines; this gives co-ordinates of 54 deg 33 min 31 sec N and 1 deg 12 min 57 sec W. The impact was witnessed by workmen only yards away, who heard a "rushing or roaring" sound followed by thud, as the meteorite hit a nearby embankment, leaving a hole described by the astronomer Alexander Herschel as a "round vertical hole into which a man's arm might be thrust". The meteorite had penetrated to a depth of about 30 cm and was described as "new milk warm" to the touch by the workmen when they retrieved the object.

Herschel, who was then Professor of Physics and Experimental Sciences at Durham College of Physical Science in Newcastle upon Tyne, rushed to Middlesbrough on hearing the news to supervise the recovery and examination of the meteorite. By experimentation, replicating the conditions of the impact, he determined the speed of the object at the time was 412 feet per second (281 mph). This result was viewed as partial confirmation of a theory of the Italian astronomer Giovanni Schiaparelli that meteorites lost most of their cosmic velocity (the velocity they had before entering the Earth's atmosphere), due to air resistance at a high altitude in the atmosphere.

The Middlesbrough meteorite is classified as a chondrite. It is approximately 4.5 billion years old and was formed at the same time as the Earth and the Solar System. It is approximately 6 inches in diameter, weighs 3 pounds 8.75 ounces (approximately 1.5 kg) and has a crust of unusual thickness - it was recovered in one piece. A 3D scan of the object was made by NASA scientists in 2010.

Due to Middlesbrough not having a museum at the time of its fall to Earth, the meteorite was handed over to the Yorkshire Museum where it has been ever since. In March 2011, the 130th anniversary of its fall to Earth, it was lent to the town's Dorman Museum where it was put on display for several weeks.

== See also ==
- Glossary of meteoritics
