= Hirche =

Hirche is a German surname. Notable people with this surname include:

- Albrecht Hirche (born 1959), German theatre director
- Bernhard Hirche (born 1946), German architect
- Dagmar Hirche (born 1957), German entrepreneur
- Frank Hirche (born 1961), German politician
- Herbert Hirche (1910–2002), German architect and furniture and product designer
- Klaus Hirche (1939–2022), German ice hockey goalie
- Martin Hirche (1922–1986), German footballer
- Sandra Hirche (born 1974), German engineer
- Peter Hirche (1923–2003), German writer
- Walter Hirche (born 1941), German politician

== See also ==
- Hersch, Hersh, Herschel Hirsch, Hirche, Tsvi-Hirsh
