= Johann Alexander Herschel =

Telescope Craftsman and Musician

Johann Alexander Herschel (13 November 1745 – 16 March 1821) was a German musician and mechanical craftsman whose significant contribution to astronomy was fabricating high quality reflecting telescopes of the period with his siblings. He was the brother of Caroline Lucretia Herchel and Frederick William Herschel.

Alexander's contribution to musical performance in Bath, Somerset between 1770 and 1846 is his most notable achievement. Upon Alexander's departure from Bath in 1816, the Bath Chronicle stated that it was “the intention of the musical professors of Bath to pay a gratuitous tribute to the talents, character, age and virtues of Mr Herschel of this city, who has been their co-adjudicator in the orchestra on the violoncello for the last 45 years… “

Alexander's nephew, John Herschel, later had a son called Alexander Stewart Herschel who was an astronomer.

== Early life ==
Johann Alexander Herschel was born in the town of Hanover, Germany on 13 November 1745. One of ten children, his parents were Isaac Herschel (1707–1767), a self-taught oboist and bandmaster in the Hanoverian Guards, and his wife, Anna Ilse Moritzen (1710–1789).

Alexander left school in Hanover at the age of 12 years to become a musical apprentice to Heinrich Griesbach, the husband of Isaac's eldest daughter Sophia. He completed his apprenticeship in 1764 aged 18 years and returned to Hanover to board with city musicians and take up the position of ‘Stadt-Musicus’ or ‘Town Musician’ playing violin. When not busy with music, Caroline wrote of Alexander that “he often amused himself with making all sorts of things in pasteboard, or contriving how to make a twelve-hour Cuckoo clock go for a week…”

== Move to Bath ==
William Herschel travelled to the England in 1757. He relocated to Bath in 1766 to become the Octagon Chapel organist. Well settled in the music scene and society, he encouraged his siblings to join him. Alexander's older brother, Heinrich Anton Jacob Herschel visited first, returning in 1769. Alexander and Jacob travelled to Bath together in 1770 with a two-year leave of absence granted from Alexander’s musical appointments.

Alexander took up lodgings with his brother William and obtained a position with the band at the Orchard Street Theatre. Jacob returned to Hanover. Alexander was already an accomplished violinist and oboist and expanded his performances to clarinet and cello whilst in Bath.

Caroline joined Alexander and William in Bath in 1772 from Hanover.

== Marriage ==
In 1773 Alexander became engaged to Miss Cohlman who was a friend of Miss Bulman, an acquaintance from William’s previous lodgings in Bath. Alexander’s fiancé, Miss Cohlman, was seen with a former suspected lover and William made aware. On Alexander’s behalf, William persuaded the Lady to return the ring by which they were betrothed.

Later Miss Whiler, who was described as a ‘very handsome girl’, took an interest in Alexander. It was discovered she had more than one suitor and so the relationship with Alexander ended.

Alexander was introduced to Mrs Margaret Smith of Walcott Street, Bath. She was a widow. Alexander proposed and they were married in 1783. Margaret became ill and died in 1788. She is buried at Weston Church, Bath. The couple had no children.

== Making telescopes ==
By Caroline’s arrival in 1772, William was already preoccupied with a growing passion for the philosophical sciences, and he had a desire to observe the night skies. Alexander and Caroline were pressed into helping William with the construction of telescopes and their mountings and all manner of other items.

By 1774, the siblings’ lodgings in Bath resembled a workshop for the manufacture of fine astronomical instruments. Caroline describes Alexander “putting up a huge turning machine in a bedroom for turning patterns, grinding glasses & turning eye-pieces". Alexander is believed to have undertaken the turning of the eyepieces and screws on the lathe to produce the various Herschel telescopes constructed in Bath.

The siblings moved to 19 New King Street, Bath from 1777 for two years and returned to the house in March 1781. William discovered the planet Uranus for the garden on 13 March 1781 and later received patronage from George III. William and Caroline left Bath in 1782 to be close to Windsor Castle and the King, but Alexander remained in Bath at 19 New King Street to continue his musical career until the death of Margaret.

During subsequent summer seasons, Alexander would visit his brother and sister, in Datchet and Slough, to continue orders for existing models and building ever larger telescopes. Alexander also created a simple journeyman clock, for Caroline for astronomical observations. She called it the Monkey Clock and she used it when sweeping for comets to allow accurate recording of observation time.

Alexander continued crafting telescope parts as revealed in an 1801 letter from William to Caroline "I hope they will not want Alexander at Bath this good while, as I shall have much occasion for his help in fitting up these seven-feet telescopes".

The manufacturing and maintenance processes for the large 40-foot telescope increased the risk to Alexander’s career and health. Caroline once wrote to William's son John Herschel that "Your father and uncle Alexander too have had many hair-breadth escapes from being crushed by the taking in and out of the mirror". William and Alexander escaped serious injury previously in Bath when 538 pounds of molten speculum metal broke free of the horse dung mould used to cast mirror blanks.

== Later life ==
Following a "severe accident", Alexander returned to his hometown of Hanover in August 1816. The nature of the "severe accident" is not known. He took with him his own Gregorian telescope and two 9-inch mirrors. He died on 16 March 1821.

There are no portraits of Alexander, no scientific discoveries attributed to him, and no musical compositions bearing his name. His contributions to his siblings’ achievements are documented in their surviving writings.

== Sources ==
- Holden, Edward S. (1881). Sir William Herschel, his life and works . New York: Charles Scribner's Sons – via Wikisource.
- Winterburn, Emily (2017). The quiet revolution of Caroline Herschel: The lost heroine of astronomy. London: History Press. ISBN 978-0-7509-8067-8.
- Hoskin, Michael (2011). Discoverers of the Universe: William and Caroline Hersche. London: Princeton. ISBN 978-1-4008-3812-7.
