= Carl Christian Hirsch =

German politician (born 1985)

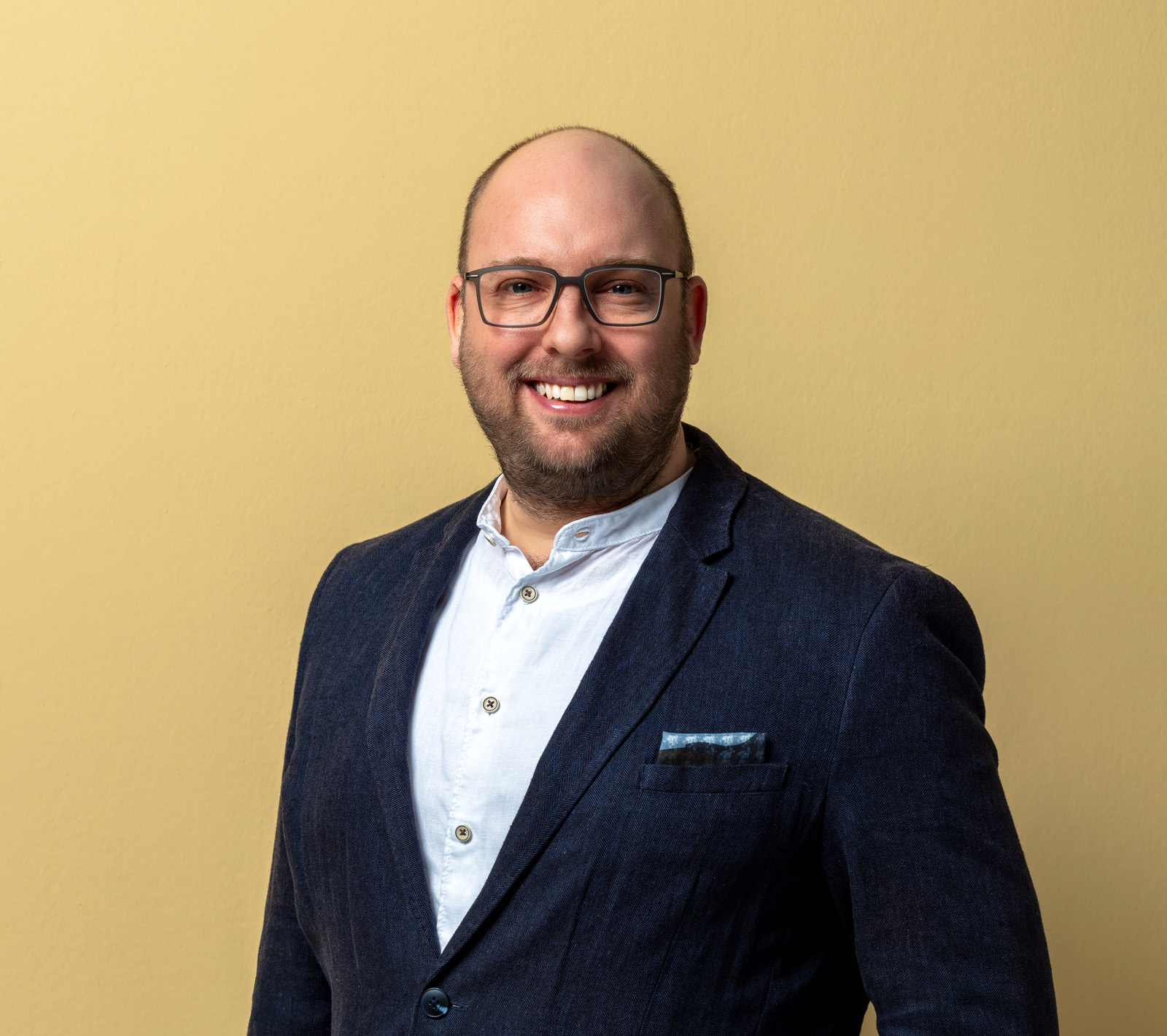
- Hirsch in 2025

Member of the Landtag of Baden-Württemberg
- Incumbent
- Assumed office 11 May 2026
- Constituency: Calw

Personal details
- Born: 5 September 1985 (age 40)
- Party: Christian Democratic Union

Carl Christian Hirsch (born 5 September 1985) is a German politician who was elected member of the Landtag of Baden-Württemberg in 2026. He has served as chairman of the Christian Democratic Union in Calw since 2025.
