= Peter Hirsch =

Peter Hirsch may refer to:

- Peter Hirsch (metallurgist) (1925–2025), British metallurgist
- Peter Hirsch (microbiologist) (born 1928), German microbiologist
- Peter Hirsch (conductor) (born 1956), German conductor
- Peter Hirsch (ice hockey) (born 1979), Danish former ice hockey goaltender
