= Hersh =

Hersh (Yiddish: הערש) is both a given name and surname, from the Yiddish language.

People with the name include:

== Given name ==
- Hersh Leib Sigheter (1829–1930), Hungarian Yiddish writer
- Hersh Wolch (1940–2017), Canadian lawyer
- Hersh Goldberg-Polin (2000–2024), American-Israeli hostage and terrorism victim

== Surname ==
- Arek Hersh, concentration camp survivor and writer (born 1928)
- Burton Hersh, American author, journalist and commentator
- Kristin Hersh, American singer-songwriter (born 1966)
- Mayer Hersh, Polish concentration camp survivor (1926–2016)
- Patricia Hersh, American mathematician (born 1973)
- Peter Hersh, American ophthalmologist
- Reuben Hersh, American mathematician (1927–2020)
- Seymour Hersh, American journalist (born 1937)

== See also ==
- Hersch, Hersh, Herschel, Hirsch, Hirche, Tsvi-Hirsh, Zebi Hirsch
- Hertz (name)
- Herzl
