= Herschel Catalogue =

Herschel Catalogue may refer to:

- Herschel Space Observatory catalogue of observations
- Catalogues published by William Herschel and Caroline Herschel
  - Catalogue of Nebulae and Clusters of Stars catalogued by William and Caroline Herschel
- Catalogues published by John Herschel
  - General Catalogue of Nebulae and Clusters of Stars, catalogued by John Herschel
- J.L.E. Dreyer's New General Catalogue and Index Catalogues, which expanded on the William, Caroline, John Herschel catalogues
- Herschel 400 Catalogue, a subset of the Herschels' catalogues for amateur astronomers
