= Jussieu =

Jussieu can refer to:

== People ==
- Adrien-Henri de Jussieu (1797–1853), French botanist, son of A. L. de Jussieu
- Antoine de Jussieu (1686–1758), French naturalist, uncle of A. L. de Jussieu
- Antoine Laurent de Jussieu (1748–1836), French botanist
- Bernard de Jussieu (1699–1777), French naturalist, uncle of A. L. de Jussieu
- See De Jussieu for additional family members

== Places ==
- Jussieu station, a Paris Metro station
- Jussieu Campus, a campus of the University of Paris, France
- Jussieu Peninsula, a peninsula in South Australia
