= Herschel Bay =

Bay in Nunavut, Canada

- Location within Nunavut
- Location: Nares Strait
- Coordinates: 78°36′N 74°43′W
- Ocean/sea sources: Arctic Ocean
- Basin countries: Canada
- Settlements: Uninhabited

Herschel Bay is an Arctic waterway in the Qikiqtaaluk Region, Nunavut, Canada. It is located in Nares Strait, west of Smith Sound. Ellesmere Island is to the east, while Cape Sabine on Pim Island is to the northeast.
