= Hersch =

Hersch is a German surname. Notable people with the surname include:

- Chris Hersch
- Fred Hersch, jazz pianist
- Jeanne Hersch, Swiss philosopher
- Joseph J. Hersch, American politician
- Liebmann Hersch, Bund leader and professor
- Michael Hersch
- Rainer Hersch, British musical comedian

== See also ==
- Hersch, Hersh, Herschel, Hirsch, Hirche, Tsvi-Hirsh
