= Hersh Leib Sigheter =

Hersh Leib Sigheter (1829–1930), pen name of Hersh (Hirsch) Leib Gottlieb גוטליב (or Gottlieb גאטטליעב) was a Hungarian Jew from today's Sighetu Marmaţiei, Romania (Hungarian: Sziget or Máramarossziget) who, even before the advent of what is generally considered to be professional Yiddish theater, wrote satirical Yiddish-language Purim plays on an annual basis and hired boys to play in them. Although often objected to by rabbis, these plays were popular, and were performed not only on Purim but for as much as a week afterwards in various locations.

First Sighet issue of Gottlieb's Hebrew weekly "Ha Shemes" (The Sun), 1878

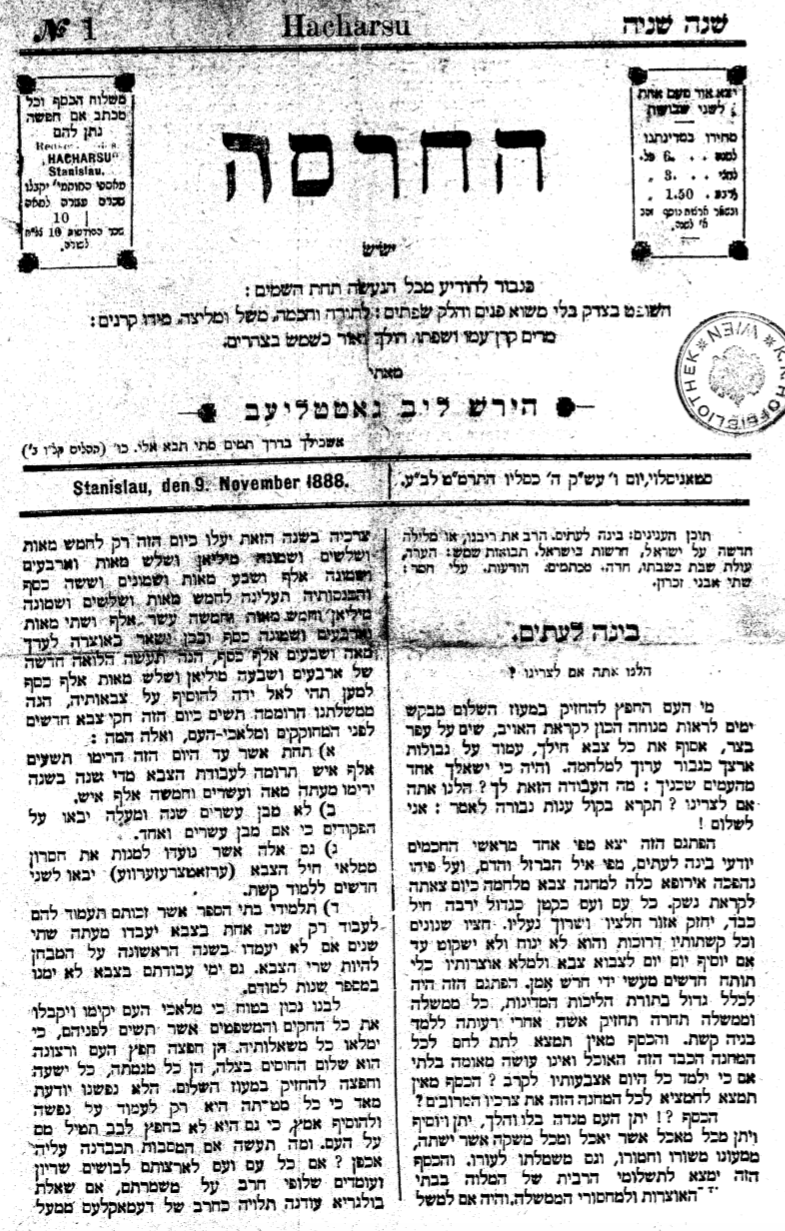
First Stanislawow/Kolomyia issue of Gottlieb's Yiddish weekly "Hacharsu" (The Sun), 1888

Under his own name, Gottlieb was also a famous translator, journalist and editor of newspapers in Sziget and Kolomyia (now in Ukraine). He founded what was effectively the first Hungarian weekly in Hebrew in 1878 in Sziget called "The Sun" (השמש). As of 1887, after having been expelled by Rabbi Chananyah Yom Tov Lipa Teitelbaum of Sziget, he continued to publish it, in Kolomyia, alternating between the two names HaShemesh (השמש) and HaCharsah to avoid an Austrian tax on weekly newspapers. He also published from 1893 to 1913 his "Jüdische Volkszeitung" (ייִדישע פאָלקסצײַטונג), Jewish People's Paper in Yiddish, from 1902 to 1914 his weeklies, Zion and Love of Zion (Ahavat Tzion אהבת ציון, together with Elijahu Blank) a bilingual Hungarian-Yiddish official Zionist newspaper, as well as his monthly "Die Wahrheit" (The Truth) in Hebrew in 1896. "Zion" is considered as the first Hungarian Zionist newspaper, which was sponsored by Theodor Herzl.
