= Jeanne Hersch =

Swiss philosopher (1910–2000)

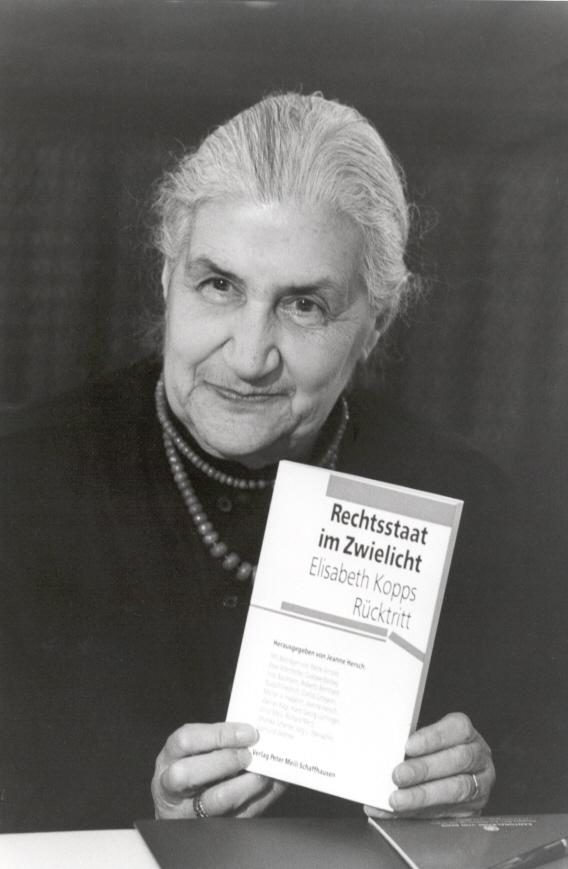
- Jeanne Hersch (1991)
- Born: 13 July 1910; Geneva, Switzerland
- Died: 5 June 2000 (aged 89); Geneva, Switzerland
- Family: Liebmann Hersch (father)
- Awards: Einstein Medal

Philosophical work
- Main interests: Freedom

Jeanne Hersch (13 July 1910 – 5 June 2000) was a Swiss philosopher of Polish-Jewish origin, whose works dealt with the concept of freedom. She was the daughter of Liebman Hersch.

== Education and career ==
Hersch was born in 1910 in Geneva, Switzerland. She later studied under the existentialist Karl Jaspers in Germany in the early 1930s. She taught French, Latin, and Philosophy in the International School of Geneva, the world's first international school, for 33 years (1933–1956).

She was secretary of the Central Committee of the Association of Friends of Republican Spain (Association des Amis de l'Espagne républicaine), which she founded with André Oltramarre on September 15, 1936, in Geneva, shortly after the start of the Spanish Civil War. The association had a dual purpose: providing informations and material assistance.

From 1942 to 1946, she participated in the doctoral colloquium of the philosopher Paul Häberlin, the predecessor of Karl Jaspers, at the University of Basel. Häberlin's Lucerna Foundation supported her doctoral thesis with a scholarship.

In 1956, she was appointed to a professorship at the University of Geneva, one of the first women to hold such a post at a Swiss university, holding the post until 1977. From 1966 to 1968, Hersch headed the philosophy division of UNESCO and was a member of its executive commission from 1970 to 1972.

In 1968 she edited Le droit d'être un homme, une anthologie mondiale de la liberté in French (translated in English in 1969 as Birthright of Man: A Selection of Texts and also in Greek as Το δικαίωμα να είσαι άνθρωπος), an anthology of writings on human rights, republished in French in 1984 and 1990.

In the 1970s, as Professor Emeritus at the University of Geneva, Jeanne Hersch attempted to prevent Jean Ziegler's appointment as full professor of sociology, questioning his intellectual rigor and denouncing his partisan stances. Following her death, the future United Nations Special Rapporteur on the Right to Food paid tribute to her by declaring:

Most professors are relics of the past, but not Jeanne Hersch, who was an extraordinary woman, particularly for her passion for debate. I have immense respect for her great intelligence. She was one of the greatest philosophers Switzerland has ever known and an exceptional professor, whose opinions I completely disagreed with.

— Vincent Monnet, Jeanne Hersch, l'exigence de la liberté, Campus, no 99, 2010, p. 33

In 1987, she received the Einstein Medal.

== Honors and awards ==
- 1936: Prix Amiel (Amiel Prize) from the University of Geneva for her first book L'illusion philosophique.
- 1941: Prix littéraire de la Guilde du Livre (Book Guild's Literary Prize) for her novel Temps alternés
- 1947: Prix Adolphe Neuman d'esthétique et de morale (Adolphe Neuman Prize of aesthetics and morals)
- 1970: Ida-Somazzi-Preis

== Bibliography ==
- Emmanuel Dufour-Kowalski Présence dans le Temps, L'Âge d'Homme Editions, Lausanne, 1999.

== See also ==
- Plainpalais
