= Sandra Hirche =

German control theorist (born 1974)

- Born: 1974 (age 51–52); Freiberg, Germany
- Education: Technische Universität Berlin; Technical University of Munich
- Occupations: Control theorist, engineer

Sandra Hirche (born 1974) is a German control theorist and engineer. She is Liesel Beckmann Distinguished Professor of electrical and computer engineering at the Technical University of Munich, where she holds the chair of information-oriented control. Her research focuses on human–robot interaction, haptic technology, telepresence, and the control engineering and systems theory needed to make those technologies work.

== Education and career ==
Hirche was born in 1974 in Freiberg. She became a student of aerospace engineering at Technische Universität Berlin, earning a diploma in 2002. She completed her doctorate (Dr.Ing.) at the Technical University of Munich in 2005.

After postdoctoral research at the Tokyo Institute of Technology and University of Tokyo, she joined the Technical University of Munich as an associate professor in 2008. She was named Liesel Beckmann Distinguished Professor and given the chair of information-oriented control in 2013.

== Recognition ==
Hirche was named an IEEE Fellow in 2020 "for contributions to human-machine interaction and networked control".
