= Baron de Hirsch Cemetery =

The name Baron de Hirsch Cemetery may refer to these Jewish cemeteries:

- Baron de Hirsch Cemetery (Halifax), in Halifax, Nova Scotia
- Baron de Hirsch Cemetery (Montreal), in Montreal, Quebec
- Baron Hirsch Cemetery, in Staten Island, New York
