= Hirsch Observatory =

Astronomical observatory in Troy, New York, USA

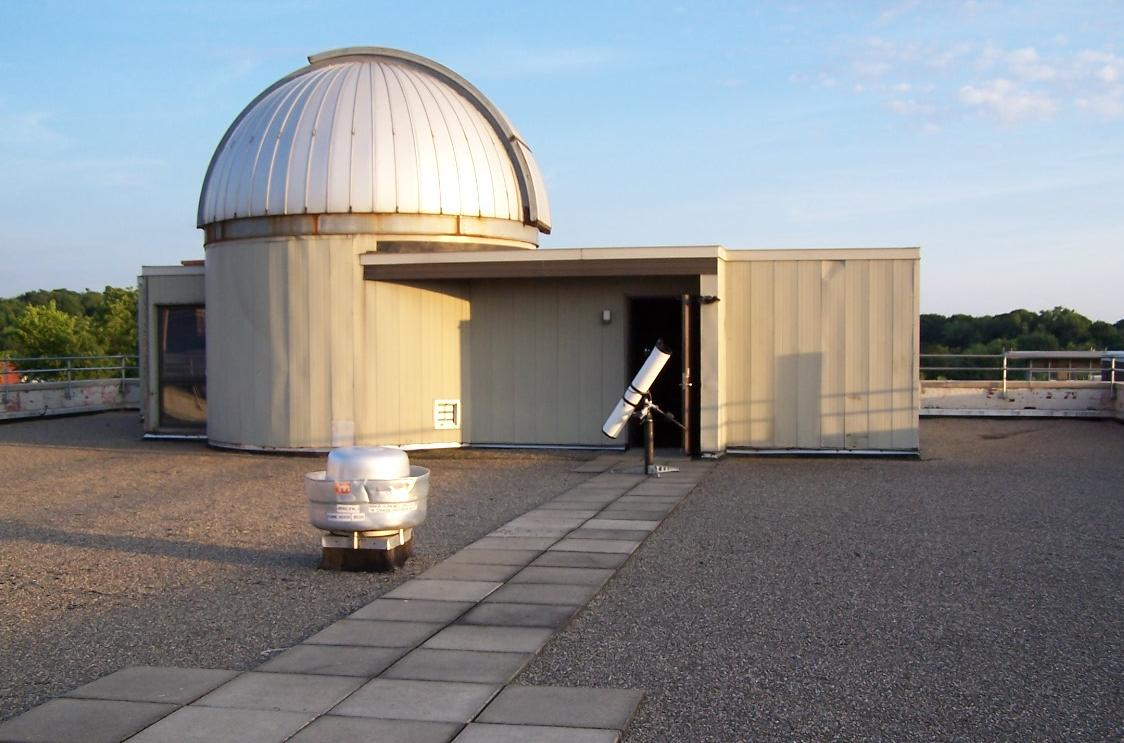
- Organization: Rensselaer Polytechnic Institute
- Location: Troy, New York (USA)
- Coordinates: 42.72845°N 73.68049°W

Telescopes
- Dome Telescope: 16" Cassegrain reflector
- 1942 Reflector: 12" Newtonian reflector
- Celestron GPS: 11" Schmidt-cassegrain

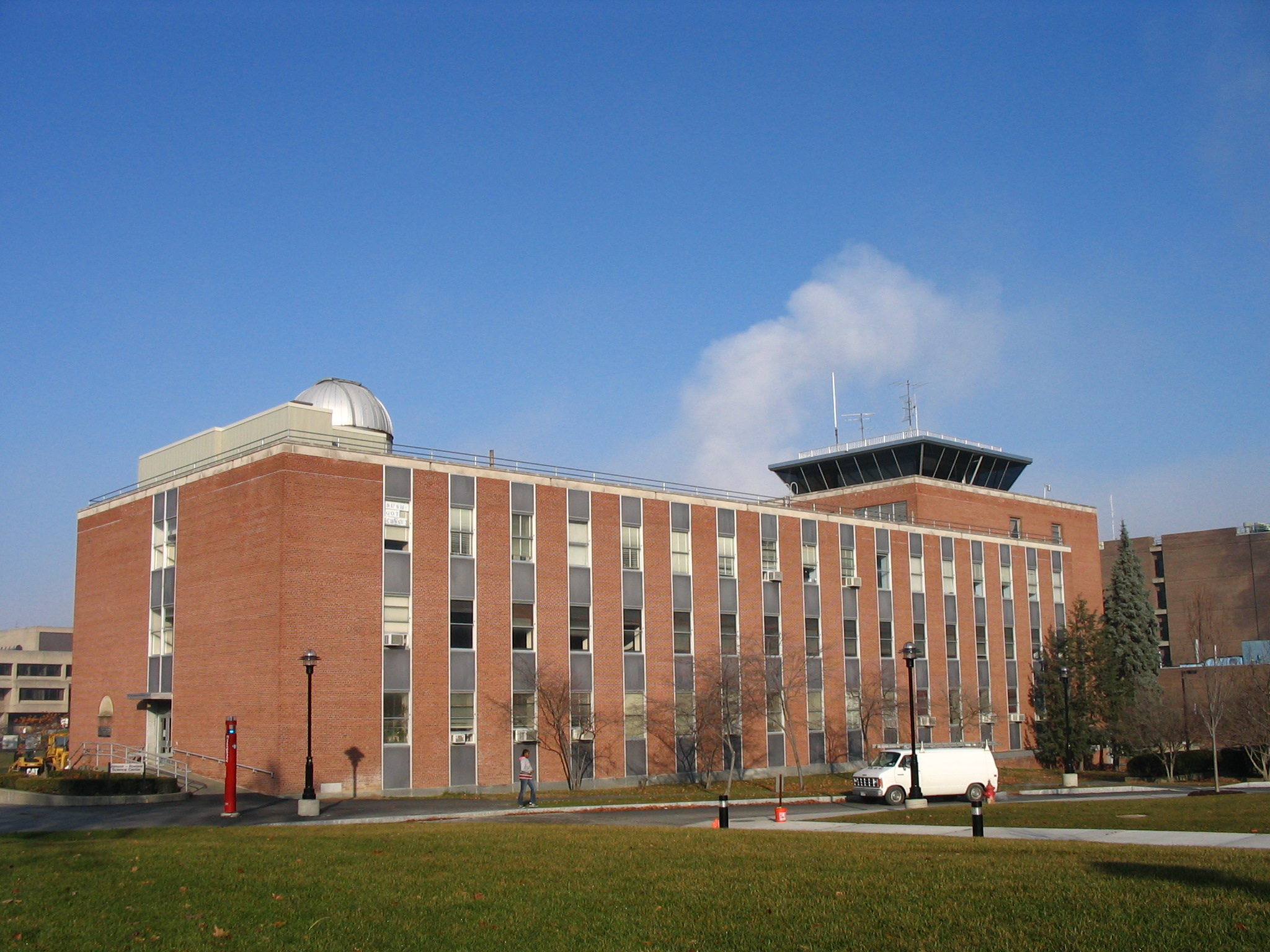
J.-R. Science Center

The Hirsch Observatory is an astronomical observatory at Rensselaer Polytechnic Institute (RPI) in Troy, New York. It is located on the roof of the Jonsson-Rowland Science Center (seen below) and is used by members of the Rensselaer Astrophysical Society as well as astronomy students in laboratory exercises. It is frequently opened to the community for public viewing sessions. The observatory's main dome contains a 16" Cassegrain Reflector, with a CCD camera and fully computerized controls. The observatory also owns a variety of smaller scopes and a SBIG Spectrograph. The spectrograph has been used to catalog bright solar spectrum as part of an effort to create an online digital database for astrophysical research. The current director of the observatory is Professor Heidi Newberg.

== History ==
The Hirsch observatory finished construction in 1942. It was built to house a 12" equatorial reflector designed and constructed at RPI. The telescope appeared on the cover of the October 1942 issue of Sky & Telescope magazine. Today the instrument is still operational and is stored on display in the lobby of the observatory. In 1980 the General Electric company donated the Boller and Chivens 16" Cassegrain telescope. The observatory was expanded and rededicated to celebrate the event. Then, in 1983 the observatory (reduced in size and scope) was moved to the roof of the Jonsson-Rowland Science Center to make room for construction of the Low Center for Industrial Innovation. The observatory was renamed the Hirsch Observatory, in honor of David Hirsch, Class of 1965 and Rensselaer Trustee, who donated money for the renovation. During 2006 there was a $70,000 refurbishment, in which the control system and electronics were revamped and the telescope optics collimated. The institute considered replacing the telescope with a new one, but decided not to, because the older scope is very robust and is much heavier and more stable than newer scopes.

== See also ==
- List of astronomical observatories
- Category:Astronomical observatories in New York (state)
