= Hereditary Genius =

1869 book by Francis Galton

Hereditary Genius: An Inquiry Into Its Laws and Consequences
- Title page for Hereditary Genius: An Inquiry Into Its Laws and Consequences (1892 edition)
- Author: Francis Galton
- Language: English
- Subject: Genius
- Publisher: Macmillan Publishers
- Publication date: 1869
- Publication place: United Kingdom
- Pages: 390

Hereditary Genius: An Inquiry Into Its Laws and Consequences is a book by Francis Galton about the genetic inheritance of intelligence. It was first published in 1869 by Macmillan Publishers. The first American edition was published by D. Appleton & Company in 1870. It was Galton's first major work written from a hereditarian perspective. It was later referred to as "the first serious study of the inheritance of intelligence" and as "the beginning of scientific interest in the topic of genius."

In the book, Galton claimed that the sons of men whom he considered "eminent" in a given profession were more likely to achieve such eminence themselves than if they were not closely related to eminent individuals. He interpreted this pattern as evidence for genetic transmission of human intelligence, without considering the environment. Nicholas W. Gillham stated "He (Galton) dismissed the obvious objection that an eminent father was more likely to find a suitable position for his son than one less fortunate. That is, environment might be important too."

Galton’s controversial theories of intelligence have been influential, shaping the perspective of numerous researchers.

== Contemporary reception ==
Alfred Russel Wallace wrote a favourable review of Hereditary Genius in Nature, concluding that the book "...will take rank as an important and valuable addition to the science of human nature." In general, contemporary scientists in Victorian England reviewed the book favourably, but reception among non-scientific Victorian readers was more mixed: religious commentators were much more critical of the book than were those of neither a scientific nor a religious background. Writing in the Journal of Anthropology, George Harris wrote, "We thank Mr. Galton for leading the way. We have canvassed his opinions freely; and, frequently as we differ from him, we must again assert our belief as to the value of his efforts, and the candid manner in which he has conducted his inquiries". Charles Darwin, a cousin of Galton, praised the book, writing in a letter to his cousin,

I have only read 50 pages of your book (to Judges), but I must exhale myself, else something will go wrong with my inside. I do not think I ever in all of my life read anything more interesting and original—and how well and clearly you put every point!"
