= David Hirsch (educator) =

German educator of the deaf

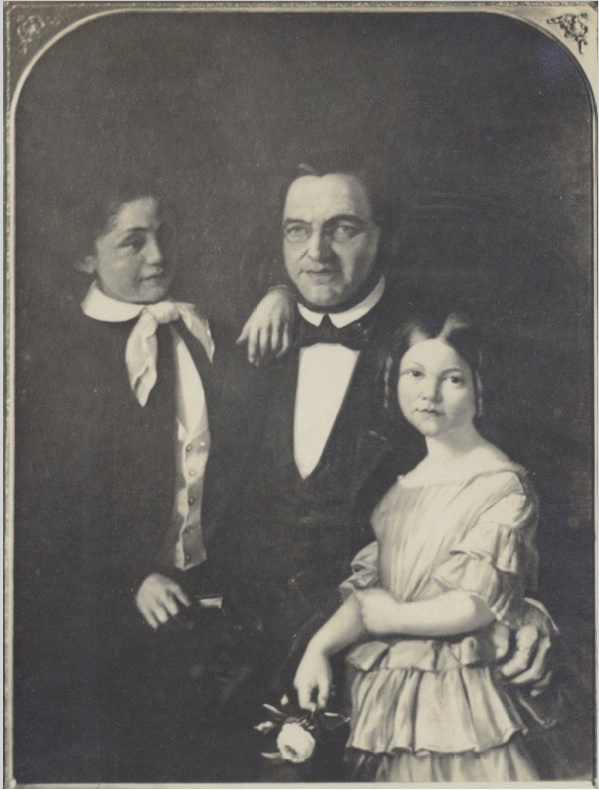
- David Hirsch with two students in 1853
- Born: 23 May 1813; Müntz, Rhenish Prussia
- Died: 2 February 1895 (aged 81); Rotterdam, The Netherlands

Academic work
- Notable students: William van Praagh

David Hirsch (23 May 1813 – 2 February 1895) was a German educator of the deaf.

== Biography ==
David Hirsch was born into a Jewish family in Müntz, Rhenish Prussia, in 1813. At a young age, he began teaching children in the local Jewish community. His success in teaching two deaf boys to speak and write attracted the attention of the Prussian government. He went on to study at the Heinicke Institute for Deaf-Mutes in Crefeld, and afterwards at a similar institute in Cologne.

At the age of 25, Hirsch was appointed director of a school for the deaf in Aachen. In 1847, he relocated to Rotterdam to work as a private tutor for the two deaf children of Machiel Polano. Over time, additional deaf children were placed under his instruction. On 23 May 1853 Hirsch founded the Rotterdamsche Inrichting voor Doofstommen-onderwijs, the first school in Holland dedicated to the oralist method for the education of the deaf. He managed this institution until 1887, when health issues forced him to step down from active leadership.

In recognition of his contributions to education, the Dutch government awarded Hirsch the Order of the Netherlands Lion, and France named him an Officier de l'Académie.

== Publications ==
- L'enseignement des sourds-muets d'après la méthode Allemande (Méthode-Amman) introduit en Belgique. Souvenirs d'une visite faite aux écoles des sourds-muets à Anvers, Brux., Gand et Bruges. Rotterdam. 1868.
- Lees- en taaloefeningen ten dienste van doofstomme kinderen, in de laagste klasse der lagere school. Bewerkt naar M. Hill's Elementar Lese- und Sprachbuch für Taubstumme. Rotterdam. 1864–1869.
- Wenken bij de opvoeding van doofstommen. Rotterdam. 1875.
- Le troisième congrès international pour l'amélioration du sort des sourds-muets, tenu à Bruxelles, considéré en rapport avec l'Institution des sourds-muets à Rotterdam. Rotterdam. 1884.
