= C. Herschel Schooley =

American newspaper editor (1900–1985)

C. Herschel Schooley (September 17, 1900 – September 1985) was a newspaper editor and public information director for the U.S. Naval Reserve and the Departments of Defense and Interior, a position in which he acted as a liaison officer between the agencies and the press, formulated press releases, corresponded with newspaper editors, and reviewed the credentials of reporters.

== Life ==
Schooley attended the University of Illinois from 1918 to 1922 and received his degree from the University of Missouri in 1925. He then became the city editor and news managing editor of the Mexico (Missouri) Ledger; a special area and staff correspondent for The Kansas City Star, St. Louis Globe-Democrat, St. Louis Post-Dispatch, and the Kansas City Journal-Post. From 1937 to 1942 he was the director of publicity and instructor of journalism at Hardin-Simmons University in Abilene, Texas, and a staff correspondent for the Oklahoma City Oklahoman and the Fort Worth Star-Telegram.

From 1946 to 1950 Schooley served as the Public Information Officer, U.S.N.R., Executive Office of the Secretary of the Navy; and at the same time also served as press officer for the Department of Defense under Secretaries James Forrestal, Louis Johnson, George C. Marshall, and Robert A. Lovett. In 1953 he received his M.A. degree from the University of Maryland, College Park and became the acting director of the Office of Public Information, U.S. Department of Defense, under Secretary Charles E. Wilson; and the director of the Office of Public Information, Department of Defense, for Secretaries Wilson and Neil H. McElroy. In 1958 he became the Director of Information for the Department of Interior under Secretaries Fred A. Seaton and Stewart Udall. He remained in this position until 1963 when he became press secretary to U.S. Senator John Tower of Texas.
