= Michael Hirsh =

Michael Hirsh may refer to:

- Michael Hirsh (producer) (born 1948), founder of the animation studio Nelvana
- Michael Hirsh (journalist), political reporter for Newsweek magazine
- Michael Hirsh (Australian producer), Australian film and TV producer at Working Dog Productions
