= Liebmann Hersch =

Swiss demographer and statistician

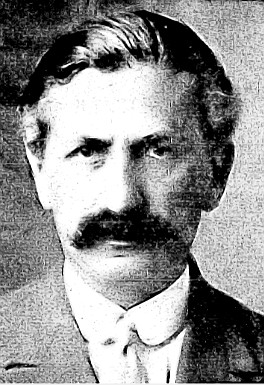
Hersch in 1938

Pesach Liebmann Hersch (25 May 1882 – 9 June 1955), also Liebman Hersh (ליבמאן הערש), was a professor of demography and statistics at the University of Geneva, and an intellectual of the Jewish Labor Bund, whose pioneering work on Jewish migration achieved international recognition in the period after the First World War.

== Biography ==
Liebmann Hersch was born in the small Lithuanian town of Pamūšis, in the district of Šiauliai, in what was then the Russian Empire. He was the son of Meyer Dovid Hersch (1858–1933) and Hannah-Dvorah Hersch (née Blumberg; 1860–1890). Liebmann's father was a maskil and a journalist who published articles in various Hebrew journals, including Ha-Maggid and Ha-Melitz. Liebmann was the oldest of six sons. Within a year or two of his birth his family moved to his father's hometown of Joniškis (Yanishok), where a younger brother was born, in 1884. Subsequently, they moved again, to Šiauliai (Shavel), his mother's hometown, where, between 1886 and 1890, four more sons were born. Liebmann's mother died in 1890, at the age of 30, seven weeks after giving birth to her youngest child.

In 1891 Meyer Dovid Hersch traveled to South Africa, where he worked as a correspondent for the Hebrew press in Eastern Europe. During their father's four-year sojourn in South Africa Liebmann and his brothers were in the care of a teacher in the town. Liebmann's father returned to Šiauliai in 1895, and remarried the same year. He and his second wife, Ita Melamed Hersch (1871–1958), moved with their family to Warsaw, where Liebmann attended high school, and participated in Zionist youth activities.

Liebmann Hersch studied mathematics at the University of Warsaw. Because of his involvement in anti-Czarist political activity Hersch was eventually forced to flee Warsaw. He moved to Geneva in 1904. In 1905 he joined the Jewish socialist party—the General Union of Jewish Workers in Lithuania, Poland and Russia (Yiddish: Algemeyner Yidisher Arbeter Bund), also known as the Jewish Labor Bund, or simply the Bund—that had been founded in 1897. Influenced by the debates within the Bund about the economic and political future of the Jews in Eastern Europe, Hersch pursued research on the causes and characteristics of Jewish emigration.

At the University of Geneva, Liebmann Hersch studied sociology. He became an instructor in the department of statistics and demography in 1909, and went on to complete his dissertation, which was published in French in 1913 as Le Juif errant d'aujourd'hui (The wandering Jew today). A revised edition was published the following year in Yiddish as Di yudishe emigratsie (Jewish emigration). He subsequently spent his entire professional career in Geneva.

In connection with his Bundist activities, Hersch published articles on political and social issues in the Yiddish, Polish and Russian press, with a focus on emigration and the problems of Jewish nationalism.

In the period following World War I, by which time he was a professor at the University of Geneva, Hersch devoted much work to the situation of the Jews in Europe at that time. In 1927 he published a three-part study in the Yiddish-language journal Di Tsukunft that amounted to a critique of Zionism from a statistical and demographic standpoint. On the basis of that study he wrote his book Immigration to and Emigration from Palestine, published in Warsaw in Yiddish in 1928, and subsequently translated into French. In 1931 Hersch's article "International Migration of the Jews," which became a classic work on the topic, appeared in the collection International Migrations (volume 2), edited by Walter Willcox and Imre Ferenczi, and published by the National Bureau of Economic Research in New York.

In the 1930s Hersch's research mainly comprised statistical and quantitative analyses of the conditions under which Jews lived. In 1937 he published a study in Yiddish comparing Jewish and non-Jewish crime in Poland, which appeared in Vilna in 1937.

During World War II, Hersch was active on behalf of Jews in Nazi-occupied countries, and those who had taken refuge in Switzerland, and was a representative on the American Jewish Labor Committee. He was also a member of the executive council of the World ORT.

Hersch visited Palestine for the first time in 1947 as a participant in the World Congress for Jewish Studies in Jerusalem. He described it as a "jewel on a volcano." He then became much less opposed to Zionism than the official Bund position and advocated support for the Yishuv.

In 1954 Hersch was elected as chair of the World Population Conference of the United Nations (the fourth international conference for demography and statistics), held in Rome. At that time he was also president of the International Union for the Scientific Study of Population.

== Personal life ==
Liebmann Hersch was married to Liba Hersch (née Lichtenbaum), of Warsaw. They had three children, Jeanne (b. 1910), Irène (b. 1917) and Joseph (b. 1925). Their daughter Jeanne Hersch became a noted philosopher at the University of Geneva.
