= Alexander Stewart Herschel =

British astronomer 1836–1907

- Born: 5 February 1836; Feldhausen, near Cape Town, British Cape Colony (today South Africa)
- Died: 18 June 1907 (aged 71); Slough, England
- Citizenship: United Kingdom
- Education: Trinity College, Cambridge
- Spouse: None
- Scientific career
- Fields: astronomy, physics
- Workplaces: Royal School of Mines, Andersonian University, University of Durham

Alexander Stewart Herschel, DCL, FRS (5 February 1836 – 18 June 1907) was a British astronomer. He was the son of John Herschel and the grandson of William Herschel. He carried out pioneering work in meteor spectroscopy, and worked on identifying comets as the source of meteor showers. The Herschel graph, the smallest non-Hamiltonian polyhedral graph, is named after him due to his pioneering work on William Rowan Hamilton's Icosian game.

== Early life and education ==
The second son and fifth child of Sir John and Lady Margaret Herschel's twelve children, Herschel was born on 5 February 1836 at Feldhausen, near Cape Town, South Africa, where they had been since 1834 for John's astronomical work. His older brother was Sir William Herschel, 2nd Baronet, and his younger brother John Herschel the Younger was born in 1837. The family left for England on 11 March 1838, returning a few weeks before Queen Victoria's coronation.

After some private education, Alexander was sent to Clapham Grammar School in London in 1851, of which Charles Pritchard, who would later become Savilian Professor of Astronomy, was headmaster. In 1855, he proceeded to Trinity College, Cambridge, where he graduated B.A. as twentieth wrangler in 1859, proceeding M.A. in 1877. While an undergraduate he helped James Clerk Maxwell with his illustrations of the mechanics of rotation by means of the apparatus known as "the devil on two sticks." From Cambridge Herschel passed in 1861 to the Royal School of Mines in London, and began the observation of meteors which he continued to the end of his life. He early wrote, chiefly on meteorological subjects, papers for the British Meteorological Society, and between 1863 and 1867, he contributed many articles to the Intellectual Observer.

== Career ==
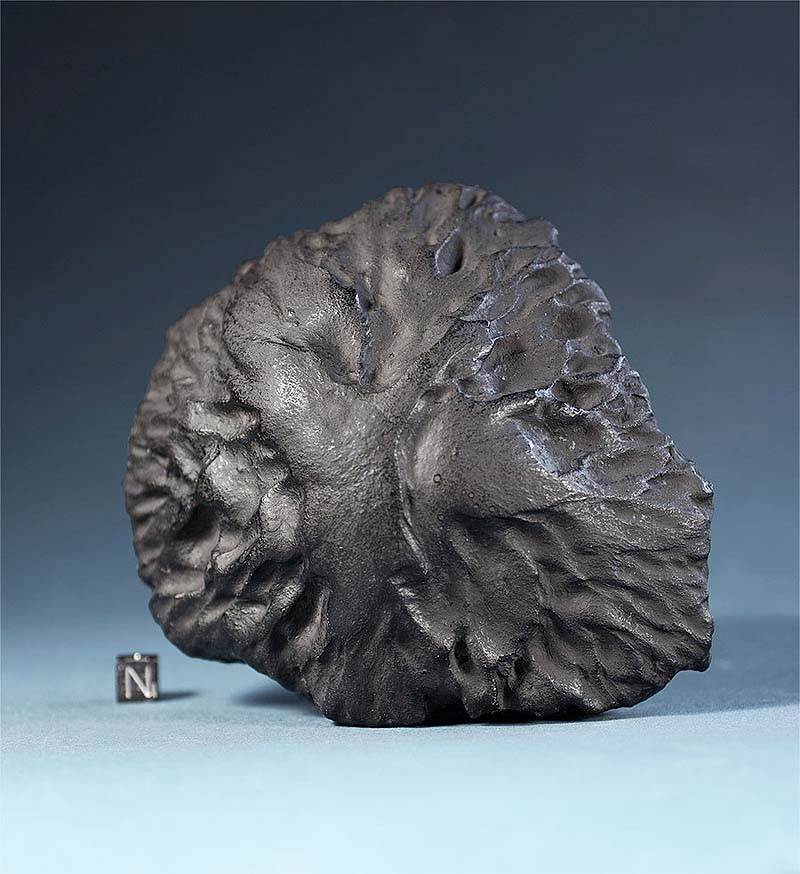
Cast of the Middlesbrough meteorite which was identified by Herschel

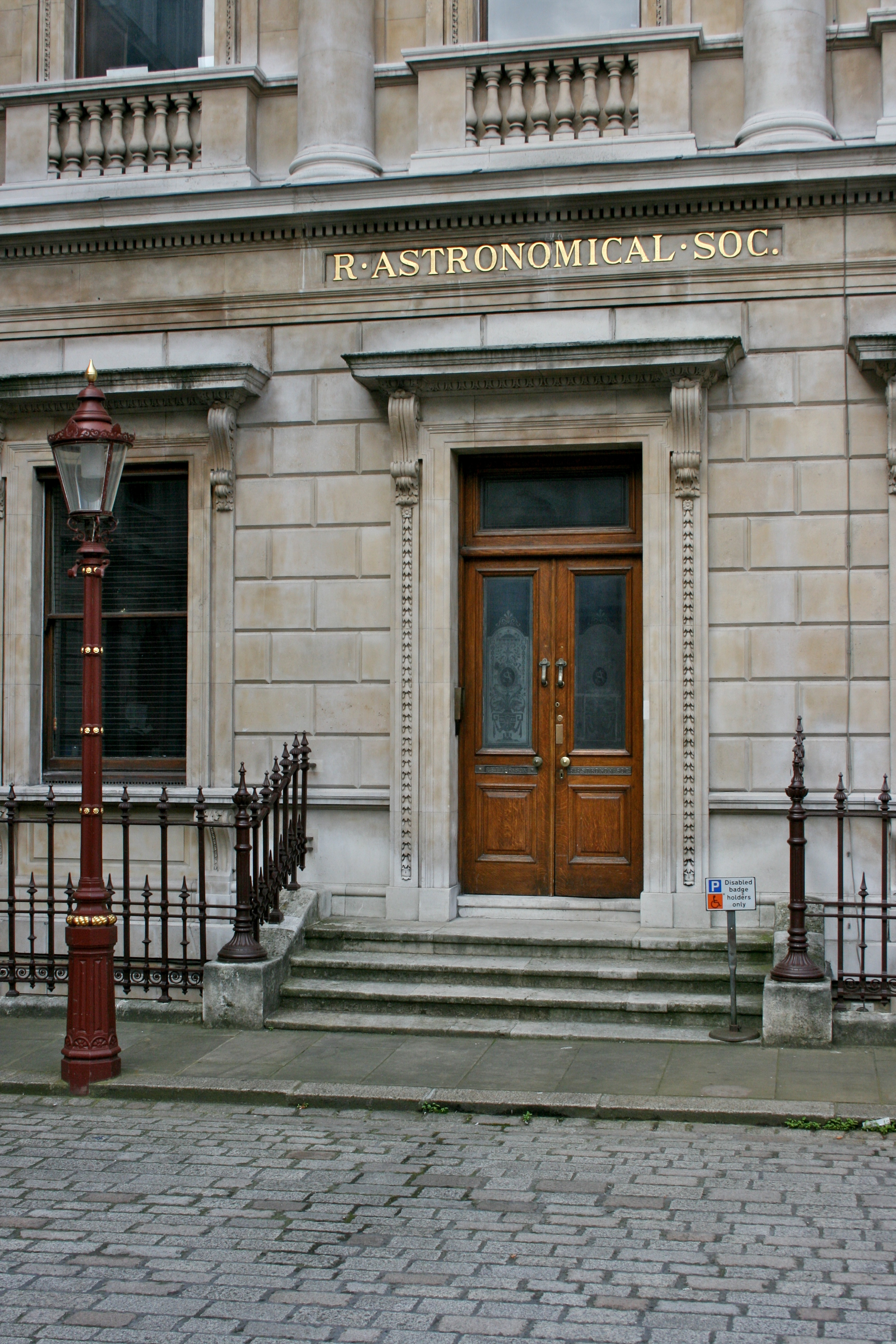
The entrance to the Royal Astronomical Society of which he was a Fellow

From 1866 to 1871, Herschel was lecturer on natural philosophy, and professor of mechanical and experimental physics in the Andersonian University of Glasgow. From 1871 to 1886, he was the first professor of physics and experimental philosophy in the University of Durham College of Science, Newcastle upon Tyne. At the Durham College, Herschel provided, chiefly by his personal exertions, apparatuses for the newly installed laboratory, some being made by his own hands. When the college migrated as Armstrong College to new buildings, the new Herschel Physical Laboratory was named after him.

Herschel made accurate records of his observations of shooting stars in a long series of manuscript notebooks. He also accomplished important work in the summation, reduction, and discussion of the results of other observers with whom he corresponded in all parts of the world. With Robert P. Greg he formed extensive catalogues of the radiant points of meteor streams, the more important of these being published in the Reports of the British Association for 1868, 1872, and 1874. A table of the radiant points of comets computed by Herschel alone is in the Report for 1875. He was reporter to the committee of the British Association on the 'observations of luminous meteors,' and from 1862 to 1881 drew up annually complete reports of the large meteors observed, and of the progress of meteoric science. For the British Association (1874–81) he prepared reports of a committee, consisting of himself, his colleague at Newcastle, George A. Lebour, and John T. Dunn, which was formed to determine the thermal conductivities of certain rocks. For the Monthly Notices of the Royal Astronomical Society, he prepared the annual reports on meteoric astronomy each February from 1872 to 1880 and contributed many other important papers to the Notices. In a June 1872 paper, he showed the connection between meteors (the Andromedids) and comets (Biela's Comet), and he predicted the shower which recurred on 27 November of that year. Herschel acquired great precision in noting the paths of meteors among the stars. From his determination of the radiant point of the November Leonids, Giovanni Schiaparelli deduced the identity of their orbit with that of Tempel's Comet of 1866, 55P/Tempel–Tuttle. In 1864 and 1873 he observed the bright green colour of two respective Geminid meteors.

Besides meteoric astronomy, Herschel was interested in many branches of physical science, and became a member of the Physical Society of London in 1889 and of the Society of Arts in 1892. He contributed frequently to Nature, an article on "The Matter of Space" in 1883 being specially noteworthy. He worked much at photography, and in 1893 the Amateur Photographic Association presented an enlarged carbon print portrait of Alexander Herschel to the South Kensington Museum for the British Museum Portrait Gallery.

Herschel became fellow of the Royal Astronomical Society in 1867, and on 12 June 1884 was elected Fellow of the Royal Society, an honour already conferred on his grandfather, his father, and his younger brother John. In 1886, he gave up his professorship, and was made Doctor of Civil Law of Durham University. In 1888, with other members of his family, he reoccupied the house in Slough, now called Observatory House, where his grandfather, Sir William Herschel, had lived. Here he resided until his death, absorbed in study, but late in life he made a journey to Spain to observe the solar eclipse of 1905.

== Death ==
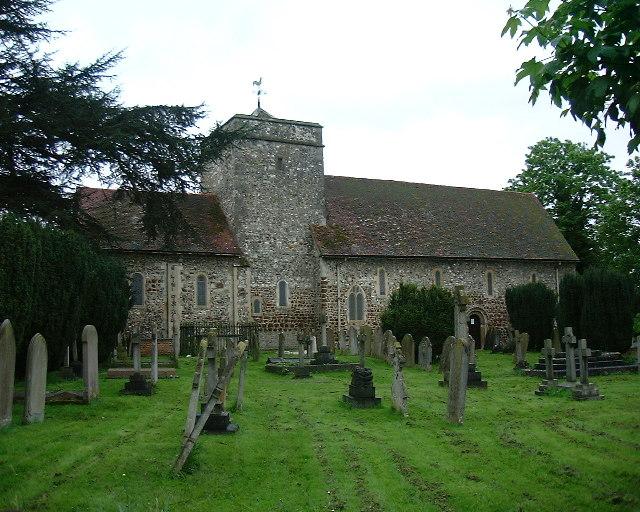
The cemetery of the Church of St Laurence where Alexander and his grandfather are buried

He died unmarried at Observatory House on 18 June 1907 and was buried in Church of St Laurence, Upton-cum-Chalvey, in the chancel of which his grandfather lies.

== Bibliography ==
- This article incorporates text from a publication now in the public domain: Hollis, Henry Park (1912). "Herschel, Alexander Stewart". In Lee, Sidney (ed.). Dictionary of National Biography (2nd supplement). London: Smith, Elder & Co. pp. 257–258.
- Airy, W.; Lebour, W. A.; Denning, W. F.; Sherer, John W. (July 1907). "Obituary: Alexander Stewart Herschel". The Observatory. 30 (385): 278. Bibcode:1907Obs....30..278.
- Beech, Martin (2007). "Herschel, Alexander Stewart". In Hockey, Thomas (ed.). Biographical Encyclopedia of Astronomers. Springer Publishing. ISBN 978-0-387-30400-7.
- Cavin, Jerry D. (2011). "Alexander Herschel". The Amateur Astronomer's Guide to the Deep-Sky Catalogs. Springer Publishing. ISBN 978-1-4614-0656-3.
- Crowe, Michael J. (1997). "Herschel, Alexander Stewart (1836–1907)". In Lankford, John (ed.). History of Astronomy: An Encyclopedia. Taylor & Francis. ISBN 978-0-8153-0322-0.
- Debus, Allen G. (1968). World Who's who in Science: A Biographical Dictionary of Notable Scientists from Antiquity to the Present. Marquis-Who's Who. ISBN 978-0-8379-1001-7.
- Denning, William Frederick (27 June 1907). "Prof. A. S. Herschel, F.R.S". Science. 76 (202–203): 202–203. Bibcode:1907Natur..76..202D. doi:10.1038/076202a0. (subscription required)
- Millman, Peter M. (1980a). "The Herschel Dynasty – Part II: John Herschel". Journal of the Royal Astronomical Society of Canada. 74 (5): 203. Bibcode:1980JRASC..74..203M.
- Millman, Peter M. (1980b). "The Herschel Dynasty – Part III: Alexander Stewart Herschel". Journal of the Royal Astronomical Society of Canada. 74 (5): 279. Bibcode:1980JRASC..74..279M.
- "Obituary Notices: Fellows: Herschel, Alexander Stewart". Monthly Notices of the Royal Astronomical Society. 68 (542). London: Priestley and Weale: 231. 1908. Bibcode:1908MNRAS..68S.231.. doi:10.1093/mnras/68.4.231a.
- H. P. Hollis; rev. A. J. Meadows. "Herschel, Alexander Stewart (1836–1907)". Oxford Dictionary of National Biography (online ed.). Oxford University Press. doi:10.1093/ref:odnb/33839. (Subscription, Wikipedia Library access or UK public library membership required.)
