= John Herschel the Younger =

English engineer and astronomer (1837–1921)

Colonel John Herschel FRS FRAS
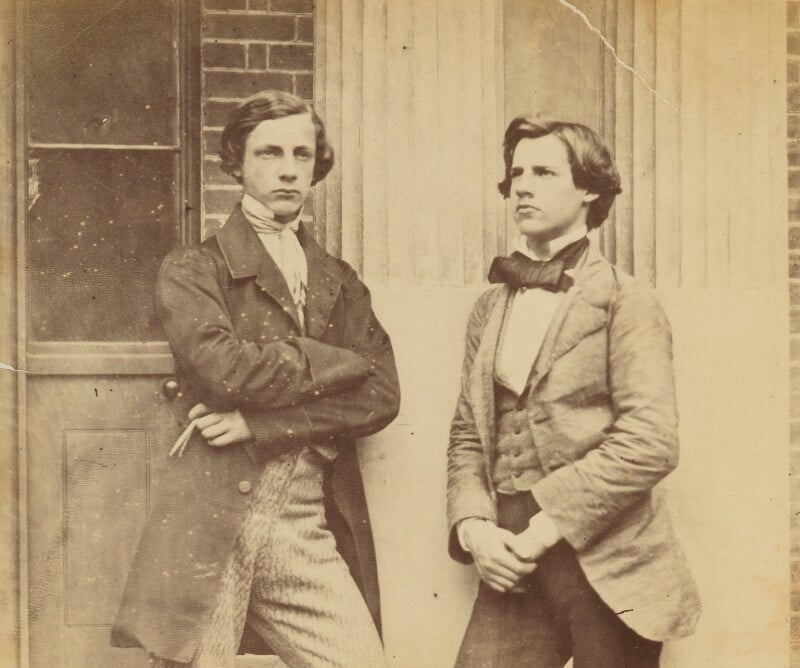
- Herschel (left) with brother William, late 1850s
- Born: 29 October 1837; Claremont, Cape Town, Cape Colony
- Died: 31 May 1921 (aged 83)
- Spouse: Mary Cornwallis Lipscomb (m. 1867; died 1876)
- Military career
- Allegiance: United Kingdom
- Branch: Bengal Army; British Army
- Service years: 1856–1886
- Rank: Colonel
- Units: Bengal Engineers; Royal Engineers

John Herschel (29 October 1837 – 31 May 1921) was an English military engineer, surveyor and astronomer. He was the son of Sir John Herschel, 1st Baronet, and grandson of William Herschel.

== Biography ==
Herschel was born in Claremont, a suburb of Cape Town in the British Cape Colony of South Africa, the third son and the sixth child (of twelve) of Sir John Herschel and his wife Margaret Brodie (née Stewart). His family had travelled to the Cape in late 1833, so that his father could work on an astronomical survey of the southern skies. The family returned to England in 1838, where Herschel was later educated at Clapham Grammar School, and then attended the East India Company Military Seminary at Addiscombe.

Herschel entered the East India Company's service as a cadet to serve in the Bengal Engineers, and on 26 December 1856 was made a local and temporary ensign while under the command of Colonel Sandham, at the Royal Engineer Establishment at Chatham, for instruction in the art of sapping and mining. He was promoted to the local and temporary rank of lieutenant, while still studying at Chatham on 13 August 1858. However, shortly afterwards, on 27 August 1858, with the end of company rule in India, and the assumption of direct administration by the British government, Herschel's regiment was transferred en masse to the Royal Engineers.

Herschel travelled out to India, where he joined the Great Trigonometrical Survey and spent the years 1864–1872 engaged in a survey of various parts of Southern India. He married Mary Cornwallis Power (née Lipscomb) in 1867, the daughter of the Reverend F. Lipscomb, Rector of Welbury, Yorkshire, and the widow of D. Power, QC. He was promoted to second captain on 10 November 1869.

Apart from his surveying work he also carried out numerous independent astronomical observations. He made spectroscopic observations of the corona of the sun during the total solar eclipse of 18 August 1868, and studied the Carina Nebula in November, being one of the first to observe the sudden brightening of Eta Carinae. He also conducted a series of experiments with the Cavendish pendulum to calculate the density of the Earth.

John Herschel was married to Mary Cornwallis Herschel, whose memoir of John's great aunt Caroline Herschel was published in 1876.

Herschel returned to England on furlough in late 1873, where he worked on collecting his late father's letters into mid-1874. He was promoted to major on 10 March 1876.

In April 1882 he arrived in the United States, where he spent a year working with Charles Sanders Peirce on the construction of pendulums to conduct gravimetric and geodesic surveys on behalf of the United States Coast and Geodetic Survey.

Herschel eventually became the Deputy Superintendent of Trigonometrical Survey, before eventually retiring from the army on 10 March 1886 as a major and brevet lieutenant-colonel, with the honorary rank of colonel.

He was elected a fellow of the Royal Society in 1871 and of the Royal Astronomical Society in 1872. Herschel died, aged 83, in 1921.
