= Sir William Herschel, 2nd Baronet =

British forensic scientist (1833–1917)

Sir William Herschel Bt
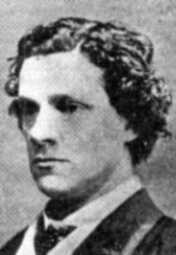
- Born: 9 January 1833; Slough, England
- Died: 24 October 1917 (aged 84)
- Burial place: St Laurence Church Yard, Hawkhurst, Kent, England
- Scientific career
- Fields: Fingerprints, forensics

Sir William James Herschel, 2nd Baronet (9 January 1833 – 24 October 1917) was a British ICS officer in India who used fingerprints for identification on contracts.

== Personal life ==
He was born in Slough in Buckinghamshire (now Berkshire), the third child (of twelve) and the eldest son (of three) of the astronomer, John Herschel. His younger brothers were Alexander and John.

On 19 May 1864 he married (Anne) Emma Haldane, youngest daughter of Alfred Hardcastle of Hatcham House, Surrey. She died at the birth of their second son, having borne him 4 children:

- Margaret Eliza Emma Herschel (1865–1880). She had a brain tumor early on.
- Emma Dorothea Herschel (1867–1954)
- Reverend Sir John Charles William Herschel, 3rd Baronet (1869–1950)
- Arthur Edward Hardcastle Herschel (1873–1924)

He lived at Warfield in Berkshire and at Littlemore in Oxfordshire. Upon his death the baronetcy passed to his son.

== Fingerprinting ==
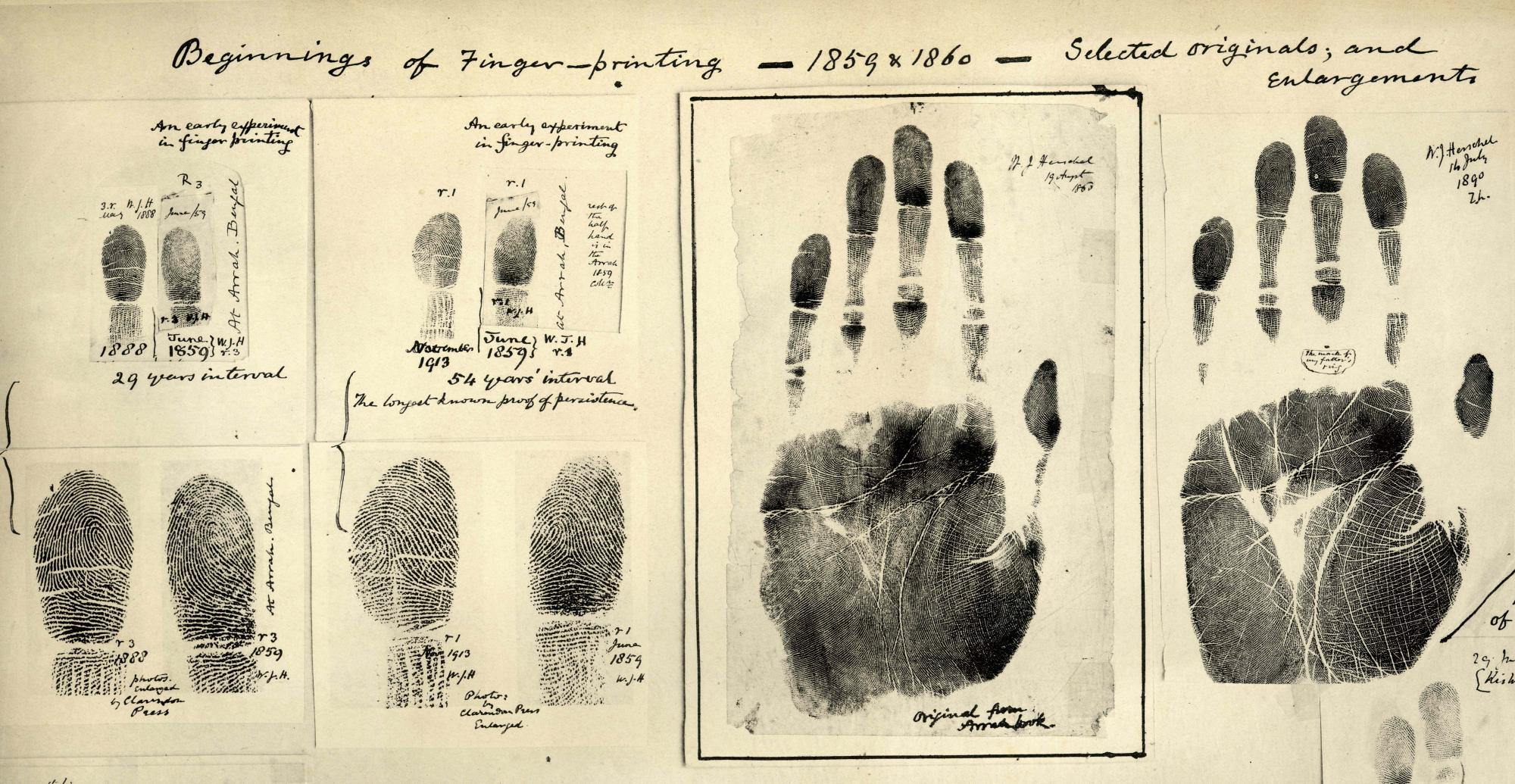
Fingerprints taken by Herschel 1859/60

Herschel is credited with being the first European to note the value of fingerprints for identification. He recognized that fingerprints were unique and permanent. Herschel documented his own fingerprints over his lifetime to prove permanence. He was also credited with being the first person to use fingerprints in a practical manner. As early as 1858, working as a British officer for the Indian Civil Service at Jangipur in the Bengal region of India, he started putting fingerprints on contracts.

He worked from his late teens constantly until two years before his death.

== Arms ==
Coat of arms of Sir William Herschel, 2nd Baronet
Crest A demi-terrestrial sphere Proper thereon an eagle wings elevated Or. Escutcheon Argent on a mount Vert a representation of the forty feet reflecting telescope with its apparatus Proper a chief Azure thereon the astronomical symbol of Uranus or the Georgium Sidus irradiated Or. Motto Coelis Exploratis

== Notes ==
Baronetage of the United Kingdom
Preceded by John Herschel	Baronet (of Slough); 1871–1917	Succeeded by John Herschel
