= Tsvi-Hirsh =

Tsvi Hirsh, Tzvi Hirsh, Zebi Hirsh, Zvi Hirsh, etc. (including "Hirsh" spelled as Hirsch or Hersh, inversions such as Hirsh Tsvi, and hyphenated forms) (Yiddish: צבי־הירש) is a bilingual pleonasmic Jewish name doublet, literally "deer-deer", traceable back to the Hebrew word צבי tsvi "deer" and the Middle High German word hirz "deer".

Notable people with the name include:

- Zvi Hirsch Gregor Belkovsky (1865–1948), jurist, economist, and Zionist activist
- Tsvi Hirsh Bonhardt (c. 1745–1810), Polish rabbi
- Tzvi Hersh Mordechai Bonhardt (1826–1866), Polish rabbi
- Zvi Hirsh Broide, Lithuanian rabbi
- Tzvi Hirsh Eichenstein (1763–1831), Galician rabbi
- Tzvi Hirsch Ferber (1879–1966), Lithuanian-British rabbi
- Tzvi Hirsh Filipowski (1816–1872), Lithuanian-British Hebraist and actuary
- Tzvi Hersh Friedlander, American rabbi
- Zvi Hirsch Grodzinsky (1857–1947), American rabbi
- Zebi Hirsch Kaidanover (c. 1650–1712), Lithuanian-born rabbi
- Zvi Hirsch Kalischer (1785–1874), German rabbi and proto-Zionist
- Zvi Hirsch Masliansky, Belarusian-born American rabbi, lecturer and Zionist
- Samuel Zvi Hirsh "Henryk" Peltyn or Samuel Peltyn
- Zvi Hirsh Yosef HaKohen Resnick or Zvi Yosef Resnick (1841–1912), Russian rabbi
- Zebi Hirsch Scherschewski (1840–1909), Russian Hebrew-language writer
- Zebi Hirsch Sundeles, Polish Jewish scholar
- Tzvi Hersh Weinreb (born 1940), American rabbi
- Tzvi Hirsh of Zidichov (1763–1831), Hasidic rabbi

== See also ==
- Tsvi, Tsvia, Tzvi, Tzvia, Zevi, Zvi, Tzvika/Zvika, Tsvi-Hirsh, Zebi Hirsch, Ben-Zvi, David-Zvi
- Hersch, Hersh, Herschel, Hirsch, Hirche, Tsvi-Hirsh, Zebi Hirsch
