= Zvi =

Zvi (Hebrew: צְבִי and צבי, Tzvi, Ṣvi, "gazelle") is a Jewish masculine given name. It is sometimes paired with Hirsch, the German and Yiddish word for "deer", in a bilingual pleonasm.

Notable people with this name include:

- Zvi Aharoni (1921–2012), Israeli Mossad agent
- Zvi Arad (1942–2018), Israeli mathematician, acting president of Bar-Ilan University, president of Netanya Academic College
- Zvi Hirsch Gregor Belkovsky (1865–1948), jurist, economist, and Zionist activist
- Zvi Ben-Avraham (born 1941), Israeli geophysicist
- Zvi Bern (born 1960), American physicist
- Zvi Bodie (born 1943), American academic
- Zvi Bornstein (1926–2024), Slovak antifascist fighter
- Zvi Brenner (1915–1999), Zionist leader
- Zvi Hirsch Chajes (1805–1855), Orthodox Polish rabbi
- Zvi Chalamish, Israeli financier
- Zvi Dror (1926–2025), Israeli historian
- Zvi Elpeleg (1926–2015), Israeli academic
- Zvi Galil (born 1947), Israeli computer scientist, mathematician, and President of Tel Aviv University
- Zvika Greengold (born 1952), Israeli officer during the Yom Kippur War, awarded the Medal of Valor
- Zvi Griliches (1930–1999), Jewish-American economist
- Zvi Hirsch Grodzinsky (1857-1947), American rabbi
- Zvi Elimelech Halberstam (born 1952), Israeli rebbe
- Zvi Hecker (1931-2023), Israeli architect
- Zvi Heifetz (born 1956), Israeli diplomat
- Zvi Hendel (born 1949), Israeli politician
- Zvi Hercowitz (born 1945), Israeli economist
- Zvi Hirsch Kaidanover (1650–1712), German rabbi
- Zvi Hirsch Kalischer (1795–1874), Orthodox German rabbi
- Zvi Kogan (1996-2024), Israeli-Moldovan rabbi killed in the United Arab Emirates
- Zvi Kolitz (1912-2002), Israeli film producer
- Zvi Laron (born 1927), Israeli physician
- Zvi Lieberman (1891–1985), Russian-born Israeli author
- Zvi Luria (1906–1968), Israeli politician
- Zvi Magen (born 1945), Israeli ambassador
- Zvi Mazel (born 1939), Israeli diplomat
- Zvi Mowshowitz (born 1979), American Magic: The Gathering player
- Zvi Nishri (Orloff) (1878–1973), Russian/Palestinian/Israeli pioneer in modern physical education
- Zvi Ofer (1932–1968), Israeli officer awarded the Medal of Valor
- Zvi Yaakov Oppenheim (1854–1926), Lithuanian rabbi
- Zvi Hermann Schapira (1840–1898), Russian mathematician
- Zvi Schreiber (born 1969), British-Israeli entrepreneur
- Zvi Segal (1901–1965), signatory of the Israeli Declaration of Independence
- Zvi Sherf (born 1951), Israeli basketball coach
- Zvi Sobolofsky, Orthodox American rabbi
- Zvi Thau (born 1939), Israeli rabbi
- Zvi Weinberg (1935–2006), Israeli politician
- Zvi Yair (1915–2005), Hungarian rabbi
- Zvi Yavetz (1925–2013), Israeli historian
- Zvi Yehezkeli (born 1970), Israeli journalist
- Zvi Yehuda (1887-1965), Israeli politician
- Zvi Yehuda Kook (1891–1982), Jewish theologian
- Zvi Zamir (1925–2024), Israeli general
- Zvi Zilker (1933-2021), Israeli politician
- Zvi Zimmerman (1913–2006), Israeli politician

== See also ==
- Tsvi, Tsvia, Tzvi, Tzvia, Zevi, Zvi, Tzvika/Zvika, Tsvi-Hirsh, Zebi Hirsch, Ben-Zvi, David-Zvi
