= Zebi Hirsch =

Zebi Hirsh or Zevi Hirsh is a Jewish masculine given name, a spelling variant of Tsvi-Hirsh. Notable people with the name include:

- Zebi Hirsch Bialeh
- Zevi Hirsch Edelmann
- Zebi Hirsch Filipowski
- Zebi Hirsch Scherschewski
- Zebi Hirsch Kaidanover
- Ẓebi Hirsch Lehren
- Zebi Hirsch Sundeles

== See also ==
- Tsvi, Tsvia, Tzvi, Tzvia, Zevi, Zvi, Tzvika/Zvika, Tsvi-Hirsh, Zebi Hirsch, Ben-Zvi, David-Zvi
- Hersch, Hersh, Herschel, Hirsch, Hirche, Tsvi-Hirsh, Zebi Hirsch
