= Zvika =

Name list

Zvika, Tzvika or Tzvikah (Hebrew: צביקה) is a masculine given name which may refer to:

- Zvika Brakerski, Israeli mathematician
- Tzvika Brot (born 1980), Israeli mayor of Bat Yam
- Tzvika Cohen, former drummer of the Israeli rock band Mofa Ha'arnavot Shel Dr. Kasper
- Zvika Fogel (born 1956), Israeli politician, activist and retired brigadier general
- Zvika Frank (born 1948), a Dutch-Israeli dancer, movement educator, university lecturer, and dance-movement therapist
- Zvika Greengold (born 1952), Israeli officer awarded the Medal of Valor and politician
- Zvika Hadar (born 1966), Israeli actor, comedian and television host
- Tzvika Hadar (bowls) (born 1958), Israeli international lawn bowler
- Zvi Ofer (1932–1968), Israeli officer awarded the Medal of Valor
- Zvika or Svika Pick (1949-2022), Israeli pop singer and composer
- Tzvika Tzemah, Israeli football manager in the 21st century

== See also ==
- Tsvi, Tsvia, Tzvi, Tzvia, Zevi, Zvi, Tzvika/Zvika, Tsvi-Hirsh, Zebi Hirsch, Ben-Zvi, David-Zvi
