= Zevi =

Zevi or Zebi are both a surname and a given name, variants of Zvi. Notable people with the name include:

== Surname ==
- Bruno Zevi (1918–2000), Italian architect, historian, professor, curator, writer and editor
- Fausto Zevi, Italian archaeologist
- Sabbatai Zevi (1626–1676), Ottoman rabbi
- Tullia Zevi (1919–2011), Italian journalist and writer

== Given name ==
- Abraham Zevi Idelsohn
- Zevi Eckhaus, American football player
- Zevi Joshua Horowitz
- Zevi Samet (born 2003), American college basketball player
- Zebi Hirsch Scherschewski
- Zevi Scharfstein
- Zevi Wolmark (born 1962), American actor

== See aso ==
- Tsvi, Tsvia, Tzvi, Tzvia, Zevi, Zvi, Tzvika/Zvika, Tsvi-Hirsh, Zebi Hirsch, Ben-Zvi, David-Zvi
