= Kenner Tenement =

Kennerów Tenement
- Kamienica Kennerów
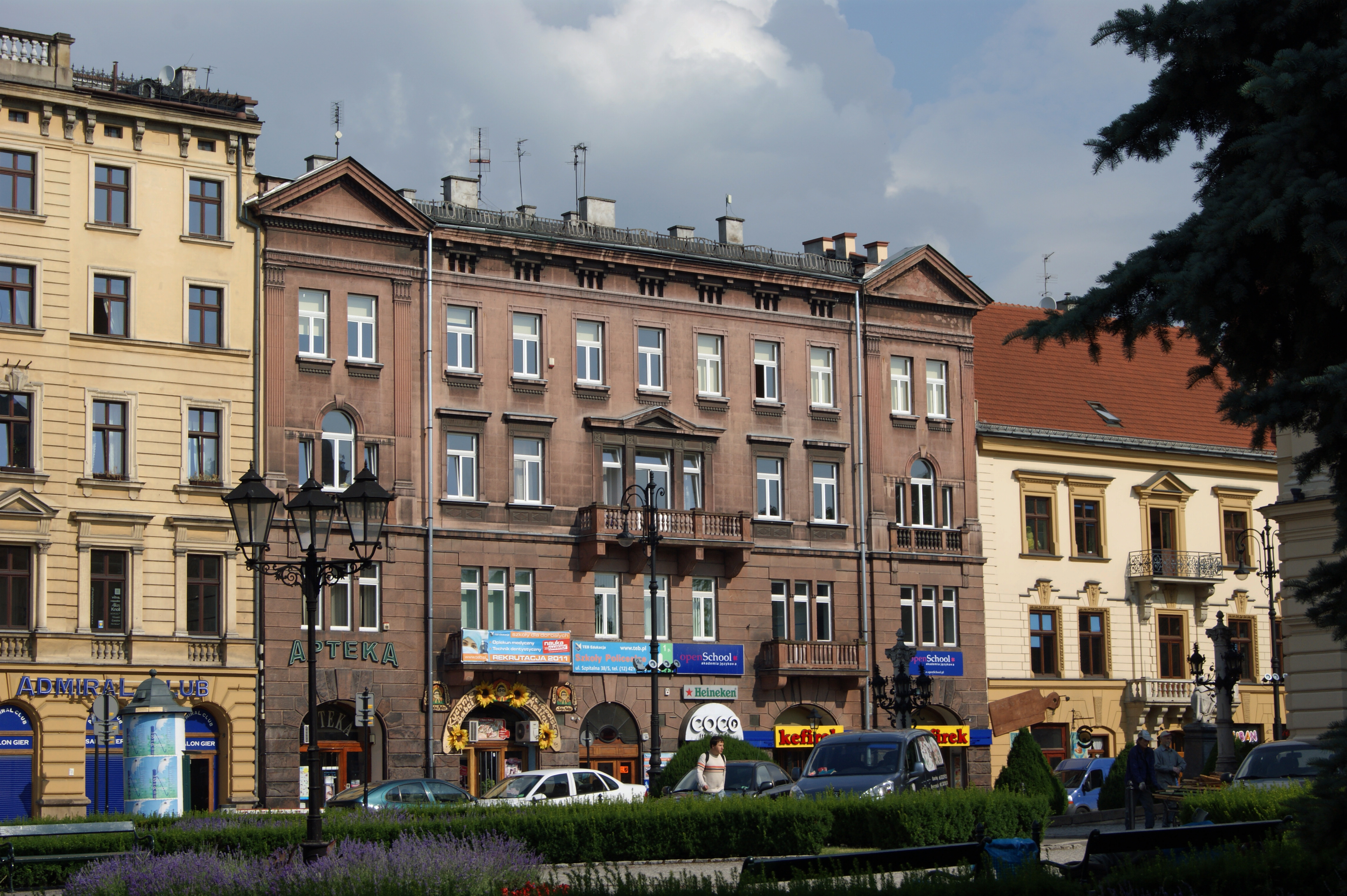

General information
- Location: 38 Szpitalna Street, Kraków, Poland
- Coordinates: 50°03′51.20″N 19°56′31.06″E
- Completed: 1912

Kennerów Tenement House (Polish: Kamienica Kennerów) is a tenement house located at 38 Szpitalna Street in Kraków in the District I Old Town.

== History ==
The tenement house with a modernist facade was built between 1910 and 1912, following the demolition of older buildings. It was designed by Kraków architect Teodor Hoffmann. The stairwell features stained-glass windows crafted by Kraków's S. G. Żeleński Stained Glass Workshop, based on a design by Anna Gramatyka-Ostrowska.

This rental tenement once housed establishments such as the Cyganeria Restaurant, opened in the late 1930s. During World War II, it operated as a "Nur für Deutsche" venue. On December 22, 1942, representatives of several Jewish underground organizations jointly carried out a successful attack on the restaurant (killing a Luftwaffe officer and injuring three others). One of the participants in this operation was Yitzhak Zuckerman. A plaque on the building's facade commemorates the attack.

On March 4, 1996, the tenement was entered into the Registry of Cultural Property. It is also entered into the municipal register of monuments of the Lesser Poland Voivodeship.
