= Bor, Mamor, Benye =

Gastro-cultural festival in Hungary

Bor, Mámor, Bénye Festival (Wine, Shine...Bénye) - festival in the gardens of Erdőbénye was born in 2009 from an ideas session of six wineries in Hungary, Tokaj Wine Region, Erdőbénye. The local wine makers, who later formed an association – have staged this gastro-cultural event every year since.

== History ==
=== The beginnings ===
The event was born in 2009 from an ideas session and cooperation between six local wineries. The first festival was a one-day event on 15 th August 2009 where, as well as the local wineries, Hungarian gastrobloggers and regional restaurants created dishes founded on Zemplén flavours and raw ingredients, thus developing a distinct gastro-thread.

Due to great interest, in 2010 the participants founded the Bor, Mámor, Bénye Association to be able to continue the work more professionally and since then it has been the Festival organizer.

Two years later, in 2011, the festival expanded with a Friday night opening concert and joint tasting of all where the participating wineries came together to present their wines at a guided tasting.

=== Expansion ===
By 2013 the festival ran Friday-Saturday- Sunday with more events. By then over 12 wineries had joined the initiative and the event had become known throughout Hungary and popular with wine lovers from Poland and the Carpathian Basin. The festival also offered a campsite and parking area by then. That is when the entry system was introduced.

=== Today ===
In 2016 the event was a four-day event, to be more precise three days+zero day. The opening concert which had been on Friday moved with the joint tasting to Thursday evening. In 2017 the date of the festival changed to early July. The event will return to the original August time in 2019.

== Venue ==
The event is held in Hungary, in the Tokaj Wine Region village of Erdőbénye, where the venues for the wide range of events are the local gardens and cellars of the wineries, churches, village house museum and nearby vineyards.

Current participants: Ábrahám Wine, Bardon Winery, Béres Vineyards and Winery, Budaházy-Fekete Kúria Winery, Csite Family Estate, Illés Cellar, Jakab Winery, Karádi-Berger Winery, Kerékgyártó Cellar, Préselő Winery, Pro Vinum Winery, Sanzon Tokaj, Vayi Winery.

== Gastronomy ==
It was primarily gastro-bloggers who created the dishes at the beginning. Over the years top restaurants from the region and Hungary came to the forefront. The organizers aim to show local ingredients and recipes in the long term. The Tokaj Wine Region produces white wines and the wines that can be tasted in the wineries’ cellars are mainly white wines: The main varieties are Furmint, Hárslevelű and Muscat Lunel along with cuvées hereof.

== Events ==
The long weekend starts with Thursday evening joint tasting in which all the wineries participate followed by a concert. The other days of the festival see the wineries’ gardens become the venues for events.

Music ranges through jazz, folk music and world music. Artists have performed here including Muzsikás, Viktor Tóth, Vilmos Gryllus, Mihály Dresch, but the organizers place great emphasis on bringing less well-known talents to the festival too. From 2018 the event also provides a home for the coopers’ dance, unique to this barrel-making village, and showing the traditions of barrel making. In addition there are exhibitions, literary readings and interviews, plus handcrafts, children's events, round table discussions, thematic tastings, bicycle tours and other events.

== More information ==
- Wine, Shine... Benye official homepage
- Wine, Shine... Benye community page
