= Tzvi =

Tzvi (Hebrew: צְבִי and צבי, Tzvi, Ṣvi, "gazelle") is a Jewish masculine given name. Notable people with this name include:

- Tzvi Ashkenazi (1656–1718), Dutch rabbi
- Tzvi Avni (born 1927), Israeli composer
- Tzvi Ayalon (1911–1993), Israeli general and ambassador
- Tzvi Hersh Mordechai Bonhardt (1826–1866), Polish rabbi
- Tzvi Hirsh Eichenstein (1763–1831), Galician rabbi
- Tzvi Erez (born 1967), Israeli-Canadian musician
- Tzvi Hirsch Ferber (1879–1966), Lithuanian-British rabbi
- Tzvi Hirsh Filipowski (1816–1872), Lithuanian-British Hebraist and actuary
- Tzvi Pesach Frank (1873–1960), Chief Rabbi of Jerusalem
- Tzvi Freeman (fl. 1990s–2020s), Canadian rabbi
- Tzvi Hersh Friedlander (fl. 1970s–2020s), American rabbi
- Tzvi Gluckin (born 1968), American author, speaker, and musician
- Tzvi Kushelevsky (born 1936), Israeli rabbi
- Tzvi Shissel (1946–2021), Israeli actor
- Tzvi Elimelech Spira of Dinov (1783–1841), Polish rabbi
- Tzvi Tzur (1923–2004), Israeli Chief of General Staff
- Tzvi Hersh Weinreb (born 1940), American rabbi

== See also ==
- Tsvi, Tsvia, Tzvi, Tzvia, Zevi, Zvi, Tzvika/Zvika, Tsvi-Hirsh, Zebi Hirsch, Ben-Zvi, David-Zvi
- Tzvia Greenfield (born 1945), Israeli politician
