= Roni Zuckerman =

Israeli Air Force pilot

- רוני צוקרמן
- Known for: 1st female jet fighter pilot for the Israeli Air Force
- Relatives: Yitzhak Zuckerman (grandfather); Zivia Lubetkin (grandmother)
- Military career
- Allegiance: Israel
- Branch: Israeli Air Force
- Service years: 2001 – present

Roni Zuckerman (Hebrew: רוני צוקרמן; born 1981) is an Israeli who served as the first female jet fighter pilot for the Israeli Air Force.

== Biography ==
Roni Zuckerman was born and raised on kibbutz Lohamei HaGeta'ot ("the Ghetto Fighters' kibbutz"), located near Haifa. Her father Shimon was an electrical engineer and her mother Mati was a doctor of genetic engineering. She is the granddaughter of Zivia Lubetkin and Yitzhak Zuckerman both of Polish-Jewish origin (also known as Icchak Cukierman), who were among the leaders of the Warsaw Ghetto Uprising during World War II and among the 34 fighters who survived. They were founding members of the kibbutz, which was established by former Jewish partisans in 1949. Zuckerman studied physics and computers at Salman Tzur High School at kibbutz Gesher HaZiv.

== Aviation career ==
Although women had served as pilots during the 1948 Arab-Israeli War and a few years thereafter, the Israel Defense Forces had, until 1995, denied women the opportunity to become pilots. After the prohibition was lifted, the first female graduate was F-16 navigator Sari Rahat in 1998, followed three years later by Zuckerman, the first female jet-fighter pilot in IAF history.

Another Israeli woman who took the course at the same time as Lt Zuckerman, but failed to qualify, described to a reporter the training as "mentally and physically exhausting." She stated, "I did 100 push-ups a day, which is difficult for a woman. Of the women on the course, only Roni qualified." Zuckerman received her wings in 2001, becoming the fourth female soldier to complete the pilots' course and the first to become a fighter pilot. She was assigned to an F-16 squadron as a fighter pilot and also later became a commander at the IAF flight academy. She was released from active service in 2007, although continued to do reserve duty.

== Later life ==
After her discharge, Zuckerman studied electrical engineering at Tel Aviv University, and became vice president of engineering, operations, and purchasing at an energy company. She is married with three children.

== See also ==
- Yael Rom
- Tamar Ariel
- Women in the Israel Defense Forces
