= Liska (Hasidic dynasty) =

Hungarian Hasidic dynasty

Liska is the name of a Hasidic dynasty founded by Rabbi Tzvi Hirsch Friedman (Frishman). It takes its name from the Yiddish name for Olaszliszka, a village in Borsod-Abaúj-Zemplén county, Hungary.

== Rabbi Tzvi Hersh Friedman ==
The first Lisker Rebbe, Rabbi Tzvi Hersh Friedman (Frishman), also known as Hershel Lisker, lived a very frugal life. He was born Tzvi Hersh Frishman, but changed his last name to Friedman to avoid being drafted to the army. Even though the community enjoyed great prosperity, he would not allow its leaders to raise his salary from one forint, which he received when first appointed to the position. He was a disciple of the Divrei Chaim of Tsanz. His Torah sayings are collected in Ach Pri Tevuah (Hebrew: אך פרי תבואה) and Hayoshor veHatov (Hebrew: הישר והטוב) (2 vols).

The money that he accrued from the people coming to seek his advice was distributed to the poor and to further the various programs he instituted. For himself he built a humble home so as to accommodate the multitude of people who came to see him and ask his advice.

Among his major accomplishments was the building of the synagogue. The synagogue was built in a grandiose manner and able to accommodate 500 people. It was one of the largest of his time in Hungary. The Synagogue was built without a foundation to commemorate the Destruction of the Temple — as a testimony to the temporary state of the Diaspora.

To the community and his followers he left the following dictum:

"Rely on the ancient tradition, to observe and uphold the conservative life-style, to hand it down from generation to generation."

The death of Tzvi Hersh Friedman (Frishman) in 1874 heralded the end of prosperity in the Jewish community of Liske. To this day, on the day of his yahrzeit, the 14th day of Av, thousands still converge to pray at his grave.

== Rabbi Chaim Friedlander ==
At the death of Hershel Lisker in 1874, the mantle of leadership fell to his son-in-law, Rav Chaim Friedlander (born 1840 in Kisvárda), who at that time was Rav of Erdőbénye. Hershel Lisker had no surviving son. Rav Chaim Friedlander was a descendant of the 16th Century Torah luminary, the Maharsha as well as of Rabbis Judah Loew ben Bezalel, David HaLevi Segal, Joel Sirkis, Isaiah Horowitz, and Naphtali Cohen. He himself was a Torah scholar and orator with a mellifluous voice. Among his writings were the Tal Chaim—a homiletical explanation of each parsha, Tal Chaim Uverocho a glossary on the Talmud.

At this time, there was a change in the political climate of Hungary plus a worsening of the economy. Nevertheless, the Rabbi and kehilla tried to continue with the social and religious services instituted by the first Lisker Rebbe under duress and hardship. Rav Chaim Friedlander's concern did not only pertain to the economic hardship, but to the new political climate that worried him. A proclamation went out throughout the land that all Jews should be imprisoned and killed and their properties confiscated. The Rebbe went to shul and prayed—he offered himself as a sacrifice if this terrible verdict could be averted.

The following week, as the Rabbi was sitting at the dinner table deep in thought, he took a piece of meat in his mouth, the food got lodged in his throat and he choked. It was believed that in the merit of this sacrifice, the tragedy against the Jews had been averted. The Tal Chaim, as he was called, died in 1904.

== Rabbi Tzvi Hersh Friedlander ==
Rabbi Tzvi Hersh Friedlander, son of Rav Chaim, became the third Lisker Rebbe upon his father's death.

The Baal Shaarei Hayasher, as he was known by his sefer, was married in the village of Mád, and was from the beth din of Rabbi Mordechai Winkler of Mád. Later he got a position as the chief rabbi of Gava (Gávavencsellő), a village in Szabolcs-Szatmár-Bereg county of Hungary, until his father died.

He wrote 30 seforim, his most famous being the Shar Hayushor, a commentary on Tehillim, which he wrote while in prison during the White Terror.

The third Lisker Rebbe was appropriately called "Charif (sharp) Hershele" because of his outstanding sharp mind. Besides writing books and fulfilling the position of Rabbi, he also led a yeshiva disseminating Torah knowledge in his inimitable manner with a good smile and a good spirit. When the Holocaust occurred, the chassidim wanted to save him but he refused because he felt that his place and fate was with his townspeople. In his message to his son Rav Yosef, he said, "I know you will be saved and carry on as a designate (a successor to his father) to me from now on."

He and most of his family perished during the Holocaust.

== Liska in America ==
After the Holocaust, his youngest son Rav Yosef (Yozef) moved to America, with his rebbetzin and one-year-old son, the present Lisker Rebbi. Rav Yosef worked endlessly to rebuild Lisker on this side of the Atlantic; until his sudden death on 28 Shevat, 1971.

Thirty years after his death, his writings were published for the first time by Rabbi Yisroel Friedlander, until the present 2 volumes of Tzvi V’Chammid were released, and more is to be published in the near future.

There was an additional Liska congregation, based originally in the Bronx and subsequently on the Upper East Side, which closed in 2014. This congregation was started by Rabbi Solomon Friedlander and was known for its Bikur cholim. This congregation was also involved in a faith healing scandal.

== Lineage ==
- Rabbi Tzvi Hersh Friedman (Frishman) (1808-1874) was a son of the hidden tzadik Rabbi Aharon Frishman and Sara (daughter of Rafael) of Ujhel.
  - Rabbi Chaim Friedlander (died 1904), author of Tal Chayim – son-in-law of Rabbi Tsvi Hirsh
    - Rabbi Tzvi Hersh Friedlander
      - Rabbi Yosef (Yozef) Friedlander
        - Rabbi Tzvi Hersh Friedlander, present Lisker Rebbe
        - Rabbi Avrohom Yehoshua Heschel Friedlander, the Hivniv Rebbe
          - Rabbi Yisroel Friedlander
        - Pearl Gitel Leifer
      - Rabbi Solomon Friedlander
        - Rabbi Chaim Friedlander
          - Rabbi Abraham Friedlander
            - Rabbi Zvi Hersh Friedlander
