= Tsvia =

Tsvia, Zvia, or Tzvia (Hebrew: צביה) is a Hebrew masculine given name. Notable people with the name include:

- Tsvia Walden (born 1946), Israeli linguist
- Tzvia Greenfield, Israeli politician
- Zvia Agur, Israeli mathematical biologist

== See also ==
- Tsvi, Tsvia, Tzvi, Tzvia, Zevi, Zvi, Tzvika/Zvika, Tsvi-Hirsh, Zebi Hirsch, Ben-Zvi, David-Zvi
- Ma'ale Tzviya, community settlement in northern Israel
- Zviad, Georgian given name
