= Tsvi =

Tsvi is a Hebrew masculine given name and may refer to:

- Tsvi Hirsh Bonhardt (1745–1810), German-born Polish rabbi
- Tsvi Misinai (born 1946), Israeli researcher, author, historian, computer scientist and entrepreneur
- Tsvi C. Nussbaum (born 1935), American physician
- Tsvi Piran (born 1949), Israeli theoretical physicist and astrophysicist

== See also ==
- Tsvi, Tsvia, Tzvi, Tzvia, Zevi, Zvi, Tzvika/Zvika, Tsvi-Hirsh, Zebi Hirsch, Ben-Zvi, David-Zvi
