= David-Zvi =

David-Zvi of David-Tzvi (Hebrew: דוד צבי) is a Jewish given name. Notable people with the name include:

- David Zvi Hoffmann (1843–1921), Orthodox Rabbi and Torah scholar in Germany
- David-Zvi Pinkas (1895–1952), Zionist activist and Israeli politician

== See also ==
- Tsvi, Tsvia, Tzvi, Tzvia, Zevi, Zvi, Tzvika/Zvika, Tsvi-Hirsh, Zebi Hirsch, Ben-Zvi, David-Zvi
