= Moses Jaffe of Kraków =

Bohemian rabbi and scholar

Moses ben Eliezer Jaffe II of Kraków (Hebrew: משה בן אליעזר יפה השני מקראקוב; died 1520) was a 15th and 16th century Bohemian rabbi and scholar. He is also the maternal grandfather of Joel Sirkis.

Born in Hořovice, Kingdom of Bohemia in the late 15th century, his father Eliezer ben Abraham Jaffe was a rabbi in Hořovice and was the son of Abraham Jaffe of Bohemia. In his early years, Moses learnt under his father, later moving to Kraków, Poland where he served as the city's rabbi. He later died in 1520 in Kraków.
