= Joseph Steinhardt =

German rabbi

Joseph ben Menahem Mendel Steinhardt (ca. 1720–1776) was a German rabbi who lived in his early year in Schwabach, Bavaria. His first position as rabbi was as the rabbi of Rixheim, and shortly afterward he was elected chief rabbi of Upper Alsace. In 1755 he was chosen chief rabbi of Nieder-Ehenheim in Lower Alsace, and eight years later was called as rabbi to Fürth, where he officiated until his death.

Steinhardt was one of the foremost Talmudists of his time, and questions were addressed to him from Hungary, Italy (Verona), the Netherlands (Amsterdam), and Switzerland. He was very pious, and induced the lord of the manor of Nieder-Ehenheim to forbid men and women dancing together. His attitude in his controversy with rabbi Yeshaye Pick regarding Eleazar Kalir is also noteworthy, since he maintained that the word "Be-Rabbi" was not a second name, but merely an honorary title of Kalir's, who he claimed was a contemporary of Saadia.

Steinhardt was the author of the following works:

- Zikron Yosef (Fürth, 1773), a work in four parts, containing responsa and decisions modeled on the ritual codices
- Mashbir Bar (Prague, 1827), comprising notes on the Pentateuch
- Koaḥ Shor (ib. 1827), containing novellæ on the treatise Baba Batra, with notes by his grandson Akiba

== Jewish Encyclopedia bibliography ==
- Moritz Steinschneider, Cat. Bodl. col. 1533;
- Eliakim Carmoly, in Revue Orientale, iii. 307;
- Frankel, in Orient, Lit. viii. 246.
