= Zivia Lubetkin =

Polish Jewish underground leader (1914–1978)

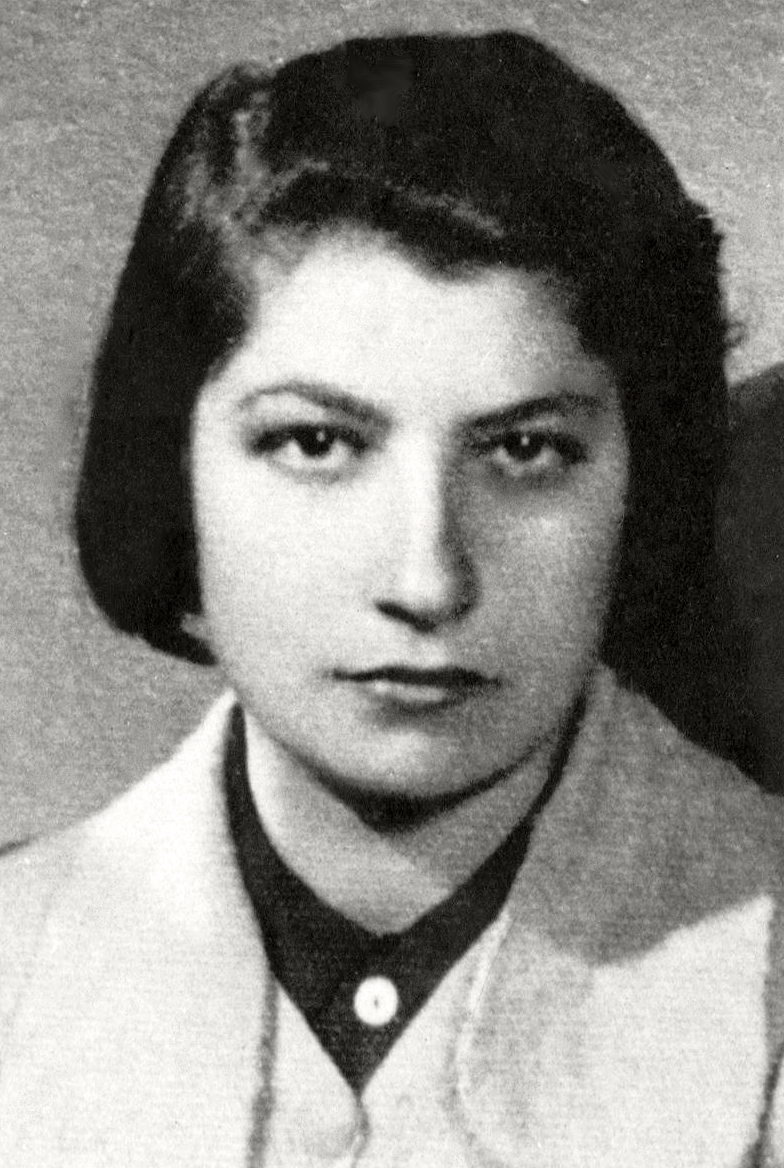
- Lubetkin circa 1939
- Born: 9 November 1914; Byteń, Grodno Governorate, Russian Empire
- Died: 11 July 1978 (aged 63); Lohamei HaGeta'ot, Israel
- Known for: One of the leaders of the Żydowska Organizacja Bojowa (Jewish Combat Organization), participant in the Warsaw Ghetto Uprising and the Warsaw Uprising
- Spouse: Yitzhak Zuckerman (m. 1946)

Zivia Lubetkin (Polish: Cywia Lubetkin, IPA: [ˈt͡sɨvja luˈbɛtkʲin], Hebrew: צביה לובטקין, nom de guerre: Celina; 9 November 1914 – 11 July 1978) was one of the leaders of the Jewish underground in Nazi-occupied Warsaw and the only woman on the High Command of the resistance group Żydowska Organizacja Bojowa (ŻOB). She survived the Holocaust in German-occupied Poland and immigrated to Mandate Palestine in 1946, at the age of 32.

== Biography ==
=== Pre-World War II ===
Zivia Lubetkin was born in Byteń in the Grodno Governorate of the Russian Empire (present-day Belarus). She joined the Labor Zionist Movement at an early age. During her school years, Lubetkin was educated in Hebrew by private tutors. In her late teens she joined the Zionist youth movement Dror, and in 1938 became a member of its Executive Council. In August 1939, she attended the twenty-first Zionist Congress as a delegate of the Eretz Israel Labor bloc.

After Nazi Germany and later the Soviet Union invaded Poland in September 1939 she made a perilous journey from the Soviet occupied part of the country to Warsaw to join the underground there.

=== World War II ===
In 1942, Lubetkin helped found the left-wing Zionist Anti-Fascist Bloc. This would be the first resistance organization in the Warsaw Ghetto to confront the German forces in combat. She also, as one of the founders of the ŻOB, served on the Warsaw Jewish community's political council, the Jewish National Committee (Żydowski Komitet Narodowy; ŻKN), and also served on the Coordinating Committee, an umbrella organization comprising the ŻKN and the non-Zionist General Jewish Labour Bund (Bund), that sponsored the ŻOB. During her years of underground activities, the name "Cywia" became the code word for Poland in letters sent by various resistance groups both within and outside of the Warsaw Ghetto. She was one of the leaders of the Warsaw Ghetto Uprising and one of only 34 fighters to survive the war. After leading her group of surviving fighters through the sewers of Warsaw with the aid of Simcha "Kazik" Rotem in the final days of the ghetto uprising (on 10 May 1943) she continued her resistance activities in the rest of Warsaw outside the ghetto. She took part in the Polish Warsaw Uprising in 1944, fighting in the units of the Armia Ludowa. Though the Jewish forces would be devastated by the Germans, Lubetkin and several others survived by taking refuge in a hospital that was willing to hide them. On 1 March 1945, she attempted to immigrate to Palestine with partisan leader Abba Kovner. This move proved unsuccessful as the only available route was blocked, causing Lubetkin to return to Warsaw.

Lubetkin was issued a Paraguayan passport by the Ładoś Group.

=== Postwar life ===
Following the Second World War, Lubetkin was active in the Holocaust survivors community in Europe, and helped organize the Bricha, an organization staffed by operatives who helped Eastern and Central European Jews cross borders en route to Mandate Palestine by illegal immigration channels. She herself immigrated to Mandate Palestine in 1946. She married Yitzhak Zuckerman, the ŻOB commander, and they, along with other surviving ghetto fighters and partisans founded Kibbutz Lohamei HaGeta'ot and the Ghetto Fighters' House museum located on its grounds. In 1961, she testified at the trial of captured Nazi war criminal Adolf Eichmann.

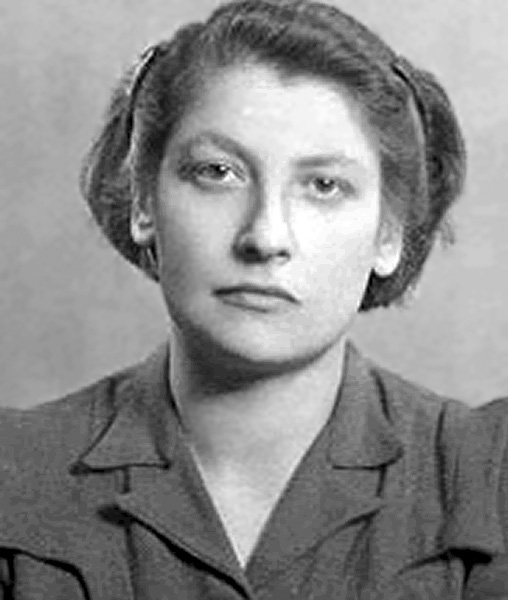
Zivia Lubetkin circa 1946

Her two children, Shimon (b. 1947) and Yael (b. 1949), were born on Kibbutz Lohamei HaGetta’ot. Lubetkin lived there for the remainder of her life, dying on 11 July 1978. Her granddaughter, Roni Zuckerman, became the Israeli Air Force's first female fighter pilot in 2001. In the 2001 television film Uprising, she was portrayed by English actress Sadie Frost.

== Writings ==
- Lubetkin, Ziviah. (sic) Die letzten Tage des Warschauer Gettos. pp. 47, illus. Berlin: VVN-Verlag, 1949 (from: Commentary (magazine), New York). Also in: Neue Auslese. ed. Alliierter Informationsdienst, Berlin, no. 1, 1948, pp. 1–13
- Lubetkin, Zivia. Aharonim `al ha-homah. (Ein Harod, 1946/47)
- Lubetkin, Zivia. Bi-yemei kilayon va-mered (In the Days of Destruction and Revolt). Pp. 127. Tel Aviv: HaKibbutz HaMeuchad, 1953.
  - ------------- In the days of destruction and revolt translated from Hebrew by Ishai Tubbin; revised by Yehiel Yanay; biographical index by Yitzhak Zuckerman; biographical index translated by Debby Garber. Pp. 338, illus. Tel Aviv: Hakibbutz Hameuchad Pub. House: Am Oved Pub. House, 1981
