= Zeev Ben-Zvi =

Polish-Israeli sculptor (1904–1952)

- זאב בן־צבי
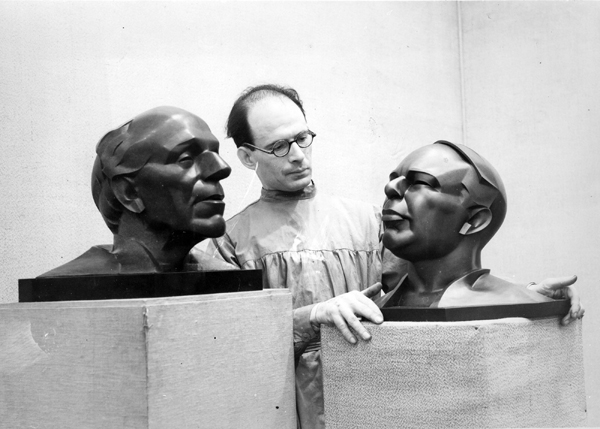
- Zeev Ben-Zvi (1938); Photo from the Information Center for Israeli Art archive, Israel Museum, Jerusalem
- Born: Beniamin Kujawski; 1904; Ryki, Congress Poland
- Died: 1952 (aged 47–48)
- Occupation: Sculptor
- Awards: Dizengoff Prize for Sculpture (1953); Israel Prize (1953)

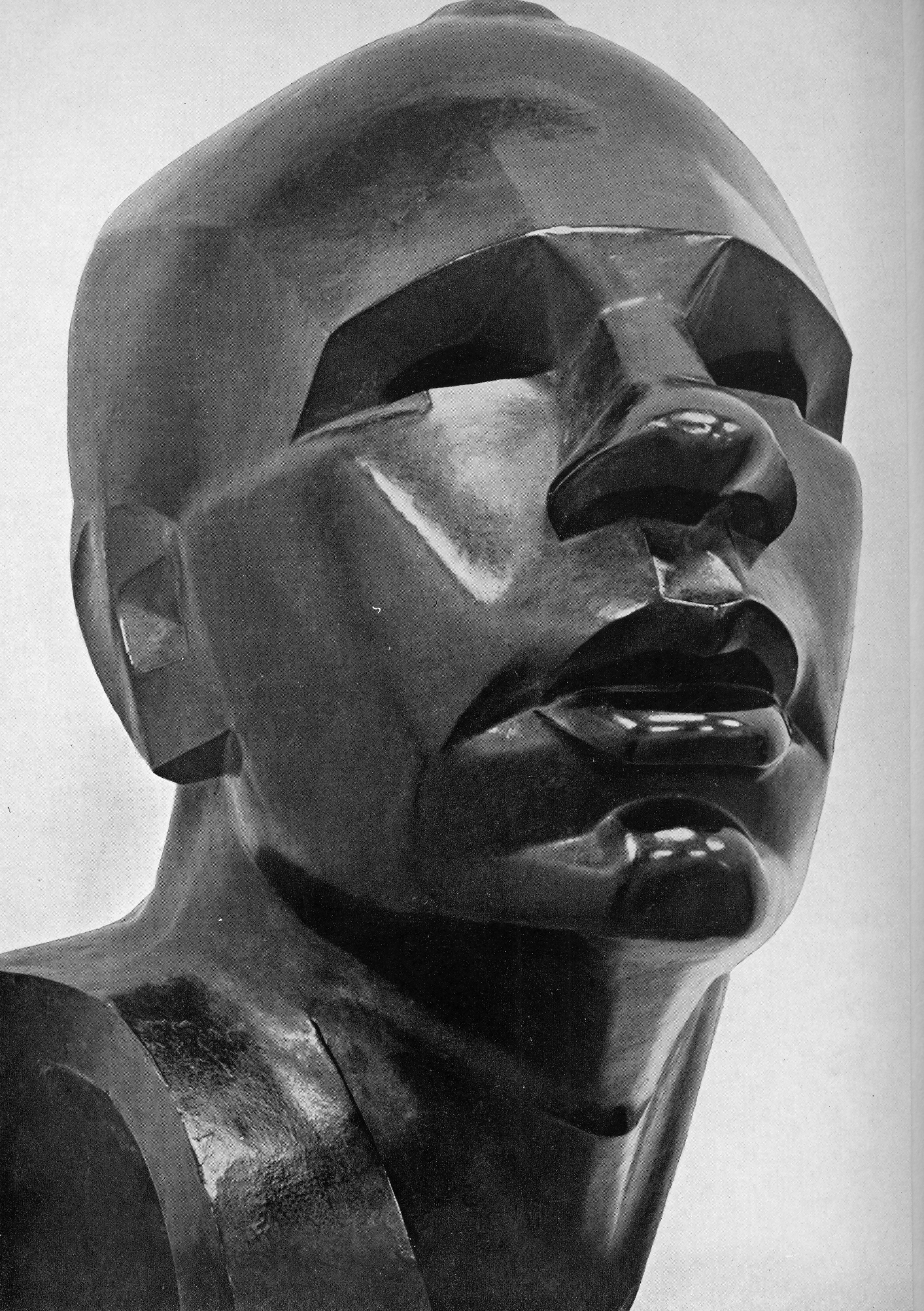
Portrait of Aharon Meskin

Zeev Ben-Zvi (Hebrew: זאב בן־צבי; 1904–1952) was a Polish-Israeli sculptor born in Ryki, Congress Poland, whose work influenced a generation of sculptors.

== Biography ==
Born Beniamin Kujawski, Zeev Ben-Zvi studied at Academy of Fine Art in Warsaw. In 1923, he immigrated to Mandatory Palestine, where he studied at the Bezalel School of Art in Jerusalem from 1923 to 1924.

When the New Bezalel School opened, he taught sculpture there from 1926 to 1927. In 1937, he travelled to Paris and then to London from 1937 to 1938.

He specialized in portrait heads in beaten copper and mounded plaster, which he treated in a cubist manner. In 1947, he created the monument "In Memory of the Children of the Diaspora" in Mishmar Haemek.

== Awards and recognition ==
- In 1953, Ben Zvi received the Dizengoff Prize for Sculpture.
- Also in 1953, he was awarded the Israel Prize, for sculpture, being the inaugural year of the prize, and was accordingly the first artist to be awarded this honor.

== See also ==
- List of Israel Prize recipients
- List of Polish Jews
- Ben-Zvi
