= Isaiah Berlin (rabbi) =

German rabbi and Talmudist

Personal life
- Born: October 1719 Eisenstadt, Kingdom of Hungary
- Died: May 13, 1799 (aged 79) Breslau, Prussia

Religious life
- Religion: Judaism

Isaiah Berlin also known as Yeshaye Pick (c. October 1719 in Eisenstadt, Kingdom of Hungary – May 13, 1799 in Breslau), was a German Talmudist.

== Biography ==
Berlin studied under Ẓevi Hirsch Bialeh (Ḥarif), the rabbi of Halberstadt, at the latter's yeshivah. In 1755 Berlin moved to Breslau where he engaged in business. In 1793, when already advanced in years, he was elected to a rabbinical post, being appointed to succeed Isaac Joseph Te'omim as rabbi of Breslau. His election was marked by a dispute between the members of the community and the local maskilim, who had begun to organize themselves as a body and opposed Berlin, who, despite his love of peace, openly attacked their ideas. Berlin was elected by an overwhelming majority.

Berlin was greatly admired, even by persons who differed with him in religious views. According to ḥasidic sources, Berlin was sympathetically disposed toward that movement and extended a friendly welcome to one of its emissaries, Jacob Samson of Spitsevka. Further, Joel Brill, Aaron Wolfsohn, Judah Bensew, and many other Maskilim of Breslau often visited him to seek advice on scientific questions. As the Maskilim always carefully avoided wounding Berlin's religious feelings, he on his part met them half-way in many things. On the occasion of the Peace of Basel, for instance (May 17, 1795), he held a solemn service in the synagogue and exceptionally permitted the use of instrumental music, he himself delivering a discourse which was highly praised by the press (Schlesische Zeitung, 1795, No. 59). Thus Berlin, conciliated the hostile elements of his congregation, and his death was mourned equally by all.

== Literary activity ==
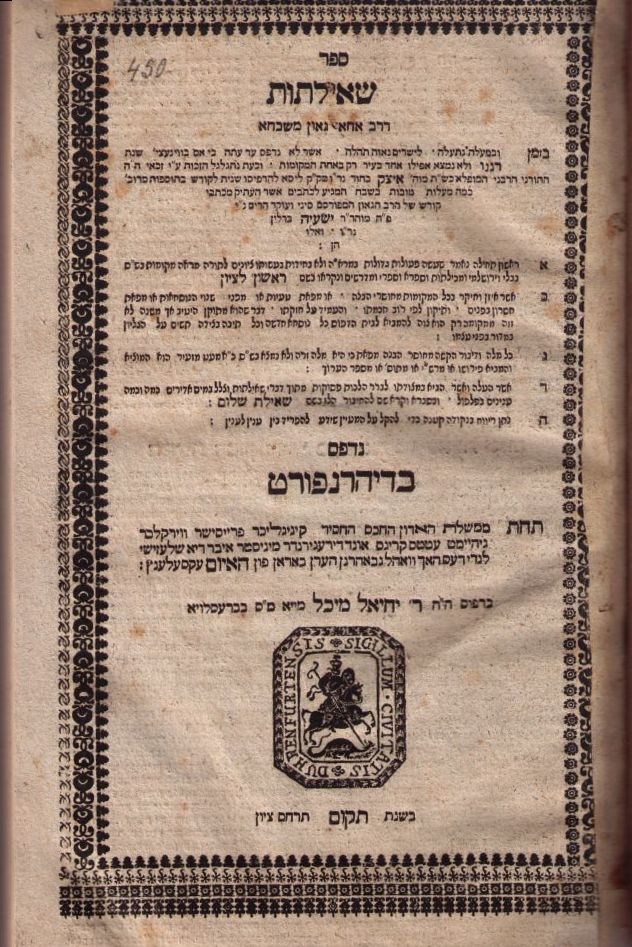
"She'iltot" of Rabbi Achai Gaon

Berlin's had the habit of annotating almost every book he read; mentioning the sources, or noting parallel passages and variant readings. Such glosses by Berlin have been published on the following books: the Bible (Pentateuch, Dyhernfurth, 1775; the other books, ib., 1807); the prayer-book, ed. Tiḳḳun Shelomoh (ib., 1806); Maimonides' Yad ha-Ḥazaḳah (ib., 1809); Alfasi (Presburg, 1836); the Ḥinnuk (Vienna, 1827); Malachi b. Jacob's methodology, Yad Malachi (Berlin, 1825); Elijah b. Moses de Vidas' book of morals, Reshit Ḥokmah (Dyhernfurth, 1811).

Although the terse yet clear notes contained in these volumes reveal the immense learning and critical insight of their author, yet Berlin's lasting place of honor among the pioneers of Talmudic criticism rests on the following works, which treat principally of the Talmud: (1) Omer ha-Shikḥah (Forgotten Word), Königsberg, 1860, containing a large number of Halakot on the Talmud not noted by the codifiers; (2) Oẓar Balum (Full Treasure), in the edition of Jacob ibn Ḥabib's 'En Ya'aḳob, published at Wilna in 1899, tracing all the Talmudic passages quoted without sources in the different commentaries on the haggadic elements of the Talmud; (3) Haggahot ha-Shas (Notes to the Talmud), textual corrections and notes on the origin of parallel passages (Dyhernfurth, 1800, and in nearly all the editions of the Talmud); (4) Hafla'ah Sheba-'Arakin (Detached Orders) (part i., Breslau, 1830; part ii., Vienna, 1859), containing, as the title indicates, explanations and glosses on the 'Aruk; (5) Ḥiddushe ha-Shas, novellæ on the Talmud (Königsberg, 1860, and in several editions of the Talmud); (6) Minè Targuma (Dessert Dishes), Breslau, 1831, remarks on the Targum Onkelos (the word "Targuma" signifying both "Targum" and "dessert", equivalent to the Greek τράγημα) and on the Palestinian Targum; (7) Kashiyot Meyushab (Difficulties Answered), Königsberg, 1860, treating of the Talmudic passages which end with the word kashia ("it is difficult"), and written by Berlin in fourteen days; (8) Rishon leẒiyyun (Dyhernfurth, 1793; Vienna, 1793, and several times reprinted, the title being a play on, "Zion", and, "index"), a collection of indexes and parallel passages in the Midrash; (9) She'elat Shalom (Greeting of Peace), Dyhernfurth, 1786, a commentary on Aḥa of Shubḥa's She'iltot. Berlin's responsa collection and his commentary on the Tosefta deserve especial mention, though nothing is known of their fate.

Berlin, was the first—at least among the Germans—who showed an interest in the history of post-Talmudic literature; and it was he, who opened the Kalir question (compare his letter to his brother-in-law, Joseph b. Menaḥem Steinhart, in the latter's Zikron Yosef, No. 15.
