= Bezalel ha-Levi of Zolkiew =

18th-century Ukrainian rabbi

Bezalel b. Judah ha-Levi Horowitz of Zolkiew also called Bezalel Zolkiewer was Polish Talmudist of the second half of the eighteenth century, chiefly known for his commentary on Pirkei Avoth entitled be-Shem Bezalel (Frankfurt on the Oder, 1781).

A native of Zolkiew, through his father, R. Bezalel was a member of the noted Horowitz family. His mother was the daughter of R. Hanokh Heinokh Ashkenazi, a descendant of R. Joel Sirkis (1561–1640), and the son-in-law of the court Jew Jakub Becal (d. 1696), from whom he inherited much wealth. Using his wealth, R. Bezalel was the benefactor of several causes and rabbinic texts, most notably sponsoring the publication of the Jerusalem Talmud in 1742 in Frankfurt.

R. Bezalel married the daughter of R. Abraham Abele Bonems (d. 1747), the grandson of R. Moses Bonems (1600–1668), with whom he had two daughters;

- Sarah Horowitz, the wife of R. Zevi Hirsch Bonhardt of Wodzislaw and mother of R. Simcha Bunim Bonhardt of Peshischa.
- Sheva Horowitz, the mother of R. Abraham Shevas, the father-in-law of R. Saul Katz Greenfield, author of Eshkol Enovim (Cracow, 1906).
