= Yitzhak Zuckerman =

Polish Jewish resistance fighter (1915–1981)

- יצחק צוקרמן
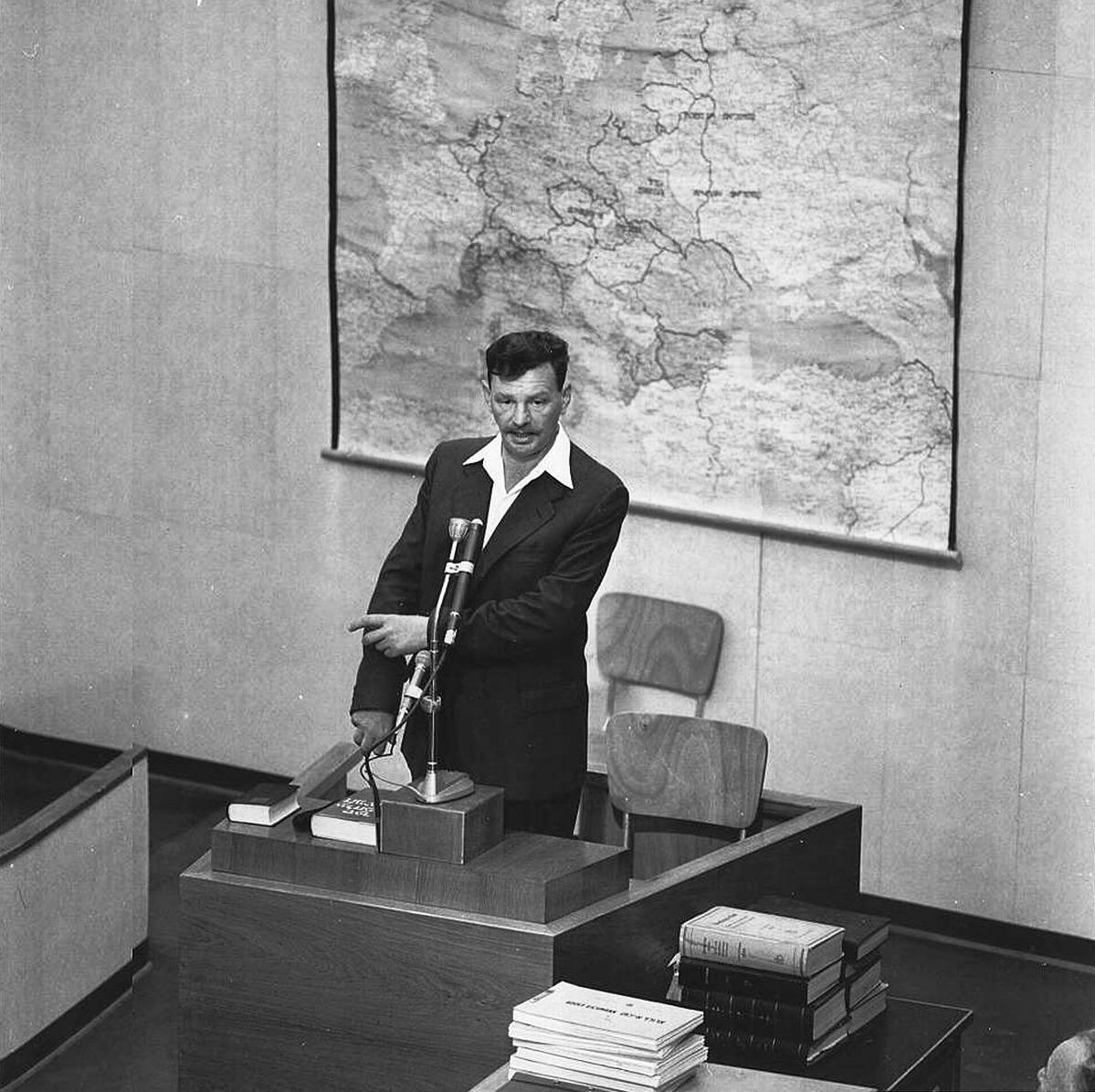
- Yitzhak Zuckerman testifies for the prosecution during the trial of Adolf Eichmann in 1961.
- Born: 13 December 1915; Vilna, Vilna Governorate, Russian Empire
- Died: 17 June 1981 (aged 65); Lohamei HaGeta'ot, Israel
- Known for: One of the leaders of the Warsaw Ghetto Uprising
- Spouse: Zivia Lubetkin (m. 1946)
- Children: 2
- Relatives: Roni Zuckerman (granddaughter) Richard Rodriguez Mendez Zuckerman distant cousin

Yitzhak Zuckerman (Polish: Icchak Cukierman; Hebrew: יצחק צוקרמן; 13 December 1915 – 17 June 1981), also known by his nom de guerre "Antek", was one of the leaders of the Warsaw Ghetto Uprising in 1943 against Nazi Germany during World War II.

== Biography ==
Zuckerman was born on December 13, 1915, in Vilnius, then part of the Russian Empire. After World War I Vilnius became part of the recreated Polish state. As a young man, he embraced the concepts of Labor Zionism. He graduated from a religious elementary school associated with the Mizrachi Zionist movement, followed by a Hebrew gymnasium in 1933. He applied to study at the University of Vilnius and Hebrew University in Jerusalem, but never began university studies.

In his youth, he became involved with the Zionist movement, as a member of HeHalutz and HeHalutz Hatzair. He lived in a Vilnius kibbutz on Subocz Street, then on a farm training pioneers in Grochów near Warsaw. In 1937, he became a member of the HeHalutz Hatzair Central Committee, and in 1938 he took over as secretary general of the Dror-Hehalutz.

After the German and Soviet invasion of Poland in 1939 he was in the area overrun by the Red Army and initially stayed in the Soviet zone of occupation, where he took an active part in the creation of various Jewish underground socialist organisations. In the spring of 1940 he moved to Warsaw, where he became one of the leaders of the Dror Hechaluc youth movement, along with his future wife Zivia Lubetkin. Zuckerman was issued a false passport by the Ładoś Group.

In 1941 he became the deputy commander of the ŻOB resistance organisation. In this capacity, he served mainly as the envoy between the commander of ŻOB and the commanders of the Polish resistance organizations of Armia Krajowa and Armia Ludowa. On 22 December 1942 he and two accomplices attacked a café in Kraków that was being used by the SS and Gestapo. Zuckerman was wounded and narrowly escaped, and his two comrades were tracked down and killed.

In 1943, he was working on the "Aryan" side of Warsaw to procure guns and ammunition when the Warsaw Ghetto Uprising erupted. Unable to enter the ghetto to join his comrades in battle, he nonetheless proved a crucial link between resistance forces within the ghetto and the Home Army on the "Aryan" side. Along with Simcha "Kazik" Rotem, he organized the escape of the surviving ZOB fighters through the sewers to safety. During the later Warsaw Uprising of 1944, he led a small troop of 322 survivors of the Ghetto Uprising as they fought the Germans in the ranks of the Armia Ludowa.

After the war he worked as part of the Bricha network, whose operatives smuggled Jewish refugees out of Eastern and Central Europe to Mandate Palestine. In 1947 he himself made that journey, settling in what would soon be Israel. There he and his wife Zivia, along with other veterans of the ghetto undergrounds and former partisans, were among the founding members of Kibbutz Lohamei HaGeta'ot and the Ghetto Fighters' House (GFH) museum located on its grounds, commemorating those who struggled against the Nazis. GFH has a study center named for Zivia and Yitzhak Zuckerman. Zuckerman and Lubetkin settled in Lohamei HaGeta'ot and had two children, Shimon (b. 1947) and Yael (b. 1949).

In 1961 he appeared as a witness at the trial of Nazi war criminal Adolf Eichmann in Israel. He died in 1981, in the kibbutz he had founded.

A record of a lengthy interview he gave in 1976 was expanded into the book Sheva ha-Shanim ha-Hen: 1939-1946 [Hebrew: Those Seven Years] published in Israel in 1991, later translated into English and published as A Surplus of Memory: Chronicle of the Warsaw Ghetto Uprising.

His granddaughter Roni Zuckerman became the Israeli Air Force's first female fighter pilot.

In 2001, the tale of the Warsaw Ghetto Uprising was turned into a made-for-TV film entitled Uprising, with actor David Schwimmer portraying Zuckerman.

== See also ==
- Marek Edelman
- Izrael Kanal
- Zivia Lubetkin
- Tema Schneiderman

== Bibliography ==
- Nir Itzik, "The Testimonies of Yitzhak (Antek) Zuckerman from Wartime to Those Seven Years: A Reassessment", Moreshet Journal for the Study of the Holocaust and Antisemitism, vol. 16/2019, pp. 135–183.
- Yitzhak Zuckerman, A Surplus of Memory: Chronicle of the Warsaw Ghetto Uprising; translated and edited by Barbara Harshav. Berkeley: University of California Press, 1993. ISBN 0-520-07841-1
- Yitzhak Zuckerman, 'A life in the ghetto'; translated and edited by Barbara Harshav.
