= Zvika Dror =

Israeli historian (1926–2025)

Zvi Dror (Hebrew: צבי דרור; 1 September 1926 – 14 July 2025), better known as Zvika Dror (Hebrew: צביקה דרור) was an Israeli historian of Zionism and the creation of the state of Israel. His books were published in Hebrew.

== Life and career ==
Dror was born on 1 September 1926. He was a member of Kibbutz Lohamei HaGeta'ot.

Tom Segev describes Dror as the "author of one of the most important books ever written about Holocaust survivors in Israel", a four-volume work that chronicles the lives of the survivors who founded Kibbutz Lohamei HaGeta'ot. According to Anita Shapira, who translates the title as "Testimony pages" the stories of the 96 founders recorded by Dror were "one of the first projects to coax the mute to speak" about the Holocaust. Many of the founders of Lohamei HaGeta'ot—whose stories Dror recorded—had participated in the Warsaw Ghetto Uprising.

Dror wrote on the founding of Kibbutz Beit HaArava, as well as a biography of Palmach commander Yitzhak Sadeh.

Dor died on 14 July 2025, at the age of 98.

== Books ==
- Hativat Palmach – Harel bamaarakha al Yerushalayim 5708/1948 (English: Palmach Brigade in Jerusalem), by Zvi Dror, Hakibbutz Hameuchad.
- Shutfut Bema'aseh Habria (English literal translation, "Participating in the Act of Creation") Hakibbutz Hame'uhad Publishing House.
