= Zviad =

Name list

Zviad (Georgian: ზვიად) is a Georgian masculine given name. Notable people with the name include:

- Zviad Endeladze (born 1966), Georgian footballer
- Zviad Gamsakhurdia (1939–1993), dissident, scientist, writer; the first elected post-Soviet President of the Republic of Georgia
- Zviad Izoria (born 1984), chess grandmaster
- Zviad Jeladze (born 1973), Georgian footballer
- Zviad Kvachantiradze (born 1965), Georgian diplomat
- Zviad Shalamberidze, Georgian politician
- Zviad Sturua (born 1978), Georgian association footballer
