= Lohamei HaGeta'ot =

Kibbutz in northern Israel

Lohamei HaGeta'ot: לוֹחֲמֵי הַגֵּטָאוֹת (Hebrew)
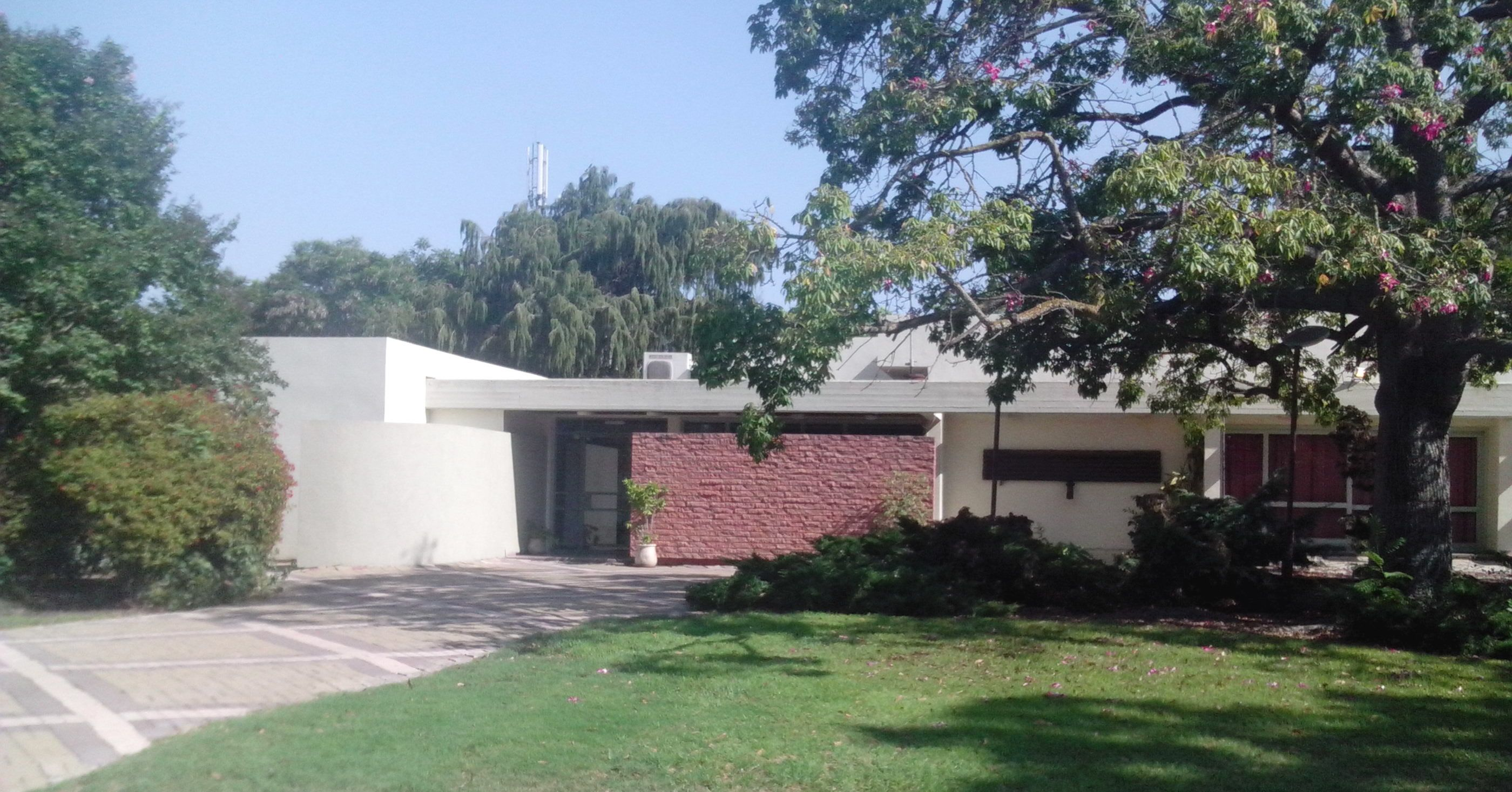
- Etymology: Ghetto fighters
- Location within Northwest Israel Location within Israel
- Coordinates: 32°57′46″N 35°5′45″E
- Country: Israel
- District: Northern
- Subdistrict: Acre
- Council: Mateh Asher
- Affiliation: Kibbutz Movement
- Founded: 1949
- Founder: Surviving fighters of the Warsaw Ghetto Uprising, former Jewish partisans and other Holocaust survivors.
- Population (2024): 989

Lohamei HaGeta'ot (Hebrew: לוֹחֲמֵי הַגֵּיטָאוֹת, lit. The Ghetto Fighters) is a kibbutz in northern Israel. Located in the western Galilee, it falls under the jurisdiction of Mateh Asher Regional Council. In 2024 it had a population of 989.

== History ==
The kibbutz was founded by Holocaust survivors in 1949 on the coastal highway between Acre and Nahariya, on the site of an abandoned British Army base and the depopulated Palestinian village of al-Sumayriyya. Its founding members include surviving fighters of the Warsaw Ghetto Uprising (notably Yitzhak Zuckerman, ŻOB deputy commander and Zivia Lubetkin, one of the few female leaders of ZOB), as well as former Jewish partisans and other Holocaust survivors. Its name commemorates the Jews who fought the Nazis.

Historian Tom Segev describes Zvi Dror's four-volume history of the lives of the Holocaust survivors who founded the kibbutz as one of the most important books ever written about Holocaust survivors in Israel." Anita Shapira, who translates the title as "Testimony pages," describes Dror's book as "one of the first projects to coax the mute to speak" about the Holocaust.

Leon Uris spent a week interviewing residents of the kibbutz and recording their experiences as part of his research for the novel Exodus.

== Economy ==
In the mid-1980s the kibbutz acquired the Tivall vegetarian food products factory, which has become a mainstay of its income. Other branches include a large dairy and agriculture and a bed and breakfast. The kibbutz is currently undergoing a process of privatization. It operates a bed and breakfast for tourists to the area.

== Archaeology ==
Alongside the kibbutz are the extensive remains of an aqueduct which supplied water to Acre some 6 km away, until 1948. The aqueduct was originally built at the end of the 18th century by Jezzar Pasha, the Ottoman ruler of Acre, but was completely rebuilt by his successor, Suleiman, in 1814.

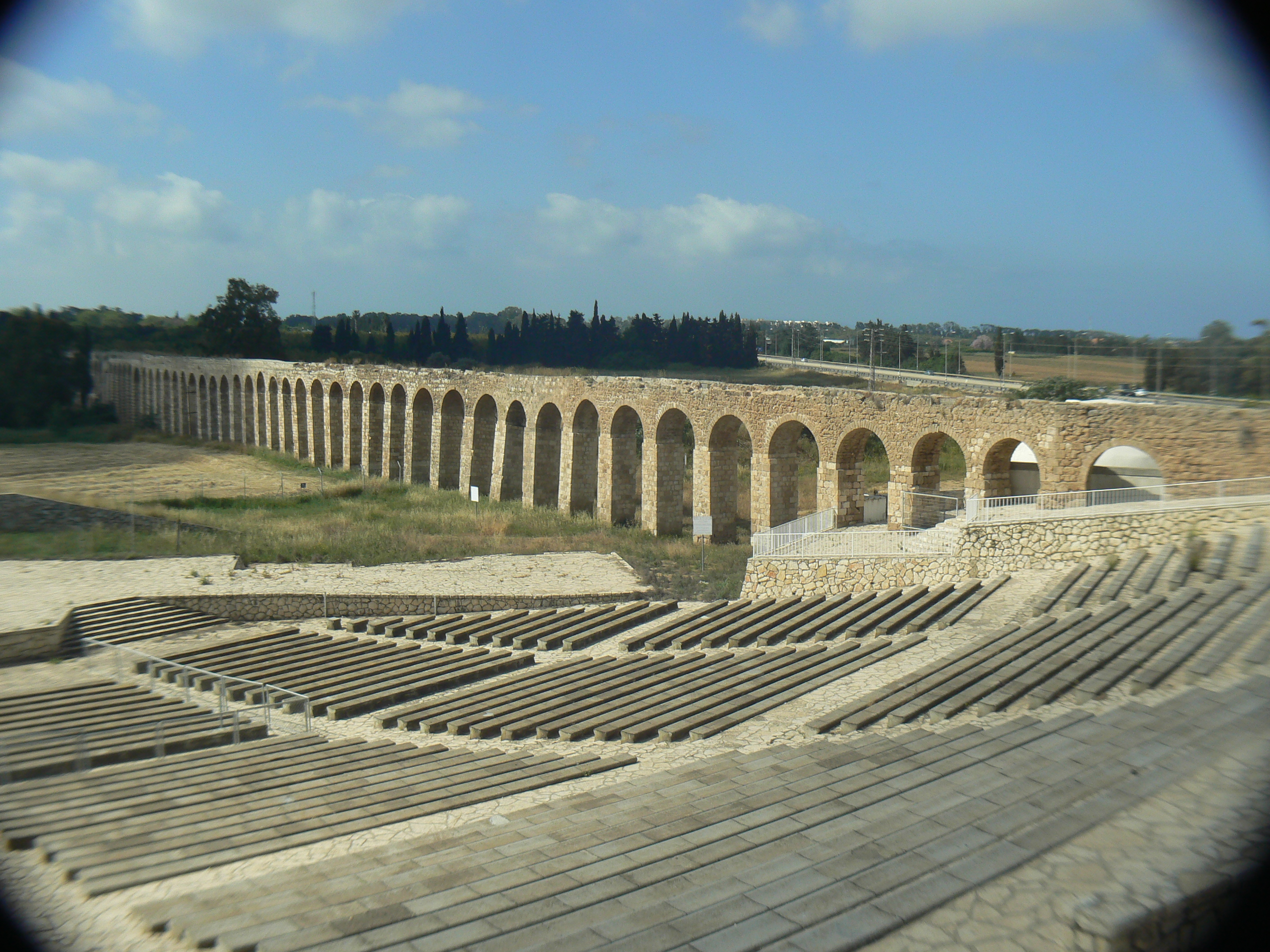
Ottoman Era Aqueduct Serving Acre

== Museum ==
The kibbutz operates the Ghetto Fighters' House, a history museum commemorating those who fought the Nazis. Adjacent to the museum is a large amphitheater used frequently for concerts, assemblies, and ceremonies hosted by the museum.

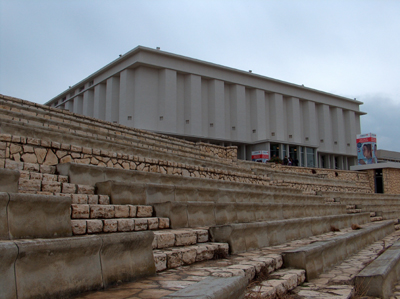
Ghetto Fighters' Museum

== Notable people ==
- Zvi Dror
- Zvika Greengold
- Zivia Lubetkin
- Yitzchak "Antek" Zukerman
- Chavka Folman Raban
