= Ben-Zvi =

Ben-Zvi is a Jewish surname of Hebrew origin, meaning "son of Zvi", and may refer to:

- David Ben-Zvi (born 1974), Israeli-American mathematician
- Eva Ben-Zvi (born 1947), Lithuania-born Israeli soprano
- Rachel Yanait Ben-Zvi (1886–1979), Israeli educator, organizer and author
- Shaul Ben-Zvi, the Israeli name of Paul Shulman, former chief of the Israel Navy
- Tova Ben Zvi (1928–2020), Israeli singer
- Yitzhak Ben-Zvi (1884–1963), President of Israel
- Zeev Ben-Zvi (1904–1952), Israeli sculptor

== See also ==
- Tsvi, Tsvia, Tzvi, Tzvia, Zvi, Tzvika/Zvika, Tsvi-Hirsh, Ben-Zvi, David-Zvi
