= Tzvi Hersh Friedlander =

As of 13 May 2011, Rabbi Tzvi Hersh Friedlander was the Liske Hasidic rebbe. He is the brother of the Uhniv (Hivniv) rebbe, author of Chasdei Avraham, a work on visiting the sick in Halacha. His father was Rav Yosef Friedlander, the author of the Tzvi V’Chammid on Torah and the Jewish holidays and a great-grandchild of the Ach Pri Tevuah of Liska. He is the author of the Chamudei Tzvi. He became rebbe in 1971, after the death of his father.

Rabbi Friedlander is also a descendant of Maharsha, as well as Rabbis Judah Loew ben Bezalel, David HaLevi Segal, Joel Sirkis, Isaiah Horowitz, and Naphtali Cohen.

Photos of Rabbi Friedlander are often published in the Jewish Connection, a weekly newspaper serving the Orthodox Jews of New York.
