= Zvi Chalamish =

Israeli real estate advisor

- צבי חלמיש
- Education: B.A. in Economics and Accounting, Hebrew University of Jerusalem; M.B.A. in Finance and Accounting, Hebrew University of Jerusalem; Special program in International Business and Finance, New York University
- Known for: CEO of ASHRA
- Children: 3
- Military career
- Branch: Israel Defense Forces
- Rank: Captain

Chief Fiscal Officer for the Western Hemisphere
- In office 2005–2010

Senior Deputy Accountant General
- In office 2000–2005

Zvi Chalamish (Hebrew: צבי חלמיש) is an Israeli real estate and industrial operations financial advisor and a public speaker. Chalamish led numerous key positions at the Government of Israel, including chief fiscal officer for the Western Hemisphere (2005–2010) and senior deputy accountant general (2000–2005). In 2010-2015, Chalamish was employed as the CEO of Ashra, The Israel Export Insurance Corp. (2010–2013), and as CEO and partner of GSE Analytical Research and Investment Advisors, part of the Giza Singer Even group (2014–2015).

== Career ==
Between 2014 and 2015, Chalamish was CEO of GSE Analytical Research and Investment Advisors, part of the Giza Singer Even group, Israel’s largest financial advisory and investment banking firm.

From 2010 to 2013, Chalamish was the CEO of ASHRA (The Israel Export Insurance Corp. Ltd.), a company fully owned by the Government of Israel, that encourages Israeli exports by providing insurance to medium-and-long-term export credit transactions as well as investments abroad. Under Chalamish's management of three years, Ashra was reported to have produced a record of over $1bn of policies, as well as expand its business to China and Africa.

Chalamish has 15 years of experience representing the Ministry of Finance in a wide range of executive positions. Most recently he served as Israel’s consul and chief fiscal officer for the Western Hemisphere (2005–2010). He was responsible for raising foreign currency for the State of Israel in international markets through bond and loan guarantee offerings. He also oversaw the State of Israel Bonds (Development Corporation of Israel) activities and fundraising initiatives worldwide and was the key liaison to the American investment banking community and financial institutions. In addition, Chalamish was in charge of the budget for the Israel Economic Mission and its seven regional offices in North and South America.

Prior to his diplomatic appointment in the U.S., Chalamish served for five years (2000–2005) as deputy accountant general for the Ministry of Finance. Chalamish also managed infrastructure projects such as the private finance initiatives (PFI) and the Built Operate Transfer (BOT).

From 1997 to 2000, while at the Ministry of Finance, he also served first as comptroller for the Ministry of Immigrant Absorption and then as comptroller for the Lands Authority Management. From 1992 to 1997, he was the supervisor and then manager of the audit department for the Ministry of Finance's accountant general.

During his tenure with the Ministry of Finance, Chalamish was the Chairman of the $400 million Israel Engineers Fund (2004-2005).

Since, 2016 Zvi has been the Managing Partner of Aulder Capital, a vertically integrated Real Estate Investment group based out of New York City.

== Education ==
Chalamish holds a B.A. in economics and accounting (1990–1993) and an M.B.A. in finance and accounting (1993–1995) from the Hebrew University of Jerusalem. In 2009, he completed a special program at New York University in international business and finance. He is also a C.P.A. During his tour of duty in the Israel Defense Forces, he rose to the rank of captain and was second-in-command at his military base. Chalamish is married with three children.

== Public speaking ==
Chalamish is a public speaker and was also a lecturer at the Hebrew University. Chalamish lectures about the Israel Economy, its development from a social-economy to an open market economy, and its breakthrough to international markets. In one of his Princeton lectures, Chalamish was quoted, "A few weeks ago, an economist called Israel 'the land of milk and startups'". Chalamish was also a guest at the Bloomberg News, speaking about investments in Israel. Chalamish is a frequent speaker at the Milken Institute.
