= Erdőbénye =

- Flag Coat of arms

- Location of Erdőbénye in Hungary
- Coordinates: 48°16′5.59″N 21°21′22.00″E
- Country: Hungary
- Region: Northern Hungary
- County: Borsod-Abaúj-Zemplén
- Subregion: Tokaji
- Rank: Village

Area
  - Total: 45.80 km^{2} (17.68 sq mi)
- Time zone: UTC+1 (CET)
  - Summer (DST): UTC+2 (CEST)
- Postal code: 3932
- Area code: +36 47
- Website: http://erdobenye.hu/

The village Erdőbénye has around 1000 inhabitants and is located 20 km from the town of Tokaj in Northern Hungary. It lies in a valley surrounded by mountains and vineyards, in the middle of the wine-region ‘Tokaj-Hegyalja’, in Borsod-Abauj-Zemplen County. The village is one of the centres for wine-production in this region. There are more cellars in the village, where the regional wines can be tasted. As the old saying tells us: “Good wine, like Tokaj Aszu, needs a good wine-cask too…“, which is why the profession of cooper has a long tradition in this region. The coopers of Erdőbénye are the only ones in the world who have preserved the tradition of the dance of the coopers, which has been handed down from father to son, and which they perform every summer at the “Festival of Coopers.”

This region attracts not only “lovers of wine”, but also “lovers of nature”. Because of clear air and low pollution, this region is a climatic health resort and is a centre for taking excursions. A valley called ‘Aranyosi-völgy’ in the nature conservation area near the village is a paradise for tourists and bikers.

In the towns of Boldogkőváralja, Sárospatak, Szerencs, Fűzer, Regéc, castles and castle ruins stand as testament to the rich history of the area. The two rivers, Tisza and Bodrog meet here. River Bodrog is home to different kinds of water-sports. Hunting and adventurous pursuits happen in the forests of Zemplén Mountains.

Concerts of the Zemplen Cultural Festival, ‘Zemplén Művészeti Napok’, are held in the Calvinist Church of Erdőbénye.

At one point the leader of the local Jewish population was Rabbi Chaim Friedlander, author of the homiletic "Tal Chaim". He was the son-in-law of Rabbi Tzvi Hirsh of Liska (alternative name for Olaszliszka), and when his father-in-law died, Rabbi Chaim Friedlander took over his father-in-law's seat in Liska. See Liske (Hasidic dynasty)

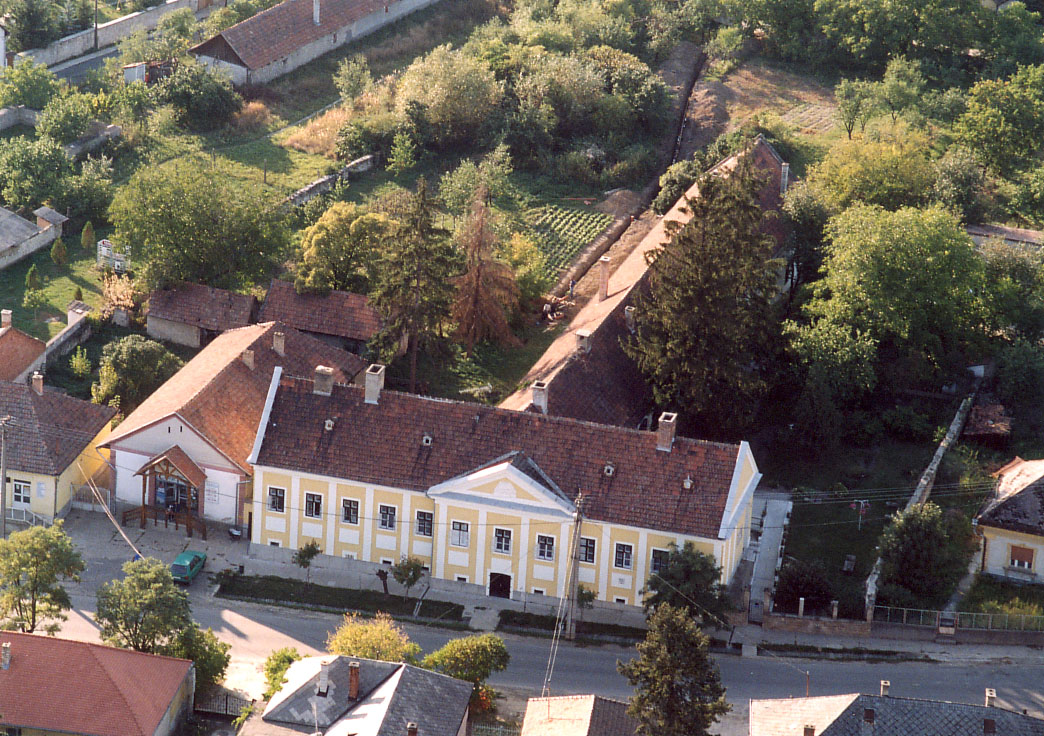
Erdőbénye - Palace from above
