= Tova Ben Zvi =

Israeli singer and Holocaust survivor (1928–2020)

Tova Ben Zvi טובה בן-צבי
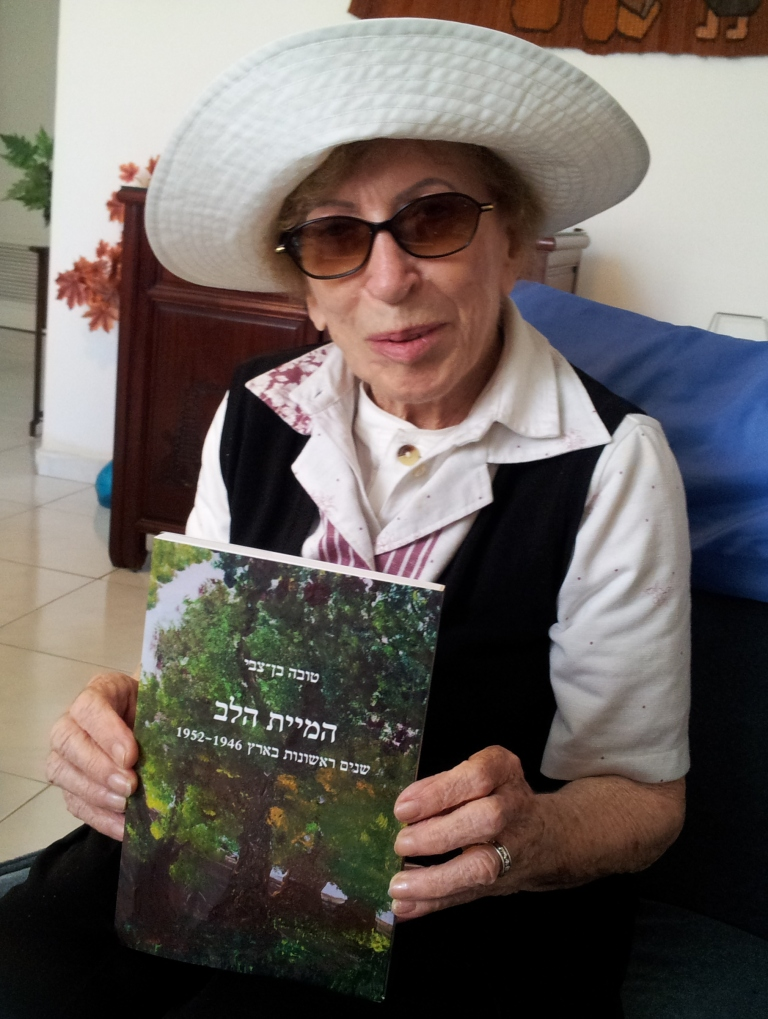
- טובה בן-צבי (Tova Ben Zvi)

Background information
- Born: 1928; Łódź, Poland
- Origin: Israel
- Died: 16 September 2020 (aged 91–92)
- Genres: Folk music
- Occupation: Singer
- Years active: 1959–2020
- Awards: Człowiek Pojednania (Man of Reconciliation) by the Polish Council of Christians and Jews

Tova Ben Zvi (Hebrew: טובה בן-צבי; 1928 – 16 September 2020) was an Israeli singer and a survivor of the Holocaust.

== Life and career ==
Ben Zvi was born in 1928 in Łódź, where she lived in the ghetto. Her father was a Jewish cantor. After the ghetto began to be emptied, she was sent to Auschwitz. Later she would find out that she was the only member of her family to survive the Holocaust. After World War II ended, she went to study literature at the University of Jerusalem. Ben Zvi released her first album in 1959. She sings folk music in Yiddish and many of her songs are about reconciliation.

In 2009, Świat Tovy, a Polish documentary about her life, was released. The thirty-minute film was directed by Michał Bukojemski. Ben Zvi was awarded the title of Człowiek Pojednania (Man of Reconciliation) by the Polish Council of Christians and Jews.

== Death ==
Ben Zvi died on 16 September 2020.
