= Tsvi Hirsh Bonhardt =

German-born Polish rabbi

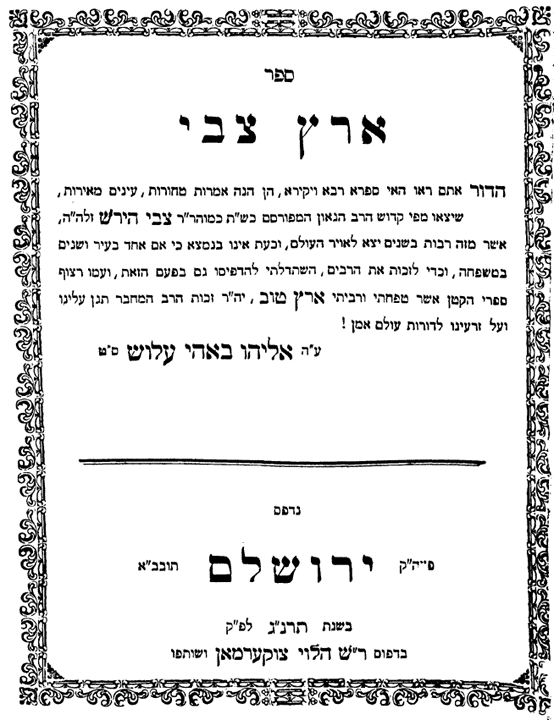
Cover of ‘Eretz Zvi’ book of sermons by Rabbi Zvi Hirsch of Widislav

Rabbi Tsvi Hirsh Bonhardt (c. 1745–1810), also known as the Maggid of Voydislav, was an 18th-century German-born Polish preacher and rabbi.

== Biography ==
R. Tsvi Hirsh Bonhardt was born in Germany, to a rabbinic family. His father, R. Yehudah Leib Bonhardt, was a prominent rabbi and scholar.

In his youth, R. Tsvi Hirsh studied at the leading Yeshivot in Germany, later immigrating to Voydislav, Poland for economic reasons. R. Tsvi Hirsh married Sarah, the daughter of R. Betsalel ha-Levi of Zhovkve (died 1802), who in part was a descendant of R. Yoel Sirkis (1561–1640). Even after immigrating to Poland, R. Tsvi Hirsh was known to have fervently held on to his German identity. He dressed in contemporary German fashion and gave most of his sermons in German, rather than Yiddish or Polish.

=== Relationship with the Hasidic community ===
Though not Hasidic, R. Tsvi Hirsh had a close personal relationship with many of the early Hasidic tsaddikim such as R. David Biderman of Lelov (1746–1814), R. Yisrael Hopstein of Kozhenits (1737–1814) and R. Moshe Leib of Sasov (1745–1807).

Hasidic literature recalls how on one of R. Tsvi Hirsh's lengthy trips across Poland, he ran into R. David of Lelov, who told R. Tsvi Hirsh he was on his way to Voydislav. R. Tsvi asked R. David if he could deliver his family three rubles which R. Tsvi had saved. R. David agreed and when he reached R. Tsvi's house in Voydislav, he was greeted by R. Tsvi's daughter, who was physically disabled. R. David gave her the three rubles and as he was leaving he said to her "zei gezunt" (a Yiddish interjection used when departing meaning "be well"). Very soon after, R. Tsvi's daughter reportedly had a miraculous recovery. It was this daughter who later married R. Yehoshua Leib Goldschmidt of Breslau.

=== Philosophical influence ===
R. Tsvi Hirsh favoured the simple interpretation of rabbinic texts (peshat) and studied medieval Jewish philosophy. He published two compilations of his collected sermons, “Asara L'me'a” published in 1801 and “Erertz Tzvi” published in 1786, both of which were widely received in Poland, with the latter reviving an approbation from the famous R. Yehezkel Landau of Prague (1713–1793).

R. Tsvi Hirsh is however best remembered as the father of famed Hasidic tsadik, R. Simcha Bunim Bonhardt (1765–1827), who was the second Peshischa Rebbe and was succeeded by his son R. Avraham Moshe Bonhardt (1800–1829). Many rationalist aspects of R. Simcha Bunim's thought are attributed to R. Tsvi Hirsh who is considered to have been a traditional rational pietist.
