= Zebi Hirsch Bialeh =

Ẓebi Hirsch Bialeh

Personal life
- Born: c. 1670 Lemberg, Galicia, Polish–Lithuanian Commonwealth
- Died: September 25, 1748 Halberstadt, Prussia, Holy Roman Empire

Religious life
- Religion: Judaism

Ẓebi Hirsch ben Naphtali Herz Bialeh (Hebrew: צבי הירש בן נפתלי הירץ ביאלה; c. 1670–September 25, 1748), also known as Hirsch Ḥarif (הירש חריף, "the sharp"), was a rabbi and Talmudist.

== Biography ==
Ẓebi Hirsch Bialeh was born around 1670 in Lemberg, Galicia. He served as rabbi of Biała, and then ran a yeshiva in his hometown. In 1718, he was appointed as chief rabbi of the affluent Jewish community in Halberstadt. Among his many pupils were Elhanan Ashkenazi, Isaiah Berlin, and Meir Barbi.

While Bialeh refused to publish his ḥiddushim, he left behind several manuscripts, which remained in private collections in Halberstadt. His approbations also appear in works authored by his students and colleagues. In his writings and speeches, Bialeh was critical of the prevalent overuse of pilpul.

Bialeh's sons were Solomon Dob Berush, rabbi of Glogau; Naphtali Herz, rabbi of Dubno; Abraham, rabbi of Rawitsch; Samuel, assistant rabbi at Halberstadt; and Simḥah Dessau, rabbi at Dessau.
