= Zvika Frank =

Dutch-Israeli dancer (born 1948)

- צביקה פרנק
- Citizenship: Netherlands, (Israel) israel
- Occupations: Dance and Movement,
- Known for: dance-movement therapist

Zvika Frank (Hebrew: צביקה פרנק; born 1948) is a Dutch-Israeli dancer, movement educator, university lecturer, and dance movement therapist. In the American Dance Therapy Association, he is registered as a dance therapist (BC-DMT). He is specialized in trauma treatments, depression, obsessive–compulsive disorder, phobias, child sexual abuse, addiction, psychosomatic problems, interpersonal problems, and many more. As a dance therapist, Frank has been living in China since 2012. In Chinese media, his name is popularly known and transcribed as Zīwéikǎ·fúlánkè (茲維卡•弗蘭克).

== Biography ==
Frank was born in the Netherlands in 1948. In 1951, he came to Israel. He started studying Israeli folk dance at the age of 7. In 1978, Frank went to the United States to study dance therapy as a registered dance therapist.

== Career ==
Frank started his career at Delta Psychiatric Centre, Rotterdam, Netherlands, one of the largest psychiatric hospitals in the Netherlands, where he was a teacher for 27 years. He is a steering committee member of the International Dance Therapy Master Program at the Rotterdam Dance Academy. He is also a member of the Dutch Action Psychotherapist.

In 2006, Frank co-operated with Chinese psychological institutions for the first time to open a dance therapy workshop in Mainland China, which has drawn great attention from the industry. Since then, he has been promoting dance therapy in China, and giving workshops on a combination of DMT and therapy. In 2011, he was awarded the Outstanding Achievement Award from American Dance Therapy Association, making him the first non-American dance therapist awarded by the association. He not only introduced dance therapy from the United States to the Netherlands, but also trained many young dance therapists. He also introduced dance therapy to China. He gave lecture on dance psychotherapy and trained many students up in many institutions, including Peking University, Zhejiang University School of Management, Putian University and more. He adopted an interdisciplinary approach that combines interactive communication analysis with dance movement therapy. The program has been introduced as a unique treatment model worldwide.

== Bibliography ==
- Frank, Zvika (1997). "Dance and Expressive Movement Therapy: An Effective Treatment for a Sexually Abused Man". American Journal of Dance Therapy. 19 (1): 45–61. doi:10.1023/A:1022323401222.

== See also ==
- Mind-body intervention
- Body psychotherapy
- Dance science
- Neuroscience
