= Zebi Hirsch Sundeles =

Polish Jewish scholar

Ẓebi Hirsch ben Enoch Moses Sundeles (Note: Also Sundel (Hebrew: זונדל, romanized: Zundel).) (Hebrew: צבי הירש בן חנוך משה זונדלש, romanized: Tzvi Hirsh ben Ḥanokh Mosheh Zundeles; fl. 16th century) was a Polish Jewish scholar.

== Work ==
He published the following works: Tefillot mi-Kol ha-Shanah (Lublin, 1571; Kraków, 1606), in collaboration with Koppelmann, and consisting of the Jewish daily prayers, with a commentary; the Maḥzor (Lublin, 1579; Kraków, 1597; Wilmersdorf, 1673), containing the Jewish festival prayers according to the Polish, Bohemian, and Moravian rituals, with a commentary on the same; Seliḥot (Kraków, 1584; Prague, 1587; Lublin, 1643), consisting of a collection of prayers for atonement according to the Polish ritual, together with a commentary composed by his father-in-law, Mordecai Mardos, and edited by Sundeles; and Yoẓerot (Kraków, 1592), written in collaboration with Koppelmann, and containing the prayers ordained for the different Sabbaths, together with a commentary thereupon.
