= Zvi Ofer =

- צבי עופר
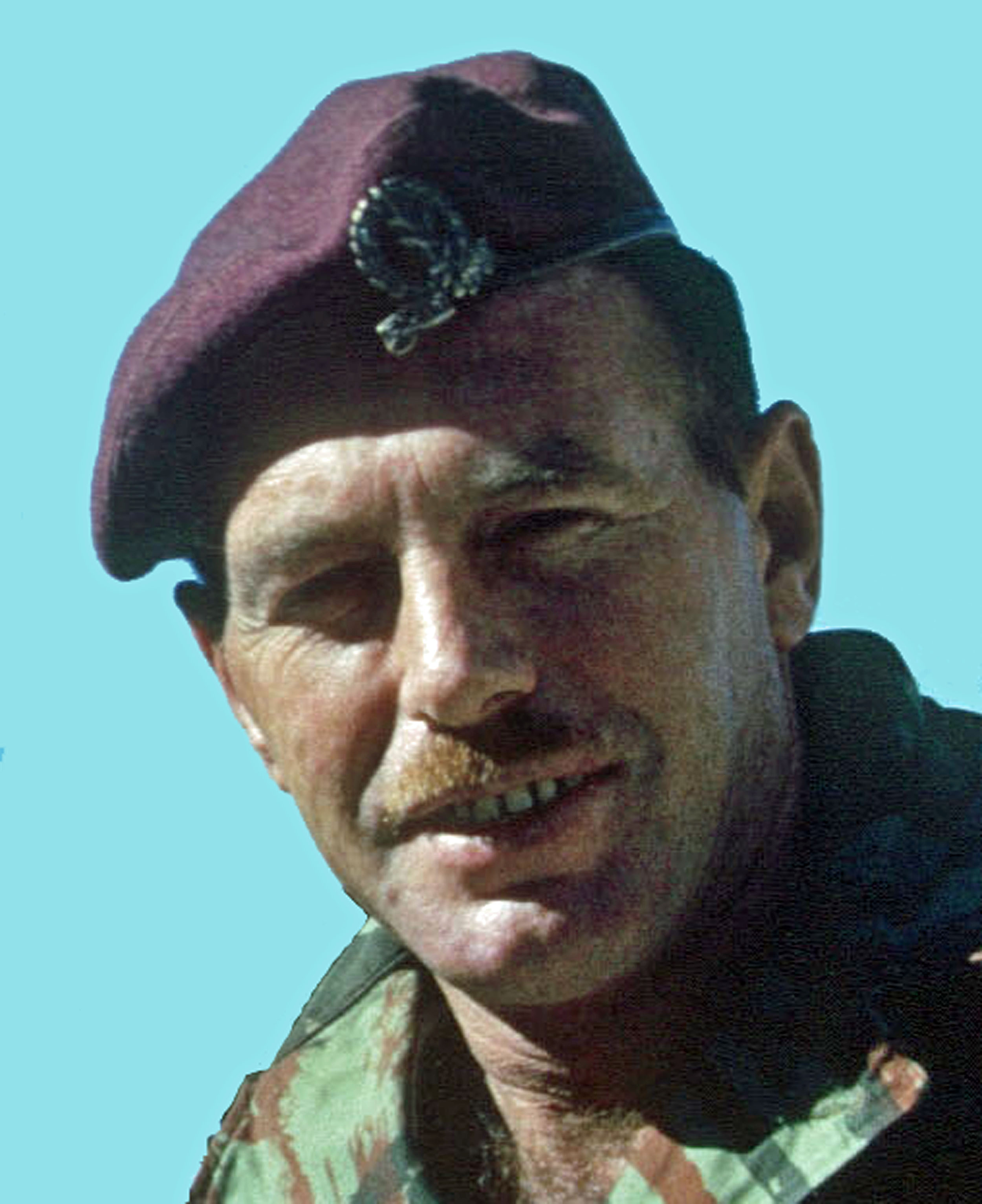
- Born: February 22, 1932; Petah Tikva
- Died: December 20, 1968 (aged 36); Wadi Qelt, West Bank
- Military career
- Allegiance: Israel
- Branch: Israel Defense Forces
- Service years: 1948–1949; 1952-1968
- Rank: Lieutenant Colonel
- Nickname: Gingi (Red)
- Commands: Paratroop platoon commander; Commander, Sayeret Golani; Commander, Sayeret Haruv; Military Governor of Hebron and Shechem
- Conflicts: 1948 Arab–Israeli War; Sinai War; Six-Day War
- Awards: Medal of Valor

Zvi "Zvika" Ofer (Hebrew: צבי עופר; 1932–1968) was an Israeli soldier and the commander of the Israel Defense Forces Haruv Reconnaissance Unit, and recipient of the Israeli Medal of Valor for the 1962 Nuqeib operation in Syria. In 1967, he served as the military commander of Hebron and Nablus.

== Early life and the 1948 war ==
One was born in Petah Tikva to parents who had moved to British Mandatory Palestine during the Third Aliyah. His parents were among the founders of the settlement Kfar Azar. As a youth, Ofer joined the Haganah. He initially delivered Haganah newspapers to its subscribers, hung pro-Haganah posters in the middle of the night and oiled the guns belonging to the settlement. At sixteen, he left school and joined the Palmach, the elite strike force of the Haganah. He fought in the 1948 Arab-Israeli War, and participated in Operation Danny in which the Arab occupied towns of Lod and Ramle fell to Jewish forces. His military talents did not go unnoticed and he was handpicked for officer’s training. In the midst of his training, he learned that his Palmach unit was gearing up for Operation Yoav, an offensive in the Negev region. He left officer’s school to join his unit in time for the offensive. By the end of the war, he attained the rank of sergeant while his classmates had not yet enlisted in the army.

Ofer was married and had four children.

== Border wars, the Suez war and the Six-Day War ==
Following the 1948 Arab–Israeli War, he returned to civilian life but reenlisted in 1952. He was first assigned to a unit that tracked down Arab guerrilla infiltrators. Later, he joined the paratroops and partook in many reprisal operations of the 1950s. During Operation Kadesh, Ofer commanded a paratroop platoon that took part in the Battle for the Mitla Pass. Later, forces under his command took part in the taking of the Sharm el-Sheikh military base, thus clearing the way for Israeli shipping to pass through the Gulf of Aqaba, which had hitherto been blocked by Egyptian cannon.

In the early 1960s, he was given a command position within Sayeret Golani. His unit became known as "The Flying Tiger". In 1962, Syrian artillery on the Golan Heights bombarded Israeli civilian targets, including fishermen on the Sea of Galilee. The Israel Defense Forces felt that retaliation was warranted and chose a Syrian military target near the village of Nuqeib. Ofer’s unit played a central role in operation Snunit (Swallow) which resulted in the destruction of the chosen targets. During the operation, Ofer charged the Syrian pillboxes while firing his machinegun and throwing grenades. He yelled at them, “surrender; you don’t stand a chance,” before silencing them with antitank fire. During the Six-Day War, his was one of the few battalions that did not see combat as his assigned objectives, Bethlehem and Hebron, fell without a shot. Following the Six-Day War, Ofer was appointed military governor of Hebron and Shechem and was lauded for his performance in those roles.

== Last battle and death ==
Ofer wanted to rejoin a combat unit and after a request, was assigned command of the Haruv Reconnaissance Unit. The unit's primary responsibility was to conduct special reconnaissance and scout along Israel's border with Jordan in order to combat Arab guerrilla infiltration in the Jordan Valley. In 1968, Ofer was killed in action in Wadi Qelt, west of Jericho, while in pursuit of militants who had crossed the Jordan River. The Arab guerrillas were on their way to attack civilian targets and the force led by Ofer intercepted them before they could reach their target. Ofer was the sole Israeli fatality in the engagement, which also resulted in the killing of two guerrillas and the capture of six others along with a large weapons cache.

At his graveside, the Commanding Officer of the Central Command, General Rehavam Ze'evi said of Zvi Ofer, "the figure Zvika, the country boy, the youth in the Palmach, the scout, the commander, and the instructor, will remain engraved in our hearts".

The IDF Camp Ofer and Ofer Prison, founded in December 1968, are named after him.
