= Gregor Belkovsky =

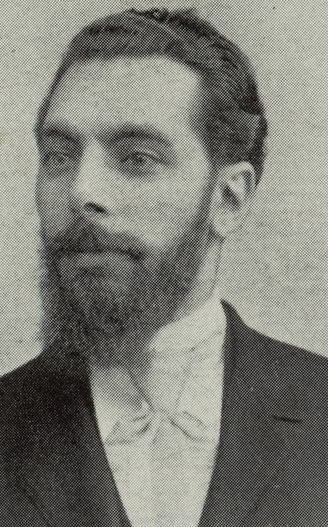
Gregor Belkovsky in 1903

Zvi Hirsch Gregor Belkovsky (Russian: Григорий Александрович Белковский; 1865, Odessa, Russian Empire – 1948, Tel Aviv) was a jurist, political economist, one of the leaders of the Bulgarian Zionists and an organizer for the first Zionist Congress.

== Early life ==
Belkovsky was born in 1865 in Odessa, in the Kherson Governorate of the Russian Empire (present-day Ukraine) to Saul Sender, who was a poor laborer. He studied in a Jewish elementary school and was a gifted student. He later studied law at University of Odessa and specialized in Roman and criminal law. During his student years he was active in Jewish National movement in Odessa. Belkovsky won a medal for his work and after graduation he was offered a professorship, which he rejected because it was conditional on conversion to Christianity. He did not receive a license to practice law because he remained Jewish.

=== Bulgaria ===
In 1892 while he was in Germany, Belkovsky met one of his former professors from University of Odessa which accompanied him to meet Bulgarian minister of Education Georgi Zhivkov. Zhivkov offered Belkovsky a professorship in University of Sofia and Bulgarian government headed by Stefan Stambolov approved this position immediately. This was unprecedented because Belkovsky was both foreign and Jewish. Upon his arrival in Sofia, he started learning Bulgarian language. Belkovsky published several articles on Roman law in Bulgarian and at the same time he was promoting Zionism in Bulgarian. Belkovsky was the leader of the Zionist movement in Bulgaria and met with Joseph Marco Baruch several times.

Belkovsky was very close to Ferdinand I of Bulgaria. In 1896 central Zionist Committee was established in Sofia and Belkovsky became its leader. On June 17, 1896 Theodor Herzl arrived in Bulgaria and met with Belkovsky.

=== Further activities ===
From 1891 even prior to establishment of World Zionist Organization Belkovsky was in contact with prominent Zionists. In September 1893 prominent European Zionists created a preliminary conference in Vienna which Belkovsky attended.

He was one of the extreme opponents of the Uganda plan and rejected any settlement of Jews outside Eretz Israel. After the October Revolution Belkovsky continued Zionist activities and was appointed chairman of Central Zionist Committee in Russia.

In 1924 Belkovsky was arrested in the Soviet Union and was sentenced to exile in Siberia. However, his sentence was reduced to deportation and he was deported to Mandatory Palestine. In Palestine he continued to practice law.

== Death ==
Belkovsky died in Tel Aviv, in Mandatory Palestine on 11 January 1948 and was buried in a large funeral. He had one daughter.
