= Zvika Greengold =

Israeli soldier and politician (born 1952)

- צביקה גרינגולד
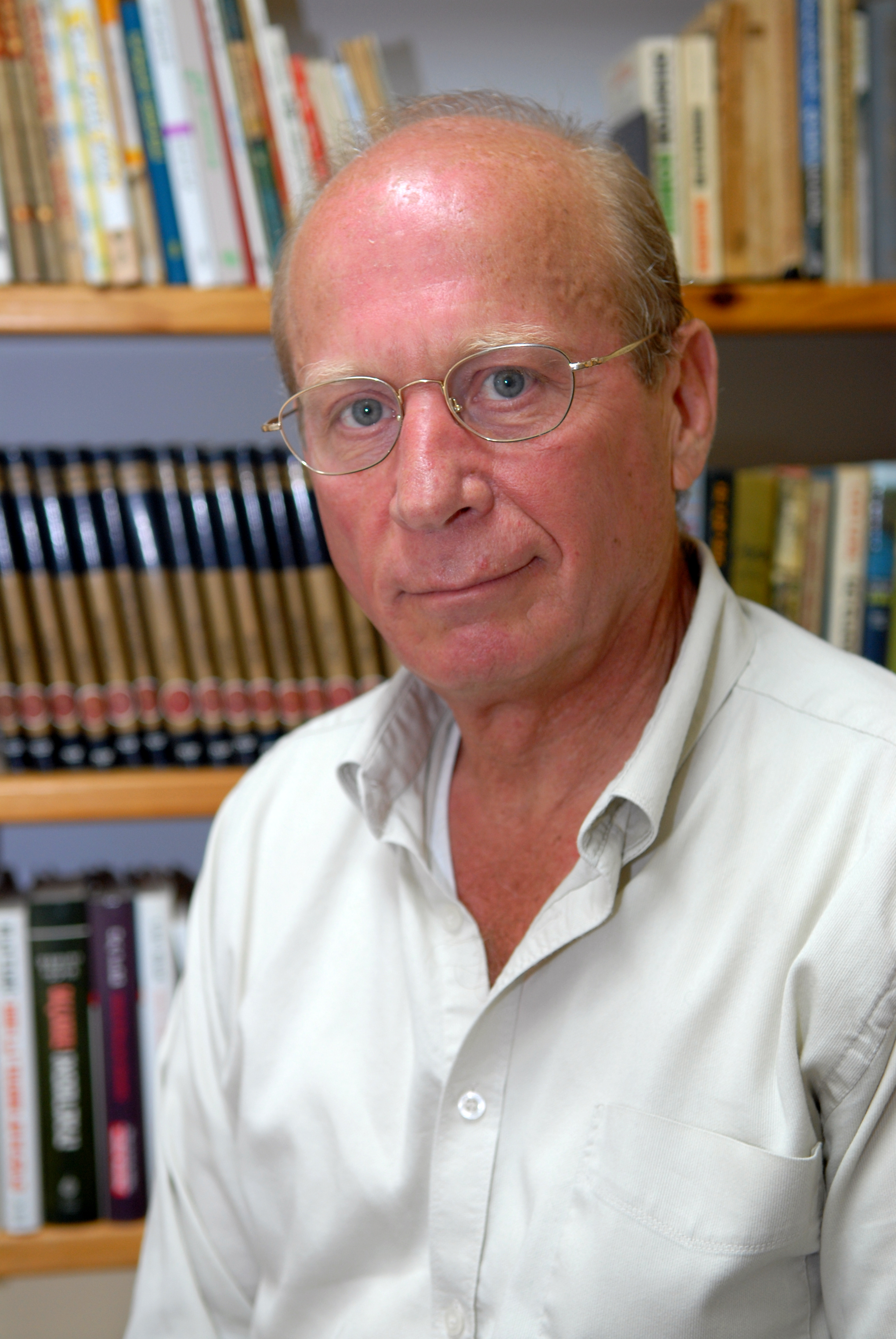
- Born: 10 February 1952 (age 74); Lohamey HaGeta'ot, Galilee, Israel
- Military career
- Allegiance: Israel
- Branch: Israel Defense Forces
- Service years: 1972–1974
- Rank: Captain
- Unit: 188th Armor Brigade
- Conflicts: Yom Kippur War
- Awards: Medal of Valor
- Other work: Politician, businessman

Zvi Greengold (Hebrew: צבי "צביקה" גרינגולד; born 10 February 1952) is a former Israel Defense Forces (IDF) officer who fought during the 1973 Yom Kippur War as a tank commander. He is one of only eight people who fought in the war to be awarded the Medal of Valor, the nation's highest medal for heroism. He is a former mayor of Ofakim.

== Biography ==
Zvi ("Zvika") Greengold was born and raised on Kibbutz Lohamey HaGeta'ot (English: Kibbutz of the Ghetto Fighters, founded by Holocaust survivors of underground and partisan combat against the Nazis). His parents were among the founders of the kibbutz.

== Military career ==
On 6 October 1973, Yom Kippur day, twenty-one-year-old Lieutenant Greengold was home on leave when Egypt and Syria launched a coordinated surprise attack on two fronts. He was not attached to any unit as he was about to take a course for company commanders. Once he realized war had broken out, he hitchhiked to Nafekh, a command center and important crossroads in the Golan Heights, where he initially helped with the wounded, as no tanks were available. When two damaged Centurion tanks were repaired, Greengold was put in charge of them and, at 2100 hours, was ordered to take hastily assembled scratch crews down the Tapline Road.

Greengold's Koah Zvika (Zvika Force) spotted tanks belonging to the Syrian Army's 51st Independent Tank Brigade, which had broken through the line and were advancing unopposed northwest along the road to Nafekh. Greengold's two tanks engaged the opposing T-55s, with Greengold destroying six. His tank was damaged, so he switched tanks and sent his original tank back for repairs.

Then he spotted the advancing 452nd Tank Battalion. He engaged the enemy, taking advantage of the darkness and moving constantly to fool the Syrians into thinking the opposition was stronger than it was. Greengold destroyed or damaged ten enemy armoured vehicles before the confused Syrians withdrew, believing they were facing a sizable force. Even Greengold's superiors were deceived; as the fighting wore on, he did not dare report how weak he actually was over the radio for fear it would be intercepted. He could only hint "the situation isn't good". At a time when Zvika Force consisted of only one tank, Colonel Yitzhak Ben-Shoham, a brigade commander, assumed it to be "of at least company strength".

Greengold fought for the next 20 hours, sometimes alone, sometimes in conjunction with other tanks, and displayed an uncanny knack for showing up time and time again at the critical moment to tip the scales of a skirmish. He had to change vehicles "half a dozen times" as his tanks were knocked out. At 2230, he was joined by eight or ten tanks under the command of Lieutenant Colonel Uzi Mor. After being briefed by Greengold, Mor ordered an advance. Most of his tanks were knocked out by a Syrian force; Mor was seriously wounded, Greengold's driver was killed, and Greengold's uniform caught on fire. Greengold took charge of one undamaged tank, while the other two carried away the wounded.

Greengold recalled in a 2015 Jerusalem Post article that at sunrise, he was part of a force of 14 tanks that engaged an entire Syrian armored division, "made up of some 100 tanks and 40 armored personnel carriers." When Nafekh itself came under attack from a fresh force of T-62s, he and others rushed over to bolster the defense. In a lull in the fighting, an exhausted Greengold got out of his latest tank and dropped to the ground, murmuring, "I can't anymore."

Afterward, he claimed 20 enemy tanks destroyed; another estimate places his tally at 60.

In 2016, Brigadier General (res.) Yair Nafshi told Israeli TV that then-reporter for Bamahane Renen Schorr concocted the story of Greengold single-handedly destroying a large number of Syrian tanks. Schorr flatly denied Nafshi's claim, and Greengold characterized the assertion as a "blood libel" motivated by "a mixture of jealousy, evil and psychological problems."

== Post-war activities ==
Until 2008, he lived in a Galilee hilltop village. He was one of the founders of the vegetarian food company Tivall and the managing director of Frutarom chemical company.

In 2008, he was elected mayor of the Israeli city of Ofakim.
