= Zvi Hirsch Grodzinsky =

American rabbi

Rabbi Zvi Hirsch Grodzinsky (1857? in Minsk, Belarus – 1947 in Omaha, Nebraska, United States) was an American Orthodox rabbi and author. His English name was Henry.

== Biography ==
Zvi Hirsch studied under his famous second cousin Rabbi Hayyim Ozer Grodzinsky. In 1891, he accepted the rabbinate of the two Orthodox synagogues in Omaha. Zvi Hirsch was on par with the elite Jewish Law scholars of his day. He chose, however, to serve as rabbi in a religiously underdeveloped city so that he can pursue his scholarly endeavors. He was a composer of literature on Halakhic topics.

The name Zvi Hirsch is a bilingual tautological name in Yiddish. It means literally "deer-deer" and is traceable back to the Hebrew word צבי tsvi "deer" and the German word Hirsch "deer".

== Published works ==
- Mikveh Yisrael (deals with the laws of Mikveh)
- Mikra'ei Kodesh (deals with the laws of the Public Torah Readings, especially on Mondays and Thursdays)
- Beis Hayayin (A volume dealing with the laws of Yayin Nesech)
- Milei deBrakhot (deals with topics in the Talmudic tractate of Brachos)
- Likutei Tzvi ("Gedolei Acharonim" on S.A. - O.C.)

== Sources ==
- Goldman, Yosef. Hebrew Printing in America, 1735-1926, A History and Annotated Bibliography (YGBooks 2006). ISBN 1-59975-685-4.
- Jewish Life in Omaha and Lincoln: A Photographic History, By Oliver B. Pollak
