= Zebi Hirsch Scherschewski =

- Born: 1840; Pinsk
- Died: 1909 (aged 68–69)
- Writing career
- Pen name: יעבץ ישוע שר עסק
- Language: Hebrew, Yiddish
- Movement: Haskalah

Zebi Hirsch ha-Kohen Scherschewski (Yiddish: צבי הירש הכהן שערשעווסקי, romanized: Tsvi Hirsh ha-Kohen Shershevski; 1840–1909) was a Russian Hebrew writer.

== Biography ==
Scherschewski was born at Pinsk in 1840. While still a boy he studied Hebrew grammar and archaeology without a teacher. After serving as secretary of the Jewish community of Pinsk, he went to the Crimea, where, at Melitopol, he entered the service of a merchant named Seidener. Later he became assistant editor of Aleksander Zederbaum's Ha-Melitz. During the Russo-Turkish war he followed the Russian army as a sutler; and after a second short stay with his former employer, Seidener, he settled in 1883 at Rostov-on-the-Don, where he opened a bookstore.

In addition to numerous contributions to current Hebrew journals, Scherschewski wrote Boser Avot (Odessa, 1877), a satirical poem on the neglect of the education of Jewish children in Russia, and Iyyun Sifrut (Vilna, 1881), on the development of Jewish literature and its significance as a cultural element for raising the Jews to a higher moral standing. His notes to the Midrash Shoḥer Tov are printed in Padua's Warsaw edition of that midrash, and his rhymed parodies are to be found in Keneset Yisrael.

== Partial bibliography ==
- Boser Avot. Odessa: L. Nitsche. 1877.
- Iyyun Sifrut. Vilna: Yehuda Leib Matz. 1881.
- "Ben-Mishle". Keneset Yisrael. 1: 401–408.
- "Ben-Mishle". Keneset Yisrael. 2: 2–6.
