= Joel Sirkis =

Ashkenazi posek and halakhist

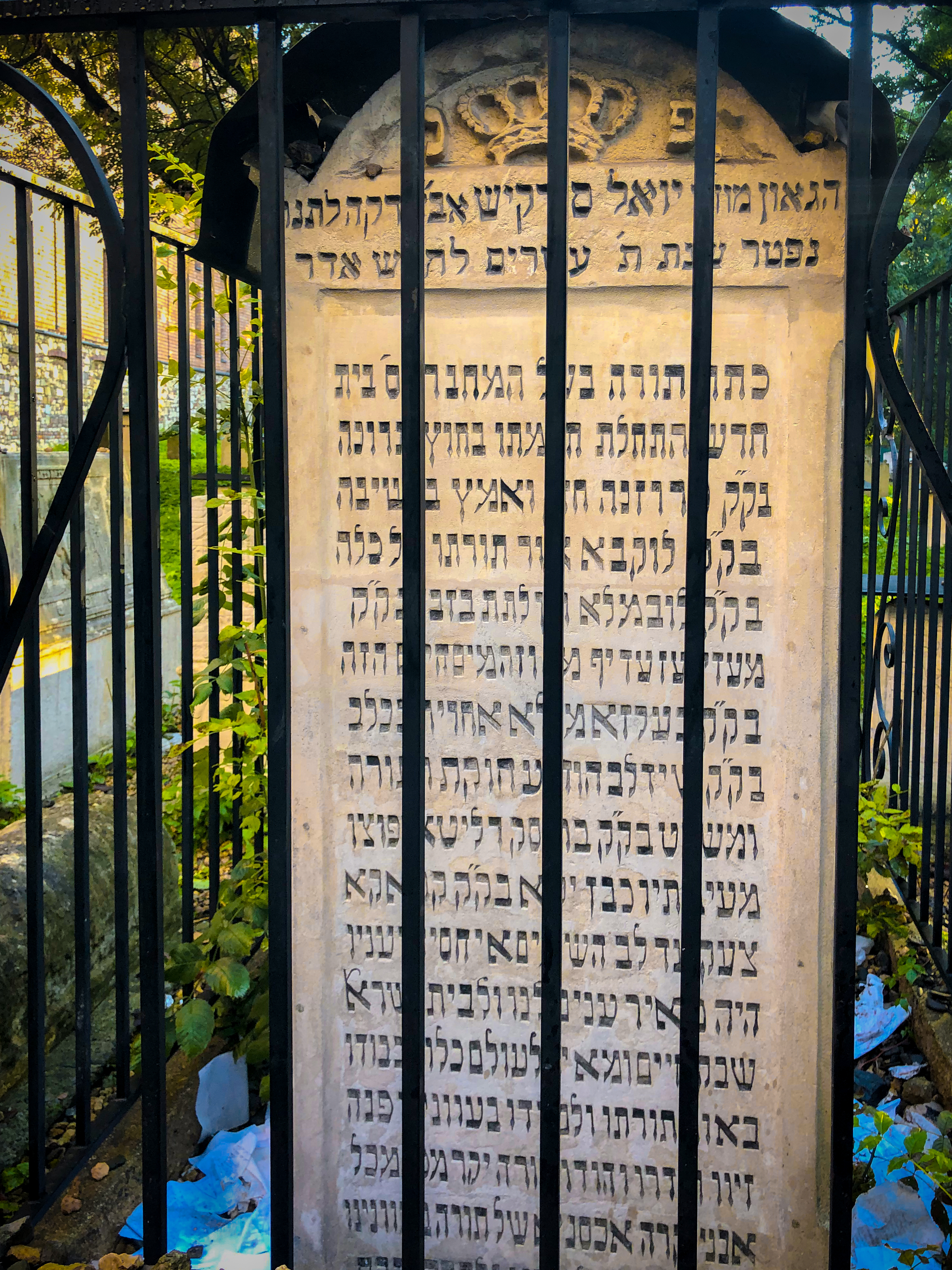
- Grave of Joel Sirkis
- Title: HaBach (הב׳׳ח)

Personal life
- Born: Joel Sirkes c. 1561 Lublin, Poland
- Died: March 14, 1640 Kraków, Poland
- Buried: Remah Cemetery
- Spouse: Baila
- Children: Esther Sirkis, Samuel Tzvi Hersch Sirkis, Rivka Sirkis, Judab Leib Sirkis, Menachem Sirkis, Kalisch Sirkis, Abraham Sirkis
- Parents: Samuel Sirkis (father); Sarah Jaffe (mother)
- Dynasty: Jaffe

Religious life
- Religion: Judaism
- Main work: Bayit Chadash, Teshuvot ha-Bach
- Dynasty: Jaffe

Joel ben Samuel Sirkis (Hebrew: רבי יואל בן שמואל סירקיש; born 1561 - March 14, 1640) also known as the Bach (an abbreviation of his magnum opus BAyit CHadash), was a prominent Ashkenazi posek and halakhist, who lived in Central Europe and held rabbinical positions in Belz, Brest-Litovsk and Kraków, and is considered to be one of the greatest Talmudic scholars of Poland. He is known for his liberal rulings in his responsa in which he challenges the rabbinic status quo.

== Biography ==
Born in Lublin, Poland in 1561, his father Samuel Sirkis was a rabbi in Lublin and his mother Sarah Jaffe was a member of the Jaffe family, through her father Moses Jaffe of Kraków, making Mordecai Jaffe, the Bach's second cousin. At age fourteen he went to the yeshiva of Naftali Zvi Hirsch Schor, a leading student of Moses Isserles. After remaining there for some time he went to Brest-Litovsk, where he attended the yeshiva of Rabbi Phoebus. While still in his youth, he was invited to the rabbinate of Pruzhany. He later occupied the rabbinates of Lukow, Lublin, Medzyboz, Belz, Szydlowka, and Brest-Litovsk, finally settling in Kraków in 1619, where he married Bella, the daughter of Abraham of Lwow and was appointed Av Bet Din of Kraków and head of the yeshivah. Many of his students became leading rabbis in Poland, the most famous being his son-in-law, David ben Samuel ha-Levi, as well as Gershon Ashkenazi and Menachem Mendel Krochmal. In 1631 he wrote his magnum opus, Bayit Ḥadash (lit "new house"), a critical and comprehensive commentary on the Arba'ah Turim of Jacob ben Asher, in which he traced each law to its Talmudic source and followed its subsequent development through successive generations of interpretation. His work received the approval of the greatest rabbinic scholars of his time, even those outside of Poland. The Bach was also an adherent of Kabbalah, yet he rejected kabbalistic practices that were contrary to the halakhah. He was also critical of those who relied solely on the Shulchan Aruch for halachic decisions, rather than on the Talmud and the Geonim.

The Bach's responsum provides a concise overview of the social and economic conditions of Polish Jewry, as well as the relationship between Jews and non-Jews in early 17th century Poland. One of his responsa, in particular, was censored by the Christian authorities because the work addresses the case of a Jew who was martyred for allegedly stealing a small statue of Jesus. The Polish authorities also demanded the surrender of another Jew accused of receiving the stolen item from the martyr, and threatened to exterminate all the Jews of Kalisz if they refused to surrender the individual. To this, the Bach suggests that the community was permitted to surrender the individual if he was proven to have taken the stolen statue from the martyr. The Bach also discusses cases of apostasy from Judaism, in which he states: “It is common knowledge at present that the majority of apostates have converted solely out of their lust for robbery, promiscuity, and consuming forbidden foods in public.” Both his responsum and the Bayit Ḥadash display the Bach's liberal attitude towards Judaism and his deprecation of undue religious stringency, one stating: “He who wishes to be stringent, let him be stringent for himself only.”

The Bach allowed the acceptance of emoluments and special privileges by rabbis in return for their services. He extended the permission to sell leavened food to a non-Jew before Passover to include the sale of the room in which such food was found. He permitted the reading of secular, non-Hebrew books on the Sabbath and liberalized certain laws to allow for the greater enjoyment of the festivals. He allowed Jewish physicians to violate the Sabbath when treating non-Jewish patients. He permitted church melodies in the synagogue if they were universal in appeal. He excused people sensitive to colds or those lacking warm clothing from the obligation to dwell in booths during Sukkot and permitted women to dress in men's clothing during extreme weather conditions when this type of attire was more comfortable. The descendants of the Bach served prominent and important rabbinic positions all over Poland and Ukraine. His son-in-law was David HaLevi Segal, and among the Bach's descendants is the prominent Ukrainian rabbi Betzalel HaLevi of Zhovkva (1710–1802), who was the maternal grandfather of the Hasidic master, Simcha Bunim of Peshischa (1765–1827).

== Works ==
- Bayit Chadash (בית חדש) - A commentary on the Arba'ah Turim of Jacob ben Asher.
- Hagahot haBach (הגהות הב"ח) - Suggestions for textual emendations in the Talmud, Rashi, Tosafot, Rif and Rosh.
- Meshiv Nefesh (משיב נפש) - A commentary on the Book of Ruth.
- Teshuvot ha-Bach (תשובות הב׳׳ח) - The Responsum of the Bach.
- Beurei ha-Bach le-Pardes Rimmonim (ביאורי הב"ח לספר פרדס רימונים) - An explanations of passages in the Kabbalistic magnum opus of Moses ben Jacob Cordovero.
