= Margaret Herschel =

British botanical artist and hostess (1810–1884)

Lady Herschel
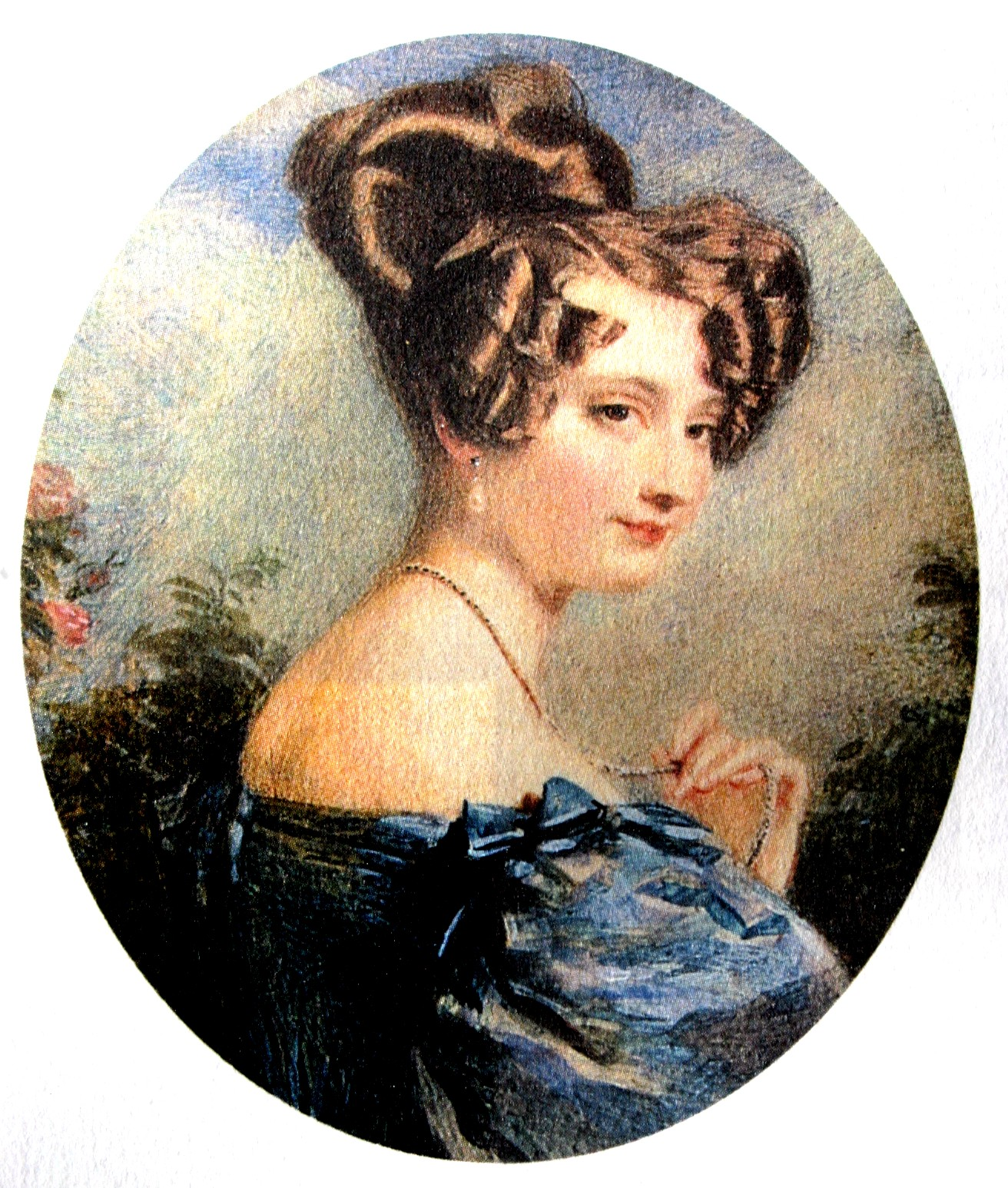
- Portrait by Alfred Edward Chalon
- Born: Margaret Brodie Stewart; 31 August 1810; Dingwall, Scotland
- Died: 3 August 1884 (aged 73); Hawkhurst, England
- Occupations: Artist; hostess
- Spouse: John Herschel

Margaret, Lady Herschel (née Brodie Stewart; 1810–1884) was a British botanical artist and hostess. While she was in Cape Colony, she and her husband made over a hundred botanical paintings of wild flowers, which they brought back to Europe for study. Her husband was one of the leading scientists of Victorian Britain.

== Life ==
Margaret Brodie Stewart was born in 1810. Her father was Alexander Stewart DD, a Scottish Presbyterian minister and Gaelic scholar.

She married Sir John Herschel on 3 March 1829 at St. Marlyebone Church in London. Through her husband she met intellectual women like the mathematician Mary Somerville, who visited Margaret and John's house regularly, and the novelist Maria Edgeworth. This led Margaret to seek out a friendship with John's aunt the astronomer Caroline Herschel, where Margaret sought to learn about Caroline's scientific career.

As her children grew older and the household had more domestic staff, Margaret spent more time studying. She studied German and algebra, and supported her husband in his work. She also ensured that both her sons and daughters received equally solid educations, although the girls were not able to go away to school at eleven or attend university like their brothers.

== Visit to Cape Colony ==
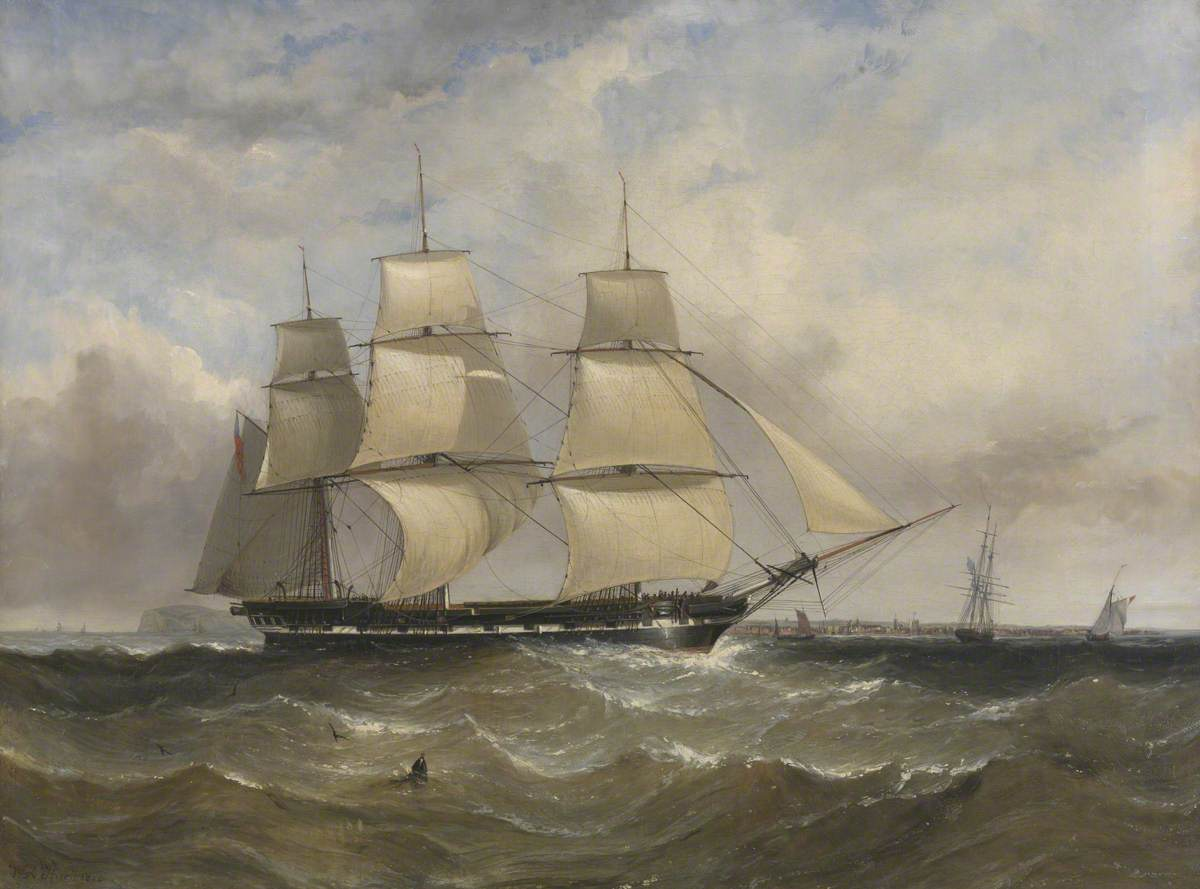
The Ship ‘Mount Stewart Elphinstone’ Offshore by William Adolphus Knell

The voyage to Cape Colony was made so that her husband could catalogue the stars, nebulae, and other objects of the southern skies. Her husband had his own inherited money and he paid £500 for passage on the S.S. Mountstuart Elphinstone. Together with their three children they departed from Portsmouth on 13 November 1833. They arrived in Cape Town on 15 January 1834 and chose to live at Feldhausen, an old estate in Claremont, a suburb of Cape Town, where her husband set up a private 21 ft (6.4 m) telescope. He collaborated with Thomas Maclear, the Astronomer Royal at the Cape of Good Hope and the two families became close friends.

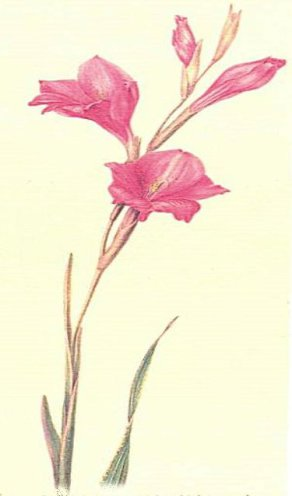
Gladiolus caryophyllaceus by Margaret & John Herschel

Herschel and her husband between 1834 and 1838 produced 131 botanical illustrations showing Cape flora. They used a camera lucida to obtained outlines of the specimens and Margaret dealt particularly with the details. Their portfolio had been intended as a personal record, and despite the lack of floral dissections in the paintings, their accuracy made them valuable. 112 of their flower studies were collected and published as Flora Herscheliana in 1996.

When HMS Beagle called at Cape Town, Captain Robert FitzRoy and the young naturalist Charles Darwin visited Herschel on 3 June 1836. Later on, Darwin would be influenced by Herschel's writings in developing his theory advanced in The Origin of Species.

They returned to England in 1838, where her husband became a baronet, of Slough in the County of Buckingham and she became Lady Margaret Herschel.

== Death and legacy ==
Lady Margaret Herschel died in 1884. Besides the posthumus publication Flora Herscheliana, some of her letters are in Trinity College and others are in the British Library.

== Private life ==
She had married her cousin John Herschel on 3 March 1829 in Edinburgh, and they had nine daughters and three sons:

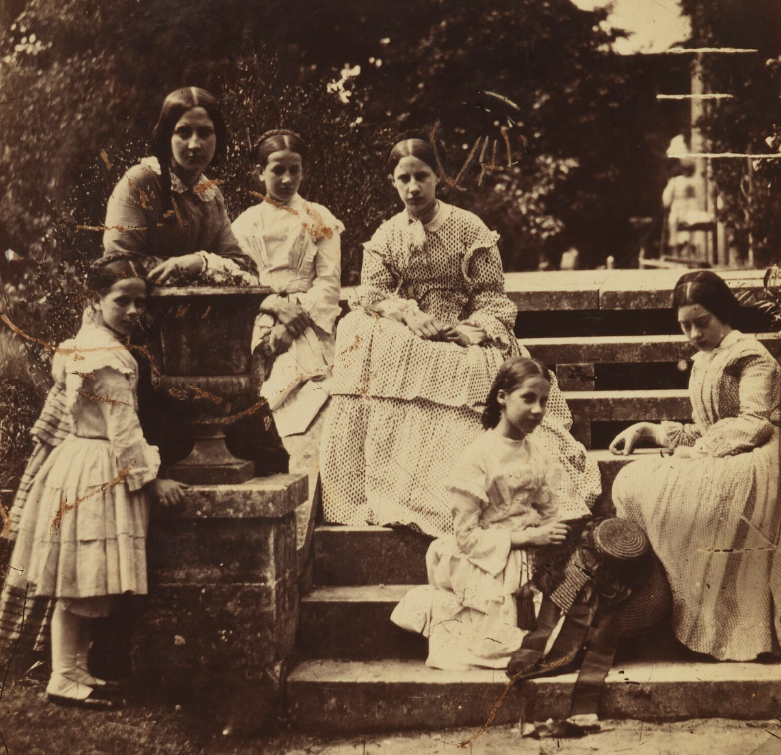
The Herschel daughters in the 1860s (from left to right): Constance Anne, Caroline Emilia Mary, Margaret Louisa, Isabella Herschel, Francisca ('Fancy'), and Matilda Rose (unknown photographer)

1. Caroline Emilia Mary Herschel (31 March 1830 – 29 January 1909), who married the soldier and politician Alexander Hamilton-Gordon
2. Isabella Herschel (5 June 1831 – 1893)
3. Sir William James Herschel, 2nd Bt. (9 January 1833 – 1917),
4. Margaret Louisa Herschel (1834–1861), an accomplished artist
5. Prof. Alexander Stewart Herschel (1836–1907), FRS, FRAS
6. Col. John Herschel FRS, FRAS, (1837–1921) surveyor
7. Maria Sophia Herschel (1839–1929) married Henry Hardcastle
8. Amelia Herschel (1841–1926) married Sir Thomas Francis Wade, diplomat and sinologist
9. Julia Herschel (1842–1933) married on 4 June 1878 to Captain (later Admiral) John Fiot Lee Pearse Maclear
10. Matilda Rose Herschel (1844–1914), a gifted artist, married William Waterfield (Indian Civil Service)
11. Francisca Herschel (1846–1932)
12. Constance Anne Herschel (1855–20 June 1939)
