= GC2 =

GC2, GC-II, or variant may refer to:

- Autopista GC-2, a highway in Gran Canaria
- NGC 7, a.k.a. GC 2, a spiral galaxy in the constellation Sculptor
- Second Geneva Convention, a.k.a. GCII, one of the Geneva Conventions
- Groupe de Chasse II (GC II), a fighter group of the French Air Force, see Groupe de Chasse
- Galactic Civilizations II: Dread Lords, a turn-based strategy game
- Ground Control II: Operation Exodus, a real-time tactics game
