= NGC 31 =

Galaxy located in the constellation Phoenix

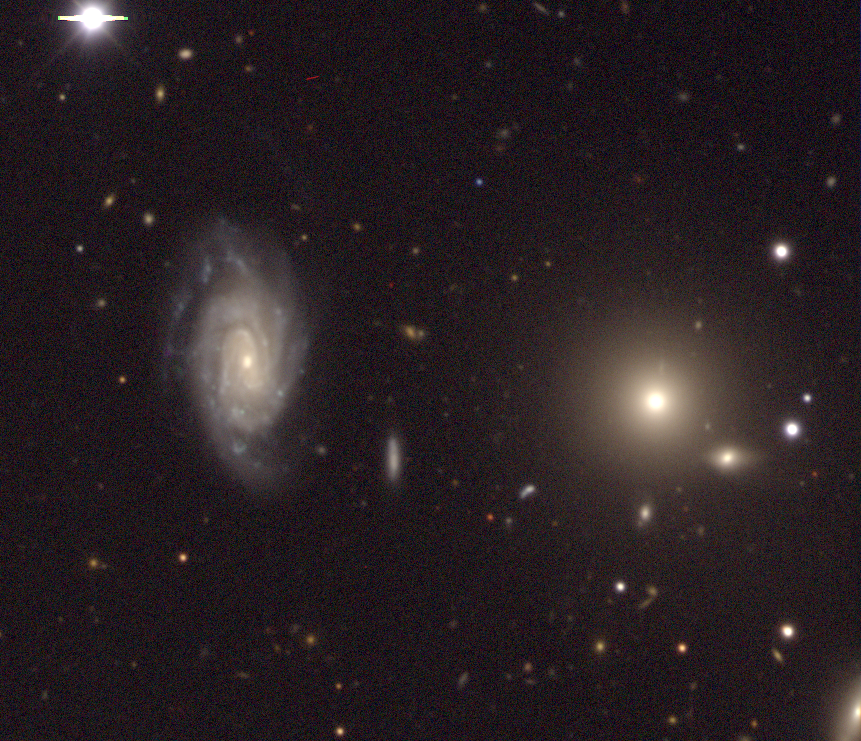
- NGC 31 is the spiral galaxy on the left. NGC 28 is the elliptical galaxy on the right. (DECam)

Observation data (J2000 epoch)
- Constellation: Phoenix
- Right ascension: 00^{h} 10^{m} 38.384^{s}
- Declination: −56° 59′ 11.41″
- Redshift: 0.03203
- Heliocentric radial velocity: 9447 km/s
- Distance: 454.3 ± 31.9 Mly (139.30 ± 9.77 Mpc)
- Apparent magnitude (B): 14.58

Characteristics
- Type: SB(rs)cd

Other designations
- PGC 751

NGC 31 is a spiral galaxy located in the constellation Phoenix. It was discovered on October 28, 1834, by the astronomer John Herschel. Its morphological type is SB(rs)cd, meaning that it is a late-type barred spiral galaxy.

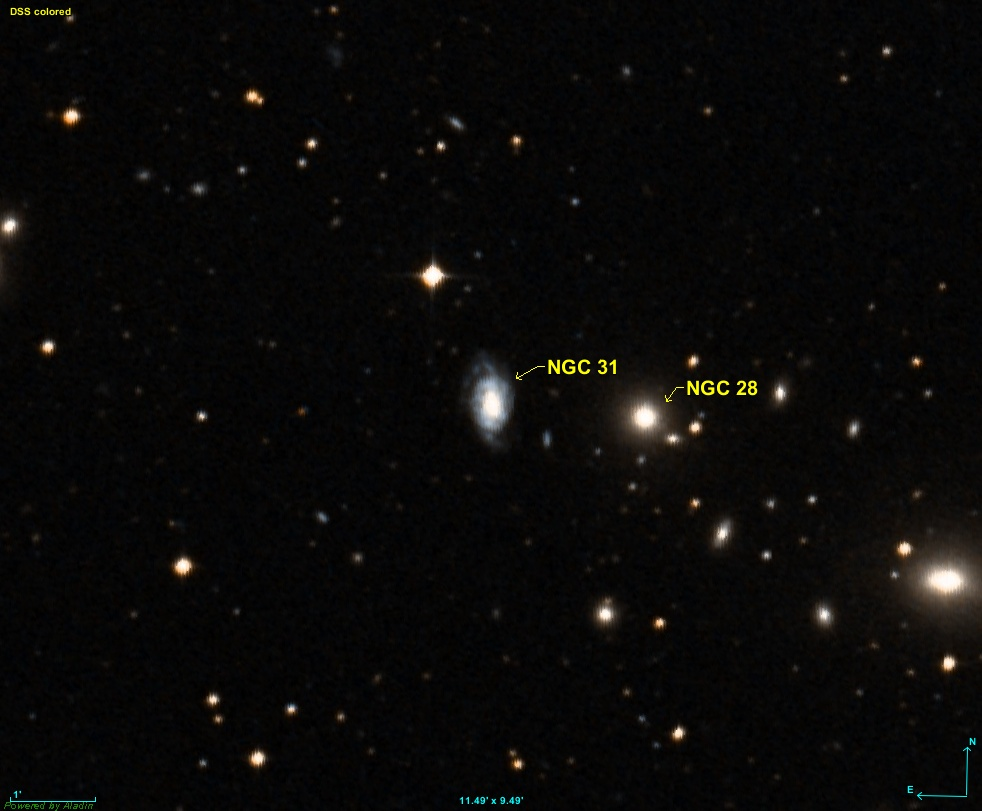
NGC 31 and surrounding galaxies
