= New General Catalogue =

Astronomical catalogue of deep sky objects

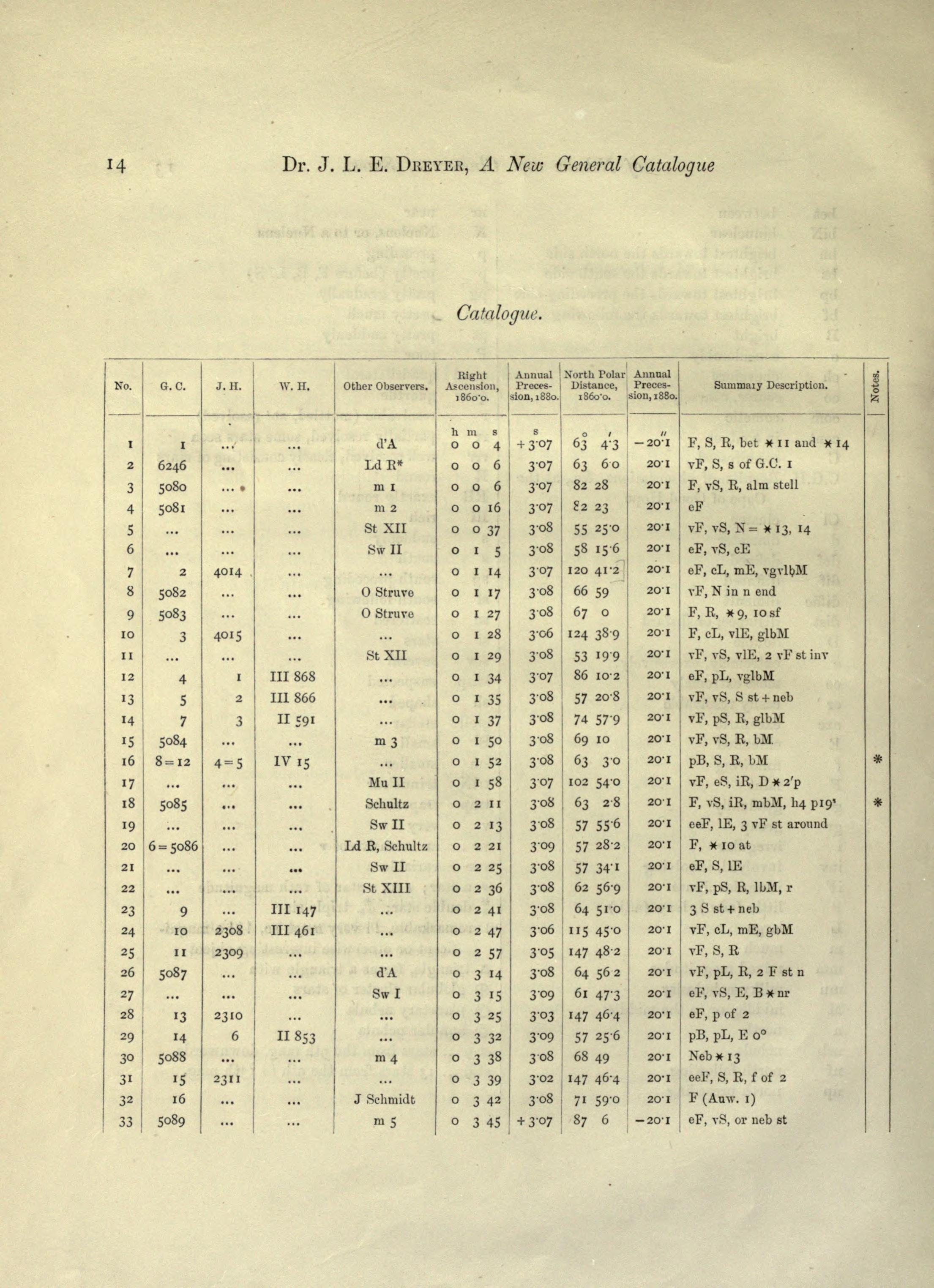
- Alternative names: NGC
- Website: vizier.u-strasbg.fr/viz-bin/VizieR?-source=VII%2F1B
- Related media on Commons

The New General Catalogue of Nebulae and Clusters of Stars (abbreviated NGC) is an astronomical catalogue of deep-sky objects compiled by John Louis Emil Dreyer in 1888. The NGC contains 7,840 objects, including galaxies, star clusters and emission nebulae. Dreyer published two supplements to the NGC in 1895 and 1908, known as the Index Catalogues (abbreviated IC), describing a further 5,386 astronomical objects. Thousands of these objects are best known by their NGC or IC numbers, which remain in widespread use.

The NGC consolidated the cataloguing work of William and Caroline Herschel, and John Herschel's General Catalogue of Nebulae and Clusters of Stars. Objects south of the celestial equator are catalogued somewhat less thoroughly, but many were included based on observation by John Herschel or James Dunlop.

The NGC contained multiple errors, but attempts to eliminate them were made by the Revised New General Catalogue (RNGC) by Jack W. Sulentic and William G. Tifft in 1973, NGC2000.0 by Roger W. Sinnott in 1988, and the NGC/IC Project in 1993. A Revised New General Catalogue and Index Catalogue (abbreviated as RNGC/IC) was compiled in 2009 by Wolfgang Steinicke and updated in 2019 with 13,957 objects.

== Original catalogue ==
The original New General Catalogue was compiled during the 1880s by John Louis Emil Dreyer using observations from William Herschel and his son John, among others. Dreyer had already published a supplement to Herschel's General Catalogue of Nebulae and Clusters (GC), containing about 1,000 new objects. In 1886, he suggested building a second supplement to the General Catalogue, but the council of the Royal Astronomical Society asked Dreyer to compile a new version instead. This led to the publication of the New General Catalogue in the Memoirs of the Royal Astronomical Society in 1888.

Assembling the NGC was a challenge, as Dreyer had to deal with many contradictory and unclear reports made with a variety of telescopes with apertures ranging from 2 to 72 inches. While he did check some himself, the sheer number of objects meant Dreyer had to accept them as published by others for the purpose of his compilation. The catalogue contained several errors, mostly relating to position and descriptions, but Dreyer referenced the catalogue, which allowed later astronomers to review the original references and publish corrections to the original NGC. Dreyer published lists of corrections to the NGC was published at the end of the two Index Catalogues and in 1912 based on his revision of Sir William Herschel's catalogues.

== Index Catalogue ==
The first major update to the NGC is the Index Catalogue of Nebulae and Clusters of Stars (abbreviated as IC), published in two parts by Dreyer in 1895 (IC I, containing 1,529 objects) and 1908 (IC II, containing 3,857 objects). It serves as a supplement to the NGC, and contains an additional 5,386 objects, collectively known as the IC objects. It summarizes the discoveries of galaxies, clusters and nebulae between 1888 and 1907, most of them made possible by photography.

== Revised New General Catalogue ==
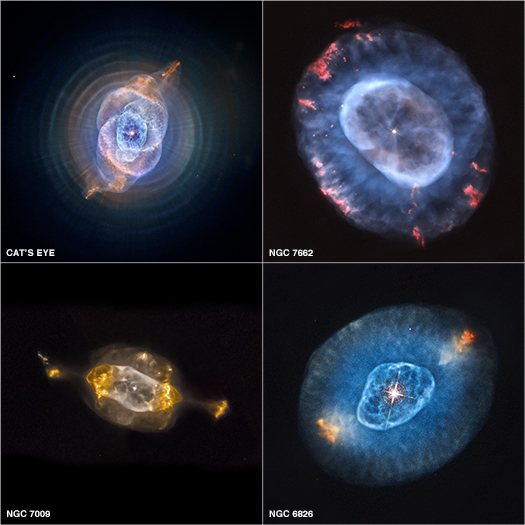
Four different planetary nebulae. Clockwise starting from the top left: NGC 6543, NGC 7662, NGC 6826, and NGC 7009.

The Revised New Catalogue of Nonstellar Astronomical Objects (abbreviated as RNGC) was compiled by Sulentic and Tifft in the early 1970s, and was published in 1973, as an update to the NGC. The work did not incorporate several previously published corrections to the NGC data (including corrections published by Dreyer himself), and introduced some new errors. For example, the well-known compact galaxy group Copeland Septet in the constellation Leo appears as non-existent in the RNGC.

Nearly 800 objects are listed as "non-existent" in the RNGC. The designation is applied to objects which are duplicate catalogue entries, those which were not detected in subsequent observations, and a number of objects catalogued as star clusters which in subsequent studies were regarded as coincidental groupings. A 1993 monograph considered the 229 star clusters called non-existent in the RNGC. They had been "misidentified or have not been located since their discovery in the 18th and 19th centuries". Five clusters were duplicates of other entries, 99 existed "in some form", and the other 124 required additional research to resolve.

As another example, reflection nebula NGC 2163 in Orion was classified "non-existent" due to a transcription error by Dreyer. Dreyer corrected his own mistake in the Index Catalogues, but the RNGC preserved the original error, and additionally reversed the sign of the declination, resulting in NGC 2163 being classified as non-existent.

=== Revised New General Catalogue and Index Catalogue ===
The Revised New General Catalogue and Index Catalogue (abbreviated as RNGC/IC) is a compilation made by Wolfgang Steinicke in 2009. It is a comprehensive and authoritative treatment of the NGC and IC catalogues. The number of objects with status of "not found" in this catalogue is 301 objects (2.3%). The brightest star in this catalogue is NGC 771 with magnitude of 4.0.

== NGC 2000.0 ==
NGC 2000.0 (also known as the Complete New General Catalog and Index Catalog of Nebulae and Star Clusters) is a 1988 compilation of the NGC and IC made by Roger W. Sinnott, using the J2000.0 coordinates. It incorporates several corrections and errata made by astronomers over the years.

== NGC/IC Project ==
The NGC/IC Project was a collaboration among professional and amateur astronomers formed by Steve Gottlieb in 1990, although Steve Gottlieb already started to observe and record NGC objects as early as 1979. Other primary team members were Harold G. Corwin Jr., Malcolm Thomson, Robert E. Erdmann and Jeffrey Corder. The project was completed by 2017. This project identified all NGC and IC objects, corrected mistakes, collected images and basic astronomical data and checked all historical data related to the objects.

== See also ==
- Messier object
- Catalogue of Nebulae and Clusters of Stars
- Astronomical catalogue
- List of astronomical catalogues
- List of NGC objects
