= NGC 28 =

Galaxy in the constellation Phoenix

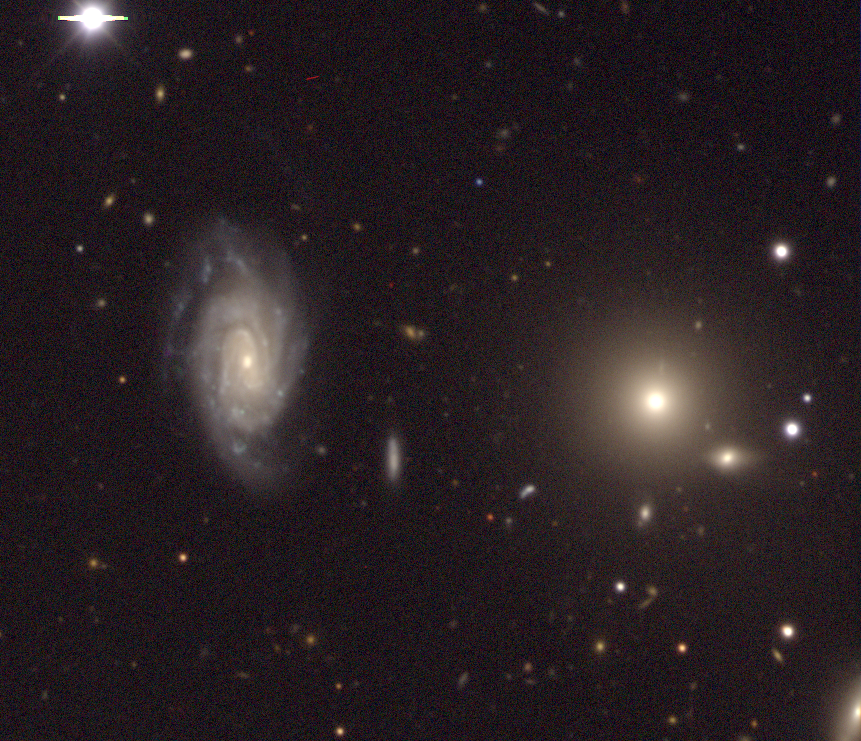
- NGC 28 is the elliptical galaxy on the right. NGC 31 is the spiral galaxy on the left. (DECam)

Observation data (J2000 epoch)
- Constellation: Phoenix
- Right ascension: 00^{h} 10^{m} 25.2^{s}
- Declination: −56° 59′ 21″
- Redshift: 0.032156
- Heliocentric radial velocity: 9640 ± 45 km/s
- Apparent magnitude (V): 15.4

Characteristics
- Type: E
- Apparent size (V): 1.5'

Other designations
- PGC 730

NGC 28 is an elliptical galaxy located in the constellation Phoenix. It was discovered on 28 October 1834 by John Herschel.
