= NGC 25 =

Galaxy in the constellation Phoenix

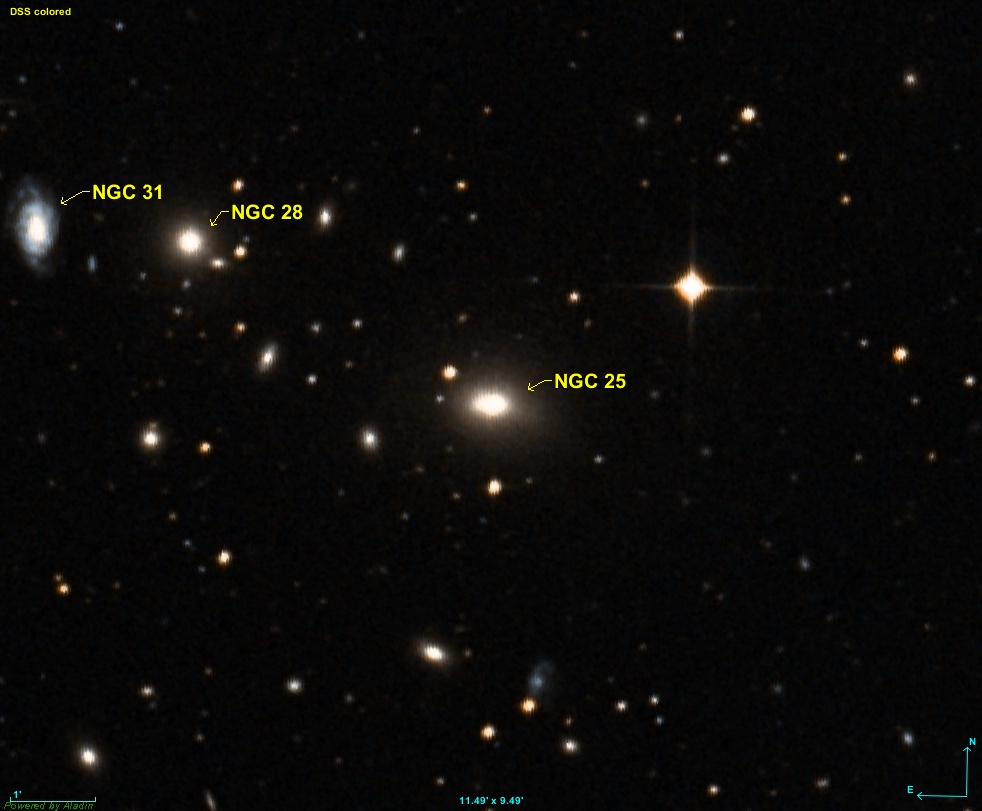
- DSS image of NGC 25

Observation data (J2000 epoch)
- Constellation: Phoenix
- Right ascension: 00^{h} 09^{m} 59.28^{s}
- Declination: −57° 01′ 15.0″
- Redshift: 0.03157
- Heliocentric radial velocity: 9465 ± 32 km/s
- Apparent magnitude (V): 13.0

Characteristics
- Type: SB0^{−}? pec
- Apparent size (V): 1.4' x 0.8'

Other designations
- PGC 706

NGC 25 is a barred lenticular galaxy situated in the constellation Phoenix. It was discovered on 28 October 1834 by John Herschel. It is the brightest cluster galaxy for Abell cluster 2731. A possible supernova was discovered in NGC 25 on 15 November 2020.

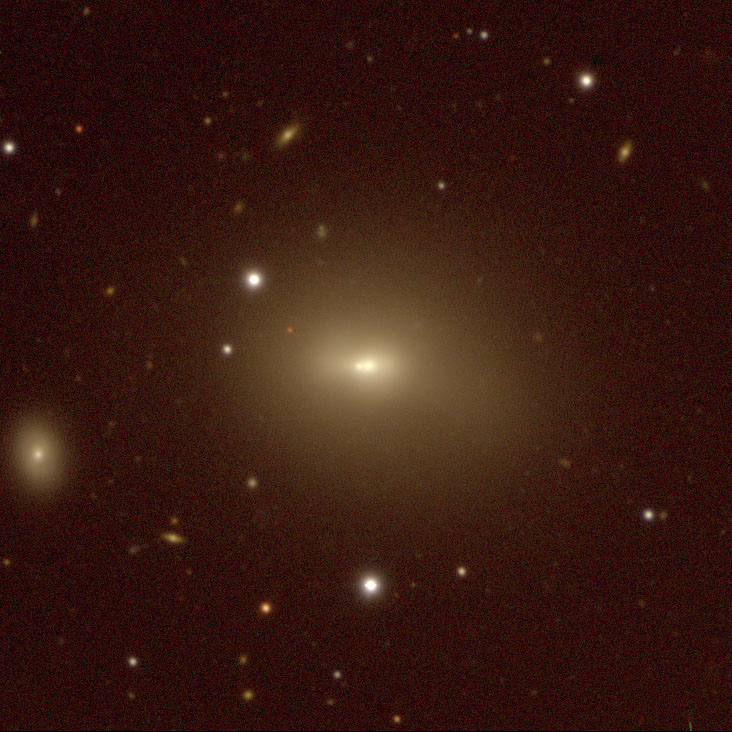
NGC 25 with DECam
