= Grove Primary School (South Africa) =

School from pre-primary to Grade 7 in Claremont, Cape Town

The Grove Primary school

Location
- Claremont, Cape Town, Western Cape, South Africa
- 33°58′58″S 18°27′37″E

Information
- Motto: Latin: Spes In Arduis (Hope in the hills)
- Established: 1885
- Principal: Candice Joshua
- Grades: R - 7
- Enrollment: 720
- Website: thegrove.co.za

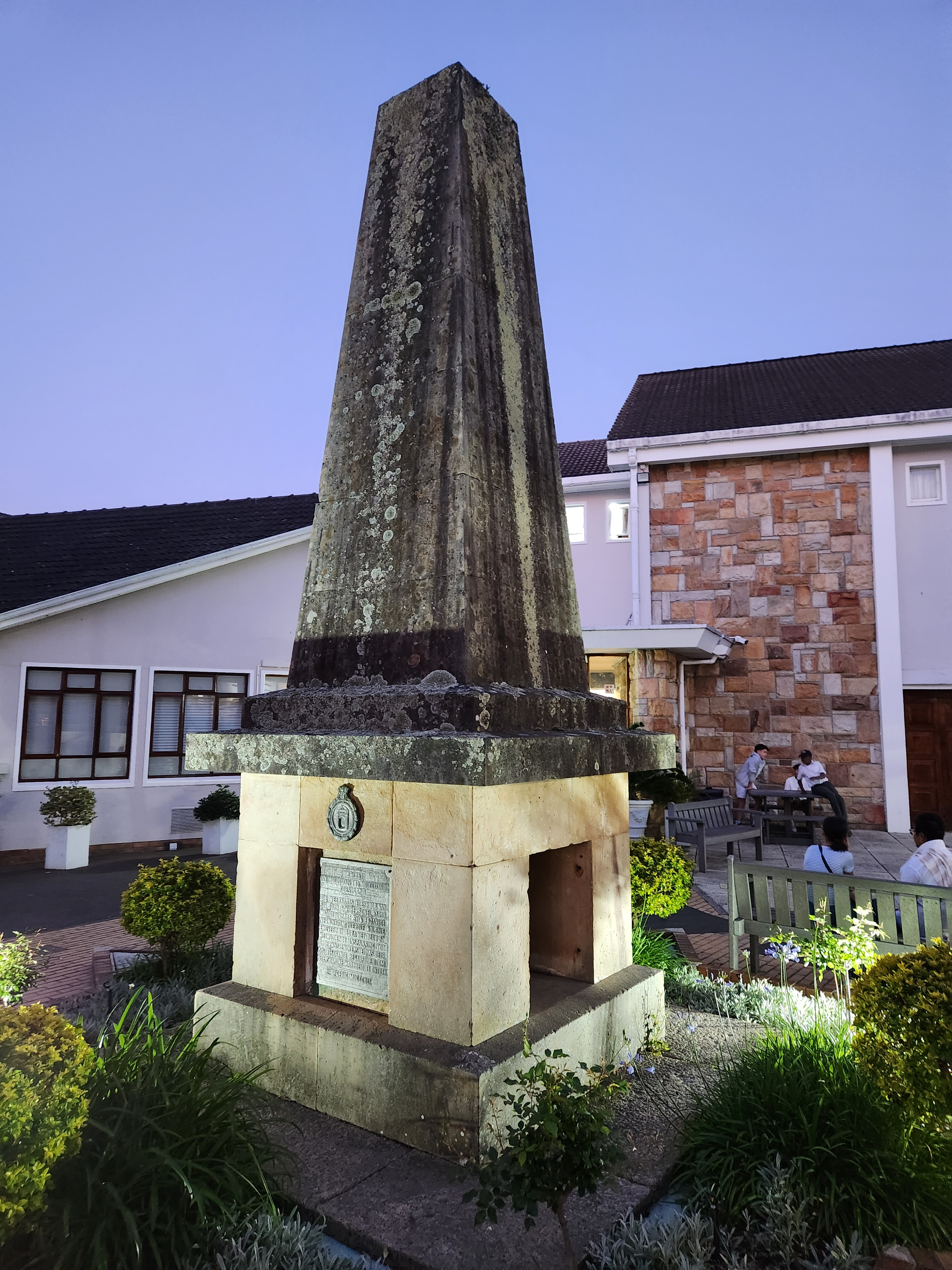
The Herschel Memorial Obelisk in central courtyard of Grove Primary School, made from granite imported from a quarry near Edinburgh, Scotland and built in 1842

The Grove Primary School is a school from pre-primary to Grade 7 in Claremont, Cape Town, Western Cape, South Africa.

There are about 720 pupils at the Grove and the school Head is Mrs Candice Joshua.

== History ==
The Grove is one of the oldest schools in South Africa and was founded in 1885 as the Feldhausen School, named after Feldhausen Estate, which was a farm prior to the founding of the school. The school is still adjacent to Feldhausen Road.

The premises contain the Sir John Frederick William Herschel obelisk, dedicated to the famous British astronomer who visited South Africa in 1833 to catalogue the stars of the southern skies, returning to Britain in 1838.

The school's first principle was Theophilus James John Beechey, serving the school from 1901 until 1923. The school celebrated its125th birthday in 2010 with musical concerts and a soccer festival, now an annual event which still runs to date.

Helen Zille, leader of the Democratic Alliance political party, started her political career while a parent at the school. She spearheaded a campaign which resulted in the school taking the government to court.

== Sports ==
Grove has one field on the grounds with another field not too far away named Lady Anne (after Lady Anne Barnard). Grove's facilities include a swimming pool, tennis courts, an AstroTurf, netball courts, a playing field, basketball court, cricket nets, a library and a computer room. Every year there is a sports day, competed between the school houses of Athens (red), Sparta (green), Troy (blue) and Rome (yellow).

Summer sports include: mini-sport, mini-cricket, cricket, swimming and tennis. Winter sports include: soccer, hockey, netball and cross-country.
