= NGC 7 =

Galaxy in the constellation Sculptor

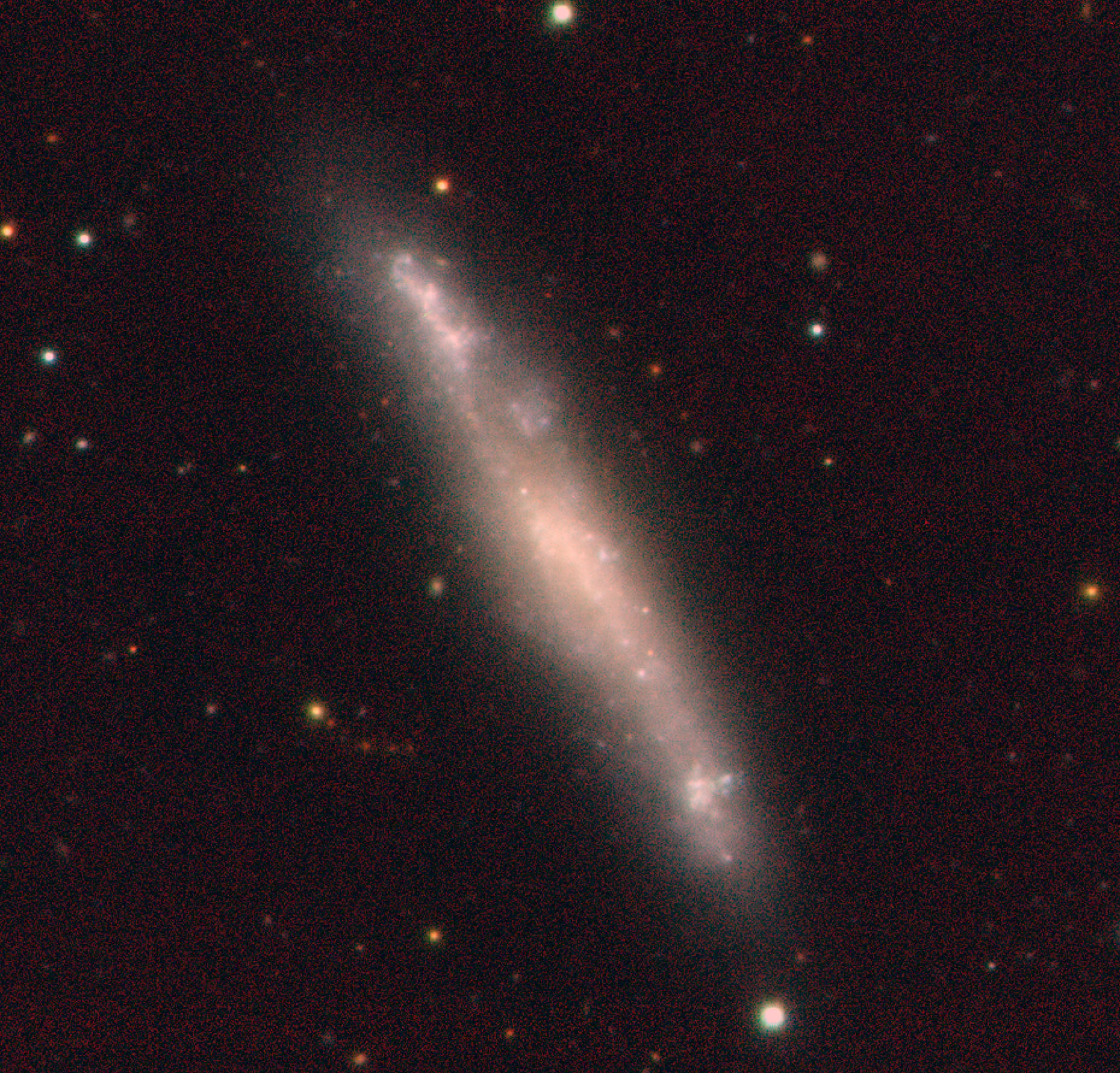
- ESO KIDS image of NGC 7

Observation data (J2000 epoch)
- Constellation: Sculptor
- Right ascension: 00^{h} 08^{m} 20.3^{s}
- Declination: −29° 55′ 01″
- Redshift: 0.004987
- Heliocentric radial velocity: 1495 ± 2 km/s
- Distance: 71.4 ± 5.2 Mly (21.9 ± 1.6 Mpc)
- Apparent magnitude (V): 13.5
- Absolute magnitude (V): −17.83

Characteristics
- Type: SBc
- Apparent size (V): 2.2′ × 0.5′

Other designations
- MCG-05-01-037, ESO 409-G022, AM 0005-301, PGC 627, h 4014, GC 2

NGC 7 is a barred spiral galaxy located in the constellation Sculptor. It was discovered by English astronomer John Herschel in 1834, who was using an 18.7 inch reflector telescope at the time. Astronomer Steve Gottlieb described the galaxy as faint, albeit large, and edge-on from the perspective of the Milky Way; he also noted how the galaxy could only be observed clearly with peripheral vision, not by looking directly at it.

== See also ==
- NGC
- UGC
- List of NGC objects
