= Herschel baronets =

Extinct baronetcy in the Baronetage of the United Kingdom

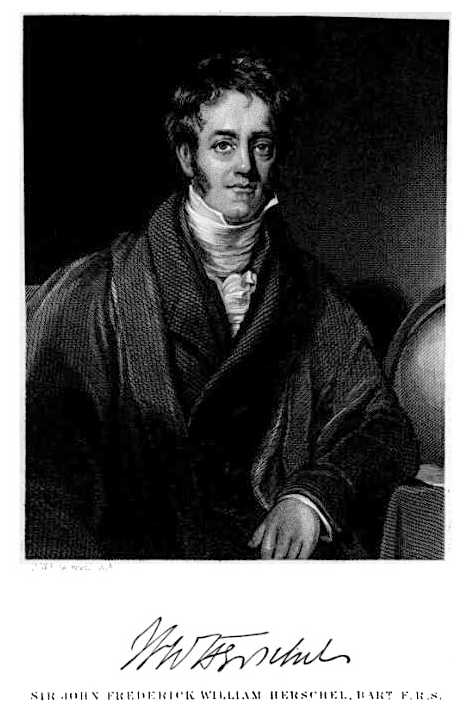
Sir John Herschel, 1st Baronet, in 1846

The Herschel baronetcy, of Slough in the County of Buckingham, was a title in the Baronetage of the United Kingdom. It was created on 17 July 1838 for John Herschel, son of the astronomer Sir William Herschel, and a well-known astronomer in his own right. The baronetcy became extinct on the death of the third baronet on 15 June 1950.

== Herschel baronets, of Slough (1838) ==
- Sir John Frederick William Herschel, 1st Baronet (1792–1871)
- Sir William James Herschel, 2nd Baronet (1833–1917)
- Rev. Sir John Charles William Herschel, F.R.A.S., 3rd Baronet (1869–1950)

== Arms ==
Coat of arms of Herschel baronets

Coat of arms of Herschel baronets

Crest
A demi-terrestrial sphere Proper thereon an eagle wings elevated Or.
Escutcheon
Argent on a mount Vert a representation of the forty feet reflecting telescope with its apparatus Proper a chief Azure thereon the astronomical symbol of Uranus or the Georgium Sidus irradiated Or.
Motto
Coelis Exploratis

Baronetage of the United Kingdom
Preceded by O'Loghlen baronets	Herschel baronets of Slough; 17 July 1838	Succeeded by Lytton baronets
