= Steve Gottlieb (amateur astronomer) =

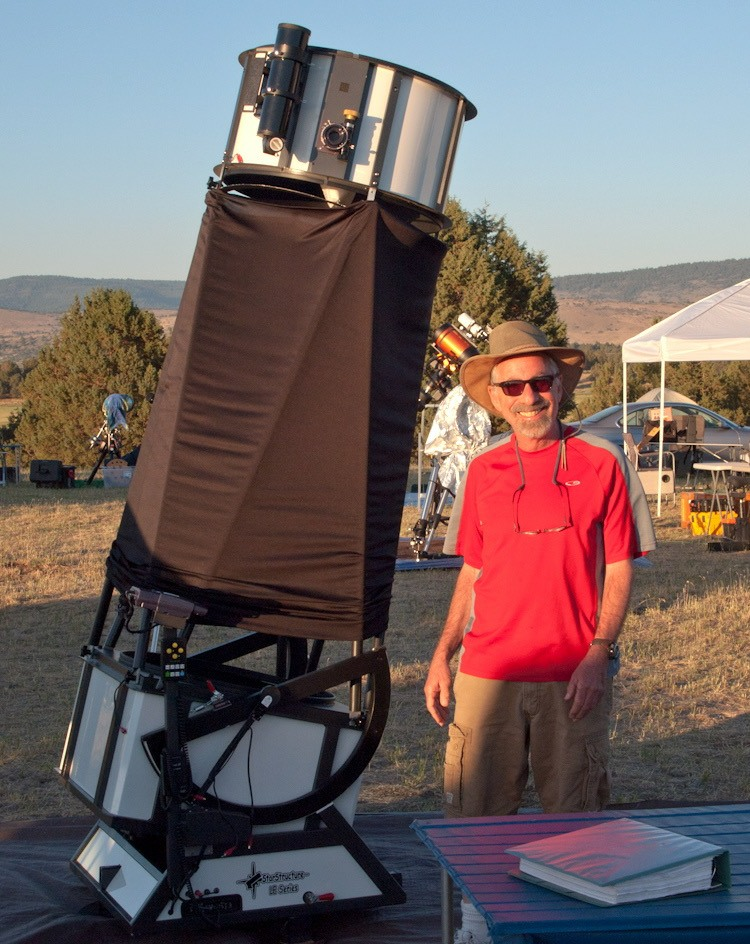
- Born: April 4, 1949 (age 77); Los Angeles, California
- Known for: Amateur astronomy, NGC/IC Project

Steven Michael Gottlieb (born April 4, 1949) is an American amateur astronomer, researcher, writer and lecturer.

== Biography ==
Gottlieb grew up in the Los Angeles area, later moving to Northern California. In 1973, he earned a master's degree in mathematics at the University of California, Berkeley. Settling in the town of Albany, he taught high school mathematics in the East Bay for 37 years.

== Amateur astronomy ==
Gottlieb began systematically observing Messier objects in 1977, using a 6-inch reflecting telescope. He employed many different scopes over the years, observing from dark sky sites near the San Francisco Bay Area, the Sierra Nevada foothills and star party events in California and elsewhere. By 2017, he had logged all 7,840 entries of the NGC Catalogue, completing the list after several visits to the Southern Hemisphere. His resulting compendium of visual observing reports has become a valuable resource for amateur astronomers.

Gottlieb describes himself as a "hardcore visual observer", having never developed an interest in astrophotography. For him, "it's always been about the aesthetics at the eyepiece in a large scope". Currently his main telescope is a 24-inch StarStructure Dobsonian with computerized GoTo system. As of this writing, Gottlieb is the only known person to have visually observed all of the valid NGC objects.

== NGC/IC Project ==
As Gottlieb's interests developed, he researched at the nearby UC Berkeley astronomy library, comparing his observations with those of professionals and with the Palomar Observatory Sky Survey. While so doing he discovered numerous errors and conflicting data, so began corresponding with other astronomers including Dr. Harold Corwin of the University of Texas.

Gottlieb thus became one of the principal investigators of the NGC/IC Project, a collaboration among professional and amateur astronomers to identify and image objects, compile historical observations and correct mistakes in the NGC and IC catalogues of deep-sky objects.

While helping to put the catalogues in order, he also worked with various telescope makers to correct the databases of computerized DSCs (digital setting circles) and GoTo systems. Later he gathered the list of objects and wrote descriptions for the "DeepMap 600", a popular folding star chart.

== Astronomy writer, public lecturer ==
In the 1980s Gottlieb began writing articles for astronomy magazines about observing galaxy groups, various types of nebulae, supernova remnants and other topics. He is a Contributing editor for Sky and Telescope magazine, and his observing articles are often featured in the "Going Deep" column.

Gottlieb promotes visual observing through public lectures for astronomy and science groups in Northern California and elsewhere.
