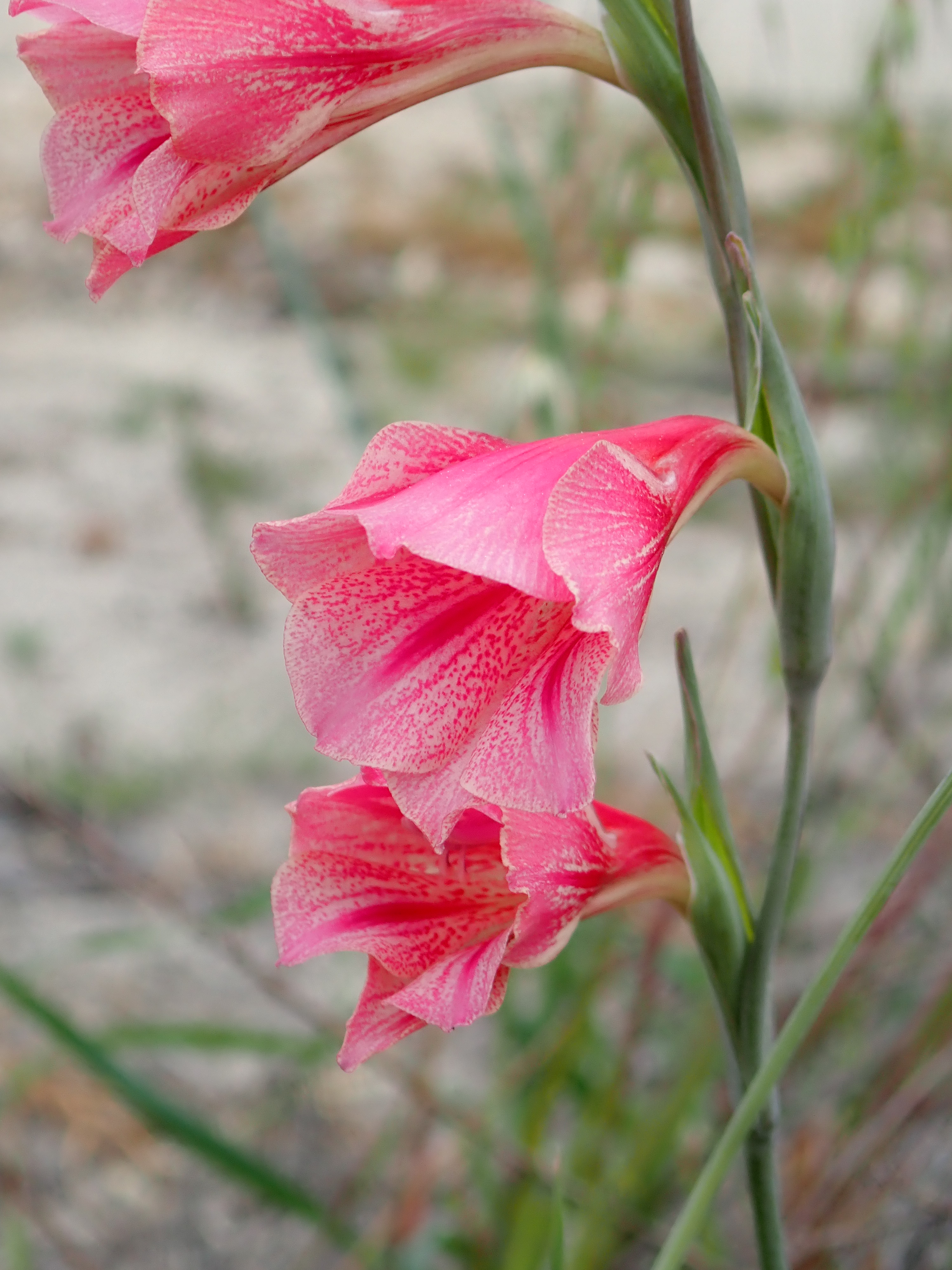

Scientific classification
- Kingdom: Plantae
- Clade: Tracheophytes
- Clade: Angiosperms
- Clade: Monocots
- Order: Asparagales
- Family: Iridaceae
- Genus: Gladiolus
- Species: G. caryophyllaceus

Binomial name
- Gladiolus caryophyllaceus (Burm.f.) Poir.

Synonyms
- Anisanthus caryophyllaceus (Burm.f.) Klatt; Antholyza caryophyllacea Burm.f. Gladiolus similis Eckl. Homoglossum caryophyllaceum (Burm.f.) N.E.Br. Watsonia amoena var. rosea (Andrews) Pers.

= Gladiolus caryophyllaceus =

Species of flowering plant

Gladiolus caryophyllaceus is a Gladiolus species native to the Cape Provinces in South Africa. It is a weed in Western Australia.
