= John Herschel =

English polymath (1792–1871)

Sir John Herschel Bt KH FRS
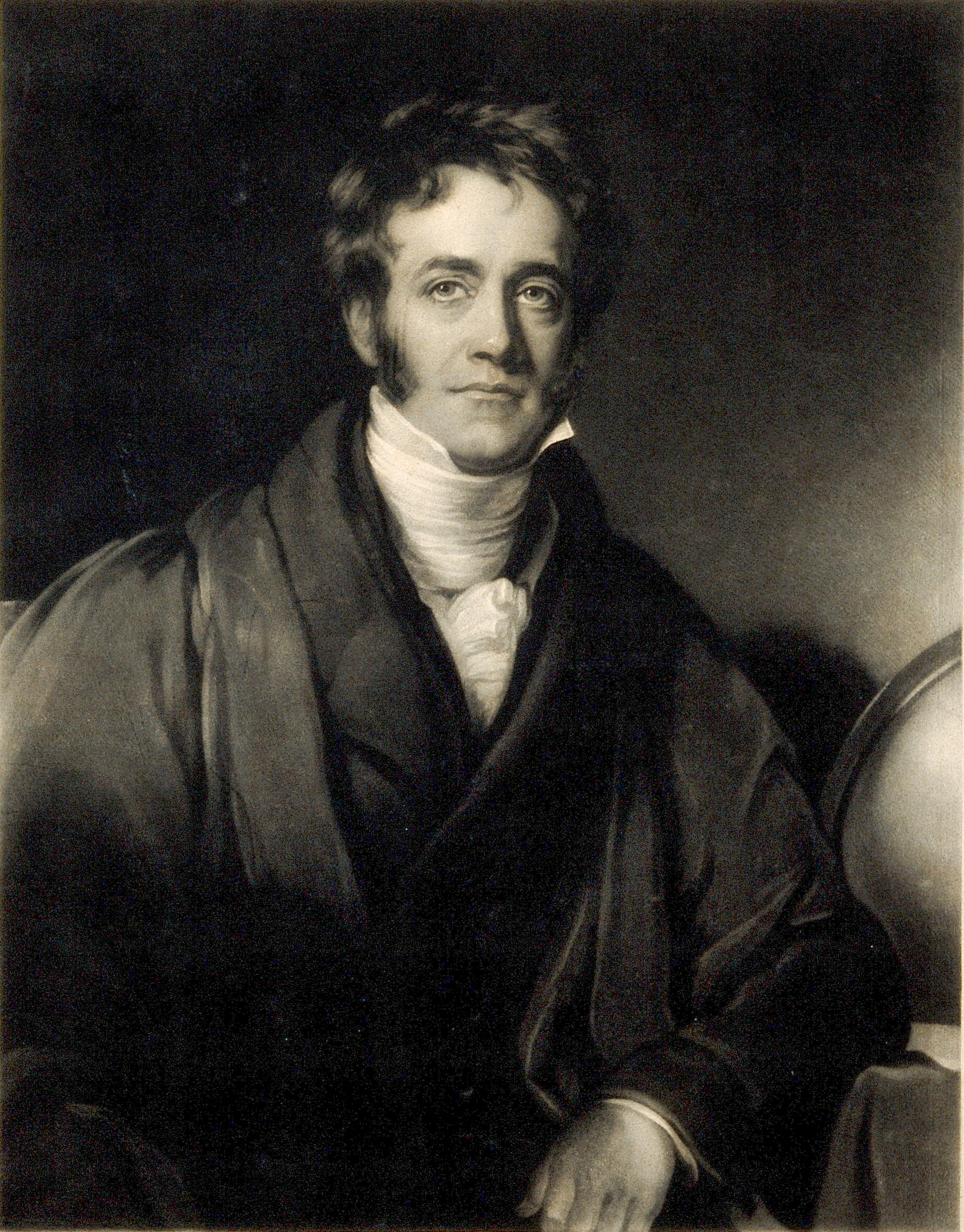
- John Herschel, 1835 mezzotint by W. Ward, after Henry William Pickersgill
- Born: John Frederick William Herschel; 7 March 1792; Slough, Buckinghamshire, England
- Died: 11 May 1871 (aged 79); Collingwood, near Hawkhurst, Kent, England
- Resting place: Westminster Abbey
- Education: Eton College, St John's College, Cambridge
- Known for: Contributions to the invention of photography
- Spouse: Margaret Brodie Stewart
- Awards: Smith's Prize (1813); Copley Medal (1821, 1847); Lalande Medal (1825); Gold Medal of the Royal Astronomical Society (1826, 1836); Royal Medal (1836, 1840); Knight of the Royal Guelphic Order
- Scientific career
- Fields: Astronomy; photography; chemistry; optics; botany; philosophy of science

Sir John Frederick William Herschel, 1st Baronet (/ˈhɜːrʃəl, ˈhɛər-/; 7 March 1792 – 11 May 1871) was an English polymath active as a mathematician, astronomer, chemist, inventor and experimental photographer who invented the blueprint and did botanical work.

Herschel originated the use of the Julian day system in astronomy. He named seven moons of Saturn and four moons of Uranus – the seventh planet, discovered by his father Sir William Herschel. He made many contributions to the science of photography, and investigated colour blindness and the chemical power of ultraviolet rays. His Preliminary Discourse (1831), which advocated an inductive approach to scientific experiment and theory-building, was an important contribution to the philosophy of science.

== Early life and work on astronomy ==
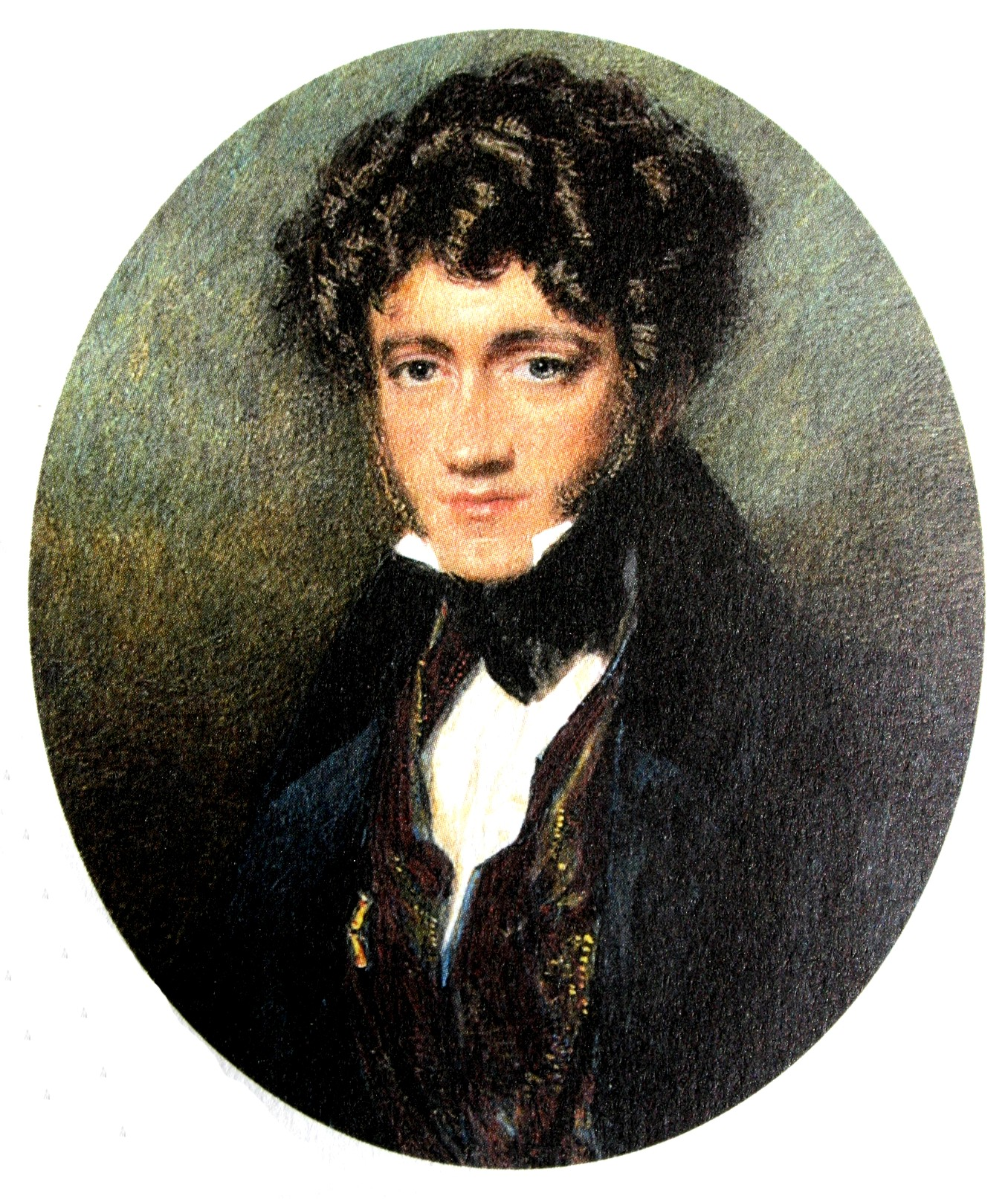
Portrait of a young Herschel by Alfred Edward Chalon

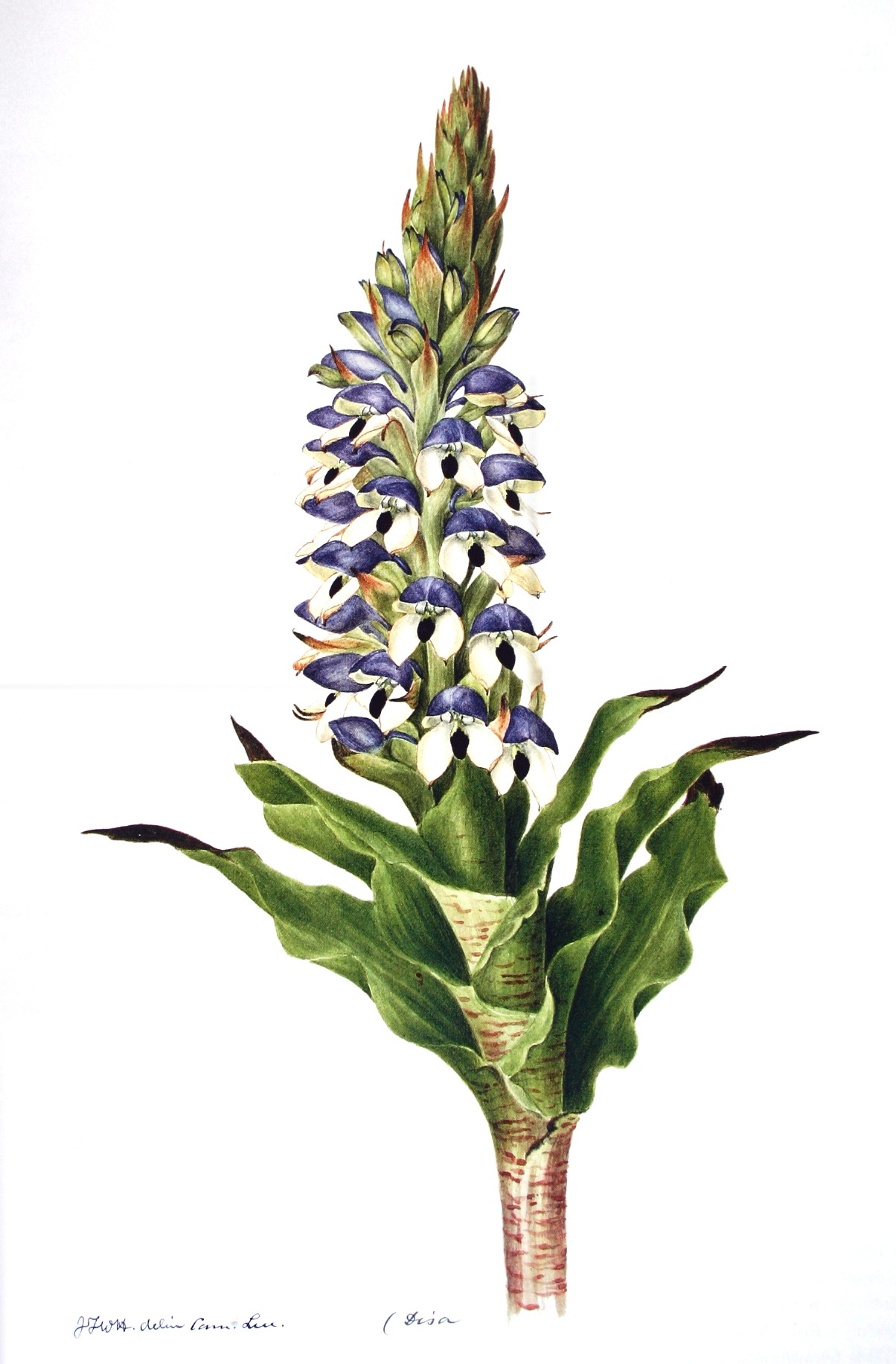
Disa cornuta (L.) Sw. by Margaret & John Herschel

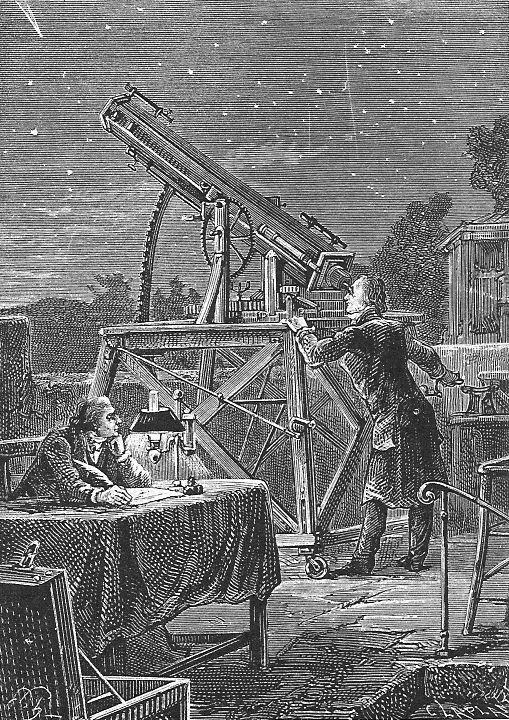
An illustration to Jules Verne's novel Hector Servadac from 1877 shows Herschel observing Halley's Comet in 1835 in Cape Town. Engraving by Charles Laplante after Paul Philippoteaux

Herschel was born in Slough, Buckinghamshire, the son of Mary Baldwin and astronomer Sir William Herschel. He was the nephew of astronomer Caroline Herschel. He studied shortly at Eton College and St John's College, Cambridge, graduating as Senior Wrangler in 1813. It was during his time as an undergraduate that he became friends with the mathematicians Charles Babbage and George Peacock. He left Cambridge in 1816 and started working with his father. He took up astronomy in 1816, building a reflecting telescope with a mirror 18 inches (460 mm) in diameter, and with a 20-foot (6.1 m) focal length. Between 1821 and 1823 he re-examined together with James South the double stars catalogued his father had assembled. He was one of the founders of the Royal Astronomical Society in 1820. For his work he was presented with the Gold Medal of the Royal Astronomical Society in 1826, which he won again in 1836. His work was also awarded with the Lalande Medal of the French Academy of Sciences in 1825. In 1821 the Royal Society bestowed upon him the Copley Medal for his mathematical contributions to their Transactions. Herschel was made a Knight of the Royal Guelphic Order in 1831, and he served as president of the Royal Astronomical Society three times between 1827 and 1829, 1839 and 1841, and 1847 and 1849.

Herschel's A preliminary discourse on the study of natural philosophy, published early in 1831 as part of Dionysius Lardner's Cabinet cyclopædia, set out methods of scientific investigation with an orderly relationship between observation and theorising. He described nature as being governed by laws which were difficult to discern or to state mathematically, and the highest aim of natural philosophy was understanding these laws through inductive reasoning, finding a single unifying explanation for a phenomenon. This became an authoritative statement with wide influence on science, particularly at the University of Cambridge where it inspired the student Charles Darwin with "a burning zeal" to contribute to this work.

He was elected as a member to the American Philosophical Society in 1854.

Herschel published a catalogue of his astronomical observations in 1864, as the General Catalogue of Nebulae and Clusters, a compilation of his own work and that of his father's, expanding on the senior Herschel's Catalogue of Nebulae. A further complementary volume was published posthumously, as the General Catalogue of 10,300 Multiple and Double Stars.

Herschel correctly considered astigmatism to be due to irregularity of the cornea and theorised that vision could be improved by the application of some animal jelly contained in a capsule of glass against the cornea. His views were published in an article entitled Light in 1828 and the Encyclopædia Metropolitana in 1845. Herschel's discoveries include the galaxies NGC 7, NGC 10, NGC 25, and NGC 28.

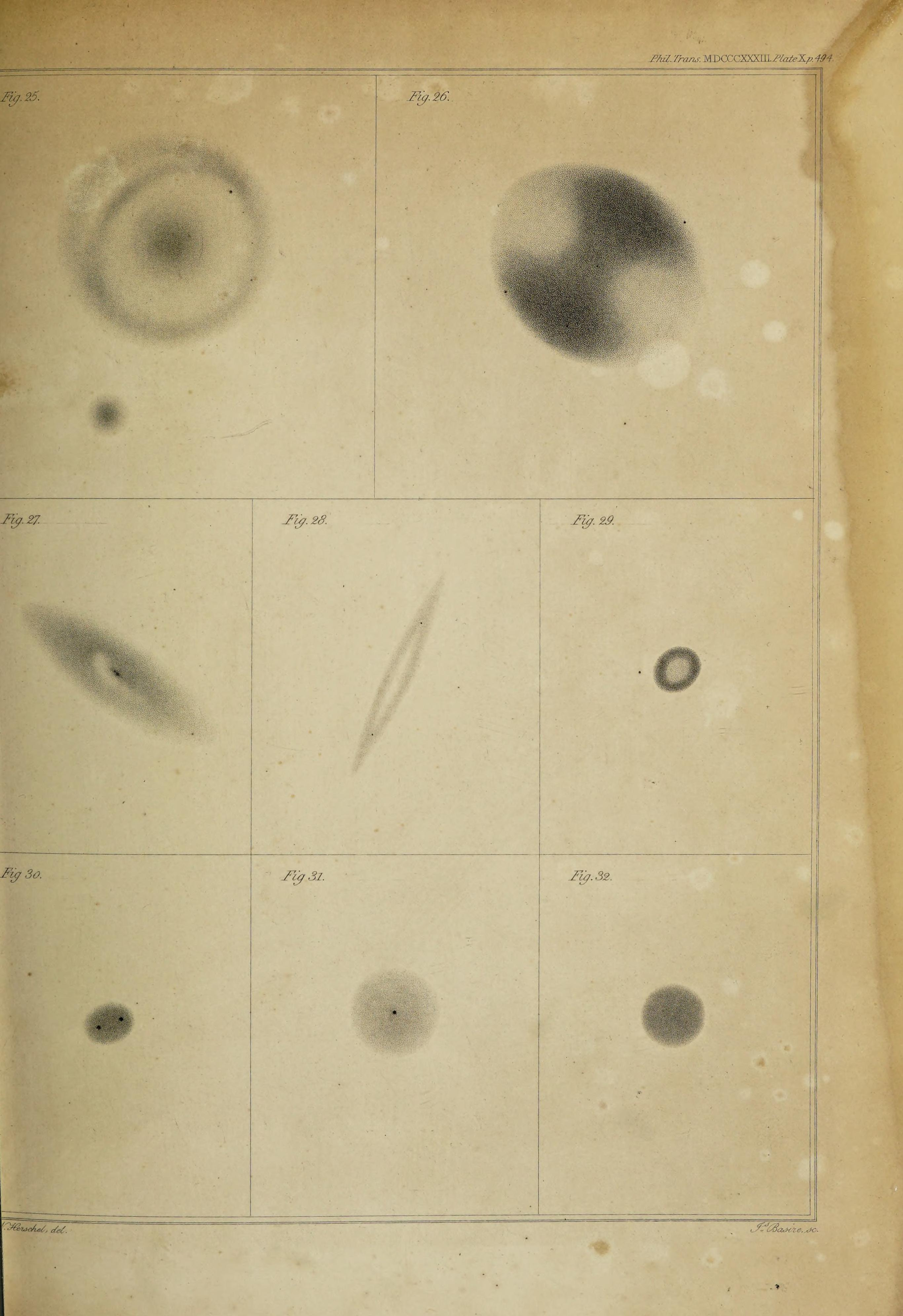
Dumbbell Nebula illustrations in "Observations of Nebulae and Clusters of Stars, Made at Slough, with a Twenty-Feet Reflector, between the Years 1825 and 1833" in Philosophical Transactions of the Royal Society, London, 1833

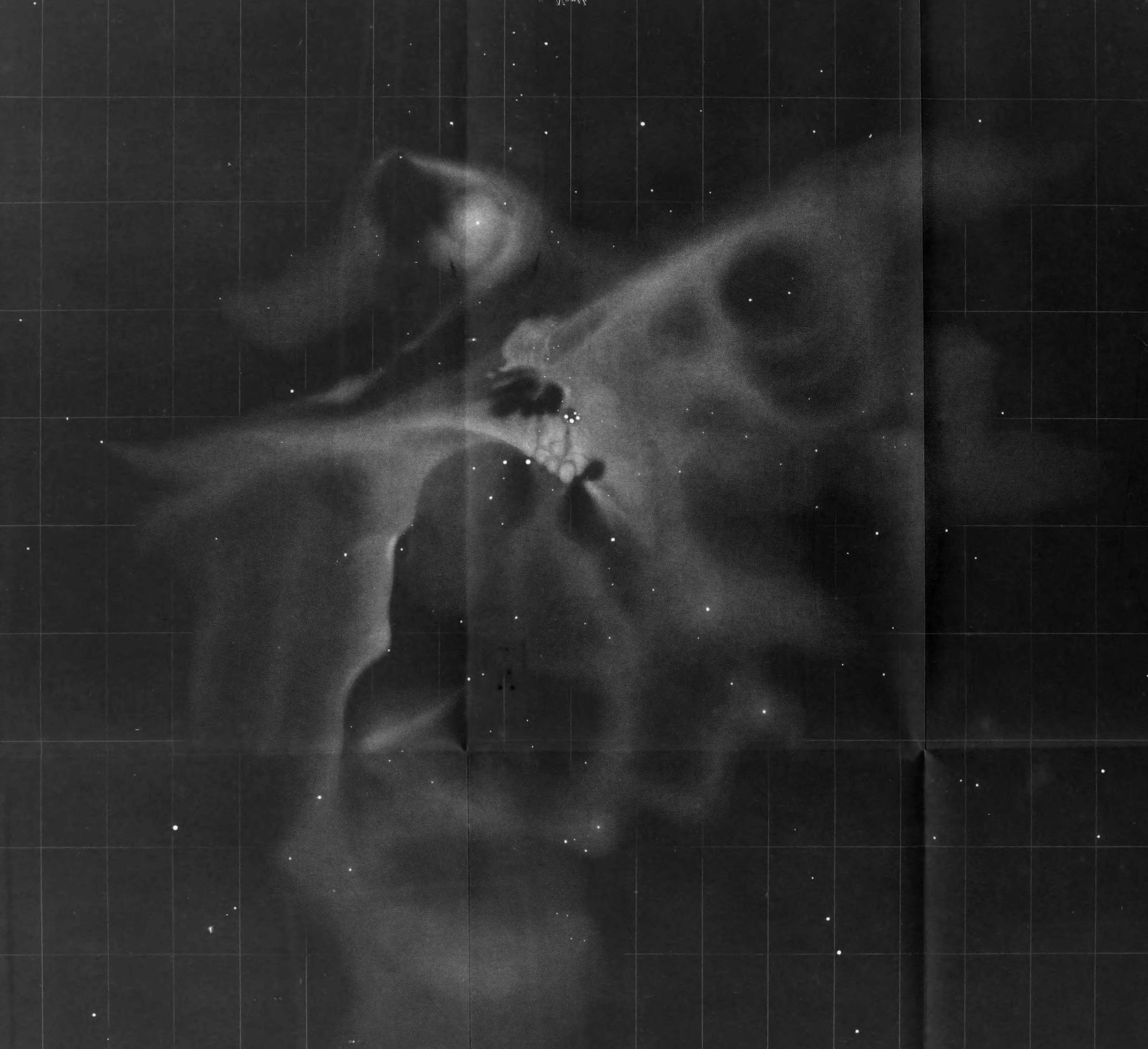
Orion Nebula from the results of astronomical observations made during the years 1834–1838 at the Cape of Good Hope; being the completion of a telescopic survey of the whole surface of the visible heavens, commenced in 1825

== Visit to South Africa ==
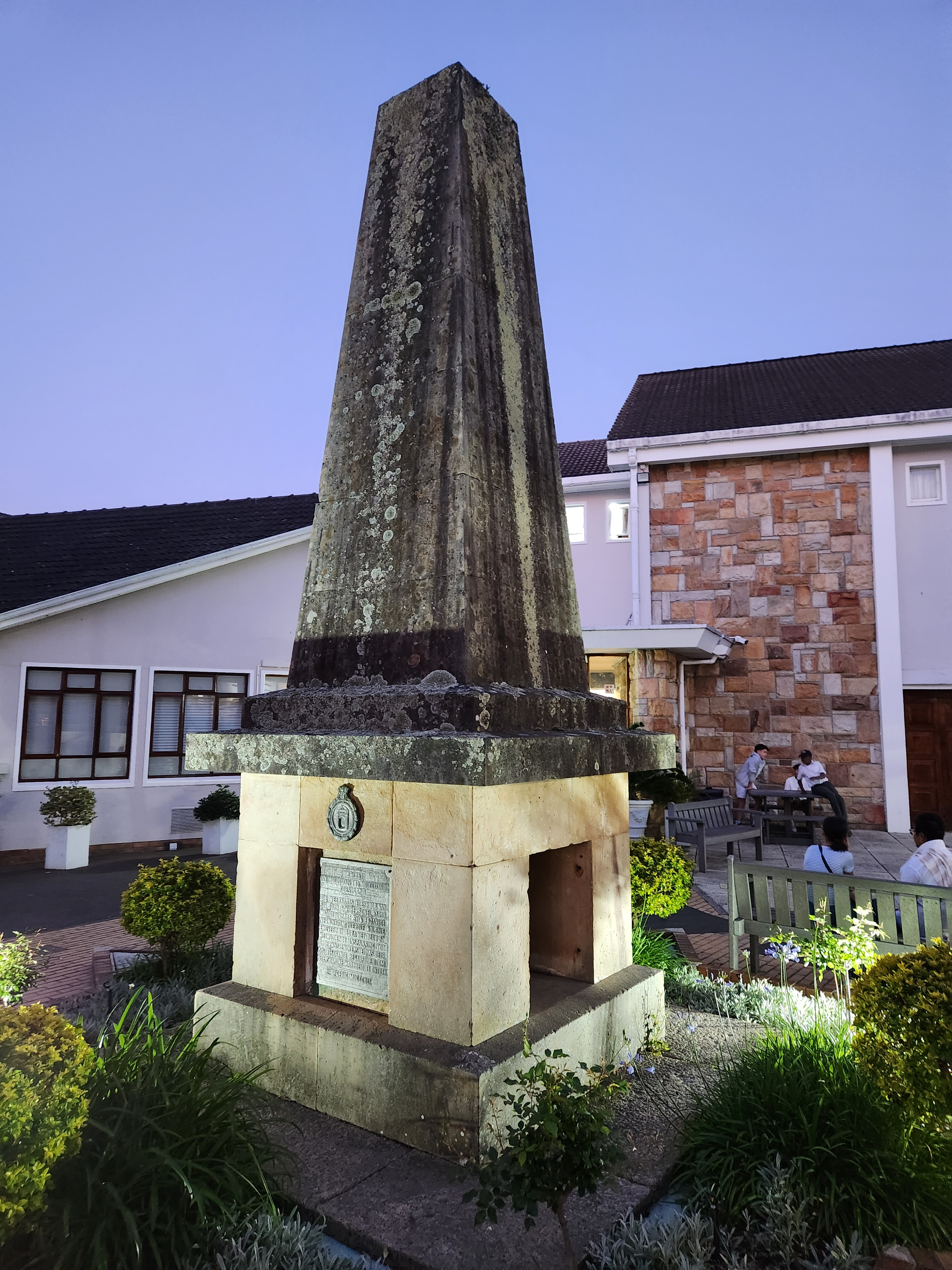
The Herschel Memorial Obelisk marking the location of Herschel's telescope in Cape Town.

He declined an offer from the Duke of Sussex that they travel to South Africa on a Navy ship. Herschel had his own inherited money and he paid £500 for passage on the S.S. Mountstuart Elphinstone. He, his wife, their three children and his 20-inch telescope departed from Portsmouth on 13 November 1833.

The voyage to South Africa was made to catalogue the stars, nebulae, and other objects of the southern skies. This was to be a completion as well as extension of the survey of the northern heavens undertaken initially by his father William Herschel. He arrived in Cape Town on 15 January 1834 and set up a private 21 ft (6.4 m) telescope at Feldhausen (site of present-day Grove Primary School) at Claremont, a suburb of Cape Town. Amongst his other observations during this time was that of the return of Comet Halley. Herschel collaborated with Thomas Maclear, the Astronomer Royal at the Cape of Good Hope and the members of the two families became close friends. During this time, he also witnessed the Great Eruption of Eta Carinae (December 1837).

In addition to his astronomical work, however, this voyage to a far corner of the British empire also gave Herschel an escape from the pressures under which he found himself in London, where he was one of the most sought-after of all British men of science. While in southern Africa, he engaged in a broad variety of scientific pursuits free from a sense of strong obligations to a larger scientific community. It was, he later recalled, probably the happiest time in his life. A village in the contemporary province of Eastern Cape is named after him.

Herschel combined his talents with those of his wife, Margaret, and between 1834 and 1838 they produced 131 botanical illustrations of fine quality, showing the Cape flora. Herschel used a camera lucida to obtain accurate outlines of the specimens and left the details to his wife. Even though their portfolio had been intended as a personal record, and despite the lack of floral dissections in the paintings, their accurate rendition makes them more valuable than many contemporary collections. Some 112 of the 132 known flower studies were collected and published as Flora Herscheliana in 1996. The book also included work by Charles Davidson Bell and Thomas Bowler.

As their home during their stay in the Cape, the Herschels had selected 'Feldhausen' ("Field Houses"), an old estate on the south-eastern side of Table Mountain. Here John set up his reflector to begin his survey of the southern skies.

Herschel, at the same time, read widely. Intrigued by the ideas of gradual formation of landscapes set out in Charles Lyell's Principles of Geology, he wrote to Lyell on 20 February 1836 praising the book as a work that would bring "a complete revolution in [its] subject, by altering entirely the point of view in which it must thenceforward be contemplated" and opening a way for bold speculation on "that mystery of mysteries, the replacement of extinct species by others." Herschel himself thought catastrophic extinction and renewal "an inadequate conception of the Creator" and by analogy with other intermediate causes, "the origination of fresh species, could it ever come under our cognizance, would be found to be a natural in contradistinction to a miraculous process". He prefaced his words with the couplet:

He that on such quest would go must know not fear or failing
To coward soul or faithless heart the search were unavailing.

Taking a gradualist view of development and referring to evolutionary descent from a proto-language, Herschel commented:

Words are to the Anthropologist what rolled pebbles are to the Geologist – battered relics of past ages often containing within them indelible records capable of intelligent interpretation – and when we see what amount of change 2000 years has been able to produce in the languages of Greece & Italy or 1000 in those of Germany France & Spain we naturally begin to ask how long a period must have lapsed since the Chinese, the Hebrew, the Delaware & the Malesass [Malagasy] had a point in common with the German & Italian & each other – Time! Time! Time! – we must not impugn the Scripture Chronology, but we must interpret it in accordance with whatever shall appear on fair enquiry to be the truth for there cannot be two truths. And really there is scope enough: for the lives of the Patriarchs may as reasonably be extended to 5000 or 50000 years apiece as the days of Creation to as many thousand millions of years.

The document was circulated, and Charles Babbage incorporated extracts in his ninth and unofficial Bridgewater Treatise, which postulated laws set up by a divine programmer. When HMS Beagle called at Cape Town, Captain Robert FitzRoy and the young naturalist Charles Darwin visited Herschel on 3 June 1836. Later on, Darwin would be influenced by Herschel's writings in developing his theory advanced in The Origin of Species. In the opening lines of that work, Darwin writes that his intent is "to throw some light on the origin of species – that mystery of mysteries, as it has been called by one of our greatest philosophers," referring to Herschel. However, Herschel ultimately rejected the theory of natural selection.

Herschel returned to England in 1838, was created a baronet, of Slough in the County of Buckingham, and published Results of Astronomical Observations made at the Cape of Good Hope in 1847. In this publication he proposed the names still used today for the seven then-known satellites of Saturn: Mimas, Enceladus, Tethys, Dione, Rhea, Titan, and Iapetus. In the same year, Herschel received his second Copley Medal from the Royal Society for this work. A few years later, in 1852, he proposed the names still used today for the four then-known satellites of Uranus: Ariel, Umbriel, Titania, and Oberon. A stone obelisk, erected in 1842 and now in the grounds of The Grove Primary School, marks the site where his 20-ft reflector once stood.

== Photography ==
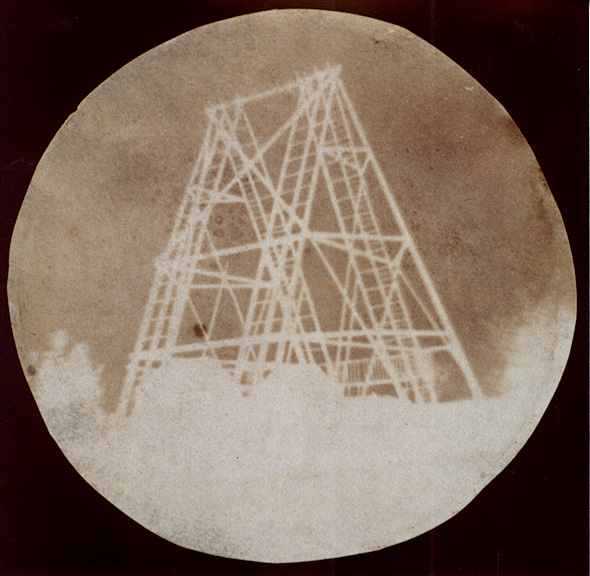
Herschel's first glass-plate phototographic negative, dated 9 September 1839, showing the mount of his father's 40-foot telescope

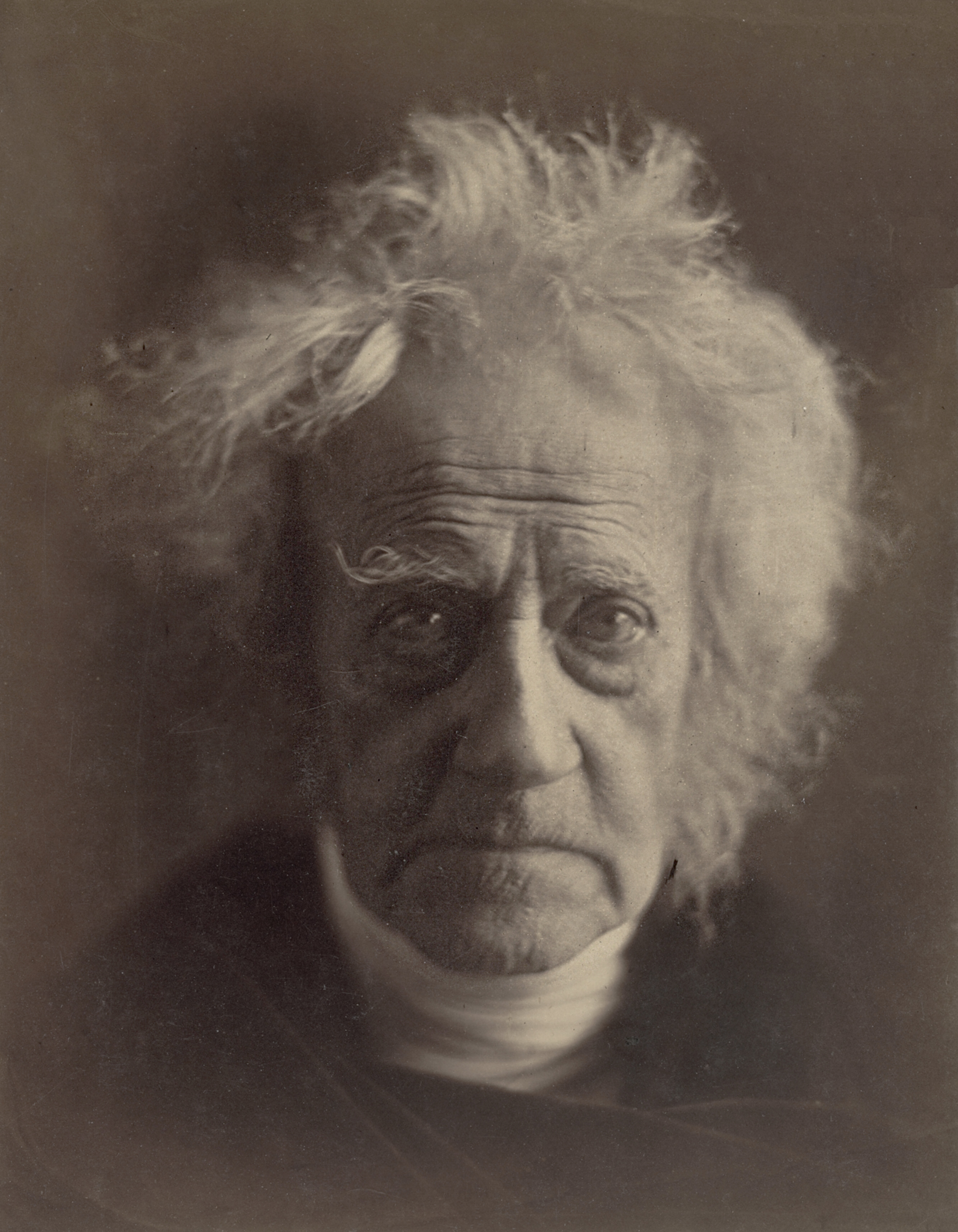
John Herschel, portrait by Julia Margaret Cameron, April 1867

Herschel made numerous important contributions to photography. He made improvements in photographic processes, particularly in inventing the cyanotype process, which became known as blueprints, and variations, such as the chrysotype. In 1839, he made a photograph on glass, which still exists, and experimented with some colour reproduction, noting that rays of different parts of the spectrum tended to impart their own colour to a photographic paper. Herschel made experiments using photosensitive emulsions of vegetable juices, called phytotypes, also known as anthotypes, and published his discoveries in the Philosophical Transactions of the Royal Society of London in 1842. He collaborated in the early 1840s with Henry Collen, portrait painter to Queen Victoria. Herschel originally discovered the platinum process on the basis of the light sensitivity of platinum salts, later developed by William Willis.

Herschel coined the term photography in 1839. Herschel was also the first to apply the terms negative and positive to photography.

Herschel discovered sodium thiosulfate to be a solvent of silver halides in 1819, and informed Talbot and Daguerre of his discovery that this "hyposulphite of soda" ("hypo") could be used as a photographic fixer, to "fix" pictures and make them permanent, after experimentally applying it thus in early 1839.

In 1840, Herschel made the first infrared image (thermogram) via an evaporographic method of focusing solar rays onto a suspension of carbon particles in alcohol.

Herschel's ground-breaking research on the subject was read at the Royal Society in London in March 1839 and January 1840.

== Other aspects of Herschel's career ==
Herschel wrote many papers and articles, including entries on meteorology, physical geography and the telescope for the eighth edition of the Encyclopædia Britannica. He also translated the Iliad of Homer.

In 1823, Herschel published his findings on the optical spectra of metal salts.

Herschel invented the actinometer in 1825 to measure the direct heating power of the Sun's rays, and his work with the instrument is of great importance in the early history of photochemistry.

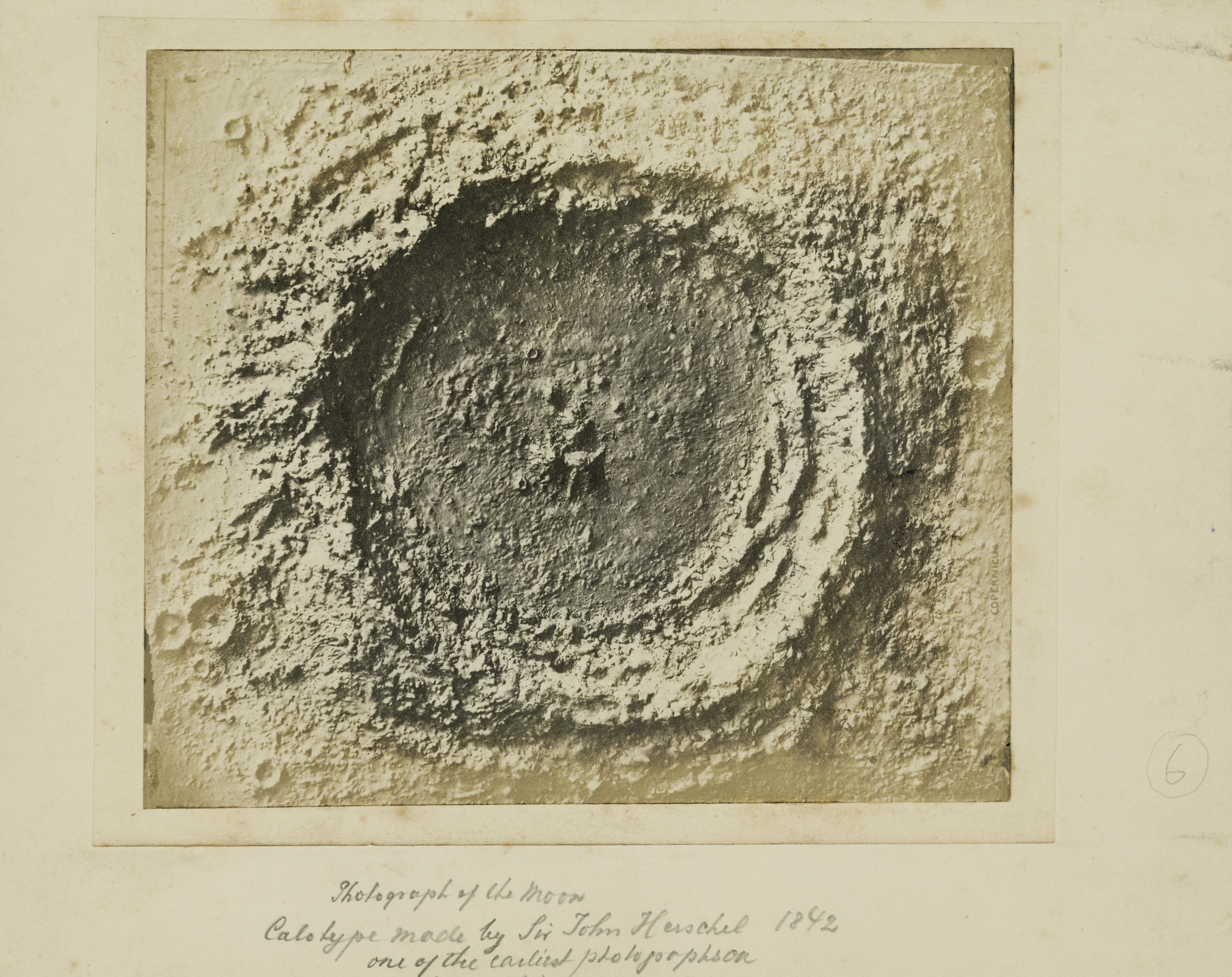
A Calotype of a model of the lunar crater Copernicus, 1842. Photographs of the Moon's surface were not yet possible at the time

Herschel proposed a correction to the Gregorian calendar, making years that are multiples of 4000 common years rather than leap years, thus reducing the average length of the calendar year from 365.2425 days to 365.24225. Although this is closer to the mean tropical year of 365.24219 days, his proposal has never been adopted because the Gregorian calendar is based on the mean time between vernal equinoxes (currently 365.242374 days).

Herschel was elected a Foreign Honorary Member of the American Academy of Arts and Sciences in 1832, and in 1836, a foreign member of the Royal Swedish Academy of Sciences.

In 1835, the New York Sun newspaper wrote a series of satiric articles that came to be known as the Great Moon Hoax, with statements falsely attributed to Herschel about his supposed discoveries of animals living on the Moon, including batlike winged humanoids.

Several locations are named for him: the village of Herschel in western Saskatchewan, Canada, site of the discovery of Dolichorhynchops herschelensis, a type of plesiosaur; Mount Herschel in Antarctica; the crater J. Herschel on the Moon; and the settlement of Herschel, Eastern Cape and the Herschel Girls' School in Cape Town, South Africa.

While it is commonly accepted that Herschel Island, in the Arctic Ocean, part of the Yukon Territory, was named after him, the entries in the expedition journal of Sir John Franklin state that the latter wished to honour the Herschel family, of which John Herschel's father, Sir William Herschel, and his aunt, Caroline Herschel, are as notable as John.

== Family ==
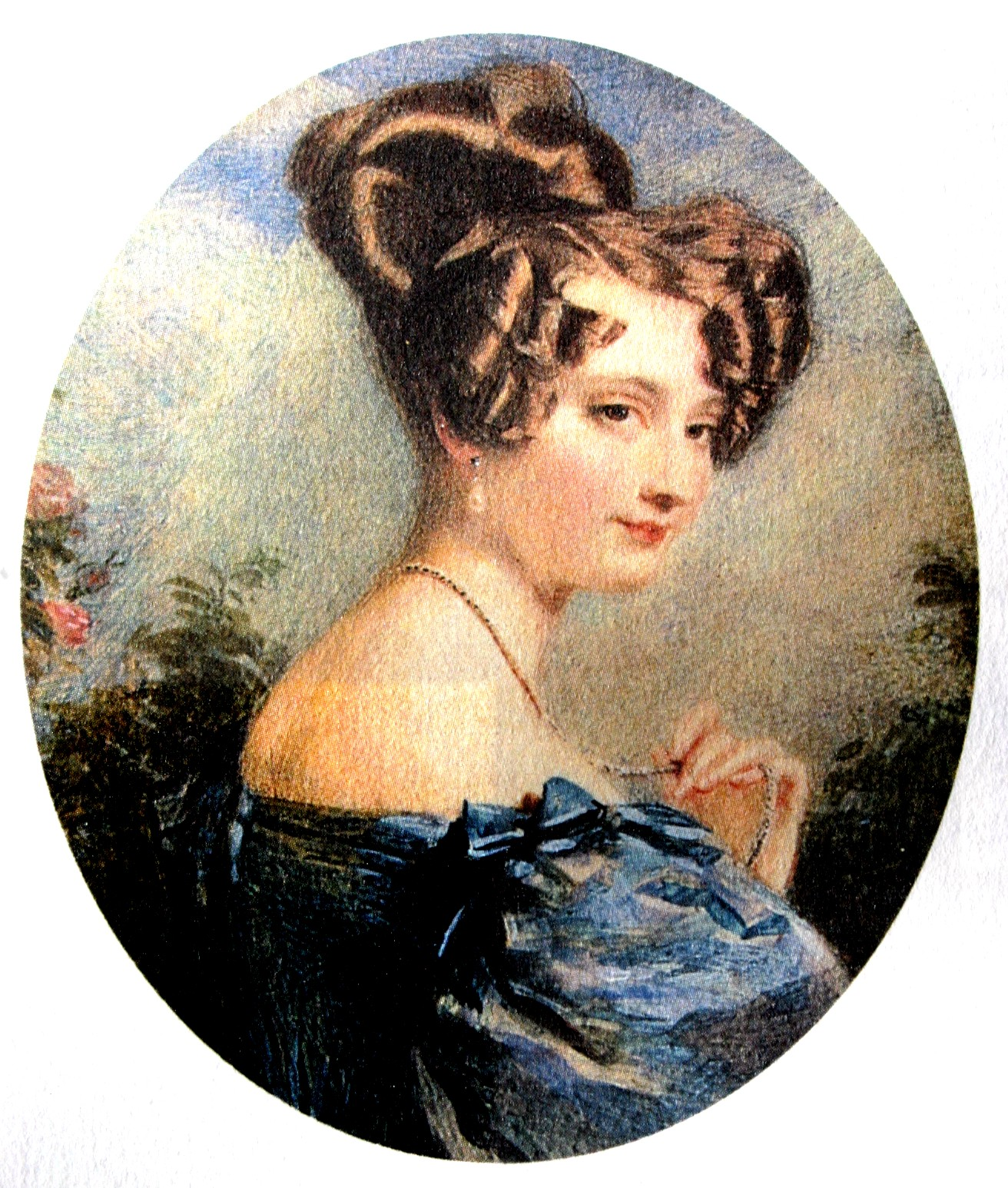
Margaret Brodie Stewart by Alfred Edward Chalon 1829

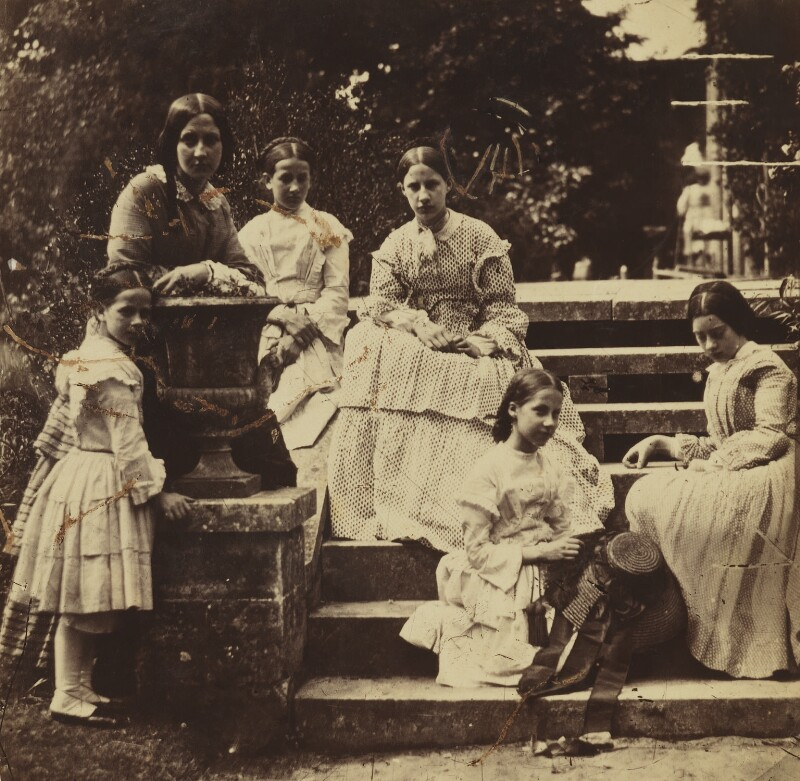
Herschel's daughters Constance Anne, Caroline Emilia Mary, Margaret Louisa, Isabella, Francisca ("Fancy") and Matilda Rose, 1860s, albumen print, unkn. photographer (NPG x44697)

Herschel married Margaret Brodie Stewart (1810–1884) on 3 March 1829 at St. Marlyebone Church in London, and was father of the following children:

1. Caroline Emilia Mary Herschel (31 March 1830 – 29 January 1909), who married the soldier and politician Alexander Hamilton-Gordon
2. Isabella Herschel (5 June 1831 – 1893)
3. Sir William James Herschel Bt (1833–1917), Indian Civil Service officer
4. Margaret Louisa Herschel (1834–1861), an accomplished artist, married Reginald Dykes Marshall
5. Alexander Stewart Herschel FRS FRAS (1836–1907), astronomer
6. Col. John Herschel FRS FRAS (1837–1921), surveyor
7. Maria Sophia Herschel (1839–1929), married Henry Hardcastle
8. Amelia Herschel (1841–1926), married Sir Thomas Francis Wade, diplomat and sinologist
9. Julia Herschel (1842–1933), married on 4 June 1878 to Captain (later Admiral) John Fiot Lee Pearse Maclear
10. Matilda Rose Herschel (1844–1914), a gifted artist, married William Waterfield, Indian Civil Service officer
11. Francisca Herschel (1846–1932)
12. Constance Anne Herschel (1855–1939), mathematician and scientist, married Sir Nevile Lubbock

== Death ==
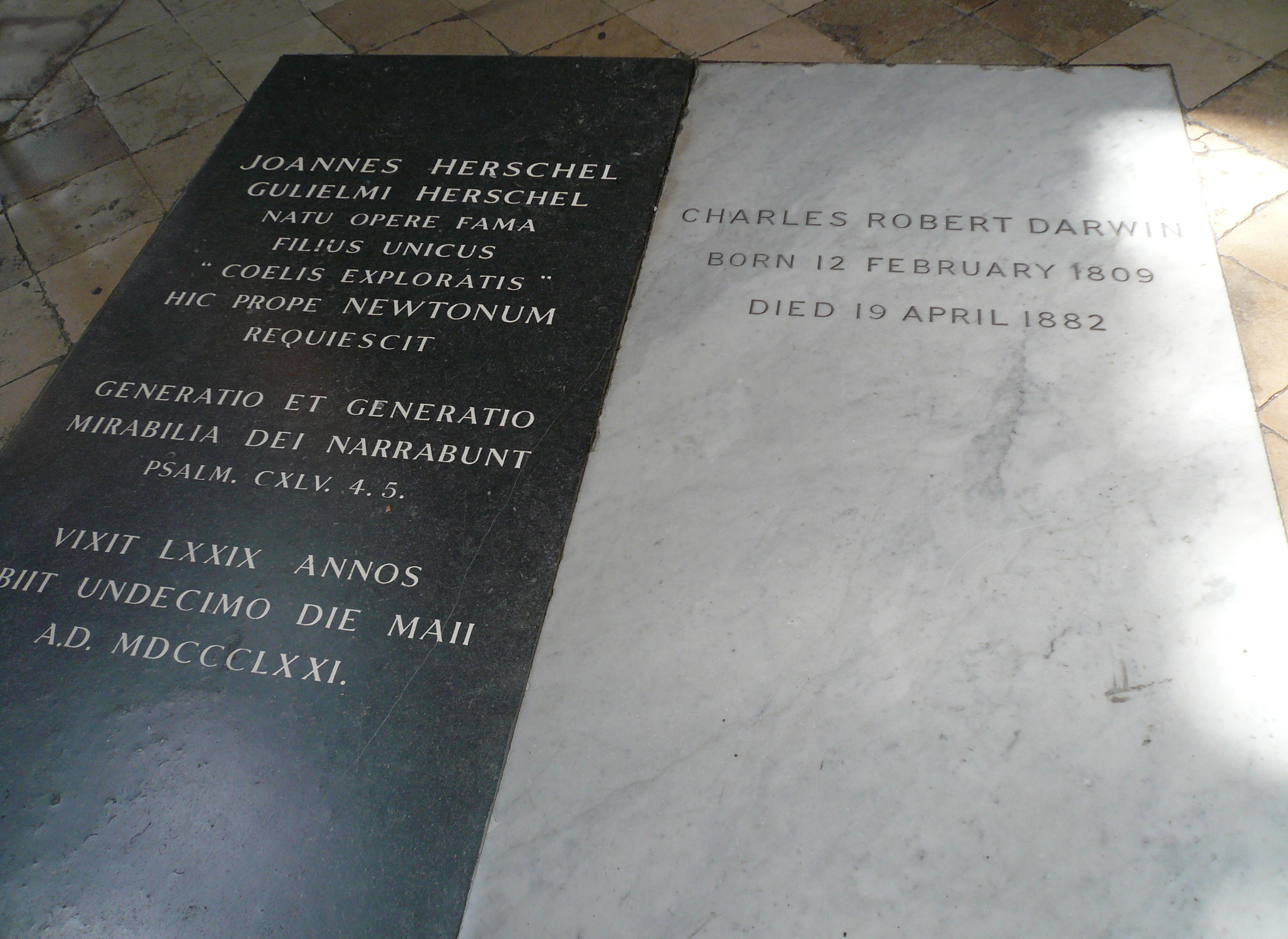
The adjoining tombs of John Herschel and Charles Darwin in Westminster Abbey.

Herschel died on 11 May 1871 at age 79 at Collingwood, his home near Hawkhurst in Kent. On his death, he was given a national funeral and buried in Westminster Abbey.

His obituary by Henry W Field of London was read to the American Philosophical Society on 1 December 1871.

== Arms ==
Coat of arms of John Herschel
Crest A demi-terrestrial sphere Proper thereon an eagle wings elevated Or. Escutcheon Argent on a mount Vert a representation of the forty feet reflecting telescope with its apparatus Proper a chief Azure thereon the astronomical symbol of Uranus or the Georgium Sidus irradiated Or. Motto Coelis Exploratis

== Works ==
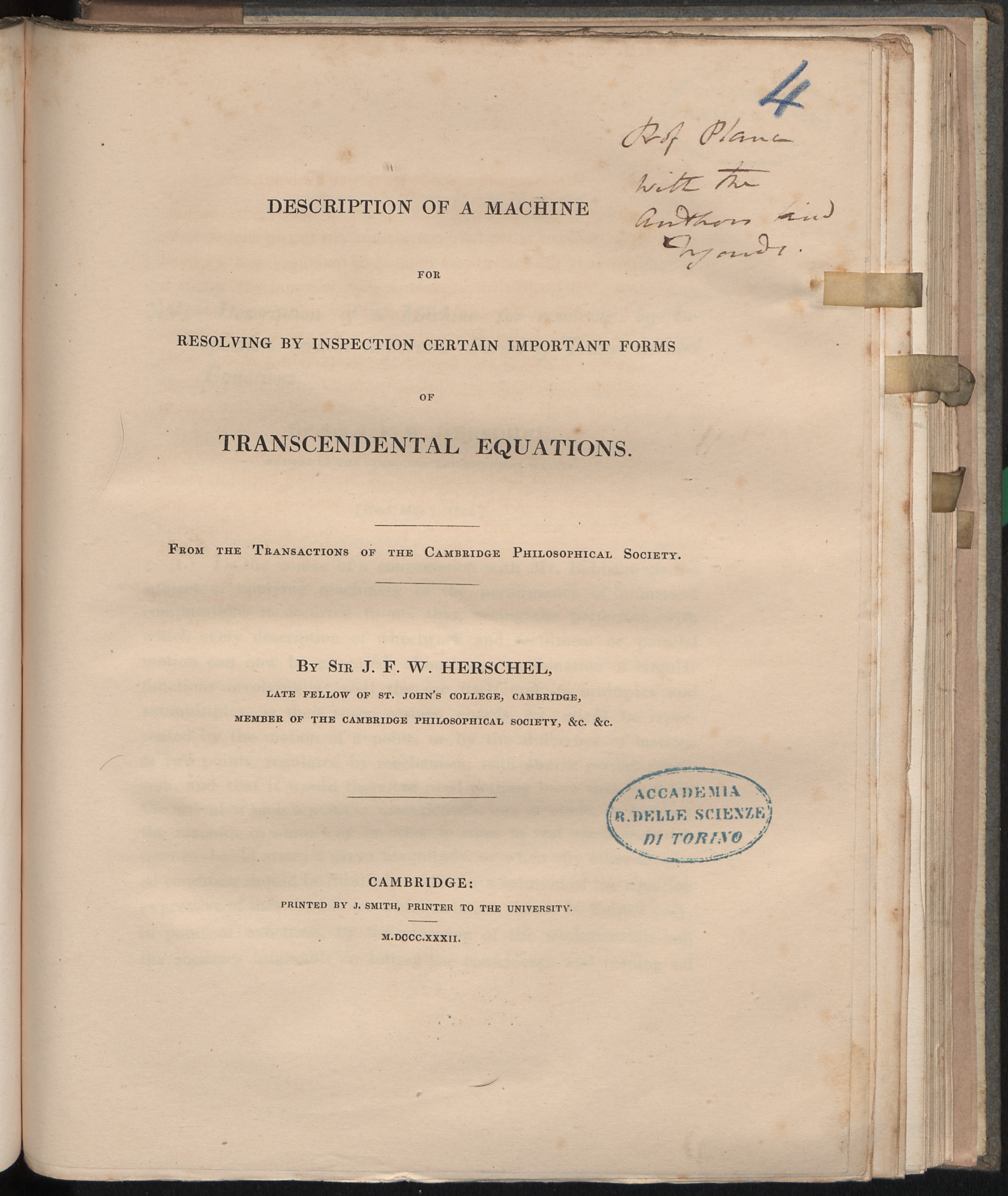
Description of a Machine for Resolving by Inspection Certain Important Forms of Transcendental Equations, 1832

- "On the Hyposulphurous Acid and its Compounds". The Edinburgh Philosophical Journal. 1: 19. 1819.
- On the Aberration of Compound Lenses and Object-Glasses. London: W. Bulmer and W. Nicol. 1821., Herschel, J. F. W. (1831). "On the Aberrations of Compound Lenses and Object-Glasses. [Abstract]". Abstracts of the Papers Printed in the Philosophical Transactions of the Royal Society of London. 2: 146–147. JSTOR 109979.
- Treatises on Physical Astronomy, Light and Sound, Contributed to the Encyclopaedia Metropolitana. London: Richard Griffin. (The Encyclopædia Metropolitana was published in 30 vols. from 1817 to 1845)
- "On the Absorption of Light by Coloured Media, and on the Colours of the Prismatic Spectrum Exhibited by Certain Flames; with an Account of a Ready Mode of Determining the Absolute Dispersive Power of Any Medium, by Direct Experiment". Transactions of the Royal Society of Edinburgh. 9 (2): 445–460. 1823. doi:10.1017/S008045680003101X. S2CID 101517638.
- A Preliminary Discourse on the Study of Natural Philosophy. London: Longman, Rees, Orme, Brown & Green. 1830. Bibcode:1830pdsn.book.....H.
- A Treatise on Astronomy (3rd ed.). Philadelphia: Carey, Leah and Blanchard. 1835.
- "On the Chemical Action of the Rays of the Solar Spectrum on Preparations of Silver and Other Substances, Both Metallic and Non-Metallic, and on Some Photographic Processes", Philosophical Transactions of the Royal Society of London, 130: 1–59, 20 February 1840, Bibcode:1840RSPT..130....1H, doi:10.1098/rstl.1840.0002, ISSN 0261-0523, JSTOR 108209, S2CID 98119765.
- "On the Action of the Rays of the Solar Spectrum on Vegetable Colours, and on Some New Photographic Processes", Philosophical Transactions of the Royal Society of London, 132: 182–214, 1842, Bibcode:1842RSPT..132..181H, doi:10.1098/rstl.1842.0013
- Results of Astronomical Observations Made During the Years 1834, 5, 6, 7, 8, at the Cape of Good Hope: Being the Completion of a Telescopic Survey of the Whole Surface of the Visible Heavens, Commenced in 1825, London: Smith, Elder and Co., 1847
- John Herschel, ed. (1849). Manual of Scientific Inquiry, Prepared for the Use of Officers in Her Majesty's Navy, and Travellers in General. J. Murray. LCCN 05022489.
- "Meteorology". Encyclopædia britannica. 1861.
- A General Catalogue of Nebulæ and Clusters of Stars. 1864.
- Familiar Lectures on Scientific Subjects. George Routledge & Sons. 1869. Bibcode:1869flss.book.....H.
- R. Main; C. Pritchard, eds. (1874). A Catalogue of 10,300 Multiple and Double Stars, Arranged in the Order of Right Ascension.
- Outlines of Astronomy. D. Appleton and Company. 1876a.
- Popular Lectures on Scientific Subjects. London: Dalby, Isbister & Co. 1876b.

Government offices
Preceded by Richard Lalor Sheil	Master of the Mint; 1850–1855	Succeeded by Thomas Graham
Baronetage of the United Kingdom
New creation	Baronet (of Slough); 1838–1871	Succeeded by William James Herschel
