= Me'assefim =

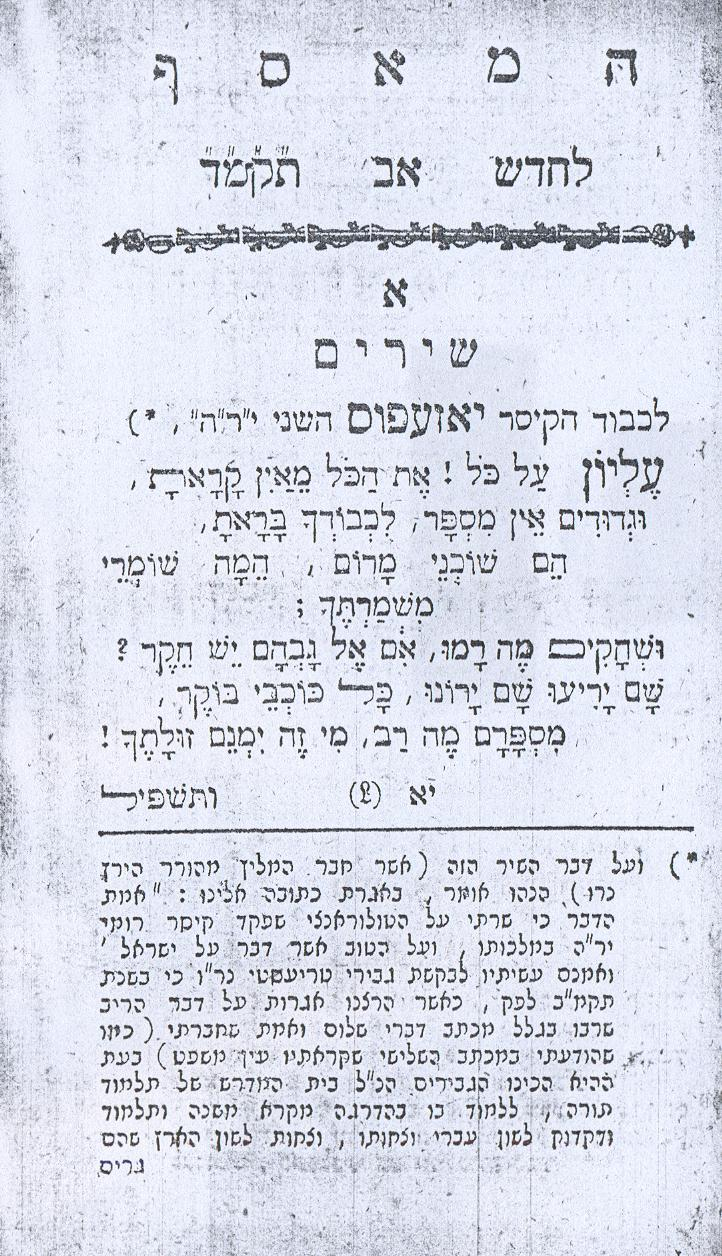
Av 5544 edition of Ha-Me'assef

The Me'assefim (Hebrew: המאספים) were a group of Hebrew writers who between 1784 and 1811 published their works in the periodical Ha-Me'assef (Hebrew: הַמְאַסֵּף), which they had founded.

== History ==
In 1782 Moses Mendelssohn's German translation of the Pentateuch had appeared. In the bi'ur or commentary which he added to this translation, he dwelt on the beauty of the Hebrew language, its wealth of imagery, and its adaptability for poetic expression. By his comments on scripture, also, he largely stimulated Hebrew, grammatical, and exegetic studies. The seeds he thus scattered bore fruit even in his lifetime. While reading and discussing Mendelssohn's scriptural expositions, Isaac Abraham Euchel and Mendel Bresslau, who were at that time tutoring in the house of David Friedländer at Königsberg, conceived the idea of causing Hebrew as a literary language to be used more widely among the Jews. Assured of the material support of Simon and Samuel Friedländer, they issued in the spring of 1783 an appeal to all Jews to assist in establishing a society for the study of Hebrew (Chebrat Doreshe Leshon 'Eber). The periodical Ha-Me'assef was projected as a rallying-point for all those who were interested in and able to contribute to the work.

The undertaking met with a cordial reception in many quarters, especially in Berlin. Mendelssohn and even the aged Naphtali Herz Wessely promised their support and contributed to Ha-Me'assef, the former anonymously. The first number of the periodical was announced April 13, 1783, in a prospectus, Nachal ha-Besor, signed by Euchel, Bresslau, and Samuel and Simon Friedländer. The first volume appeared in 1784, being the earliest successful periodical published in Hebrew. The first three volumes were issued in monthly numbers at Königsberg (the frontispiece to vol. iii being Naphtali Herz Wessely's portrait); vols. iv-vi appeared in quarterly numbers at Königsberg and Berlin; vol. vii (one number only) at Breslau; vol. viii at Berlin; the first two numbers of vol. ix at Altona, and the last two at Dessau; vol. x (two numbers only) also at Dessau. The new Collector (Achare ha-Me'assef or Ha-Me'assef he-Chadash), edited by S. Cohen, may be regarded as a continuation of Ha-Me'assef. Vol. i appeared at Berlin in 1809; vol. ii at Altona in 1810; and vol. iii at Dessau in 1811.

In addition to articles on Hebrew prose and poetry, Ha-Me'assef printed general scientific articles, papers on mathematics and natural science, biographies of eminent Hebrew scholars, and articles on the history of the Roman emperors. Responsa on religious questions, e.g., on the speedy burial of the dead, have also been collected in its pages. The attitude of Ha-Me'assef was by turns Orthodox or Reform, according to the views of the collaborator. It was often very aggressive toward the strictly Orthodox view, although Wessely had from the very beginning advised a purely objective point of view.

== Members ==
Collaborators on Ha-Me'assef included:

- Judah Löw Ben-Zeeb
- Simon ben Sanvil Bras
- Mendel Bresslau (Brese)
- Shalom Cohen
- Wolf ben Abraham Dessau
- Moses Ensheim
- Isaac Abraham Euchel
- David Franco Mendes
- David Friedländer
- David Friedrichsfeld
- Joseph Haltern
- Marcus Herz
- Nathan Joseph Hirsch
- Baruch Jeitteles
- Baruch Lindau
- Joel Löwe
- Marcus Löwisohn (Gompertz)
- Moses Mendelssohn
- Elia Morpurgo
- Meir Obernik
- Naphtali Herz Wessely
- Joseph Witzhausen (Veit)
- Aaron Wolfsohn (Halle)

== See also ==
- Biurists
- Haskalah
