= Heinrich Josefsohn =

Bible translator from Prague (c.1770–1840)

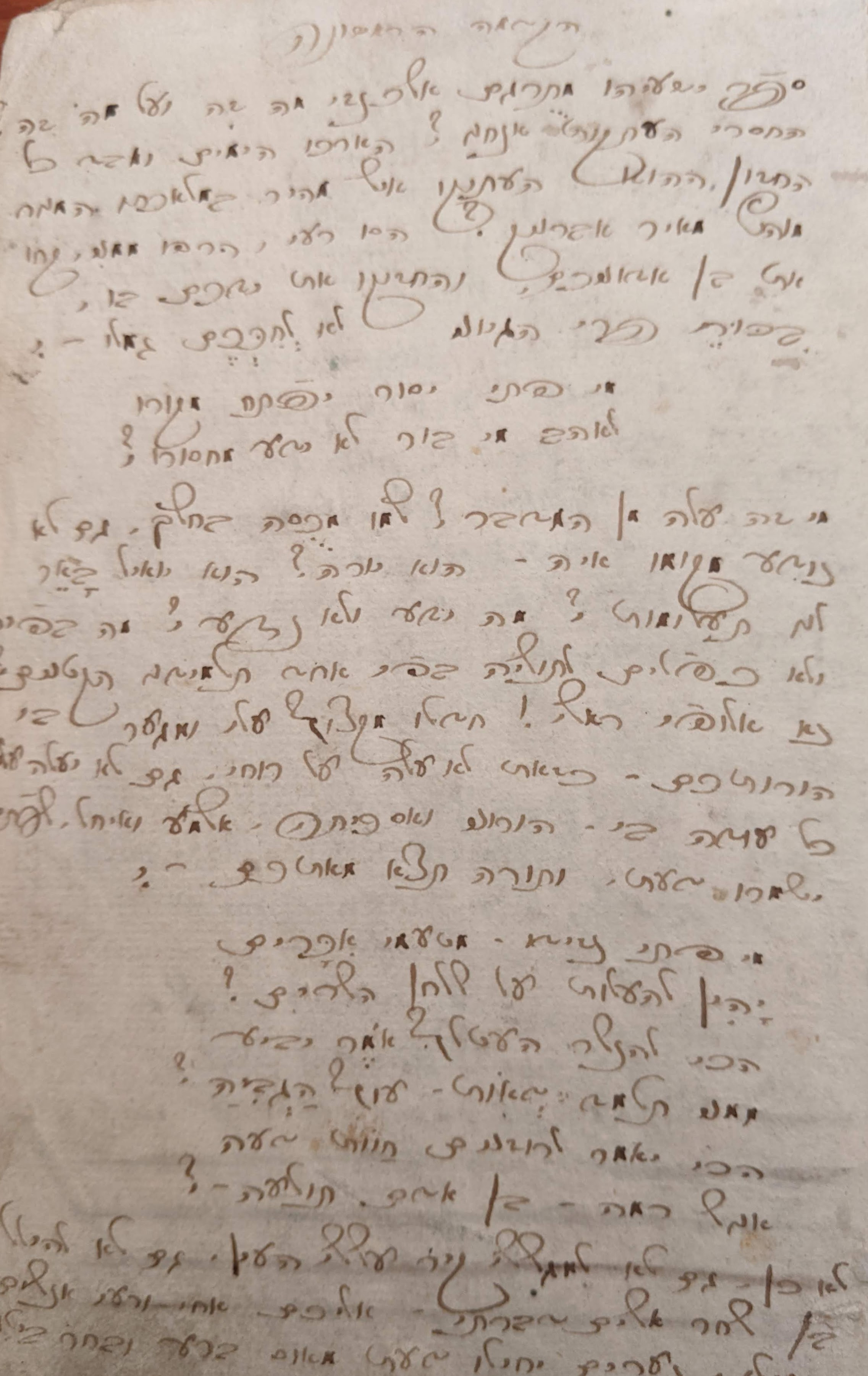
UPenn CAJS Rar MS 537, Heinrich Josefson's handwriting

Heinrich Josefsohn (Hebrew: צבי יאזאפזאהן; c. 1770 – c. 1840) was a Hebrew Bible translator, poet, dramatist from Prague. He was member of the Biurists and the Me'assfim, continuing the Hebrew literary work of Moses Mendelssohn and Hebrew literary figures in Berlin.

Josefson was more religious in philosophy than his peers, specifically David Friedländer, Isaac Satanow and Herz Homberg. He composed a manuscript of a Mendelssohn-style Be'ur on the Book of Isaiah with the Judeo-German translation of Meir Obornik, censored and signed by Carolus (Karl) Fischer, a Semitic scholar and censor in Prague. Josefson criticizes Friedländer harshly in the introduction to the manuscript; unfortunately, this manuscript was never brought to print, despite intentions and work to do so (possibly through repression). This manuscript today is at the University of Pennsylvania Libraries cited as UPenn CAJS Rar Ms. 537. Josefsohn appears to have been in the camps of such as Heinrich Graetz, in direct opposition to Friedländer, who sought a form of conversion of German Jews to Lutheranism, which may explain his repression and obscurity today, despite talent as a poet, Bible translator and elucidator, and author; William Zeitlin did not know of Josefsohn's Biblical work in his citation of his work, indicating possibly repression by those cohorted with David Friedländer.

The only work of Josefsohn to be printed today is a two-part novel called Fegfeuer's sieben Abtheilungen / Shiv'ah midore Gehinom ("The seven degrees of Hell"), printed after his death in Odessa 1870 (the printing had a patron named Jacob Neusatz in Iași). The narrative often pauses for verse and resumes after (in the style of an opera), and the Western-Maskilic adaptation of this style Josefsohn seems to have perfected.
