= Baruch Lindau =

Mathematician, writer and translator

Baruch ben Jehuda Löb Lindau (Hebrew: בָּרוּךְ בֶּן יְהוּדָה לֵייבּ לינדא; 1759, Hanover, Holy Roman Empire – 5 December 1849, Berlin, Prussia) was a Jewish-German mathematician, science writer, and translator.

Lindau became a member of the maskilim circle in Berlin, publishing articles on science and scientific instruments in ha-Me'assef. He was a counselor of the maskilic association Chevrat shocharai Ha'tov ve'hatushiya and translated several haftarot into German for Mendelssohn's Bi'ur project.

In 1789, he published Reshit Limmudim, his most successful work. It was a Hebrew scientific textbook containing sections on astronomy, physics, biology, and geography. The second part, Reshit Limmudim, was published in 1810 and devoted to physics, chemistry, and mechanics. The work remained a popular scientific encyclopedia among European Jews for nearly a century.
