= Breslau (disambiguation) =

Breslau is the German name (and former official appellation) of Wrocław, a city in south-western Poland.

Breslau may also refer to:

- Breslau, Ontario, Canada
- Breslau, Nebraska, U.S.
- Lindenhurst, New York or Breslau, New York, U.S.
- Breslau, Texas, U.S.
- SMS Breslau, a ship of the German Kaiserliche Marine
- Breslau, a German exonym for Braslava, Latvia

== People with the surname ==
- Bernard Bresslaw (1934–1993), British actor
- Ernst Bresslau (1877–1935), German zoologist
- Gertrude Breslau Hunt (1869–1952), American author and lecturer
- Louise Breslau (1856–1927), German/Swiss artist
- Marcus Hyman Bresslau (1807/8–1864), British newspaper editor
- Mendel Breslau (1760–1829), Silesian writer

== Film and television ==
- The Breslau Murders a 2025 Disney+ television series
- The Plagues of Breslau a 2018 Polish crime thriller feature film

== See also ==
- Battle of Breslau (disambiguation)
- Braslav (disambiguation)
