= Breslov (disambiguation) =

Breslov may refer to:

- Bratslav, a town in modern Ukraine
- Breslov (Hasidic group)
  - Breslov Research Institute, a publisher of classic and contemporary Breslov group texts in English

== See also ==
- Breslau (disambiguation)
