= 1782 Edict of Tolerance =

Religious reform of Emperor Joseph II

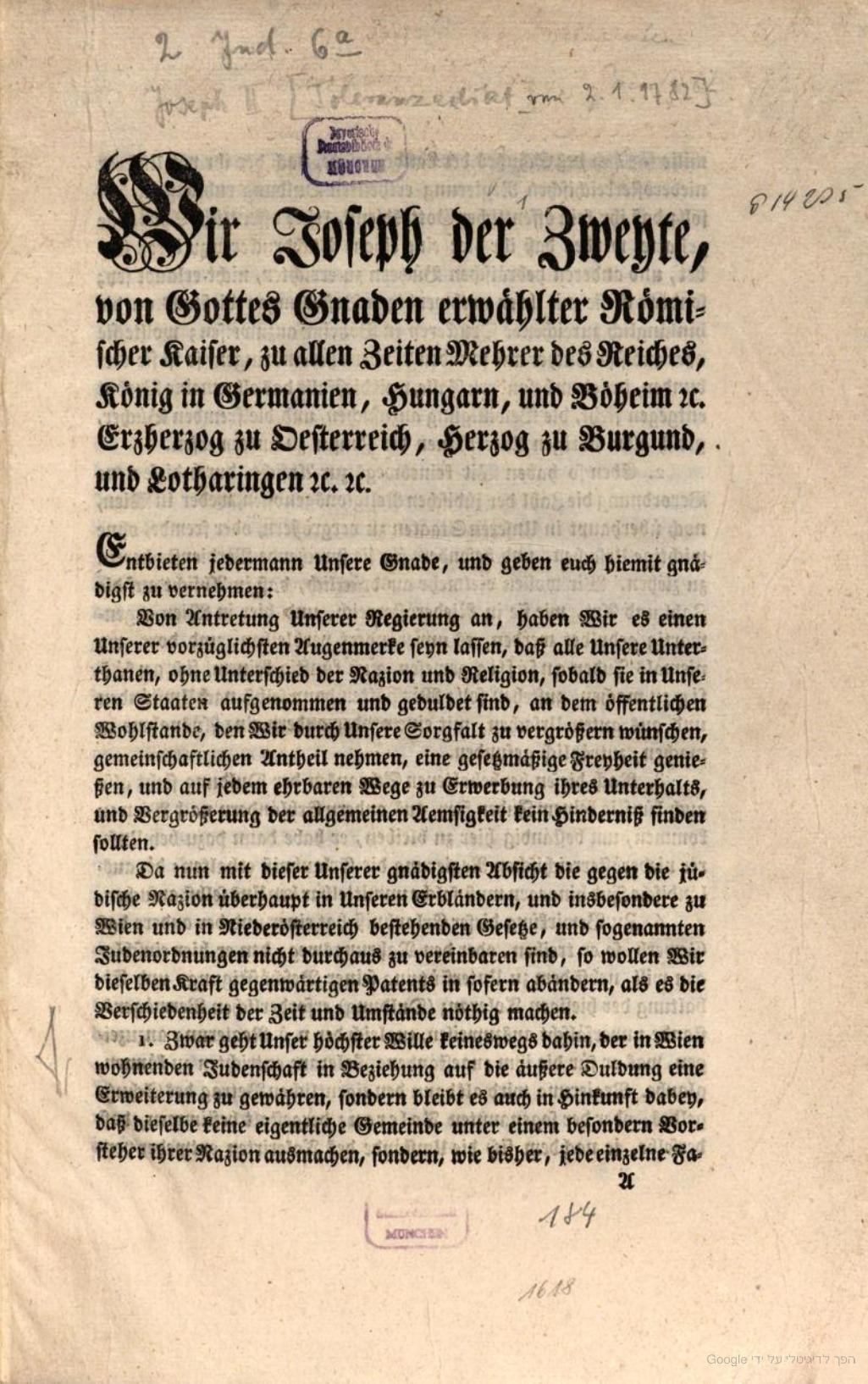
The Edict of Tolerance of 1782

The 1782 Edict of Tolerance (Toleranzedikt vom 1782) was a religious reform of Joseph II while he was emperor of the Habsburg monarchy as part of his policy of Josephinism, a series of drastic reforms to remodel Austria in the form of the ideal Enlightened state. Joseph II's enlightened despotism included the Patent of Toleration, enacted in 1781, and the Edict of Tolerance in 1782. The Patent of Toleration granted religious freedom to the Lutherans, Calvinists, and Serbian Orthodox, but it was not until the 1782 Edict of Tolerance that Joseph II extended religious freedom to the Jewish population.

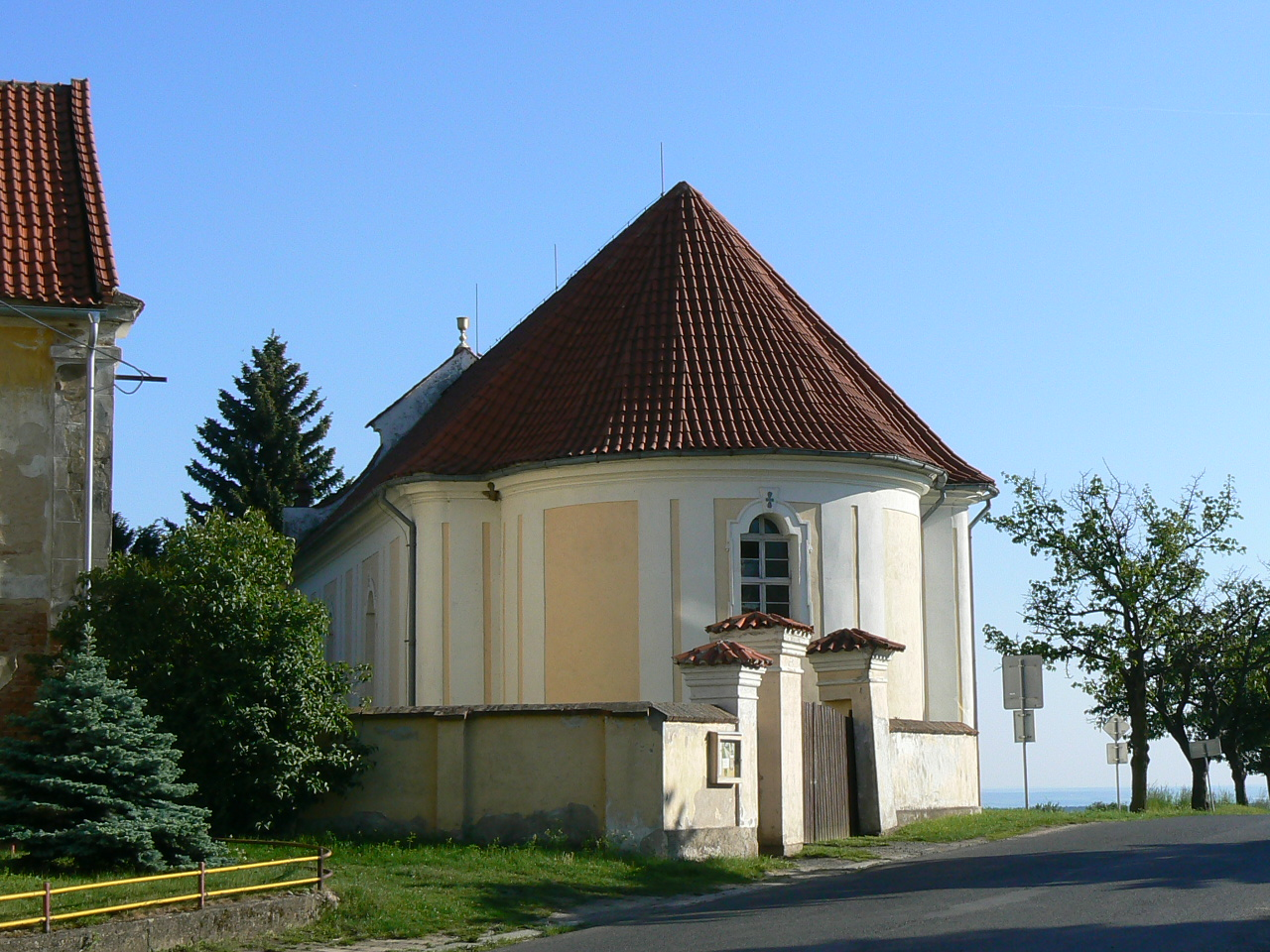
Tolerance church in Vysoká (Bohemia) – without entrance from the street and without tower

== 1781 Patent of Toleration ==
The 1781 Patent of Toleration allowed certain rights and recognized the existence of non-Catholic religions in the Habsburg monarchy. The Edict of Toleration allowed Protestants from other countries without religious tolerance to immigrate to Austria and hold jobs such as pharmacists, carpenters and blacksmiths. The tolerated religions, however, were allowed to have congregations no larger than 100 people in a private home. If a had more than 100 families living in an area, they were allowed to build a church only if it had no direct entrance from the street or visible appearance of being a church. When it came to the case of mixed marriages, there were also laws that had to be followed. If a Catholic man had children with a non-Catholic woman, all children would be raised Catholic. In the case of a Catholic woman with a non-Catholic man, the girls would be raised Catholic, and the boys would be raised non-Catholic.

Scrutiny from Catholic officials occurred in places like Bohemia, where the officials attempted to preserve religious unity. They had printed out all pamphlets that described this edict in German. The population that would be affected, however, generally could not speak or read German.

Serbian Metropolitan Mojsije Putnik translated and published the tolerance patent in Serbian. That meant that there were equal rights for members of the Serbian Orthodox Church and the Catholic Church in Sremski Karlovci.

== Jewish community before the Edict ==
Long before the Jews had been granted religious freedom by Joseph II, they were treated rather harshly by his mother, Maria Theresa, and ostracised by others. During the Middle Ages, Austrian Jews had lived apart from the Christians and had not been allowed by the government to own immovable property. Although that was not the case for the more affluent Jews, those who were wealthy and able to establish factories were recipients of preferential treatment by Maria Theresa, but otherwise, there were restrictions on the rest of the Jewish population. Joseph II was the first to attempt to eliminate those attitudes and sanctions, which affected the majority of the Jewish population.

== 1782 Edict of Tolerance ==
The 1782 Edict of Tolerance was issued on January 2, 1782 and was initially put into effect first in Lower Austria. The prologue to the resolution stated, "This policy paper aims at making the Jewish population useful to the state." This second edict allowed Jewish children to attend schools and universities. It allowed adults to engage in jobs such as being merchants or to open factories. Jews could learn trades but were still not allowed to become master craftsmen. The edict eliminated some previous restrictions, which had forced the Jews to wear gold stars or to pay a tax that was levied only on Jews and cattle. According to the edict, however, the Jewish languages (the written language, Hebrew, and the spoken language, Yiddish) were to be replaced by the national language of the country. Official documents and school textbooks could not be printed in Hebrew. Also immigration of new Jews into Austria was severely restricted.

== See also ==
- Words of Peace and Truth
