= Stolpersteine in Prague-Libeň =

Memorial installations in Czech Republic

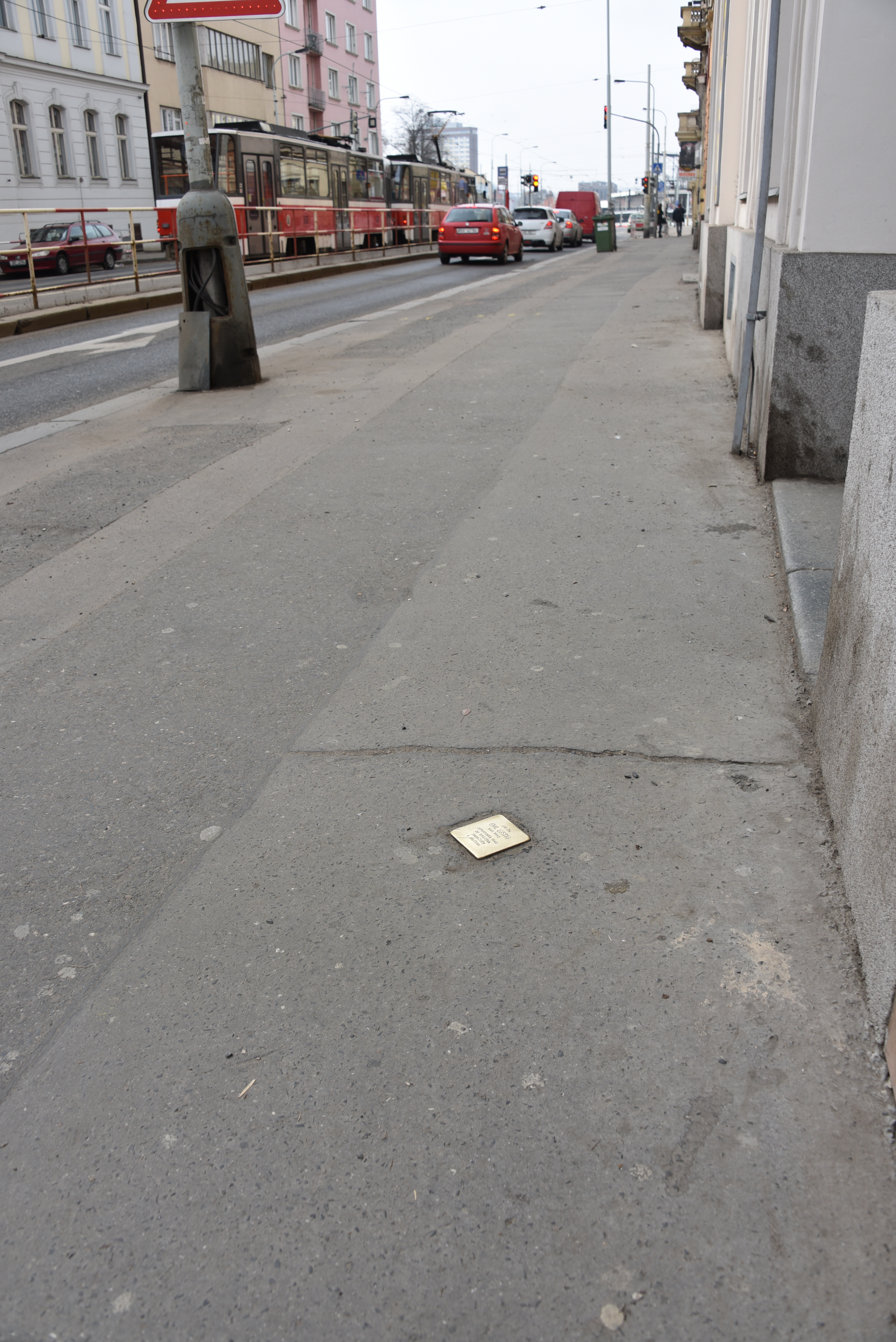
Stolperstein for Emil Lustig in Prague-Libeň

This article lists the Stolpersteine in the Cadastral area and district Libeň (German: Lieben) of Prague. The district has been split off. Since 2002 it belongs mainly to Praha 8, but parts of it are now in Praha 7 and Praha 9. Stolpersteine is the German name for stumbling blocks collocated all over Europe by German artist Gunter Demnig. They remember the fate of the Nazi victims being murdered, deported, exiled or driven to suicide.

Generally, the stumbling blocks are posed in front of the building where the victims had their last self chosen residence. The name of the Stolpersteine in Czech is: Kameny zmizelých.

== Libeň ==
Stone	Inscription	Location	Name and biography
	HERE LIVED; ANTONÍN LÖW; BORN 1933; DEPORTED 1941; TO ŁÓDŹ; MURDERED	Světova 498/3	Antonín Löw was born on 8 November 1933. He was the son of Klára and Dr. Otokar Löw. He had an older brother, František, born in 1930. At age 7, the boy was deported from Prague to Łódź Ghetto by Transport A on 16 October 1941, together with his family. His transport number was 917 of 1,000. There the whole family were murdered by the Nazi regime.
	HERE LIVED; FRANTIŠEK LÖW; BORN 1930; DEPORTED 1941; TO ŁÓDŹ; MURDERED	Světova 498/3	František Löw was born on 16 June 1930. He was the son of Klára and Dr. Otokar Löw. He had a younger brother, Antonín, born in 1933. Together with his family the eleven years old boy was deported from Prague to Łódź Ghetto by Transport A on 16 October 1941. His transport number was 916 of 1,000. There František Löw was murdered by the Nazi regime. Also his brother, his mother and his father were killed.
	HERE LIVED; OTAKAR LÖW; BORN 1894; DEPORTED 1941; TO ŁÓDŹ; MURDERED	Světova 498/3	Dr. Otakar Löw was born on 27 March 1894. He was married to Klara Löwova. The couple had two sons: František, born 1930, and Antonín, born 1933. The last address of the family before deportation was Kaplířova 3 in Praha VIII. The family were deported from Prague to Łódź Ghetto by Transport A on 16 October 1941. His transport number was 914 of 1,000. There Otakar Löw, his wife and his sons perished.
	HERE LIVED; KLÁRA LÖWOVÁ; NÉE STRÁNSKÁ; BORN 1902; DEPORTED 1941; TO ŁÓDŹ; MURDERED	Světova 498/3	Klára Löwová was born on 6 January 1902. She was married to Dr. Otakar Löw. The couple had two sons: František, born 1930, and Antonín, born 1933. The last address of the family before deportation was Kaplířova 3 in Praha VIII. Klára Löwová, her husband and her sons were deported from Prague to Łódź Ghetto by Transport A on 16 October 1941. Her transport number was 915 of 1,000. There the whole family was extinct by the Nazi regime.
	HERE LIVED; EMIL LUSTIG; BORN 1892; DEPORTED 1943; TO THERESIENSTADT; MURDERED; IN AUSCHWITZ	Sokolovská 428/137	Emil Lustig was born on 11 September 1892. He was the son of Ferdinand Lustig and Louise née Kohn and he had one sister. His father died in 1904, his mother in 1926. He married Terezie née Löwy. The couple had two children: Arnošt (born on 21 December 1926 in Prague) and a daughter, whose name is not known. His last residence before deportation was Prague VIII, Královská 137 (in 1948 the street was renamed Sokolovská). He was deported to Theresienstadt concentration camp with Transport Cy on 9 April 1943. His number on this transport was 129 of 150. From there he was deported to Auschwitz concentration camp with Transport El on 29 September 1944. His number on this transport was 1324 of 1500. Emil Lustig was murdered by the Nazi regime in Auschwitz. His sister Marta Picková was murdered after being deported from Theresienstadt to Piaski in 1942. His wife and his son could survive the Shoah. Terezie Lusfigová died in 1984, Arnošt Lustig in 2011. The fate of his daughter is not known.

== Dates of collocations ==
According to the website of Gunter Demnig the Stolpersteine of Prague were posed on 8 October 2008, 7 November 2009, 12 June 2010, 13 to 15 July 2011 and on 17 July 2013 by the artist himself. A further collocation occurred on 28 October 2012, but is not mentioned on Demnig's page. The Stolpersteine of Prague-Libeň were posed before 6 October 2011.

The Czech Stolperstein project was initiated in 2008 by the Česká unie židovské mládeže (Czech Union of Jewish Youth) and was realized with the patronage of the Mayor of Prague.

== See also ==
- List of places with Stolpersteine
- Stolpersteine in the Czech Republic
