= Meshullam Solomon Cohn =

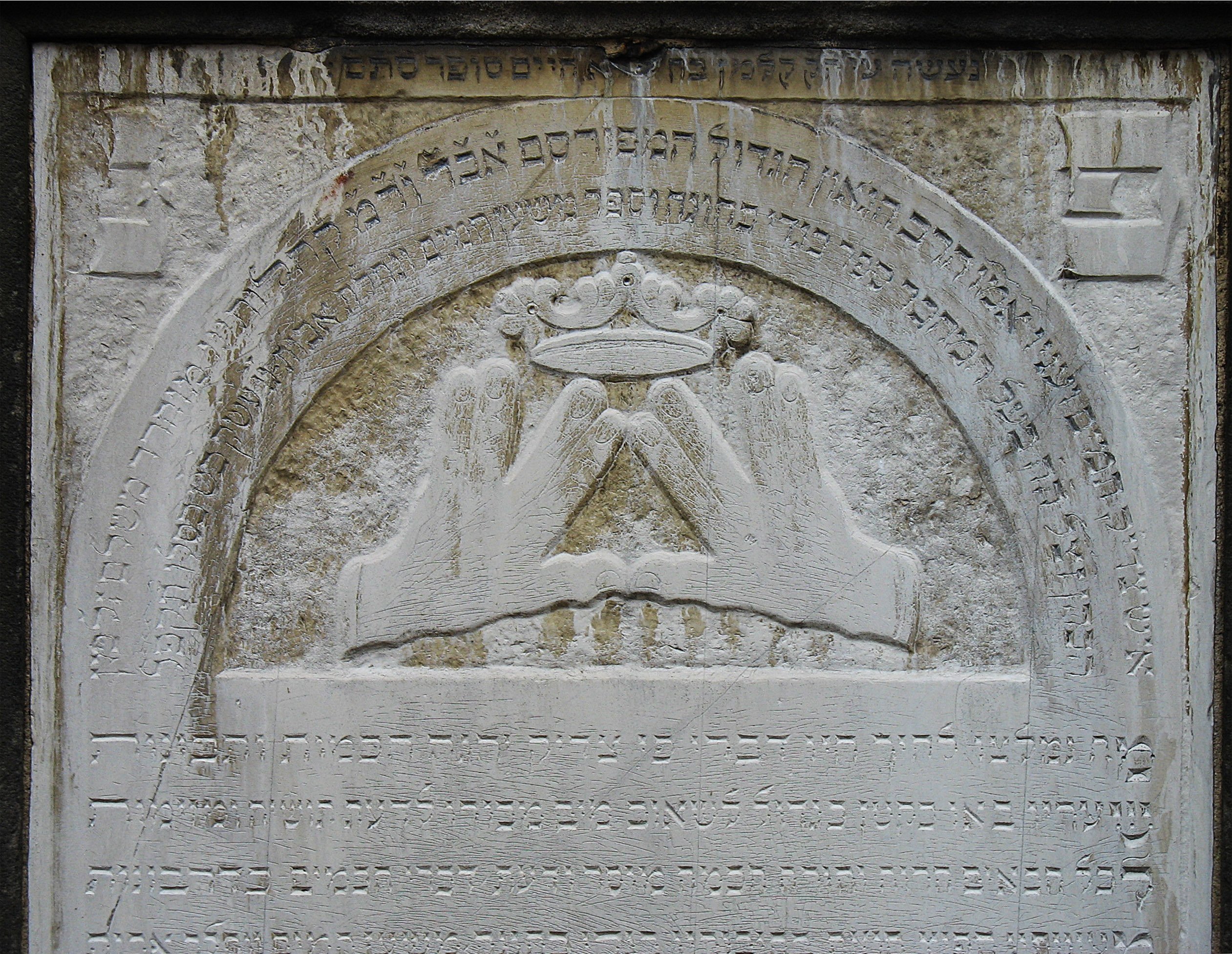
- Cohn's matzevah in Fürth

Personal life
- Born: c. 1739
- Died: 17 December 1819 Fürth, Germany

Religious life
- Religion: Judaism

Meshullam Solomon Cohn (Hebrew: משולם זלמן הכהן; c. 1739 – 17 December 1819) was a German rabbi and author.

== Biography ==
Meshullam Solomon Cohn was born around 1739. He studied for several years at the yeshivot of Posen and Zülz before entering the yeshivah of Jonathan Eybeschütz in Altona, where he received rabbinical ordination.

His first rabbinical post was in Rawitsch, where he also established a small Talmudical college. He later served as rabbi in Krotoschin, Zülz, and Kempten. In 1785 he succeeded Hirsch Janow as rabbi of Fürth, a position he held until his death there on 17 December 1819.

Cohn's son, Solomon Cohn, served as rabbi in Schnaittach and Mergentheim, and later in Zülz, where he died on 1 April 1824.

== Work ==
In 1800 Cohn was among the signatories of a declaration against the Frankists of Offenbach. In 1811 he pronounced a ban against Löw Berlin, rabbi of Kassel, for permitting the consumption of legumes during Passover.

Cohn published several works, including:

- Sefer Bigde Kehunnah ('Garments of Priesthood'; Fürth, 1807), a collection of responsa. The second part contains novellae on Bava Metzia and Gittin.
- Sefer Mishʿan ha-Ḥayyim ('Prop of the Waters'; Fürth, 1811), haggadic treatises.
- Naḥlat Avot ('Portion of the Fathers'; Fürth, 1811), homilies.

A sermon delivered by Cohn on completing the study of Gittin was published in Fürth in 1791.
