= Wolf Heidenheim =

German exegete and grammarian

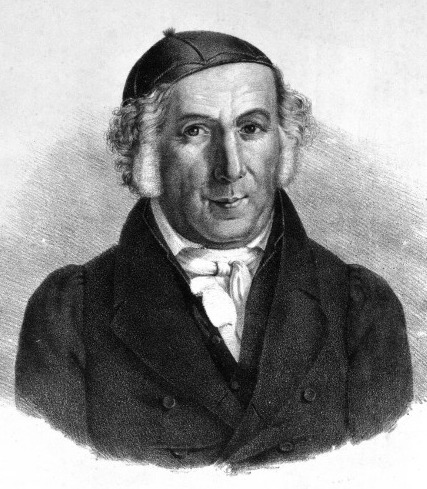
- Born: 1757; Heidenheim, Principality of Ansbach
- Died: 23 February 1832 (aged 74–75); Rödelheim, Hesse
- Writing career
- Literary movement: Haskalah

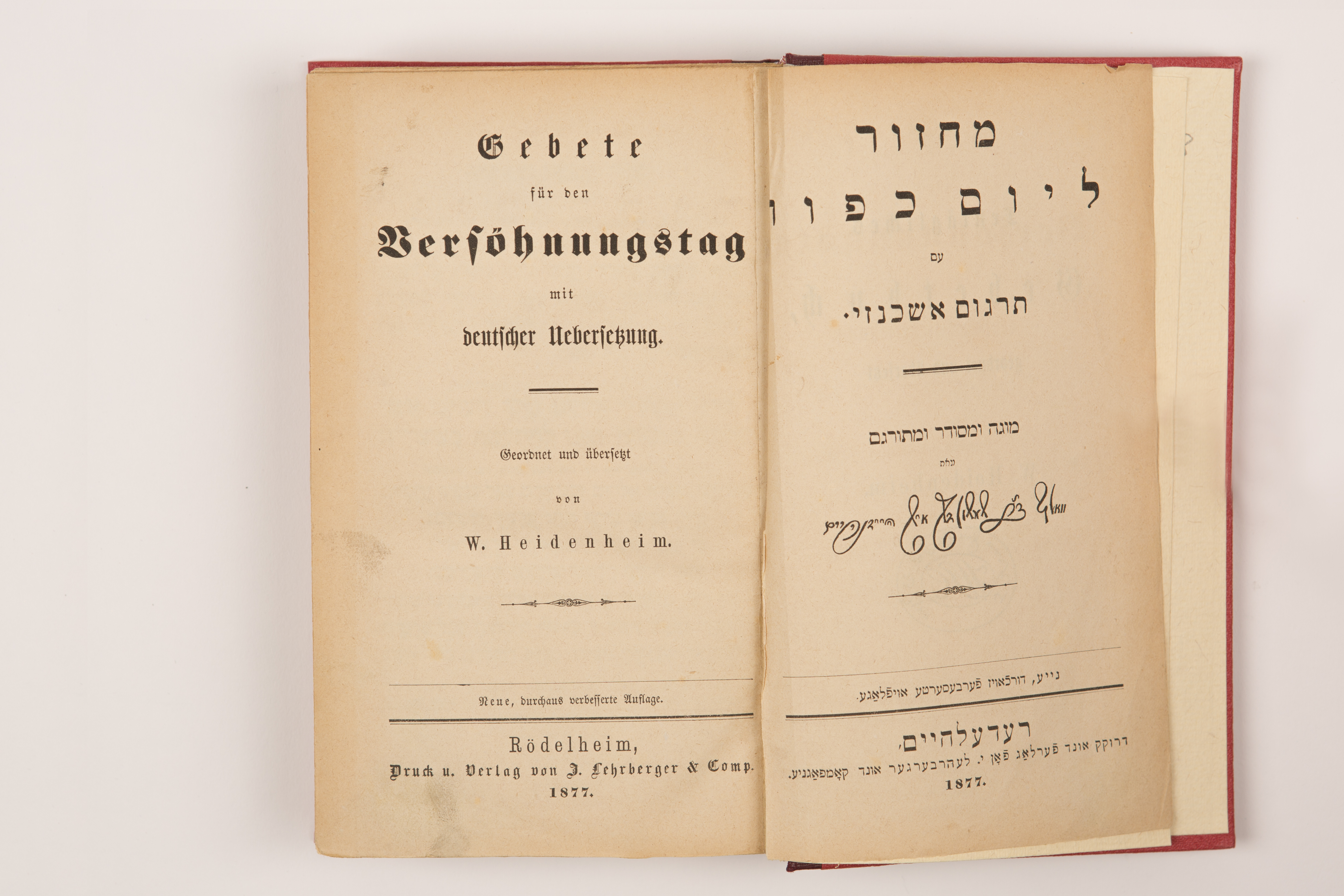
Prayers for Yom Kippur with German translation by W. Heidenheim, 1877. In the collection of the Jewish Museum of Switzerland.

Benjamin Wolf ben Samson Heidenheim (Hebrew: בנימין זאב בן שמשון היידנהיים; 1757 – February 23, 1832) was a German exegete and grammarian.

== Biography ==
=== Early life ===
Born at Heidenheim, at an early age Heidenheim was sent to Fürth, where he studied Talmud under Joseph Steinhardt (author of Zikron Yosef) and, from 1777, under Hirsch Janow. Besides Talmudic literature, Heidenheim devoted himself to the study of Hebrew grammar, and particularly of the Masorah. In 1782 he left Fürth, probably on account of Janow's opposition to Mendelssohn's translation of the Pentateuch, of which Heidenheim was an admirer. He went to Frankfurt, where he made the acquaintance of the most prominent scholars, among them Wolf Breidenbach and Solomon Dubno. There began his literary activity, which lasted fifty years.

=== Career ===
Heidenheim, encouraged by Dubno, conceived the idea of issuing a revised edition of the Pentateuch, with a commentary of his own. The first work edited by him was Abraham ibn Ezra's Moznayim, to which he added a critical commentary (Offenbach, 1791). Seven years later Heidenheim began his critical edition of the Pentateuch, which he titled Sefer Torat Elohim. It contained the Targum, the commentaries of Rashi and Rashbam, the Minḥat Shai of Solomon Norzi, his own glosses and Masoretic references, and his supercommentary on Rashi, Havanat ha-Mikra. He based his commentary chiefly on the accents, adding numerous grammatical notes. But the undertaking, on the business side, was too difficult for him alone, and he was compelled to stop at Genesis 43:16.

He next entered into partnership with Baruch Baschwitz, an energetic business man; through the assistance of Breidenbach they obtained from the Count of Solms-Rödelheim, under favorable conditions, a license to establish a printing-press at Rödelheim, where they relocated in 1799. Heidenheim immediately began an edition of the Maḥzor, with a Hebrew commentary by himself and a German translation by himself and Breidenbach (1800). In order to give a correct text, Heidenheim had secured the most ancient manuscripts, among them being one of the year 1258, as well as the earliest Italian and German editions. At the end of the Maḥzor to Shemini Aẓeret there is printed Heidenheim's Ha-Piyyutim veha-Payetanim, an essay on the liturgists. In 1806, Baschwitz having withdrawn, Heidenheim became sole proprietor. In that year he published his Mevo ha-lashon, a treatise on Hebrew grammar, and in 1808 his Sefer Mishpete ha-ta'amim, a treatise on the accents according to the ancient grammarians.

Ten years later Heidenheim recommenced his edition of the Pentateuch, but with a larger scope. It was published in four separate editions between 1818 and 1821. The first edition, Me'or 'enayim, contains the text, the commentary En ha-kore, and the author's treatise (En ha-sofer) on the square characters. The second, Moda la-binah, contains the text, the commentary of Rashi, and the author's supercommentary. The third edition, Tikkun sofer, is an unvocalized text for scribes, and the last contains the text, with a German translation, and a commentary titled Minḥah ḥadashah.

He also added valuable notes to various works which issued from his press, among them being the Mebo ha-Mishnah of Maimonides, and Solomon Papenheim's Yeri'ot Shelomoh. He left more than a dozen unpublished works, mostly on Hebrew grammar.

== Other publications ==
- The Pesaḥ Haggadah (German transl.; 1822)
- The Pirḳe Abot (German transl.; 1823)
- Siddur Safah Berurah, the daily prayers with a German translation (before 1800)
- Ma'aseh Ta'tu'im, a polemic against the Kabbalist Nathan Adler (anonymous, but ascribed to Heidenheim)
- Seder Tish'ah be-Ab (German transl., with notes; 1826)
- Seliḥot (German transl., with a Hebrew commentary; 1834)
- Festtägliches Gebetbuch, hebräisch und deutsch. Geordnet und übersetzt von W. Heidenheim
  - מחזור לחג הסכות ולשבת שבתוכו בלשון עברית ואשכנזית – Gebete am Succothfest, in hebräischer und deutscher Sprache (9th ed., Rödelheim, 1838 (google, google))
  - [Hebrew] – Gebete am Schemini-Azerethfest, in hebräischer und deutscher Sprache (9th ed., Rödelheim, 1838)
  - [Hebrew] – Gebete am Neuen Jahr, in hebräischer und deutscher Sprache (9th ed., Rödelheim, 1838 (google); 10th ed., Rödelheim, 1847 (google, google))
    - מחזור ליום שני של ראש השנה בלשון עברית ואשכנזית – Gebete am Neuen Jahr, in hebräischer und deutscher Sprache (11th ed., Rödelheim, 1854 (google))
  - [Hebrew] – Gebete am Versöhnungstag, in hebräischer und deutscher Sprache (10th ed., Rödelheim, 1847 (google))
- Festtägliches Gebetbuch, geordnet und übersetzt von W. Heidenheim
  - [Hebrew] – Gebete für das Schluß- u. Freudenfest mit deutscher Uebersetzung (new ed., Rödelheim, 1864 (google))
  - מחזור לחג השבועות עם תרגום אשכנזי – Gebete für das Wochenfest mit deutscher Uebersetzung (new ed., Rödelheim, 1864 (google))
  - [Hebrew] – Gebete für den Versöhnungsabend, mit deutscher Uebersetzung (new ed., Rödelheim, 1870 (google))
  - מחזור ליום שני של ראש השנה עם תרגום אשכנזי – Gebete für das Neujahrsfest mit deutscher Uebersetzung (new ed., Rödelheim, 1870 (google))
  - [Hebrew] – Gebete für das Peßachfest mit deutscher Uebersetzung (new ed., Rödelheim, 1872 (google))
