= Joel Löwe =

German Bible commentator

Joel Löwe (Hebrew: יואל לֶוֶוה; 1760 – February 11, 1802, Breslau), best known by the pen name Joel Bril (Hebrew: יואל ברי״ל; Bril being an acronym for "son of R. Judah Löb"), was a German Biblical commentator.

== Biography ==
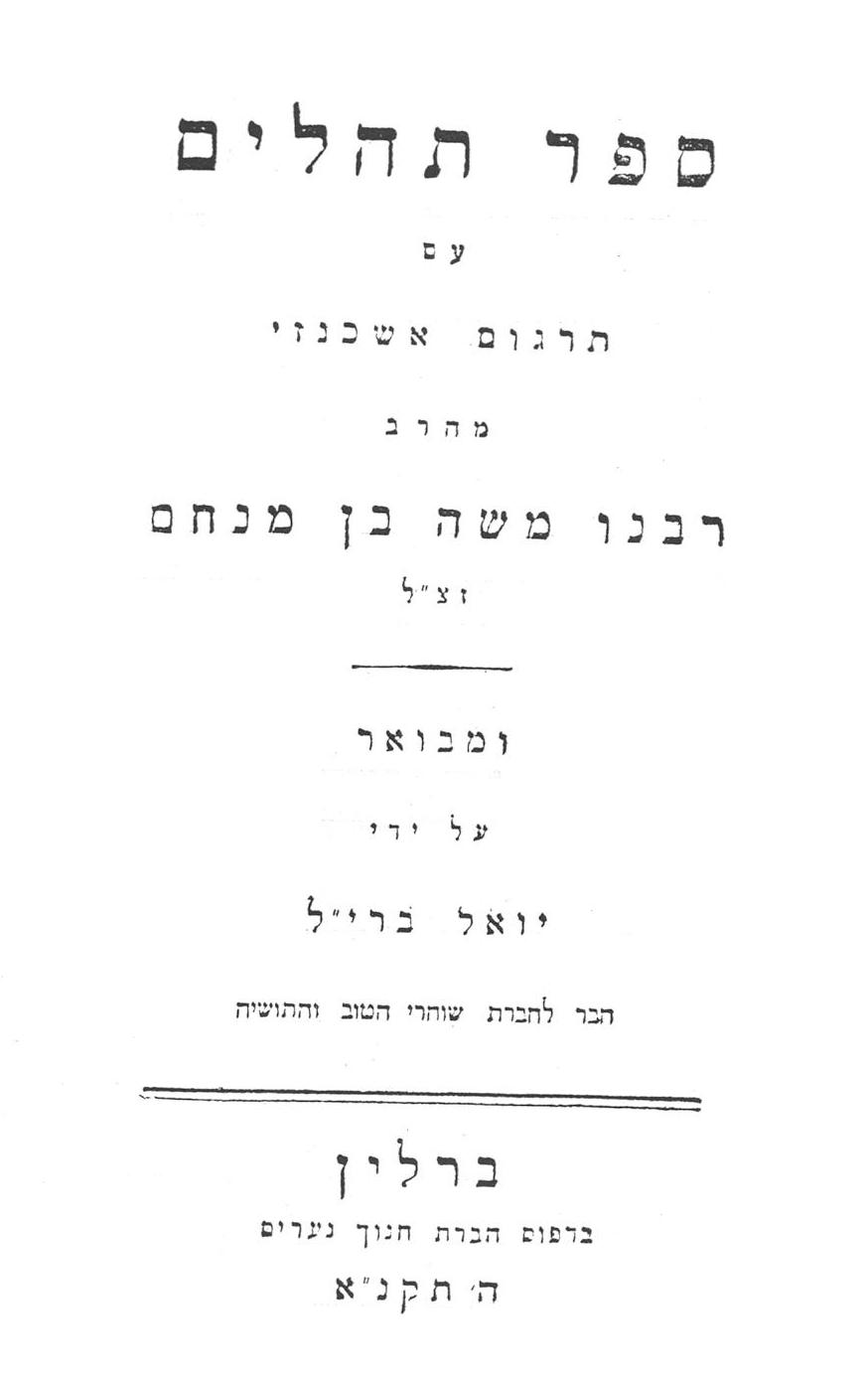
Edition of Psalms containing Löwe's commentary

At the age of twenty he went to Berlin, where he received instruction from Isaac Satanow, who was a follower of Moses Mendelssohn. In Berlin Löwe met Mendelssohn, his acquaintance with whom soon ripened into friendship. Mendelssohn's influence was doubtless instrumental in securing for Löwe the position of tutor in the house of the influential David Friedländer. Löwe became a most intimate friend of another prominent Mendelssohnian, Isaac Abraham Euchel, whose first work, a Hebrew biography of Mendelssohn, contains a dedicatory letter addressed to Löwe. At the close of his life Löwe was principal of the Wilhelms-Schule in Breslau.

Löwe was an excellent Hebraist, grammarian, and exegete, and, like most Mendelssohnians, was also a "Schöngeist" (bel esprit). Jointly with Aaron Wolfsohn he edited Ha-Meassef, in which periodical he published a large number of poems and essays.

== Work ==
Löwe belonged to the bi'urists who assisted Mendelssohn in his commentaries on the Bible. His own main work was a critical Hebrew commentary and an excellent introduction to the Psalms (1788), which latter forms a history of Biblical poetry; and he published, also, Mendelssohn's German translation of the Psalms in Hebrew letters.

In company with Aaron Wolfsohn, Löwe published Mendelssohn's German translation of the Song of Solomon with a Hebrew commentary. He was the first to translate the Haggadah shel Pesaḥ into German (1785). Of his 'Ammude ha-Lashon, on the elements of the Hebrew language, only the first part was published (1794).

He wrote also on chronology, and was a contributor to Johann Gottfried Eichhorn's Allgemeine Bibliothek der Biblischen Literatur. His plan to publish a Hebrew grammar on a large scale did not materialize.
