= Mendel Bresslau =

Silesian Hebraist (1760–1829)

- Born: 1760
- Died: 1829 (aged 68–69)
- Writing career
- Language: Hebrew
- Literary movement: Haskalah

Mendel ben Ḥayyim Judah Bresslau (Yiddish: מענדל בן חיים יהודה ברעסלוי; 1760–1829) was a Silesian Hebraist, writer, and bookseller.

Along with fellow Maskil Isaac Abraham Euchel, he founded language in Königsberg the Me'assefim society for the promotion of the Hebrew. He published numerous articles in the organization's periodical, Ha-Me'assef ('The Collector').

Among other works, Bresslau was the author of an allegorical ethical dialogue, Yaldut u-baḥarut ('Childhood and Youth'; Berlin, 1786). He also wrote Gelilot Eretz Israel, a geography of the Land of Israel with two maps (Breslau, 1819), and Reshit ha-keriah (Breslau, 1834), a Hebrew reader and grammar with the phonetic method.

== Selected publications ==
- Yaldut u-baḥarut [Childhood and Youth] (in Hebrew). Berlin: Ḥevrat ḥinukh naʻarim. 1786.
- Gelilot Eretz Israel (in Hebrew). Breslau: L. Zultsbakh. 1819.
