= Braslav =

Braslav may refer to:

- Braslav, Duke of Lower Pannonia (fl. 882–896), a Frankish Slavic governor
- Braslaw (Braslaŭ, Braslav), a town in Belarus
- Braslav Rabar (1919–1973), Croatian chess player

== See also ==
- Bratslav
- Bratislav
- Breslau (disambiguation)
