= Solomon ben Moses Chelm =

Personal life
- Born: c. 1717 Samoscz, Polish–Lithuanian Commonwealth
- Died: 13 July 1781 Salonica, Ottoman Greece

Religious life
- Religion: Judaism

Jewish leader
- Main work: Merkevet ha-mishneh
- Yahrtzeit: 21 Tammuz 5541

Solomon ben Moses Chelm (Hebrew: שְׁלֹמֹה בֵּן מֹשֶׁה מִחֶלְמָא, romanized: Shlomo ben Moshe mi-Ḥelma; c. 1717 – 14 July 1781) was a Polish rabbi, best known for his multi-volume work Merkevet ha-mishneh. Alongside his expertise in rabbinics, he was distinguished as a grammarian and mathematician. He is considered one of the first Maskilim in Poland.

== Biography ==
Solomon ben Moses Chelm was born in Samoscz, then part of the Polish–Lithuanian Commonwealth. He received a traditional Jewish education under his father, but also acquired extensive knowledge in secular subjects like algebra, engineering, astronomy, philosophy, grammar, logic, and modern languages. At a young age he married Pesa, daughter of Moses Parnas, head of the Jewish community of Lissa.

Solomon's first rabbinical appointment was in Chelm, serving the Jewish community of that city and its nine satellite communities. There he wrote the first part of his main work, Merkevet ha-mishneh, for which he quickly earned widespread esteem. He was appointed rabbi of his hometown in 1767, and succeeded Ḥayyim ha-Kohen Rapoport as rabbi of Lemberg in 1771.

Chelm was involved in Get of Cleves dispute, in which he sided against the rabbis of Frankfurt. He also participated in the 1742, 1751 and 1753 rulings of the Council of Four Lands.

In 1777, he left Lemberg to embark on a journey to the Land of Israel, stopping in Smyrna and Constantinople. He spent some time in Tiberias, apparently coming into conflict with local Hasidic communities as well as the Ottoman authorities. From there he went to Salonica in 1781, where he planned to oversee the publication of the second and third volumes of Merkevet ha-mishneh. He and his wife died of the plague shortly after their arrival in that city.

== Work ==
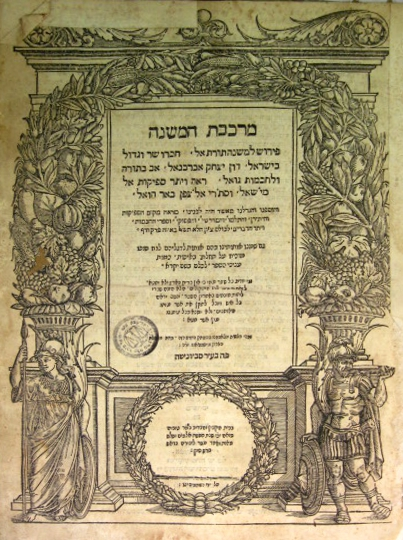
Title page of Merkevet ha-mishneh, Solomon Chelm's commentary on Maimonides' Yad

Solomon Chelm's main literary contribution is his Merkevet ha-mishneh (Frankfort-on-the-Oder, 1751), containing novellæ on the four divisions of Maimonides' Yad. A second edition, revised and published in three parts (Salonica, 1777–78), includes a defense of Maimonides against the strictures of Abraham ben David.

His other rabbinic works include Shulḥan atze shitim (Berlin, 1762), novellæ on the laws of Shabbat; Sha'are Ne'imah (Frankfort-on-the-Oder, 1766), a treatise on accentuation in the Nevi'im, edited by his student Solomon Dubno; Berakhot be-ḥeshbon, a pamphlet on Talmudic arithmetic and geometry; and Tzintzenet ha-man, on aggadah in the Talmud. His unpublished works include Ḥug ha-aretz, on the geography of Palestine; Asarah shulḥanot, novellæ on the four parts of the Shulḥan Arukh; and Lev Shelomoh, a collection of thirty-two responsa. Many of his responsa are to be found in responsa collections of other rabbis.

Solomon also provided his approbation for the publication of numerous contemporary works, especially during his tenure in Lemberg.

=== Selected publications ===
- Merkevet ha-mishneh. Vol. 1. Frankfort-on-the-Oder. 1751.
- Berakhot be-ḥeshbon. 1751.
- Tzintzenet ha-man. 1751.
- Shulḥan atze shitim. Berlin. 1762.
- Sha'are ne'imah. Frankfort-on-the-Oder. 1766.
- Merkevet ha-mishneh. Vol. 2. Salonica. 1782.
- Merkevet ha-mishneh. Vol. 3. Salonica. 1782.
- Lev Shelomoh. Jerusalem: Mossad ha-Rav Kook. 1972.
- Ḥug ha-aretz. Jerusalem: Frank Institute. 1988.
