= Words of Peace and Truth =

1782 work by Naphtali Herz Wessely

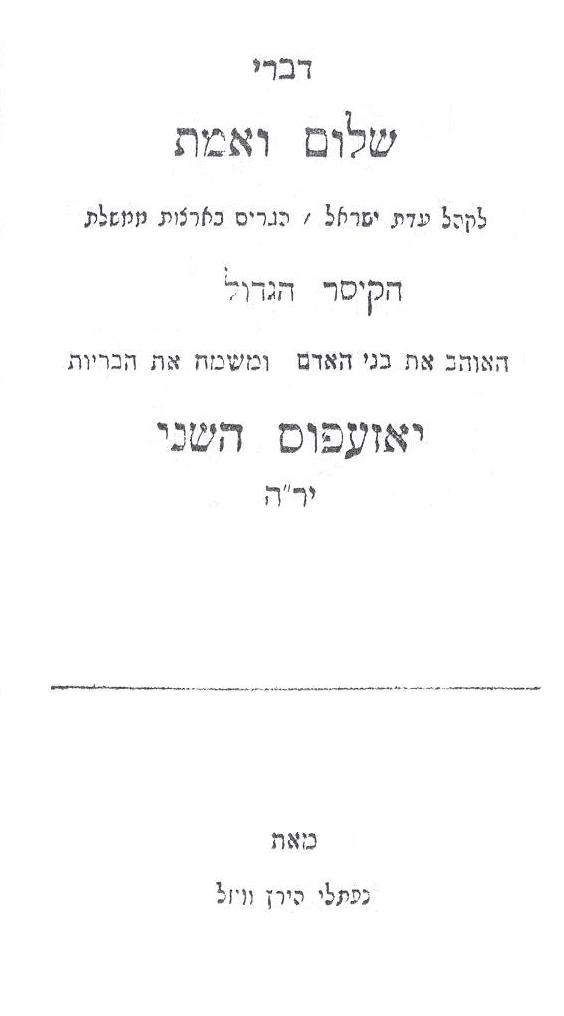
- Author: Naphtali Hirz Wessely
- Original title: דברי שלום ואמת
- Published: 1782

Words of Peace and Truth (Hebrew: דברי שלום ואמת) was a Hebrew work produced by the Jewish scholar Naphtali Herz Wessely, an associate of Moses Mendelssohn and a prominent figure of the Haskalah.

Published in 1782, the tract aimed to encourage Jews in Central Europe to accept the 1782 Edict of Tolerance, issued by Emperor Joseph II of Austria, which sought to promote a greater degree of acculturation and secularization among the Jewish community. The text was geared particularly toward rabbinic leadership.

Wessely wishes to convince the rabbinic authorities that the spread of secular education would be to the benefit of the Jewish community and should not be feared. He essentially differentiates two different kinds of knowledge: Torat Ha-Elohim (divine, or religious knowledge) and Torat Ha-Adam (human, or secular knowledge). While both components are necessary, Wessely argues that the acquisition of secular education must precede the acquisition of divine knowledge; ultimately, secular learning is a universal body of knowledge and to be supplemented by the religious instruction of the Torah.

In many ways, Wessely's reprioritization of education was contrary to traditional Jewish practice. The study of secular subjects first and the Torah second seemed repugnant to many rabbis, who denounced the work in harsh terms. In Vilna, the book was burned publicly, but in Italy and other places, it was applauded as an enlightened and legitimate work.
