= Baruch Jeitteles =

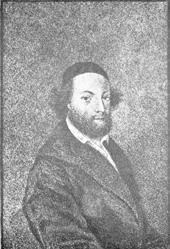
Baruch Jeitteles

Baruch Jeitteles (Hebrew: ברוך ייטלס) (22 April 1762 – 18 December 1813) was a Jewish scholar, writer, and doctor from Bohemia, associated with the Jewish Enlightenment movement (Haskalah). His teachers were Rabbi Yechezkel Landau of Prague and later Moses Mendelssohn of Berlin.

== Overview ==
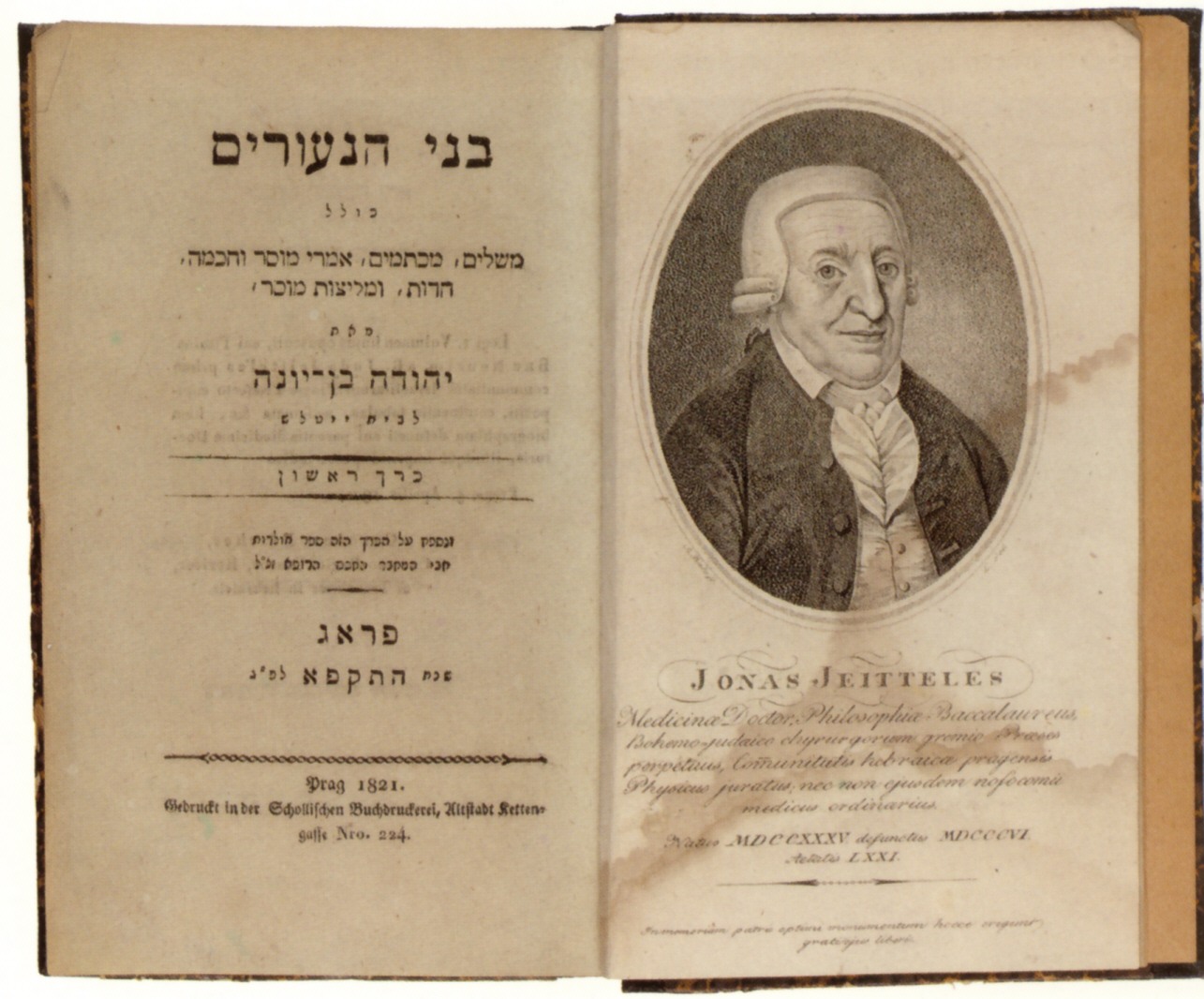
Portrait of Jeitteles' father Jonas

Baruch Jeitteles was born on 22 April 1762, in Prague. His father, Jonas Jeitteles, was a doctor. Originally a student of Rabbi Yechezkel Landau, Jeitteles travelled to Berlin and studied with Moses Mendelssohn, the foundational figure in the Jewish Enlightenment movement. Jeitteles later returned to Prague and appeared to reconcile with Landau, and adhered to a moderate stance on Jewish Enlightenment issues. Using inherited wealth from his father-in-law, Samuel Porges, Jeitteles established a private rabbinical school and training students from Moravia and Hungary. One of his students was Moshe Kunitz, author of the books Ben Yochai which defends the attribution of the Zohar to Rabbi Shimon bar Yochai.

His son, Ignaz Jeitteles, was a philosopher and co-founder of a Jewish weekly, "Siona".

As a doctor, Jeitteles was a proponent of the smallpox vaccination. During the War of the Sixth Coalition, and following the 1813 battles in Dresden and Kulm, Jeitteles persuaded local Jews to support a private hospital for the caring of wounded and ill soldiers. Jeitteles personally cared for the sick and soon died on 18 December 1813, in Prague.

== Works ==
- Emek ha-bakha (1793) — an obituary in memory of Yechezkel Landau
- Sefer Ha-Orev (Vienna, 1795) — a work attacking the radical wing of the Jewish Enlightenment movement
- Sichah ben Shenat 5560 ve-5561 (Prague, 1800) — a polemical work against the followers of Jacob Frank in Prague
- Die Kuhpockenimpfung (Prague, 1804) — a sermon on behalf of his father's campaign for the smallpox vaccination

Jeitteles also wrote for Ha-Me’asef, a Jewish scholarly and literary periodical, during the 1780s and 1790s, and for a Jewish-German monthly published in Prague in 1802.

== See also ==
- Alois Jeitteles
