= Aaron Jarosław =

Aaron ben Zechariah Friedenthal of Jarosław (Yiddish: אהרן פרידנטהאל בן זכריה מיארעסלאוו; fl. late 18th century), also known as simply Aaron Jarosław, was a Galician Maskilic writer, editor, and publisher. He was a member of Moses Mendelssohn's Biurist school of Biblical exegesis.

== Biography ==
Aaron Friedenthal was born in Jarosław, Galicia, and studied at Berlin. He was a tutor in the house of Moses Mendelssohn; afterwards, he returned to Galicia to serve as a teacher in the new Jewish schools, eventually becoming a director of the Galician state educational system.

Friedenthal's commentary on the Book of Numbers appeared in the first edition of Mendelssohn's Pentateuch (Netivot ha-Shalom, Berlin, 1783) and was included in all subsequent editions. He edited the third edition of Maimonides's Beʾur Millot ha-Higgayon ('Words of Logic'), with Moses Mendelssohn's Hebrew commentary (Berlin, 1784). He also published the first posthumous editions (Lemberg, 1790 and 1791), with a new preface.
