= Alois Jeitteles =

Austrian doctor, journalist and writer

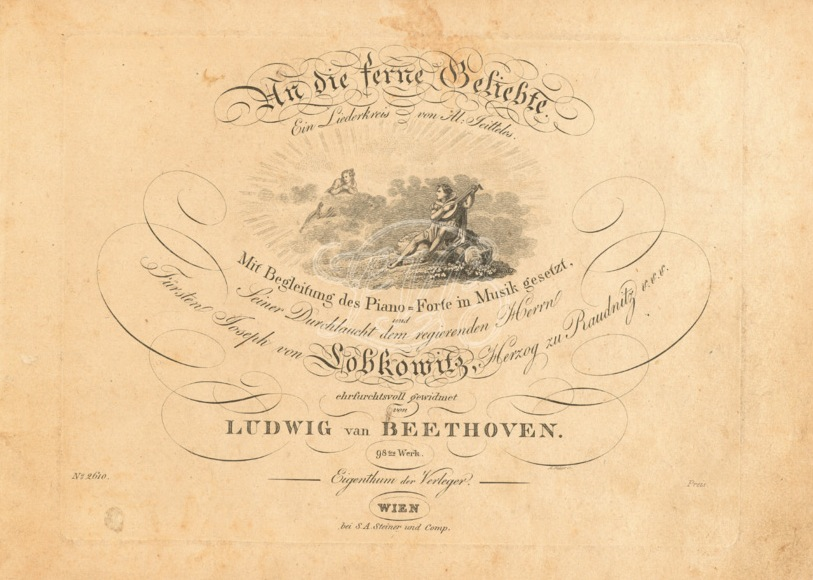
Title page of Beethoven's An die ferne Geliebte, his setting of Jeitteles's poems

Alois Isidor Jeitteles (20 June 1794 – 16 April 1858) was an Austrian medical doctor, journalist and writer, best known for Ludwig van Beethoven's setting of his poem sequence, An die ferne Geliebte.

== Life ==
Jeitteles was born in Brünn (now Brno), to a Jewish family with a medical and rabbinic tradition. He studied philosophy in Prague and Brünn and medicine in Vienna. In 1819 he opened a medical practice in Brünn. He published poetry in the pamphlets "Selam" (1812–1817) and "Aglaja" (1815–1832). With his cousin Ignaz Jeitteles he founded the Jewish weekly "Siona" in 1818. In the same year he collaborated with Ignaz Franz Castelli on "Der Schicksalsstrumpf", a parody of the fashionable de:Schicksalstragödie or tragedy of fate. Jeitteles made numerous translations, including the Spanish comedy Die Macht des Blutes (Spanish title: La fuerza de la sangre) by Agustin Moreto as well as several French plays.

From 1848 to his death he edited the newspaper the "Brünner Zeitung".

Jeitteles died in Brünn and was buried in Brno Jewish Cemetery.

His daughter was the suffragette de:Ottilie Bondy (1832–1921). He also had two sons, Richard and Robert.

== An die ferne Geliebte ==
Jeitteles's poetic sequence An die ferne Geliebte (To the Distant Beloved), written in 1815 when he was 21, was set in 1816 as a song cycle by Ludwig van Beethoven, who was acquainted with both Alois and his cousin Ignaz. Beethoven's early biographer Anton Schindler recorded that Beethoven thanked Jeitteles for the inspiration he provided, but it is not clear whether Jeitteles wrote the poems specifically for Beethoven or whether Beethoven first saw them on publication.

== See also ==
- Baruch Jeitteles

== Publications ==
- Sieg, Friede, Heimkehr. Bey Gelegenheit der ... Rückkehr ... des Kaisers, Brünn: Trailer, 1814
- Die Hausgenossen. Lustspiel, Leipzig : Andrä, 1843
- Moderne Walpurgisnacht, Brünn: C. Winiker, 1848

== Sources ==
- Rieder, Heinz (1974a). "Jeit(t)eles". Neue Deutsche Biographie (in German). Vol. 10. Berlin: Duncker & Humblot. p. 387. (full text online).
- Rieder, Heinz (1974b). "Jeit(t)eles, Alois". Neue Deutsche Biographie (in German). Vol. 10. Berlin: Duncker & Humblot. p. 388. (full text online).
- Thayer, Alexander Wheelock, rev. and edited Elliot Forbes (1967). "Thayer's Life of Beethoven". Princeton: Princeton University Press. ISBN 9780691027180
