= Joseph Haltern =

- Died: September 5, 1818; Berlin, Prussia, German Confederation
- Writing career
- Language: Hebrew
- Literary movement: Haskalah

Joseph Haltern (Yiddish: יוסף האלטערן; died 5 September 1818) (Note: 1817, according to some sources.) was a translator of German literature into Hebrew and a member of the Me'assefim. Among other works, Haltern wrote Esther, a Hebrew adaptation of Jean Racine's drama of the same name, and published a translation of Gellert's fables.
