= Meir Obernik =

Biblical commentator

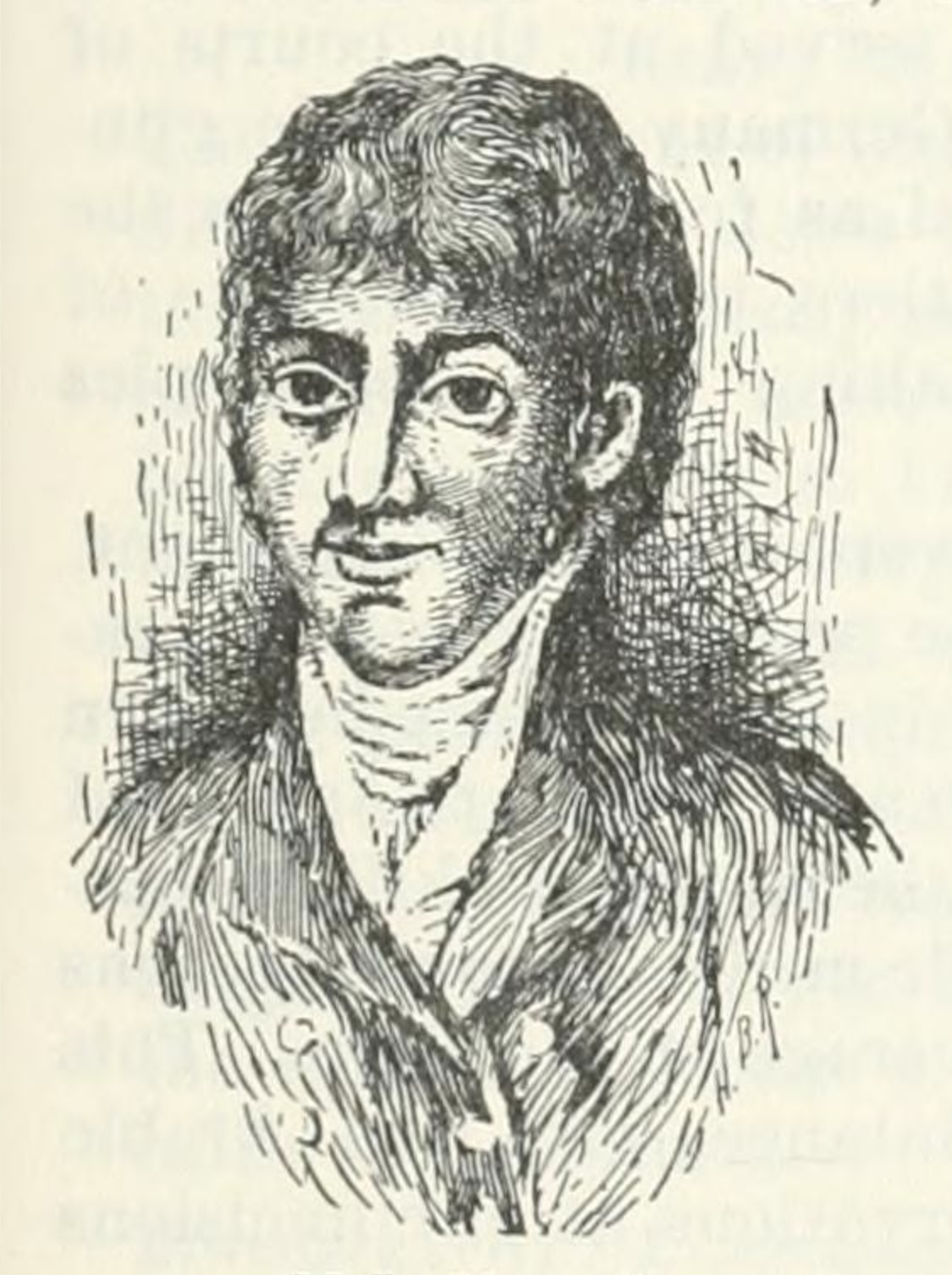
- Born: 1764
- Died: 6 November 1805 (aged 40–41); Vienna, Austrian Empire
- Writing career
- Language: Hebrew

Meir Obernik (Hebrew: מאיר אברניק; 1764 – 6 November 1805) was a writer and Biblical commentator of the Biurist movement.

Obernik contributed to the Me'assef a great number of fables, and was one of the most active of the Biurists. He translated into German the Books of Joshua and Judges, adding a short commentary (bi'ur), and (with Samuel Detmold) the Book of Samuel. The translation of the whole Tanakh, with the bi'ur, was edited by Obernik under the title of Minḥah ḥadashah (Vienna, 1792–1806).
