= Biurists =

The Biurists were a class of Jewish Biblical exegetes, of the school of Moses Mendelssohn. Most of the Biblical commentators immediately preceding Mendelssohn had interpreted the Biblical passages from an individual point of view, and Mendelssohn was concerned to obtain clarity as to the actual meaning of the passages.

== Biurists in Europe ==
German translation and reaction

Mendelssohn compiled for his children a literal German translation of the Pentateuch; and to this Solomon Dubno, a grammarian and Hebraist, undertook to write a bi'ur or commentary.

As soon as a portion of this translation was published, it was criticized by rabbis of the old school, including Raphael Cohen of Hamburg, Ezekiel Landau of Prague, Hirsch Janow of Posen, and Phineas Levi Horwitz of Frankfort-on-the-Main. Fearing that the charm of the German language would lead young Jews to study the translation rather than the Torah itself, and believing that they would thus be led away from orthodox Judaism, the rabbis united forces, and in June, 1779, issued a ban against "the German Pentateuch of Moses of Dessau."

Netibot ha-Shalom

This act led Solomon Dubno to give up his work after having finished Genesis; but, in order that the undertaking might be completed, Mendelssohn himself undertook the commentary. Finding, however, that the work was beyond his strength, he committed to Naphtali Herz Wesel (Hartwig Wessely) the biur to Leviticus, to Aaron Jaroslav that to Numbers, and to Hertz Homberg that to twenty-two of the middle chapters of Deuteronomy.

The work was completed in March, 1783, under the title Netibot ha-Shalom (The Paths of Peace). It is preceded by an introduction in Hebrew, written by Mendelssohn, in which he discusses the history of the work and the rules of idiom and syntax followed in his translation. Mendelssohn wrote, also, a German translation of the Psalms, with a Hebrew introduction ("mebo") on Biblical poetry, for which Joel Löwe (Joel Bril), conjointly with Aaron Wolfsohn (Aaron of Halle, a translator of the Song of Solomon), wrote the biur. The biur to Kaplan Rabe's translation of Ecclesiastes was written by Mendelssohn.

Further biurist translators and commentators

In the nature of the biurist movement was the undertaking of Moses Landau, who in 1806 published a biuristic Bible. Mendelssohn's biuristic school extended from Poland to Alsace, from Italy to Amsterdam, London, and Copenhagen; and it had many imitators, such as:

- Samuel Israel Mulder, who translated into Dutch the Pentateuch, five Megillot, and the former Prophets
- G. A. Parsen, who translated and commented in Hebrew on the Book of Isaiah
- I. Neufeld, who translated the Bible into Polish
- J. L. Mandelstamm, who translated the Bible into Russian.

Isaac Samuel Reggio also followed in the footsteps of the Biurists with an Italian translation and Hebrew commentary to the Pentateuch, and an Italian translation of Isaiah; Samuel David Luzzatto translated the Bible into Italian, and wrote biurim to Job, Isaiah, and the Pentateuch, and some glosses to Jeremiah, Ezekiel, Proverbs, and Job; and M. Rosenthal, J. Mannheimer, and M. Stern translated the Psalms into Hungarian. In Ludwig Philippson's German Commentary, 1827, the commentator groups and examines critically the most important exegetical explanations of the Bible expounders; penetrating into the actual import of the Holy Scripture and searching the spiritual context, so as to explain the Bible by the Bible itself. As regards grammar and lexicography, Philippson touches these only in so far as is necessary to the comprehension of the text.

== Biurists in America ==
The movement later crossed the Atlantic, and Isaac Leeser of Philadelphia translated the Bible into English according to the interpretations of the Biurists; while in Europe steps were taken toward the perpetuation of the movement, in the foundation of the Ḥebra Doreshe Leshon 'Eber (Society of Investigators of the Hebrew Language) by Isaac Abraham Euchel and Mendel Breslau, and in the establishment of the periodical "Ha-Me'assef" (The Gleaner).
