= An die ferne Geliebte =

Song cycle by Ludwig van Beethoven

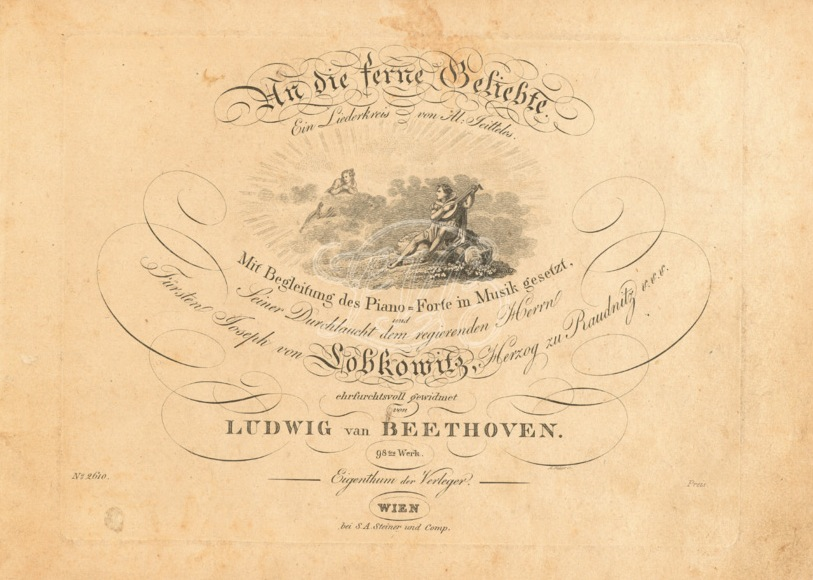
Title page, first edition

An die ferne Geliebte (To the distant beloved), Op. 98, is a composition by Ludwig van Beethoven written in April 1816, setting poetry by Alois Jeitteles.

== Beethoven's Liederkreis ==
Beethoven's only song cycle was the precursor of a series of followers, including those of Franz Schubert, Robert Schumann and Carl Loewe. The setting is for a man's voice (usually tenor) with piano. The title page of the original edition (S. A. Steiner, Vienna) bore a dedication with permission to Fürst Joseph Franz von Lobkowitz, Duke of Raudnitz, a leading Austrian musical patron, in whose palace the Eroica Symphony was first performed in 1804; Beethoven also dedicated the six string quartets, Op. 18, the Eroica Symphony, Op. 55, the Triple Concerto, Op. 56, the C minor Symphony, Op. 67, the Pastoral Symphony, Op. 68, and the String Quartet, Op. 74 to him.

The text was written by a physician named Alois Isidor Jeitteles, probably at Beethoven's request. Jeitteles had published several short verses, economic in style, in Viennese magazines or almanacks, particularly Selam and Aglaja, and was making his name as a poet. He was an active, selfless young man who later distinguished himself by working tirelessly for his patients during a dreadful cholera epidemic and mortality in Brno. Jeitteles's poetic sequence An die ferne Geliebte was written in 1815 when he was 21. Beethoven was acquainted with both Alois and his cousin Ignaz Jeitteles; the composer's early biographer Anton Schindler recorded that Beethoven thanked Jeitteles for the inspiration he provided, but it is not clear whether Jeitteles wrote the poems specifically for Beethoven or whether Beethoven first saw them on publication.

Beethoven had already explored inward feelings of longing in his setting of Matthisson's poem "Adelaide", but in these poems the distance from the beloved is greater, the longing is more intense and stormier, and is no longer satisfied with merely the sound of her name, but is preoccupied with the clawing pain of separation which colours the whole surrounding landscape. Max Friedlaender regarded the entire composition as autobiographical in meaning, and the subject of the composer's longing to be none other than the unsterbliche Geliebte, the Immortal Beloved of his letters of July 1812.

More recently Birgit Lodes has argued that both text and the title page of the first edition refer to a lover far away in "heaven".

The whole sequence is through-composed, so that none of the songs stands alone. The different moods of the six episodes are expressed in different key and time signatures, working from E♭ major in the first song through G major (and briefly C major) in the second to A♭ major and minor in the third and fourth, and thence back through C to E♭. With their underlying thematic linkage, each of the songs is carried without break into the next: a short bridge passage connects 2 and 3, and the last note of 3 is held through the first three bars of the accompaniment to 4 and proceeds into Diese Wolken almost without a breath. The final strophe of 4 has an accelerando leading directly into the vivace of 5.

== Synopsis ==
Unlike the Schubert–Müller song cycles, the six songs or episodes of An die ferne Geliebte do not form a chronological narrative leading towards a conclusion. Beethoven himself called it Liederkreis an die ferne Geliebte, i.e. a circle or ring of song, and it is so written that the theme of the first song reappears as the conclusion of the last, forming a 'circle' (Kreis) – a ring in the figurative sense of a finger-ring as a love-token – rather than a 'cycle' (Zyklus) in the sense of a programme or drama. This thematic revolution is also expressed in the emotion and conceit of the words.

1. He is sitting on a hillside looking at the distant spot where they first met, and, feeling the pain of separation, he decides that he will sing songs to convey the feelings from one loving heart to the other.
2. He identifies himself and his feelings with the landscape and the misty hilltops, sending his suffering into the valley where the soft winds can calm it, and the inward pain of his love into the forest depths: in these he can always be with her, even though he cannot go to her.
3. With this thought he bids the swifts and the brook to greet her, the clouds to form his image for her to see, the little birds to sing to her of his complaint, and the west wind to carry her his sighs like the last rays of the sun, and the brook will carry his tears of love to her.
4. He is enraptured, thinking how the clouds and the birds will see her – let him be borne with them! These breezes will play upon her breast and in her hair – let him share in that delight! And she shall see herself in the brook, and the picture will flow back to him.
5. In lovely May when nature is at the full, and the swallows are building their nests for love to dwell within at their bridal beds, and everything that winter has separated is again united with its mate, it is only their own love which has no springtime, and all they have are tears.
6. So he will send her the songs he has written, and she will sing them to the lute when the red of sunset falls across the blue sea and behind the distant mountain: she will sing what he has sung, artlessly, from the fullness of his heart, out of his longing, and these songs will vanquish what keeps them so far apart, and will join one loving heart to the other.

A performance takes about 15 minutes.

== Text ==
1. Auf dem Hügel sitz ich spähend

Auf dem Hügel sitz ich spähend
In das blaue Nebelland,
Nach den fernen Triften sehend,
Wo ich dich, Geliebte, fand.

Weit bin ich von dir geschieden,
Trennend liegen Berg und Tal
Zwischen uns und unserm Frieden,
Unserm Glück und unsrer Qual.

Ach, den Blick kannst du nicht sehen,
Der zu dir so glühend eilt,
Und die Seufzer, sie verwehen
In dem Raume, der uns theilt

Will denn nichts mehr zu dir dringen,
Nichts der Liebe Bote sein?
Singen will ich, Lieder singen,
Die dir klagen meine Pein!

Denn vor Liebesklang entweichet
Jeder Raum und jede Zeit,
Und ein liebend Herz erreichet
Was ein liebend Herz geweiht!

2. Wo die Berge so blau

Wo die Berge so blau
Aus dem nebligen Grau
Schauen herein,
Wo die Sonne verglüht,
Wo die Wolke umzieht,
Möchte ich sein!

Dort im ruhigen Tal
Schweigen Schmerzen und Qual
Wo im Gestein
Still die Primel dort sinnt,
Weht so leise der Wind,
Möchte ich sein!

Hin zum sinnigen Wald
Drängt mich Liebesgewalt,
Innere Pein
Ach, mich zög's nicht von hier,
Könnt ich, Traute, bei dir
Ewiglich sein!

3. Leichte Segler in den Höhen

Leichte Segler in den Höhen,
Und du, Bächlein klein und schmal,
Könnt mein Liebchen ihr erspähen,
Grüßt sie mir viel tausendmal.

Seht ihr, Wolken, sie dann gehen
Sinnend in dem stillen Tal,
Laßt mein Bild vor ihr entstehen
In dem luft'gen Himmelssaal.

Wird sie an den Büschen stehen
Die nun herbstlich falb und kahl.
Klagt ihr, wie mir ist geschehen,
Klagt ihr, Vöglein, meine Qual.

Stille Weste, bringt im Wehen
Hin zu meiner Herzenswahl
Meine Seufzer, die vergehen
Wie der Sonne letzter Strahl.

Flüstr' ihr zu mein Liebesflehen,
Laß sie, Bächlein klein und schmal,
Treu in deinen Wogen sehen
Meine Tränen ohne Zahl!

4. Diese Wolken in den Höhen

Diese Wolken in den Höhen,
Dieser Vöglein muntrer Zug,
Werden dich, o Huldin, sehen.
Nehmt mich mit im leichten Flug!

Diese Weste werden spielen
Scherzend dir um Wang' und Brust,
In den seidnen Locken wühlen.
Teilt ich mit euch diese Lust!

Hin zu dir von jenen Hügeln
Emsig dieses Bächlein eilt.
Wird ihr Bild sich in dir spiegeln,
Fließ zurück dann unverweilt!

5. Es kehret der Maien, es blühet die Au

Es kehret der Maien, es blühet die Au,
Die Lüfte, sie wehen so milde, so lau,
Geschwätzig die Bäche nun rinnen.

Die Schwalbe, die kehret zum wirtlichen Dach,
Sie baut sich so emsig ihr bräutlich Gemach,
Die Liebe soll wohnen da drinnen.

Sie bringt sich geschäftig von kreuz und von quer
Manch weicheres Stück zu dem Brautbett hierher,
Manch wärmendes Stück für die Kleinen

Nun wohnen die Gatten beisammen so treu,
Was Winter geschieden, verband nun der Mai,
Was liebet, das weiß er zu einen.

Es kehret der Maien, es blühet die Au.
Die Lüfte, sie wehen so milde, so lau.
Nur ich kann nicht ziehen von hinnen.

Wenn alles, was liebet, der Frühling vereint,
Nur unserer Liebe kein Frühling erscheint,
Und Tränen sind all ihr Gewinnen.

6. Nimm sie hin denn, diese Lieder

Nimm sie hin denn, diese Lieder,
Die ich dir, Geliebte, sang,
Singe sie dann abends wieder
Zu der Laute süßem Klang.

Wenn das Dämmrungsrot dann zieht
Nach dem stillen blauen See,
Und sein letzter Strahl verglühet
Hinter jener Bergeshöh;

Und du singst, was ich gesungen,
Was mir aus der vollen Brust
Ohne Kunstgepräng erklungen,
Nur der Sehnsucht sich bewußt:

Dann vor diesen Liedern weichet
Was geschieden uns so weit,
Und ein liebend Herz erreichet
Was ein liebend Herz geweiht.
