= Karl Bernhard Wessely =

German composer (1768–1826)

Karl Bernhard Wessely, also Carl Bernhard Wessely (Berlin 1 September 1768 – Potsdam 11 July 1826), was a German composer. He was born to a Jewish family in Berlin associated with intellectual circles, both Jewish and Christian: his father was Naphtali Hirz Wessely. Wessely was conductor and Hofkapellmeister of Prince Henry of Prussia in Rheinsberg. He composed, among other pieces, a cantata mourning of the death of Moses Mendelssohn, (Sulamith und Eusebia , 1786).

== Life ==
Born in Berlin, Wessely was a student of J. A. Schulz. He became music director at the Royal National Theater in Berlin in 1788, and became court music director in Rheinsberg in 1796. After the prince's death in 1802 he largely gave up his musical career and became a low-ranking civil servant in Berlin and later in Potsdam, where he founded a club for classical music, which he headed until his death. He was a member of the Berlin Freemason's Lodge "Friedrich Wilhelm zur gekrönten Gerechtigkeit".

Wessely composed several operas, ballet and incidental music for the theatre, Lieder, funeral cantatas and string quartets. He was also active as a musicological writer and supplied journal articles, especially for the Archiv der Zeit and the Allgemeine musikalische Zeitung.

Wessely died in Potsdam at the age of 57.
