= Battle of Breslau =

Battle of Breslau may refer to:

- Battle of Breslau (1757), part of the Third Silesian War, part of the Seven Years' War
- Siege of Breslau (1757), part of the Third Silesian War, part of the Seven Years' War
- Siege of Breslau (1760), part of the Third Silesian War, part of the Seven Years' War
- Siege of Breslau (1945), part of World War II
- Germany v Denmark (1937), a football match with the Breslau Eleven
