= Naphtali Hirz Wessely =

German scholar (1725–1805)

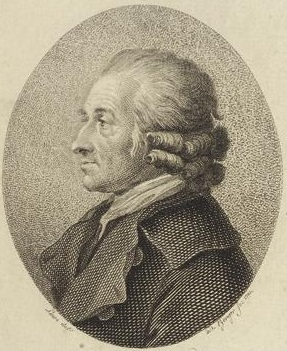
- Born: 9 December 1725; Hamburg, Holy Roman Empire
- Died: 28 February 1805 (aged 79); Hamburg, Holy Roman Empire
- Writing career
- Literary movement: Haskalah

Naphtali Hirz (Hartwig) Wessely (Note: Also known as Wesel, Weisel, and by the acronyms Nahav (נה״ו), Ranhav (רנה״ו), and Ranav (רנ״ו).) (Yiddish: נפתלי הירץ וויזעל, romanized: Naftali Hirtz Vizel; 9 December 1725 – 28 February 1805) was a German-Jewish Hebraist and educationist.

== Family history ==
One of Wessely's ancestors, Joseph Reis, fled from Podolia in 1648 on account of the Chmielnicki persecutions, during which his whole family had perished. After a brief sojourn in Kraków, Reis settled in Amsterdam, where he acquired great wealth, and where he, in 1671, was one of the signers of a petition to the Dutch government requesting permission to erect a synagogue. Together with his younger son Moses (Naphtali Hirz's father), Reis later settled in Wesel on the Rhine, whence the family name "Wessely" originated. In the synagogue at Wesel (destroyed during Kristallnacht) preserved some ritual paraphernalia presented to it by Moses Reis Wessely, who, upon the advice of the Prince of Holstein, whose purveyor he was, removed to Glückstadt, then the capital of Sleswick. He established there a factory of arms. King Frederick VI of Denmark later sent Moses to Hamburg as his agent, and while there he transacted important business for Peter the Great as well. Moses' son, Issachar Ber Wessely, was the father of Naphtali Hirz.

== Biography ==
Naphtali Herz Wessely passed his childhood at Copenhagen, where his father was purveyor to the king. In addition to rabbinical studies under Jonathan Eybeschütz, he studied modern languages. As the representative of the banker Feitel, he later visited Amsterdam, where he published (1765–66) his Lebanon, or Gan Na'ul, a philological investigation of Hebrew roots and synonyms. Although prolix in style, and lacking scientific method, this work established his reputation. After his marriage at Copenhagen, he represented Feitel at Berlin, and there became associated with Moses Mendelssohn. Wessely encouraged the latter in his labors by publishing Alim li-Terufah, a work advocating the bi'ur and the translation of the Bible into German. To this work Wessely himself contributed a commentary on Leviticus (Berlin, 1782), having published, two years previously, a Hebrew edition of the Book of Wisdom, together with a commentary. He died in Hamburg on 28 February 1805.

His son was the composer Karl Bernhard Wessely.

== Works ==
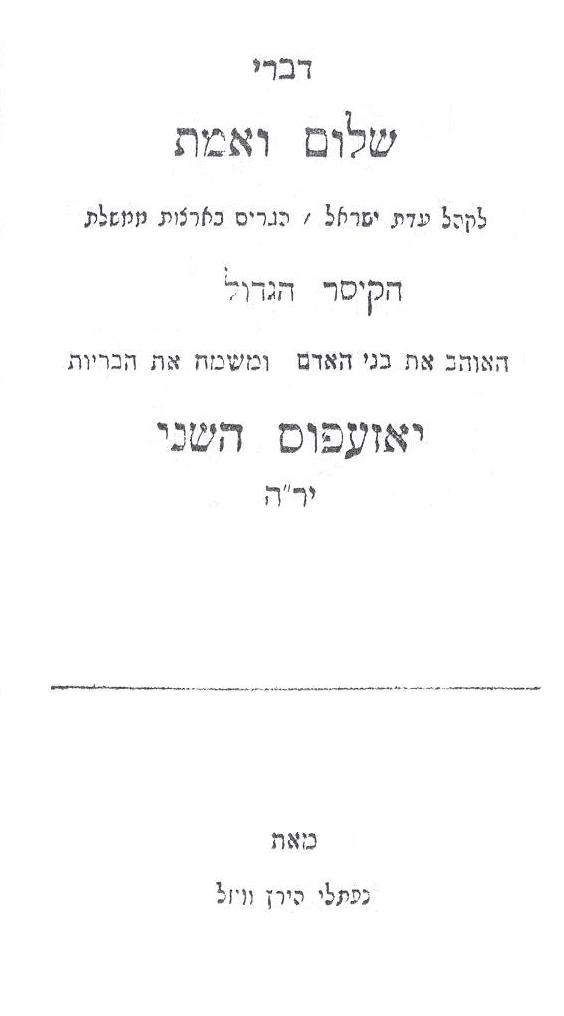
Title page of Wessely's Divrei Shalom ve-Emet (Berlin, 1782)

Wessely was an advocate of the educational and social reforms outlined in Emperor Joseph II's Toleranzedict. He even risked his reputation for piety by publishing a manifesto in eight chapters, entitled Divrei Shalom ve-Emet ('Words of Peace and Truth'), in which he emphasized the necessity for secular instruction, as well as for other reforms, even from the points of view of the Mosaic law and the Talmud. This work was translated into French as Instructions Salutaires Addressées aux Communautés Juives de l'Empire de Joseph II. (Paris, 1792), into Italian by Elia Morpurgo (Goerz, 1793), and into German by David Friedländer under the title Worte der Wahrheit und des Friedens (Berlin, 1798). By thus espousing the cause of reform, as well as by his support of Mendelssohn, Wessely incurred the displeasure of the rabbinical authorities of Germany and Poland, who threatened him with excommunication.

His rivals, however, were finally pacified through the energetic intervention of the Italian rabbis, as well as by Wessely's pamphlets Meḳor Ḥen, in which he gave evidence of his sincere piety. In 1788 Wessely published in Berlin his ethical treatise Sefer ha-Middot ('The Book of Virtues'), a work of Musar literature. He also published several odes, elegies, and other poems. His magnum opus is his five-volume work Shire Tif'eret (I–IV, Berlin, 1782–1802; V, Prague, 1829), describing in rhetorical style the exodus from Egypt. This work, through which he earned the admiration of his contemporaries, was translated into German (by G. F. Hufnagel and Henry Spalding; 1789–1805), and partly into French (by Michel Berr; Paris, 1815). His commentaries on the Bible were published by the society Mekitze Nirdamim (Lyck, 1868–75) under the title Imre Shefer.

Wessely influenced his contemporaries in various directions. As a scholar he contributed, by his profound philological researches, to the reconstruction of the language of the Bible, though his work is marred by prolixity and by his refusal to admit shades of meaning in synonyms. As a poet he possessed perfection of style, but lacked feeling and artistic imagination. No one exerted a greater influence than he on the dissemination of modern Hebrew, and no one, on the other hand, did more to retard the development of pure art and of poetic intuition. Because of his energetic commitment to the cause of Jewish emancipation, Wessely may be regarded as a leader of the Maskilim.

Wessely also wrote a commentary on Pirkei Avot entitled Yein Levanon, which was highly regarded in Musar Yeshivas.

== Commemoration ==
Weisel Street in Tel Aviv is named after Naftali Hertz Weisel (Wessely)
