= Vysoká (Mělník District) =

- Municipality
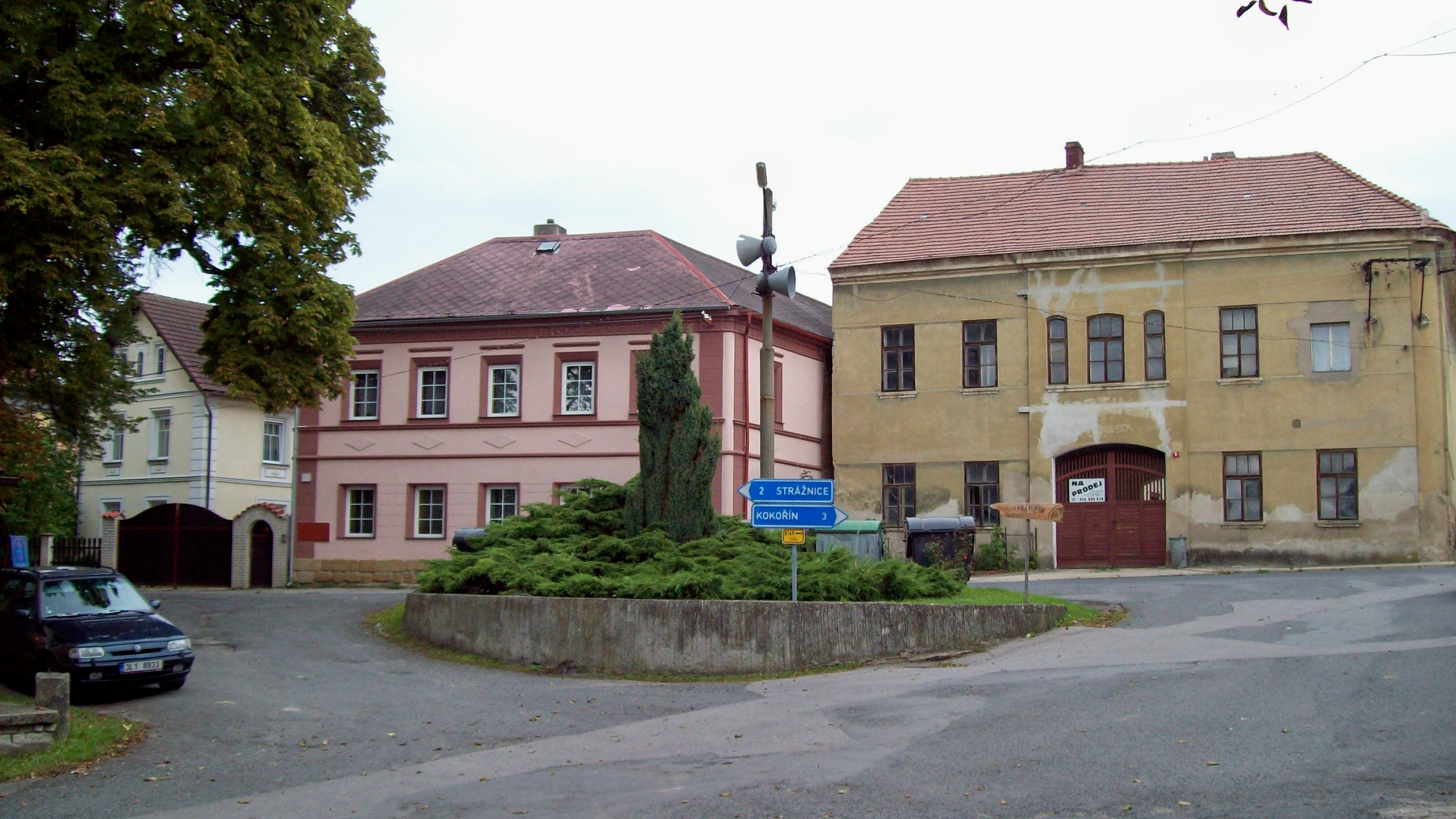
- Centre of Vysoká

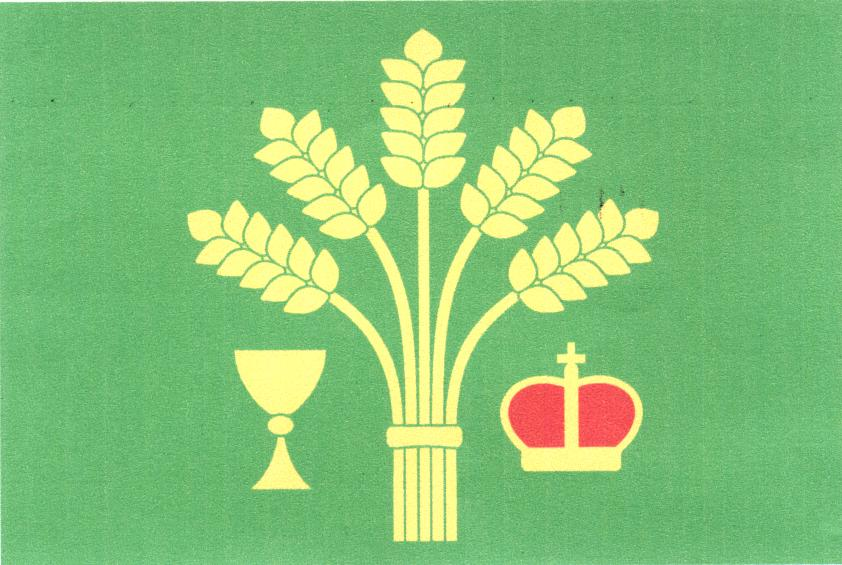
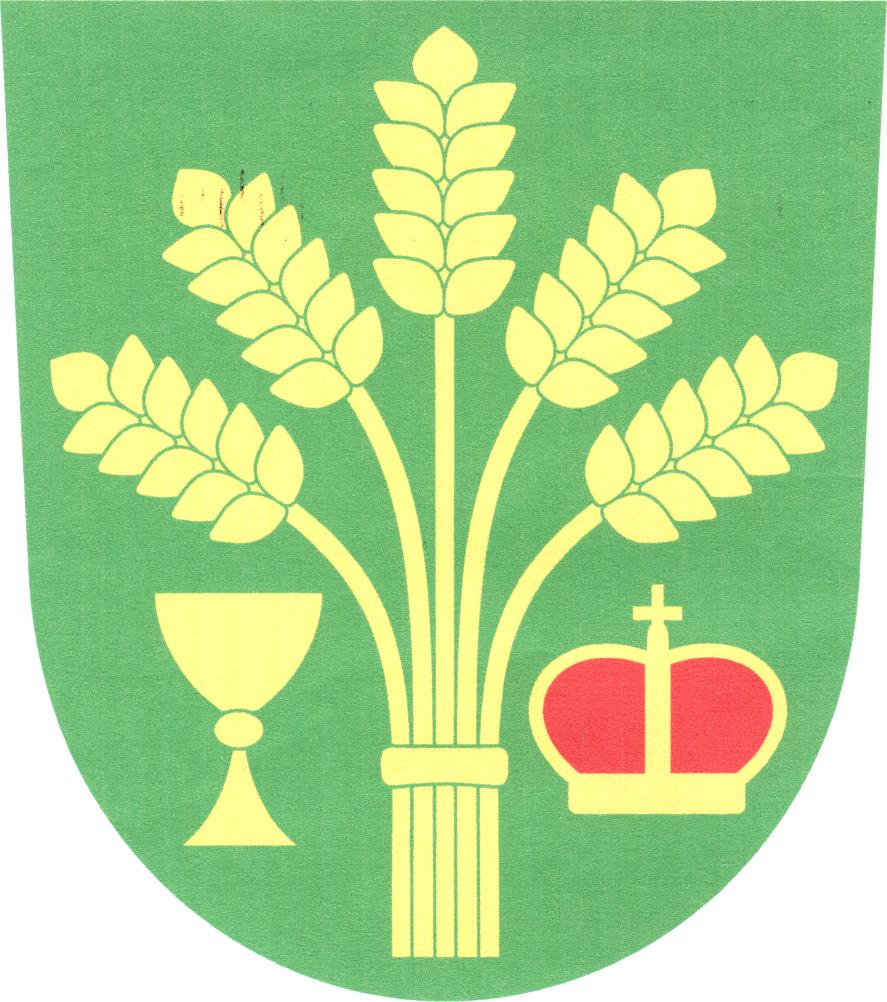
- Flag Coat of arms

- Location in the Czech Republic
- Coordinates: 50°24′45″N 14°32′18″E
- Country: Czech Republic
- Region: Central Bohemian
- District: Mělník
- First mentioned: 1227

Area
  - Total: 28.42 km^{2} (10.97 sq mi)
- Elevation: 315 m (1,033 ft)

Population (2026-01-01)
  - Total: 937
  - Density: 33.0/km^{2} (85.4/sq mi)
- Time zone: UTC+1 (CET)
  - Summer (DST): UTC+2 (CEST)
- Postal code: 277 24
- Website: www.obecvysoka.cz

Vysoká is a municipality and village in Mělník District in the Central Bohemian Region of the Czech Republic. It has about 900 inhabitants.

== Administrative division ==
Vysoká consists of five municipal parts (in brackets population according to the 2021 census):

- Vysoká (269)
- Bosyně (141)
- Chodeč (64)
- Strážnice (136)
- Střednice (286)

== Demographics ==
Historical population
Year	Pop.	±%
1869	1,610	—
1880	1,705	+5.9%
1890	1,839	+7.9%
1900	1,783	−3.0%
1910	1,639	−8.1%
1921	1,700	+3.7%
1930	1,667	−1.9%
1950	1,128	−32.3%
1961	1,105	−2.0%
1970	950	−14.0%
1980	911	−4.1%
1991	766	−15.9%
2001	736	−3.9%
2011	806	+9.5%
2021	896	+11.2%
Source: Censuses
