= Solomon Dubno =

Volhynian poet and grammarian

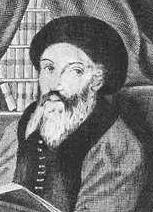
Solomon Dubno

Solomon ben Joel Dubno (Hebrew: שלמה בן יואל דובנה; October 1738 – June 26, 1813) was a Polish-Jewish poet, grammarian, Biblical commentator, and Maskil.

== Biography ==
He was born at Dubno, Volhynia, then Kingdom of Poland. When he was 14 years old his parents married him to the daughter of the Talmudist Simhah ben Joshua of Volozhin. Having exhausted the knowledge of his Volhynian instructors, Dubno went to Galicia, studying there for several years Biblical exegesis and grammar under the direction of Rabbi Solomon of Cholm. Dubno soon became proficient in these branches of Jewish science, and was charged by his master with the revision and publication of his work on the Hebrew accents, Sha'are Ne'imah (Frankfort-on-the-Main, 1766).

From 1767 to 1772 Dubno lived at Amsterdam, attracted by its rich collections of Hebrew books. On leaving Amsterdam he settled in Berlin, earning a livelihood by teaching. Among his pupils was the son of Moses Mendelssohn, who, highly appreciating Dubno's scholarship, became his patron and friend. Dubno wrote a commentary for Mendelssohn's translation of the book of Genesis. This was published in the first volume of Mendelssohn translation of the Pentateuch.

In 1782–3, he spent about six months in Wilno, living with the wealthy Jewish financier Joseph Pesseles. (He alludes to this in his work Birkath Yosef, published at Dyhernfurth, 1783.) After the death of Mendelssohn, Dubno stopped for a short time in Frankfort-on-the-Main, and then returned to Amsterdam. There, at first fêted, and later ignored, deriving a scanty income from the loan of the books from his rich library, he remained until his death on June 26, 1813.

== Other works ==
In addition to the works mentioned above, Dubno wrote the following:

- Poems, appearing (p. 34) among those of Immanuel, published by Löb Wolf at Berlin, 1776; in the Bikkure To'elet (pp. 4, 114), published by the Anshe To'elet Society of Amsterdam; and in Heidenheim's Sefer Ḳerobot.
- Ebel Yaḥid, an elegy on the death of Jacob Emden, published at Berlin, 1776.
- A preface to Moses Ḥayyim Luzzatto's poem La-Yesharim Tehillah, ib. 1780.
- A work on the geography of Palestine, promised by him in his commentary on Genesis, where he displayed a profound knowledge of the subject. Luncz (Jerusalem, 1892, pp. 137 et seq.) identifies this work with the Ahabat Ẓiyyon of Dubno's father-in-law, Simḥah ben Joshua, but as this is a mere plagiarism from the Karaite Samuel ben David's story of his voyage to Palestine, published in Gurland's Ginze Yisrael, it is probable that Lehren (Catalogue, p. 247) is right in doubting the identification.
- Reshimah (Register), catalogue of his library, published at Amsterdam, 1814. It contains 2,076 printed works and 106 manuscripts.
- Dubno left a great number of essays, poems, etc., which are still extant in manuscript.
