= Libeň =

Cadastral area of Prague, Czechia

- Cadastral Area of Prague
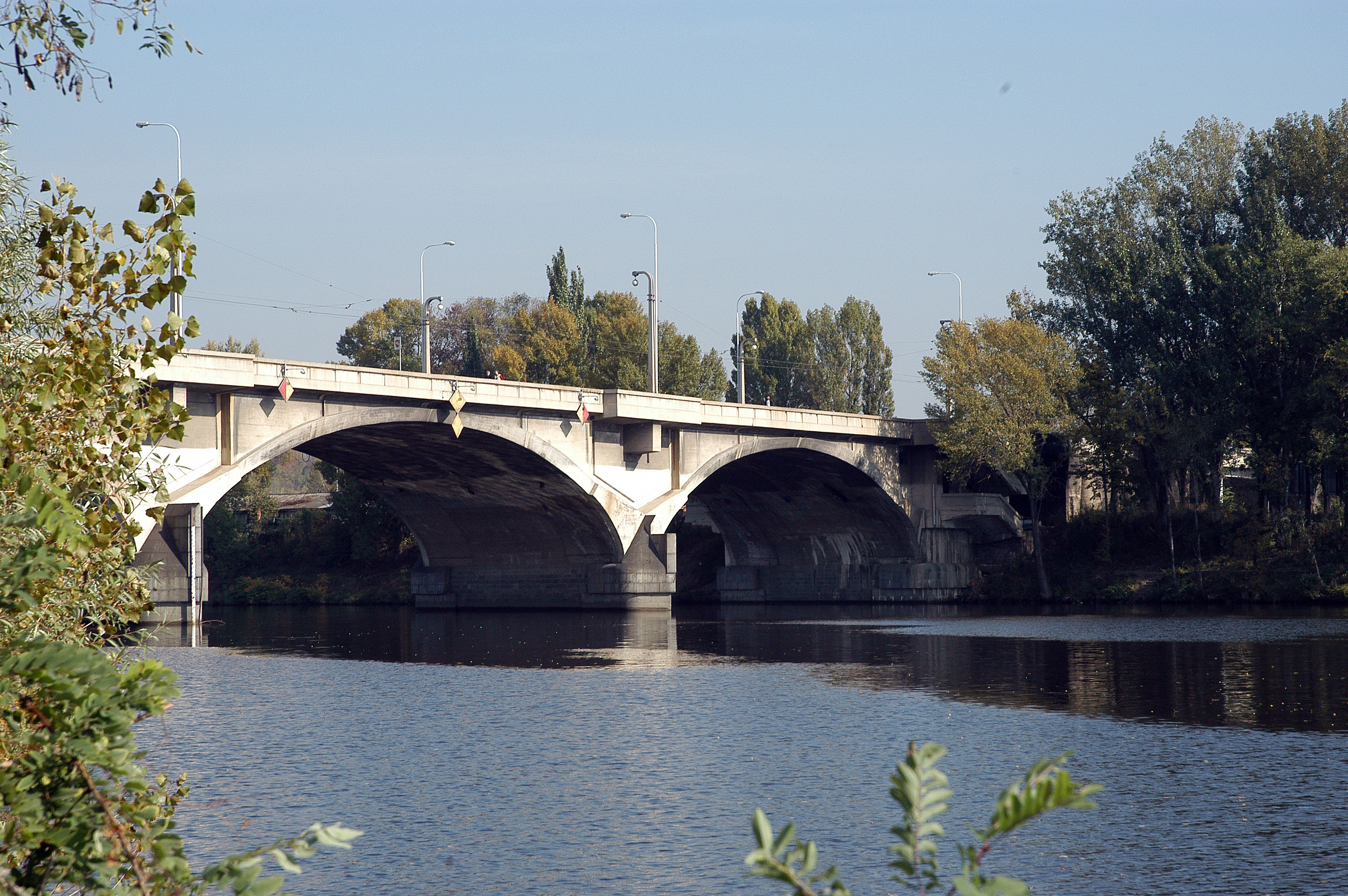
- Libeň bridge connecting Libeň with Holešovice

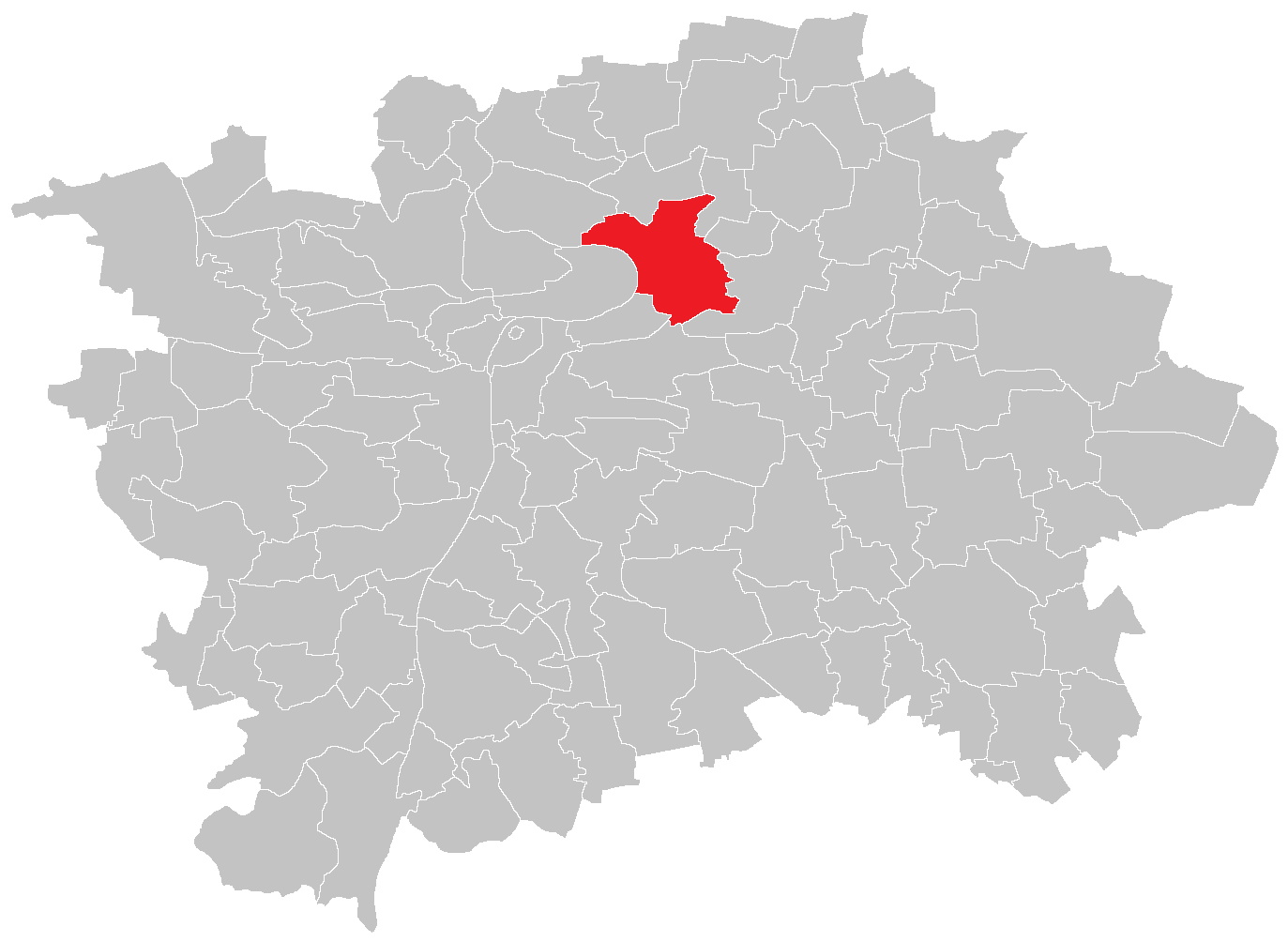
- Location of Libeň in Prague
- Coordinates: 50°06′42″N 14°28′13″E
- Country: Czech Republic
- Region: Prague
- District: Prague 7, Prague 8, Prague 9

Area
  - Total: 7.38 km^{2} (2.85 sq mi)

Population (2021)
  - Total: 36,151
  - Density: 4,900/km^{2} (12,700/sq mi)
- Time zone: UTC+1 (CET)
  - Summer (DST): UTC+2 (CEST)
- Postal code: 180 00, 190 00

Libeň (German: Lieben) is a cadastral area and district of Prague, Czech Republic. It was incorporated into Prague in 1901.

== Places ==
- Praha-Libeň railway station

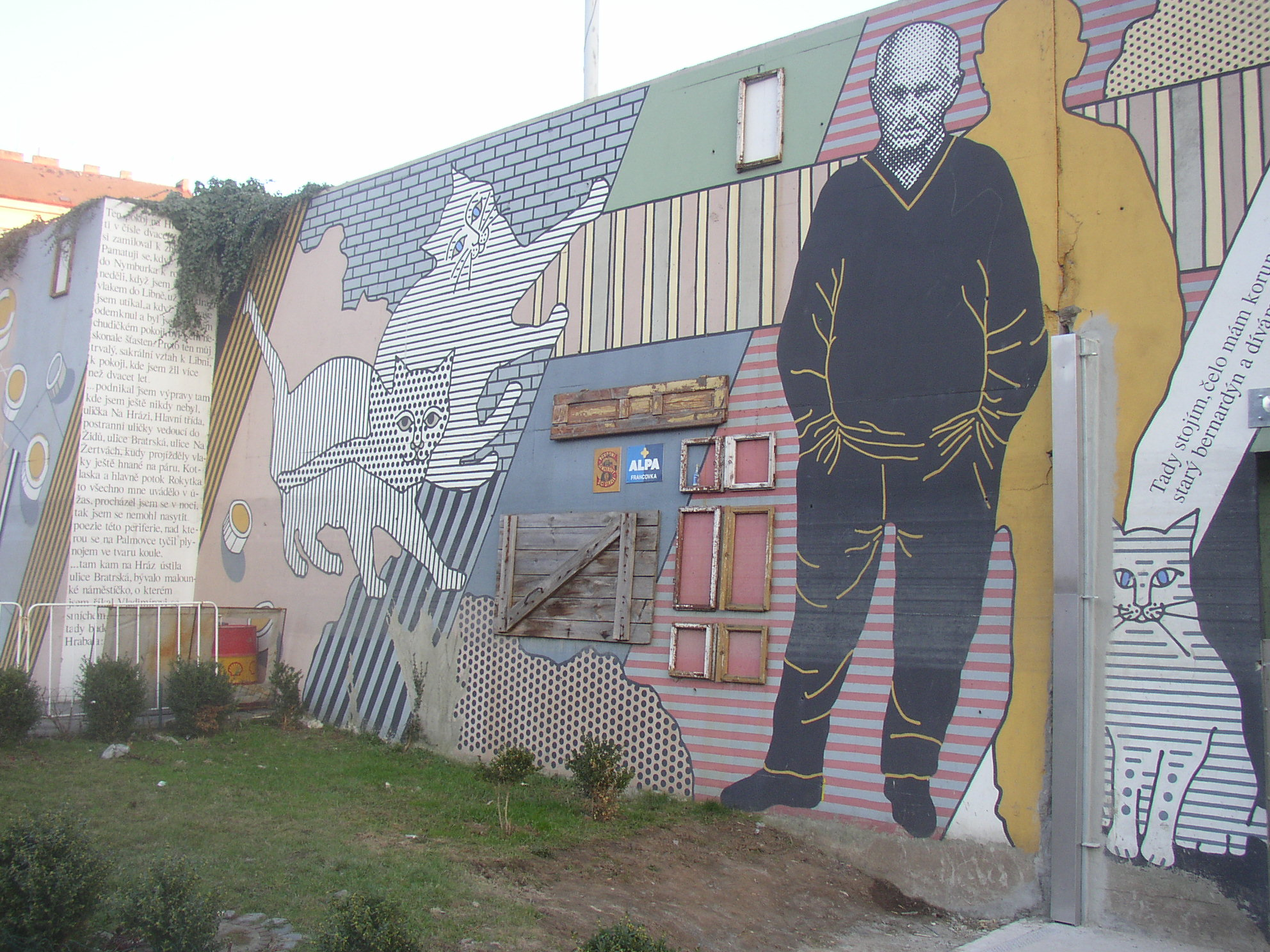
Bohumil Hrabal painted among his beloved cats on the "Hrabal Wall" in Prague

== Demographics ==
Historical population

Year	Pop.	±%
1869	5,845	—
1880	9,669	+65.4%
1890	12,536	+29.7%
1900	21,242	+69.4%
1910	27,192	+28.0%
1921	29,679	+9.1%
1930	40,755	+37.3%
1950	48,283	+18.5%

Year	Pop.	±%
1961	48,351	+0.1%
1970	42,181	−12.8%
1980	34,024	−19.3%
1991	29,476	−13.4%
2001	27,506	−6.7%
2011	32,749	+19.1%
2021	36,151	+10.4%

Source: Censuses

== People ==
- Reinhard Heydrich, assassinated here
- Herz Homberg, born here
- Ernestine Schumann-Heink, born here
- Bohumil Hrabal, lived here
- Karel Hlaváček, was born and lived here
- Karel Janoušek, was buried here
