= Isaac Abraham Euchel =

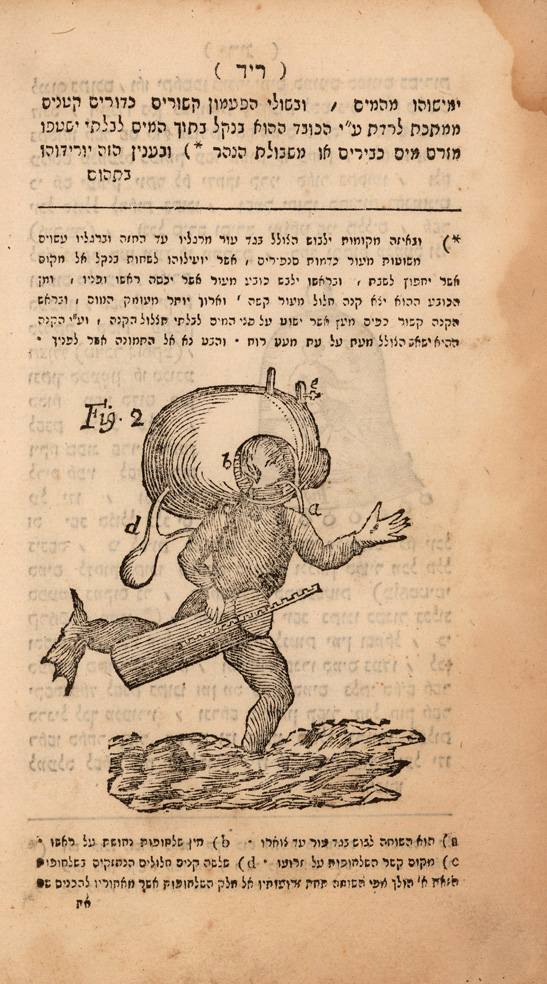
ha-Measef le-shenat ... /... `al yede anashe heverat dorashe ever be-Kenigsberg. Koenigsberg, Breslau, & Berlin, 1783-1797. a diver using air trapped in animal skin

Isaac Abraham Euchel (Hebrew: יצחק אייכל; born at Copenhagen, October 17, 1756; died at Berlin, June 14, 1804) was a Hebrew author and founder of the "Haskalah-movement".

He was born in Copenhagen on October 17, 1756. After his bar mitzvah he was sent, as a young prodigy, to Berlin, where he studied the Talmud with his uncle, Rabbi Masos Rintel, from 1769 to 1773. Then he went to Frankfurt-on-Main, where he worked as a private teacher ("Hofmeister") for a rich Jewish family. In 1776 he went to Hannover where he studied the "chochmot", the worldly sciences, with the then over ninety-year-old Raphael Levi Hannover (1685–1779), who had been a student and assistant of Gottfried Leibniz in his youth and had published general mathematical and Jewish religious writings. In 1778 Euchel changed to Königsberg, where he studied Oriental languages, education and philosophy at the University of Königsberg – the latter under Immanuel Kant. Whether, as some say, he acquired a fine Hebrew style from Moses Mendelssohn and Naphtali Wessely, or was self-taught – he became one of the foremost hebraists of his time. Kant thought of appointing him in May 1787 as professor of Oriental languages at the University, where he was dean of the faculty of philosophy, but after some weeks came to the conclusion that Euchel was unfit after all, as "it is hardly possible for a Jewish teacher of the Hebrew language to abstain from the rabbinic expositions to which he has been accustomed from his youth."

In early 1782 Euchel founded, with other young scholars, in Königsberg, the "Chevrat Dorshei Leshon Ever", the "Society of the Friends of Hebrew Literature", and became one of the editors of the periodical "Ha-Meassef" (1783), the organ of the Biurists, where he published regularly. Of special importance, both to the Jews of his time and as source-material for present-day scholars, was his biography of Moses Mendelssohn, which appeared first in installments in 1788. He did not only do valuable factual research but used it to introduce Mendelssohn's philosophy and ideas (published mainly in German) to the Hebrew-reading public. For some time Euchel was bookkeeper in the establishment of Meyer Warburg in Berlin. In 1792 he founded, with other young scholars, like Joseph Mendelssohn, E. Wolfssohn, and N. Oppenheimer, the "Gesellschaft der Freunde" in Berlin, a society of mainly young Jews who wanted to think outside the bounds of strict orthodoxy.

Euchel's chief works are: "Gebete der Deutsch-Polnischen, Juden" (translated from the Hebrew, with notes, Ratisbon, 1786–88; Vienna, 1790–98); "Die Sprüche Salomos" (translated from Hebrew, with Hebrew commentary, Berlin, 1789–98; Offenbach, 1805–08); "Ist nach Jüdischen Gesetzen das Uebernachten der Todten Wirklich Verboten?" (Breslau, 1797–98); "Mose Maimuni's 'More Nebuchim,' mit einem Kommentar von Mose Narboni und einem Kommentar von S. Maimon" (Berlin, 1791; Sulzbach, 1829). The most brilliant example of Euchel's Hebrew style is found in his biography of Moses Mendelssohn, entitled "Toledot Rambeman: Lebensgeschichte Mos. Mendelssohns, mit Excerpten aus seinem 'Jerusalem'" (In bookform: Berlin, 1789; Vienna, 1804).
