= Herz Homberg =

Bohemian educator (1749–1841)

Naftali Herz Homberg
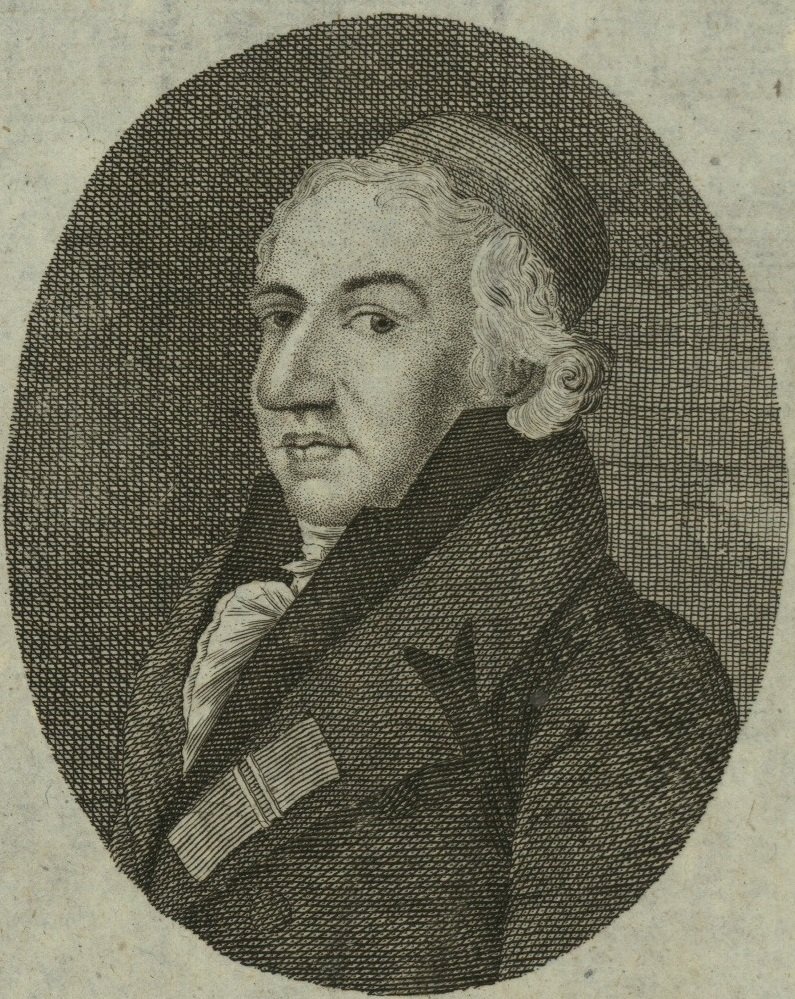
- Born: Naphtali Herz Homberg; September 1749; Lieben, Bohemia, Habsburg Empire
- Died: 24 August 1841 (aged 91); Prague, Bohemia, Austrian Empire
- Writing career
- Notable work: Imre Shefer (1802)

Naphtali Herz Homberg (Yiddish: נפתלי הערץ האָמבערג; September 1749 – 24 August 1841) was a Bohemian maskil, educator, and writer.

== Biography ==
Heerz Homberg was born at Lieben in 1749. He studied Talmud at Prague, Pressburg, and Glogau, and began the study of general literature in his seventeenth year. The reading of Rousseau's Emile awakened in him the desire to devote himself to pedagogy. He prepared himself at Berlin, where he became tutor (1779) to Moses Mendelssohn's eldest son, Joseph. During the three years he remained under Mendelssohn's roof he himself became a pupil of the philosopher, who continued to take an interest in him, as may be seen by his fifteen letters to Homberg (Mendelssohn's Gesammelte Schriften, v., Leipzig, 1844).

Under Emperor Joseph II the status of the Jews in Austria underwent a complete change. German normal schools were to be introduced into the Jewish communities, but there were no men available to organize these schools and take charge of the public instruction. Homberg now decided to return to his native country. Being very highly recommended by Mendelssohn, he was appointed (1784) superintendent of all the German-Jewish schools of Galicia.

In 1793 he was called by Emperor Francis II to Vienna to formulate laws regulating the moral and political status of the Jews in Austria. The work appeared in 1797, and won for Homberg the great gold medal. When the normal schools of Galicia were placed under the general direction of the district schools, Homberg retired to Vienna, employing his time partly as censor and partly in compiling such readers for Jews as had been ordered by the royal commission for studies. He was not successful in either of these directions.

Homberg was later appointed assistant professor of religious and moral philosophy at Prague, with the title of "Schulrath," retaining this position until his death.

== Bibliography ==
- Bi'ur. Berlin. 1783. Hebrew commentary to Deuteronomy.
- Vertheidigung der Jüdischen Nation Gegen die in den Provinzblättern Enthaltenen Angriffe. Görz. 1785.
- "Sendschreiben über das Unterrichtswesen in Galizien". Der Sammler: 227.
- Sendschreiben an die Rabbiner und Jüdischen Gemeindevorsteher in Galizien (in Hebrew and German). Lemberg. 1788.
- "Über die Moralische und Politische Verbesserung der Israeliten in Böhmen". Hufnagel's Journal. Frankfort-on-the-Main. 1796.
- Imre Shefer (in Hebrew and German). Vienna: Gedruckt bey Georg Hroshantski. 1802. hdl:2027/nnc1.0023463767. A religious and moral reader for young people.
- Zwölf Fragen, vom Minister des Innern in Frankreich der Israelitischen Deputation in Paris Vorgelegt und von Ihr Beantwortet. Vienna: Gedruckt bey Mathias Andreas Schmidt. 1806. hdl:2027/hvd.hn3cub. From the French, with notes.
- Bne Zion. Bene-Tsiyon. Augsburg: Verlagsgewölbe des k. k. Schulbücher-Verschleisses. 1812. hdl:2027/hvd.hw5hqa. Religious-moral reader for children.
- Ben Yaḳḳir, Über Glaubenswahrheiten und Sittenlehren für die Israelitische Jugend. Prague. 1814.
- Ha-Korem. Prague. 1817. A commentary on the Pentateuch and on Job and Jeremiah.
- Rede bei Eröffnung der Religiös-Moralischen Vorlesungen für Israeliten in Prag. 1818.
