= David Friedländer =

German banker, writer and communal leader (1750–1834)

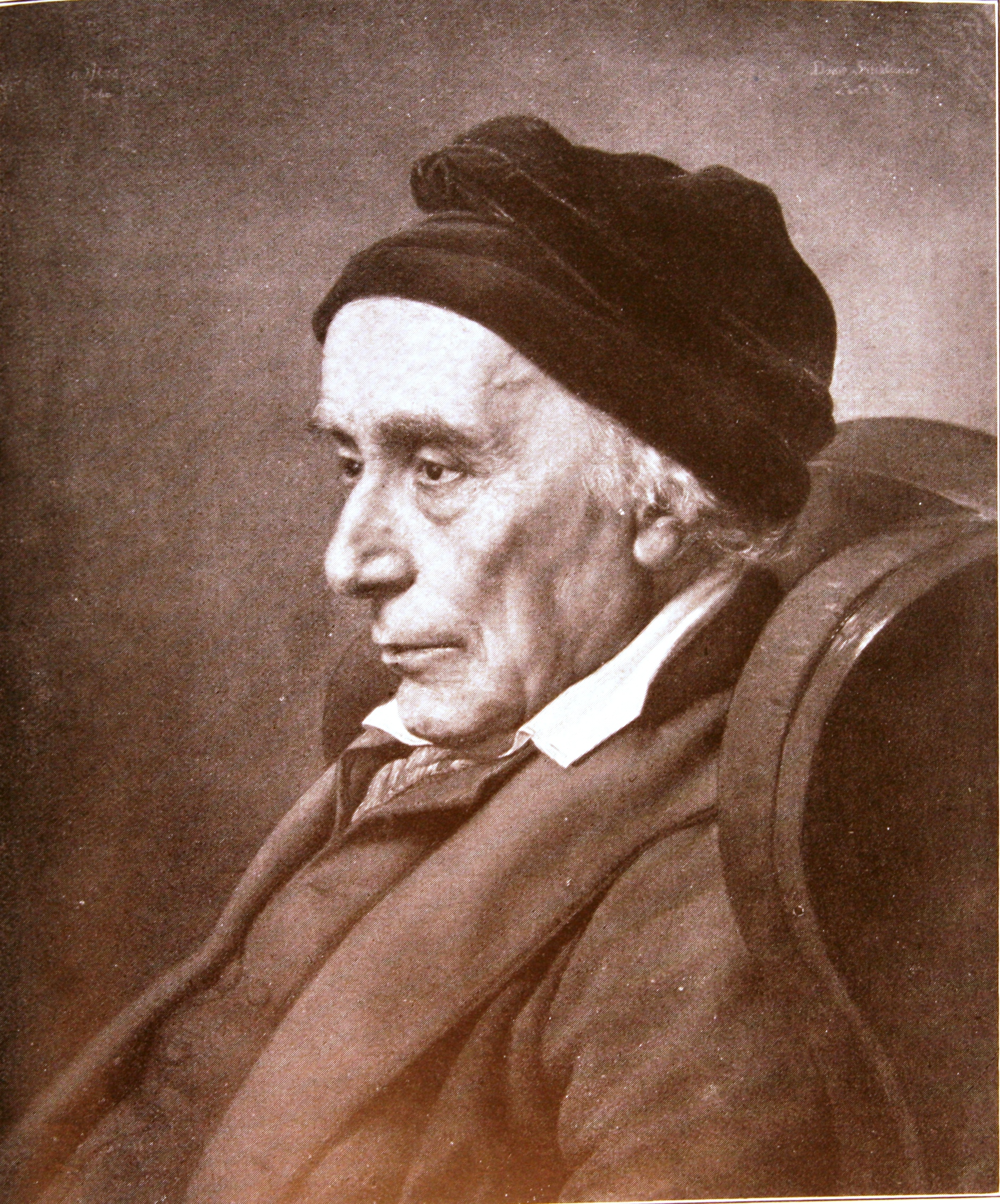
David Friedländer

David Friedländer (sometimes spelled Friedlander; 6 December 1750, Königsberg – 25 December 1834, Berlin) was a German banker, writer and communal leader.

== Life ==
Communal leader and author in Berlin, a pioneer of the practice and ideology of assimilation, and a forerunner of Reform Judaism. Born in Koenigsberg, the son of a "protected Jew," Joachim Moses Friedlaender, a wholesale merchant, David settled in Berlin in 1770, and in 1776 established a silk factory there. As an expert in his field, he was appointed counselor of the state Commission of Inquiry into the textile industry. In 1791 he forwarded a memorandum in the name of the manufacturers, advocating changes in the economic system against excessive government supervision over industry and the granting of protective tariffs to individual manufacturers. However, his interests ranged far beyond his business activities. Entering Moses Mendelssohn's circle at the age of 21, Friedlaender absorbed Mendelssohn's ideas and became prominent among his followers. Through his marriage in 1772 with Blümchen Itzig, daughter of the banker Daniel Itzig, he entered one of the wealthiest and most distinguished families of Court Jews in Prussia.

In 1799 Friedlaender sent his famous Sendschreiben ("Open Letter") to Pastor Teller in which he expressed, "in the name of some Jewish householders," a deistic conception of religion. For this reason, he rejected Christian dogma as well as the retention of Jewish ritual precepts. According to him the eternal truths around which enlightened Jews and Protestants should unite were synonymous with the pure teachings of Moses, i.e., with original Jewish monotheism. Throughout his life Friedlaender regarded Mosaic monotheism as an ideal to be followed; it was apparently the positive factor in his decision (in which he differed from many of his circle) against conversion to Christianity. "We are destined from time immemorial to guard and teach by example the pure doctrine of the unity and sanctity of God, previously unknown to any other people," Friedlaender wrote in 1815 in his Reden der Erbauung ("Edifying Speeches"). In his respect for biblical Judaism, he was a faithful disciple of Mendelssohn, although Kant, who exercised an influence on Friedlaender, disparaged biblical Judaism. Friedlaender shared the educational ideals and belief in liturgical reform current among representatives of the Jewish enlightenment in Berlin after Mendelssohn, giving expression to these ideas in his writings.

After the issue of the 1812 edict in Prussia, he published a paper on the reforms which he deemed necessary as a result of the new organization of the Jews in Prussia (reform of the divine service in the synagogues, of teaching institutions and subjects taught, and of their manner of education in general). Above all, he proposed substituting the prayer in place of the expression of messianic hopes: "I stand here before God. I pray for blessing and prosperity for my compatriots, for myself and my family, not for the return to Jerusalem, not for the restoration of the Temple and the sacrifices. I do not harbor these wishes in my heart." He proposed that the study of Talmudic law should be replaced by an analysis of the country's laws. Friedlaender even wanted to enlist the help of the government in his endeavors for reform. In part as a result of his efforts, a "Jewish free school" was established in 1778; Friedlaender became the organizer and supervisor of the school, which he directed for almost 20 years, with his brother-in-law Daniel Itzig, along with the Hebrew press and bookshop associated with it—the institution aimed at putting into practice the ideals of enlightened education.

From 1783 to 1812 Friedlaender, as the representative of Prussian Jewry, fought assiduously for the implementation of its demands for equal rights. He headed the "general deputies" of the Jewish communities of Prussia who assembled in Berlin in order to submit their requests to the commission set up by Frederick William II of Prussia in 1787. Under Friedlaender's leadership, the deputies rejected the unsatisfactory "Plan for Reform" proposed by the commission. In 1793 he published the documents pertaining to these negotiations under the title Acktenstücke, die Reform der jüdischen. Kolonien in den preussischen Staaten betreffend. In 1809 Friedlaender was the first Jew elected to sit in the municipal council. Continuing the struggle for emancipation, in 1810 he requested an audience with the Prussian chancellor, Carl August von Hardenberg; as an argument in favor of granting emancipation, he pointed to the "wave of baptisms" which indicated the degree of assimilation of Prussian Jewry. Friedlaender's efforts for the emancipation of Prussian Jews are especially important since in they reflected the main dilemma of Jewish life in Prussia in the first generation after Mendelssohn: how to hold fast to a Jewish identity within a society based on universalist principles.

== The "dry baptism" initiative ==
Friedländer was concerned with endeavors to facilitate for himself and other Jews entry into Christian circles. This disposition was evidenced in 1799 by his radical proposal to a leading Protestant provost in Berlin (Oberconsistorialrat) Wilhelm Teller.

Friedländer's open letter (Sendschreiben) "in the name of some Jewish heads of families," stated that Jews would be ready to undergo "dry baptism": join the Lutheran Church on the basis of shared moral values if they were not required to believe in the divinity of Jesus and might evade certain Christian ceremonies. Much of the Open Letter was a polemic arguing that the Mosaic rituals were largely obsolete. So Judaism would thereby in return abandon many of its ceremonial features. The proposal "envisioned the establishment of a confederated unitarian church-synagogue."

This "Sendschreiben an Seine Hochwürden Herrn Oberconsistorialrath und Probst Teller zu Berlin, von einigen Hausvätern Jüdischer Religion" (Berlin, 1799), elicited over a score of responses in pamphlets and the popular press, including ones from Abraham Teller and Friedrich Schleiermacher. Both rejected the notion of a sham conversion to Christianity as harmful to Christianity and the State, though, in line with Enlightenment values, neither precluded the idea of more civil rights for unconverted Jews. Jewish reaction to Friedländer's initiative was overwhelmingly hostile – it was called "a dishonorable act" and "desertion". Heinrich Graetz called him an "ape".

In 1816, when the Prussian government decided to improve the situation of the Polish Jews, Franciszek Skarbek von Malczewski, Bishop of Kujawy, consulted Friedländer. Friedländer gave the bishop a circumstantial account of the material and intellectual condition of the Jews, and indicated the means by which it might be ameliorated.

== Literary career ==
Friedländer displayed great activity in literary work. Induced by Moses Mendelssohn, he began the translation into German of some parts of the Bible according to Mendelssohn's commentary. He translated Mendelssohn's "Sefer ha-Nefesh", Berlin, 1787, and "Ḳohelet", 1788. He wrote a Hebrew commentary to Abot and also translated it, Vienna, 1791; "Reden der Erbauung gebildeten Israeliten gewidmet", Berlin, 1815-17; "Moses Mendelssohn, von ihm und über ihn", ib. 1819; "Ueber die Verbesserung der Israeliten im Königreich Polen", ib. 1819, this being the answer which he wrote to the Bishop of Kujawia; "Beiträge zur Geschichte der Judenverfolgung im XIX. Jahrhundert durch Schriftsteller", ib. 1820.

Friedländer was assessor of the Royal College of Manufacture and Commerce of Berlin, and the first Jew to sit in the municipal council of that city. His wealth enabled him to be a patron of science and art, among those he encouraged being the brothers Alexander and Wilhelm von Humboldt.

== Works ==
- Lesebuch für jüdische Kinder, Nachdr. d. Ausg. Berlin, Voss, 1779 / neu hrsg. u. mit Einl. u. Anh. vers. von Zohar Shavit, Frankfurt am Main : dipa-Verl., 1990. ISBN 3-7638-0132-4
- Übersetzung von Moses Mendelssohns Sefer ha-Nefesh. Berlin, 1787.
- Übersetzung von Moses Mendelssohns Ḳohelet. 1788.
- David Friedländers Schrift: Ueber die durch die neue Organisation der Judenschaften in den preußischen Staaten nothwendig gewordene Umbildung 1) ihres Gottesdienstes in den Synagogen, 2) ihrer Unterrichts-Anstalten und deren Lehrgegenstände und 3) ihres Erziehungwesens überhaupt : Ein Wort zu seiner Zeit. - Neudr. nebst Anh. der Ausgabe Berlin, in Comm. bei W. Dieterici, 1812. Berlin: Verl. Hausfreund, 1934. (Beiträge zur Geschichte der Jüdischen Gemeinde zu Berlin / Stern.
- Reden der Erbauung gebildeten Israeliten gewidmet. Berlin, 1815–17.
- Moses Mendelssohn, von ihm und über ihn. Berlin, 1819.
- Ueber die Verbesserung der Israeliten im Königreich Polen. Berlin, 1819.
- Beiträge zur Geschichte der Judenverfolgung im XIX. Jahrhundert durch Schriftsteller. Berlin, 1820.

== See also ==
- Moses Mendelssohn
- Haskalah
- Reform Judaism
- Leibzoll
- Itzig family
- Heinrich Josefsohn
- History of the Jews in Königsberg
