= Hirsch Janow =

Josef Hirsch Janow (1733 – 13 November 1785) was a Polish rabbi, who, on account of his great keenness in Talmudical discussions, was commonly called "Hirsch Ḥarif" (the acute). When in 1776 his father-in-law, Raphael Kohn, was elected rabbi of the 3 congregations Hamburg, Altona, and Wandsbek, he succeeded him as rabbi of Posen. In the following year he was called to the rabbinate of Fürth. In 1779 he interdicted Moses Mendelssohn's German translation of the Pentateuch. Salomon Maimon, in his Lebensgeschichte (pp 280 et seq.), highly praises Hirsch Janow for his benevolence. He died at Fürth, Bavaria, on 13 November 1785.

== Jewish Encyclopedia bibliography ==
- Grätz, Gesch. xi.44, 586-587.
