= Bikkure ha-Ittim =

19th-century Austrian Jewish periodical

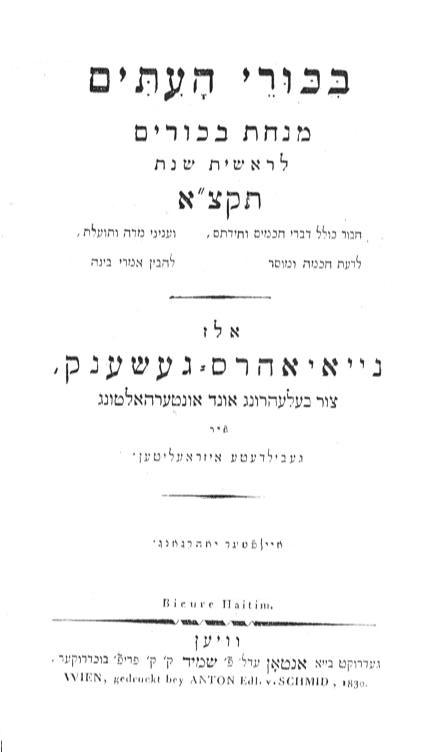
- Title page of the 1830 edition
- Founder: Salomon Jacob Cohen
- Publisher: Anton Edler von Schmid
- Editor: Salomon Jacob Cohen; Moses Landau; Solomon Pergamenter; Baer Schlesinger; Judah Jeitteles
- Founded: 1820
- Ceased publication: 1831
- Language: Hebrew, German
- City: Vienna
- Country: Austrian Empire

Bikkure ha-Ittim (Hebrew: בִּכּוּרֵי הָעִתִּים, lit. 'First-Fruits of the Times') was a Hebrew-language annual published in Vienna from 1820 to 1831. Founded by Salomon Jacob Cohen, it was adopted by the Galician Maskilim as their means to promote culture and education among Galician Jews. The publication was a forerunner of modern Hebrew journalism and played a significant role in the revival of the Hebrew language.

== History ==
Bikkure ha-Ittim originally appeared as a supplement to the Hebrew calendar Ittim Mezumanim. In 1822, it stopped being a supplement and became an independent magazine.

The magazine mostly featured contributions from writers in Galicia, Bohemia, and the Italian-Austrian provinces. It had a significant impact on European Jews in the first half of the 19th century. According to Delitzsch, Bikkure ha-Ittim also became the publication of the New-German school of poetry in Austria, with the influence of Schiller as evident in the magazine as Lessing's influence was in Ha-Me'assef.

The early issues of the magazine contained a mix of Hebrew and German articles (written in Hebrew characters) and reprints from the defunct Ha-Me'assef. The magazine gradually improved in both style and content and eventually became the chief publication for the greatest Hebrew writers of the era, including Samuel David Luzzatto, Solomon Judah Löb Rapoport, and Isaac Samuel Reggio, who contributed to it for many years. Bikkure ha-Ittim also nurtured the talents of many young Hebrew writers, such as Isaac Erter, who published some of his highly regarded papers on elegant composition and wit in the magazine.

Publication of Bikkure ha-Ittim ceased in 1831. Two attempts to revive the journal, one by Max Emanuel Stern in 1844 and another by Isaac Samuel Reggio and Isidor Bush, were unsuccessful.

== Notable contributors ==
Among the periodical's contributors were:

- Abraham Aberle
- Isaac Benjacob
- Jacob Samuel Bick
- Berish Blumenfeld
- David Caro
- Aaron Chorin
- Baruch Czatzkes
- Lelio Della Torre
- Isaac Erter
- Josef Flesch
- Judah Jeitteles
- Max Letteris
- Solomon Judah Löb Rapoport
- Solomon Pergamenter
- Joachim Pollak
- Isaac Samuel Reggio
- David Samoscz
- Baer Schlesinger
- Baruch Schönfeld
- Yom-Tob Spitz
- Marcus Strelisker
- Gabriel Südfeld
- Samuel David Luzzatto
- Samuele Vita Zelman
