= Samson Bloch =

Galician Hebrew-language writer (1782–1845)

- Born: 1782; Kulikow, Galicia
- Died: 7 October 1845 (aged 62–63); Kulikow, Galicia
- Writing career
- Pen name: S. B. H. (שב״ה)
- Literary movement: Haskalah

Samson Bloch ha-Levi (Yiddish: שמשון בלאָך הלוי, romanized: Shimshon Blokh ha-Levi; 1782 – 7 October 1845) was a major figure of the Haskalah in Galicia. He is best known for his work Shevilei Olam, the first general geography written in Hebrew.

== Biography ==
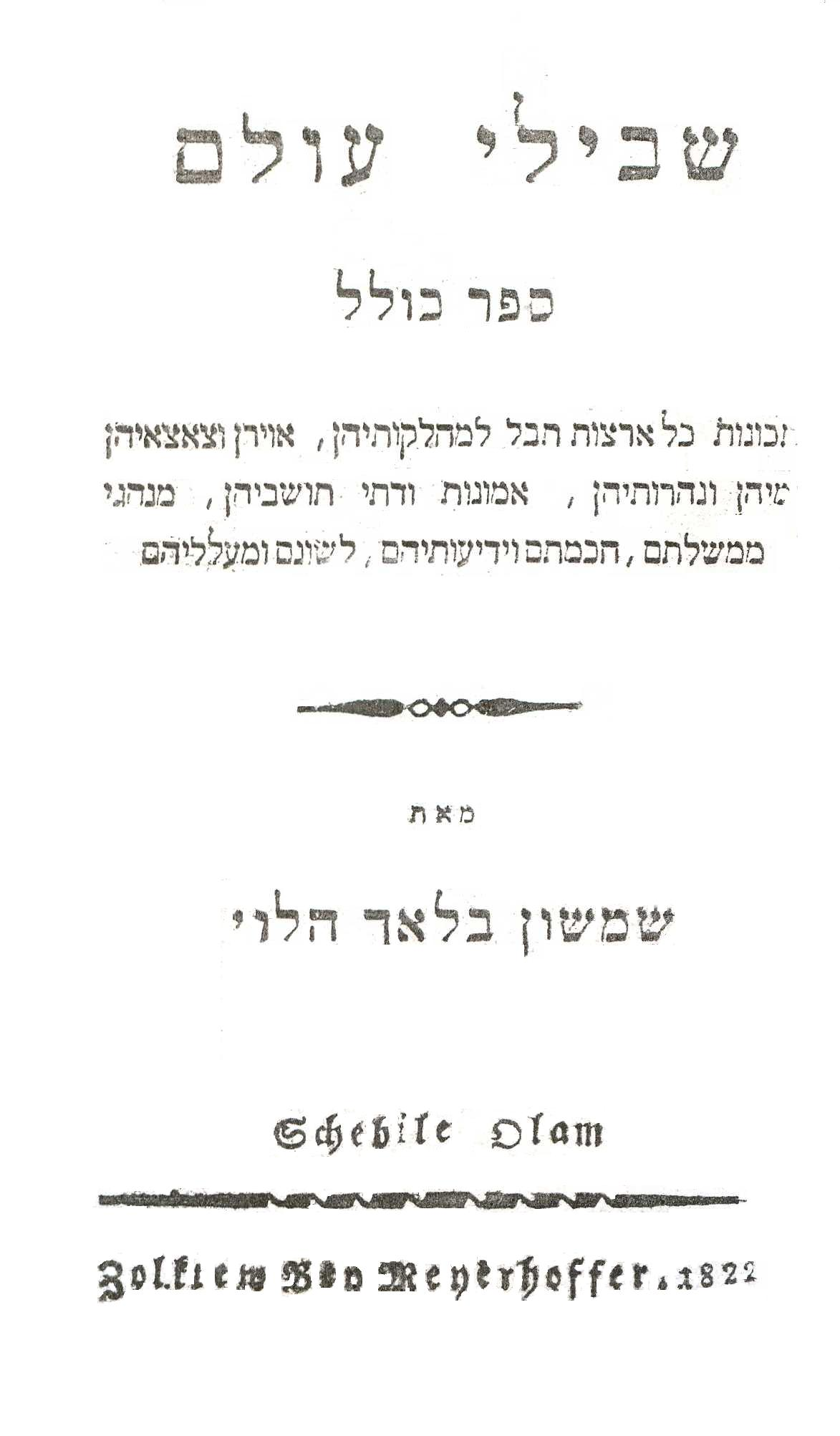
Title page of Shevile olam (1822)

Samson Bloch was born in 1782 in Kulikow, near Lvov, in what is now Ukraine. He received a traditional Talmudic education but, unusually for the time, also studied the Bible and Hebrew grammar. He later studied German and other languages, as well as Jewish and non-Jewish commentaries on the Bible. Through his uncle, Baruch Tzvi Neu, he met Nachman Krochmal, and the two became friends. Despite a lack of business training and success, Bloch's passion for knowledge and determination to make a name for himself in literature helped him endure poverty.

Bloch was a devoted advocate of the Haskalah movement. His first literary work was the publication of an epistle written by Shlomo ibn Aderet against the study of philosophy by young men, and the famous response by Jedaiah Bedersi known as Hitnatslut ha-Bedarsh (Lemberg, 1809). In 1812, Bloch was called to Vienna to work as a corrector in the Hebrew printing establishment of Anton Schmid, a position made vacant by the death of the grammarian Ben-Ze'ev. There, he translated Manasseh ben Israel's Vindiciæ Judæorum from the German translation by Markus Herz, and published it with an introduction and biographical sketch of the author (Vienna, 1813). The book received an approbation from Moshe Kunitz.

However, family affairs forced Bloch to return to Kulikow. After several years of poverty, he took up writing Hebrew books professionally at the urging of Krochmal and Rapoport. In 1822, the first volume of his major work Shevile 'Olam, a description of the geography and nations of Asia, was published in Zolkiev. The second volume, on Africa, includes biographies of Isaac Alfasi and Maimonides, among others. The unfinished third part on Europe was published posthumously in 1855 under the title Zehav Shebah.

Bloch traveled through Hungary, Bohemia, Moravia, and Austria to obtain subscriptions for his work. He was honored and assisted by enlightened individuals, but the treatment of Hebrew authors by the general public, particularly the wealthy and ignorant, so disgusted him that he never finished the volume on Europe, although sections on Spain, Portugal, and part of France were already written. His last years were spent in poverty and solitude. He died in Kulikow, leaving his nine-year-old daughter in the care of his friend Hirsch Chajes of Zolkiev.

Besides his major works, Bloch also translated Zunz's biography of Rashi, to which he wrote an introduction and many notes (Lemberg, 1840). He also wrote many letters on literature which appeared in various Hebrew periodicals and collections. The most important of them is probably the one about philosophy and on Kant, published in Kerem Ḥemed.

== Publications ==
- Hitnatslut ha-Bedarsh. Lemberg. 1809.
- Teshu'at Yisrael. Vienna. 1813.
- Shevilei 'Olam [Paths of the World]. Zolkiev. 1822.
- Shevilei 'Olam [Paths of the World]. Zolkiev. 1827.
- Zehav Shebah [The Gold of Sheba]. Lemberg: N. M. Schorr. 1855.
