= Mordecai Strelisker =

Galician Jewish writer (1806–1875)

- Born: 8 November 1806; Brody, Galicia, Kingdom of Galicia and Lodomeria
- Died: 15 October 1875 (aged 68); Mihăileni, Romania
- Resting place: Mihăileni Jewish Cemetery
- Writing career
- Pen name: Marvad Sat
- Language: Hebrew
- Literary movement: Haskalah

Mordecai ben David Strelisker (Hebrew: מרדכי בן־דוד סטרעליסקער; 8 November 1806 – 15 October 1875), also known by the acronym Marvad Sat (מרב״ד ס״ט), was a Romanian Maskilic writer, poet, and ḥazzan. He served as cantor in the synagogue of Mihăileni.

== Biography ==
Strelisker was born in Brody, Galicia, in 1806, the son of David and Feyge Strelisker. His paternal grandfather was from the Galician town of Strelisk. He spent his youth in his native town, where he acquired a knowledge of Hebrew literature under the instruction of Isaac Erter and Nachman Krochmal.

Strelisker's most important literary contributions are twelve essays in volumes 8–11 of Bikkure ha-Ittim. He also carried on a literary correspondence with Judah Jeitteles in Kerem Ḥemed (ii. 183). His other published works include Zakat shever, a lamentation on the death of Zalman Margulies; Ta'aniyat yeshurun, an elegy on the death of Emperor Francis I of Austria, sung during a mourning ceremony held in the old Brody synagogue; Zekher 'olam, a biography and an elegy of his father; and Shirah la-kohen (reprinted from Ha-Maggid, 1860), on the occasion of the seventieth birthday of J. S. Rappaport.

He was also an activist of the Alliance Israélite Universelle, and advocated for rationalism in Judaism, modern Jewish education, and the emancipation of Romanian Jewry.

He died in Mihăileni during Sukkot in October 1875.

== Publications ==
- Zakat shever [A Cry of Destruction]. Vienna. 1829.
- Ta'aniyat yeshurun [Cries of Jeshurun]. Zolkiev. 1835.
- Kos ha-tar'elah [A Cup of Poison]. Zolkiev: Saul Meyerhoffer. 1835.
- Ha-serefah [The Fire]. Zolkiev: Saul Meyerhoffer. 1835.
- Zekher 'olam [Eternal Memory]. Lemberg: Joseph Schnayder. 1849.
- Shirah la-kohen [Poem to a Cohen]. 1860.
- Todah u-berakhah [Thanks and Blessing]. Czernowitz: Rudolf Eckhardt. 1868.
- Shnei ha-me'orot ha-gedolim [The Two Great Lights]. Lemberg: Mikhl Volf. 1870.
