= Isidor Bush =

Austrian-American publisher

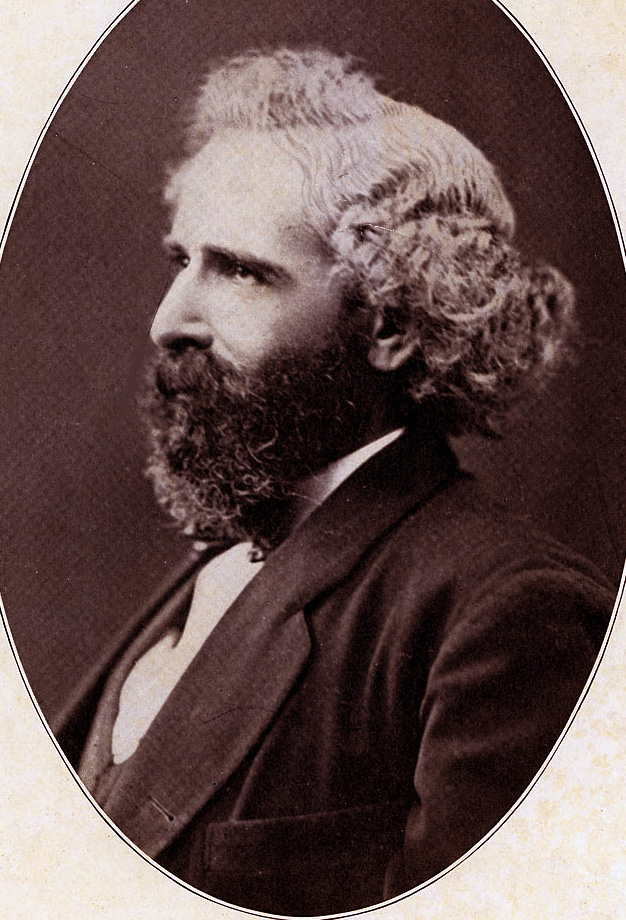
Isidor Bush

Isidor Bush or Busch (January 15, 1822, Prague – August 5, 1898, St. Louis, Missouri) was a man of letters, publisher, and viticulturalist.

His maternal great-grandfather was Israel Hönig, Edler von Hönigsberg, the first Jew raised to nobility in Austria.

== "Jahrbücher" ==
At age 15, he entered Anton von Schmid's printing establishment in Vienna, which his father had acquired. The Talmud published with the imprint of Von Schmid and Bush was prized for some time afterwards for its exactness. For six years (1842–47), Bush edited and published the Kalender und Jahrbuch für Israeliten (Vienna). Its plan was the presentation in the same book of the productions of leading Jewish scholars of divergent views. Among these were S. L. Rapoport, S. D. Luzzatto, Gotthold Salomon, Ludwig Philippson, Isaac Noah Mannheimer, Theodor Creizenach, Ludwig August von Frankl, Leopold Kompert, and Leopold Löw. Some of these made their first appearance as writers in the pages of the "Jahrbücher". In 1844, he edited Mesillat ha-Limmud (Way of Instruction), which was published by his father after Bush had left for America. Liberal in politics, Bush edited the Osterreichisches Zentral-Organ für Glaubensfreiheit, and other revolutionary papers issued from his press.

== Career in the USA ==
When the Revolution of 1848 failed, he had to flee to New York City, where he arrived on January 8, 1849. There, Bush opened a store for the sale of newspapers and stationery and, on March 30, 1849, published the initial number of Israel's Herald, the first Jewish weekly in the United States which, however, lasted only three months. He was assisted in its production by leading members of the Order B'nai B'rith.

In the summer of 1849, Bush went to St. Louis, where he managed a general store for six years. In 1857, Bush was made president of the People's Savings Bank. When the Missouri Convention was called to determine whether the state should join in the secession movement, Bush was chosen a member on the Unconditional Union ticket, and was made a member of the Committee of Nine, to which most important matters were referred.

When Fremont took command in 1861, with headquarters in St. Louis, Bush was made his aide-de-camp, with the rank of captain. He submitted to Secretary of the Treasury Chase a plan for a government loan of one hundred million dollars, similar to the famous Rothschild premium loans of Austria. Chase feared its rejection by Congress, but was impressed with Bush's financial genius, and offered him a Treasury clerkship. Bush returned shortly afterward to St. Louis, and became for six years a general freight and passenger agent of the St. Louis and Iron Mountain Railroad Company.

Bush assisted in forming Congregation B'ne El in St. Louis along with Daniel Block and in establishing the Independent Order B'nai B'rith in the West, and was henceforth prominently identified with the Order, rendering especially useful service in connection with its endowment or insurance feature, and in forming the Cleveland Jewish Orphan Asylum. His interest in the society led him to become an insurance actuary.

Bush was chosen member of the state convention called to abolish slavery and to form a new constitution. He was elected a member of the Missouri state board of immigration to repair losses in population resulting from the war, a post he retained for twelve years. Later in life, Bush became interested in viticulture. He purchased a tract of land (named by him "Bushberg") outside the city, which became noted for its products; he even sent large quantities of cuttings from his vineyards to France to replace ravages by phylloxera.

Bush, after years of preparation, published a catalogue of grapes, The Bushberg Catalogue, which has gone through several editions and has been translated into several languages.

Bush died in St. Louis in 1898 and was buried in Bellefontaine Cemetery.
