= Eliakim ha-Milzahgi =

Polish-born Talmudist

Eliakim Getzel ben Judah ha-Milzahgi (Note: Milzahgi is a Hebrew derivative of Mehlsack, the German name for the author's hometown of Smiela / Samilia. He was alternatively known as Eliakim Mehlsack (אליקים מהלזק), Eliakim Samiler (אליקים סמילר), and Eliakim Smieler (אליקים סמיאלר).) (Hebrew: אליקים גצל בן יהודה המילזאהגי; c. 1780, Smiela – 17 July 1854, Brody), also known by the acronym Rabiyah (ראבי״ה), was a Polish-born Talmudist.

== Biography ==
Eliakim Getzel ha-Milzahgi was born in the Polish town of Smiela into a prominent rabbinical family that included scholars Ephraim Zalman Margolioth and Jacob of Lissa. He settled in Galicia, where he studied with Kabbalist Israel Ḥarif of Satanov. He worked as the rabbi of a small town, and later as a teacher and merchant in Lemberg and Brody, all while pursuing Jewish scholarship under the patronage of Berish Blumenfeld.

Ha-Milzahgi wrote primarily about Talmud and Kabbalah. The only published book of his was Sefer Rabiyah (Ofen, 1837), a criticism of Leopold Zunz's Die gottesdienstlichen Vorträgeder Juden: historisch entwickelt and of Solomon Judah Loeb Rapoport's biography of Eleazar ben Kalir. The work contains a critique of gematria, and a dissertation on Kabbalistic literature.

He also wrote unpublished commentaries on the Zohar, the Sefer Raziel HaMalakh, and the Pesikta de-Rav Kahana. He published in the Jewish press a denunciation of the alleged forgeries of Abraham Firkovich, and, in his essay Mirkevet Esh, he argued in favour of permitting train travel on the Sabbath.
