= Berish Blumenfeld =

Galician Jewish Hebraist, someone who specialises in Jewish and Hebrew studies

- Born: 1779
- Died: 1853 (aged 73–74)
- Writing career
- Language: Hebrew
- Literary movement: Haskalah

Berish Blumenfeld (Yiddish: בּעריש בּלומענפֿעלד; 1779–1853) was a Galician Jewish Hebraist.

He was the author of a German translation of the Book of Job, which he published with a Hebrew commentary (Vienna, 1826). A poem, "Motar ha-Adam" (lit. 'Superiority of Man'), by Blumenfeld, was published in Bikkure ha-'Ittim. He also published the works of Eliakim ben Judah ha-Milzahgi under the title Sefer Ravyah (Ofen, 1837).

Blumenfeld's views on the authorship and date of Job were the subject of a correspondence with Samuel David Luzzatto, who insisted that Job was one of the oldest books of the canon. Blumenfeld corresponded as well with Isaac Baer Levinsohn and assisted in the spread of the latter's works. He was an intimate friend of Shimson Bloch ha-Levi, who dedicated to him his Hebrew translation of Manasseh ben Israel's Vindiciæ Judæorum.
