= Isaac Baer Levinsohn =

Russian writer (1788–1860)

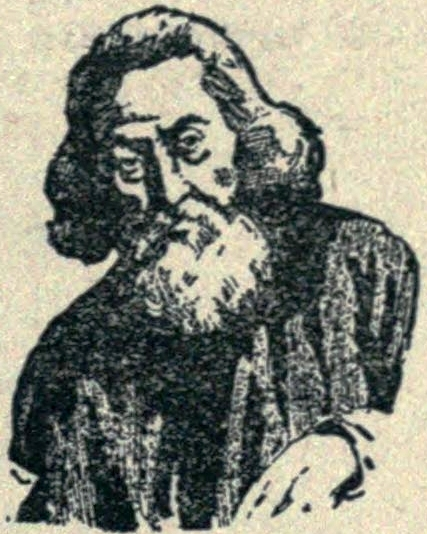
- Born: October 13, 1788; Kremenetz, Volhynian Voivodeship, Polish-Lithuanian Commonwealth
- Died: February 13, 1860 (aged 71); Kremenetz, Volhynian Governorate, Russian Empire
- Occupation: Writer
- Writing career
- Language: Hebrew
- Literary movement: Haskalah

Isaac Baer Levinsohn (Yiddish: יצחק בער לעווינזאהן; October 13, 1788 – February 13, 1860), also known as the Ribal (ריב״ל), was a Jewish scholar of Hebrew, a satirist, a writer and Haskalah leader. He has been called "the Mendelssohn of Russia." In his Bet Yehudah (1837), he formulated a philosophy and described Jewish contributions to civilization in an effort to improve Jewish-Christian relations.

== Biography ==
=== Early life and education ===
His father, Judah Levin, was a grandson of Jekuthiel Solomon, who settled in Kremenetz and acquired considerable wealth, and a son of Isaac, who had married the daughter of Zalman Cohen, famed for his wealth and scholarship. Levinsohn's father was a wealthy merchant and was popular among Jews and Gentiles alike. He was a master of Polish, wrote fluently in classical Hebrew (at that time a rare accomplishment), and was a thorough Talmudic scholar. At the age of three Levinsohn was sent to the ḥeder, where he soon manifested unusual aptitude for learning; and at nine he composed a Kabbalistic work that elicited the praise of scholars and rabbis. At ten he was versed in Talmudic lore, and knew the Tanakh by heart. Thanks to his great mental power and industry, he rapidly familiarized himself with the rabbinical literature. At eighteen he married and settled in Radzivilov, supporting himself by teaching and translating; his married life, however, was unhappy, and he divorced his wife.

=== Career ===
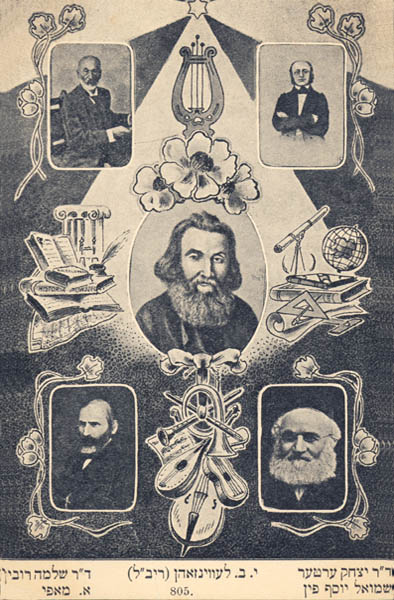
Image of Levinsohn (centre) with fellow Maskilim Isaac Erter, Samuel Joseph Fuenn, Solomon Rubin, and Abraham Mapu.

Some of Levinsohn's first literary efforts were in the domain of Hebrew poetry. Among others, he wrote a patriotic poem on the expulsion of the French from the Russian Empire, which was transmitted to the minister of the interior by General Giers, the commandant of the Radzivilov garrison. Levinsohn himself regarded his verses as mere literary exercises, and did not attempt to print them; the greater part of them was lost. Excessive study brought on nervous disorders, and Levinsohn journeyed to Brody, then the centre of the Haskalah, in order to consult the local physicians. There the future reformer of the Ukrainian Jews found a congenial atmosphere in the circle of the Maskilim. He soon made the acquaintance of Isaac Erter, the Hebrew satirist, and later of Solomon Rapoport. Though engaged as a bookkeeper in the local bank, he found time to continue his studies. Before long he passed the teacher's examinations and was appointed to teach Hebrew at the gymnasium of Tarnopol. There he soon became intimate with the scholar Joseph Perl, through whose influence he secured an instructorship at the Hebrew college of Brody.

Levinsohn's new position brought him into close relations with Nachman Krochmal of Zolkiev, an authority on all questions of rabbinical learning and Jewish custom. In 1817 he submitted to Krochmal his first critical study, entitled Ha-Mazkir, and Krochmal was so favorably impressed with the work that he offered to contribute toward the expense of publication. Unfortunately, it was never printed, and only a part of it was incorporated in Te'uddah and Bet Yehudah.

About this time he wrote a satire on the Hasidim entitled Dibre Tzaddikim. Returning to Kremenetz in the same year, he began his Te'uddah be-Yisrael, a work destined to leave an indelible impression on a whole generation of Ukrainian Jews. It was finished in 1823, but was not published until 1828. The book attempted to solve many problems of contemporary Jewish life in Ukraine. It urged the study of the Scriptures before the Talmud, and the necessity of studying secular languages, particularly that of one's country of residence. It urged also the study of science and literature, and the great importance for the Jews of engaging in agricultural and industrial work. It strongly counselled the abandoning of petty trade and of other uncertain sources of livelihood.

Levinsohn's advice did not please the Hasidim, who opposed him in many ways and so embittered his existence that he was compelled to leave Kremenetz. Repairing to Berdychev, he became a private tutor in the family of a wealthy Jew, and, gathering about him a circle of progressive friends, organized a society for the promotion of culture. Regarding it as his special mission to carry enlightenment to the young generation, he resided successively in Ostrog, Nemirov, and Tulchin. On his way to the last named place Levinsohn stopped at Kaminka, the estate of Prince Witgenstein, the field-marshal of the Russian Empire. When the prince heard of Levinsohn's arrival he invited him to his house, assigned him a suite of rooms, and kept him there through the entire summer. The field-marshal liked to pass his evenings in conversation with the learned Jew, and often followed the latter's advice.

=== Later life ===
In 1823, Levinsohn was compelled by failing health to return to Kremenetz. Soon after his arrival there he was confined to his bed by a sickness that kept him bedridden for twelve years. Notwithstanding this, he never resigned himself to mental inactivity, and during these long years of suffering he made himself familiar with Arabic, Greek, and Syriac, and studied the classics, political economy, and philosophy.

Levinsohn laboured assiduously for the well-being of his coreligionists in Ukraine. He worked out and submitted to the government various projects for the amelioration of the condition of the Jews, such as the plan he submitted to the crown prince Konstantin in 1823, his memorandum to the minister of education in 1831, his project in regard to the censorship of Jewish books in 1833, and his plan for the establishment of Jewish colonies in 1837. Nicholas I gave the last careful consideration. It is known, also, that the emperor wrote Levinsohn a personal letter in regard to this plan, but its contents are not known. The establishment of Jewish agricultural colonies in Bessarabia in 1838–39 and later and the organization of Jewish educational institutions undoubtedly owed much to Levinsohn's suggestions. The government appreciated his services, and, besides monetary rewards, offered him important positions, which he declined. The failure of his health compelled him to decline also appointment as member of the Jewish commission that sat in St. Petersburg in 1843, and in 1853 he again refused an appointment as member of the special commission on Jewish affairs. The following words were inscribed, at his own request, on his tombstone: "Out of nothing God called me to life. Alas, earthly life has passed, and I shall sleep again on the bosom of Mother Nature, as this stone testifies. I have fought the enemies of God not with the sharp sword, but with the Word. That I have fought for truth and justice before the Nations, Zerubbabel and Efes Damim bear witness."

He died in Kremenetz on February 13, 1860.

== Work ==
=== Te'uddah ===
In 1827, a year before the appearance of Te'uddah, Levinsohn presented the manuscript, with an explanatory statement, to the Russian Imperial government, which accepted it with much favor, and awarded Levinsohn, on the representations of D. N. Bludov, a thousand rubles "for a work in Hebrew having for its object the moral education of the Jewish people." In the same year the minister of public instruction, Prince Lieven, submitted to Levinsohn thirty-four questions on Jewish religion and history, among them the following: "What is the Talmud?", "Who was the author of it?", "When, where, and in what language was it written?", "Have the Jews other books of such authority?", "Is there anything sensible in the Talmud? It is stated that it is full of improbable legends and fables.", "How could the authors of the Talmud permit themselves to add to, or detract from, the commandments of the Torah, which forbids that?", "What is the object of the numerous rites that consume so much useful time?", "Is it true that the Jews are the descendants of those Pharisees whom the lawgiver of the Christians had accused of lying and superstition?", "Is it true that the Talmud forbids the Jews the study of foreign languages and science, as well as the pursuit of agricultural occupations?", "What is Ḥasidism, and who was its founder?", "In what towns mainly do the Ḥasidim reside?", "Do the Jews possess schools or learned books?", "How do the Jewish masses regard their schools?", "Can the condition of the Jews be improved? and, if so, by what means?", "What Messiah is it that the Jews are expecting?", "Is it true that the Jews expect to rule the entire world when the Messiah arrives, and that members of other religions will be excluded from participation in the after-life?", and "How can a Jew be admitted into Christian society and be accorded full civic rights when he keeps himself aloof from the Christians and takes no interest in the welfare of the country where he resides?" Levinsohn referred the minister to his Te'uddah and to other works in various languages, transmitted to him concise answers to his questions, and promised to write a book in which these questions would be discussed in detail.

In 1828 Te'uddah saw the light. "It was not the yearning for fame," says Levinsohn in the preface, "that impelled me to write this book. ... Friends seeking truth and light asked me to point out to them the true way of life; they wish to know what learning, aside from the Talmud and its commentaries, it is necessary for a Jew to acquire for the perfection and refinement of his nature as a man and a Jew."

Levinsohn claims that Greek philosophy originated with the Jews.

=== Bet Yehudah ===
Title page of Bet Yehudah (1878 edition).

Levinsohn now undertook his larger work, Bet Yehudah, which was "to expose to Christian eyes the world of Jewish spiritual life founded on the principles of highest morality, a world then unknown to Ukrainian Christians." He wished, also, to make his work of educational value to the Jewish people, so that uninstructed coreligionists would see Judaism in its true light. At the same time he found himself obliged to exercise great care in the treatment of the subject in order to avoid creating undue antagonism. Levinsohn presents in his "Bet Yehudah" a wonderfully clear and logical exposition of Jewish religious philosophy. According to him the Jewish religion may be summed up in two principles of belief: faith in one God, which involves the negation of idol-worship; and love of one's neighbour. He shows by numerous citations that the latter means the love not only of one Jew for another, but the love for any neighbour, irrespective of faith. He presents a history of the various Jewish sects, enumerates the contributions of the Jews to learning and civilization, and at the end suggests a plan for the reorganization of Jewish education in Ukraine. He urges the necessity of founding rabbinical seminaries fashioned after the German institutions, training the Jewish youth in religious and secular learning, opening elementary Jewish schools throughout the Pale, abolishing the institution of melammedim, and establishing agricultural and industrial schools.

Bet Yehudah exerted a powerful influence on the Jews of Russian Empire and gave a plan of action to the progressive elements in Russian Empire Jewry. The book acquired renown outside of the Russian Empire also. It was translated into Polish, and the scholar Geiger read several chapters of it before an audience in the Breslau synagogue. But though Bet Yehudah was completed in 1829, it remained unpublished until 1838.

=== Efes Dammim and other polemical works ===
Title page of Efes Dammim (1884 edition).

Around this time, the Jewish community of Zaslavl in Volhynia was accused of ritual murder; many families were imprisoned, and the entire community was in despair. Levinsohn's opponents then laid aside their enmity and turned to him as the only man capable of proving the falsity of the accusation. In spite of his sickness Levinsohn began his Efes Dammim, in defense of the accused Jews. But the necessary means not being forthcoming, he was obliged to spend his own money in collecting material and information. "The purpose of my book," says Levinsohn, "is to acquit the Jews before the eyes of Christians, and to save them from the false accusation of using Christian blood." Efes Dammim is written in the form of a dialogue between a patriarch of the Greek Church in Jerusalem, Simias, and the chief rabbi in the Jewish synagogue there. The book shows the remarkable dialectic talent of the author. It was completed in 1834, published in 1837, republished three times, and was translated into English at the time of the "Damascus Affair" in 1840, at the instance of Sir Moses Montefiore and Adolphe Crémieux. It was translated also into Russian (1883) and German (1884; another German edition appeared in 1892). Another polemical work, Yemin Tzidki, Levinsohn proves the absurdity of the accusations against Judaism and the Talmud. This work was left by him in manuscript.

Other polemical works written by Levinsohn are Aḥiyyah Shiloni ha-Ḥozeh (Leipzig, 1841) and Ta'ar ha-Sofer (Odessa, 1863). Aḥiyyah Shiloni ha-Ḥozeh is directed against the work of the English missionary Alexander McCaul entitled The Paths of the World (London, 1839), and constitutes an introduction to Levinsohn's larger work Zerubbabel, completed in 1853. This latter work was published, in part, by his nephew David Baer Nathansohn (Leipzig, 1863); the entire work was published later in Warsaw (1876). This work, which occupied twelve years, and was continued through sickness and suffering, was not only a defense of Judaism, but also an exposition of the value of traditional law in the Jewish religion, and of the great wisdom and moral force of its expounders and teachers. The Ta'ar ha-Sofer is directed against the Karaites.

=== Levinsohn as a philologist ===
In addition to these, Levinsohn wrote on Hebrew etymology and comparative philology. In this field he published Bet ha-Oẓar, the first and second parts of which appeared in Vilna in 1841; the first part is entitled Shorashe Lebanon, and includes studies of Hebrew roots; the second part comprises articles on various subjects, and Abne Millu'im, a supplement to Bet Yehudah. After Levinsohn's death Nathansohn published Toledot Shem (Warsaw, 1877) and Ohole Shem (Warsaw, 1893), both containing philological studies arranged in alphabetical order, and also corrections of Ben Zeb's Otzar ha-Shorashim, which was republished by Letteris. Levinsohn left a number of works in manuscript, including Pittuḥe Ḥotam, on the period of the Canticles; Yizre El, miscellaneous essays; Be'er Yitzḥak, correspondence with contemporary scholars; and Eshkol ha-Sofer, letters, poetry, and humorous papers.

=== Discussions of vegetarianism ===
Joseph Jacobs and Judah David Eisenstein have suggested that Levinsohn may have been the first Jewish figure to discuss "the modern question of vegetarianism." According to Jacobs and Eisenstein, Levinsohn justifies the strictness of the rules of ṭerefah with reference to vegetetarianism, and he attributes the longevity of the generations from Adam to Noah to their vegetarian diet. The good morals and keen intellect of the Jews, he says, are largely due to their scant eating of meat.
