= Samuele Vita Zelman =

Italian Jewish writer (1808–1885)

- שמואל חיים זלמן
- Born: 1808; Trieste, Austrian Empire
- Died: 1885 (aged 76–77); Trieste, Austria-Hungary
- Occupations: Writer, poet

Samuele Vita Zelman (Hebrew: שמואל חיים זלמן; 1808, Trieste – 1885, Trieste) was an Italian Jewish writer and poet.

Zelman was educated at the rabbinical college of Padua, where he was the favourite pupil of Samuel David Luzzatto. He was the author of the following works: Kinah on the death of S. D. Luzzatto (Padua, 1865); Primi discorsi di Rab Melza (Trieste, 1854); Le Parole di un ignorante ai dotti, directed against demagogic writers (Trieste, 1855); and Ha-nitzanim, a collection of Hebrew poems (Trieste, 1883). A complete edition of his Hebrew essays, hymns, letters, elegiac poems, etc., was published by Vittorio Castiglione under the title Ne'im zemirot Shemuel, o, yelid kinor (Trieste, 1886). Some of his Hebrew poems are contained in the periodicals Bikkure ha-'ittim (vol. xi.) and Mosé (vols. v. and viii.).

== Selected bibliography ==
- I primi discorsi di Rab Melzan (in Italian). Trieste: Tipografia Marenigh. 1854.
- Le parole d'un ignorante ai dotti (in Italian). Trieste: Tipografia del Lloyd Austriaco. 1855.
- Conversazioni etimologiche (in Italian). C. Coen. 1880.
- Za'akat shever (in Hebrew). Livorno: Yisrael Kushta. 1881.
- Ha-nitzanim (in Hebrew). Trieste: Yonah Kohen. 1883.
- Ne'im zemirot Shemuel, o, yelid kinor: sefer kolel zemirot u-shirim (in Hebrew). Drohobych: A. H. Zupnik. 1886.
