= Baruch Czatzkes =

Hebrew poet and translator

Baruch Czatzkes of Lusk (Hebrew: בָּרוּךְ טשאַצקיס מלויצקאַ) was a 19th-century Volhynian Hebrew poet and translator.

Franz Delitzsch mentions him as one of the Germanizing Hebrew poets of the Bikkure ha-'Ittim school. His poem "Ha-Bitaḥon" in that periodical is translated from the Russian of Mikhail Kheraskov, likely the first instance of a German Slavic Jew translating Slavonic poetry into Hebrew. Czatzkes also contributed sixteen proverbs to Bikkure ha'Ittim, and was the author of the poem "Kol anot tefilah", which appeared in the first edition of Isaac Baer Levinsohn's Te'udah be-Yisrael.
