= Judah Jeitteles =

- Born: March 1773; Prague, Bohemia
- Died: 6 June 1838 (aged 65); Vienna, Austrian Empire
- Children: Andreas Ludwig Jeitteles
- Relatives: Jonas Jeitteles (father); Baruch Jeitteles (brother)
- Writing career
- Language: Hebrew, German

Judah ben-Jonah Jeitteles (Hebrew: יהודה בן־יונה ייטלש; March 1773 – 6 June 1838) was a Bohemian maskil and Hebrew writer.

== Biography ==
Judah Jeitteles was born to prominent Jewish physician Jonas Jeitteles in Prague, where he received a traditional Jewish education.

An advocate of education reform in Jewish schools (including for the abolition of ḥeders and for the integration of Jewish studies into the curricula of secular schools), Jeitteles was appointed supervisor of the German-language Jewish school in Prague around 1812. At the age of 40, he was elected one of four communal leaders of Prague's Jewish community, but later settled in Vienna.

He devoted himself to the study of Oriental languages and literature under the direction of his brother Baruch Jeitteles. He was the first to compose in Hebrew a grammar of Biblical Aramaic, its title being Mevo lashon Aramit (Prague, 1813). He edited and wrote commentaries on the books of Samuel, Kings, the Twelve Minor Prophets, Chronicles, Ezra, Nehemiah, and Daniel for Anton Edler von Schmid's new (fourth) edition of the Bible with German translation. Among other works, Jeitteles also published Siḥah be-erez ha-ḥayyim (Brünn, 1800), Mizmor le-todah (Prague, 1817), and Bene ha-neʻurim (Prague, 1821), besides contributing poetry and essays on history and philology to Ha-Meassef and Kerem Ḥemed. He left in manuscript a complete Aramaic-German dictionary, which explains especially the root words of the Aramaicisms occurring in the Hebrew text of the Tanakh.

== Bibliography ==
- Peraḥ al kever avi (in Hebrew). Vienna. 1807.
- Siḥah be-erez ha-ḥayyim: Gespräch über die Sekte der Sabbatäer (in Hebrew). Brünn. 1800.
- Mevo lashon Aramit (in Hebrew). Prague: Gedruckt bei Franz Scholl. 1813.
- Deutsche Reden, gehalten bei verschiedenen Gelegenheiten (in German). Prague. 1814.
- Mizmor le-todah: Dankopfer ein Psalm zum Lobe des Ewigen für die gesegnete Aerndte im Sommer 1817 (in Hebrew and German). Prague: Scholl'schen Buchdruckerei. 1817.
- Minḥat Yehuda (le-aḥav Bnei Yisrael): Gebete und Gesänge zur Feier des Geburtsfestes des Kaiser Franz I (in Hebrew). Prague: Scholl'schen Buchdruckerei. 1818.
- Trayerrede auf den Tod der Frein von Arnstein (in German). Prague. 1818.
- Bene ha-neʻurim [Sons of [One's] Youth] (in Hebrew). Prague: Scholl'schen Buchdruckerei. 1821.
- Trauungsrede gehalten bei den am 27. und 28. Mai 1823 in Regensburg vorgenommenen Trauungen der beiden Brautpaare Fräulein Louise Edlen von Lämel aus Wien mit dem bürgerlichen Kaufmann Herrn Lipmann Marx in München, dann Fräulein Jeanette Marx mit ihrem Cousin Herrn Arnold Marx Stadt-Apotheker in Ansbach (in German). Regensburg: Gedruckt bei Friedrich Heinrich Neubauer. 1823.
- Tikunim u-biurim bi-defus Rashi (in Hebrew). Vienna. 1832–1836.
- Shmuel im targum Ashkenazi u-biur (in Hebrew and German). Vienna. 1833.
- Iyov im targum Ashkenazi u-biur (in Hebrew and German). Vienna. 1834.
- Shir tehila: Volks-hymne, treu übersetzt in die hebräische und aramäische Sprache nach gleichem Vers- und Sylbenmasse zum Absingen nach der bekannten Melodie (in Hebrew and Aramaic). Vienna: Anton Edler von Schmid. 1835.
- Trei Asar im targum Ashkenazi u-biur (in Hebrew and German). Vienna. 1835.
- Divrei ha-Yamim im targum Ashkenazi u-biur (in Hebrew and German). Vienna. 1835.
- Biur al Yeḥezkel (in Hebrew). Vienna. 1842. With Max Emanuel Stern. Introduction by Judah Leib Ben-Ze'ev.
- Daniel, Ezra ve-Neḥemia meturgam u-mevoar (in Aramaic and German). Vienna. 1835.
