= Jacob Samuel Bick =

Galician Jewish playwright (1772–1831)

- Born: 6 July 1772; Brody, Commonwealth of Poland
- Died: 21 May 1831 (aged 58); Brody, Galicia, Austrian Empire
- Writing career
- Language: Hebrew
- Literary movement: Haskalah

Jacob Samuel Bick (Hebrew: יַעֲקֹב שְׁמוּאֵל בִּיק; 6 July 1772 – 21 May 1831) was a Galician Maskilic author, playwright, and translator.

Bick translated a number of French and English poems into Hebrew, and published biographies of Menachem Mendel Lefin, Ephraim Zalman Margolioth, Judah Leib Ben-Ze'ev, and others. His contributions to the Bikkure ha-ittim, Kerem ḥemed, and other Hebrew publications of his time contain strong pleas for the spread of secular knowledge and industry among Galician Jews; and, like many of his contemporaries among the Maskilim, he was strongly in favor of agricultural pursuits by Jews.

He died of cholera during an 1831 epidemic and left several manuscript works, both in prose and poetry. They were burned in the Great Fire in Brody in the spring of 1835, when the house of his son-in-law, Isaac Rothenberg, was totally destroyed. Bick was highly respected for his piety, learning, and ability; and the destruction of his literary remains was at the time deplored as a great loss.
