= Moses Mordecai Juwel =

Galician Jewish scholar (1798–1851)

Moses Mordecai Juwel (Yiddish: משׁה מרדכי יאוועל, romanized: Moshe Mordekhai Yovel; 1798–1851) was a Galician Jewish scholar, who lived in Brody in the first half of the nineteenth century.

He translated from the German into Hebrew Hufeland's Macrobiotik, or the art of prolonging human life, under the title Ruaḥ Ḥayyim (Lemberg, 1831); and a natural history, in four parts, under the title Limmude ha-Teva (Czernowitz, 1836). Juwel also wrote some ethical studies (Bikkure ha-'Ittim XII, 117 et seq.).

== Bibliography ==
- Ruaḥ Ḥayyim. Lemberg. 1831.
- Limmude ha-Teva. Czernowitz: Gedruckt bei Peter und Johann Eckhardt. 1836.
