= Zamość (disambiguation) =

Zamość is a town in the Lublin Voivodeship in southeastern Poland.

Zamość may also refer to:

- Zamość, Kuyavian-Pomeranian Voivodeship (north-central Poland)
- Zamość, Łask County in Łódź Voivodeship (central Poland)
- Zamość, Piotrków County in Łódź Voivodeship (central Poland)
- Zamość, Maków County in Masovian Voivodeship (east-central Poland)
- Zamość, Gmina Leoncin, Nowy Dwór County in Masovian Voivodeship (east-central Poland)
- Zamość, Ostrołęka County in Masovian Voivodeship (east-central Poland)
- Zamość, Sierpc County in Masovian Voivodeship (east-central Poland)
- Zamość, Wyszków County in Masovian Voivodeship (east-central Poland)
- Zamość, Konin County in Greater Poland Voivodeship (west-central Poland)
- Zamość, Gmina Sieroszewice, Ostrów County in Greater Poland Voivodeship (west-central Poland)
- Zamość, Września County in Greater Poland Voivodeship (west-central Poland)
- Zamość, Pomeranian Voivodeship (north Poland)

People:

- David Zamość (1789–1864), German writer
- Israel Zamość (c. 1700–1772), Talmudist
