= Moses Hirsch Enser =

Galician Maskilic poet and grammarian (1804–1871)

- Born: 1804; Lwów, Galicia
- Died: 15 February 1871 (aged 66–67); Lwów, Galicia
- Writing career
- Language: Hebrew
- Movement: Haskalah

Moses Hirsch Enser (Hebrew: משה צבי ענסר, romanized: Mosheh Tzvi Enser; 1804 – 15 February 1871) was a Galician Maskilic poet and grammarian.

From 1845, he published poetry in Max Emanuel Stern's Hebrew periodical Kokhve Yitzḥak, and in 1854, released Ha-Matseref; ve-hu ha-ḥelek ha-rishon mi-sefer Masaʼat Mosheh ('The Purified; or Moses's Gift'), a grammar book on the past tense. He left in manuscript the books Igrot el Assaf ('Letters to Assaf', on the Hebrew language), Ha-noten zemirot ('The Giver of Tunes', on discernment), an interpretation of Shem-Tov ibn Falaquera's psychological treatise Sefer ha-nefesh ('Book of the Soul'), and a volume of poetry entitled Zera kodesh ('Seed of Holiness').

== Publications ==
- Ha-Matseref; ve-hu ha-ḥelek ha-rishon mi-sefer Masaʼat Mosheh. Lemberg: Gedruckt bei E. Winiarz. 1854.
