= Herman Bodek =

Galician Jewish Hebraist (1820–1880)

- צְבִי הִירְשׁ בּוֹדֵק
- Born: September 27, 1820; Brody, Galician Austrian Empire (now Ukraine)
- Died: August 19, 1880 (aged 59); Leipzig, Kingdom of Saxony, German Empire
- Occupations: Hebraist, translator, businessman
- Organization: Apollo Lodge (Leipzig)
- Known for: Author of Eleh dibre ha-berit, a Hebrew introduction to Freemasonry.
- Notable work: Eleh dibre ha-berit (1880)

Herman Bodek (Hebrew: צְבִי הִירְשׁ בּוֹדֵק, Tzvi Hirsh Bodek; 27 September 1820, Brody – 19 August 1880, Leipzig) was a Galician Jewish Hebraist. He was descended from a highly respected family, and was the son-in-law of Solomon Judah Loeb Rapoport. For a long time he lived in Leipzig, where he was translator of Hebrew at the courts of law, and was also engaged in business.

Bodek was well acquainted with rabbinical and Maskilic Hebrew literature, and contributed articles on various subjects to the Jewish periodical press of several countries. He was the author of Eleh dibre ha-berit (lit. 'These Are the Words of the Covenant'; Leipzig, 1880), a twelve-chapter introduction to the ritual signs, allegories, and objects of Freemasonry. It was based on the works of Oswald Marbach and Robert Fischer on that subject, and was intended mainly for Jewish Masons in the East, or for those in Europe who could not read any language other than Hebrew. Bodek was himself a member of the Apollo Lodge of the Masonic Order in Leipzig, which he joined in February 1861.
