= Shaarei Teshuva =

Shaarei Teshuva (lit. "Gates of Repentance") (Hebrew: שערי תשובה) may refer to a number of cases:

- An ethical work authored by Yonah Gerondi (Rabenu Yonah) and first published in 1505.
- A commentary on the Shulchan Aruch authored by Chaim Mordechai Margoliot.
- The High Holy Day Machzor published by the Central Conference of American Rabbis for the Reform Movement in North America.
- A collection of Geonic responsa published in 1802.
- A synagogue in the tunnels of the Western Wall.
