= Abraham Aberle =

Abraham (Rabel) Aberle (28 July 1811 – 9 March 1841) was a Moravian Hebrew poet, translator, and writer from Austerlitz. All his literary productions—poems, metrical translations, exegetical notes, and riddles—were published in the periodical Bikkure ha-'Ittim.
