= Solomon Pergamenter =

Solomon ben Shalom Pergamenter (Yiddish: שלמה בן שלום פערגאמענטער) was a 19th-century Austrian Hebrew writer and poet. He was the author of Yesode ha-Lashon (1813), in Yiddish, for self-instruction in Hebrew, and of several Hebrew poems. He edited the sixth volume of the Hebrew literary-scientific annual Bikkure ha-Ittim in 1825.
