= Lelio Della Torre =

Italian Jewish scholar and poet

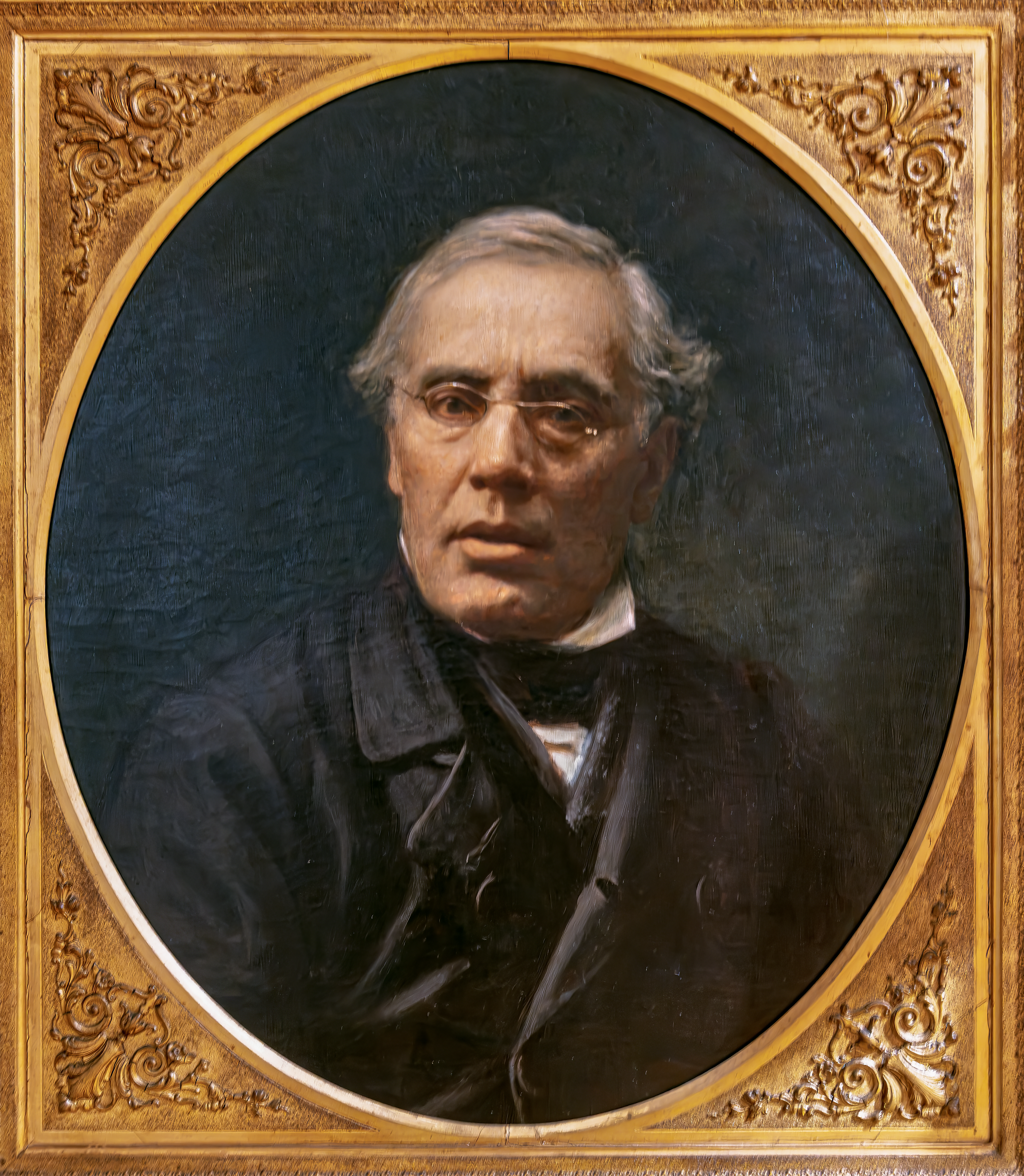
Lelio Della Torre

Lelio Hillel Della Torre (1805–1871) was an Italian Jewish scholar and poet writing in Italian, German, French and Hebrew, best known for his critical translation of the Book of Psalms (1845, 1854). He was the son of Solomon Jehiel Raphael ha-Kohen, chief rabbi of Cuneo, Piedmont. His father died in 1807, and Della Torre grew up as an orphan with his mother's family in Casale Monferrato, and after the death of his maternal grandfather in Asti, with his mother's brother, Sabbatai Elhanan Treves. His uncle moved to Turin in 1820, being named chief rabbi of the Jewish communities of Piemont. Della Torre studied Greek, Latin and Italian in Turin, from the age of sixteen working as a private tutor in order to support his mother and three sisters. From 1823, he was teacher for Hebrew philology and biblical exegesis at the Jewish Collegio Colonna e Finzi in Turin. In 1826 he was ordained as rabbi, acting as rabbi of the Turin community from 1827. In 1829, he was called to Padua as professor of Talmud, homiletics and pastoral theology at the newly established rabbinical seminar there, a position he held until his death. He did not serve as rabbi again except for a brief interval in 1869 following the death of the rabbi of Padua. He was married to Anna Bolaffio, with whom he had seven children.

== Bibliography ==
- 1821–1828 Hebräische und italienische Gedichte
- 1826, 1827 Hebräische Fabeln im biblischen Style
- 1828, Specchio ossia Tavola sinottica delle conjugazioni ebraiche
- 1830, 1831 Italienische Gedichte
- 1834 Cinque discorsi detti in Padova
- 1835 Discorso funebre letto nelle solenni esequie di S. M. l'Imperatore et Re Francesco I
- 1842 Della Condizione degli Ebrei sotto l'impero germanico nel medio ere
- 1843 Saggio di traduzione delle Ore del mattino di Mosè Mendelsohn
- 1852 Prose israelitiche
- 1852 Orazioni per ordinazioni rabbiniche
- 1845, 1854 I Salmi volgarizzati sul testo massoretico ed illustrati con argomenti e note (2 vols.)
- 1846 Preghiere degl’Israeliti secondo il rito tedesco
- 1863 Orazioni due per ordinazioni rabbiniche
- 1868 Tal Yaldut ("Dew of Youth", Hebrew poems)
- 1869 Eglei Ṭal ("Dewdrops", Hebrew poems)
- 1869 Poésies Hébraïques
- 1870 Iscrizioni Sepolcrali
- 1872 Pensieri sulle lezioni sabbatiche del Pentateuco
- 1878 Orazioni postume, with a short biography (pp. 189–202)

He also wrote various scholarly articles in Classical Hebrew in the journals Kerem Ḥemed, Bikkure ha-'Ittim, ,Oẓar Neḥmad and Kokebe Yiẓḥaḳ.

== Sources ==
- Salomon Wininger, Große Jüdische National-Biographie, vol. VI, 122f.
- Riccardo Di Segni: Della Torre, Lelio Hillel. In: Massimiliano Pavan (ed.): Dizionario Biografico degli Italiani (DBI) vol. 37 (1989).
