= Daniel Block =

German-American Jewish religious leader

Daniel Block (c. 1802 – 1853) was a Jewish leader who founded the B'nai B'rith synagogue in St. Louis, Missouri. He lived for only four years in the United States but he made important contributions on the culture of the St. Louis Jewish community to which he belonged. Between his arrival in about 1848, and his death in 1853, he contributed greatly to the organization and development of B'nai El congregation.

== Early life ==
Daniel Block was probably born in Bohemia in or around 1802 but no birth record has been located. In the 1850 United States City of St. Louis Census he stated his profession as butcher and his birthplace as Germany.

The 1850 census entry for his wife Sarah Wedeles and his children stated they were born in Germany. At this time the family lived in Ward 1 of the City of St. Louis, close to the Mississippi River and south of the Eads Bridge.

Later US census entries for his wife and children stated that they were born in Bohemia. Many Block family members went to St. Louis in the early 19th century from Bohemia, then a part of the Austrian Empire. Most came from Švihov, Klatovy District, in German Schwihau. This is a small town about 70 miles South West of Prague in the Klatovy region.

== Synagogue development ==
Daniel Block did have a well-known and documented involvement in the founding in 1849 of synagogue B'nai B'rith. His actions were described in some detail in Zion in the Valley. This congregation was known as the "Bohemian shul" as it was founded by German speaking Bohemian Jews who lived in the southern part of St. Louis.

Daniel Block was named as the "first parnass" and referred to as "the father of the B'nai B'rith Congregation." Many of the other founding members were listed in Daniel Block's 1853 will. This congregation came into existence because recently emigrating liberal Bohemian German Jews considered the preexisting United Hebrew congregation too intolerant in religious matters and too Polish in habits and mannerisms and too exacting in financial matters.

B'nai B'rith purchased a lot inside the city upon which it hoped to build a synagogue, but in October 1850, unable to pay the balance on the land, they returned it to the Benjamin Soulard estate. Shortly thereafter, when Isidor Bush became president, new efforts resulted in successfully acquiring another plot of land on Jackson Street. Bush then appealed for funds from the entire country by publishing in the Rabbi Isaac Leeser paper in Philadelphia an open letter asking for money for a building. This letter was signed by Bush as president, M. Taussig as vice-president and by Ludwig Schwartzkopf as secretary.

Rabbi Leeser traveled throughout the US seeking to unify the Jewish people. He spoke to more than a hundred people at United Hebrew temple on Fifth Street in St. Louis on December 14, 1851. He pointed out the absurdity of maintaining three separate congregations.

As a result of this activity B'nai B'rith merged with Emanu-El and United Hebrew to form B'nai-El. During 1852 Daniel served on several committees that assisted in the merger of B'nai B'rith and Emanu El that preceded the merger with United Hebrew. On October 17, 1852, a document was ratified that created B'nai El. Daniel was appointed a Temporary Director along with Bush. Daniel, along with Fred Wolff, F. L. Dattelzweig, L. R. Strauss, Bernard Singer and Julius Epstein were placed on a fund raising committee. Later he was made a permanent Director along with Isidor Bush, William Walter, Alexander Suess, Bernard Singer, Isaac Lowman and Ludwig Schwartzkopf.

In 1853 he convinced the Directors to reject leasing a lot and to go ahead and purchase land and build a completely new building. The congregation concluded a deal shortly after his death to purchase land at Sixth and Gratiot near Cerre. The first synagogue constructed in St. Louis, and first west of the Mississippi had its cornerstone laid at this site on April 16, 1855. Over four hundred people attended the ceremony

The first synagogue west of the Mississippi the B'nai El building in St. Louis

== Friends and family ==
His first son-in-law was Louis Schwarzkopf, probably from Susice Bohemia, also a part of the founding group at B'nai-B'rith. Louis is mentioned in Zion in the Valley as the chazzan from 1852 to 1857. Louis died at age 38 on December 18, 1863, leaving Daniel's daughter Dora a widow with four small children. Louis may be related to Abraham Schwarzkopf who was married to an earlier time period Block family member, Esther, sister of Eliezer S. Block and of Ellen Block who married Joseph Kohn.

Daniel Block died on September 3, 1853, and was buried in New Mount Sinai Cemetery (old section), St. Louis. He was the first person to be buried within this newly formed cemetery and is so noted on the web site introduction to the cemetery. His tombstone is a replacement donated by his children

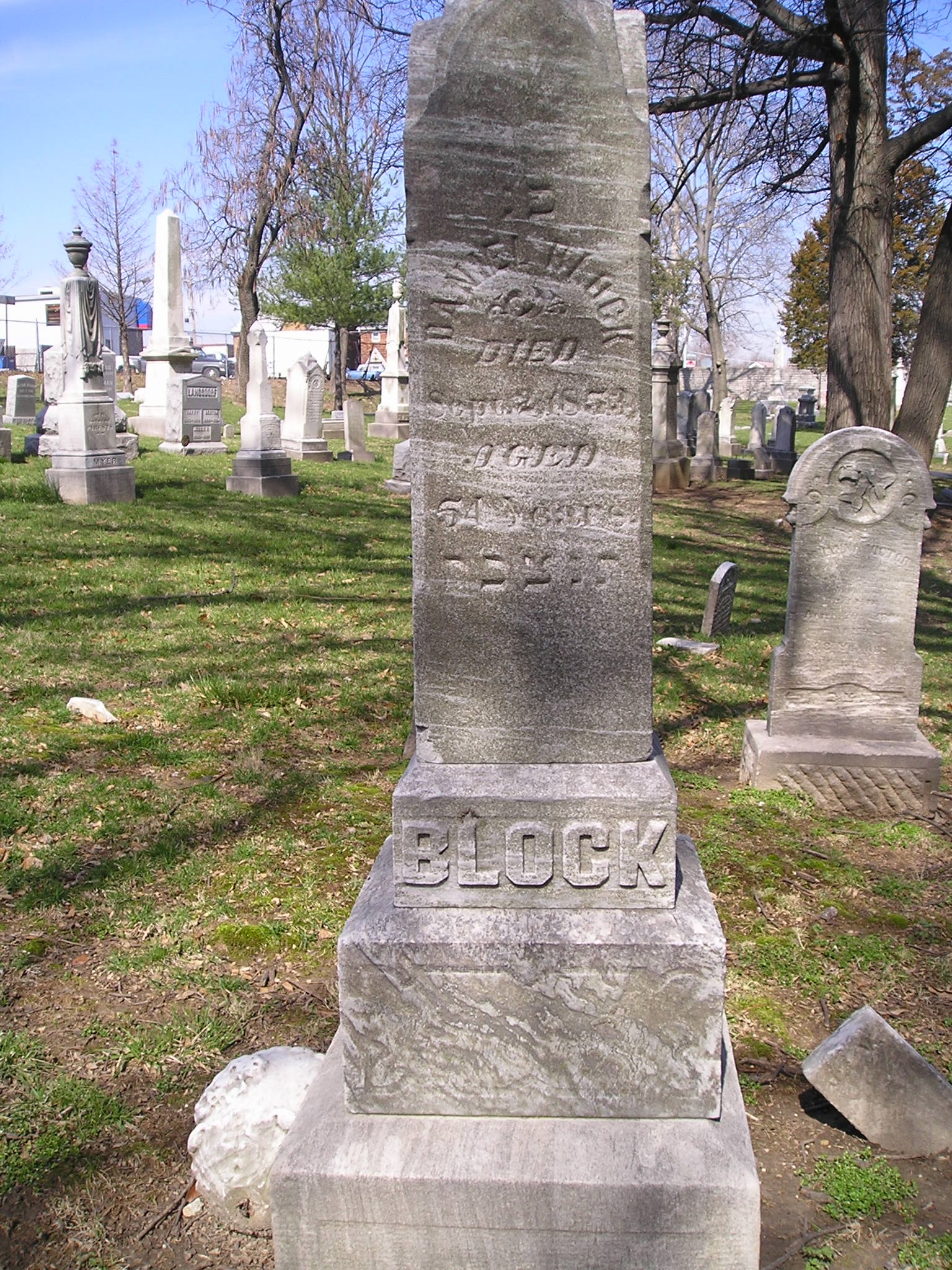
Daniel Block Tombstone Mt. Sinai Cemetery St. Louis Missouri.

Daniel Block's children were Heinrich, Jacob, Dora (born as Veronika), and Abraham.
