= Joachim Pollak =

Czech rabbi

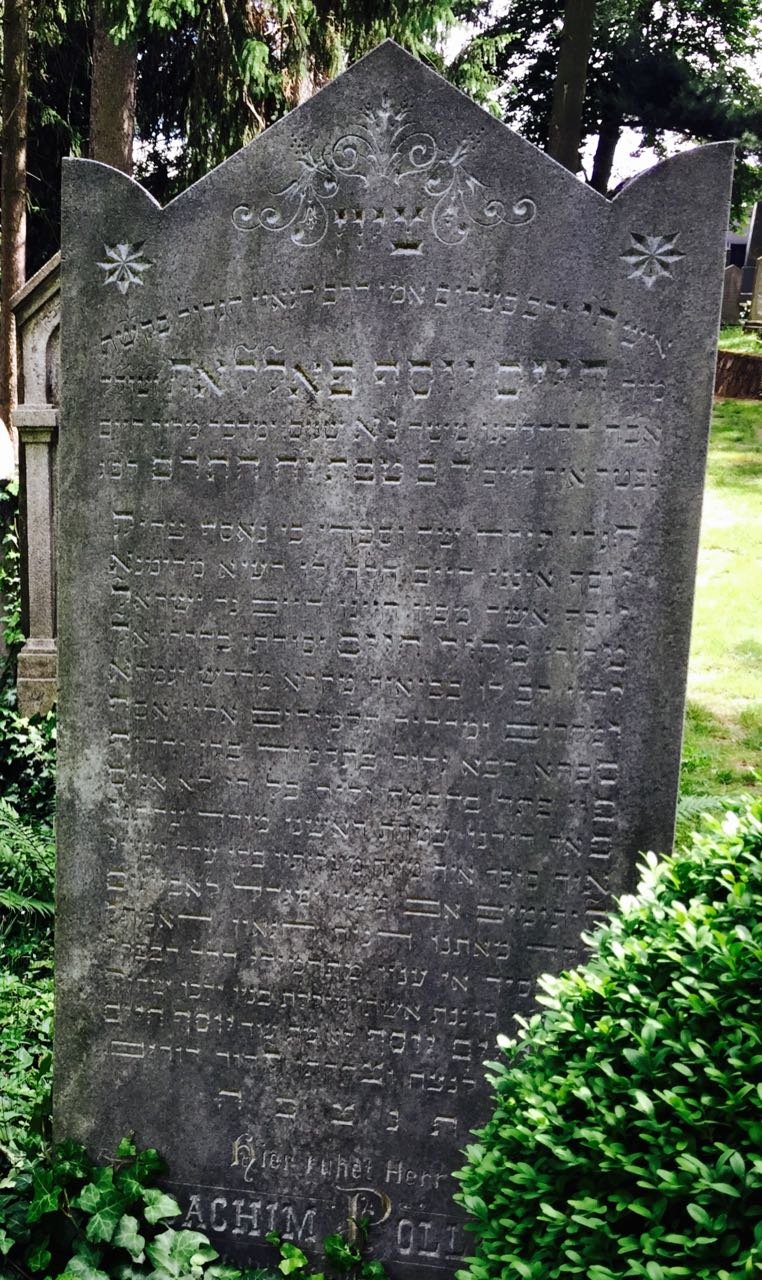
The kever of rabbi Hayyim Joseph Pollak at the Jewish Cemetery in Třebíč.

Joachim (Hayyim Joseph) Pollak (1798 – 16 December 1879) was an Austrian rabbi, born in Hungary, who officiated at Trebitsch, Moravia from 1828 until his death. He wrote a commentary, entitled Meḳor Ḥayyim (Presburg, 1849; 3d ed. Warsaw, 1885), on R. Isaac Arama's philosophical work Aḳedat Yiẓḥaḳ, and a biography of the same scholar. Pollak was also the author of a number of Hebrew songs in the annual Bikkure ha-'Ittim, and of a scholarly essay on the Talmudic rules of the יש אם למקרא in Stern's Kebuẓat Ḥakamim, besides being a regular contributor to many Hebrew periodicals. He died at Trebitsch, Moravia.

== Jewish Encyclopedia bibliography ==
- Fuenn, Keneset Yisrael, p. 366;
- Fürst, Bibl. Jud. iii. 111;
- Neuzeit, 1879, pp. 402–412;
- Ha-Maggid, 1880, p. 21;
- Zeitlin, Ḳiryat Sefer, ii. 277
