= Hayyim Mordecai Margolioth =

Polish rabbi

Hayyim Mordecai Margolioth (mid-18th century – 1818; Hebrew: חיים מרדכי מרגליות) was a Polish rabbi, best known as the author of the halachic work Sha'are Teshuvah.

He studied under his uncle Sender Margolioth; and is the brother of Ephraim Solomon Margolioth. He was at first Rabbi at Brestitzki, and later became Rabbi in Greater Dubno, where he established a printing press. He was among those who elected the three deputies sent to St. Petersburg to confer with the government upon Jewish affairs. He died at Dunajowce in 1818.

Sha'are Teshuvah (שערי תשובה, Entry to Responsa), is a commentary to the Orach Chaim section of Shulchan Aruch and is published in most editions of the Shulchan Aruch. It contains extracts from other works – functioning as a digest of material from the responsa literature – along with the author's own insights. It was completed posthumously by his brother.
