= Max Letteris =

Austrian scholar (1800–1871)

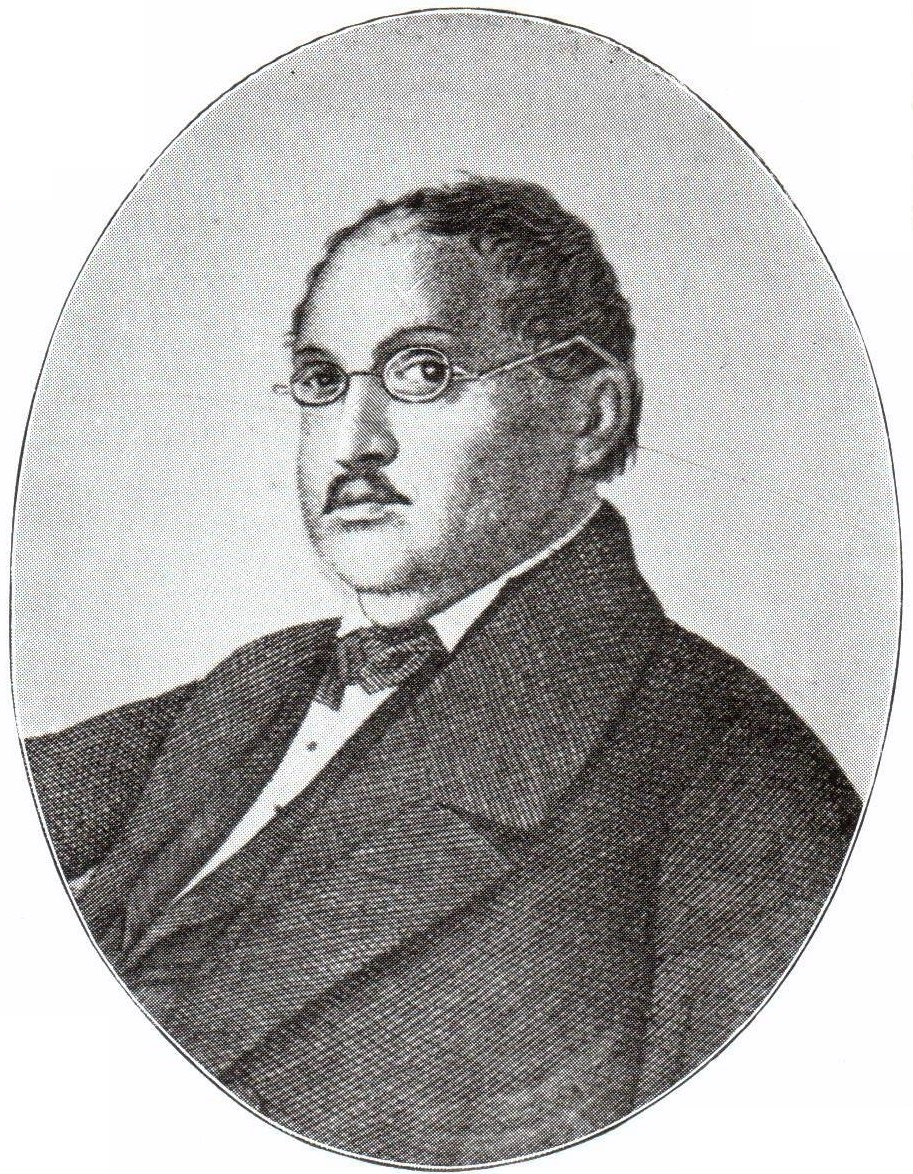
- Born: Meïr Halevi Letteris; 13 September 1800; Zolkiev, Galicia, Habsburg Empire
- Died: 19 May 1871 (aged 70); Vienna, Austria-Hungary
- Writing career
- Language: Hebrew, German
- Literary movement: Haskala

Meïr Halevi (Max) Letteris (Yiddish: מאיר הלוי לעטעריס; 13 September 1800 – 19 May 1871) was an Austrian poet, editor, and translator of the Galician Haskala. He translated into Hebrew works by Virgil, Lucian, Jean Racine, Lord Byron, Johann Wolfgang von Goethe, Friedrich Schiller, Ludwig August von Frankl, and others.

== Biography ==
Letteris was born in Zolkiev into a family of printers that came to Galicia from Amsterdam under John III Sobieski. His father Gershon also served as head of the town's Jewish community. At the age of twelve he sent a Hebrew poem to Nachman Krochmal, who was then living at Zolkiev. Subsequently, he made the acquaintance of Krochmal, who encouraged him in his study of German, French, and Latin literature.

In 1826, he entered the University of Lemberg, where for four years he studied philosophy and Oriental languages. In 1831, he went to Berlin as Hebrew corrector in a printing establishment, and later in a similar capacity to Presburg, where he edited a large number of valuable manuscripts, and to Prague, where he received the degree of Ph.D. (1844). In 1848 he settled finally in Vienna.

== Work ==
Letteris' chief poetical work in German, Sagen aus dem Orient ('Legends of the Orient', Karlsruhe, 1847), consisting of poetic renderings of Talmudic and other legends, secured for him a gold medal from Emperor Franz Joseph and, though for a short time, the post of librarian in the Oriental department of the Vienna Imperial Library.

He exerted a considerable influence on Hebrew poetry. His reputation as the foremost poet of the Galician school is based on his volume of poems Tofes kinnor ve-'ugav ('Master of the Lyre and the Cithern', Vienna, 1860), and especially on his Hebrew version of Faust, entitled Ben Abuya (Vienna, 1865). In this work, Faust is replaced by the Jewish heretic Elisha ben Abuyah. (For the infidelity of his "translation" to Goethe's original, Letteris was the object of a blistering attack by the young Peretz Smolenskin.) One of his best known poems is his Zionist song Yonah Ḥomiyyah ('The Lamenting Dove'), became very popular.

He was the editor of Wiener Vierteljahrsschrift, with a Hebrew supplement, Abne Nezer (Vienna, 1853), and of Wiener Monatsblätter für Kunst und Litteratur (Vienna, 1853).

=== The Letteris Bible ===
The Letteris Bible, title page, from a scan of the 1896 reprint by the original publisher.

In 1852, during a period in which he faced financial difficulties, he agreed to edit an edition of the Masoretic Text of the Hebrew Bible. In 1866 he produced a revised edition for a Christian missionary organization, the British and Foreign Bible Society. This revision was checked against old manuscripts and early printed editions. Its typeface is highly legible and it is printed in a clear single-column format per page. It is probably the most widely reproduced text of the Hebrew Bible in history, with many dozens of authorised reprints and many more pirated and unacknowledged ones.

This revised edition became very popular, and was widely reprinted in both Jewish circles (often accompanied by a translation on facing pages) and in Christian circles (with the addition of the New Testament).

== Partial bibliography ==
- Divre shir [Collection of Poems]. Zolkiev: G. Letteris. 1822.
- Ayelet ha-shaḥar [Morning Star]. Zolkiev. 1824.
- Ha-tzefirah. Zolkiev and Leipzig. 1823. A selection of poems and essays.
- Palge mayim. Lemberg. 1827. Poems.
- Gedichte. Vienna. 1829. German translations from the Hebrew.
- Gezaʻ Yishai. Vienna: Anton Edler von Schmid. 1835. hdl:2027/hvd.hwmnj1. Hebrew translation of Racine's Athalie.
- Shelom Ester. Prague: Wolf Pascheles. 1843. hdl:2027/hvd.hwms5s. Hebrew translation of Racine's Esther.
- Sagen aus dem Orient [Legends of the Orient]. Karlsruhe: Macklot. 1847. hdl:2027/hvd.32044089108377.
- Spinoza's Lehre und Leben. Vienna. 1847.
- Neginot Yisrael. Vienna. 1856. Hebrew rendering of Frankel's Nach der Zerstreuung.
- Tofes kinnor ve-ʻugav [Master of the Lyre and the Cithern]. Vienna: Anstalt. 1860. hdl:2027/hvd.hwn7pq.
- Ben Abuya. Vienna. 1865.
- Zikaron ba-sefer [Memoir in a Book] (autobiography). Vienna. 1869.
- Bilder aus dem Biblischen Morgenlande. Leipzig. 1870.
