= David Samoscz =

German author

- Born: 29 December 1789; Kempen, Province of Posen
- Died: 29 April 1864 (aged 74); Breslau, Prussia
- Writing career
- Language: Hebrew
- Genres: Children's literature, occasional poetry
- Literary movement: Haskalah

David ben Joseph Samoscz (Yiddish: דוד בן יוסף זאַמושׁטשׁ; 29 December 1789 – 29 April 1864) was a German author of Hebrew children's literature.

Born in Kempen, Province of Posen, he went at an early age to Breslau, where he was a tutor and private teacher until 1822, when he entered business. Having met with reverses he toward the end of his life devoted himself again to literature. He was a prolific author of stories for the young, written in Hebrew and adapted mainly from the German, and of textbooks of instruction in the Jewish religion.

== Work ==
Samoscz contributed Hebrew poems to periodicals, such as Bikkure ha-Ittim, and to the works of his Breslau friends, M. B. Friedenthal, Jacob Raphael Fürstenthal, and others. His other works include the following:

- Ger tzedek. Breslau. 1816. History of the conversion of Joseph Steblitzki, written in German with Hebrew characters.
- He-ḥarutz vehe-atzel. Breslau: Löb Sulzbach. 1817.
- Pillegesh ve-Gibeah, ein Biblisches Drama. Breslau. 1818.
- Tokeḥot musar. Sittenbüchlein in für Kinder. Breslau: H. Sulzbach. 1819.
- Teshuva le-mevakeer. Breslau: L. W. Sulzbach. 1821. Reply to a critique by J. H. Miro.
- Resise ha-melitzah. Dyhernfurth: Löb Sulzbach. 1822.
- Mafteaḥ beit David. Breslau: Löb Sulzbach. 1823.
- Metzi'at Amerika. Breslau. 1824. On the discovery of America, after Campe.
- Robinson der Jüngere (in Hebrew). Breslau: Löb Sulzbach. 1824. Also after Campe.
- Aguddat shoshannim, Hebräische Gedichtsammlung. Breslau: Löbel Sulzbach und Sohn. 1825.
- Halikot 'olam, ein Sittendrama. Breslau. 1829.
- Esh dat / Ohel David / Shire David. Breslau: Löbel Sulzbach und Sohn. 1834. Textbook of Hebrew instruction in three parts.
- Rigshat nafshi. Breslau. 1835. Poem in honor of the visit of King Frederick William III to Breslau.
- Nahar me-Eden. Breslau: Löb Sulzbach. 1836. Based on Johann Hübner's Christian Bible for children.
- Kol nehi. Breslau. 1840. Elegy on the death of Frederick William III.
- Kol anot simḥa. Löb Sulzbach. 1841.
- Re'ot Midian; o, yaldut Moshe (in Hebrew). Breslau: Hirsch Sulzbach. 1843.
- Le-ḥanukkat beit ha-tefilla. Hebräische Gesänge zu der Montag den 10. September 1855 stattfindenden Einweihungsfeier des neuen israelitischen Tempels in Leipzig (in Hebrew and German). Leipzig. 1855.
