= Salomon Jacob Cohen =

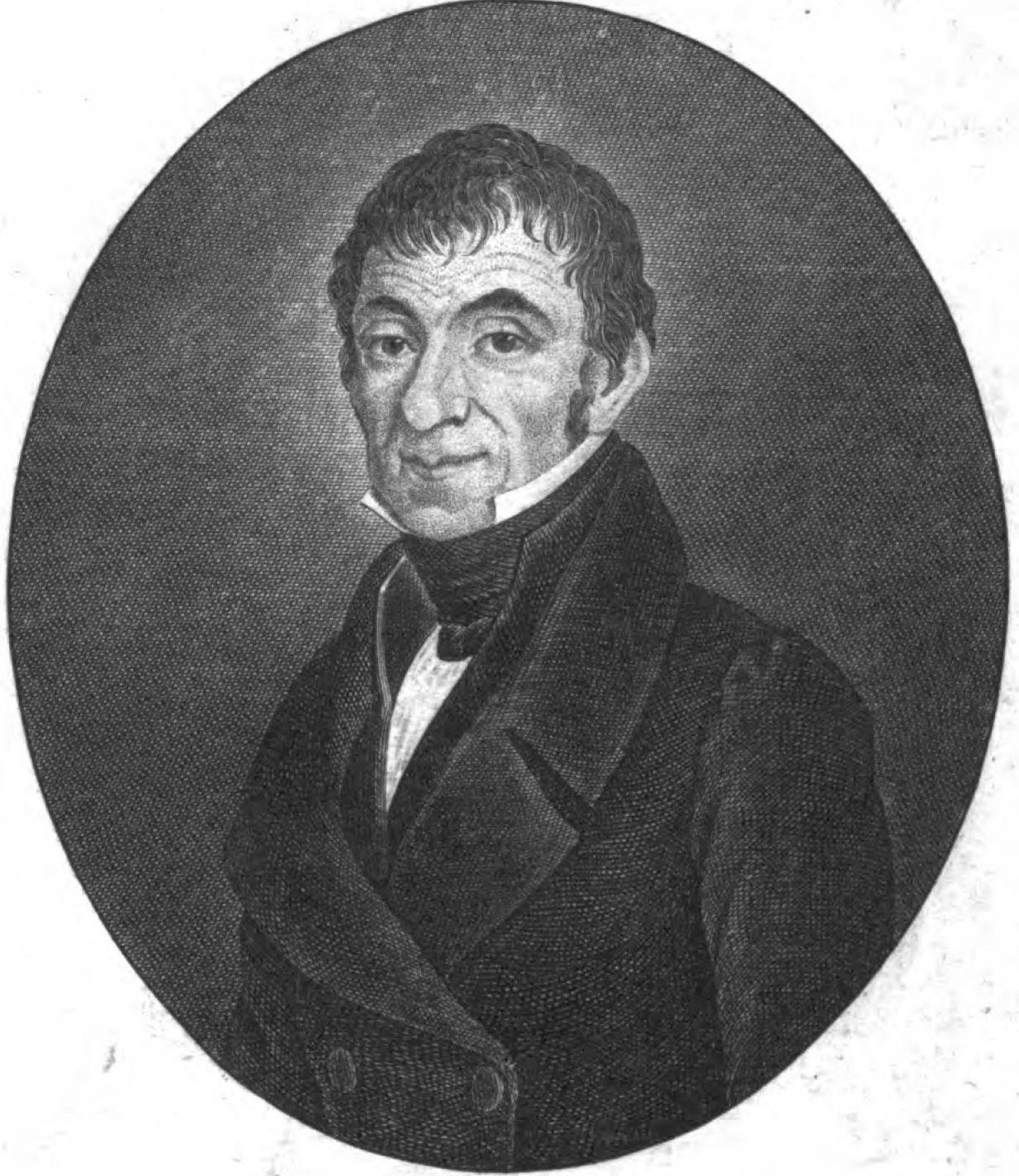
- Salomon Jacob Cohen, bookplate from his collection of poetry, Nir David, Vienna, 1834.
- Born: 23 December 1771; Międzyrzecz
- Died: 20 February 1845 (aged 73); Hamburg

Salomon Jacob Cohen (Hebrew: שלום הכהן; 23 December 1771 - 20 February 1845) was a German Jewish Hebrew scholar, teacher, writer and translator of the Bible. He was an important representative of the Haskalah in Berlin, Hamburg and Vienna.

== Life ==
Cohen was born in Międzyrzecz (Greater Poland), which after the Second Partition of Poland became administered as part of South Prussia. As a teenager, he went to Berlin, where he studied with Naphtali Hirz Wessely and developed an appreciation of Hebrew poetry. He was soon regarded as an outstanding stylist of Hebrew. From 1800 to 1808, he taught Hebrew and religion at the Jewish Free School in Berlin, founded by David Friedländer. In 1808, he founded the Society of Friends of the Hebrew Language (Gesellschaft der Freunde der hebräischen Sprache). From 1809 to 1811, he was the last editor of the first Hebrew literary journal Ha-Meassef, which he tried unsuccessfully to revive. Cohen also lived in Altona, Hamburg, Dessau, and London before settling in Hamburg. In 1820, he went to Vienna, where he founded the first Hebrew journal in Austria, the literary magazine Bikkurej ha-ittim ("First Fruits of the Times"). In 1810, he translated the biblical book of Jeremiah into German; and from 1824 to 1827, he completed a German edition of the Old Testament in Hamburg. He died in Hamburg.

== Selected works ==
- Mishle Agur. Berlin 1799 (Collection of stories, with German translation).
- Torat Leschon Ivrit - Hebräische Sprachlehre. Three volumes, Berlin 1802.
- Morgenländische Pflanzen auf nördlichem Boden. Eine Sammlung neuer Hebräischer Poesien nebst deutscher Uebersetzung. Frankfurt a. M. 1807 Digitalisat.
- Katechismus der israelitischen Religion. Zum ersten Unterricht für Israelitische Knaben und Mädchen. Hamburg 1812 (also translated into Danish).
- Amal-ve-Thuerza. Rödelheim 1812 (Drama).
- Schorsche Emunah. London 1815 (Handbook of Judaism; English translation by Dr. Josua van Oven).
- Masa Batawi. Amsterdam 1814 (Dutch epic; Dutch translation by H. Somerhausen).
- Ketaw Joscher. Wien 1820 (Collection of Hebrew and German letters).
- Die heilige Schrift. mit möglichster Correctheit des hebräischen Textes. Nebst verbesserter deutscher Uebersetzung. Hamburg 1824/27.
- Ner Dawid. Wien 1834 (Poem) Digitalisat.
- Kore ha-Dorot. Wilna 1837 (Jewish story).
