= Max Emanuel Stern =

Hungarian-born Hebraist, writer, poet, and translator

- Mendel b'ri Stern
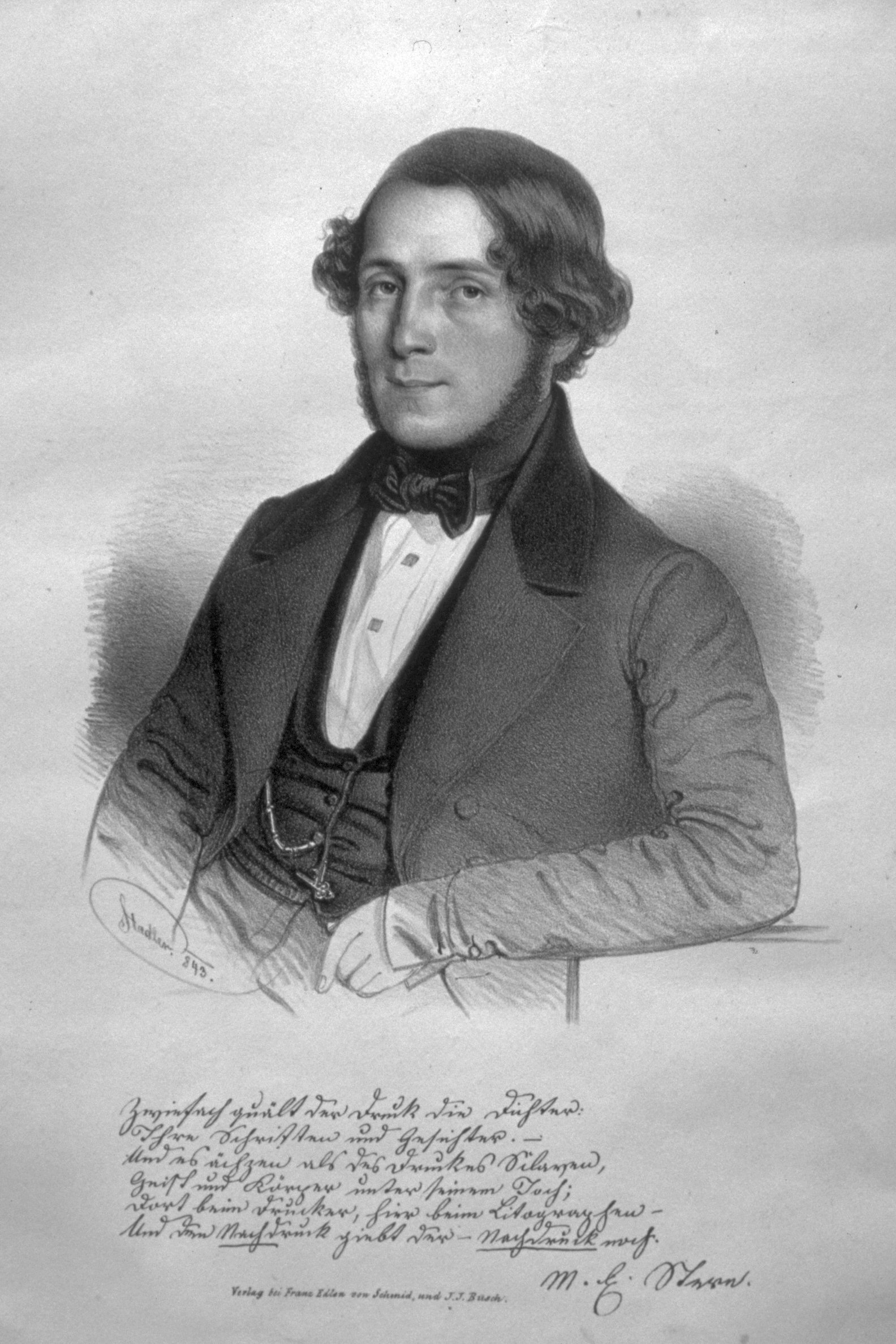
- Lithograph of Stern by Johann Stadler
- Born: Menaḥem Mendel Stern; 9 November 1811; Presburg, Kingdom of Hungary
- Died: 9 February 1873 (aged 61); Vienna, Austria-Hungary
- Resting place: Währing Jewish Cemetery, Vienna
- Writing career
- Pen name: Ernst, M. E. Ernst
- Language: Hebrew, German, Yiddish

Max Emanuel Stern (9 November 1811 – 9 February 1873), also known as Mendel b'ri Stern (Yiddish: מענדל בר״י שטערן), was a Hungarian-born Hebraist, writer, poet, and translator.

== Biography ==
Born to Jewish parents in Presburg in 1811, Stern first studied under his father Isak, who was a teacher at the local Jewish primary school. When his father became blind, Max, then only fourteen years of age, took charge of his classes, devoting his nights to further study and to writing his Dichtungen, his Maslul, and his Perlenblumen, the latter being metrical translations of the Proverbs. His poems first appeared in print in 1827. Stern held the teaching position for nine years, resigning upon his father's death in late 1832.

The following year he accepted the position of literary advisor and proofreader for Anton Edler von Schmid's printing press at Vienna. He was appointed principal of the Hebrew-German school at Eisenstadt in 1835, where he wrote his epic Tif'ereth ha-Tishbi, a biography of the prophet Elijah in two parts. In 1838, after having taught for half a year at Triesch, he returned to Vienna, where he prepared his epic for the press, publishing it under the pseudonym of "M. I. Ernst" (Leipzig, 1840). He meanwhile became known to wider circles through translations of prayers and philosophical writings.

Stern began in 1845 to publish his Hebrew periodical Kokhve Yitzḥak ('Stars of Isaac'; 36 volumes, 1845–69), which included poetry, prose, scholarly articles, and translations, and was twice subsidized by the Imperial Academy of Science at Vienna. Later he received from the Emperor of Austria the Imperial and Royal Austrian Gold Medal for Science and Art and the Order of Franz Joseph, and was made an honorary member of the Deutsche Morgenländische Gesellschaft.

In the last years of his life, he made his living from the production of Hebrew funerary writings and occasional poems.

== Bibliography ==
- Dichtungen. Pest: Ludwig Landerer. 1827.
- Perlenblumen. Presburg: Schnisek. 1832. Rhymed metrical translation of the Proverbs.
- Maslul leshon ʻEver. Vienna: Anton Edler von Schmid. 1832. Grammar of the Hebrew language.
- König Sauls Glück und Ende. Biblisch-dramatisches Gedicht in vier Abtheilungen. Presburg: Schnisek. 1833.
- Sefer Mishle. Presburg: Anton Edler von Schmid. 1833. Interlinear translation of the Proverbs.
- Seder kinot le-Tishʻah be-Av. Vienna: Anton Edler von Schmid. 1837. Translation of Lamentations, Zionides, and kinnot.
- Tifʼeret ha-Tishbi. Vienna: Edler von Schmid. 1839. hdl:2027/uc1.$b699432. Epic poem in eight cantos.
- Shire ha-yiḥud. Vienna: Franz Edler von Schmid & J. J. Busch. 1840. Translation of the Hymn of Unity.
- Evel Moshe. Vienna. 1840. Elegy on the death of Moses Sofer.
- Stern, Max Emanuel (1840). Perlen des Orientes und Kernsprüche der Väter. Vienna. Rhymed metrical translation of Pirkei Avot.
- Zeitstimmen der Dreiuneinigkeit an die Zionswächter im Judenthum. Leipzig: Heinrich Franke. 1841.
- Klänge aus der Vorzeit. Sagen-Dichtungen. Vienna: Franz Edler von Schmid & J. J. Busch. 1841. hdl:2027/njp.32101076398989.
- Seder seliḥot. Vienna: Franz Edler von Schmid & J. J. Busch. 1841. Translation of Selichot.
- Yeḥezkel meturgam u-mevo'ar. Vienna. 1842. Translation of Ezekiel.
- Die fromme Zionstochter. Vienna. 1842.
- Dichtungsblüthen. Gesammelt aus der Mappe jugendlicher Erstlingsversuche. Vienna: Franz Edler von Schmid & J. J. Busch. 1843.
- Toldot Israel. Vienna. 1843.
- Die Weisheits-Sprüche Josua's des Sohnes Sirach, in metrisch gereimter Uebersetzung. Vienna: Franz Edler von Schmid und J. J. Busch. 1844.
- Maḥzor le-kol moʻade ha-shanah. Vienna: Franz Edler von Schmid & J. J. Busch. 1844.
- Bikkure ha-'ittim. Vienna. 1844.
- Raḥel. Vienna: Franz Edler von Schmid & J. J. Busch. 1844. Hebrew translation of Ludwig August Frankl's Rachel.
- Ha-shenah ha-nimkeret. Vienna. 1847. Hebrew translation of M. G. Saphir's Der verkaufte Schlaf.
- "Bechinoth Olam". Betrachtungen über das Weltenleben von Jedajah Penini Bedarschi. Vienna: Franz Edler von Schmid & J. J. Busch. 1847. Translation of Jedaiah ben Abraham Bedersi's Beḥinat ha-'Olam.
- "Mosdoth Emunah". Handbuch des jüdischen Religionsunterrichtes für die zartere Jugend. Pest: M. Löwy. 1851.
- Ḥokhmat Shlomo. Prague: Wolf Pascheles. 1853. hdl:2027/uc1.g0001609387. Translation of the Book of Wisdom from Naphtali Hirz Wessely's Hebrew.
- "Choboth ha-l'baboth". Lehrbuch der Herzenspflichten nach R. Bechaji ben Joseph zur Veredlung der relig, oder sittl. Denk- und Handlungsweise. Schmidbauer & Holzwarth. 1853. Translation of Baḥya ibn Pakuda's Ḥovot ha-levavot.
- Seder ha-hagadah le-leil shimurim. Vienna: Adalbert della Torre. 1854. Rhymed metrical translation of the Haggadah.
- Yehuda al-Ḥarizi (1854). Taḥkemoni. Vienna: Schmidbauer & Holzwarth.
- Die Rabbinerwahl in Bummeßl. Ein jüdisches Zeitbild. Vienna: Ulrich Klopf & Alexander Eurich. 1856. Satire on the choice of rabbi for Vienna after the death of Manheimer.
- Einer Lüge Folgen. Dramatisches Gedicht in fünf Acten. Leipzig: Wolfgang Gerhard. 1858. hdl:2027/hvd.hny85u.
- Kol ʿanot teruʿah! / Sängergruß zur Tempelweihe. Vienna. 1858. Poem in Hebrew and German on the opening of a Temple by Franz Joseph I.
- Yerushalma!. Vienna: I. Knöpflmacher. 1860. Translation of Ludwig August Frankl's Nach Jerusalem.
- Zur Alexander-Sage. Vienna: Philipp Bendiner. 1861. German translation of Ḥananya ben Yitzḥak's Musre ha-filosofim.
- Otzar ha-milin. Vienna: Jacob Schloßberg. 1863. Dictionary of Aramaic words found in the Talmud.
- Sefer keter Torah. Vienna: Jacob Schloßberg. 1864. Poetic description of the 613 commandments.
- Tofet und Eden; oder, die divina commedia des Immanuel ben Salomo aus Rom. Vienna: Herzfeld & Bauer. 1865. Translation of Immanuel the Roman's Ha-Tofet veha-Eden.
- "Ozar Sefath Kodesch". Vollständiges kurzgefaßtes Wörterbuch der hebräischen Sprache mit Angabe aller in der heiligen Schrift gebräuchlichen Conjugationen. Zum Gebrauche für Schulen und Laien. Vienna: Josef Holzwarth. 1871. Hebrew-German dictionary.
