= Ephraim Zalman Margolioth =

Galician rabbi from Brody (1762–1828)

Ephraim Zalman Margulies (sometimes transcribed as Margolis) (19 December 1762 – 24 August 1828) (Hebrew: אפרים זלמן בן מנחם מאניש מרגליות) was a Galician rabbi born in Brody, brother of Chaim Mordechai Margulies.

== Biography ==
He received his Talmudic education at different yeshivas, in which he distinguished himself for the acuteness of his intellect and for his astonishing memory. His correspondence with Ezekiel Landau and other leading Talmudists soon gained for him a high reputation. He established a banking-house which proved so successful that within a short time he became quite wealthy. In 1785 he published his responsa entitled Bet Hadash ha-Hadashot, and in the following year the rabbis of Brody elected him one of their number. Being of independent means, he opened in his house a yeshivah of which he was the head; several of his pupils became eminent rabbis.

== Works ==
Margolis was considered a high rabbinical authority. He published the following works:

- Bet Efrayim (2 vols., Lemberg, 1809–10), commentary on parts of the Shulchan Arukh, Yoreh De'ah
- Oration at the funeral of Rabbi Meir Kristianopoler (ib. 1815)
- Bet Efrayim (4 parts, ib. 1818), responsa on the four parts of the Shulchan 'Arukh
- Yad Efrayim (Dubno, 1820), commentaries on Shulchan Arukh, Orach Chayim
- Sha'are Efrayim (ib. 1820), on the rules pertaining to the reading of the Law
- Yad Efrayim (Zolkiev, 1823), extensive commentaries on the names of men and of women to be employed in letters of divorce
- Shem Efrayim (Berdychev, 1826), commentary on the Torah
- Matteh Efrayim (Zolkiev, 1834), on the ritual laws to be observed from the beginning of the month of Elul until after the Feast of Tabernacles, as well as on the regulations regarding the Kaddish of orphans
- Zera' Efrayim (Lemberg, 1853), commentary on the Pesikta Rabbati
- Safah Ne’emanah (Budapest, 1929), responsum on whether it is permitted to pray in the vernacular

Many other works by him are still in manuscript (as of 1906).
