= Judah Leib Ben-Ze'ev =

Galician Jewish scholar (1764–1811)

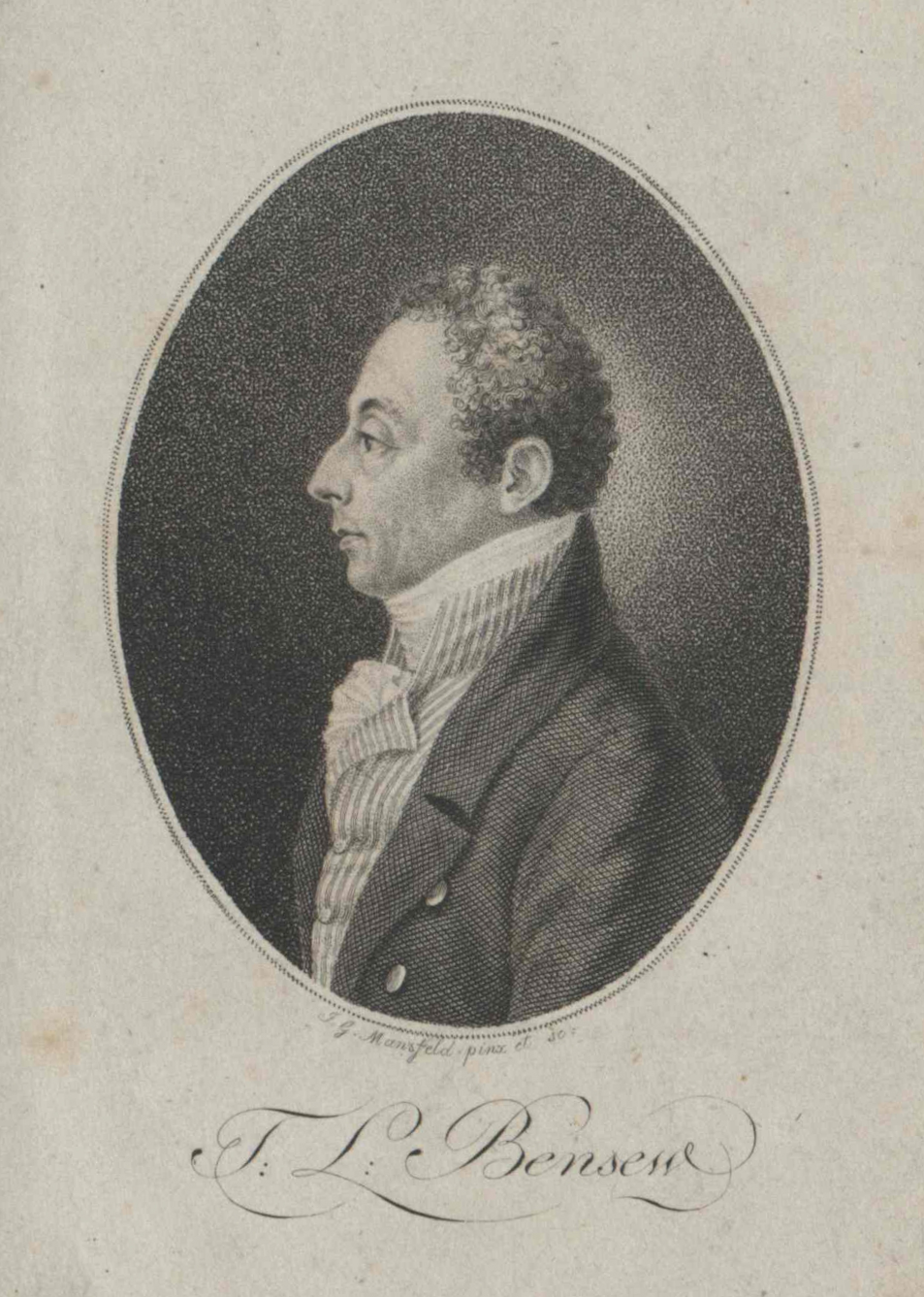
- Born: 18 August 1764; Lelov, Krakow Voivodeship, Polish–Lithuanian Commonwealth
- Died: 12 March 1811 (aged 46); Vienna, Austrian Empire
- Writing career
- Pen name: Y. L. K., Yehuda Leib Krakow
- Language: Hebrew
- Literary movement: Haskalah

Judah Leib Ben-Ze'ev (Hebrew: יְהוּדָה לֵיבּ בֵּן־זְאֵב, German: Juda Löb Bensew; 18 August 1764 – 12 March 1811) was a Galician Jewish philologist, lexicographer, and Biblical scholar. He was a member of the Me'assefim group of Hebrew writers, and a "forceful proponent of revitalizing the Hebrew language".

== Biography ==
Judah Leib Ben-Ze'ev was born in the Galician town of Lelów and received a traditional Jewish education. He was married off at the age of 13 and settled in the home of his wife's parents in Kraków, where he spent his days studying Talmud and his nights clandestinely acquiring the knowledge of Hebrew philology and secular subjects. In 1787, he moved to Berlin, then the centre of the Haskalah. There, he supported himself by teaching Hebrew and began publishing poems and parables in the Hebrew press. Ben-Ze'ev became friends with the Me'assefim and contributed to their journal poems and fables signed "Y. L. K." (Yehuda Leib Krakow).

In 1790, Ben-Ze'ev took up residence in Breslau (now Wrocław), where he wrote and published his Hebrew grammar, Talmud lashon ʻIvri, in 1796. Two years later, he published his Hebrew translation from Syriac of the apocryphal Book of Sirach, called by Franz Delitzsch a "masterpiece of imitation of Biblical gnomic style", followed by a translation from the Koine Greek of the Book of Judith. Ben-Ze'ev returned from Breslau to Kraków and in 1799 legally divorced his wife, with whom he had one daughter. He settled in Vienna as a proofreader in the Hebrew presses of Joseph Hraszansky and Anton Edler von Schmid and remained there till his death.

== Work ==
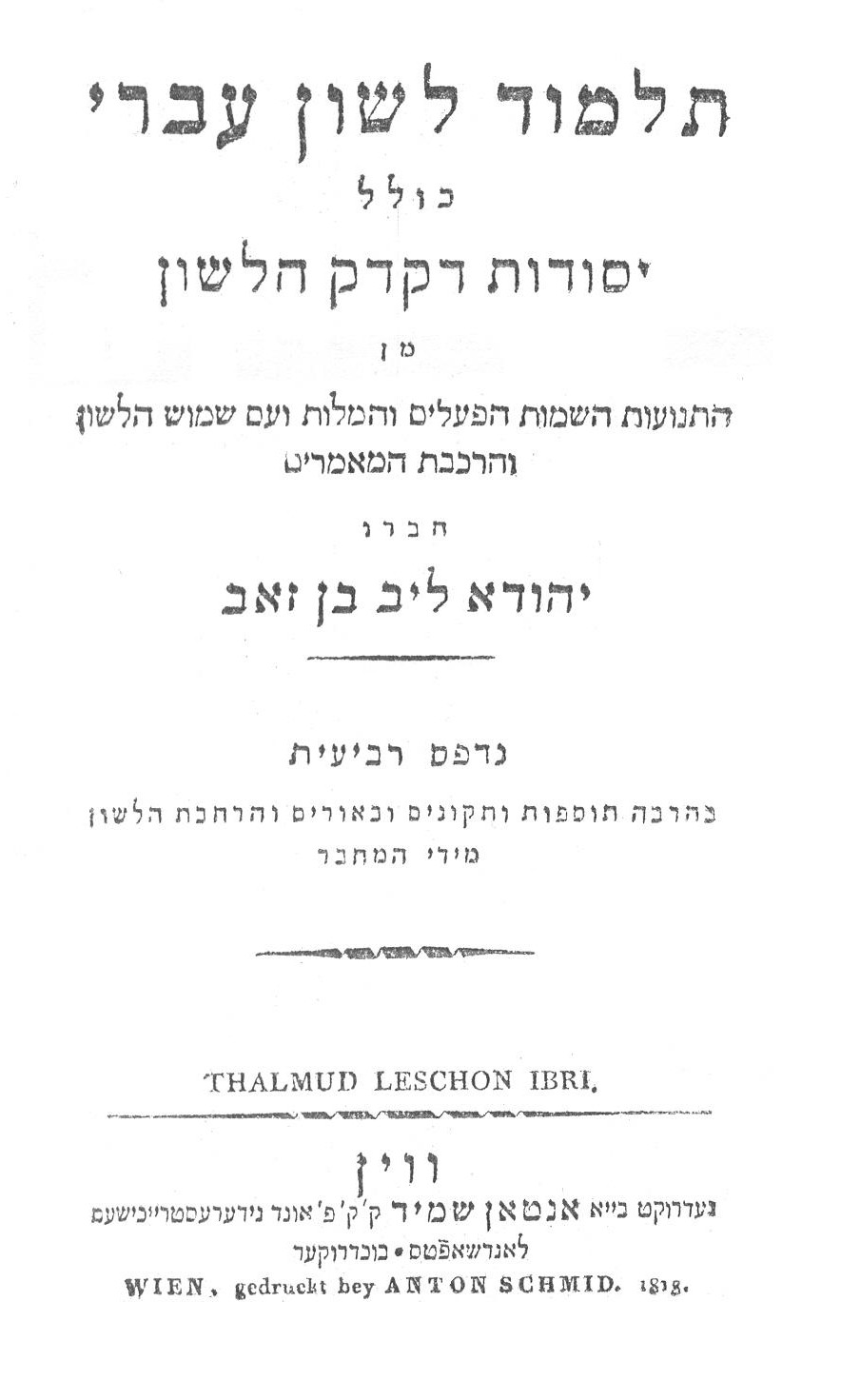
Title page of Ben-Ze'ev's Talmud lashon ʻIvri

=== Prose ===
Ben-Ze'ev is considered the first to systematize, in the Hebrew language itself, Hebrew grammar, to arrange it methodically and to introduce logic, syntax, and prosody as part of grammatical studies. His grammar Talmud lashon ʻIvri served as the main source for the study of Hebrew in Eastern Europe for a hundred years. The work is divided into five parts, each prefaced with a poem in praise of the Hebrew language, and includes a ma'amar on the difference between thought and speech. It was republished with additions, annotations, and commentaries no less than twenty times. Most notable is the Vilna edition of 1874, with the commentary "Yitron le-Adam" by Avraham Ber Lebensohn. The first part of a German revision of his Talmud by Salomon Jacob Cohen appeared in Berlin in 1802, and three parts in Dessau in 1807.

His second-most popular work was the Otzar ha-shorashim, a lexicon of Hebrew roots and Hebrew-German dictionary, inspired by the work of David Kimḥi. First published in Vienna between 1806 and 1808, the book went through six editions up to 1880. Ben-Ze'ev's Mesillat ha-limmud, a grammatical work for school-age children, was translated into Italian by Leon Romani (Vienna, 1825) and into Russian by Abraham Jacob Paperna (Warsaw, 1871).

Ben-Ze'ev released new editions and commentaries to the Saadia Gaon's The Book of Beliefs and Opinions (Berlin, 1789) and Yedidya ha-Penini's Beḥinat ha-'Olam (1789). His last major work was Mavo el mikraʼe kodesh (Vienna, 1810), an anthology of historical-critical introductions to each of the books of the Prophets and Hagiographa. The Mavo adopts some of the critical theories of Johann Gottfried Eichhorn.

=== Poetry ===
Ben-Ze'ev was the author of Melitzah le-Purim, a collection of mock prayers and seliḥot for Purim, which was often published with Kalonymus ben Kalonymus' celebrated Talmudical parody Masekhet Purim. In 1810, he released a poem in honour of the marriage of Napoleon and Marie Louise, Duchess of Parma. Ben-Ze'ev also composed the earliest-known Hebrew erotic poems in the modern era, which circulated widely in manuscript form but were not published until the 20th century. These include Shir agavim, published by Getzel Kressel in 1977, and Derekh gever be-almah, a description of sexual intercourse using combinations of fractions of biblical verses.

== Criticism ==
While well regarded in Maskilic circles, Ben-Ze'ev was the subject of bitter denunciation from many traditionalists because of his heterodox Enlightenment activities. Rumours circulated of the writer having died on the toilet as divine punishment for editing the Talmud lashon ʻIvri on the Sabbath.

== Partial bibliography ==
- Talmud lashon ʻIvri: kolel yesodot dikduk ha-lashon [Study of the Hebrew Language] (in Hebrew). Vienna: Anton Schmid. 1805 [1796].
- Ḥokhmat Yehoshua ben Sira: neʻetak li-leshon ʻIvri ve-Ashkenazi u-meturgam Aramit [The Wisdom of Joshua ben Sira] (in Hebrew and Yiddish). Breslau. 1798.
- Beit ha-sefer: mesillat ha-limmud [The School]. 880-04Limude ha-mesharim (in Hebrew). Vol. 1. Vienna: Anton Schmid. 1816 [1802].
- Megilat Yehudit: ve-hu maʻase Yehudit im Oloferni [The Book of Judith] (in Hebrew and Yiddish). Vienna: Anton Schmid. 1819 [1799].
- Otzar ha-shorashim: kolel shorashe ha-lashon ha-ʻIvrit [Treasure of Roots] (in Hebrew). Vol. 1–3. Vienna: Anton Schmid. 1807.
- Mavo el mikraʼe kodesh [Introduction of the Holy Scriptures] (in Hebrew). Vienna: Anton Schmid. 1810.
- Yesode ha-dat: kolel ʻikkre ha-emunah [The Foundations of Religion: Including the Tenets of Faith] (in Hebrew). Vienna: Anton Schmid. 1811.
