= Nachman Krochmal =

Galician Jewish philosopher, theologian and historian (1785–1840)

Rabbi Nachman HaKohen Krochmal
- נחמן קְרוֹכְמַל
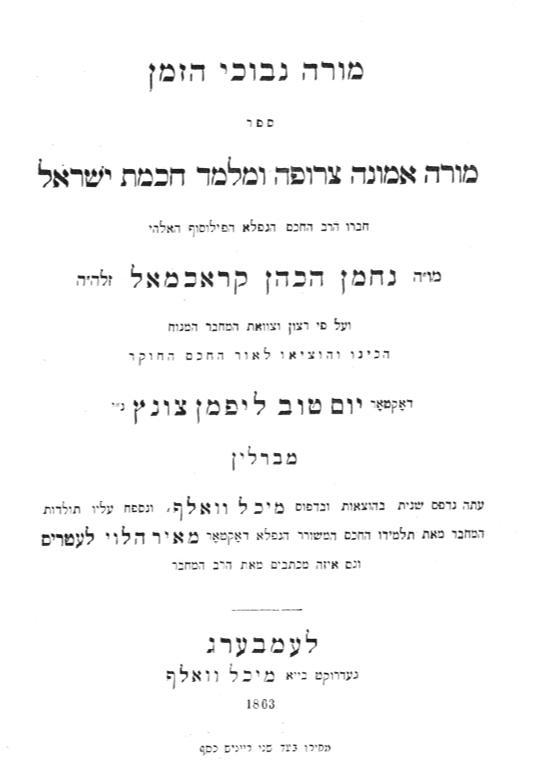
- Title page from Nachman Krochmal's Guide for the Perplexed of Our Time

Personal life
- Born: 17 February 1785 Brody, Galicia, Austrian Empire
- Died: 31 July 1840 (aged 55) Ternopil, Ukraine
- Known for: Moreh Nebukhe ha-Zeman (Guide for the Perplexed of the Time)
- Occupation: Philosopher, theologian, historian

Religious life
- Religion: Judaism

Nachman HaKohen Krochmal (Hebrew: נחמן קְרוֹכְמַל; born in Brody, Galicia, on 17 February 1785; died at Ternopil on 31 July 1840) was a Jewish Galician philosopher, theologian, and historian.

== Biography ==
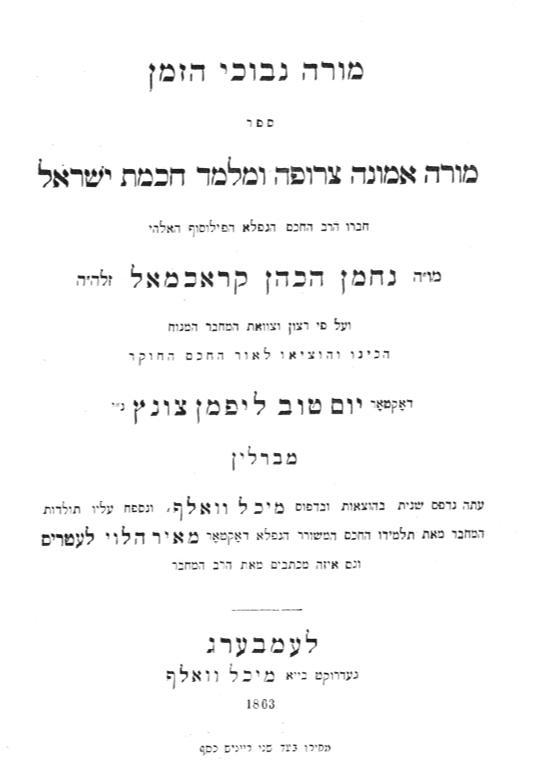
Title page from Nachman Krochmal's Guide for the Perplexed of Our Time

Nachman HaKohen Krochmal began studying Talmud at an early age. He married at fourteen as was customary at the time. The girl was the daughter of a wealthy merchant named Habermann. The couple lived with the father-in-law in Zhovkva, near Lemberg, where Krochmal devoted himself to full-time study. He learned German and began to read the German philosophers, especially Immanuel Kant. He also read Latin and French classics, and Arabic and Syriac books. After suffering from health problems, he sought treatment in Lemberg. There he met Samuel Judah Löb Rapoport. He became Rapoport's teacher, a collaboration that was ultimately fruitful for "Jewish science" (Wissenschaft des Judentums).

On his return to Żółkiew, he went back to studying philosophy. He delved into the work of Kant, Johann Gottlieb Fichte, Friedrich Wilhelm Joseph von Schelling and Georg Wilhelm Friedrich Hegel, whose ideas influenced him greatly. Aside from Rapoport, who often visited him in Żółkiew, he gathered around him a group of young students.

In 1814, after the death of his wife's parents, he went into business. Twelve years later he lost his wife and his health deteriorated. He refused an invitation to the rabbinate of Berlin despite the poor state of his business. Instead he began to work as a bookkeeper in Żółkiew, a position he held from 1836 to 1838. Now seriously ill, he went to stay with his daughter in Tarnopol and died there two years later.

== Literary career ==
Krochmal was reluctant to publish his writings. Apart from several Hebrew essays in periodicals (Sulamith, 1818; Ha-Ẓefirah, Zolkiev, 1824; and Kerem Ḥemed, vols. iv., v.), he wrote only one book, Moreh Nebuke ha-Zeman (Lemberg, 1851), edited, according to the author's last will, by Leopold Zunz, whom he admired as a great scholar though they never met. Other editions appeared in Lemberg in 1863 and Warsaw in 1898. The final, now-standard version of the text was established by Simon Rawidowicz in 1924. All later printings are facsimiles of the Rawidowicz edition.

=== Moreh Nevukhe ha-Zeman ===
Moreh Nevukhe ha-Zeman (Guide for the Perplexed of the Time) is a philosophy of Jewish history, and has a double importance. On the one side it was a critical examination of the Rabbinic literature and much influenced subsequent investigators. On the other side, Krochmal, in the words of Nahum Slouschz, "was the first Jewish scholar who views Judaism, not as a distinct and independent entity, but as a part of the whole of civilization." Krochmal, under Hegelian influences, regarded the nationality of Israel as consisting in its religious genius, its spiritual gifts. Thus Krochmal may be called the originator of the idea of the mission of the Jewish people, "cultural Zionism".

The book is divided into seventeen chapters, of which the first six deal with religion in general.

Ch. vii describes Israel's spiritual gift as the desire for and faculty of seeking God. The next three chapters contain a philosophical analysis of Jewish history, which, corresponding to Israel's attachment to the Lord, that is, to its religious development, is divided into three epochs. These epochs terminate respectively: (1) with the death of Gedaliah after the destruction of the Temple; (2) with the death of Bar Kokba (ca. 135); and (3) with the expulsion of the Jews from Spain (1492). The author does not characterize the modern period in which he himself lived.

Ch. xi-xv deal with the post-exilic Biblical and the Apocryphal literature and with the various religious movements. The author discusses also the necessity of tradition and gives a critical résumé of the development of the Halakhah and Aggadah.

Ch. xvi gives a brief sketch of the future development of Jewish religious philosophy based on the principles of Hegel. The work finishes with an exposition of Ibn Ezra's philosophy. The historical digressions in the book touch the profoundest problems of Jewish science; and it remains their indisputable merit to have paved the way for critical studies in Jewish history. The work really became, as intended by the author, a "guide" to students of Jewish science in the nineteenth century.

Krochmal presented a universal theory of "organismic-cyclical" Jewish history, and believed that Jews defied the laws of human history.
