= Anton Edler von Schmid =

Austrian printer and publisher (1765–1855)

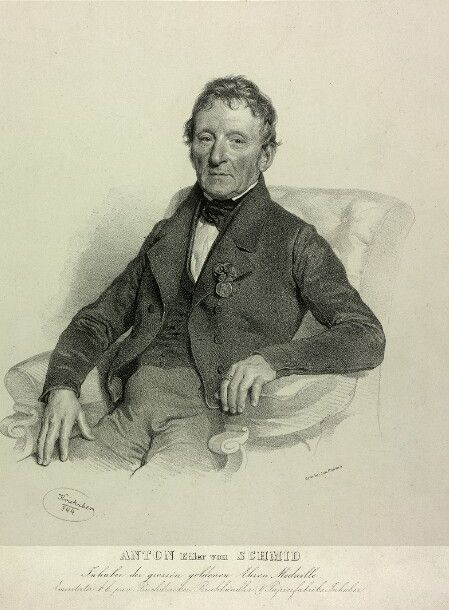
- Born: Anton Schmid; 23 January 1765; Zwettl, Holy Roman Empire
- Died: 27 June 1855 (aged 90); Vienna, Austrian Empire
- Education: Academy of Oriental Languages
- Occupation: Publisher
- Children: Franz Edler von Schmid

Anton Edler von Schmid (23 January 1765 – 27 June 1855) was an Austrian printer and publisher of Hebrew books.

== Early life and education ==
Anton Schmid was born in Zwettl, Lower Austria. His father, a cook at the Zwettl monastery, intended for him to have a career in clergy, and with this view Anton received a collegiate education at the Abbey. He continued his studies at the Zwettl seminary in Vienna to prepare himself for the university, but, declining to become a clergyman, he had to leave the institution.

In May 1785, he entered as an apprentice the establishment of the court printer Josef von Kurzböck, who at that time was engaged in printing Illyrian, Wallachian, and Russian writings, and, prompted by Emperor Joseph II, began to set up the printing of Hebrew and Oriental books. For this purpose, the emperor allowed some of Kurzböck's typesetters, among them Schmid, to attend the Academy of Oriental Languages.

== Career ==
Schmid in consequence was assigned to Hebrew typesetting, for which he had a great predilection. Having become acquainted with Jewish scholars and booksellers and with the needs of the Hebrew reading public, he bought from Kurzböck his Hebrew types in order to establish himself as a printer and publisher. With the help of his brother-in-law, the master baker M. Wagner, he succeeded in getting his enterprise off the ground, but when he applied for a privilege, the Viennese book printers tried to prevent the granting of a new right and Schmid was rejected. (Schmid's first publications were thus issued under Kurzböck's name.) Thereupon he personally presented a petition to Emperor Francis II, who granted him the privilege on the condition that he would present a copy of each book printed by him to the Imperial Library.

Schmid's great success soon enabled him to take over Kurzböck's entire printing establishment, and purchase a new publishing house in Alservorstadt. In 1800, the government prohibited the import of Hebrew books, to the great advantage of Schmid, who without hindrance reprinted the works issued by Wolf Heidenheim in Rödelheim. The printing was under the supervision of Joseph della Torre and afterward of his son Adalbert, and Schmid became increasingly prosperous.

His publications were sent far abroad, from Germany, Poland and Russia to Turkey, the Barbary states, Palestine, and Egypt. By 1816, he had presented to the Imperial Library eighty-six works comprising 200 volumes; and his great merit was acknowledged by a gold medal from the emperor on 12 December 1816. He then enlarged his establishment, printing Arabic, Persian, and Syriac books also, and upon the donation of 17 new Oriental works in 44 volumes to the court library he received the noble title Edler von. A few years later he made a third donation of 148 works in 347 volumes, presenting a similar gift to the Jewish religious school of Vienna. His son Franz Schmid took charge of the establishment on 26 October 1839, and sold it to Adalbert della Torre in 1849.

Among Schmid's publications were editions of the Pentateuch, Psalms, the Talmud, various Jewish prayer books, and the works of Maimonides. He published a large number of Maskilic literature, including the Hebrew Bible with German translation and the commentary of the Biurists, the Hebrew periodical Bikkure ha-'Ittim, and the works of Maskilim Judah Leib Ben-Ze'ev, Meïr Obernik, Samuel Detmold, Hermann Engländer, and Meïr Letteris.

== Personal life ==
Schmid was married twice. His first wife died after only four years of marriage, and their two children soon after. His second marriage, in 1798, produced nine children, including Franz. Schmid lost his second wife in 1840, and he survived her by another 15 years, dying in 1855 at the age of 90.
