= Solomon Judah Loeb Rapoport =

Galician and Czech rabbi and Jewish scholar (1786–1867)

- שלמה יהודה כהן רפאפורט
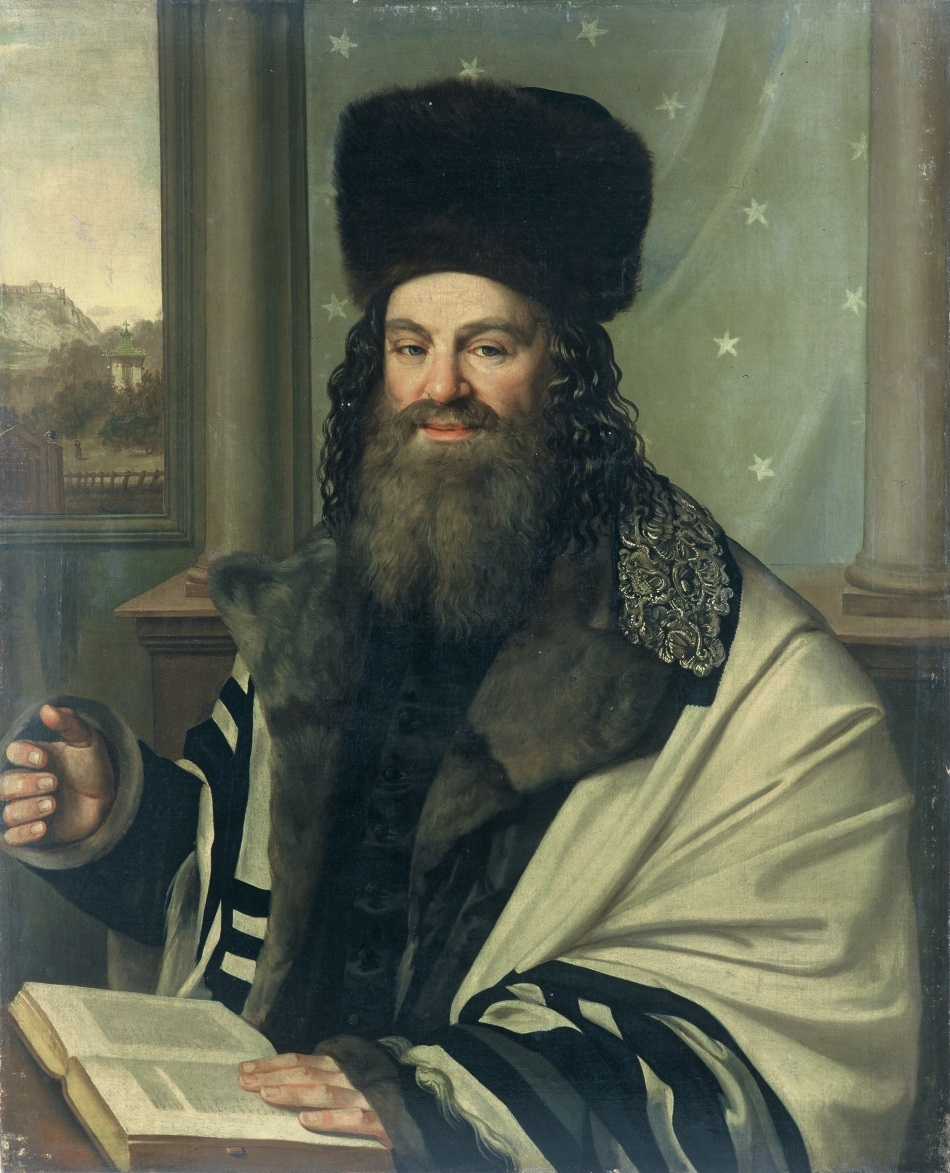
- Portrait by Antonín Machek
- Born: Solomon Judah Loeb Rapoport; June 1, 1786; Lemberg, Kingdom of Galicia and Lodomeria
- Died: October 15, 1867 (aged 81)
- Occupations: Rabbi, Jewish Scholar
- Known for: Founder of the new Wissenschaft des Judentums movement

Signature
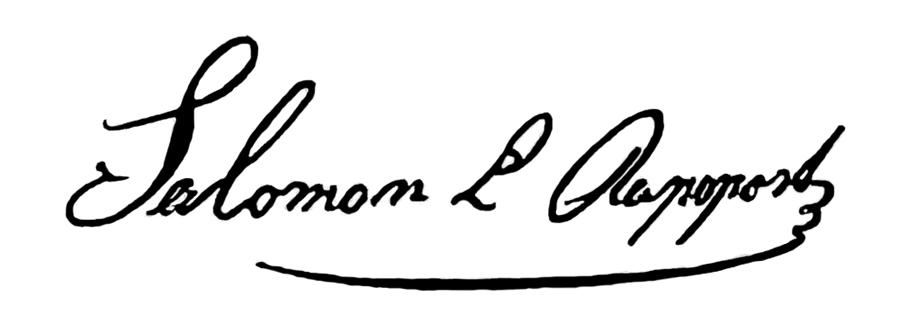

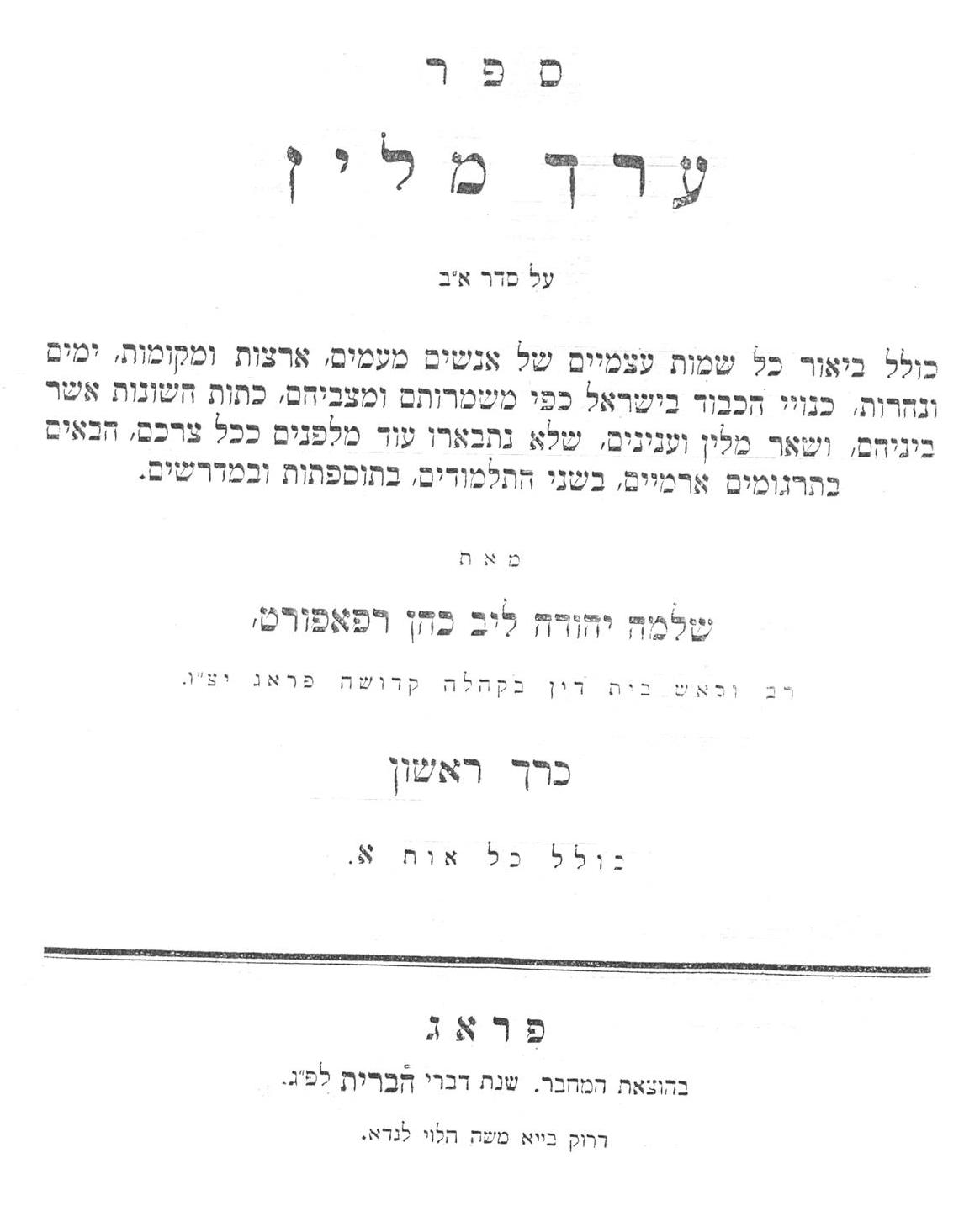
Title page of Rapoport's Erekh Millin

Solomon Judah Loeb Rapoport (Hebrew: שלמה יהודה כהן רפאפורט; June 1, 1786 – October 15, 1867) was a Galician and Czech rabbi and Jewish scholar. Rapoport was known by an acronym "Shir", שי״ר occasionally שיל״ר, formed by the initial letters of his Hebrew name "Sh"elomo "Y"ehuda "R"apoport. Shir literally means "song" in Hebrew. He was one of the founders of the new Wissenschaft des Judentums movement.

== Life ==
Solomon Judah Loeb Rapoport was born in Lemberg, Kingdom of Galicia and Lodomeria. His father, Rabbi Aharon Hayim Rappaport was a renowned scholar, and his primary teacher. Rappaport was also recognized as an illui. In 1810, he married Franziska Freide Heller, the daughter of the well-known Aryeh Leib Heller. He died in Prague.

After various experiences in business, Rapoport became rabbi of Tarnopol (1837) and of Prague (1840). He had been "thrown upon his own resources" about 1817, and became the collector of the meat-tax on farmers. Because of his work on Saadia Gaon, see below, he received recognition in the scholarly world and gained "many enthusiastic friends", especially S. D. Luzzatto, leading to his appointment as Rabbi.

== Works ==
Rapoport was instrumental in publishing his father-in-law's work Avnei Miluim, writing the index, sources, and numerous comments.

His chief work was the first part of an (unfinished) encyclopaedia "Erekh Millin", 1852. Equally notable were his biographies of Saadia Gaon, Nathan ben Jehiel (author of the Arukh), Hai Gaon, Eleazar Kalir, and others. His early writings were poems and translations. Thereafter his publications showed "evidence of marked critical ability". In 1824 he wrote an article for Bikkure ha-'Ittim on the independent Jewish tribes of Arabia and Abyssinia. His work on Saadia Gaon and his times was published in the same journal in 1829, the first of a series of his biographical works on the medieval Jewish sages.

=== Ten Sephirot as vowel sounds ===
Rapoport notes that according to the Masoretes there are ten vowel sounds. He suggests that the passage in the Sefer Yetzirah, which discusses the manipulation of letters in the creation of the world, can be better understood if the Sephirot refer to vowel sounds. He posits that the word sephirah in this case is related to the Hebrew word sippur ("to retell"). His position is based on his belief that most Kabbalistic works written after Sefer Yetzirah (including the Zohar) are forgeries.
