= List of first novels by language =

A list of first novels published in various languages.

Language	Year of publication	Name of the novel	Name in native language	Author	Country
Abkhazian	1937	Temyr	Temyr	Ivan Papaskiri	Soviet Union
Afrikaans	1861	Conversations between Klaas Waarzegger and Jan Twyfelaar	Zamenspraak tusschen Klaas Waarzegger en Jan Twyfelaar	L. H. Meurant	South Africa
Albanian	1905	Shkoder under siege	Shkodra e rrethueme	Ndoc Nikaj	Albania
Amharic	1908	A Heart-born Story	Ləbb Wälläd Tarik	Afevork Ghevre Jesus	Ethiopia
Armenian	1858	Wounds of Armenia	Վերք Հայաստանի	Khachatur Abovian	Russian Empire
Assamese	1890	Bhanumati	ভানুমতী	Padmanath Gohain Baruah	India
Arabic	1160 (approx.)	Hayy ibn Yaqdhan	حي بن يقظان	Ibn Tufayl	Al-Andalus
Aromanian	1903	Graves Without Crosses	Mirmintsã fãrã crutsi	Nuși Tulliu	Romania
Bengali	1857	Alaler Gharer Dulal	আলালের ঘরের দুলাল	Peary Chand Mitra	India
Bhojpuri	1956	Bindiya	बिंदिया	Ramnath Pandey	India
Burmese	1904	Maung Yin Maung, Ma Me Ma	မောင်ရင်မောင် မမယ်မ	James Hla Kyaw	Myanmar
Catalan	1283	Romance of Evast and Blaquerna	Romanç d'Evast e Blaquerna	Ramon Llull	Majorca (Crown of Aragon)
French	1607	L'Astrée	L'Astrée	Honoré d'Urfé	France
Greek	1st century	The Loves of Chǣreas and Callirrhoe	Τῶν περὶ Χαιρέαν καὶ Καλλιρρόην	Chariton	Roman Empire
Hebrew	1819	Revealer of Secrets	מגלה טמירין	Joseph Perl	Austrian Empire
Hindi	1882	Pariksha Guru	परीक्षागुरू	Lala Srinivas Das	India
Irish	1901	Cormac Ó Conaill	Cormac Ó Conaill	Patrick S. Dinneen	Ireland
Japanese	11th century	The Tale of Genji	源氏物語	Murasaki Shikibu	Japan
Haitian Creole	1975	Dézafi	Dézafi	Frankétienne	Haiti
Indonesian	1920	Pain and Suffering	Azab dan Sengsara	Merari Siregar	Indonesia
Kannada	1899	Indira Bai		Gulvadi Venkata Rao	India
Kerewe	1980	Mr. Myombekere and His Wife Bugonoka, Their Son Ntulanalwo and Daughter Bulihwali	Bwana Myombekere na Bibi Bugonoka, Ntulanalwo na Bulihwali	Aniceti Kitereza	Tanzania
Latin	1st century	Satyricon		Petronius	Roman Empire
Luxembourgish	1921	The Cage Flower	D'Kerfegsblo'm	Adolf Berens	Luxembourg
Malayalam	1887	Kundalatha	കുന്ദലത	Appu Nedungadi	India
Meitei	1930	Madhavi	মাধবী	Lamabam Kamal Singh	India
Marathi	1857	Yamuna Paryatan	यमुना पर्यटन	Baba Padamji	India
Mongolian	around 1930	The Blue Chronicle	Köke sudur	Vanchinbalyn Injinash	Mongolia
Nepali	1903	Bir Charitra	वीर चरित्र	Girish Ballabh Joshi	Nepal
Northern Ndebele	1956	The Ndebele Uprising	Umvukela WamaNdebele	Ndabaningi Sithole	Zimbabwe
Odia	1888	Padmamali	ପଦ୍ମମାଳୀ	Umesh Chandra Sarkar	India
Persian	1937	The Blind Owl	بوف کور	Sadegh Hedayat	Iran
Pashto	1912	Mah Rukh		Rahat Zakheli	Pakistan
Polish	1776	The Adventures of Mr. Nicholas Wisdom	Mikołaja Doświadczyńskiego przypadki	Ignacy Krasicki	Polish–Lithuanian Commonwealth
Punjabi	1898	Sundari	ਸੁੰਦਰੀ	Bhai Vir Singh	India
Sanskrit	7th century	Kadambari	कादम्बरी	Bāṇabhaṭṭa	India
Shona	1956	Feso	Feso	Solomon Mutswairo	Zimbabwe
Slovak	1783	René	René	Jozef Ignác Bajza	Kingdom of Hungary
Tamil	1879	Prathapa Mudaliar Charitram	பிரதாப முதலியார் சரித்திரம்	Samuel Vedanayagam Pillai	India
Telugu	1867	Sri Rangaraju Charitra		Narahari Gopalakrishnama Setty	India
Thai	1914	Khwam Mai Phayabat	ความไม่พยาบาท	Khru Liam	Thailand
Turkish	1872	The Love of Talat and Fitnat	Taaşşuk-ı Talat ve Fitnat	Sami Frashëri	Turkey
Urdu	1869	Mirat-ul-Uroos	مراۃ العروس	Nazir Ahmad Dehlvi	India
Uzbek	1926	Bygone Days	O’tkan Kunlar	Abdullah Qodiriy	Uzbekistan
Xhosa	1907	USamson	USamson	S.E.K. Mqhayi	South Africa
Yiddish	1864	Dos kleyne mentshele	דאס קליינע מענטשעלע	Mendele Mocher Sforim	Russian Empire

== See also ==
- List of claimed first novels in English
- Category:Novels by date
