= Mordecai Suchostaver =

Personal life
- Born: 1790 near Brody, Habsburg Empire
- Died: 29 July 1880 (aged 89–90) Zhitomir, Volhynian Governorate, Russian Empire

Religious life
- Religion: Judaism

Mordecai Suchostaver (Yiddish: מרדכי סוחאסטאווער; 1790 – 29 July 1880) was a Galician adherent of the Haskalah, and teacher of philosophy at the rabbinical seminary of Zhitomir. He was a student of Nachman Krochmal and Menachem Mendel Levin.

== Biography ==
Mordecai Suchostaver was born in 1790 near Brody, Galicia. He left Brody for Odessa, where, in the early 1830s, he was appointed private secretary and tutor in the household of Joseph Günzburg, settling in Kamenetz-Podolsk. Upon the opening of the rabbinical seminary at Zhitomir, Suchostaver was called to that city. He remained until the institution was closed in 1873. Among his students at the seminary were Abraham Jacob Paperna and Hirtz Gintzburg.

Influenced by the school of the Haskalah, Suchostaver wrote a philosophical introduction to Maimonides' Moreh nevukhim, which was published at Zolkiev in 1829. He was the author also of several Biblical-scientific articles, preserved in manuscript, one of which, entitled Edim zomemim, a treatise on Deuteronomy 19:15–20, appeared in the monthly Mitzpah (1885, part iii.).

He died in Zhitomir on 29 July 1880.
