= Ravine-Sèche =

- Village
- Location in Haiti
- Coordinates: 19°13′0″N 72°47′0″W
- Country: Haiti
- Department: Artibonite
- Arrondissement: Saint-Marc
- Time zone: UTC-5 (UTC)

Ravine-Sèche (French pronunciation: [ʁavin sɛʃ]) is a village in Haiti of the Saint-Marc Arrondissement in Artibonite department. It is the birthplace of notable writer and artist, Frankétienne.
