= Désastre (12 janvier 2010) =

Painting by Frankétienne

Désastre (12 Janvier 2010)
- Artist: Frankétienne
- Year: c. 2010
- Type: Acrylic on Canvas
- Dimensions: 122 cm × 152 cm (48 in × 60 in)

Désastre (12 janvier 2010) is an artwork of Haitian artist Frankétienne. This acrylic on canvas was painted between 15 and 16 January 2010, the same week the 2010 earthquake hit Port-au-Prince, Haiti's capital city. The artwork represents the victims below the city's wreckage.

It was shown to the public for the last time during the exposition "Pour la memoire et la lumière" ("For memory and light") promoted by the foundation Ayiti Bel at the Hotel NH Haiti El Rancho, in Pétion-Ville, Haití, between 11 and 25 April 2014.

Later, it was acquired by a private collector.

== Gallery ==
During the exposition "Pour la lumière et la memoire" in April, 2014
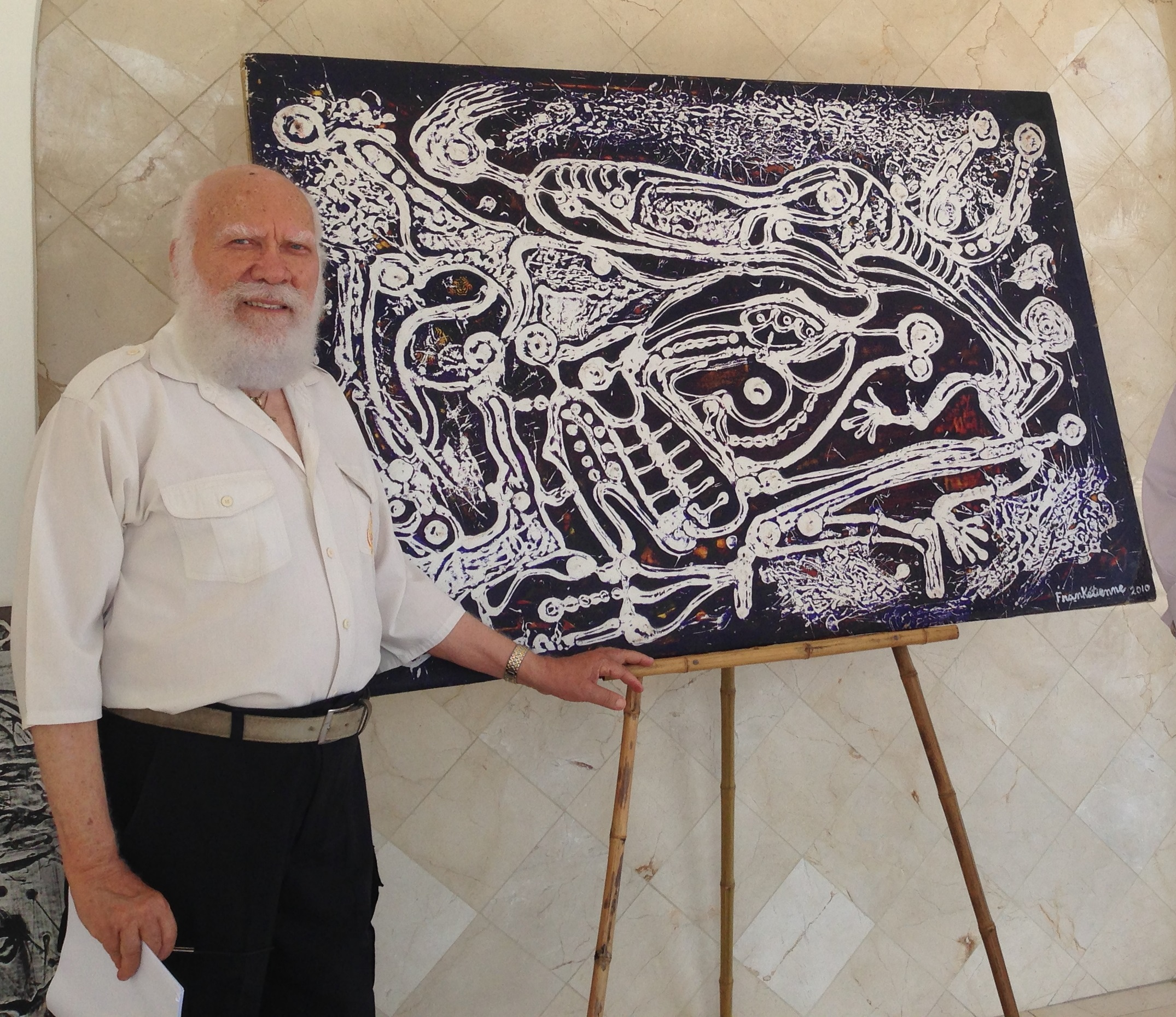
Frankétienne poses in front of his acrylic on canvas.

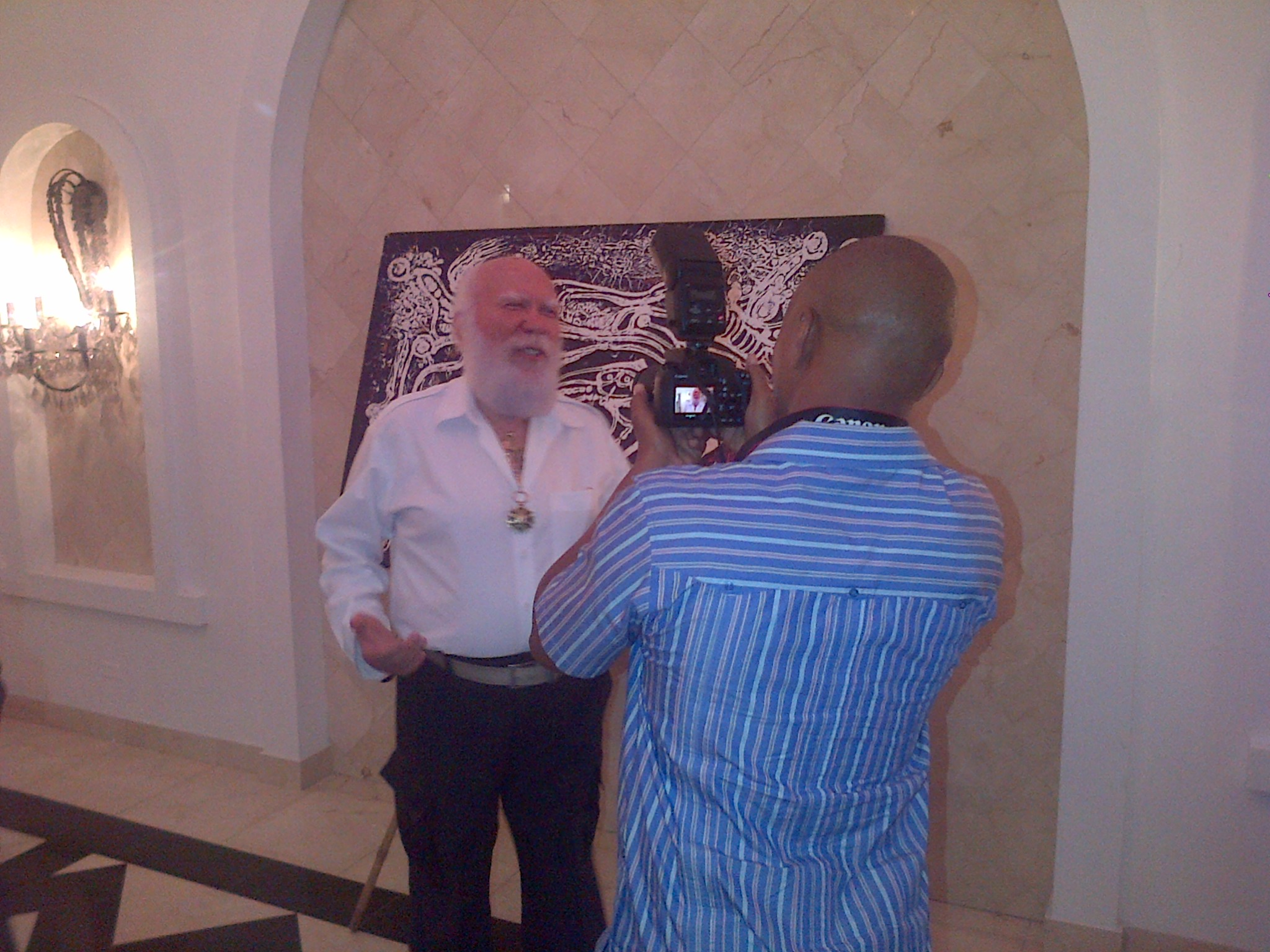
Frankétienne is interviewed.
