= Aaron Halle-Wolfssohn =

Aaron Halle-Wolfssohn (Hebrew: אהרן בן וואָלף מהאללי; 1754 or 1756, in probably Halle – 20 March 1835, in Fürth) was a German-Jewish writer, translator, and Biblical commentator. He was a leading writer of the Haskalah.

== Biography ==
He was born in Halle and died in Fürth. He was professor at the Königliche Wilhelms-Schule at Breslau from 1792 to 1807. After 1807, he became private tutor in Berlin of the sons of the financier Judah Herz Beer, and of Jakob Beer (later known as Giacomo Meyerbeer) in particular. Letters between Jakob Beer and Aron Wolfssohn have been published among the Meyerbeer correspondence.

Besides translating much of the Tanakh into German, he published a Hebrew-German primer (Abtalion), commentaries, essays and the play Leichtsinn und Frömmelei (written in 1796).

== Bibliography ==
- Jeremy Dauber (2004), Antonio's Devils: Writers of the Jewish Enlightenment and the Birth of Modern Hebrew and Yiddish Literature. Stanford University Press. ISBN 0-8047-4901-9 Review of this book
