= Revealer of Secrets =

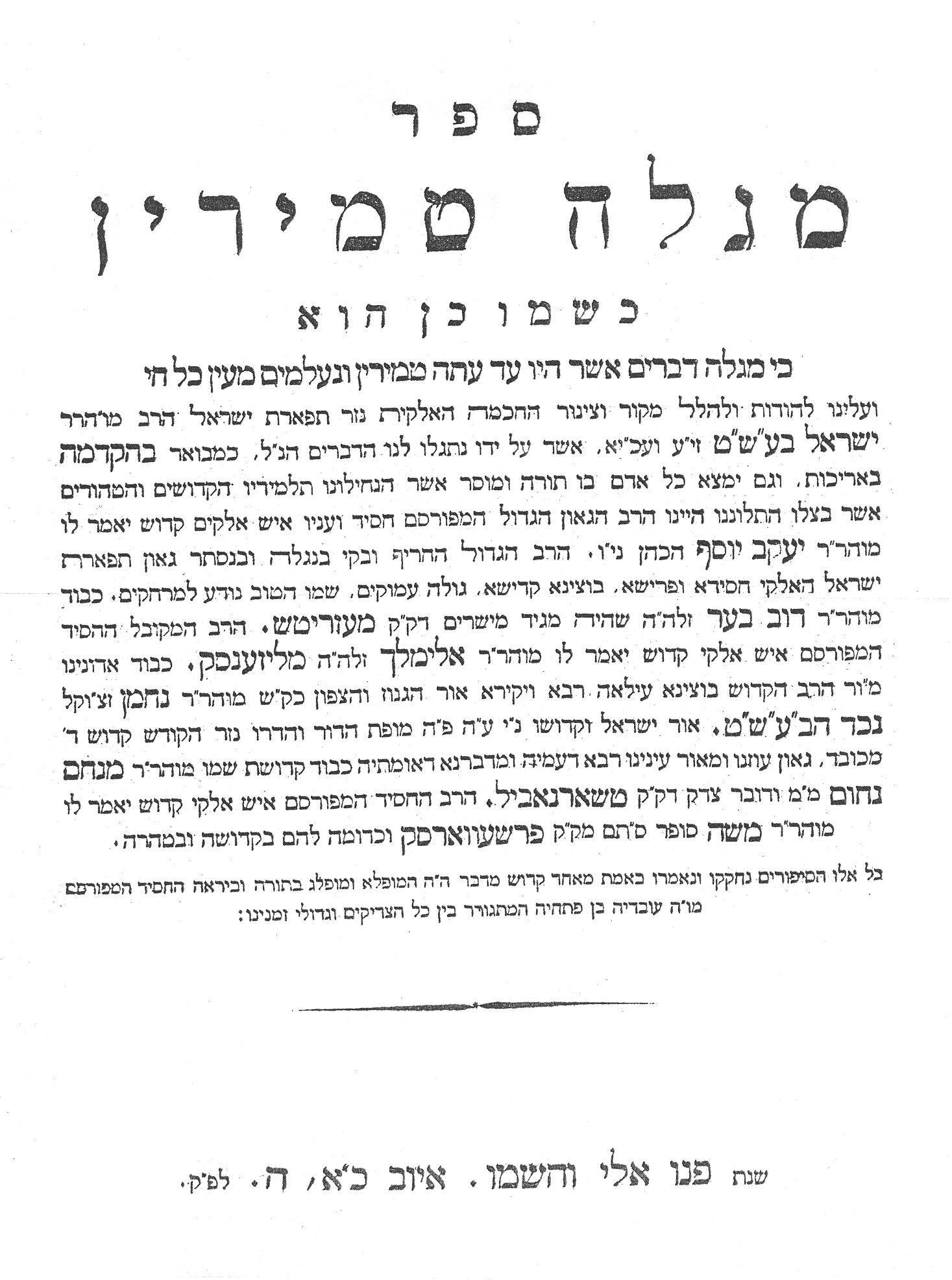
title page of first edition

Revealer of Secrets (Hebrew: מגלה טמירין), first published in 1819, is an epistolary novel by Joseph Perl, a proponent of Jewish emancipation and Haskalah. It is often considered the first modern novel in Hebrew. The book purports to be a collection of letters between various hasidic rabbis, but is actually a satire of their teachings.

== Background ==
Hasidism began in the late 1740s under Ukrainian Rabbi Yisroel Baal Shem Tov. His followers published a collection of stories about his life, Shivhei ha-Besht (ln Praise of the Ba'al Shem Tov), in 1815.

The following year Perl published Ueber das Wesen der Sekte Chassidim aus ihren eigenen Schriften gezogen (On the Nature of the Sect of the Hasidim, Drawn from Their Own Writings), in which he laid out what he saw as the absurdity of Hasidic beliefs and practices.

In 1819 he continued his writings against Hasidism by publishing a novel about the subject. In the novel, characters search for the original copy of a recently published anti-Hasidic book. The novel was originally published anonymously.

== Writing style ==
The novel was seen as part of the theological debate between adherents of Haskala (the Jewish Enlightenment) and the religious revivalism of Hasidism.

The novel used the epistolary tradition of European novels such as Samuel Richardson's Pamela and brought this style into Jewish literature. Perl also made use of scholarly and pseudo-scholarly footnotes throughout the novel.

It is an unusual book in that it satirizes the language and style of early hasidic rabbis writing in Hebrew, which was not the vernacular of the Jews of its time. To make his work available and accessible to his contemporaries, Perl translated his own work into Yiddish. It is currently in print only in an English translation, by Dov Taylor, published by Westview Press.

== Sources ==
- Dov Taylor. Joseph Perl's Revealer of Secrets: The First Hebrew Novel. Westview Press. Boulder, Colorado. 1997. Translation with notes, commentary, and introductory materials. ISBN 0-8133-3212-5
