= Frankétienne =

Haitian artist and writer (1936–2025)

- Born: Jean-Pierre Basilic Dantor Franck Étienne d'Argent; 12 April 1936; Ravine-Sèche, Haiti
- Died: 20 February 2025 (aged 88); Delmas, Haiti
- Occupations: Writer, poet, playwright, painter, musician
- Spouse: Marie Andrée Etienne
- Writing career
- Notable awards: Commander Ordre des Arts et Lettres (2010); Grand prix de la francophonie (2021)

Jean-Pierre Basilic Dantor Franck Étienne d'Argent (Haitian Creole pronunciation: [fɣãŋ.ket.jɛ̃n]; 12 April 1936 – 20 February 2025), known by his pen name Frankétienne, was a Haitian writer, poet, playwright, and painter. He is recognized as one of Haiti's leading writers and playwrights in both French and Haitian Creole, and is "known as the father of Haitian letters". He was a candidate for the Nobel Prize in Literature in 2009, made a Commander of the Ordre des Arts et des Lettres (Order of the Arts and Letters), and was named UNESCO Artist for Peace in 2010.

== Life and career ==
Jean-Pierre Basilic Dantor Franck Étienne d'Argent was born in Ravine-Sèche, a small village in Haiti. His mother, Annette Étienne, a black Haitian, was 16 when she gave birth to him, and his father, Benjamin Lyles, a wealthy white American, was 63. His father then abandoned the family. Frankétienne later said that he was given his first names by his mother and grandmother to protect him from sorcery. He was raised by his mother in the Bel Air neighborhood of Port-au-Prince, where she was a respected entrepreneur, owning her own business to support her eight children, managing to send him, her eldest, to school. He grew up to work as a teacher in Bel Air. At the age of 5, he was enrolled in Petit Séminaire Collège Saint-Martial, where he learned French. Although he excelled in mathematics and physics, he failed the entrance exam for medicine, so he enrolled in an American mechanical school.

=== Writing ===
He attended the Institute of Higher International Studies in Haiti, where he was taught by Pradel Pompilus and Ghislain Gouraige. There, he first began writing poetry around 1960. He published his first texts – Au fils du temps, La marche, Mon côté gauche, and Vigie et verre in 1964 to 1965. His first novel, Mûr à crever, was published in 1968. He was known as one of the main figures of the Haitian literary movement spiralism, alongside Jean-Claude Fignolé and René Philoctète.

In 1975, he published Dézafi (widely considered to be the first modern novel written entirely in Haitian Creole), and from 1977 onwards he worked in theater, producing the works Trofouban (1977), Pèlin-tèt (1978), Bobomasouri (1984), Kaselezo (1985), and Totolomannwe (1986).

=== Painting ===
He began to paint in 1973 and the first exhibition of his paintings took place in Port-au-Prince in 1974. As of 2004, he had made about a thousand paintings. His style was "expressive" and "abstract," often favoring red and blue, the colors of the Haitian flag.

== Awards and recognition ==
- In 1988, he served for four months as Minister of Culture of Haiti.
- Candidate for the Nobel Prize in Literature (2009)
- Commander of the Ordre des Arts et des Lettres (2010)
- UNESCO Artist for Peace (2010), in recognition for his efforts to preserve Haitian culture and language.
- Grand prix de la francophonie (2021)

== Death and legacy ==
Frankétienne died in Delmas on 20 February 2025, at the age of 88. The circumstances of his death were not announced. Haitian Prime Minister Alix Didier Fils-Aimé said of him "Through his writings, he illuminated the world, carried the soul of Haiti and defied silence. May his word remain, may his spirit still blow. Farewell, master." He was survived by his wife, Marie-Andrée Étienne, his son Rudolphe, and his daughter Stéphane.

== Selected works ==
- Au Fil du Temps (1964)
- Mûr à Crever (1968)
- Ultravocal (1972)
- Dézafi (1975)
- Trofouban (1977)
- Pèlin-Tèt (1978)
- Bobomasouri (1984)
- Kaselezo (1985)
- Totolomannwe (1986)
- Adjanoumelezo (1987)
- L'oiseau-schizophone (1993)
- H'Eros-Chimères (2002)
- Désastre (12 janvier 2010), painting
- Difficile émergence vers la lumière, painting
