= Bir Charitra =

First Nepali language novel

- Cover page of 1965 edition
- Author: Girish Ballabh Joshi
- Original title: वीर चरित्र
- Language: Nepali
- Genre: Fantasy
- Publisher: Jagadamba Press
- Publication date: 1903 (First part); 1965 (Complete novel)
- Publication place: Nepal
- Media type: Print (Paperback)
- Pages: 525

Bir Charitra (Nepali: वीर चरित्र) is a Nepali fantasy novel written by Girish Ballabh Joshi. The first part of the novel was written in c. 1899 (1956 BS) and was published in 1903 by Pashupat Press but soon the Rana government restricted the publication of other volumes. The complete all four parts of the novel was published only in 1965 (2022 BS) by Jagadamba Press. It is considered to be the first novel of Nepali literature.

== Background ==
Girish Ballav Joshi worked as a Kabiraj (Ayurvedic practitioner) in Rana palace. He was hugely influenced by the Hindi writer Devaki Nandan Khatri. Joshi even named his son ad Devaki Nath after Khatri. Khatri was one of the earliest Hindi novelist and was widely popular for his fantasy novel Chandrakanta. Joshi being influenced by Khatri wrote the novel of the similar genre. Even though only the first part of the novel was published in 1903, the novel became highly popular.

The first part of the novel was published by Nara Dev Moti-krishna Pashupati Press. It became popular among the women of the Rana courts and came under the notice of Rana officials. The Rana regime unofficially banned the publication of the other parts of the novel. Pashupat press refused to print the further part of the novel. Joshi was also stopped from writing the fifth part of the novel. However, the manuscript of the novel was passed among the readers. Many copies of the manuscript was produced.

== Synopsis ==
The novel is a satirical work on the Rana regime and is set in the western region of Nepal. The novel starts from the Baglung district of Nepal. It is an adventure of three princes in search of Agni Dutta, the son of a Brahmin named Ganesh Dutta. When Agni Dutta is kidnapped by a couple, Ganesh Dutta pleads the princes for their help. The novel contains various mythological creatures such as Rakshasa, demons, Nagas, etc. and fantasy elements alongside science fictions elements.

== See also ==
- Bhanubhakta Ramayana
- Madhabi
