= Abraham Jacob Paperna =

Russian Jewish educator and author

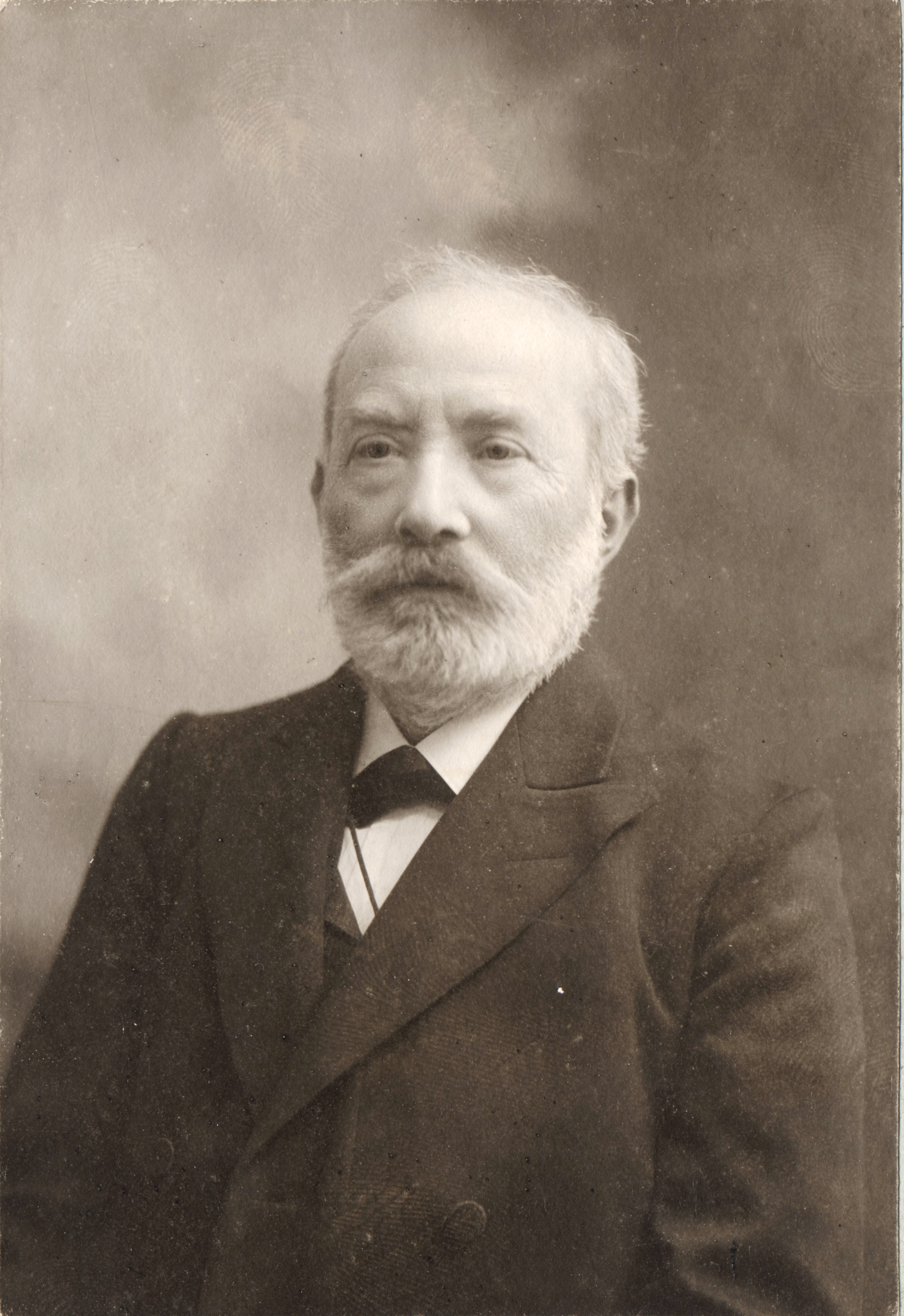
- Abraham Jacob Paperna before World War I
- Born: 30 August 1840; Kapyl, Minsk Governorate, Russian Empire
- Died: 18 February 1919 (aged 78); Odessa, Ukrainian People's Republic
- Writing career
- Literary movement: Haskalah

Signature
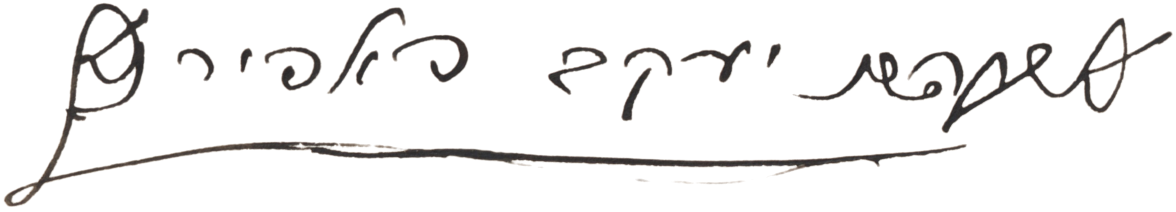

Abraham Jacob Paperna (Hebrew: אברהם יעקב פפירנא; 30 August 1840 – 18 February 1919) was a Russian Jewish educator and author.

== Early life and education ==
Abraham Jacob Paperna was born in 1840 in Kapyl, Minsk Governorate (today part of Belarus). He received a fair education, including the study of the Bible with Moses Mendelssohn's translation, Hebrew grammar, Talmud, and secular literature. In 1863 he entered the rabbinical school of Zhitomir, where he studied until 1865; he was then transferred to the rabbinical school of Vilna, from which he graduated in 1867.

== Career and later life ==
In 1868 he was appointed teacher at the government Jewish school at Zakroczym, Warsaw Governorate, and in 1870 he became principal of the government Jewish school of Płock, Suwałki Governorate. He was also instructor in Judaism at the gymnasium in the latter town.

Paperna was intimately connected with the Russian Haskalah movement in the last quarter of the nineteenth century, and contributed various books and articles to Russian as well as to Hebrew literature. His first Hebrew poem, Emet ve-Emunah, appeared in Ha-Karmel in 1863; Paperna was a steady contributor to that periodical as well as to Ha-Melitz. Critical articles by him, entitled Kankan ḥadash male’ yashan (in Ha-Karmel, 1867, and printed separately in Vilna), attracted wide attention in the circles of the Maskilim. In these articles Paperna, influenced probably by the Russian critic Dmitry Pisarev, adopted modern realistic methods of criticism. He argued against pseudo-classicism in Hebrew literature, and the "guess-philology" in the commentaries on the Torah and the Talmud. He also ridiculed the presumption of some of the young Maskilim, who from a desire for fame attempted to write books in Hebrew on botany, astronomy, and the other exact sciences, with which they were entirely unfamiliar.

An essay on drama entitled Ha-Drama bi-khelal veha-‘ivrit bi-ferat appeared as a supplement to Ha-Melitz in 1867. It attracted harsh criticism from Abraham Dob Bär Lebensohn in his pamphlet Tokaḥti la-Beḳarim, written under the pseudonym "S. Friedman" (Paperna had attacked Lebensohn's Emet ve-Emunah), and from Joshua Steinberg (En Mishpat). In 1869 Paperna published an article on the Russification of Jews in Congress Poland, entitled K yevreiskomu voprosu v Vislyanskom kraye ('On the Jewish question in the Vistula Land', in Den, No. 13).

Among his articles on education may be mentioned O khederakh voobshche (Płock, 1884), on the chadorim. Memoirs (Zikhronot) by Paperna on the rabbinical school of Zhitomir and its professors appeared in Sokolov's Sefer ha-Shanah (1900, p. 60).

== Publications ==
- "Emet ve-emunah" [Truth and Faith]. Ha-Karmel (in Hebrew). 1863.
- Kankan ḥadash male' yashan [A New Jug Filled with the Old] (in Hebrew). Vilna: s.n. 1867. Originally published in Ha-Karmel.
- Ha-drama bi-khelal veha-'ivrit bi-ferat [Drama in General and Hebrew [Drama] in Particular]. Odessa: L. Nitshe et A. Tsedeboym. 1868. Originally published in Ha-Melitz.
- "K yevreiskomu voprosu v Vislyanskom kraye" [On the Jewish Question in the Vistula Land]. Den (13). 1869.
- Mesillat ha-limmud. Warsaw. 1871. A Hebrew grammar in Russian.
- Kratkaya grammatika russkavo yazyka. Warsaw. 1874.
- More sefat Russiya (in Hebrew). Warsaw. 1876. (3d ed., 1884.) Ollendorff's method for the study of the Russian language by Jews.
- O khederakh voobshche. Płock. 1884.
- Merutz iggerot / Samouchitel' russkavo yazyka (in Hebrew and Russian). Warsaw: Aleksander Ginz. 1874. hdl:2027/hvd.hwmlxp. (3d ed., 1884.) A Hebrew-Russian letter-writer.
- Praḳṭishes lehrbukh um grindlikh tsu erlernen di Rusishe shprakhe nokh Allendorfs meṭhode (in Yiddish). Warsaw: Yehoshua Gershon Munk. 1890. Yiddish version of More Sefat Russiya.
- Siḥat ḥayot ve-'ofot [A Conversation of Beasts and Fowl] (in Hebrew). Krakow: Josef Fischer. 1892. hdl:2027/hvd.hwmnms.
- "Zikhronot" [Memories]. Sefer Ha-Shanah (in Hebrew). 1900.
- Zikhroyness [Memories] (in Yiddish). Warsaw: Farlag Tsenṭral. 1923.
