= Girish Ballabh Joshi =

Nepali writer (1867–1923)

- गिरीशवल्लभ जाेशी
- Born: Yadunath Sharma; 5 October 1867; Benaras, British India (present-day Uttar Pradesh, India)
- Died: December 1923 (aged 56)
- Notable work: Bir Charitra
- Children: 13
- Parent(s): Ganga Nath (father); Bagishowri (mother)

Yadunath Sharma, popularly known as Girish Ballabh Joshi (1867–1923) was a Nepali Ayurvedic doctor (kabiraj) and novelist. He is considered to be the first Nepali novelist. His novel Bir Charitra was first published in 1903.

== Early life ==
He was born on 5 October 1867 (19 Ashoj 1924 BS) to father Ganga Nath and mother Bagishowri. The place of his birth is disputed, some sources claim it was in Kathmandu, while other claims, it was in Varanasi or Mathura city of India. It is believed his parents were on a pilgrimage in India, around his birth. He grew up in Mathura and Varanasi. His family served as the royal Baidhya (Ayurvedic practitioner). He studied Ayurveda in Varanasi. After the death of his father, he returned to Kathmandu.

== Literary career ==
Although, he had not received any education in literar field, he was interested in literature. He was proficient in Hindi and Urdu alongside Nepali. He was an ardent fan of Devaki Nandan Khatri, an Indian writer. His novels influenced him to write Bir Charitra, a fantasy detective novel.

== Bibliography ==
Novels

- Bir Charitra (1903)
- Bahadur Charitra
- Prarabdha Darpan
- Chandrakala Adityasen
- Girishbani (Hindi novel)

Plays

- Sitaram Milap (Hindi)
- Pashupati Sabha
- Satyanag Chitra
- Golokarchitra

Other

- Ishwar Tatva Bibek
- Patanjal Yogsutrako Bhasya (Sanskrit)
- Bibhinna Dev Deviko Stuti Padhya (Sanskrit)

== Personal life and death ==
He had 13 children (7 daughters and 6 sons). He died in December 1923 (Poush 1980).
