= Joseph Perl =

German-Jewish novelist, religious commentator, and proponent of the Haskalah

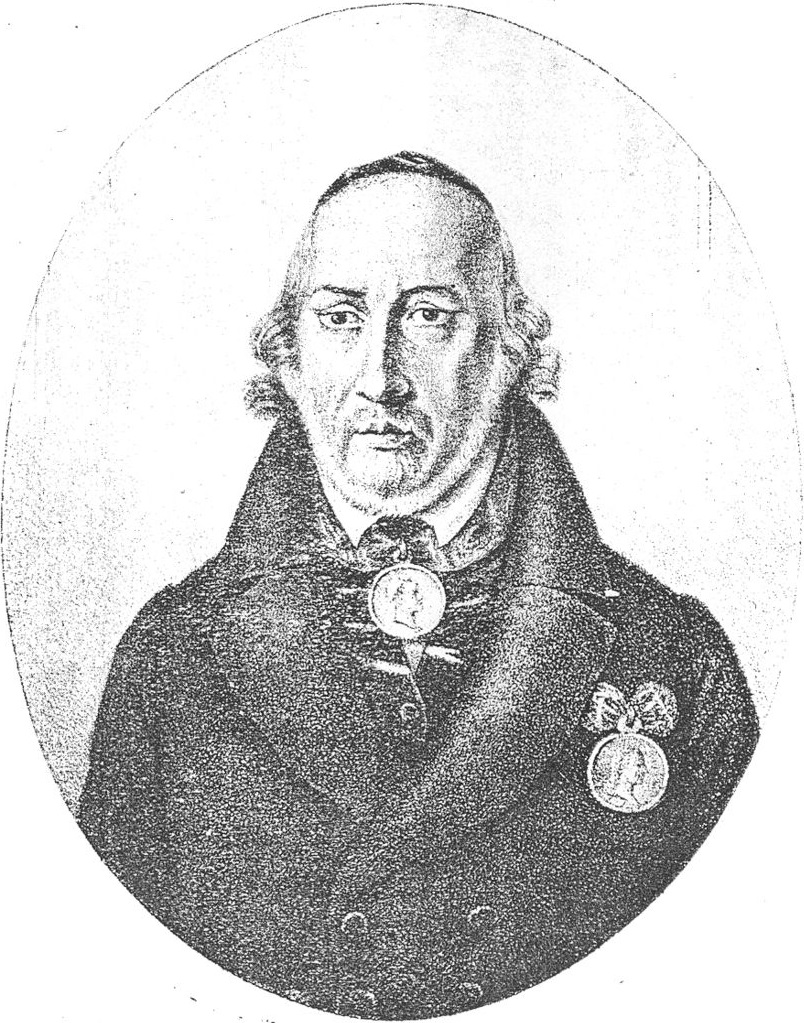
Joseph Perl, with medals awarded for his work in education

Joseph Perl (also Josef Perl; November 10, 1773, in Ternopil – October 1, 1839, in Ternopil), was an Ashkenazi Jewish educator and writer, a scion of the Haskalah or Jewish Enlightenment. He wrote in Hebrew, Yiddish, and German; in 1819, he published the first Hebrew novel. Born and raised in the Austrian province of Galicia shortly after its annexation in the first partition of Poland, he was a follower of Hasidism in his youth. Later, he turned against Hasidism and became a proponent of Jewish emancipation and Haskalah, although he remained an observant Jew. He is best known for his many writings on Hasidism, ranging from critical treatises to parody.

== Youthful publisher ==
In 1786, only 13 years old (This needs verification, as Mahler (in Hasidim and The Jewish Enlightenment p 125) dates this to 1816. Similarly, in the Hebrew Wikipedia page, it says that Perl married at 14 and had a positive interest in Hasidut), he wrote a book in German, Ueber das Wesen der Sekte Chassidim aus ihren eigenen Schriften gezogen (On the Nature of the Sect of the Hasidim, Drawn from Their Own Writings), in which he attempted to demonstrate the absurdity of the beliefs and practices of Hasidic rabbis, including Rabbi Nachman of Bratslav and Rabbi Shneur Zalman, founder of what became the Lubavitcher movement. His work was rejected by the imperial censors, who apparently feared that it would create disharmony among Austria's Jewish subjects. It was published in 1816. At the age of 14, he was engaged by his parents, but he continued living in his father's home.

He studied Kabala and Hasidut, but his father, who was opposed to these studies, made him a merchant. This deeply affected his opinions regarding various subjects. Perl's satire of the Hasidic movement, Revealer of Secrets (Megalleh Temirim), is said to be the first modern novel in Hebrew. It was published in Vienna in 1819 under the pseudonym "Obadiah ben Pethahiah". Structured as an epistolary novel, it is currently in print only in an English translation, by Dov Taylor, published by Westview Press. It is an unusual book in that it satirizes the language and style of early Hasidic rabbis writing in Hebrew, which was not the vernacular of the Jews of its time. To make his work available and accessible to his contemporaries, Perl translated his own work into Yiddish. A subsequent parody of Hasidic writings, Words of the Righteous, written with Isaac Baer Levinsohn and published in 1830, is available in Hebrew.

== Educator and informer ==
According to Dov Taylor, in his introduction to his English translation of Revealer of Secrets, Perl denounced Hasidism not only in his writing but in memoranda to representatives of the Austrian Empire. On March 22, 1838, Perl wrote a letter suggesting that the government censor Jewish libraries, prohibit meetings in mikvehs and close cheders and yeshivas, which he called "a place of refuge for vagabonds, thieves… a nest of demoralization and of… nefarious, scandalous deeds." In certain memoranda written in later years Perl went so far as to attack particular Hasidic rebbes by name. For that he earned the name Joseph the "Malshin" (Informer) in the Hasidic world.

As an educator, he was a founder of the Deutsch-Israelitische Hauptschule, a school for Jewish children which taught secular subjects such as history, geography, mathematics, and natural science in German, in addition to the Bible and Talmud.

== Death ==
Joseph Perl, who ridiculed the ecstatic dancing and singing of the Hasidim, died on Simchat Torah (a holiday known in English as "rejoicing in the Torah"), a holy day traditionally — and currently — celebrated by song, dance and a processional through the streets carrying Torah scrolls, so the Galician Hasidim did not miss the opportunity to dance on Perl's fresh grave immediately after his burial.

== Sources ==
- |The First Hebrew Novel: Joseph Perl's Revealer of Secrets, at National Yiddish Book Center. Review by Hillel Halkin.
- Ken Frieden. "Joseph Perl's Escape from Biblical Epigonism through Parody of Hasidic Writing," AJS Review 29 (2005): 265-82.
- Jewish Encyclopedia entry
- Jonatan Meir. Divrei Saddiqim (דברי צדיקים). Words of the Righteous: An Anti-Hasidic Satire by Joseph Perl and Isaac Baer Levinsohn. Sources and Studies in the Literature of Jewish Mysticism 12, 2004, 180 pages, ISBN 0-9747505-7-3
- Jonatan Meir. Imagined Hasidism: The Anti-Hasidic Writings of Joseph Perl, Jerusalem: Mossad Bialik 2013
- Joseph Perl, Sefer Megale Temirin, critically edited and introduced by Jonatan Meir, Jerusalem: Mossad Bialik, 2 volumes, 2013
- Jonatan Meir. ‘Marketing Demons: Joseph Perl, Israel Baal Shem Tov and the History of One Amulet’, Kabbalah: Journal for the Study of Jewish Mystical Texts 28 (2012), pp. 35–66
- Allan Nadler. "New Book Reveals Darker Chapters In Hasidic History." Jewish Forward. Fri. Aug 25, 2006
- Nancy Sinkoff, "The Maskil, The Convert, and the Agunah: Joseph Perl as a Historian of Jewish Divorce Law," AJS Review 27 (2003), 281–300.
- Dov Taylor. Joseph Perl's Revealer of Secrets: The First Hebrew Novel. Westview Press. Boulder, Colorado. 1997. Translation with notes, commentary, and introductory materials. ISBN 0-8133-3212-5
- Dov Taylor. Sound an Alarm! Joseph Perl's Revealer of Secrets and Testing the Righteous. Translation, notes, and introductory materials [Volume 1: Commentary; Volume 2: The Novels]. Hebrew Union College Press. 2024. ISBN 9780878208012
- Who Was Joseph Perl? by Dr. Henry Abramson
