= Dézafi =

1975 Haitian novel

- Cover of the 2018 English Translation
- Author: Frankétienne
- Translator: Asselin Charles
- Cover artist: Frankétienne
- Language: Haitian Creole
- Genre: Fiction/Caribbean Literature
- Publisher: Port-au-Prince: Editions Fardin (Haitian 1st ed.); Charlottesville: University of Virginia Press (English 1st. ed)
- Publication date: 1975
- Publication place: Haiti
- English publication date: 2018
- ISBN: 978-0-8139-4139-4

Dézafi by Frankétienne is the first novel to be written and published in Haitian Creole. Released in 1975, it has since been translated into both English and French and received a number of awards including the Best Translated Book Award of 2019.

Dézafi (which means 'cock fight' in Haitian Creole) is set in Haiti and centers around a voodoo priest, Sintil, who is terrorizing the village of Bouanèf and enslaving residents by turning them into zonbis. The book ends when the zonbis wake up and rile the populace into overthrowing Sintil, ripping him to pieces.

Written with a subtle plot line, most of Dézafi is written in an abstract style that captures the Haitian experience without directly communicating storyline. This structure is a function of the spiralist movement which Frankétienne belonged to.

== Plot ==
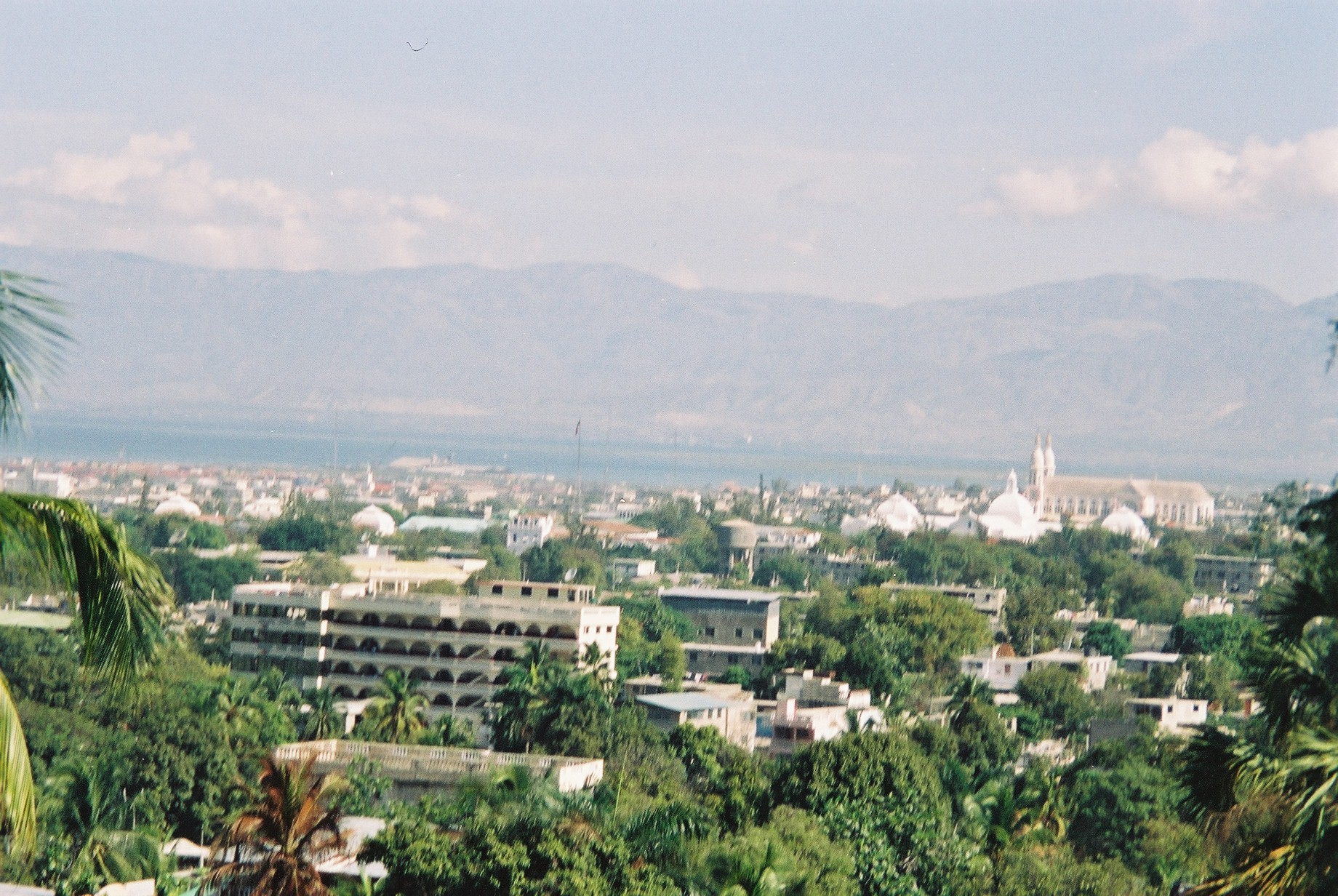
Port-au-Prince, the capital of Haiti, where portions of Dézafi are set.

Dézafi mostly takes place in the rural Haitian village of Bouanèf but there are some scenes in Port-au-Prince. The core storyline focuses on a plantation owned by Sintil, the local oungan (vodou priest), and run by zonbis. The zonbis, humans brought back to life from a death-like state by an oungan to work, are essentially slaves. They cannot speak, cannot think, and have no more cognitive function than is required to work the plantation.

Sintil controls the zonbis with the help of his daughter Siltana and a hired man named Zofè. Sintil frequently reminds Siltana that she must remember to never give the zonbis salt because if they taste it they will wake up. At the beginning of the book Siltana is happy to follow her father's directives. However, when a new zonbi named Klodonis is brought to the plantation she falls in love with him and loses interest in her normal duties on the ranch. She is devastated by the fact that Klodonis is in a permanent stupor and cannot reciprocate her feelings. Her frustration builds throughout the book until at last in desperation she gives Klodonis salt and restores him to being fully human. Unfortunately, far from being in love with her, Klodonis knocks her to the ground and immediately revives the rest of the zonbis, launching a rebellion against Sintil which eventually spreads to the village and culminates in Sintil's bloody demise.

The majority of the main plotline happens in the very end of the book. There are, however, several smaller plotlines sprinkled throughout Dézafi, which focus on other villagers in Bouanèf and how their lives are affected by Sintil's presence. Jéròm, for example, is a villager who hides in his brother's attic for almost the entirety of the book out of fear of Sintil. Another character, Gaston, uses his winnings from a lucky day at gambling to travel to Port-au-Prince. Unfortunately, once there he cannot earn enough money to make a stable living and languishes on the streets for years before attempting to return to Bouanèf just as the revolution is taking place. However, when he sees the chaotic revolution occurring in the village he turns around and walks back towards Port-au-Prince. Still another villager, Jédéyon, lives alone in an old house with his niece Rita. Jédéyon has been abandoned by his wife and family who left for the United States without him and he constantly berates and chastises Rita, who takes care of him and the house. He dies before the rebellion.

There is an additional abstract plotline which centers on a series of cock fight (dézafis, in Haitian). When Sintil is at last apprehended and killed it is at one of these cock fights.

== Structure ==
Due to its spiralist influences, Dézafi is unconventional in structure and formatting. It follows a spiral-like structure, in which the narrative bends back to where it began with multiple repetitions and reiterations of points and details. The main story progresses on and up, building to the climax with numerous other voices and perspectives included to build the sense that the whole narrative reality is collective and exists both objectively and subjectively.

The original 1975 includes three types of text: italics, bold with forward slashes, and indented standard roman type. These three different formats are interwoven throughout the text, such that a single page might have portions of each.

The standard roman type is used predominantly for the plot and concrete experiences of the characters, but it accounts for less than half of the text of Dézafi. The rest is written in either italics or bold and does not relate directly to the plotline of the book, but rather has a more poetic and abstract significance with regards to Haitian culture. Frequently these sections are related to the titular dézafi (cock fight) and they are often narrated in first person plural.

In the later 2002 edition of the book many more font sizes and typefaces were added beyond the original three, in addition to other changes relating to spelling and formatting.

== Political Message ==
In Dézafi Sintil and his cronies are a veiled allegory for the Duvalier regime which ruled Haiti at the time when Dézafi was written. The zonbis in Dézafi are meant to represent Haitians living under the Duvalier regime. Frankétienne was hinting that the Duvalier regime could be overturned through an uprising of the populace of Haiti, just as Sintil was only overthrown when the zonbis finally woke up and exacted their vengeance. And as Sintil was only overthrown once the zonbis had their humanity restored, Frankétienne implies that an uprising can only take place once the people of Haiti awaken from their subservient stupor.

Unfortunately, at the time of Dézafi's publication much of Haiti was illiterate and thus could not access Frankétienne's message. Only 20% of Haitians could read, and many of that number were against the idea of writing in Creole, preferring French. Therefore, the general public of Haiti was not able to read Dézafi and Frankétienne's attempt to call the people to revolt against the Duvalier regime fell on deaf ears. For this reason he later switched to writing plays, which the ordinary citizen could access. This decision irritated the Duvalier regime.

== Legacy ==
Dézafi is widely seen as an influential piece of Haitian literature. Frankétienne was named an Artist for Peace by UNESCO in 2010 after he "predicted" the devastating 2010 Haitian earthquake with his 2009 play Melovivi or Le Piège. He was also a recipient of France's Order of Letters and a past Nobel candidate.

The 2018 English translation received a number of awards including Best Translated Book Award of 2019 and an honorable mention for Lois Roth Award for a Translation of a Literary Work.
