= Difficile émergence vers la lumière =

2011 painting by Frankétienne

- English: Difficult emergence into the Light
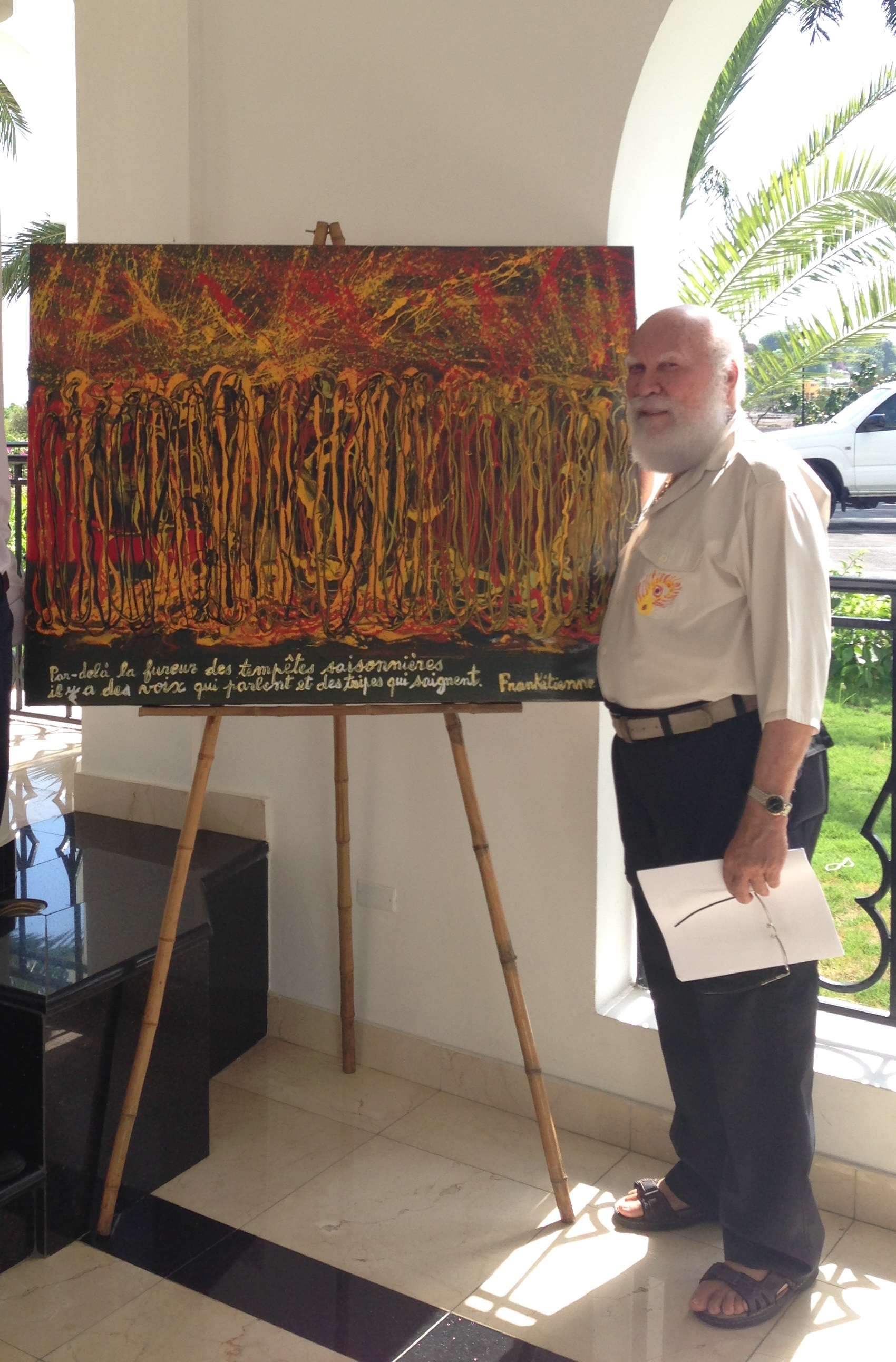
- Artist: Frankétienne
- Year: c. 2011
- Type: Oil on toile
- Dimensions: 76 cm × 122 cm (30 in × 48 in)

Difficile émergence vers la lumière (Difficult emergence into the Light) is an artwork by Haitian artist Frankétienne created on 2011, and represents the victims of the Hurricanes that usually lash this region, and their effort to reach the Light.

It was shown to the public for the last time during the exposition "Pour la memoire et la lumière" ("For memory and light") promoted by the foundation Ayiti Bel at the Hotel NH Haiti El Rancho, in Pétion-Ville, Haití, between April 11 and April 25, 2014.

Later, it was acquired by a private collector.,

On the bottom of the artwork, the artist wrote before his signature: "Par-delà la fureur des tempêtes saisonnières il y a des voix qui parlent et des tripes que saignent." It can be translated as "Beyond the rage of seasonal storms there are voices that speak and bleeding guts."
