= Council of International Fellowship =

The Council of International Fellowship (CIF) is a worldwide organisation to provide possibilities for inservice training and the exchange of professional experiences in the field of Social Work.

Henry. B. Ollendorff born in Germany, was sent to Germany to participate in the re-education program of the U.S. government. In 1954 he conducted courses for youth leaders and social workers in Hesse. Working with these young people made him think to start an exchange program. His plan was approved by the German Ministry of Youth and also the German Fulbright Commission. The first German participants went to Cleveland, Ohio. In 1956 the "Cleveland International Program - CIP" (later "Council of International Programs") was founded.

1958 followed the German exchange program - and started with the invitation of American social workers.

CIF was founded 1960 in Hamburg, Germany. It is registered in Bonn, Germany. Now the organisation has exchange programs in different parts of the world (United States, India, Western European countries, etc.).

Beside the exchange programs there are international conferences (2003 in Goa, India, 2005 in Bonn, Germany, 2007 in Cleveland, Ohio, 2009 in Finland, 2011 in Cyprus, and 2013 in Ankara, Turkey).
