= Ollendorff =

Ollendorff is a surname. Notable people with the surname include:

- Franz Ollendorff (1900–1981), Israeli physicist
- Heinrich Gottfried Ollendorff (1803–1865), German grammarian and language educator
- Henry B. Ollendorff (1907–1979), German-born US social worker
- Paul Ollendorff (1851–1920), French publisher
