= Ken Frieden =

- Born: 1955 (age 70–71); New Rochelle, New York, U.S.
- Citizenship: American
- Occupations: Scholar, Editor
- Awards: Lady Davis Post-Doctoral Fellow; Yad Hanadiv Fellowship

Academic background
- Education: Yale University
- Thesis: Genius and Monologue

Academic work
- Discipline: Judaic Studies, comparative literature, english, religion
- Sub-discipline: Hebrew and Yiddish literature, literary Theory, interpretation (Freudian and Rabbinic)
- Institutions: Emory University; Syracuse University

Ken Frieden (in Hebrew: יעקב זיו (קן) פרידן; born 1955) is the B.G. Rudolph Professor of Judaic Studies— and a full professor in the Departments of English, Languages, Literatures, and Linguistics, and Religion — at Syracuse University. He writes about, edits, and promotes Hebrew, Yiddish, and other Jewish literature.

== Early life and education ==
Born in New Rochelle, New York, he received a B.A. from Yale University in 1977, and went on to complete a Ph.D. in Comparative Literature there in 1984. At Yale he studied with Harold Bloom, Jacques Derrida, Geoffrey Hartman, Paul de Man, and J. Hillis Miller. Based on his dissertation, his first book was Genius and Monologue. The book used key-word analysis of “genius” to show how intellectual history parallels literary history. Frieden’s second book, Freud’s Dream of Interpretation, juxtaposed Freudian interpretation and medieval rabbinic interpretation, arguing that in spite of marked similarities, Freud made efforts to deflect attention from this.

From 1985 to 1986, Frieden was a Lady Davis Post-Doctoral Fellow in Jerusalem. During that time he studied Yiddish and Hebrew literature with Khone Shmeruk and Dan Miron at the Hebrew University. While teaching at Emory University (1986–1993), Frieden focused his research and teaching on twentieth-century Hebrew literature and nineteenth-century Yiddish fiction. He held a Yad Hanadiv Fellowship in Jerusalem (1988–1989), working closely with Aharon Appelfeld and James Young. While at Emory he published numerous articles and received tenure and promotion to associate professor in 1990.

== Career ==
Frieden was hired by Syracuse University in 1993. Since then he has published and edited several books. His comprehensive study Classic Yiddish Fiction (1995) surveys the three major authors S. Y. Abramovitsh, Sholem Aleichem, and I. L. Peretz. Collaborating with Dan Miron, he edited Tales of Mendele the Book Peddler, later reprinted by Random House. Collaborating with Ted Gorelick, he edited a new English translation of Sholem Aleichem's monologues, published as Nineteen to the Dozen. With a secondary interest in Israeli art, he commissioned the jacket cover print, "The World of Sholem Aleichem," from the Russian-Israeli artist Boris Luchanski.

Frieden arrived in Syracuse during the same year that Robert Mandel became director of Syracuse University Press. They created the series Judaic Traditions in Literature, Music, and Art, which has produced more than 50 volumes at the Press. Frieden edited the anthology Classic Yiddish Stories of S. Y. Abramovitsh, Sholem Aleichem, and I. L. Peretz, including his own translations of Abramovitsh and Peretz, Ted Gorelick's translations of Sholem Aleichem's monologues, and Michael Wex's translations of Sholem Aleichem's Tevye stories. His influence has been felt in many other books on Yiddish and Hebrew literary culture he has edited. Recently he edited collections of Hebrew short stories in English translation by Etgar Keret and David Ehrlich.

Frieden has traveled repeatedly in Eastern Europe to explore the remnants of Jewish culture there, particularly in Lithuania, Ukraine, and Poland. He has been a visiting professor or research fellow at the universities in Tel Aviv, Haifa, Jerusalem, Berlin, and Heidelberg; also stateside at University of California, Davis and Harvard.

Frieden’s most recent research shows the significance of travel narratives in Hebrew literature, at the fault line between the Enlightenment and Hasidism.

== Personal life ==
He is also active as a Klezmer clarinetist, having founded “The Wandering Klezmorim” in Atlanta in 1991. He often performs with “The Wandering Klezmorim” and “Klezmercuse” at festive events in Central New York.

== Publications ==
=== Books ===
- Travels in Translation: Sea Tales at the Source of Jewish Fiction. Syracuse, NY: Syracuse University Press, 2016. ISBN 9780815634416
- Classic Yiddish fiction: Abramovitsh, Sholem Aleichem, and Peretz. Albany, NY: State University of New York Press, 1995. ISBN 9780791426012
- Freud's Dream of Interpretation. Albany, NY: State University of New York Press, 1990. ISBN 9780791401248
- Genius and Monologue. Ithaca, NY: Cornell University Press, 1989. ISBN 9780801418044. Full text available online

=== Selected articles in periodicals ===
- "Neglected Origins of Modern Hebrew Prose: Hasidic and Maskilic Travel Narratives," AJS Review: The Journal of the Association for Jewish Studies 33 (2009): 3-43.
- "Epigonism After Abramovitsh and Bialik," Studia Rosenthaliana 40 (Amsterdam, 2007–2008): 159-181.
- “‘Nusah Mendele’ be-mabat bikorti" [in Hebrew; A Critical Perspective on "Mendele's Nusah "], Dappim le-mehkar be-sifrut [Research on Literature, Haifa] 14-15 (2006): 89-103.
- "Joseph Perl's Escape From Biblical Epigonism through Parody of Hasidic Writing," AJS Review: The Journal of the Association for Jewish Studies 29 (2005): 265-82.
- "The Displacement of Jewish Identity in Stefan Zweig's "Buchmendel" Symposium 52 (Winter 199): 232-39.
- Parody and Hagiography in I. L. Peretz's Neo-Hasidic Stories (in Hebrew) Parodia ve-hagiographia: sippurim hasidiim-keveyakhol shel I. L. Peretz. [in Hebrew; "Parody and Hagiography: Peretz’s 'As-If' Hasidic Stories"], Chulyot [Journal of Research on Yiddish Literature and Its Relationships to Hebrew Literature, Haifa] 7 (2002): 45-52.
- "A Century in the Life of Sholem Aleichem's Tevye " A Century in the Life of Sholem Aleichem's Tevye," The B. G. Rudolph Lectures in Judaic Studies, New Series, Lecture 1 [1993-94] (Syracuse University Press, 1997), 26pp.
- "New(s) Poems: Y. L. Teller's Lider fun der tsayt(ung)," AJS Review: The Journal of the Association for Jewish Studies 15 (1990; 269-89.
- "Psychological Depth in I. L. Peretz' Familiar Scenes," Jewish Book Annual 47 (1989–90): 145-51.
- "Sholem Aleichem: Monologues of Mastery," Modern Language Studies 19 (1989): 25-37.
- "I. B. Singer's Monlogues Demons," Prooftexts: A Journal of Jewish Literary History 5 (1985): 263-68.
- "Stefan Zweig and the Nazis," A Jewish Journal at Yale 1 (1983): 39-41.

=== Selected articles in edited volumes ===
- "The Suppression of Yiddish among Hasidim and their Opponents," in the annual Yiddish Symposium Publication, Between Yiddish and Hebrew, ed. Shlomo Berger (Amsterdam: Menasseh ben Israel Institute for Jewish Social and Cultural Studies, 2013), 37-53.
- "Yiddish in Abramovitsh's Literary Revival of Hebrew," in Leket: Jiddistik heute / Yiddish Studies Today / yidishe shtudtyes haynt, ed. Marion Aptroot, Efrat Gal-Ed, Roland Gruschka, and Simon Neuberg (Düsseldorf: Düsseldorf University Press, 2012): 173-188
- "Innovation by Translation in Yiddish Literary History ", in Arguing the Modern Jewish Canon: Essays on Literature and Culture in Honor of Ruth R. Wisse, ed. Justin Cammy, Dara Horn, et al. (Center for Jewish Studies and Harvard University Press, 2008): 417-425.
- Entry on S. Y. Abramovitsh for the Dictionary of Literary Biography, volume 333: Writers in Yiddish, ed. Joseph Sherman (Farmington Hills, MI: Thomson Gale, 2007): 180-187.
- “Tradition and Innovation: How Peretz Made Literary History,” in The Enduring Legacy of Yitzchok Leybush Peretz, ed. Benny Kraut (Flushing, New York: Queens College, 2006): 49-61.
- Yiddish Literature (Encyclopædia Britannica Article) “Yiddish Literature” entry (ca. 12,000 words) in the online and CD-ROM version of EncyclopaediaBritannica (2004), also included in the 16th print edition.
