= Pradel Pompilus =

Haitian writer

Pradel Pompilus (1914–2000) was a Haitian writer. Pompilus "is considered one of the most respected Haitian scholars." He is best known for his three-volume study of Haitian literature.
