= Henry B. Ollendorff =

German-Jewish social worker

Henry Bernard Ollendorff
- Born: Heinz Bernard Ollendorff; March 14, 1907; Esslingen am Neckar, German Empire
- Died: February 10, 1979; Cleveland, Ohio, United States
- Education: Heidelberg University
- Occupation: Social worker
- Known for: Founder of the Council of International Fellowship
- Spouse: Martha Ollendorff

Henry Bernard Ollendorff (March 14, 1907 – February 10, 1979) was a German-Jewish social worker.

== Biography ==
He was born as Heinz Bernard Ollendorff to an oculist in the town of Esslingen am Neckar, Germany. He grew up in the city of Darmstadt. He received his doctor's degree in law from the University of Heidelberg. The discrimination laws of Nazi Germany severely hindered him in his work and he even had to spend 13 months in prison before he emigrated together with his wife Martha to the United States, in 1938.

In Cleveland, Ohio he studied social work. In 1954, the US Department of State asked him to participate in the re-education programme for Germans and he conducted courses for youth leaders and social workers in Hesse. He also had the idea to start an exchange program. Now the Council of International Fellowship is a world wide organisation for professionals working in the field of social work.

Ollendorff died in Cleveland, Ohio.

== Legacy ==
In 2007, the German city of Darmstadt gave his name to a square.
