= Kabiraj =

Kabiraj (Note: Also spelled Kobiraj or Kaviraj; Bengali: কবিরাজ, romanized: Kôbirāj Assamese: কবিৰাজ, romanized: Kôbirāz Odia: କବିରାଜ, romanized: Kabirāj Magahi: कबिराज, romanized: Kabirāj Nepali: कविराज, romanized: Kāvirāj) is an occupational title found in persons of eastern Indian subcontinent. In older days, people traditionally practising Ayurveda were generally called kabi in the eastern Indian Subcontinent.

Many of them were attached to royal courts to treat kings and the royal family. As such they were given the title of Kabiraj ("King Kabi", compare Raj Vaidya used elsewhere). The descendants of such persons started using "Kabiraj" as a surname. This surname is often found in persons originating from Bangladesh and Indian states of Assam, Bihar, Odisha and West Bengal.

== See also ==
- Kaviraj, similar sounding title but etymologically different
- Vaidya
