= Haskalah =

1770s–1880s Jewish intellectual movement

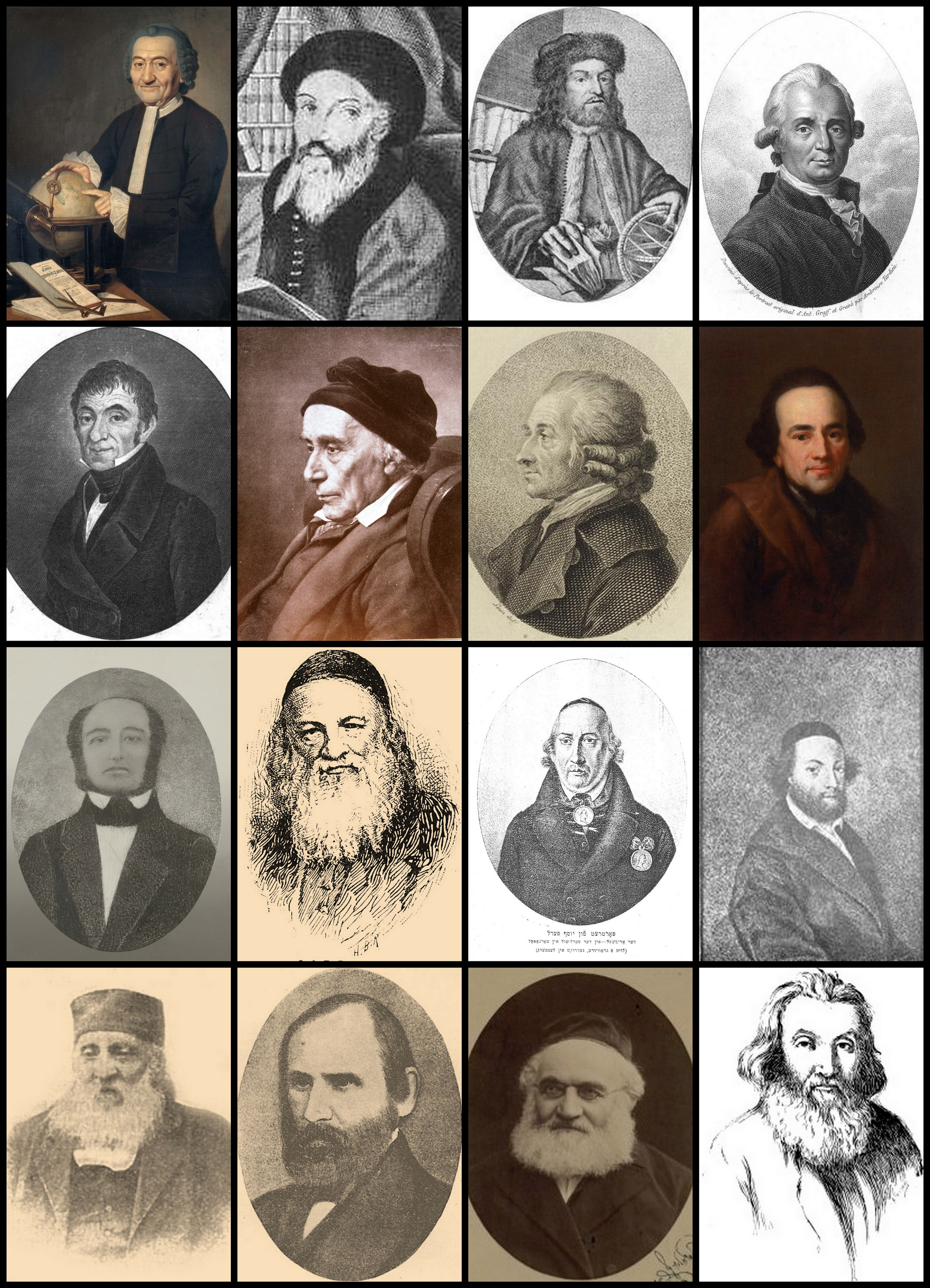
Top row, proto-Maskilim: Raphael Levi Hannover • Solomon Dubno • Tobias Cohn • Marcus Elieser Bloch 2nd row, Berlin Haskalah: Salomon Jacob Cohen • David Friedländer • Naphtali Hirz Wessely • Moses Mendelssohn 3rd row, Austria and Galicia: Judah Löb Mieses • Solomon Judah Loeb Rapoport • Joseph Perl • Baruch Jeitteles Bottom row, Russia: Avrom Ber Gotlober • Abraham Mapu • Samuel Joseph Fuenn • Isaac Baer Levinsohn

The Haskalah (Hebrew: הַשְׂכָּלָה, literally, "wisdom", "erudition" or "education"), often termed the Jewish Enlightenment, was an intellectual movement among the Jews of Central and Eastern Europe, with a certain influence on those in Western Europe and the Muslim world. It arose as a defined ideological worldview during the 1770s, as its proponents (the Maskilim) engaged with the philosophical and scientific ideas of the broader Age of Enlightenment. Its last stage ended at the close of the 19th century, following an increase in antisemitic violence culminating in the 1881 pogroms in Imperial Russia, which caused many adherents of the Haskalah to turn towards proto-Zionist groups like Hibbat Zion as a means to achieve Jewish emancipation.

The movement advocated against Jewish parochialism and encouraged the adoption of prevailing attire over traditional dress, while also working to diminish the authority of traditional community institutions such as rabbinic courts and boards of elders. It pursued a set of projects of cultural and moral renewal, including a revival of Hebrew for use in secular life, which resulted in an increase in Hebrew found in print. Concurrently, it strove for an optimal integration in surrounding societies. Practitioners promoted the study of exogenous culture, style and language as well as the adoption of modern values. At the same time, economic production, and the taking up of new occupations was pursued. The Haskalah promoted rationalism, romanticism, liberalism, and enquiry, and is largely perceived as the Jewish variant of the general Age of Enlightenment. The movement encompassed a wide spectrum ranging from moderates, who hoped for maximal compromise, to radicals, who sought sweeping changes.

In its various changes, the Haskalah fulfilled an important, though limited, part in the modernization of Central and Eastern European Jews. Its activists, the Maskilim, exhorted and implemented communal, educational and cultural reforms in both the public and the private spheres. Owing to its dual policies, it collided both with the traditionalist rabbinic elite, which attempted to preserve old Jewish values and norms in their entirety, and with the radical assimilationists who wished to eliminate or minimize the existence of the Jews as a defined collective.

== Definitions ==
=== Literary circle ===
The Haskalah was multifaceted, with many loci which became more and less prominent at different times and across vast territories. The name Haskalah became a standard self-appellation in 1860, when it was taken as the motto of the Odessa-based newspaper Ha-Melitz, but derivatives and the title Maskil for activists were already common in the first edition of Ha-Meassef from 1 October 1783: its publishers described themselves as Maskilim. Ha-Meassif was a quarterly started in Koenigsberg by students of the prominent Haskalah philosopher Moses Mendelssohn and was considered the first Hebrew periodical of the Haskalah in Germany. While Maskilic centres sometimes had loose institutions around which their members operated, the movement as a whole lacked any such.

In spite of that diversity, the Maskilim shared a sense of common identity and self-consciousness. They were anchored in the existence of a shared literary canon, which began to be formulated in the first Maskilic locus at Berlin. Its members, like Moses Mendelssohn, Naphtali Hirz Wessely, Isaac Satanow and Isaac Euchel, authored tracts in various genres that were further disseminated and re-read among other Maskilim. Each generation, in turn, elaborated and added its own works to the growing body. The emergence of the Maskilic canon reflected the movement's central and defining enterprise, the revival of Hebrew as a literary language for secular purposes (its restoration as a spoken tongue occurred only much later). The Maskilim researched and standardized grammar, minted countless neologisms and composed poetry, magazines, theatrical works and literature of all sorts in Hebrew. Historians described the movement largely as a Republic of Letters, an intellectual community based on printing houses and reading societies.

The Maskilim's attitude toward Hebrew, as noted by Moses Pelli, was derived from Enlightenment perceptions of language as reflecting both individual and collective character. To them, a corrupt tongue mirrored the inadequate condition of the Jews which they sought to ameliorate. They turned to Hebrew as their primary creative medium. The Maskilim inherited the Medieval Grammarians' – such as Jonah ibn Janah and Judah ben David Hayyuj – distaste of Mishnaic Hebrew and preference of the Biblical one as pristine and correct. They turned to the Bible as a source and standard, emphatically advocating what they termed "Pure Hebrew Tongue" (S'fat E'ver tzacha) and lambasting the Rabbinic style of letters, which mixed it with Aramaic as a single "Holy Tongue" and often employed loanwords from other languages. Some activists, however, were not averse to using Mishnaic and Rabbinic forms. They also preferred the Sephardi pronunciation, considered more prestigious, to the Ashkenazi one, which was linked with the Jews of Poland, who were deemed backward. The movement's literary canon is defined by a grandiloquent, archaic register copying the Biblical one and often combining lengthy allusions or direct quotes from verses in the prose.

During a century of activity, the Maskilim produced a massive contribution, forming the first phase of modern Hebrew literature. In 1755, Moses Mendelssohn began publishing Qohelet Musar "The Moralist", regarded as the beginning of modern writing in Hebrew and the first journal in the language. Between 1789 and his death, Naphtali Hirz Wessely compiled Shirei Tif'eret "Poems of Glory", an eighteen-part epic cycle concerning Moses that exerted influence on all neo-Hebraic poets in the following generations. Joseph ha-Efrati Troplowitz was the Haskalah's pioneering playwright, best known for his 1794 epic drama Melukhat Sha'ul "Reign of Saul", which was printed in twelve editions by 1888. Judah Leib Ben-Ze'ev was the first modern Hebrew grammarian, and beginning with his 1796 manual of the language, he authored books which explored it and were vital reading material for young Maskilim until the end of the 19th century. Solomon Löwisohn was the first to translate Shakespeare into Hebrew, and an abridged form of the "Are at this hour asleep!" monologue in Henry IV, Part 2 was included in his 1816 lyrical compilation Melitzat Yeshurun (Eloquence of Jeshurun).

Joseph Perl pioneered satirist writings in his biting, mocking critique of Hasidic Judaism, Megaleh Tmirin "Revealer of Secrets" from 1819. Avraham Dov Ber Lebensohn was primarily a leading metricist, with his 1842 Shirei S'fat haQodesh "Verses in the Holy Tongue" considered a milestone in Hebrew poetry, and also authored biblical exegesis and educational handbooks. Abraham Mapu authored the first Hebrew full-length novel, Ahavat Zion "Love of Zion", which was published in 1853 after twenty-three years of work. Judah Leib Gordon was the most eminent poet of his generation and arguably of the Haskalah in its entirety. His most famous work was the 1876 epic Qotzo shel Yodh (Tittle of a Jot). Mendele Mocher Sforim was during his youth a Maskilic writer but from his 1886 Beseter ra'am (Hebrew: בסתר רעם), (Note: "Beseter ra'am" is a allusion to an expression in Psalms 81:7 variously translated as "in the secret place of thunder", "hidden in thunder", etc.) (Hidden in Thunder), he abandoned its strict conventions in favour of a mixed, facile and common style. His career marked the end of the Maskilic period in Hebrew literature and the beginning of the Era of Renaissance. The writers of the latter period lambasted their Maskilic predecessors for their didactic and florid style, more or less paralleling the Romantics' criticism of Enlightenment literature.

The central platforms of the Maskilic "Republic of Letters" were its great periodicals, each serving as a locus for contributors and readers during the time it was published. The first was the Königsberg (and later Berlin)-based Ha-Meassef, launched by Isaac Abraham Euchel in 1783 and printed with growing intervals until 1797. The magazine had several dozen writers and 272 subscribers at its zenith, from Shklow in the east to London in the west, making it the sounding board of the Berlin Haskalah. The movement lacked an equivalent until the appearance of Bikurei ha-I'tim in Vienna between 1820 until 1831, serving the Moravian and Galician Haskalah. That function was later fulfilled by the Prague-based Kerem Hemed from 1834 to 1857, and to a lesser degree by Kokhvei Yizhak, published in the same city from 1845 to 1870. The Russian Haskalah was robust enough to lack any single platform. Its members published several large magazines, including the Vilnius-based Ha-Karmel (1860–1880), Ha-Tsefirah in Warsaw and more, though the probably most influential of them all was Ha-Melitz, launched in 1860 at Odessa by Aleksander Zederbaum.

=== Reforming movement ===
While the partisans of the Haskalah were much immersed in the study of sciences and Hebrew grammar, this was not a profoundly new phenomenon, and their creativity was a continuation of a long, centuries-old trend among educated Jews. What truly marked the movement was the challenge it laid to the monopoly of the rabbinic elite over the intellectual sphere of Jewish life, contesting its role as spiritual leadership. In his 1782 circular Divrei Shalom v'Emeth (Words of Peace and Truth), Hartwig Wessely, one of the most traditional and moderate maskilim, quoted the passage from Leviticus Rabbah stating that a Torah scholar who lacked wisdom was inferior to an animal's carcass. He called upon the Jews to introduce general subjects, like science and vernacular language, into their children's curriculum; this "Teaching of Man" was necessarily linked with the "Teaching (Torah) of God", and the latter, though superior, could not be pursued and was useless without the former.

Historian Shmuel Feiner discerned that Wessely insinuated (consciously or not) a direct challenge to the supremacy of sacred teachings, comparing them with general subjects and implying the latter had an intrinsic rather than merely instrumental value. He therefore also contested the authority of the rabbinical establishment, which stemmed from its function as interpreters of the holy teachings and their status as the only truly worthy field of study. Though secular subjects could be and were easily tolerated, their elevation to the same level as sacred ones was a severe threat, and indeed mobilized the rabbis against the nascent Haskalah. The potential of "Words of Peace and Truth" was fully realized later, by the second generation of the movement in Berlin and other radical maskilim, who openly and vehemently denounced the traditional authorities. The appropriate intellectual and moral leadership needed by the Jewish public in modern times was, according to the maskilim, that of their own. Feiner noted that in their usurpation of the title of spiritual elite, unprecedented in Jewish history since the dawn of Rabbinic Judaism (various contestants before the Enlightened were branded as schismatics and cast out), they very much emulated the manner in which secular intellectuals dethroned and replaced the Church from the same status among Christians. Thus the maskilim generated an upheaval which – though by no means alone – broke the sway held by the rabbis and the traditional values over Jewish society. Combined with many other factors, they laid the path to all modern Jewish movements and philosophies, either those critical, hostile or supportive to themselves.

The maskilim sought to replace the framework of values held by the Ashkenazim of Central and Eastern Europe with their own philosophy, which embraced the liberal, rationalistic notions of the 18th and 19th centuries and cast them in their own particular mold. This intellectual upheaval was accompanied by the desire to practically change Jewish society. Even the moderate maskilim viewed the contemporary state of Jews as deplorable and in dire need of rejuvenation, whether in matters of morals, cultural creativity or economic productivity. They argued that such conditions were rightfully scorned by others and untenable from both practical and idealistic perspectives. It was to be remedied by the shedding of the base and corrupt elements of Jewish existence and retention of only the true, positive ones; indeed, the question what those were, exactly, loomed as the greatest challenge of Jewish modernity.

The more extreme and ideologically bent came close to the universalist aspirations of the radical Enlightenment, of a world freed of superstition and backwardness in which all humans will come together under the liberating influence of reason and progress. The reconstituted Jews, these radical maskilim believed, would be able to take their place as equals in an enlightened world. But all, including the moderate and disillusioned, stated that adjustment to the changing world was both unavoidable and positive in itself.

Haskalah ideals were converted into practical steps via numerous reform programs initiated locally and independently by its activists, acting in small groups or even alone at every time and area. Members of the movement sought to acquaint their people with European culture, have them adopt the vernacular language of their lands, and integrate them into larger society. They opposed Jewish reclusiveness and self-segregation, called upon Jews to discard traditional dress in favour of the prevalent one, and preached patriotism and loyalty to the new centralized governments. They acted to weaken and limit the jurisdiction of traditional community institutions – the rabbinic courts, empowered to rule on numerous civic matters, and the board of elders, which served as lay leadership. The maskilim perceived those as remnants of medieval discrimination. They criticized various traits of Jewish society, such as child marriage – traumatized memories from unions entered at the age of thirteen or fourteen are a common theme in Haskalah literature – the use of anathema to enforce community will and the concentration on virtually only religious studies.

Maskilic reforms included educational efforts. In 1778, partisans of the movement were among the founders of the Berlin Jewish Free School, or Hevrat Hinuch Ne'arim (Society for the Education of Boys), the first institution in Ashkenazi Jewry that taught general studies in addition to the reformulated and reduced traditional curriculum. This model, with different stresses, was applied elsewhere. Joseph Perl opened the first modern Jewish school in Galicia at Tarnopol in 1813, and Eastern European maskilim opened similar institutes in the Pale of Settlement and Congress Poland. They all abandoned the received methods of Ashkenazi education: study of the Pentateuch with the archaic I'vri-Taitsch (medieval Yiddish) translation and an exclusive focus on the Talmud as a subject of higher learning, all presided over by old-school tutors, melamdim, who were particularly reviled in maskilic circles. Those were replaced by teachers trained in modern methods, among others in the spirit of German philanthropinism, who sought to acquaint their pupils with refined Hebrew so they may understand the Pentateuch and prayers and thus better identify with their heritage; ignorance of Hebrew was often lamented by maskilim as breeding apathy towards Judaism. Far less Talmud, considered cumbersome and ill-suited for children, was taught; elements considered superstitious, like midrashim, were also removed. Matters of faith were taught in rationalistic spirit, and in radical circles also in a sanitized manner. On the other hand, the curriculum was augmented by general studies like math, vernacular language, and so forth.

In the linguistic field, the maskilim wished to replace the dualism which characterized the traditional Ashkenazi community, which spoke Judaeo-German and its formal literary language was Hebrew, with another: a refined Hebrew for internal usage and the local vernacular for external ones. They almost universally abhorred Judaeo-German, regarding it as a corrupt dialect and another symptom of Jewish destitution – the movement pioneered the negative attitude to Yiddish which persisted many years later among the educated – though often its activists had to resort to it for lack of better medium to address the masses. Aaron Halle-Wolfssohn, for example, authored the first modern Judaeo-German play, Leichtsinn und Frömmelei (Rashness and Sanctimony) in 1796. On the economic front, the maskilim preached productivization and abandonment of traditional Jewish occupations in favour of agriculture, trades and liberal professions.

In matters of faith (which were being cordoned off into a distinct sphere of "religion" by modernization pressures) the movement's partisans, from moderates to radicals, lacked any uniform coherent agenda. The main standard through which they judged Judaism was that of rationalism. Their most important contribution was the revival of Jewish philosophy, rather dormant since the Italian Renaissance, as an alternative to mysticist Kabbalah which served as almost the sole system of thought among Ashkenazim and an explanatory system for observance. Rather than complex allegorical exegesis, the Haskalah sought a literal understanding of scripture and sacred literature. The rejection of Kabbalah, often accompanied with attempts to refute the ancientness of the Zohar, were extremely controversial in traditional society; apart from that, the maskilim had little in common. On the right-wing were conservative members of the rabbinic elite who merely wanted a rationalist approach, and on the extreme left some ventured far beyond the pale of orthodoxy towards Deism.

Another aspect was the movement's attitude to gender relations. Many of the maskilim were raised in the rabbinic elite, in which (unlike among the poor Jewish masses or the rich communal wardens) the males were immersed in traditional studies and their wives supported them financially, mostly by running business. Many of the Jewish enlightened were traumatized by their own experiences, either of assertive mothers or early marriage, often conducted at the age of thirteen. Bitter memories from those are a common theme in maskilic autobiographies. Having imbibed the image of European bourgeoisie family values, many of them sought to challenge the semi-matriarchal order of rabbinic families – which combined a lack of Jewish education for women with granting them the status of providers – early marriage, and rigid modesty. Instead, they insisted that men become economically productive while confining their wives to the home environment but also granting them proper religious education, reversing Jewish custom and copying contemporary Christian attitudes.

=== Transitory phenomena ===
The Haskalah was also mainly a movement of transformation, straddling both the declining traditional Jewish society of autonomous community and cultural seclusion and the beginnings of a modern Jewish public. As noted by Feiner, everything connected with the Haskalah was dualistic in nature. The Jewish Enlighteners pursued two parallel agendas: they exhorted the Jews to acculturate and harmonize with the modern state, and demanded that the Jews remain a distinct group with its own culture and identity. Theirs was a middle position between Jewish community and surrounding society, received mores and modernity. Sliding away from this precarious equilibrium, in any direction, signified also one's break with the Jewish Enlightenment.

Virtually all maskilim received old-style, secluded education, and were young Torah scholars before they were first exposed to outside knowledge (from a gender perspective, the movement was almost totally male-dominated; women did not receive sufficient tutoring to master Hebrew). For generations, Mendelssohn's Bible translation to German was employed by such young initiates to bridge the linguistic gap and learn a foreign language, having been raised on Hebrew and Yiddish only. The experience of abandoning one's sheltered community and struggle with tradition was a ubiquitous trait of maskilic biographies. The children of these activists almost never followed their parents; they rather went forward in the path of acculturation and assimilation. While their fathers learned the vernaculars late and still consumed much Hebrew literature, the little available material in the language did not attract their offspring, who often lacked a grasp of Hebrew due to not sharing their parents' traditional education. Haskalah was, by and large, a unigenerational experience.

In the linguistic field, this transitory nature was well attested. The traditional Jewish community in Europe inhabited two separate spheres of communication: one internal, where Hebrew served as written high language and Yiddish as vernacular for the masses, and one external, where Latin and the like were used for apologetic and intercessory purposes toward the Christian world. A tiny minority of writers was concerned with the latter. The Haskalah sought to introduce a different bilingualism: renovated, refined Hebrew for internal matters, while Yiddish was to be eliminated; and national vernaculars, to be taught to all Jews, for external ones. However, they insisted on the maintenance of both spheres. When acculturation far exceeded the movement's plans, Central European Jews turned almost solely to the vernacular. David Sorkin demonstrated this with the two great journals of German Jewry: the maskilic Ha-Me'assef was written in Hebrew and supported the study of German; the post-maskilic Sulamith (published since 1806) was written almost entirely in German, befitting its editors' agenda of linguistic assimilation. Likewise, upon the demise of Jewish Enlightenment in Eastern Europe, authors abandoned the maskilic paradigm not toward assimilation but in favour of exclusive use of Hebrew and Yiddish.

The political vision of the Haskalah was predicated on a similar approach. It opposed the reclusive community of the past but sought a maintenance of a strong Jewish framework (with themselves as leaders and intercessors with the state authorities); the Enlightened were not even fully agreeable to civic emancipation, and many of them viewed it with reserve, sometimes anxiety. In their writings, they drew a sharp line between themselves and whom they termed "pseudo-maskilim" – those who embraced the Enlightenment values and secular knowledge but did not seek to balance these with their Jewishness, but rather strove for full assimilation. Such elements, whether the radical universalists who broke off the late Berlin Haskalah or the Russified intelligentsia in Eastern Europe a century later, were castigated and derided no less than the old rabbinic authorities which the movement confronted. It was not uncommon for its partisans to become a conservative element, combating against further dilution of tradition: in Vilnius, Samuel Joseph Fuenn turned from a progressive into an adversary of more radical elements within a generation. In the Maghreb, the few local maskilim were more concerned with the rapid assimilation of local Jews into the colonial French culture than with the ills of traditional society.

Likewise, those who abandoned the optimistic, liberal vision of the Jews (albeit as a cohesive community) integrating into wider society in favour of full-blown Jewish nationalism or radical, revolutionary ideologies which strove to uproot the established order like Socialism, also broke with the Haskalah. The Jewish national movements of Eastern Europe, founded by disillusioned maskilim, derisively regarded it – in a manner similar to other romantic-nationalist movements' understanding of the general Enlightenment – as a naive, liberal and assimilationist ideology which induced foreign cultural influences, gnawed at the Jewish national consciousness and promised false hopes of equality in exchange for spiritual enslavement. This hostile view was promulgated by nationalist thinkers and historians, from Peretz Smolenskin, Ahad Ha'am, Simon Dubnow and onwards. It was once common in Israeli historiography.

A major factor which always characterized the movement was its weakness and its dependence of much more powerful elements. Its partisans were mostly impoverished intellectuals, who eked out a living as private tutors and the like; few had a stable financial base, and they required patrons, whether affluent Jews or the state's institutions. This triplice – the authorities, the Jewish communal elite, and the maskilim – was united only in the ambition of thoroughly reforming Jewish society. The government had no interest in the visions of renaissance which the Enlightened so fervently cherished. It demanded the Jews to turn into productive, loyal subjects with rudimentary secular education, and no more. The rich Jews were sometimes open to the movement's agenda, but mostly practical, hoping for a betterment of their people that would result in emancipation and equal rights. Indeed, the great cultural transformation which occurred among the Parnassim (affluent communal wardens) class – they were always more open to outside society, and had to tutor their children in secular subjects, thus inviting general Enlightenment influences – was a precondition of Haskalah. The state and the elite required the maskilim as interlocutors and specialists in their efforts for reform, especially as educators, and the latter used this as leverage to benefit their ideology. However, the activists were much more dependent on the former than vice versa; frustration from one's inability to further the maskilic agenda and being surrounded by apathetic Jews, either conservative "fanatics" or parvenu "assimilationists", is a common theme in the movement's literature.

The term Haskalah became synonymous, among friends and foes alike and in much of early Jewish historiography, with the sweeping changes that engulfed Jewish society (mostly in Europe) from the late 18th century to the late 19th century. It was depicted by its partisans, adversaries and historians like Heinrich Graetz as a major factor in those; Feiner noted that "every modern Jew was identified as a maskil and every change in traditional religious patterns was dubbed Haskalah". Later research greatly narrowed the scope of the phenomenon and limited its importance: while Haskalah undoubtedly played a part, the contemporary historical consensus portrays it as much humbler. Other transformation agents, from state-imposed schools to new economic opportunities, were demonstrated to have rivaled or overshadowed the movement completely in propelling such processes as acculturation, secularization, religious reform from moderate to extreme, adoption of native patriotism and so forth. In many regions the Haskalah had no effect at all.

== Origins ==
As long as the Jews lived in segregated communities, and as long as all social interaction with their gentile neighbors was limited, the rabbi was the most influential member of the Jewish community. In addition to being a religious scholar and "clergy", a rabbi also acted as a civil judge in all cases in which both parties were Jews. Rabbis sometimes had other important administrative powers, together with the community elders. The rabbinate was the highest aim of many Jewish boys, and the study of the Talmud was the means of obtaining that coveted position, or one of many other important communal distinctions. Haskalah followers advocated "coming out of the ghetto", not just physically but also mentally and spiritually, in order to assimilate among gentile nations.

The example of Moses Mendelssohn (1729–86), a Prussian Jew, served to lead this movement, which was also shaped by Aaron Halle-Wolfssohn (1754–1835) and Joseph Perl (1773–1839). Mendelssohn's success as a philosopher and man of letters revealed hitherto unsuspected possibilities of integration and acceptance of Jews among non-Jews. Mendelssohn also provided methods for Jews to enter the general society of Germany. A good knowledge of the German language was necessary to secure entrance into cultured German circles, and a means of acquiring it was provided by Mendelssohn in his German translation of the Torah. This work became a bridge over which ambitious young Jews could pass to enter the world of secular knowledge. The Biur, or grammatical commentary, prepared under Mendelssohn's supervision, was designed to counteract the influence of traditional rabbinical methods of exegesis. Together with the translation, it became, as it were, the primer of Haskalah.

Language played a key role in the haskalah movement, as Mendelssohn and others called for a revival of Hebrew and a reduction in the use of Yiddish. The result was an outpouring of new, secular literature, as well as critical studies of religious texts. Julius Fürst along with other German-Jewish scholars compiled Hebrew and Aramaic dictionaries and grammars. Jews also began to study and communicate in the languages of the countries in which they settled, providing another gateway for integration.

Berlin was the city of origin for the movement. The capital city of Prussia and, later, the German Empire, Berlin became known as a secular, multi-cultural and multi-ethnic center, a fertile environment for conversations and radical movements. This move by the Maskilim away from religious study, into much more critical and worldly studies was made possible by this German city of modern and progressive thought. It was a city in which the rising middle class Jews and intellectual elites not only lived among, but were exposed to previous Age of Enlightenment thinkers such as Voltaire, Diderot, and Rousseau. The movement is often referred to as the Berlin Haskalah. Reference to Berlin in relation to the Haskalah movement is necessary because it provides context for this episode of Jewish history. Subsequently, having left Germany and spreading across Eastern Europe, the Berlin Haskalah influenced multiple Jewish communities who were interested in non-religious scholarly texts and insight to worlds beyond their Jewish enclaves.

== Spread ==
Haskalah did not stay restricted to Germany, however, and the movement quickly spread throughout Europe. Poland–Lithuania was the heartland of Rabbinic Judaism, with its two streams of Misnagdic Talmudism centred primarily in Lithuania and Belarus, and Hasidic mysticism popular in Ukraine, Poland, Hungary and Russia. In the 19th century, Haskalah sought dissemination and transformation of traditional education and inward pious life in Eastern Europe. It adapted its message to these different environments, working with the Russian government of the Pale of Settlement to influence secular educational methods, while its writers satirised Hasidic mysticism, in favour of solely Rationalist interpretation of Judaism. Isaac Baer Levinsohn (1788–1860) became known as the "Russian Mendelssohn". Joseph Perl's (1773–1839) satire of the Hasidic movement, "Revealer of Secrets" (Megalleh Temirim), is said to be the first modern novel in Hebrew. It was published in Vienna in 1819 under the pseudonym "Obadiah ben Pethahiah". The Haskalah's message of integration into non-Jewish society was subsequently counteracted by alternative secular Jewish political movements advocating Folkish, Socialist or Nationalist secular Jewish identities in Eastern Europe. While Haskalah advocated Hebrew and sought to remove Yiddish, these subsequent developments advocated Yiddish Renaissance among Maskilim. Writers of Yiddish literature variously satirised or sentimentalised Hasidic mysticism.

== Effects ==
The Haskalah also resulted in the creation of a secular Jewish culture, with an emphasis on Jewish history and Jewish identity, rather than on religion. This, in turn, resulted in the political engagement of Jews in a variety of competing ways within the countries where they lived on issues that included

- the struggle for Jewish emancipation
- involvement in new Jewish political movements, and
- later (in the face of continued persecutions in late nineteenth-century Europe), the development of Zionism.

One commentator describes these effects as "The emancipation of the Jews brought forth two opposed movements: the cultural assimilation, begun by Moses Mendelssohn, and Zionism, founded by Theodor Herzl in 1896."

One facet of the Haskalah was a widespread cultural adaptation, as those Jews who participated in the enlightenment began, in varying degrees, to participate in the cultural practices of the surrounding gentile population. Connected with this was the birth of the Reform movement, whose founders (such as Israel Jacobson and Leopold Zunz) rejected the continuing observance of those aspects of Jewish law which they classified as ritual—as opposed to moral or ethical. Even within orthodoxy, the Haskalah was felt through the appearance, in response, of the Mussar Movement in Lithuania, and Torah im Derech Eretz in Germany. "Enlightened" Jews sided with gentile governments, in plans to increase secular education and assimilation among the Jewish masses, which brought them into acute conflict with the orthodox, who believed this threatened the traditional Jewish lifestyle – which had up until that point been maintained through segregation from their gentile neighbors – and Jewish identity itself.

The spread of Haskalah affected Judaism, as a religion, because of the degree to which different sects desired to be integrated, and in turn, integrate their religious traditions. The effects of the Enlightenment were already present in Jewish religious music, and in opinion on the tension between traditionalist and modernist tendencies. Groups of Reform Jews, including the Society of the Friends of Reform and the Association for the Reform of Judaism were formed, because such groups wanted, and actively advocated for, a change in Jewish tradition, in particular, regarding rituals like circumcision. Another non-Orthodox group was the Conservative Jews, who emphasized the importance of traditions but viewed with a historical perspective. The Orthodox Jews were actively against these reformers because they viewed changing Jewish tradition as an insult to God and believed that fulfillment in life could be found in serving God and keeping his commandments. The effect of Haskalah was that it gave a voice to plurality of views, while the orthodoxy preserved the tradition, even to the point of insisting on dividing between sects.

Another important facet of the Haskalah was its interest in non-Jewish religions, and for some the desire to synchronize or appreciate Christian and Muslim traditions and history. Moses Mendelssohn criticized some aspects of Christianity, but depicted Jesus as a Torah-observant rabbi, who was loyal to traditional Judaism. Mendelssohn explicitly linked positive Jewish views of Jesus with the issues of Emancipation and Jewish-Christian reconciliation. Similar revisionist views were expressed by Rabbi Isaac Ber Levinsohn and other traditional representatives of the Haskalah movement.

== List of Maskilim ==
- Abraham Dob Bär Lebensohn (~1790–1878) was a Lithuanian Jewish Hebraist, poet, and grammarian.
- Abraham Jacob Paperna (1840–1919) was a Russian Jewish educator and author.
- Aleksander Zederbaum (1816–1893) was a Polish-Russian Jewish journalist. He was founder and editor of Ha-Meliẓ, and other periodicals published in Russian and Yiddish; he wrote in Hebrew.
- Avrom Ber Gotlober (1811–1899) was a Jewish writer, poet, playwright, historian, journalist and educator. He mostly wrote in Hebrew, but also wrote poetry and dramas in Yiddish. His first collection was published in 1835.
- David Friesenhausen (1756–1828), was a Hungarian maskil, mathematician, and Rabbi.
- Aaron Halle-Wolfssohn (1754/6 - 1835), German-Jewish writer, translator, Biblical commentator.
- Eliezer Dob Liebermann (1820–1895) was a Russian Hebrew-language writer.
- Ephraim Deinard (1846–1930) was one of the greatest Hebrew 'bookmen' of all time. He was a bookseller, bibliographer, publicist, polemicist, historian, memoirist, author, editor and publisher.
- Isaac Bär Levinsohn (1788-1860), also known as the Ribal; Jewish scholar of Hebrew, a satirist, a writer and Haskalah leader. He has been called "the Mendelssohn of Russia."
- Moses Mendelssohn (1729-1786) philosopher and theologian, one of the central founders of Haskalah (noted in Haskalah article)
- Joseph Perl (1773-1839) (noted in Haskalah article)
- Isaac Benjacob (1801–1863) was a Russian bibliographer, author, and publisher. His parents moved to Vilnius when he was still a child, and there he received instruction in Hebrew grammar and rabbinical lore.
- Kalman Schulman (1819–1899) was a Jewish writer who translated various volumes and novels into Hebrew.

== See also ==
- Immanuel Kant
- Saul Ascher

== Literature ==
- Resources > Modern Period > Central and Western Europe (17th\18th Cent.) > Enlightenment (Haskala) The Jewish History Resource Center – Project of the Dinur Center for Research in Jewish History, The Hebrew University of Jerusalem
- Rashi by Maurice Liber Discusses Rashi's influence on Moses Mendelssohn and the Haskalah.
- Jewish Virtual Library on Haskalah
- Dauber, Jeremy (2004). Antonio's Devils: Writers of the Jewish Enlightenment and the Birth of Modern Hebrew and Yiddish Literature. Stanford: Stanford University Press.
- Litvak, Olga (2012). Haskalah. The Romantic Movement in Judaism. New Brunswick, New Jersey, London: Rutgers University Press.
- Rasplus, Valéry "Les judaïsmes à l'épreuve des Lumières. Les stratégies critiques de la Haskalah", in: ContreTemps, n° 17, septembre 2006 (in French)
- Ruderman, David B. (2000). Jewish Enlightenment in an English Key: Anglo-Jewry's Construction of Modern Jewish Thought. Princeton, NJ: Princeton University Press.
- Schumacher-Brunhes, Marie (2012). Enlightenment Jewish Style: The Haskalah Movement in Europe. Mainz: Leibniz Institute of European History (IEG). Digital version available at European History Online:
- Wodzinski, Marcin (2009). Haskalah and Hasidism in the Kingdom of Poland: a History of Conflict. Oxford: Littman Library of Jewish Civilization. ISBN 978-1-904113-08-9. (translated from Oświecenie żydowskie w Królestwie Polskim wobec chasydyzmu)
- Brinker, Menahem (2008), The Unique Case of Jewish Secularism (audio archive giving history of ideas of the Haskalah movement and its later secular offshoot movements), London Jewish Book Week.
