= Estella Hijmans-Hertzveld =

Dutch writer (1837–1881)

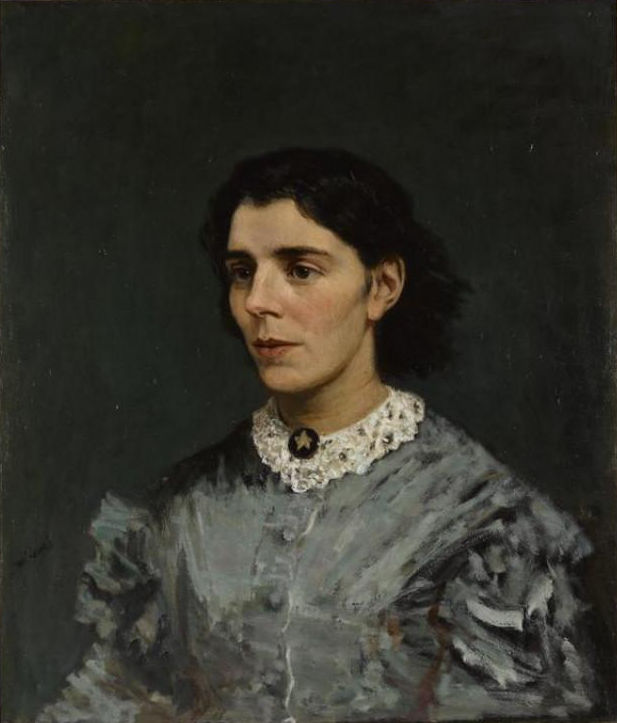
- Portrait by Jozef Israëls, c. 1870–1872
- Born: Estella Dorothea Salomea Hertzveld; 14 July 1837; The Hague, Netherlands
- Died: 4 November 1881 (aged 44); Arnhem, Netherlands
- Resting place: Joodse begraafplaatsen, Wageningen, Netherlands
- Spouse: Jacobus Hijmans (m. 1863)

Signature
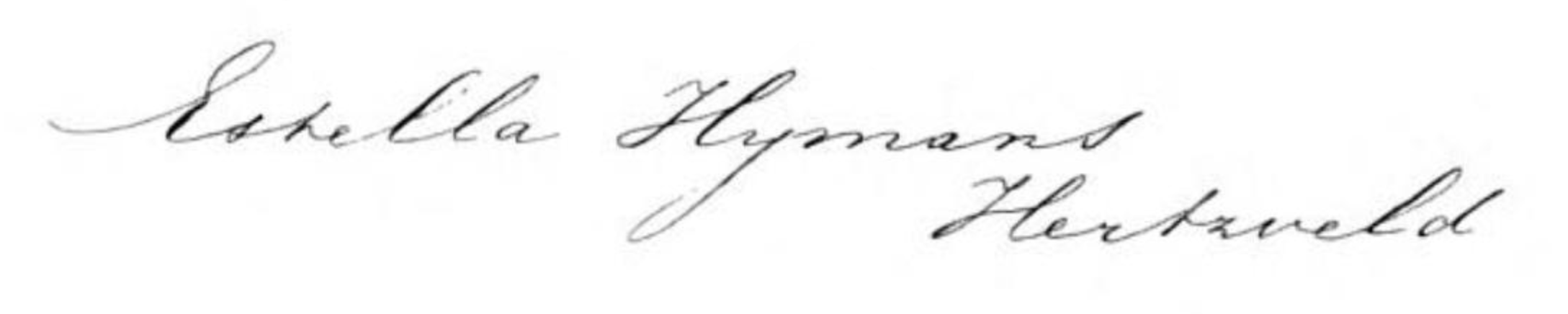

Estella Dorothea Salomea Hijmans-Hertzveld (14 July 1837 – 4 November 1881) was a Dutch poet, translator, and activist. From a young age, her poems, mainly on Biblical and historical themes, appeared regularly in respectable literary journals. Frequently, her work also addressed contemporary social issues, including the abolition of slavery, Jewish emancipation, and opposition to war. A collection of her best-known poems, entitled Gedichten ('Poems'), was published several weeks before her death in 1881.

== Biography ==
=== Early life ===
Estella Hertzveld was born at The Hague in 1837 to Devora Elka (née Halberstamm) and Salomon Hartog Hertzveld, the eldest of six children. Her father was a senior civil servant and taxation expert in the Ministry of Finance from a family of renowned rabbis; her grandfather, Hartog Joshua Hertzveld, served as Chief Rabbi of Overijssel and Drenthe from 1808 to 1864.

Hertzveld distinguished herself at a young age as a gifted writer and poet and was mentored by Dutch poet Carel Godfried Withuys. At the age of 14, she composed "Sauls Dood" ('Saul's Death'), which appeared in the Vaderlandsche Letteroefeningen, then edited by Withuys, in 1852. The composition was recited to great approbation by poet Jacob van Gigh at a meeting of the Maatschappij tot Nut der Israëlieten ('Society for the Benefit of Israelites'). The Jewish convert to Christianity Abraham Capadose dedicated to Hertzveld his 1853 translation of Leila Ada, the Jewish Convert; in public letters she distanced herself from Capadose's beliefs.

=== Career ===
Her poems soon appeared regularly in the Israëlietische Jaarboekje ('Israelite Yearbook') and the Almanak voor het schoone en goede ('Almanac for the Beautiful and Good'), most notably "Elias in de Woestijn" ('Elias in the Desert', 1853) and "Tocht der Israëlieten door de Roode zee" ('Journey of the Jewish People Through the Red Sea', 1854). She would later publish poetry in the periodicals Amora, Castalia, Vaderlandsche Letteroefeningen, Jaarboekje voor Tesselschade, and Jaarboekje voor Rederijkers.

At the same time, Hertzveld mastered German, English, French, Danish, Norwegian, Italian, and Hebrew, and began penning translations of novels in these languages.

Prominent among Dutch literary circles, Hertzveld maintained close ties with other Dutch writers, including Geertruida Bosboom-Toussaint and Johannes Jan Cremer. She was often asked to give presentations at festive occasions and wrote hymns for the consecration of a new schoolhouse and new synagogues in Hardenberg (1855) and Delft (1862).

=== Later life ===
Hertzveld married Jacobus Hijmans, a successful businessman from Veenendaal twenty-one years her senior, in Delft on 16 December 1863. After the wedding, officiated by Chief Rabbi Issachar Baer Berenstein, the two settled in Arnhem. They together had six children: Hannah (1864–1937), Dorothea Dina Estella (1865–1899), Hugo Siegfried Johan (1867–1944), Willem Dagobert George Marie (1868–1872), Leopold Maurits Bernard (1870–1904), and Maria Sophia Elisabeth (1871–1961).

She co-founded and chaired the Arnhem division of the Arbeid Adelt women's rights organisation in 1872, but stepped down after the death of her son Willem that year.

A few years later she was diagnosed with pulmonary tuberculosis. Still, she wrote a poem for an album presented to Prince Hendrik on the occasion of his marriage in the summer of 1878, and a verse in an album for Queen Emma in the fall of the same year. From 1880 she inhabitted a sanatorium in Reichenthal, Upper Austria. In anticipation of approaching death, she arranged a collection of her poems dedicated to her children. It was published under the title Gedichten van Estella Hijmans-Hertzveld ('Poems by Estella Hijmans-Hertzveld') by her brother-in-law George Belinfante in October 1881. She died a few weeks later at the age of 44, and was interred at the Joodse begraafplaatsen in Wageningen.

== Work ==
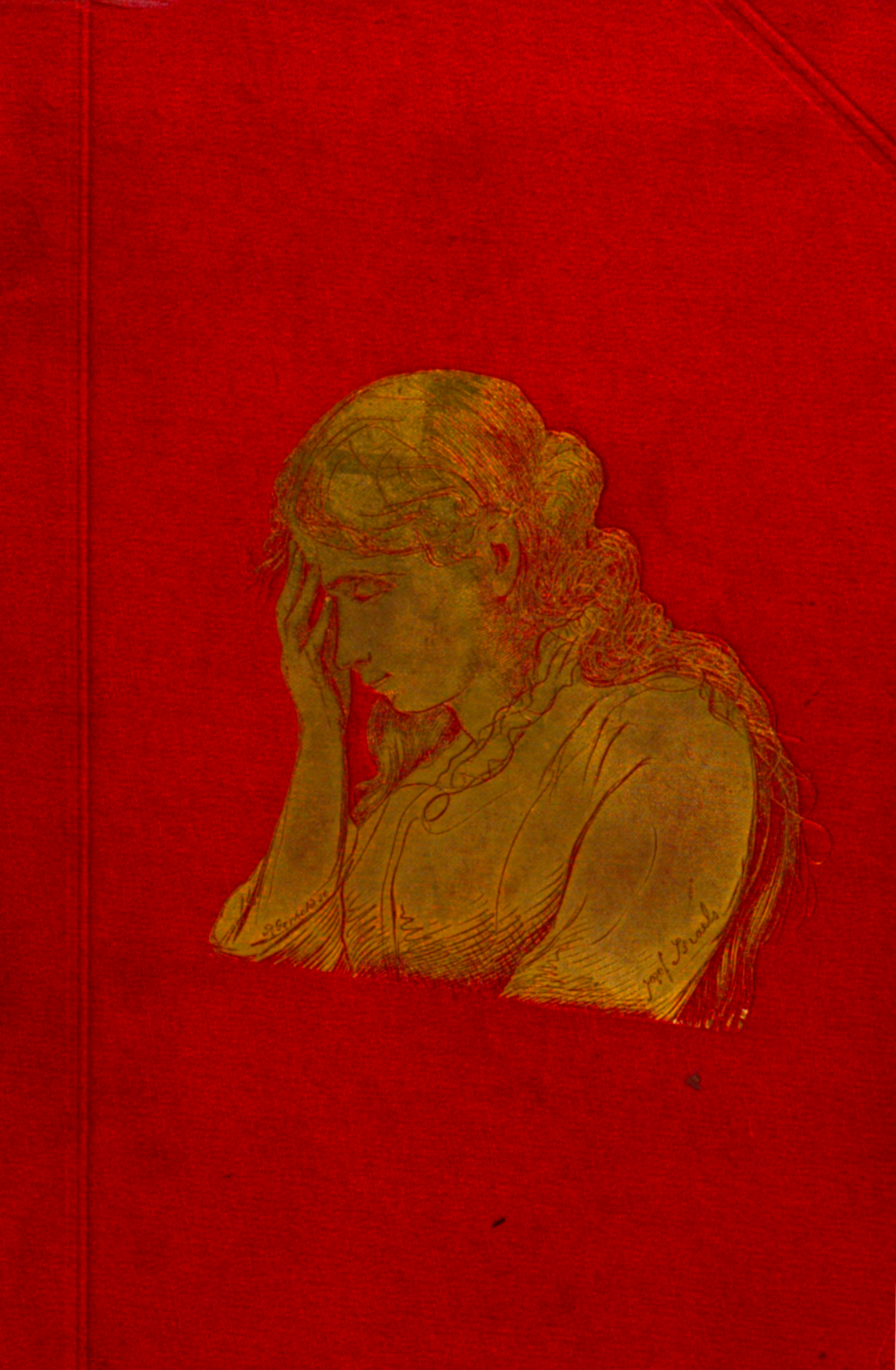
Cover of Gedichten (1881)

Hertzveld composed "Esther" for Samuel Israel Mulder's 1854 collection of Biblical poetry, and her 1856 work "Het Gebed" ('The Prayer') was translated into Hebrew by Abraham D. Delaville. In support of the devastating floods in 1855 and 1861 across the Netherlands, she published "God redt" ('God Saves') and "Januari 1861" (January 1861), respectively. In 1863 Hertzveld wrote an epic poem to Empress Maria Theresa of Austria for the collection Historische vrouwen ('Historical Women'). Her poem "De Priesterzegen" ('The Priestly Blessing', 1853), which draws a link between the priests of the Temple service and the service in a ghetto synagogue, inspired paintings by Dutch Jewish painters Maurits Léon and Eduard Frankfort.

Among other writings, she translated from German Ludwig Philippson's oratio Mose auf Nebo (1858), from English Grace Aguilar's Sabbath Thoughts and Sacred Communings (1859), and a series of Norwegian articles by Henrik Wergeland, who advocated for the opening of Norway's borders to Jewish immigration.

The poetry of her later career was characterized by its emphasis on social activism. Hertzveld composed "Lied der negerin, een dag vóór de vrijheid" ('Song of the Negro, a Day Before Freedom') in celebration of the abolition of slavery in the Dutch colonies in 1863; "Stemmen en zangen" ('Voices and Chants'), decrying the Prussian invasion of Schleswig-Holstein in 1864, a copy of which her father gifted to Hans Christian Andersen during his second visit to the Netherlands in 1866; and "Het triomflied der beschaving" ('The Triumphant Song of Civilisation'), denouncing the horrors of war, in 1866.

Hertzveld's poems "Poezie" ('Poetry'), "De laatste der Barden" ('The Last of the Bards'), "Abd-el-Kader" ('Abdelkader'), and "Het triomflied der beschaving" were featured in Jan Pieter de Keyser's Dutch Literature in the Nineteenth Century (1881), and the poem "Abram" in Samuel Johannes van den Bergh's Bloemlezing der poëzie van Nederlandse dichteressen.

=== Publications ===
- God redt. Een voorval uit den jongsten watersnood [God Saves: An Incident from the Last Flood]. The Hague: Gebroeders Belinfante. 1855.
- Het gebed. Dichtstuk met eene Hebreeuwsche vertal. van A. D. Delaville [The Prayer: Poem with a Hebrew translation by A. D. Delaville]. The Hague: Gebroeders Belinfante. 1857.
- Januari 1861. Dichtregelen ten behoeve der noodlijdenden door de overstroomingen [January 1861: Poem for the Benefit of Those Distressed by the Floods]. The Hague: Gebroeders Belinfante. 1861.
- Maria Theresia. Historische vrouwen. Dichterlijk album. Vol. 12. Haarlem: A. C. Kruseman. 1861.
- Gedichten [Poems]. The Hague: Gebroeders Belinfante. 1881. hdl:2027/hvd.hn2wlg.
