= Samuel Holdheim =

German rabbi and author (1806-1860)

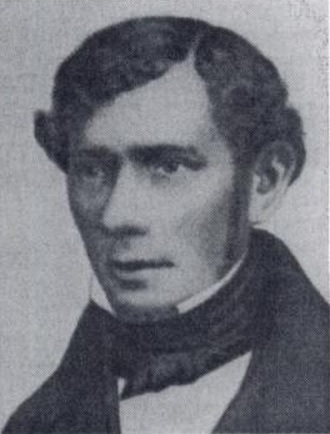
- Holdheim in his later years

Personal life
- Born: 1806 Kępno, South Prussia
- Died: 22 August 1860 (aged 53–54) Berlin, Prussia

Religious life
- Religion: Judaism

Samuel Holdheim (1806 – 22 August 1860) was a German rabbi and author, and one of the more radical leaders of the early Reform Movement in Judaism. A pioneer in modern Jewish homiletics, he was often at odds with the Orthodox community.

== Early life ==
Holdheim was born at Kempen in South Prussia in 1806. The son of rigidly traditional parents, Holdheim was early inducted into rabbinical literature according to the methods in vogue at the Talmudical yeshivas. Before he was able to speak German with even moderate correctness, he had become a master of Talmudic argumentation, and his fame had traveled far beyond the limits of his native place. This reputation secured for him employment as teacher of young boys in private families both in Kempen and in larger cities of his native province. It was while thus engaged that he began to supplement his store of rabbinical knowledge by private studies in the secular and classical branches.

Holdheim went to Prague and subsequently to Berlin to study philosophy and humanities; and his keen intellect, combined with his eagerness to learn, made it possible for him to reach his goal in an incredibly short time, though the lack of preliminary systematic preparation left its imprint upon his mind, to a certain degree, to the last. Under Samuel Landau of Prague he continued also his Talmudical studies. While still a young man it became his ambition to occupy a rabbinical position in a larger German town; for he desired to show the older rabbis that secular and philosophical scholarship could well be harmonized with rabbinical erudition. But he had to wait until 1836, when, after several disappointments elsewhere, he was called as rabbi to Frankfurt an der Oder. Here he remained until 1840, encountering many difficulties, due both to the distrust of those within the congregation who suspected the piety of a rabbi able to speak grammatical German, and who was a graduate of a German university, and to the peculiar legislation which in Prussia under Frederick William III regulated the status of the Jewish congregations.

== Attitude toward government ==
Holdheim's purpose was to bring about a change in this state of affairs. In the preface to his Gottesdienstliche Vorträge (Frankfurt (Oder), 1839) he appealed both to the government to accord the modern rabbinate the dignity due to it, and to the congregations to cease regarding the rabbi as an expert in Jewish casuistry mainly charged with the duty of answering she'elot (ritual questions) and inquiries concerning dietary laws. He insisted upon the recognition of the rabbi as preacher and teacher, who at the same time gives attention to the practical requirements of his office as the expert in Talmudical law.

While in Frankfurt, Holdheim scrupulously decided every question according to the halakha. In his pulpit discourses belonging to this period the intention is plain to steer clear of mere rationalistic moralizing, on the one hand, and dry legalizing and unscientific speculation (in the style of the old derashah), on the other. Holdheim thus deserves to be remembered as one of the pioneers in the field of modern Jewish homiletics, who showed what use should be made of the Midrashim and other Jewish writings. He also repeatedly took pains to arouse his congregation to help carry out Abraham Geiger's and Ludwig Philippson's project of founding a Jewish theological faculty. Judaism even then had ceased for Holdheim to be an end unto itself. He had begun to view it as a force in the larger life of humanity.

== Progressive views ==
Holdheim now became a contributor to the Jewish periodicals (e.g., Philippson's Allgemeine Zeitung des Judenthums and Jost's Israelitische Annalen). Two of his articles are especially noteworthy. One (in Allg. Zeit. des Jud. ii, Nos. 4-9) discusses the essential principles of Judaism, arriving at the conclusion that Judaism has no binding dogmas; the other (Jost's Annalen, 1839, Nos. 30-32) treats of the oath demanded of Jewish witnesses in criminal procedures. In the former of these papers Holdheim formulates the principle which is basic to his position and that of other Reformers: Judaism is not a religion of dead creed, but of living deeds. In the latter essay he utilizes his Talmudic juridical erudition to demonstrate the injustice done to the Jews by the Prussian courts. Another of his Frankfurt publications bears the title Der Religiöse Fortschritt im deutschen Judenthume (Leipzig, 1840). The occasion which called forth this booklet was the controversy raging around Geiger's election as rabbi in Breslau. Holdheim pleads for progress, on the ground that at all times the Torah has been taught, in accordance with the changing conditions of succeeding ages; but this progress he holds to be a gradual development, never a noisy opposition to recognized existing standards.

In the meantime Holdheim had received the degree of PhD from the University of Leipzig, and had come to be looked up to by congregations as well as by Jewish scholars as a leader (see Orient. Lit. 1840, No. 35 et passim; Jost's Annalen, 1840, No. 39). Frankfurt having become too restricted a sphere for him, he accepted a call to Schwerin as Landesrabbiner of Mecklenburg-Schwerin, leaving Frankfurt on August 15, 1840.

== Hamburg Temple controversy ==
In his new field Holdheim gave his first attention to the founding of schools for Jewish children. The Hamburg Temple controversy led him to take part in the discussion (see Annalen, 1841, Nos. 45, 46). He hailed the new movement as an important augury of the quickening influences of modern views. He defended the Hamburg program as thoroughly founded in Judaism and in the very line of the synagogue's own history, though he was not blind to its inconsistencies. Yet, even though authority of tradition was denied and recognized at one and the same time, the movement stood for the differentiation of the Jewish national from the Jewish religious elements. He also wrote an opinion (Gutachten) on the prayer-book of the Hamburg Temple (Hamburg, 1841), justifying its departures from the old forms by appealing to Talmudical precedents (Soṭah vii.1; Ber. 10a, 27b, 33a; Maimonides, "Yad", Tefillah, xi.9). Among the many rejoinders which Ḥakam Bernays' excommunication of this prayer-book evoked, Holdheim's deserves to be ranked as the most thorough and incisive.

== More controversies ==
Soon after, the most important work by Holdheim appeared under the title Die Autonomie der Rabbinen (Schwerin and Berlin, 1843). In this, he pleads for the abolition of the antiquated Jewish marriage and divorce regulations mainly on the ground that the Jews do not constitute a political nation. The Jewish religious institutions must be rigidly kept distinct from the Jewish national ones, to which the latter belong the laws of marriage and divorce. The laws of the modern states are not in conflict with the principles of the Jewish religion; therefore these modern laws, and not the Jewish national laws of other days, should regulate Jewish marriages and divorces (see Samuel Hirsch in Orient. Lit., 1843, No. 44). The importance of this book is attested by the stir it created among German Jewish communities, many members of which found in its attitude the solution of the problem of how loyalty to Judaism could be combined with unqualified allegiance to their German nationality. Evidence of its incisive character is furnished also by the polemical literature that grew out of it. In these discussions such men as A. Bernstein, Mendel Hess, Samson Raphael Hirsch, Zecharias Frankel, Raphael Kirchheim, Leopold Zunz, Leopold Löw, and Adolf Jellinek took part.

The foundation of the Reform Verein in Frankfurt am Main led to another agitation in German Jewry. Einhorn, Stein, Samuel Hirsch, and others deplored the rise of the Verein as a step toward schismatic separation. The obligatory character of the rite of circumcision was the focal issue discussed by no less than forty-one rabbis. Holdheim, in his Ueber die Beschneidung zunächst in religiös-dogmatischer Beziehung (Schwerin and Berlin, 1844), takes the position that circumcision is not, like baptism, a sacrament of initiation, but is merely a command like any other. Nevertheless, he classifies it not as a national but as a Jewish law, and pleads for its retention. Indeed, he was not unreservedly an adherent of the program of the Frankfurt Reform Verein. This is clear from his Vorträge über die mosaische Religion für denkende Israeliten (Schwerin, 1844). While the Verein assumed unlimited possibilities of development, according to Holdheim the Mosaic element, after the elimination of the national, is eternal. Religion must be placed above all temporal needs and desires. To yield to the spirit of the age would make that spirit the supreme factor and lead to the production of a new 19th century Talmud as little warranted as was the Talmud of the 5th century.

Mosaism as contained in the Bible is the continuous religion of Judaism. The belief in this revelation is the constant factor in all variants of Judaism. This is also the main thesis of Das Ceremonialgesetz im Messiasreich (Schwerin and Berlin, 1845). He shows the inconsistency of Talmudism, which, assuming the inviolability of all biblical laws, still recognizes the suspension of many. Hence the Talmudic insistence on the restoration of the Jewish state. Some ceremonial laws were meant to assure the holiness of the people; others to assure that of the priests. These ceremonies lose their meaning and are rendered obsolete the moment Israel no longer requires special protection for its monotheistic distinctness. As soon as all men have become ethical monotheists, Israel is nowhere in danger of losing its own monotheism; nor is its distinctness further required. Hence in the Messianic time, the ceremonies will lose all binding or effective force. This book, too, called forth much discussion, in which Reform rabbis like Levi Herzfeld took a stand opposed to Holdheim's. Answering some of his critics' objections, Holdheim insisted upon being recognized as an adherent of positive historic Judaism. The doctrines, religious and ethical, of biblical Judaism are, he claimed, the positive contents of Judaism; and a truly historical reform must, for the sake of these positive doctrines, liberate Judaism from Talmudism.

== At rabbinical conferences and his sudden death ==
Holdheim took part in the rabbinical conferences at Braunschweig (1844), Frankfurt am Main (1845), and Breslau (1846). The stand taken by the last with regard to the Sabbath did not satisfy him. He rightly held it to be a weak compromise. For him the essential element of a true Sabbath was not worship, but rest (see his Offene Briefe über die Dritte Rabbinerversammlung, in Israelit, 1846, Nos. 46-48). The debates at these conferences had touched on vital subjects. Holdheim felt prompted to treat some of these at greater length, and therefore in quick succession he published the following essays: Was lehrt das Rabbinische Judenthum über den Eid? 1844; Ueber Auflösbarkeit der Eide, Hamburg, 1845; Vorschläge zu einer zeitgemässen Reform der jüdischen Ehegesetze, Schwerin, 1845; Die religiöse Stellung des weiblichen Geschlechts im talmudischen Judenthum, ib. 1846; Prinzipien eines dem gegenwärtigen Religionsbewusstsein entsprechenden Cultus, 1846.

Holdheim, consulted among others when the Jüdische Reformgenossenschaft was founded in Berlin, was called to be its rabbi and preacher in 1847, leaving Mecklenburg. As leader of the Reformgenossenschaft he had a share in the editing of its prayer-book. He instituted the radical rejection of keeping Saturday as the Jewish Sabbath, and instead moved its observance to Sunday to keep the behavior of Reform Jews in line with Christian thought. Under his rule, the observance of the second days of the holy days (except the second day of Rosh ha-Shanah) were abolished.

He officiated at so-called "mixed" marriages (see his Gemischte Ehen zwischen Juden und Christen, Berlin, 1850). He had to defend his congregation against many attacks (see his Das Gutachten des Herrn L. Schwab, Rabbiner zu Pesth, ib. 1848). Though engaged in many ways in the development of his society and in the organization of its institutions, during the thirteen years of his stay in Berlin he wrote a text for schools on the religious and moral doctrines of the Mishnah (Berlin, 1854), a criticism of Friedrich Julius Stahl (Ueber Stahl's Christliche Toleranz, ib. 1856), and a catechism (Jüdische Glaubens- und Sittenlehre, ib. 1857). He also wrote a history of the Reformgenossenschaft (Geschichte der Jüdischen Reformgemeinde, 1857) and a more ambitious work (in Hebrew) on the rabbinical and Karaite interpretations of the marriage laws (Ma'amar ha-Ishut, 1860).

Holdheim died suddenly at Berlin on 22 August 1860. Sachs objected to his interment in the row reserved for rabbis in the Jewish cemetery, but Oettinger granted permission for the burial. Holdheim was laid to rest among the great dead of the Berlin congregation, Abraham Geiger preaching the funeral oration.

== See also ==
- Rabbinical Conference of Brunswick
