= Hirsch Sommerhausen =

Dutch writer (1781–1853)

- Born: 22 October 1781; Niederwerrn, Electorate of Bavaria, Holy Roman Empire
- Died: 5 March 1853 (aged 71); Brussels, Belgium
- Spouse: Marianne Bing (m. 1825)
- Relatives: Isaiah Beer Bing (father-in-law)
- Writing career
- Language: Hebrew, Dutch, French, German

Tzvi Hirsch (Hartog) Sommerhausen (Hebrew: צבי הירש זומרהויזן, romanized: Tsevi Hirsh Zomerhoyzen; 22 October 1781 – 5 March 1853) was a German-born Dutch Jewish writer, poet, and translator. He was a central figure of the Haskalah in Holland.

== Biography ==
=== Early life ===
Hirsch Sommerhausen was born to Caroline (née Cohen) and Simon Sommerhausen in Niederwerrn, Franconia, where the latter was leader of the Jewish community. His father previously spent some years in Berlin, where he was acquainted with Mendelssohn, and in Holland. His mother belonged to a prominent rabbinic family.

The family relocated to Berlin around 1790, and migrated to Holland in 1797, a year after Batavian Republic emancipated its Jewish population. There Sommerhausen devoted himself to teaching Hebrew, initially in Nijmegen and from 1799 in Amsterdam. During this period he learned German, Dutch, Flemish, French, Latin, Greek, English, Italian, Spanish, Russian, Arabic, and Syriac, acquired knowledge in mathematics, physics, and chemistry, learned drawing and engraving, and became quite strong on piano and violin. In these endeavours he was mostly self-taught.

=== Career ===
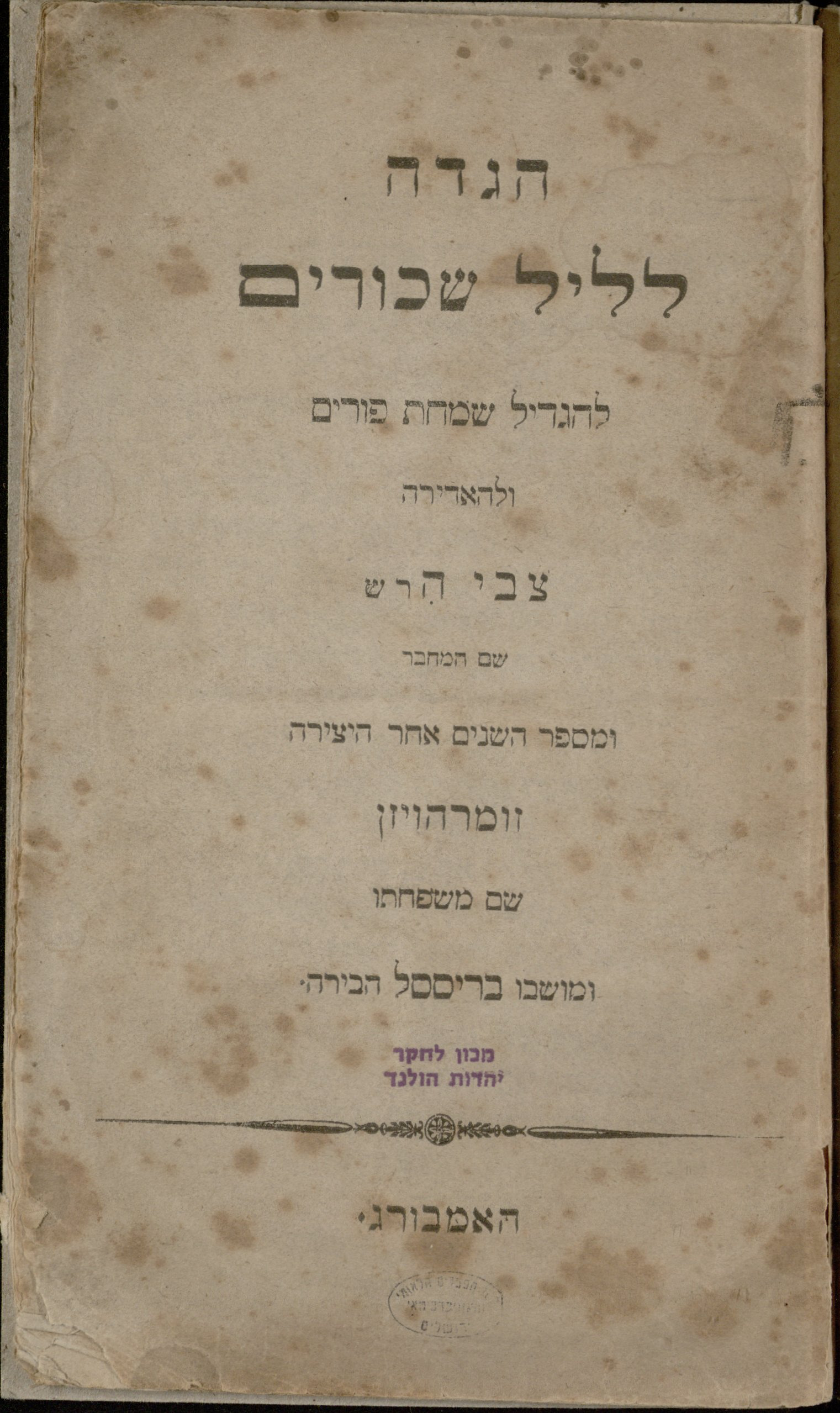
Title page of Hagadah le-leil shikorim (Hamburg, 1842).

In 1807, Sommerhausen co-founded the literary society Tot Nut en Beschaving ('For Common Welfare and Civilization'), which aimed to cultivate the arts and sciences and promote practical moral philosophy. The following year, alongside Moses Lemans, M. C. Belinfante and others, he founded the Maskilic educational society Ḥanokh la-naʿar ʿal pi darko (Dutch orthography: Chanoch Lanangar Gnal Pie Darkoo), which was dedicated to improving Jewish education and promoting the use of Dutch instead of Yiddish among Jews in Holland. The society was commissioned by Louis Napoleon to produce Dutch translations of the Tanakh and siddur.

In 1817 he settled in Brussels, where he became secretary of the main synagogue and founded a primary school for poor Jewish children with the financial support of the Rothschild banking house. He meanwhile continued to work as a private teacher for a number of prominent families, and held several public offices, including as editor of the Moniteur belge and translator of the Bulletin des lois. He lost his public functions in the aftermath of the Revolution since, though he refused to side with the Dutch in the conflict, the Belgian government considered him a Dutchman. From then on he worked only as court translator in a dozen languages at the Court of Appeal and the Supreme Tribunal.

Sommerhausen was granted a doctorate in philosophy and letters by the University of Louvain. He was a member of more than twenty learned societies, such as the Academies of Metz, Nancy, Antwerp, and Ghent, the Nordic Society of Antiquaries, and the historical academy of Utrecht. In Freemasonry he reached the 33rd degree, the highest of the Scottish Rite.

=== Death ===
Sommerhausen suffered for asthma for many years, which ended his life on 5 March 1853 at the age of 71. Henri Loeb, Chief Rabbi of Belgium, and Louis Lassen, president of the Consistoire central israélite de Belgique, delivered eulogies at his funeral.

== Selected publications ==
- Rodef mesharim (in Hebrew). Amsterdam: Y. L. Rofe. 1808. A polemical treatise on the pronunciation of Hebrew vowels and consonants, in support of Moses Lemans.
- Belinfante, Moses Cohen, ed. (1809). Bikure ḥinukh (in Hebrew). Amsterdam: Belinfante. Samples in Hebrew and Dutch, published by the Ḥanokh la-naʿar society in collaboration with several of its other members.
- Yesodot ha-Mikra. Of Hebreeuwsch spel- en leesboekje voor eerstbeginnenden (in Hebrew and Dutch). Amsterdam: Belinfante & Van Embden. 1810. Hebrew spelling and reading book with primer.
- Ḥarizum (in Hebrew and Dutch). Amsterdam. 1811. Hebrew stanzas for the wedding celebration of a friend, with a Dutch metrical translation.
- Redevoering inhoudende eene korte levensbeschrijving en den lof van Moses Mendelszoon (in Dutch). Amsterdam: J. van Embden. 1812. Biography of Moses Mendelssohn.
- Recueil des thèmes, pour faciliter l'enseignement du hollandais (in French). Vol. 1–2. Brussels. 1822.
- Shire tehillot (in Hebrew). Brussels. 1836. Poems for holidays and special occasions, approved by the rabbis for synagogue worship.
- Recueil de thèmes, d'exercices, et de versions pour faciliter l'étude de la langue flamande (in French). Vol. 1–3. Brussels: Hauman. 1839.
- Ḥitsei shenunim. Agudat mikhtamim (in Hebrew). Amsterdam: Belinfante & Van Embden. 1840. A collection of 358 satirical epigrams.
- Daat dorot. Époques de l'histoire ancienne et moderne des israélites (in Hebrew and French). Brussels: Lelong. 1842. Mnemonic poems in Hebrew and French to repeat the main points of Jewish history.
- Hagadah le-leil shikorim [Haggadah for the Night of Drunkards] (in Hebrew and Aramaic). Hamburg. 1842. A humorous parody of the Passover Haggadah for Purim. Published in at least six editions by 1907, including one with a translation into Judeo-Arabic (Algeria, 1890).
