= Bernard Bertensohn =

Russian teacher and translator (d. 1859)

- Born: Odessa, Russian Empire
- Died: 1859
- Occupations: Educator, translator

Bernard Bertensohn (died 1859) was a Russian teacher and translator.

Born in Odessa at the end of the 18th century, he received his education in the school of Basilius Stern and later worked as a teacher of languages in the city. Bertensohn contributed to the Odesski Vyestnik and other periodicals, and in 1841 translated Ludwig Philippson's novel Die Marannen into Russian.
