= Samuel Israel =

Samuel Israel may refer to:

- Sam Israel (1899–1994), American real-estate investor
- Samuel Israel III (born 1959), American convicted of hedge-fund fraud
- Samuel Israel Mulder (1792–1862), 19th-century Dutch-Jewish educationalist
