= Moses Cohen Belinfante =

Dutch journalist

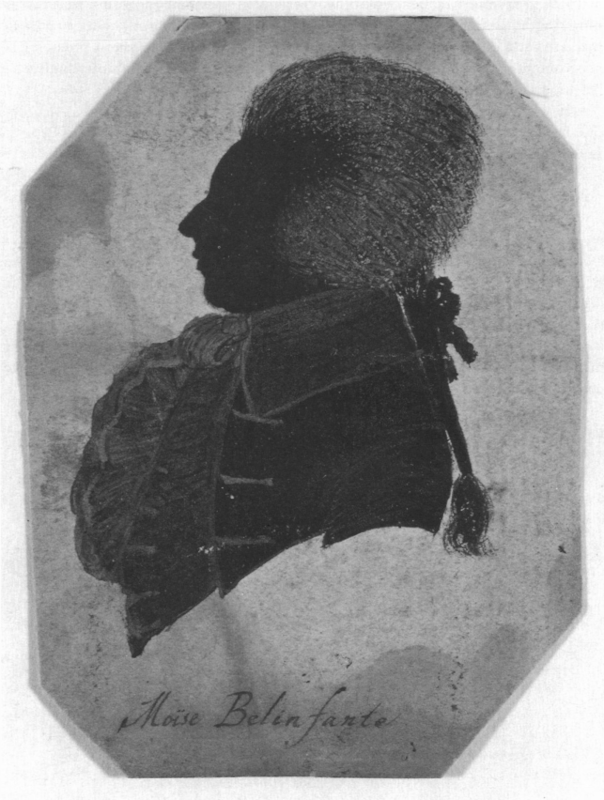
- Silhouette portrait of Belinfante (c. 1806–1810)
- Born: 24 September 1761; The Hague, Dutch Republic
- Died: 29 June 1827 (aged 65); The Hague, United Kingdom of the Netherlands
- Resting place: The Hague
- Spouse: Angela Sarah Monteira (m. 1784; died 1813)
- Writing career
- Language: Dutch

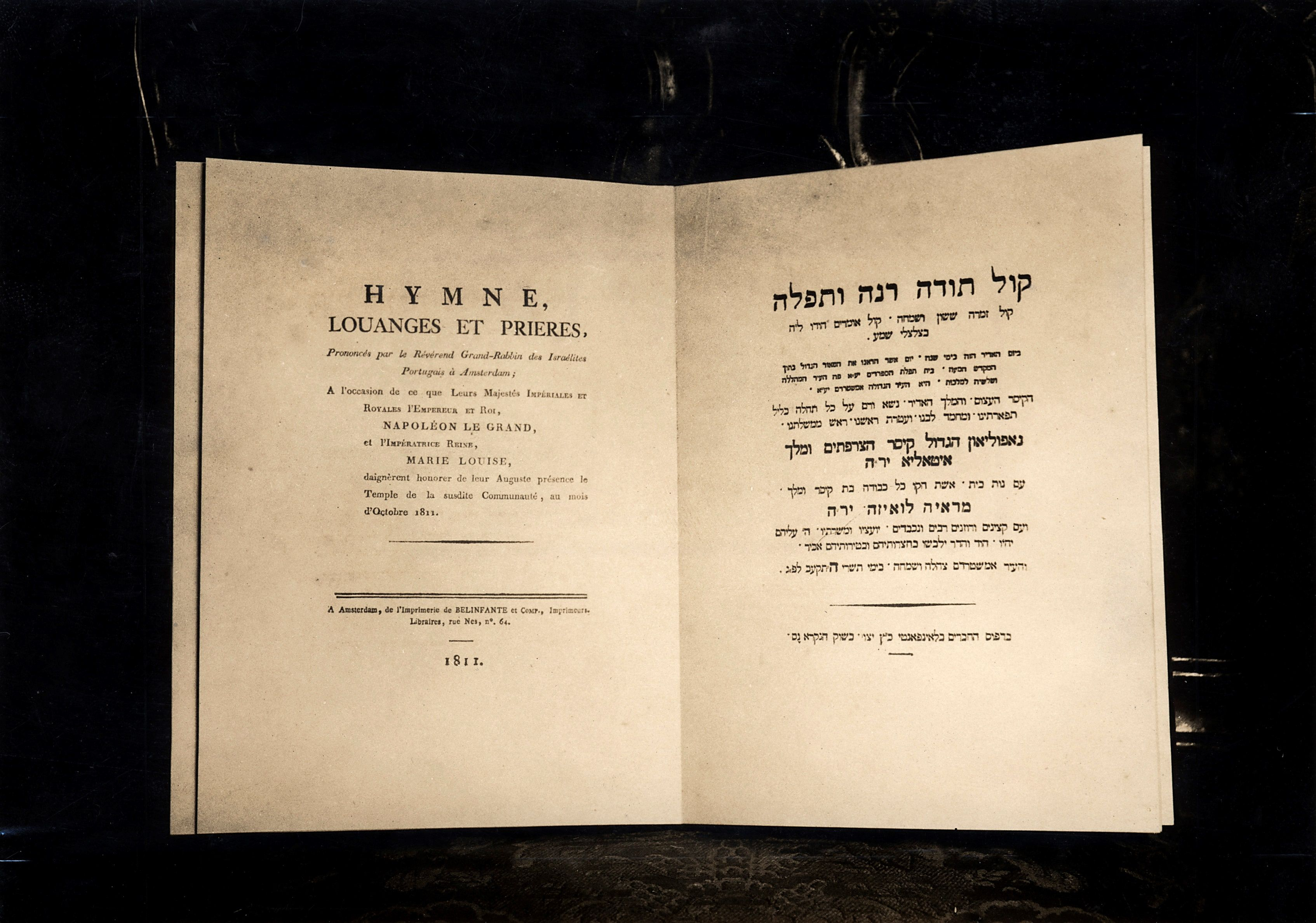
Sephardic Jewish Community's program for Napoleon published by Belinfante (1811)

Moses Cohen Belinfante (Hebrew: משה בן צדיק הכהן בלינפנטי, romanized: Moshe ben Ẓaddiḳ ha-Kohen Belinfanti; 24 September 1761 – 29 June 1827) was a Dutch journalist, translator, and schoolbook writer.

== Biography ==
Moses Cohen Belinfante was born in The Hague in 1761, the descendent of Sephardic Jews who fled Portugal during the reign of John III in 1526. His father Saddik, a cousin of Isaac Cohen Belinfante, was Chief Rabbi of the Portuguese community in Amsterdam. When he was fourteen, Belinfante was sent to Copenhagen to study medicine under his great-uncle Salomo Theophilus de Meza, but remained there only a year. He married Angela Sarah Monteira in May 1784, with whom he had three children, none of whom lived past the age of eight.

Belinfante succeeded his father as principal of the Portuguese Jewish community school after the latter's death in 1786, a position he held until his dismissal in 1795. With his brother Jacob, he founded the bookshop and publishing house Belinfante and Company in 1802. He started in 1806 the first Dutch Jewish paper, devoted especially to the interests of the Jewish community of Amsterdam. This paper was, however, discontinued in 1808.

Belinfante was a strong advocate for Jewish emancipation in the Netherlands.

== Publications ==
- Gebeden der Portugeesche Jooden, door een Joodsch Genootschap uit het Hebreeuws vertaalt [Prayers of the Portuguese Jews, translated from the Hebrew by a Jewish Society]. Vol. 1–4. The Hague: Lion Cohen. 1791–1793. Portuguese Jewish prayer books, translated into Dutch in collaboration with T. Saruco.
- Geschenk voor de Joodsche jeugd [A Gift to Jewish Youth]. 1793. Textbook for children.
- Israëlitische Almanak [Israelitic almanac]. Vol. 1–32. 1796–1827.
- Bikure ḥinukh; of Verzameling van stukken [Collection of Pieces]. Amsterdam: Belinfante & Comp. 1809.
- Aanmoediging aan de Hollandsche Israelieten tot bet betreden van de voor bun geopende loopbaan van den Krijgsdienst [Encouraging the Dutch Israelites to enter the career of military service opened up for them]. Amsterdam: Belinfante & Comp. 1809.
- Geschenk voor de israëlitische jeugd [A Gift to Israelitic Youth]. Vol. 1–4. The Hague: J. Belinfante. 1809–1834.
- Shorshe emunah; of gronden des geloofs, en zedeliijke pligten voor de Israelieten [Grounds of faith, and moral duties for the Jews]. Amsterdam: Am. Belinfante. 1816. A translation from Hebrew into Dutch of Shalom Cohen's Hebrew catechism Shorashe Emunah.
- Elementos de soletrar da lingua portugueza, para uso da escola dos pobres dos Israëlitas Portuguezes em Amsterdam [Elements of spelling of the Portuguese language, for the use of the school for the poor of the Portuguese Jews in Amsterdam]. Amsterdam: Am. Belinfante. 1816.
- Lições de Leitura Portugueza para uso da escola dos pobres dos Israelitas Portuguezes em Amsterdam [Portuguese Reading Lessons for the use of the school for poor Portuguese Jews in Amsterdam]. Amsterdam: A. Belinfante. 1816.
- Moda li-bene binah [A Friend of the Intelligent Youth]. Amsterdam: A. Belinfante. 1817. A Hebrew reader, recast from Moses Philippson's German work, with a Dutch translation and additions.
- Parabelen, Zedelijke verbalen en zedelessen, getrokken uit den Talmoed en andere geschriften der oude Rabbijnen [Parables, moral tales and moral lessons drawn from the Talmud and other writings of the ancient Rabbis]. Vol. 1–2. Amsterdam. 1822.
