= Friedrichsfeld =

Friedrichsfeld locations in Germany:

- Friedrichsfeld (Voerde), Voerde
  - Friedrichsfeld (Niederrhein) station
- Friedrichsfeld (Mannheim), Mannheim
  - Neu-Edingen/Mannheim-Friedrichsfeld station

Surname Friedrichsfeld:

- David Friedrichsfeld (1755–1810), writer

see also

- Friedrichsfelde, Berlin
