= Hartog Hertzveld =

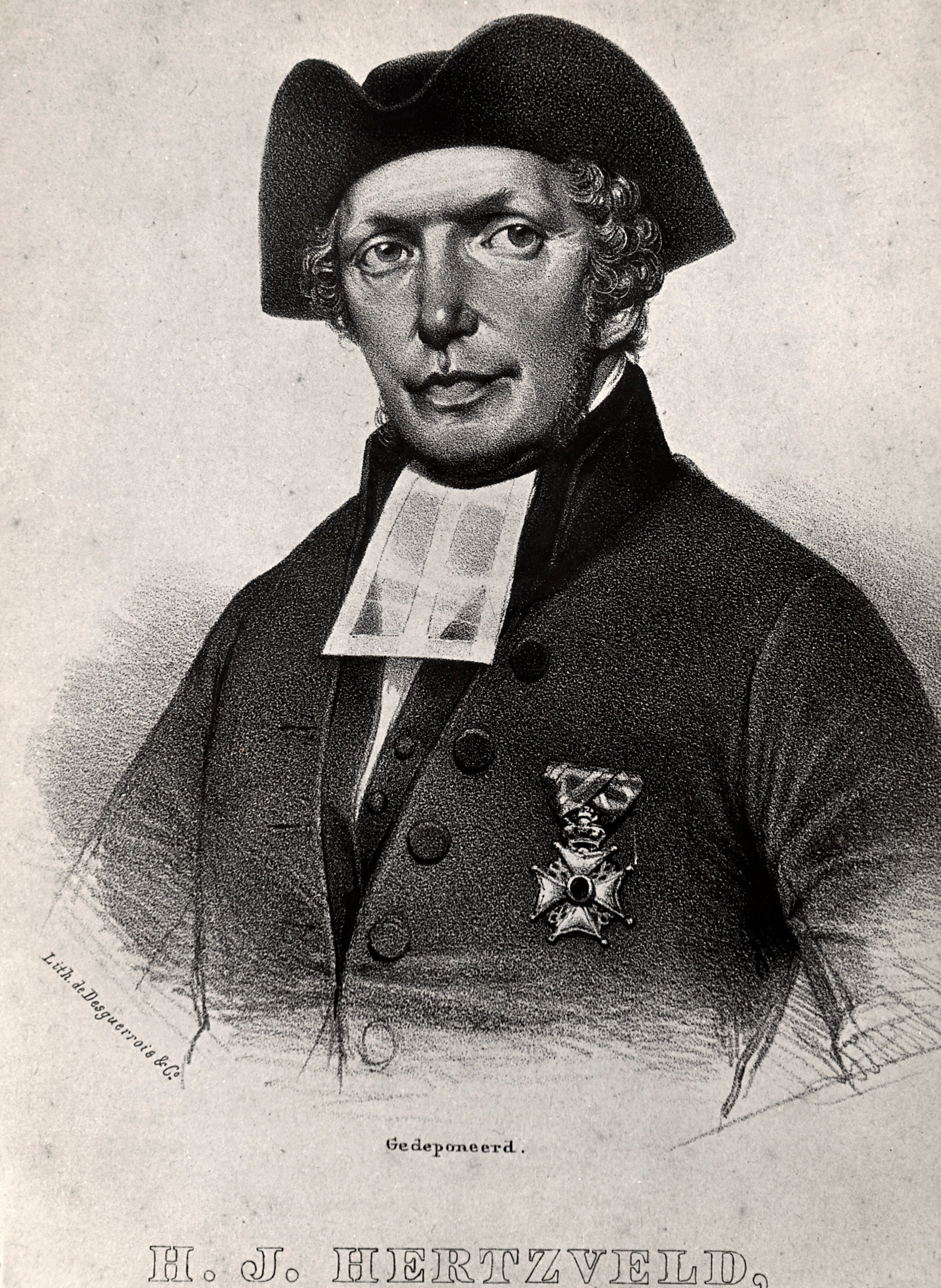

Personal life
- Born: November 19, 1781
- Died: January 30, 1864 (aged 82) Zwolle, Kingdom of the Netherlands

Religious life
- Religion: Judaism

Hartog Josua Hertzveld (November 19, 1781 – January 30, 1864) was a Dutch rabbi.

== Biography ==
Hartog Hertzveld was born in Glockau, the son of the rabbi of Königsberg. At a young age he moved to Amsterdam, where he received his education under Rabbi Löwenstamm, whose daughter he married in 1797. Hertzveld's first rabbinical appointment was in Nijkerk. In 1808, he was called to serve as rabbi of Zwolle.

Hertzveld aimed to reorganize Jewish congregations throughout Holland and to initiate reforms within the synagogue services. He is noted for delivering sermons in the Dutch language, marking a significant departure from the traditional use of Yiddish. He also advocated the introduction of confirmation ceremonies and choral singing.

He extended an invitation to his fellow rabbis to convene at a synod to discuss religious reforms. However, many of his colleagues suspected that his ideas aligned with the Reform movement that was gaining prominence in Germany at the time, and as a result, declined his invitation. To address the criticism from other rabbis, Hertzveld composed a pastoral message on March 17, 1842.

William II honoured Hertzveld with the Netherlands Lion, making him the first Dutch rabbi to receive this accolade.

== Family ==
Hartog Hertzveld's granddaughter was the Dutch poet and activist Estella Hijmans-Hertzveld.
