= Levi Herzfeld =

German rabbi and historian

Rabbi Levi Herzfeld
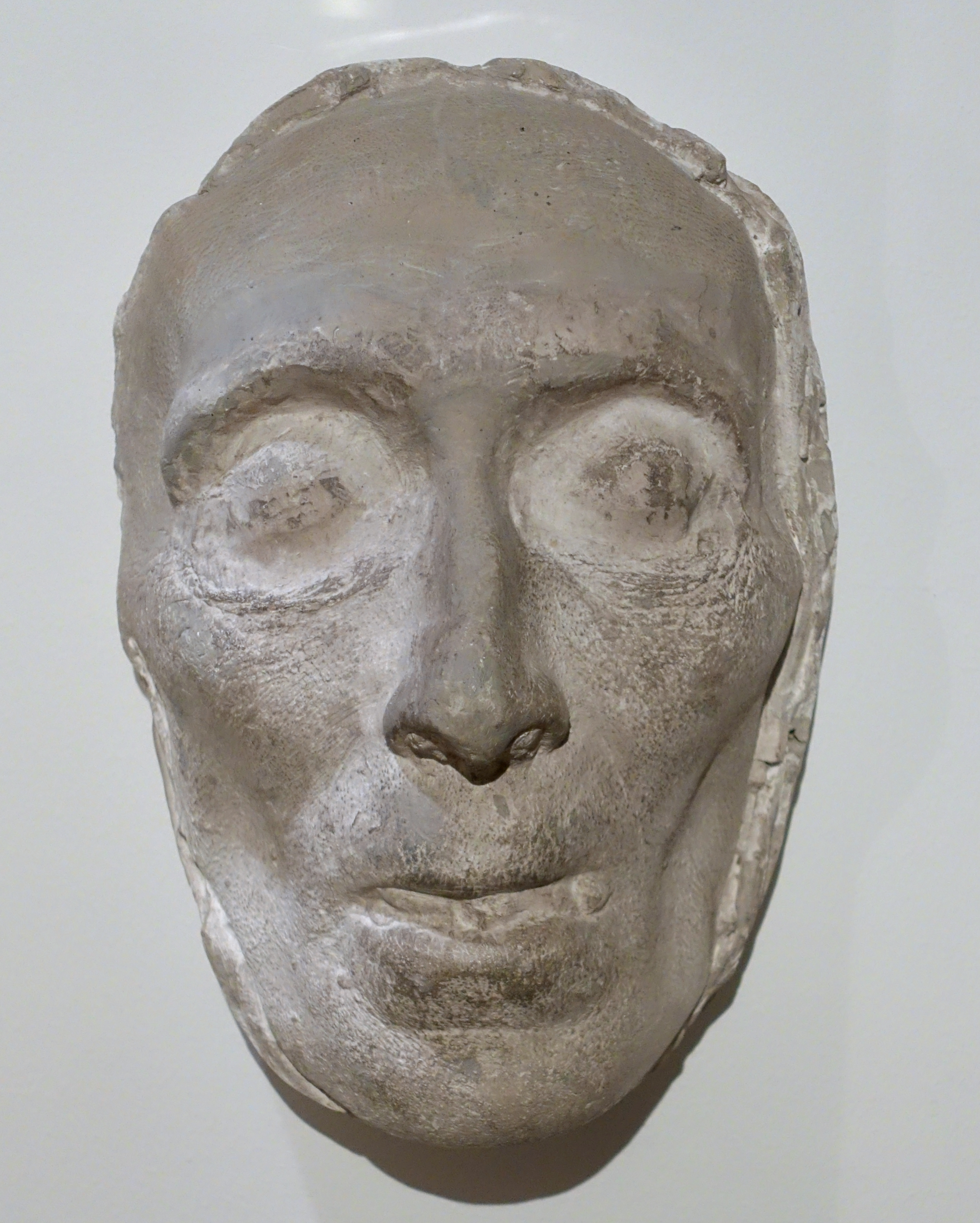
- Death mask of Levi Herzfeld, probably by Constantin Uhde, Braunschweig, 1884

Professor
- In office 1879–1884
- Title: Landesrabbiner

Personal life
- Born: 27 December 1810 Ellrich, Germany
- Died: 11 March 1884 (aged 73) Brunswick, Germany
- Notable work(s): Geschichte des Volkes Jisrael, Handelsgeschichte der Juden des Alterthums
- Known for: Advocacy for moderate Reform Judaism
- Occupation: Rabbi, historian

Religious life
- Religion: Judaism

Jewish leader
- Predecessor: Samuel Egers

Levi Herzfeld (27 December 1810, Ellrich – 11 March 1884, Brunswick) was a German rabbi and historian.

== Life ==
Having chosen the rabbinical career, he studied under Chief Rabbi Abraham Bing at Würzburg, and under District Rabbi Samuel Egers at Brunswick. In 1833 he went to the University of Berlin, at the same time completing his Talmudic studies with Rabbis Oettinger and Rosenstein, and with Leopold Zunz. Herzfeld took his degree (Ph.D.) in 1836, and shortly after was called by Egers, who had become blind, as his assistant at Brunswick. In 1842 he succeeded his master as "Landesrabbiner," retaining that office until his death. In 1879 the Duke of Brunswick conferred upon him the title of professor.

Herzfeld displayed great activity, both as rabbi and as writer. His historical works embody the results of painstaking research and show analytical power. With Ludwig Philippson he convoked the first rabbinical convention at Brunswick, where, as well as in the subsequent conventions at Frankfurt and Breslau, he advocated a moderate Reform, remaining himself a strict observer of the traditions.

== Works ==
Herzfeld's writings include:

- "Kohelet, Uebersetzt und Erläutert," Brunswick, 1838
- "Das Deutsche in der Liturgie der Braunschweiger Synagoge," 1844
- "Vorschläge zu einer Reform der Jüdischen Ehegesetze," ib. 1846
- "Geschichte des Volkes Jisrael von der Zerstörung des Ersten Tempels bis zur Einsetzung des Makkabäers Schimon zum Hohenpriester und Fürsten," 3 vols., ib. 1847 (Nordhausen, 1855–57; abridged edition, 1870)
- a volume of sermons, 1858 (2d ed. Leipsic, 1863)
- "Minḥat Zikkaron," a primer for Jewish schools, 1861 (2d ed. 1866)
- "Metrologische Voruntersuchungen zu einer Geschichte des Ibräischen, Respektive Altjüdischen Handels," ib. 1863–65
- "Zwei Vorträge über die Kunstleistungen der Alten Juden," ib. 1864
- "Handelsgeschichte der Juden des Alterthums," Brunswick, 1879, 1894
- "Einblicke in das Sprachliche der Semitischen Urzeit, Betreffend die Entstehungsweise der Meisten Hebräischen Wortstämme," Hanover, 1883.
