= Hirsch Lehren =

- Born: 1784
- Died: 1853; Amsterdam

Hirsch Lehren, also known as Tsebi Hirsch Lehren (April 1784, The Hague - September 1853, Amsterdam) was a Dutch Jewish merchant and community worker.

Lehren was prominent in the history of the Ḥaluḳḳah in the first half of the nineteenth century. Beginning with 1810, he, as a rich and influential merchant, was entrusted, together with Abraham Prinz and Solomon Reuben, with the responsibility of forwarding to Palestine the contributions which were sent annually to Amsterdam. In 1822 he ruled that in future only one representative, instead of two, should be sent from Palestine for both the Sephardic and the Ashkenazic congregations, and that the money collected for the Ḥaluḳḳah should be divided in proportion to the number of persons in the Palestinian congregations in question. In regard to this effort in Western Europe, in 1827, he was the leading force behind Amsterdam-based Pekidim ve-Amarkalim.

When, in 1829, the congregation of the Ashkenazim in Jerusalem had become involved in financial difficulties through the building of a new synagogue and school, and was obliged to appeal for support to its coreligionists in Europe, Lehren, as president of the Ḥaluḳḳah committee, prohibited in a harshly-worded circular the transmission of any further contributions to Jerusalem. On this account he was vehemently attacked, and suspicion was even cast on his integrity in administering the funds. This produced a bitter literary quarrel (see Julius Fürst in "Der Orient," 1843, pp. 361 et seq., 377 et seq.; 1844, pp. 1 et seq.; "Sendschreiben an Unsere Glaubensgenossen den 18ten Schebat, 5603"). In his defense Lehren published "Drei Briefe aus Jerusalem zur Vertheidigung der Ehrlichkeit des Amsterdamer Comité's in Betreff der Palästinaspenden" with the Hebrew title "Ḳonṭres Emet me-Ereẓ" (part i., Amsterdam, 1843; part ii., ib. 1844), after he had already published the Hebrew article of Solomon Kohen, "Emet me-Ereẓ," with the German title "Sendschreiben oder Wahrheit aus dem Heiligen Lande" (ib. 1843; Fürst, "Bibl. Jud." ii. 228).

In 1840 the oppressed Jews of Damascus appealed to Lehren for aid, as they did to many other influential Jews; and he took up their cause. Together with Abraham Prinz, Lehren sent a circular letter to many rabbis, which in the autumn of 1844 resulted in a protest, signed by seventy-eight Orthodox rabbis of Germany, Bohemia, Moravia, and Hungary, against the Rabbinical Conference of Brunswick (June 12–19, 1844; see "Univ. Isr." 1845, ii. 12 et seq.). The letters of recognition for this service, sent to Lehren and Prinz by many rabbis, were published under the title "Torat ha-Ḳena'ot" (ib. 1845).
