= Rabbinical Conference of Brunswick =

The Rabbinical Conference of Brunswick was a conference held in 1844 in Brunswick, convoked by Levi Herzfeld and Ludwig Philippson. Other attendees included Solomon Formstecher, Samuel Hirsch, Mendel Hess, Samuel Holdheim. Although he did not attend due to impending death, following the conference Áron Chorin, on his death-bed, wrote a declaration of his support of its conclusions. The following summer a synod at Frankfort-on-the-Main heard reports commissioned by the Brunswick session that dealt with various liturgical, practical, and theological topics. At this 1845 synod rabbis attending it declared that women count in a minyan, a formalization of a customary Reform practice dating back to 1811.

Responding to the various complaints raised over the centuries against the Kol Nidre, the 1844 rabbinical conference decided unanimously that the formula was not essential, and that the members of the convention should exert their influence toward securing its abolition, before the following Yom Kippur.

The conference endorsed the Grand Sanhedrin's conclusions, except that they went further in relation to inter-faith marriage, arguing that the marriage of a Jew with the adherent of any monotheistic religion is permissible in Judaism, as long as the civil law in the place of marriage permits the children of such a union to be raised in the Jewish religion.

They also decided that the oath of a Jew would be binding if it invoked the name of God, regardless of any other consideration.

Some Jews opposed the decisions of the conference; Israel Moses Hazan wrote a letter condemning the reforms advocated by it. Hirsch Lehren, circulated a letter among several rabbis, which in the autumn following the conference resulted in a protest, signed by seventy-eight Orthodox rabbis of Germany, Bohemia, Moravia, and Hungary, against the results of the conference.
