= Mendel Hess =

- Born: March 17, 1807
- Died: August 21, 1871 (aged 64)
- Occupation: Rabbi

Rabbi Mendel Hess (March 17, 1807, Lengsfeld (now Stadtlengsfeld), Saxe-Weimar - September 21, 1871, Eisenach) was a German rabbi.

== Biography ==
He was one of the first Jewish theologians to combine a university education with Talmudical training. From 1828 until his death he was chief rabbi of the grand duchy of Weimar, residing first at Lengsfeld and later at Eisenach. Although the measure had aroused great dissatisfaction among the Jews, he strictly enforced the decree of the government (June 20, 1823) ordaining that Jewish services should be conducted exclusively in the German language and that the reading in Hebrew of sections of the Bible should be followed by their translation into the vernacular.

The position of rabbi as government official became very unpleasant, as he was required to inform against those who failed to attend the services, a requirement which even the progressive Jews, who approved of the ordinance, condemned. Intermarriages between Jews and Christians being allowed in the grand duchy, Hess officially consecrated such nuptials, notwithstanding the proviso that the offspring should be brought up in the Christian faith. In the consecration of Jewish marriages he likewise ignored time-honored traditional rabbinical regulations, and it is said that in his disregard of Jewish sentiment he went so far as to attend a theater on the eve of the Day of Atonement (Allg. Zeit. des Jud., 1845, p. 62).

Hess was a member of the three rabbinical conferences which (1844–46) convened at Brunswick, Frankfort-on-the-Main, and Breslau, and as such was an advocate of uncompromising radicalism. After 1848 he felt the illiberality of enforced reforms, and petitioned the government to repeal the law which made attendance at the Reform services compulsory (Allg. Zeit. des Jud. 1853, p. 474).

He edited Der Israelit des Neunzehnten Jahrhunderts from 1839 to 1847, and, with Samuel Holdheim as co-editor, in 1847 and 1848. Hess also published two collections of sermons and addresses (Eisenach, 1839, 1843).
