= Alfred Philippson =

German geologist and geographer

- Born: 1 January 1864; Bonn, Kingdom of Prussia
- Died: 28 March 1953 (aged 89); Bonn, West Germany
- Occupation(s): geologist and geographer
- Awards: Gustav-Steinmann-Medaille (1947)

Alfred Philippson (1 January 1864 – 28 March 1953) was a German geologist and geographer. He was born at Bonn, son of Ludwig Philippson. He received his education at the gymnasium and university of his native town and at the University of Leipzig (Ph.D. 1886). In 1892 he became Privatdozent at Bonn, was appointed assistant professor seven years later, and in 1904 he was called to Bern as professor of geography. Having made voyages through Italy (Apulia region), Greece, Turkey, and Asia Minor, he published: Studien über Wasserscheiden, Berlin, 1886; Der Peloponnes, ib. 1892; Europa (with Neumann), Leipzig, 1894; Thessalien und Epirus, Berlin, 1897; Beiträge zur Kenntnis der Griechischen Inselwelt, Gotha, 1901; Das Mittelmeergebiet, Leipzig, 1904. He also published essays in the technical journals, such as Das fernste Italien. Geographische Reiseskizzen und Studien, Leipzig, 1925, and Apulien, Netherlands, 1937.

Since 1887 Philippson undertook, on a commission from the Berlin Akademie der Wissenschaften, an annual journey to Asia Minor for the purpose of geological investigation. His chief object in these excursions was to study, on a geological basis, the phenomena of the earth's surface both in their interrelationship and in their influence on the human race.

As a Jew, he lost his position under the Nazis. He tried without success to relocate to the US through his cousin Ernst Alfred Philippson. During the war, he was sent to the Theresienstadt concentration camp (1942–45), where he wrote a memoir on his scholarly activity (Wie ich zum Geographen wurde, partly published in 1996). He survived the war in part thanks to the support of his friend, Sven Hedin, resuming work on his multi-volume essay on the Greek landscapes (with E. Kirsten; posthumously published and continued by Kirsten).
