= Samuel Israel Mulder =

Dutch-Jewish educationalist (1792 – 1862)

Samuel Israel Mulder (born Amsterdam 20 June 1792; died 29 December 1862) was a Dutch-Jewish educationalist.

He was educated by his father, David Friedrichsfeld, and then studied with his brother-in-law, H. A. Wagenaar. His friends were Lemans, Somerhausen, and Ullman, all of them members of the circle Tongeleth, who applied themselves to the study of the Hebrew language. Mulder composed at this time a Hebrew romance, "Beruria," and a psalm (see Delitzsch, "Zur Geschichte der Jüdischen Poesie," Leipzig, 1836).

Mulder was also a member of Tot Nut en Beschaving, in the works of which many of his essays appeared. In 1812, Mulder became a Sabbath-school teacher; in 1817, a sworn translator at the tribunal; in 1835, inspector of religious schools; and in 1849, secretary of the Amsterdam congregation. From 1826 Mulder was regent (director) of the theological seminary Sa'adat Baḥurim, which was reformed by him and which became in 1836 an institution subsidized by the state. Mulder was nominated its regent-secretary for life.

Mulder's reputation is chiefly due to his translation of the Bible, especially of the Pentateuch, Psalms, and Book of Proverbs, that was first published in 1824 and has often been reprinted; it was the first translation into Dutch from the Hebrew. In collaboration with Lehmans he published (1825–31) the dictionary entitled "Nederlandsch-Hebreeuwsch Handwoordenboek" (2 vols.). In 1843 he began his "Bijbel voor de Israelietische Jeugd", which he finished in 1854 (17 vols.; translated into English by Perez of Philadelphia). In addition he published many books on the study of Hebrew, e.g.: "Chronologisch Handboekje," 1836; "Rudimenta" (a revision of Lehman), 1840; "Aardrijkskunde van het Heilig. Land," 1840; "Leesboekje," 1846; "Moreh Derek," 1861. Most of his essays and contributions to periodicals he collected in his "Verspreide Lettervruchten", 1844.

In 1843 the University of Giessen conferred upon Mulder the degree of Ph.D., and in 1860 he was decorated with the Order of the Netherlands Lion.
