= Samuel Hirsch =

German rabbi (1815–1889)

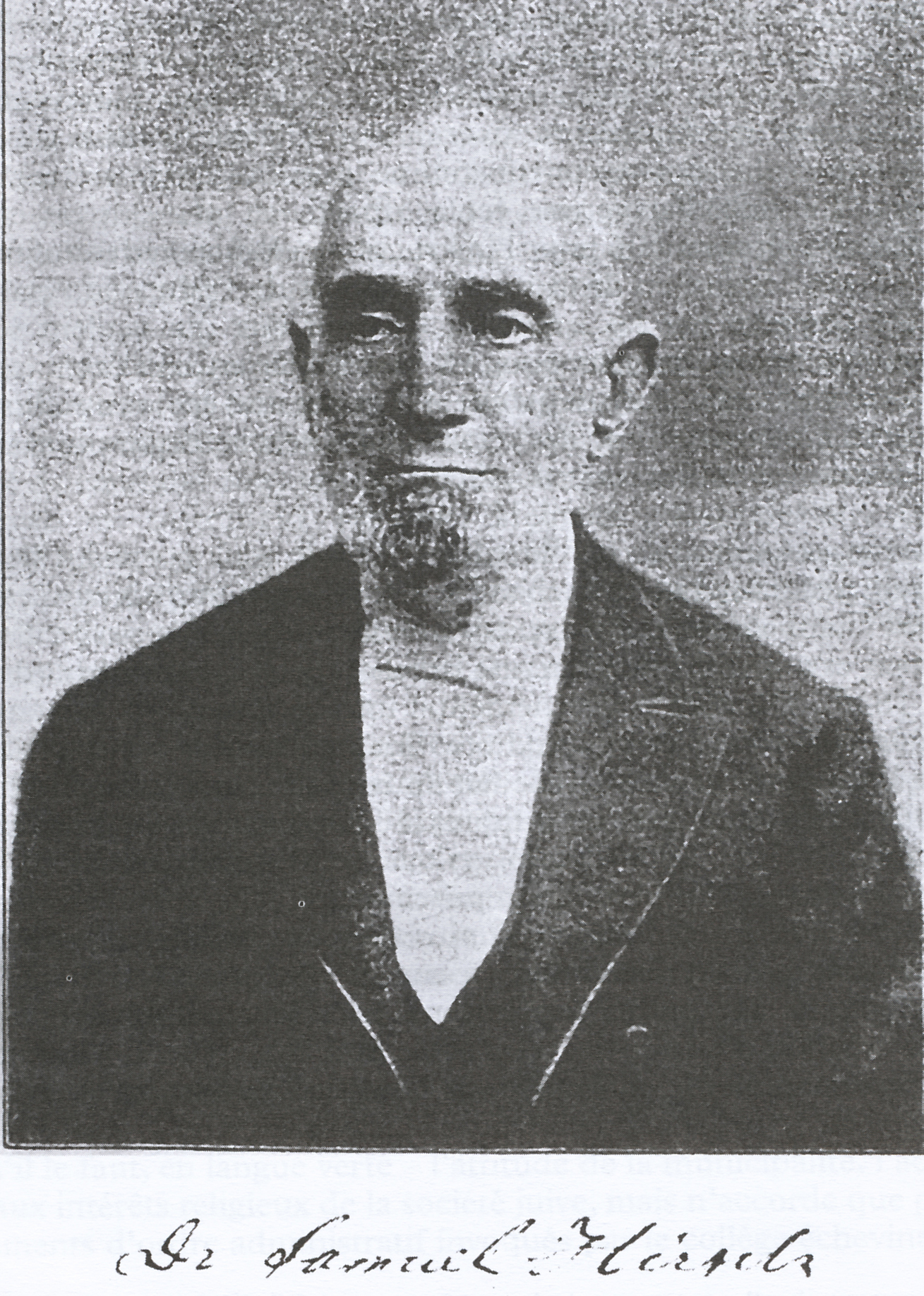
Samuel Hirsch

Samuel Hirsch (June 8, 1815 – May 14, 1889) was a major Reform Judaism philosopher and rabbi who mainly worked and resided in present-day Germany in his earlier years. He promoted the radical German Reform Judaism movement and published several works in the 1840s. He moved to the United States in 1866 where he would die in Chicago, Illinois in 1889.

== Biography ==
Born in Thalfang (in modern-day Rhineland-Palatinate, Germany; formerly part of Prussia), he received his training at Metz. He attended the University of Bonn, the University of Berlin, and the University of Leipzig.

He first became rabbi at Dessau in 1838 but was forced to resign in 1841 because he promoted a radically liberal form of Judaism, later to become known as classic German Reform Judaism. In 1843 he published his "Die Messias-Lehre der Juden in Kanzelvorträgen" and "Religionsphilosophie der Juden."

In 1843 he was appointed chief rabbi of the Grand Duchy of Luxembourg by King William II of the Netherlands. During this period he published his "Die Humanität als Religion." He took an active part in the annual rabbinical conferences held at Brunswick (1844), Frankfurt am Main (1845), and Breslau (1846). In 1844 he published his "Reform im Judenthum."

Having received a call from the Reform Congregation Keneseth Israel, Philadelphia, Pennsylvania, in 1866, he resigned his post in Europe and moved to the United States. There he succeeded Dr. David Einhorn. From his arrival onward he became closely identified with, and an open advocate of the radical reform movement. In 1869 he was elected president of the rabbinical conference held in Philadelphia, at which the principles of Reform Judaism were formulated. In that year he engaged also in numerous ritual and doctrinal controversies.

Hirsch remained officiating rabbi of the Philadelphia congregation for 22 years, resigning in 1888, after having spent 50 years of his life in the ministry. Moving to Chicago, he took up his abode there with his son, philosopher and rabbi Prof. Emil G. Hirsch. During his rabbinate in Philadelphia Hirsch organized the Orphans' Guardian Society, and was the founder of the first branch in the United States of the Alliance Israélite Universelle.

Hirsch is best known as the author of the "Religionsphilosophie," a work written from the Hegelian point of view, but for the purpose of vindicating the claim of Judaism to the rank denied it by Hegel, the rank of an "absolute religion." In this book he proved himself to be an original thinker (see "Allg. Zeit. des Jud." 1895, pp. 126 et seq.). His "Katechismus der Israelitischen Religion" was also constructed on original lines; he considered the Biblical legends to be psychological and typical allegories, and the ceremonies of Judaism to be symbols of underlying ideas. From this attitude his Reform principles are derived. He denied that Judaism is a law; it is Lehre ("teaching" or "lore") but is expressed in symbolic ceremonies that may be changed in accordance with historic development.

He was the first to propose holding Jewish services on Sunday instead of the traditional Jewish Sabbath Shabbat.

He contributed to the early volumes of The Jewish Times (1869–1878). His principal works were first issued in Germany, among them What is Judaism? (1838), a collection of sermons (1841), and Religious Philosophy of the Jews (1843). He published nothing in book form after coming to the United States.
