= Isaac Cohen Belinfante =

Dutch poet and bibliophile

- Born: c. 1720
- Died: 7 September 1781; Amsterdam, Dutch Republic
- Writing career
- Pen name: Pi ha-Medabber
- Language: Hebrew

Isaac Cohen Belinfante (Hebrew: יצחק בן אליהו חזקיהו הכהן בלינפנטי, romanized: Yitzḥak ben Eliyahu Ḥizkiyahu ha-Kohen Belinfanti; c. 1720 – 7 September 1781) was poet, bibliophile, and darshan in Amsterdam. He traced his ancestry to Joseph Cohen Belinfante, a fugitive from Portugal to Turkey in 1526.

== Work ==
Belinfante's printed works include Minḥat Nedavah ('A Free Offering'; Amsterdam, 1764), a poem in honour of the poet David Franco Mendes; Gilah ve-Ranen ('Joy and Singing'; Amsterdam, 1777), an epithalamium; Ḥinah ('Lamentation'; Amsterdam, 1768), elegies on the destruction of the Temple, inserted in the prayer-book Mishmerot ha-Layelah; two sermons in Portuguese, Sermão do Nada Moral (Amsterdam, 1761) and Sermão Moral Sobre o Temor Heroyco (Amsterdam, 1767); and a number of Hebrew odes (shirim), which are printed in other works written and published at Amsterdam.

Among his works which remained in manuscript are Shefer Tehillim ('The Beauty of the Psalms'), poems on the preachers of Amsterdam; Ateret Paz ('The Golden Crown'), a collection of 87 satirical poems; Berit Kehunat Yitzḥak ('Alliance of the Priesthood of Isaac'), poems in honour of his friends; Avne Segullah ('Precious Stones'), a collection of poems dedicated to some fellow writers; Siaḥ Yitzḥak ('The Prayer of Isaac'), a catalogue of printed books and manuscripts, with extracts and biographical notes on the authors, especially the Spanish and Portuguese Jewish writers of London and Amsterdam. A specimen of his work was published by Gabriel Polak in Ha-Maggid (1869, nos. 10 and 11).

From one of his poems, Kinyan Torah ('The Possession of the Law'), it appears that Belinfante wrote many works on Talmud, grammar, ethics, Kabbalah, and philosophy. He revised the siddur of the Sephardic rite printed at Amsterdam, 1726, by S. Rodrigues Mendes, and other works printed in that city.
