= Carel Godfried Withuys =

Dutch writer and poet

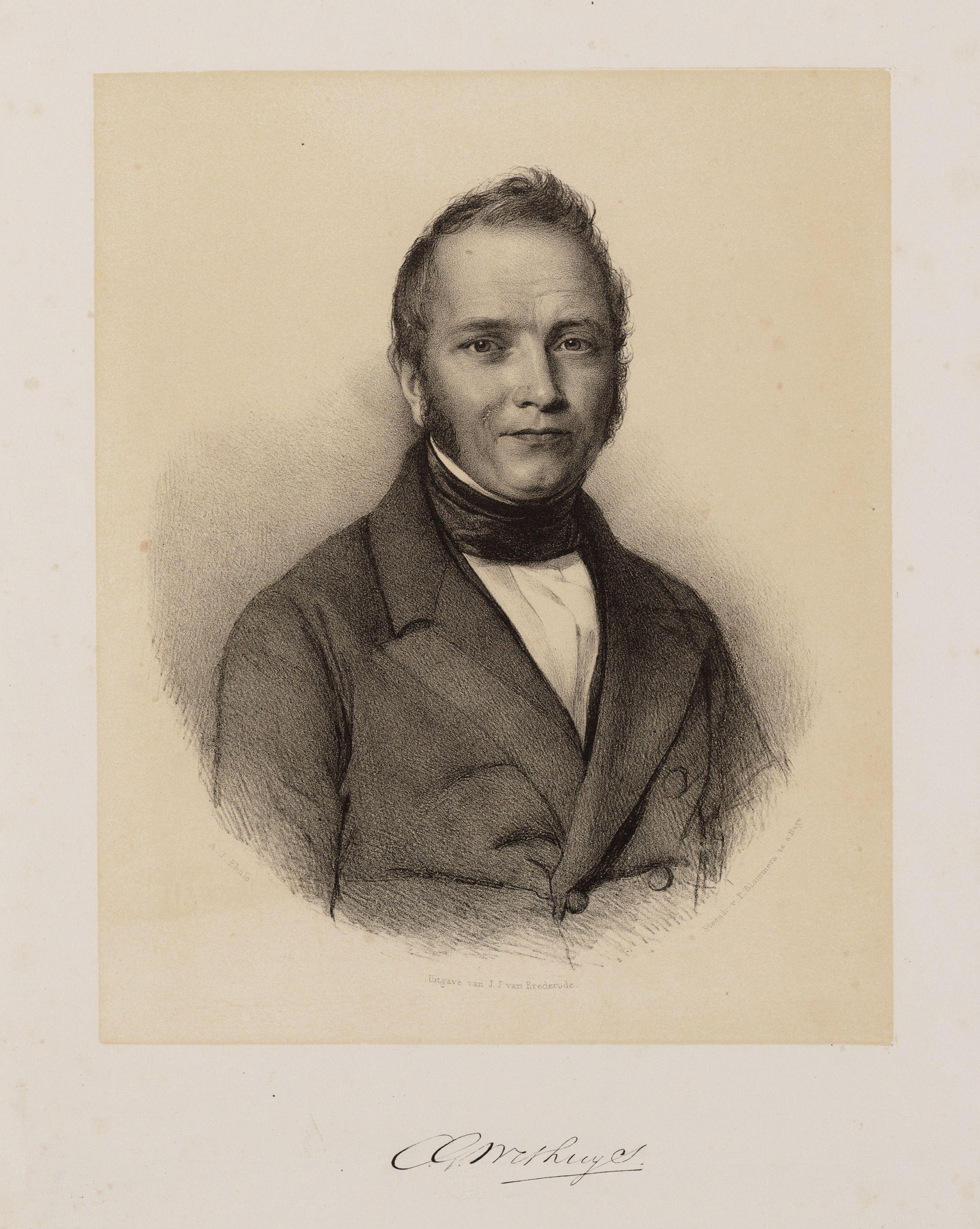
- Born: 2 May 1794; Amsterdam, Netherlands
- Died: 14 February 1865 (aged 70); The Hague, Netherlands
- Writing career
- Language: Dutch

Carel Godfried Withuys (2 May 1794, Amsterdam - 14 February 1865, The Hague) was a Dutch writer and poet. Much of his work was patriotic in nature, especially during and after the Belgian Revolution of 1830.

== Bibliography ==
- De slag bij Quatre Bras (1815)
- Drietal krijgsliederen (1830)
- Aan Holland (1831)
- Het bombardement van Antwerpen (1831)
- Hollands vlag (1831)
- Gedichten (1833)
- Bekroonde volksliederen, uitgegeven door de Maatschappij tot Nut van 't Algemeen (1835)
- Cantate, ter gelegenheid der viering van het vijftigjarig bestaan van het Amsterdamsche eerste departement der Maatschappij tot Nut van 't Algemeen (1835)
- Gedenkboek van 1830-1831 (1856)
- Verhalen, romancen en vertellingen (1863)
