= Moses Philippson =

Jewish writer, teacher, translator, and publisher in Germany

Moses Philippson (born May 9, 1775, in Sandersleben; died April 20, 1814, in Dessau) was a Jewish writer, teacher, translator, and publisher. He significantly contributed to the spread of the German language among Jews and promoted the connection with German culture through his Bible translations, commentaries, and writings.

== Life ==
=== Early life ===
Moses Philippson was born into a Jewish family from Krakow, known for its many scholars, rabbis, educators, journalists, doctors, bankers, and scientists. The family's lineage traces back to the 16th century to Rabbi Joshua Hoeschel ben Joseph (ca. 1578–1648). His father, Philipp Moses (or Phoebus ben Moses Arnswald), a wandering scholar from Arnswalde, came to Sandersleben, married the shoemaker's daughter Rebecca Loeb, and settled as a small trader and peddler. The couple had six children. Moses, the eldest, attended the Yeshiva (Talmudic high school) in Halberstadt at twelve and later studied the Talmud in Braunschweig and Frankfurt (Oder).

=== Teacher, Writer, and Publisher ===
Since 1799, Philippson taught at the Jewish Franzschule in Dessau, where independent work and thinking were encouraged in the spirit of the Enlightenment. Alongside, he began his writing career and founded a printing press for Hebrew books. He printed Bible translations in German using Hebrew letters. His most famous work was the textbook "Kinderfreund und Lehrer" (Children's Friend and Teacher), published in two parts in 1808 and 1811.

=== Later years ===
Moses Philippson died on April 20, 1814, in Dessau from typhus before he could complete his German-Hebrew lexicon. His grave on the Jewish cemetery is no longer locatable.

Among his five children, the following became well-known:

- Phöbus Moses Philippson (1807–1870), German physician and writer
- Ludwig Philippson (1811–1889), German writer and rabbi

== Works ==
- 1804 J. Eiche: "Proverbs of Solomon and Stories from the Talmud and Midrash." Translator.
- 1804 "Twelve Minor Prophets." Translator, commentator, and editor.
- 1808/1811 "Kinderfreund und Lehrer. A Teaching and Reading Book for the Youth of the Jewish Nation and for Every Lover of the Hebrew Language." 2 parts.
- "The New Collector." Magazine. As editor.

== Literature ==
- Phöbus Philippson: "Biographical Sketches", Leipzig 1864. Reprint by the Moses Mendelssohn Society. Bernd G. Ulbrich (Ed.), Dessau 2007
- Astrid Mehmel: "Philippson, Scholarly Family." In: New German Biography (NDB), Vol. 20, pp 395ff, Berlin 2001.
- Meyer Kayserling: "Ludwig Philippson. A Biography." Leipzig 1898.
- Johanna Philippson: "The Philippsons, a German-Jewish Family 1775-1933." In: Year Book VII of the Leo Baeck Institute, London 1961.
- Ludwig Philippson Family Collection, 1810–1989. Center for Jewish History.
