= David Friedrichsfeld =

German-Jewish writer

David Friedrichsfeld (c. 1755 – 19 February 1810) was a German-Jewish writer in German and Hebrew.

Friedrichsfeld was born in Berlin, where he absorbed the scholarship and ideas of the Meassefim. In 1781 he went to Amsterdam, where he was one of the leaders in the fight for the emancipation of the Jews, writing in the promotion of this cause his Beleuchtung ... das Bürgerrecht der Juden Betreffend, Amsterdam, 1795, and Appell an die Stände Hollands, etc., ib., 1797. He died in Amsterdam in 1810.

Besides contributing to the "Ha-Meassef," he wrote "Ma'aneh Rak," on the pronunciation of Hebrew among the Sephardim (being also a defence of Moses Lemans' "Imrah Ẓerufah," Amsterdam, 1808); and "Zeker Ẓaddiḳ," a biography of Hartwig Wessely, ib. 1809. Some of his works are still in manuscript (comp. Steinschneider, "Verzeichnis der Hebr. Handschriften der Königl. Bibliothek zu Berlin," ii., No. 255, pp. 110 et seq.).
