= Moses Lemans =

Dutch-Jewish Hebraist and mathematician

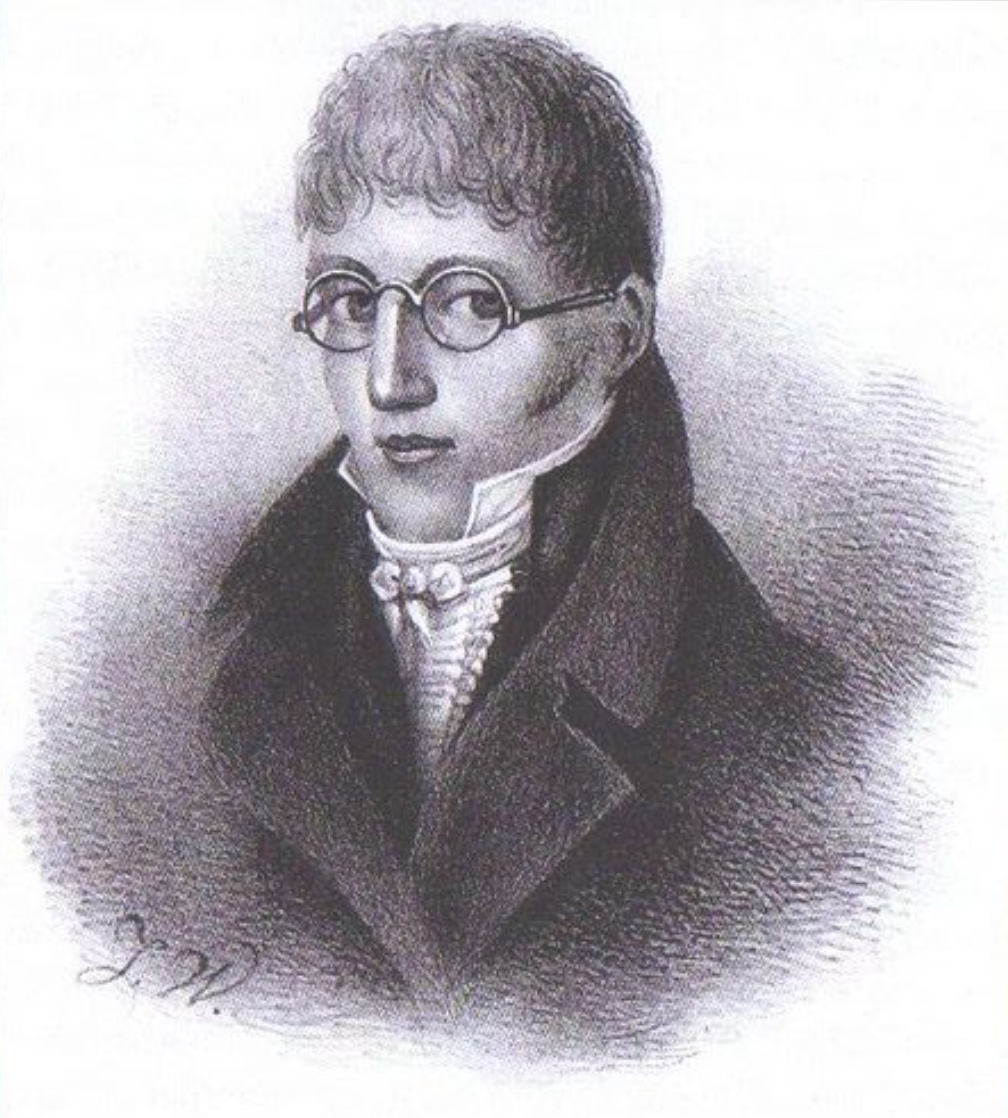
- Born: November 5, 1785; Naarden, Netherlands
- Died: October 17, 1832 (aged 46); Amsterdam, Netherlands

Moses Lemans (November 5, 1785, Naarden, Netherlands – October 17, 1832, Amsterdam, Netherlands) was a Dutch-Jewish Hebraist and mathematician, and a leader of the Haskalah movement in Holland. He was a founder of the Jewish Mathematicians' Association, Mathesis Artium Genetrix, and published a number of works on Hebrew grammar and mathematics.

Born in Naarden, Lemans was educated by his father and (in mathematics) by Judah Littwack. He helped found Hanokh la na'ar al pi darkho, a society for reform in Jewish education, for which he published a number of Hebrew textbooks. In 1818 he was appointed head of the first school for needy Jews in Amsterdam, and in 1828 teacher of mathematics in the Amsterdam gymnasium.

== Works ==
In 1808 he published Ma'amar Imrah Ẓerufah (Article on Pure Speech), in which he advocated for the abandonment of Ashkenazi pronunciation of Hebrew in favour of the Sephardi one, and some years later a Hebrew grammar, Rudimenta (1820). In collaboration with Samuel Israel Mulder he published a Hebrew-Dutch dictionary in 1829-1831. The most notable of his Hebrew poems is an epic on the Belgian Revolution.

Lemans was also involved in efforts to propagate among Jews of the Netherlands a knowledge of the Dutch language, by translating prayer-books into Dutch.
