= Ludwig Philippson =

German rabbi

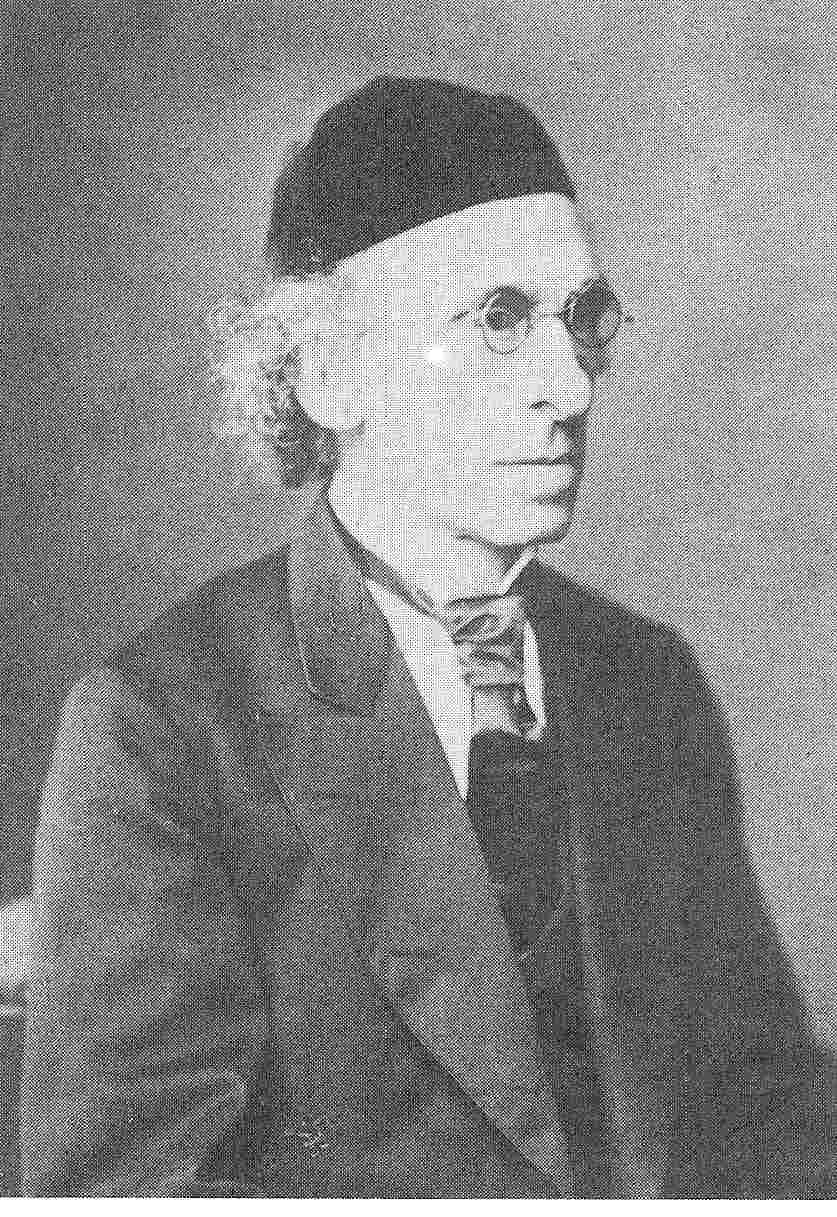
- Born: 28 December 1811; Dessau
- Died: 29 December 1889 (aged 78); Bonn, German Empire
- Children: Alfred Philippson

Ludwig Philippson (28 December 1811 – 29 December 1889) was a German rabbi and author.

== Early life and education ==
Ludwig Philippson was born in Dessau, the son of Moses Philippson, a printer, writer, teacher, translator, publisher and a member of the Haskalah. He was educated at the gymnasium of Halle where his older brother Phöebus was studying medicine. Luwig published his first effort (published under his brother's name), a translation of the prophets Hosea, Joel, Obadiah, and Nahum, when he was fifteen years old.

1839 saw him continuing his education at the University of Berlin with a major in classical philology. As scholarships were not available to Jews and the family had exhausted their funds on educating Phöebus in medicine, Ludwig supported himself by tutoring and by doing literary work (some which became published).

== Career ==
In 1830 he translated and annotated the works of two Judæo-Greek poets of Alexandria. A philological treatise on medical terms (Hyle Anthropine, 1831, etc.) which revealed his qualities as a scholar, and his versatility was emphasized by the publication in 1832 of a vindication of Spinoza.

After graduating the University of Berlin at the age of 22 in 1833, he was invited to be a rabbi for the Magdeburg Jewish congregation. He was to remain in Magdeburg for the next 28 years.

After being introduced to the Wolffstein family of five daughters in Magdeburg, he married the youngest, Julianne Wolffstein, in 1836. They were to have 3 daughters: Johanna, Bertha (1839) and Rosalie (1840). A son, Emil, was born in 1843 but died later in 1845.

In 1837 he founded the Allgemeine Zeitung des Judenthums (subtitled “a non-partisan organ for all Jewish interests”) in order to promote the interests of Judaism. It was the longest continuously published Jewish newspaper in Germany. Allgemeine is “German Jewry’s most important newspaper,” and is one of the most frequently cited sources of nineteenth-century German Jewry. Allgemeine merged with the CV-Zeitung, the official publication of the Central Association of German Jews until the Nazis closed it down in November 1938. The content of Allgemeine would be Jewish enlightenment and reform, the place of Jews in society and their emancipation. However, after the 1871 Unification of Germany and the establishment of the German Empire, Allgemeine began to respond to the pernicious increase in anti-Semitism. Philippson would continue to edit that journal until his death in 1889.

Two years later (1839) he began an annotated German translation of the Hebrew Bible, which he completed in 1853. It was yet another German-Jewish translation of the Bible, one of perhaps 20 dating back to the Moses Mendelssohn translation of 1780. The differences in the version created by Philippson was in that each page had the original Hebrew text in one column with a German translation in another column, each page contained a textual explanation, not only with a commentary on the biblical material but also a cultural commentary. Most notably in one version were illustrations by Gustave Doré with his English wood engravings - something shocking in a Hebrew Bible that forbids such images of animals, temples, pagan ruins and gods and much more. In keeping with the philosophy of his father Moses Philippson, a committed member of the Jewish intellectual movement Haskala dedicated to overcoming Jewish ignorance and religious formalism, Luwig's intention was that the bible would help to extend the minds of the Jewish readers to a wider world of experiences, lands, history.

Sigmund Freud’s father, Jakob, knew the Hebrew Bible by heart and was a life long student of the Talmud. He eventually became influenced by the Jewish Enlightenment and subscribed to the publications of Ludwig and Phöebus Philippson. He substituted his classic Hebrew Bible with the illustrated and annotated version of the Hebrew/German Ludwig Philippson’s Bible. This was the Bible he used to teach his son. When Freud was 35, his father had the Bible rebound and presented it to his son with the hope that he would return to the faith. There has been some discussion about how the Philippson Bible and the illustrations influenced Freud's collection of antiquities and the development of his intellectual pursuits.

Julianne Philippson died in 1843 of lung tuberculosis. Ludwig married again in 1844 to Mathilde Hirsch, the sister of the wife of his brother Julius. They were to have six children: Joseph (1840), Franz (1851), Richard (1853), Martin (1856), Alfred (1864).

In 1847 he published Die Entwickelung der Religiösen Idee im Judenthum, Christenthum und Islam, which was followed by Die Religion der Gesellschaft, in 1848. Both of these works were translated into several languages.

Ludwig was elected in 1848 for his region of Saxony to the Frankfurt National Assembly. The very next year he became a member of the Saxony trade council.

On Feb. 12, 1855 Philippson published an article in Allgemeine proposing that a Jewish publication society be established. This led to the creation of the Institut zur Förderung der isralitischen Literatur in Leipzig in May of that year. It started with a subscriber membership of 1200 and increasing to over 2000 by the end of the year. This entitled the member to copies of works published that year that had been selected by a committee consisting of Ludwig Philippson, Adolph Jellinek of Leipzig, and Isaac Markus Jost of Frankfort-on-the-Main (for which the authors received an honoraria).

That year the Austrian government prohibited anyone from become a member of the society and in 1858, while Philippson himself was on tour in Milan when he was expelled from Austrian territory. Through the efforts of Ludwig, the society was to last another 18 years (with a membership as high 3000) and to publish eighty works in German on topics such Jewish history, science, poetry, fiction and biographies - including works by Ludwig and his brother Phöebus.

== Later years ==
With poor health and failing eye-sight Ludwig was forced surrender his position as Rabbi in Magdeburg in 1862. He moved his family to Bonn where they first took up residence on the first floor of a gardener's house. The following year he purchased a residence on Grünen Weg, what now known as Königstrasse, where he would remain for twenty five year until his death. A further three generations would live in this house until it was taken by the Nazis.

In Bonn he continued to write historical novels and dramatic, religious, and historical works, prayer books, essays and to comment of political issues like the social status of Jews and their emancipation. He would continue with his role of editor of the Allgemeine. He was involved in the local Jewish community, supporting the building of a new synagogue and the establishment of a new Jewish graveyard - he, his wife Mathilde and many of his children and grandchildren would eventually be buried in this graveyard.

== See also ==
- Rabbinical Conference of Brunswick

== Literature ==
- Johanna Philippson: The Philippsons, a German-Jewish Family 1775–1933. In: Leo Baeck Institute Yearbook , 7, 1962, p. 95–118
- George Y. Kohler: Ludwig Philippson on Biblical Monotheism: Jewish Religious Philosophy between Mendelssohn and Hermann Cohen, in: Jewish Historiography between Past and Future. 200 Years of Wissenschaft des Judentums, ed. Paul Mendes-Flohr, Rachel Livneh-Freudenthal, and Guy Miron, de Gruyter, NY 2019, p. 181-196.
- Michah Gottlieb: Scripture and Separatism: Politics and the Bible Translations of Ludwig Philippson and Samson Raphael Hirsch, in: Deutsch-jüdische Bibelwissenschaft, ed. Daniel Vorpahl, Sophia Kähler, Shani Tzoref, de Gryuter 2019, 57-76.
- Elias S. Jungheim: “On the humanism of the religious idea Ludwig Philippsons confrontation with Christianity”, in Leo Baeck Institute Yearbook.
