= Joel (given name) =

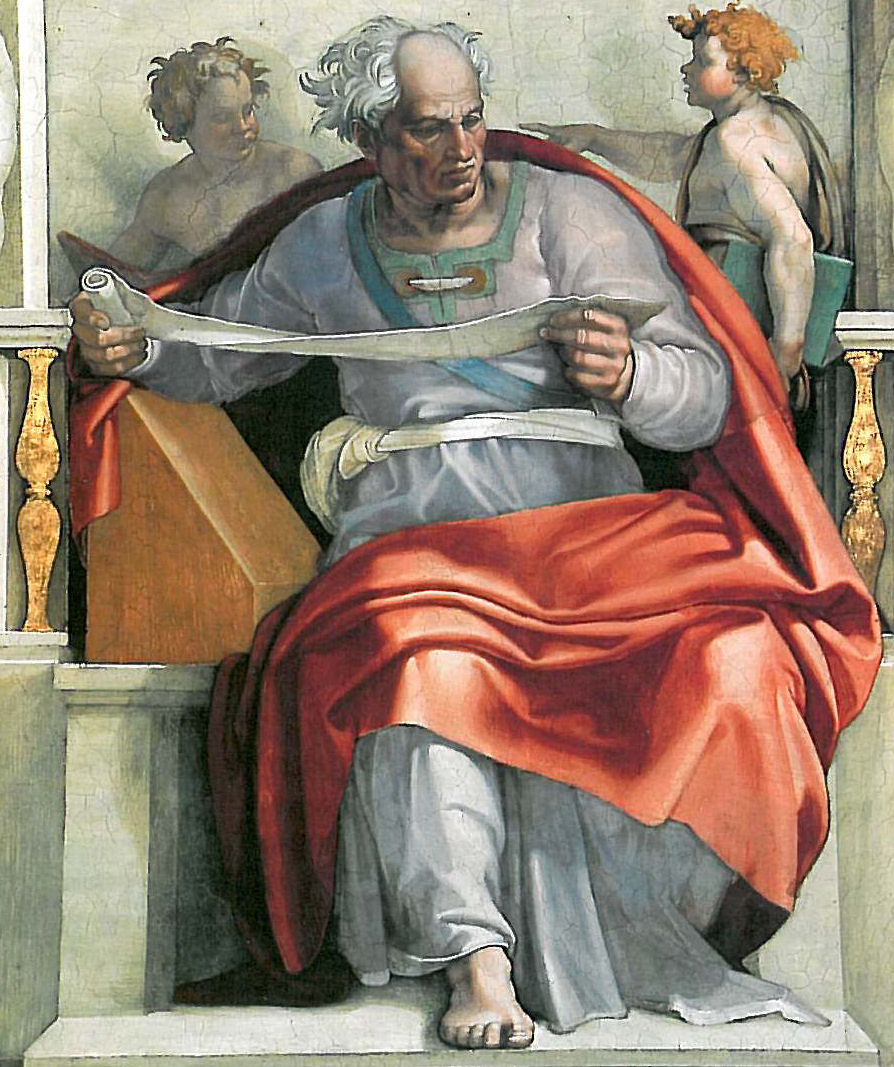
- Michelangelo's painting of the Biblical prophet
- Pronunciation: /ˈdʒoʊəl/ JOH-əl, /ˈdʒoʊl/ JOHL
- Gender: Male

Origin
- Origin: Hebrew
- Meaning: "YHWH is God"

Other names
- Related names: Joe, Joey, Joelle, Joelson

Joel or Yoel is a male name derived from יוֹאֵל Standard Hebrew, Yoʾel, Tiberian Hebrew, or Yôʾēl, meaning "Yahu is El" (El being a Northwest Semitic word meaning 'god' or 'deity'), "YHWH is God", or the modern translation "Yahweh is God".

A pious Jew would never use the word "Yahweh". In that context the name is said to mean "Adonai" or "the Lord is God".

It is reminiscent of the Shema, the Shema Yisrael (Hebrew: שְׁמַע יִשְׂרָאֵל, lit. 'Hear, Israel'), which is a Jewish prayer that serves as a centerpiece of the morning and evening Jewish prayer services. Its first verse, Deuteronomy 6:4, encapsulates the monotheistic essence of Judaism: "Hear, O Israel: YHWH our God, YHWH is one" (שְׁמַע יִשְׂרָאֵל יְהוָה אֱלֹהֵינוּ יְהוָה אֶחָֽד׃).

Joel as a given name appears in the Hebrew Bible and is also used today. Its female form is Joelle.

== Joel as a given name ==
=== Biblical figures ===
- Joel, Jewish Biblical prophet
- Joel (biblical figure), several minor figures in the Hebrew Bible

=== Others ===
- Joël (musician) (Joël Lobban, born 1996 or 1997), Canadian singer
- Joel of Dotawo, Sudanese ruler
- Joel Achenbach (born in 1960), American staff writer for The Washington Post and author
- Joel Acosta (born 1991), Argentine footballer
- Joel Amoroso (born 1998, Argentine footballer
- Joel Anderson (born 1960), California politician
- Joël Ayayi (born 2000), French basketball player
- Joel John Bailey (born 1980), Canadian soccer player
- Joel Conrad Bakan (born 1959), Canadian lawyer and writer
- Yoel Chehanovich (born 1993), Israeli footballer
- Joel Barbosa (born 1983), Argentine footballer
- Joel Barlow (1754–1812), American poet and politician
- Joel Barnett (1923–2014), British politician
- Joel Barr (1916–1998) American spy for the Soviet Union
- Joël Batteux (1943–2021), French politician
- Joel Beckett (born 1973), English actor
- Joel Beinin (born 1948), American historian of the Middle East
- Joel Benjamin (born 1964), American chess grandmaster
- Joel Berghult (born 1988), Swedish musician and YouTuber
- Joel Bomgar (born 1980), American businessman and politician
- Joel Bouagnon (born 1995), American football player
- Joël Bouchard (born 1974), Canadian ice hockey player
- Joel Bowden (born 1978), Australian rules footballer
- Joel Brand (1906–1964), Hungarian who had a prominent role in trying to save the Hungarian Jewish community
- Joel Breton, American game producer, DJ and entrepreneur
- Joel Brind, American scientist and anti-abortion activist
- Joel Brooks (born 1949), American actor
- Joel Brutus (born 1974), Haitian judoka
- Joel Carli (born 1986), Argentine retired footballer
- Joel Carpenter (1914–1965), American screenwriter
- Joel Carreño (born 1987), Dominican baseball player
- Joel Casamayor (born 1981), Cuban boxer
- Joel Chan (actor) (born 1976), Hong Kong actor and singer
- Joel Clinton (born 1981), Australian rugby footballer
- Joel Coen (born 1954), American director and producer
- Joel Connable (1973–2012), American news reporter, paramedic, and private pilot
- Joel Courtney (born 1996), American actor
- Joel Crawford (director), American story artist and film director
- Joel Crawford (politician) (1783–1858), American politician, soldier and lawyer
- Joel Crothers (1941–1985), American actor
- Joel Cummins (born 1975), American musician
- Joel DeLisa, American physiatrist
- Joel Desilets, American politician
- Joel Dommett (born 1985), British comedian, actor and presenter
- Joel Dorn (1942–2007), American music producer and record label entrepreneur
- Joel Dublanko (born 1998), American football player
- Joel Edgerton (born 1974), Australian actor
- Joel Ekelöf, Swedish vocalist of the band Soen
- Joel Elber, American politician
- Joel Embiid (born 1994), Cameroonian basketball player
- Joel Engle (born 1968), American recording artist
- Joel Erhardt (1838–1909), Commissioner of Police of New York City
- Joel Eriksson (born 1998), Swedish racing driver
- Joel Esteban (born 2005), Spanish motorcycle racer
- Joel Everson (born 1990), New Zealand rugby union footballer
- Joel Fabiani (born 1936), American actor
- Joel Feinberg (1926–2004), American political and social philosopher
- Joel Fitzgibbon (born 1962), Australian politician
- Joel Freeland (born 1987), British basketball player
- Joël Fuchs (born 1989), Swiss basketball player
- Joel Fuhrman (born 1953), American physician and author
- Joel Garner (born 1952), West Indian cricketer
- Joel Garreau (born 1948), American journalist and author
- Joel Geist (born 1982), American actor
- Joel Gerber (1940–2022) Chief Judge of the United States Tax Court
- Joel Gertner (born 1975), American wrestling personality
- Joel Gion (born 1970 or 1971), American musician
- Joel Gistedt (born 1987), Swedish ice hockey player
- Joel Glazer (born 1967), part of the Glazer family
- Joel Glucksman (born 1949), American Olympic fencer
- Joel Godard (born 1938), American television announcer
- Joel Goldsmith (1957–2012), American composer of film, television music and video games
- Joel S. Goldsmith (1892–1964), American author, teacher, spiritual healer, mystic and founder of the Infinite Way movement
- Joel Gordon, Canadian actor and filmmaker
- Joel Gordon (American football), American football coach and former player
- Joel Greenberg (historian) (born 1946), English educational technology consultant and historian
- Joel Greenberg (politician) (born 1984), American politician and former Florida tax collector
- Joel Greenblatt (born 1957), American academic, hedge fund manager, investor, and writer
- Joel Gretsch (born 1963), American actor
- Joel Grey (born 1932), American actor
- Joel Habener (1937–2025), American endocrinologist and academic
- Joel Hailey (born 1969), American musician
- Joel Hanrahan (born 1981), American baseball player
- Joel Chandler Harris (1848–1908), American journalist
- Joel Hass, American mathematician and academic
- Joel Heath (born 1993), American football player
- Joel Hefley (born 1935), American politician
- Joel Heyman (born 1971), American voice actor
- Joel Higgins (born 1943), American actor and singer
- Joel Henry Hildebrand (1881–1983) American educator and a pioneer chemist
- Joel Hirschhorn (1937–2005), American songwriter
- Joel Hodgson (born 1960), American creator of Mystery Science Theater 3000 and Joel Robinson, the character he plays on the show
- Joel Hoekstra (born 1970), American guitarist
- Joel Holmes (1821–1872), British soldier, recipient of the Victoria Cross
- Joel Horlen (1937–2022), American All-Star baseball player
- Joel Houston (born 1979), Australian musician and songwriter, worship leader at the Hillsong Church
- Joel Hurt (1850–1926), American businessman and developer
- Joel Hurtado (born 2001), Dominican baseball player
- Joel Hyatt (born 1950), American businessman, attorney and politician
- Joel Isasi (born 1967), Cuban sprinter
- Joel Iyiegbuniwe (born 1995), American football player
- Joël Jeannot (born 1965), French Olympic wheelchair racer
- Joel Jones (born 1981), Puerto Rican basketball player
- Yoel Juárez (born 2002), Argentine footballer
- Joel Kaplan (born 1969), American political advisor
- Joel Kauffman (born 1985), American stock car racer
- Joel Kinnaman (born 1979), Swedish-American actor
- Joel Klein (born 1946), Chancellor of the New York City Department of Education
- Joel Kovel (1936–2018), American politician, academic, writer and eco-socialist
- Joel Kramer (born 1955), American basketball player
- Joel Kodua (born 1997), Ghanaian-born English professional boxer
- Joel Kwiatkowski (born 1977), Canadian ice hockey player
- Joel Landau, American entrepreneur, founder of The Allure Group
- Joel Landau (rabbi), American rabbi
- Joel Lane (1963–2013), British author, poet, critic and anthology editor
- Joel Lanning (born 1994), American football player
- Joël Le Tac (1918–2005), member of the Free French Forces (FFF) during the Second World War
- Joël Le Theule (1930–1980), French politician
- Joel Lebowitz (born 1930), American mathematical physicist
- Joel Lehtonen, Finnish author
- Joel Lehtonen (footballer) (born 1999), Finnish footballer
- Yoel Levi (born 1950), Israeli conductor
- Joel Levin, American psychologist
- Joel S. Levine (born 1942), American planetary and atmospheric scientist
- Joel López Pissano (born 1997), Argentine footballer
- Joel Löwe (1760–1802), German Biblical commentator
- Joel Luani (born 1992), Australian rugby player
- Joel Lundqvist (born 1982), Swedish ice hockey player
- Joel Lynch (born 1987), British football player
- Joel Mace, American politician
- Joel Madden (born 1979), American musician, lead vocalist for Good Charlotte
- Joel Dawit Makonnen (born 1982), Ethiopian prince
- Joel Antônio Martins (1931–2003), Brazilian footballer known as "Joel"
- Joël Matip (born 1991), Cameroonian footballer
- Joel McCormack, American computer scientist
- Joel McCrea (1905–1990), American actor
- Joel McHale (born 1971), American actor and host
- Joel McIlroy (born 1973), Australian actor
- Joel McIver (born 1971), British author
- Joel McNeely (born 1959), American music composer for movies and television
- Joel Melasniemi (born 1975), Finnish musician
- Joël Mergui (born 1958), French Jewish official
- Joel Meyerowitz (born 1938), American photographer
- Joel Meyers, American sportscaster
- Joel Miller (racing driver) (born 1988), American auto racing driver
- Joel David Moore (born 1977), American actor
- Joel Moses (1941–2022), Israel-born American computer scientist
- Joel Müller (1897–1895) German rabbi
- Joel Muñoz (born 1980), Panamanian basketball player
- Joel Murray (born 1963), American actor
- Joel Murray (basketball) (born 1999), American basketball player
- Joel Mvuka (born 2002), Norwegian footballer
- Joel Myers (born 1939), American businessman, founder, president and chairman of the board of AccuWeather, Inc.
- Joel Mäntynen, Finnish basketball player
- Joël Gustave Nana Ngongang (1982–2015), Cameroonian activist for LGBT human rights & HIV/AIDS in Africa
- Joel Oppenheimer (1930–1988) American poet
- Joel Osteen (1983), American author, pastor, and televangelist
- Joel Otto (1961), American ice hockey player
- Joel Palmer (1810–1881), American pioneer, author and politician
- Joel Parker (American football) (b. 1952), American football player
- Joel Parker (clergyman) (1799–1873), American Presbyterian clergyman
- Joel Parker (jurist) (1795–1875), American jurist from New Hampshire
- Joel Parker (politician) (1816–1888), American politician for the Democratic Party
- Joel Peralta (born 1976), Dominican baseball player
- Joel Perovuo (born 1985), Finnish football player
- Joel Pimentel de León (born 1999), American singer
- Joel Piñeiro (born 1978), American baseball player
- Joel Plaskett (born 1975), Canadian rock musician
- Joel Pohjanpalo (born 1995), Finnish football player
- Joel Roberts Poinsett (1779–1851), American physician, botanist and diplomat
- Joel Porter (born 1978), Australian football player
- Joël Prévost (1950–2024), French singer
- Joel Primack (1945–2025), American professor of Astronomy and Astrophysics
- Joel Przybilla (born 1979), American basketball player
- Joel Randall (born 1999), English footballer
- Joel Robles (born 1990), Spanish football player
- Yoel Rodríguez (born 1988), Spanish footballer
- Joel Quarrington (born 1955), Canadian bass player and soloist
- Joel Quenneville (born 1958), Canadian former ice hockey defenceman, and coach of the NHL's Florida Panthers
- Joel Reddy (born 1985), Australian Rugby League player
- Joel Rifkin (born 1959), American serial killer
- Joel Augustus Rogers (1880–1966), Jamaican-American author, journalist and historian
- Yoel Romero (born 1977), Cuban wrestler and mixed martial arts fighter
- Joel Rosenberg (1954–2011), Canadian-American science fiction and fantasy author
- Joel C. Rosenberg (born 1967), American author and communications strategist
- Joel Ross, American tennis player
- Joel Ross (vibraphonist), American jazz vibraphonist
- Joel Roth, American rabbi in the Rabbinical Assembly
- Joel Sacks (born 1989), Argentine footballer
- Joel Salatin (born 1975), American farmer, lecturer, and author
- Yoel Moshe Salomon (1838–1912), Ottoman newspaper publisher and co-founder of towns
- Joel Sampson, Tobago politician
- Joel Santana (born 1948), Brazilian manager and former football player
- Joel Schumacher (1939–2020) American director and producer
- Joel Sclavi (born 1994), Argentine rugby union player
- Joel Selwood (born 1988), Australian Rules footballer
- Joel Shapiro (1941–2025), American sculptor
- Joel Shatzky (1943–2020), American writer and literary professor
- Joel Shepherd (born 1974), Australian science fiction author
- Joel Sherman (born 1962), American Scrabble expert
- Joel ibn Shu'aib, 15th-century rabbi from Aragon
- Joel Siegel (1943–2007), American film critic
- Joel Silbersher (born 1971), musician from Australia
- Joel Silver (born 1952), American film producer
- Joel Sirkis (1561–1640), Central European rabbi
- Joel Skinner (born 1961), American baseball player and coach
- Joel Sonnenberg (born 1977), Christian motivational speaker
- Joel Soriano (born 2000), American basketball player
- Joel Elias Spingarn (1875–1939), American civil rights activist
- Yoel Sela (born 1951), Israeli Olympic competitive sailor
- Joel Spitzer (born 1957), American smoking cessation educator
- Joel Spolsky (born 1965), American software engineer
- Joel Stallworth (born 1984), American sprinter
- Joel Stebbins (1878–1966), American astronomer who pioneered photoelectric photometry in astronomy
- Joel Stein (born 1971), American journalist
- Joel Steinberg (born 1941), New York criminal defense attorney
- Joel Stelly (born 1984), American football player for the Chicago, IL Bears
- Joel Sternfeld (born 1944), American photographer
- Joel Stransky (born 1967), South African rugby union footballer
- Joel Stroetzel (born 1980), American guitarist from the Massachusetts metalcore band Killswitch Engage
- Joel Sturm (born 2001), German racing driver
- Joel Surnow (born 1955), American writer and producer
- Joel Sweeney (1810–1860), American musician who popularized the banjo
- Joel Teitelbaum (1887–1979), Hungarian Hasidic Rabbi and Talmudic scholar
- Joel Thompson (politician) (1760–1843), United States Representative from New York
- Joel Thompson (rugby league) (born 1988), Australian rugby league footballer
- Joel Tobeck (born 1971), New Zealand film and television actor
- Joel Tudor (born 1976), professional surfer from San Diego, California
- Joel Turner (musician) (born 1987), Australian musician
- Joel Veitch (born 1974), English web animator and member of the B3ta collective
- Joel Vital (born 1987), Portuguese footballer known as Joel
- Joël Veltman (born 1992), Dutch footballer
- Joël Voordewind (born 1965), Dutch politician
- Joel Ward (footballer) (born 1989), English footballer
- Joel Ward (ice hockey) (born 1980), ice hockey player
- Joel Ward (magician) (born 1983), magician
- Joel N. Ward (born 1959), foreign currency trader
- Joel Waterman (born 1996), Canadian soccer player
- Joel Webbon, American Christian nationalist
- Joel Wiener (born 1948/49), American billionaire real estate developer and landlord
- Joel Wilson (American football) (born 2000), American football player
- Joel Wilson (rugby) (born 1977), Australian rugby player
- Joel Wilson (umpire) (born 1966), Trinidadian cricket umpire
- Joel Winters, American politician
- Joel Yanofsky (1955–2020), Canadian novelist and literary columnist
- Joel Youngblood (born 1951), American Major League baseball player
- Joel Zifkin (born 1954), Canadian musician and songwriter from Montreal, QC
- Joel Zimmerman (born 1981), Canadian progressive house and electro house DJ better known as deadmau5
- Joel Zumaya (born 1984), American Major League Baseball relief pitcher
- Joel Zwick (born 1942), American director of movies, theatre, and television shows

== Fictional characters ==
- Joel Barish, protagonist of the film Eternal Sunshine of the Spotless Mind, portrayed by Jim Carrey
- Joel Fleischman M.D., central character of the TV series Northern Exposure
- Joel Goodson, protagonist of the film Risky Business, portrayed by Tom Cruise
- Joel Hammond, a main character in Netflix series Santa Clarita Diet
- Joel Miller, protagonist of The Last of Us video game
- Joel Miller, kid who drinks from the firehose in UHF (film)
- Joel Robinson, in the television series Mystery Science Theater 3000
