= Moses de León =

Spanish rabbi and Kabbalist (c. 1240 – 1305)

- משה בן שם-טוב די־ליאון
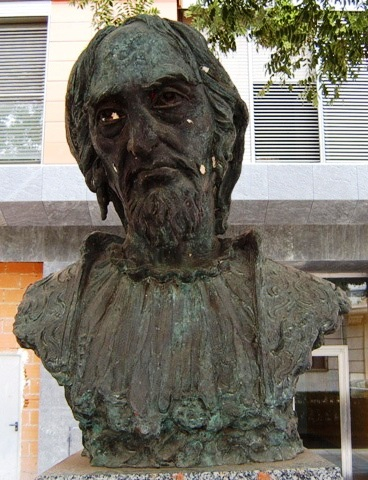
- Statue of Moses in Guadalajara, Spain (Luis Sanguino)

Personal life
- Born: c. 1240 León, Kingdom of León
- Died: 1305 Arévalo, Kingdom of Castile
- Known for: Kabbalah

Religious life
- Religion: Judaism

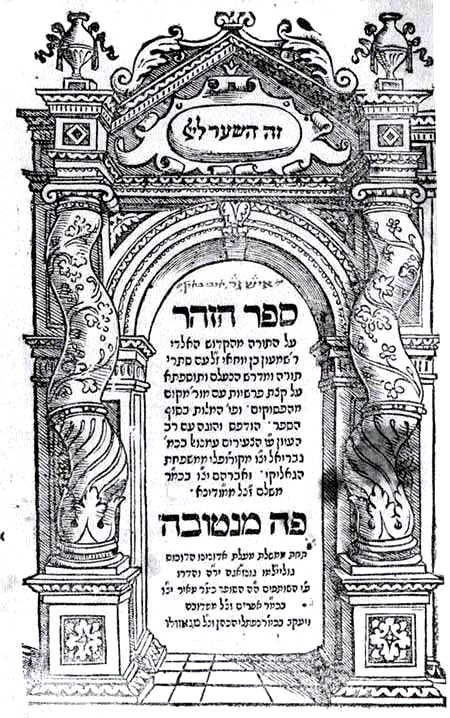
Title page of first edition of the Zohar, Mantua, 1558. Library of Congress.

Moses de León (c. 1240 – 1305), known in Hebrew as Moshe ben Shem-Tov (משה בן שם־טוב די־ליאון), was a Spanish rabbi and Kabbalist who first publicized the Zohar. Modern scholars believe the Zohar is his own work, despite his claim to have copied it out of an ancient manuscript by Shimon ben Yochai. His other works include Sefer ha-Rimon, written in Hebrew, and hundreds of pseudepigraphic responsa, commentaries, and Kabbalistic tracts which he falsely attributed to earlier authorities.

== Life ==
Moses de León was born in León, Kingdom of León in modern-day Spain, then united with the Crown of Castile. He might have been born in Guadalajara and his surname, then, comes from his father, Shem-Tov de León. He spent 30 years in Guadalajara and Valladolid before moving to Ávila, where he spent the rest of his life. Moses de León died at Arévalo in 1305 while returning to his home.

== Pardes ==
Moses de León was the first to advance the Kabbalistic theory of Biblical exegesis, as a Jewish adaptation of the fourfold method of Biblical exegesis from medieval Christianity.

The term, sometimes also rendered PaRDeS, means "orchard" when taken literally, but is used in this context as a Hebrew acronym formed from the initials of the following four approaches:

- Peshat (פְּשָׁט) – "surface" ("straight") or the literal (direct) meaning.
- Remez (רֶמֶז) – "hints" or the deep (allegoric: hidden or symbolic) meaning beyond just the literal sense. In the version of the New Zohar, Re'iah.
- Derash (דְּרַשׁ) – from Hebrew darash: "inquire" ("seek") – the comparative (midrashic) meaning, as given through similar occurrences.
- Sod (סוֹד) – "secret" ("mystery") or the esoteric/mystical meaning, as given through inspiration or revelation.

== Resources ==
- Kohler, Kaufmann et al., "Leon, Moses (Ben Shem-Tob) de." Jewish Encyclopedia. Funk and Wagnalls, 1901–1906, citing:

- Ahimaaz Chronicle, ed. London, pp. 95 et seq.;
- Adolf Jellinek, Moses b. Schem-Tob de Leon und Seine Verhältniss zum Sohar, Leipsic, 1851;
- Grätz, Gesch. vii. 231 et seq.;
- Abraham Geiger, Das Judenthum und Seine Geschichte, iii. 75 et seq., Breslau, 1871;
- Giovanni Bernardo De Rossi and C. H. Hamberger, Hist. Wörterb. p. 177;
- Moritz Steinschneider, Cat. Bodl. cols. 1852 et seq.;
- idem, Hebr. Bibl. x. 156 et seq.
- Avishai Bar Asher, R. Moses de León - Sefer Mishkan ha-Edut, Los Angeles: Cherub Press, 2013
