= Joel =

Joel may refer to:

== People ==
- Joel (given name), including a list of people named Joel or Yoel
- Joel (surname), a surname
- Joel (footballer, born 1904), Brazilian football goalkeeper Joel de Oliveira Monteiro (1904–1990)
- Joel (footballer, born 1980), Brazilian football centre-back Joel Bertoti Padilha

== Places ==
- Joel, Georgia, a community in the United States
- Joel, Wisconsin, a community in the United States

== Other uses ==
- Book of Joel, a book in the Jewish Tanakh, and in the Christian Bible, ascribed to the prophet
  - Joel (prophet), a prophet of ancient Israel
