= Yoale =

Yoale may refer to:

- Yoal, a type of boat
- Yoel (or יוֹאֵל), a Hebrew equivalent of the name Joel
