= Gebel Adda =

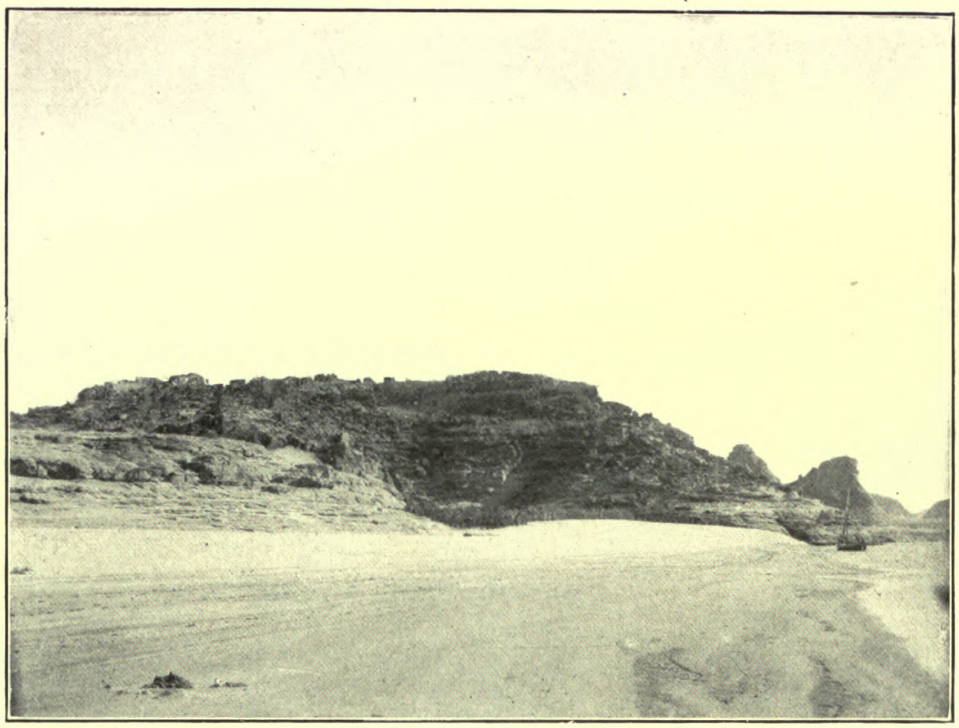
- View of Gebel Adda in 1910

Highest point
- Coordinates: 22°17′50″N 31°38′13″E

Geography
- Location within Egypt
- Location: Egypt

Gebel or Jebel Adda was a mountain and archaeological site on the right bank of the Nubian Nile in what is now southern Egypt. The settlement on its crest was continuously inhabited from the late Meroitic period (2nd century AD–4th century) to the Ottoman period, when it was abandoned by the late 18th century. It reached its greatest prominence in the 14th and 15th centuries, when it seemed to have been the capital of Nubian kingdom of Makuria under the names Dau and Atwa. Much of the site is now underwater, flooded by the construction of Lake Nasser.

Gebel Adda was superficially excavated in the 1960s by the American Research Center in Egypt, just before it was submerged. Archaeologists unearthed several churches, some with their paintings still intact, two palatial structures, inscriptions in the Meroitic language, documents in Old Nubian, and a large amount of leatherwork at the site. The nearby ancient Egyptian rock temple of Horemheb was relocated. Much of the material excavated from Gebel Adda is stored in the Royal Ontario Museum in Canada and remains unpublished.

== Location ==
Rising from its flat surroundings as a table mountain with steep slopes on all sides, Gebel Adda lay in Lower Nubia, on the east bank of the Nile, between the first and second cataracts, five kilometers south-east of Abu Simbel. The current border with Sudan lies 20 kilometers to the south. In the vicinity there were once several smaller settlements from Christian times: the Church of Kaw lay about 20 kilometers downstream on the same side of the river bank, while Abdallah Nirqi and Tamit were directly opposite, and the burial grounds of Qustul lay about ten kilometres to the south. All these sites were flooded in the late 1960s and early 1970s.

The Egyptian temple on the slopes of the mountain is often named after the modern-day village Abu Oda that was located at the foot of the mountain. The mountain fortress is thought to have been the capital of Makuria from 1365 to around 1500, known as Dau or Daw (Arabic: دو) or Atwa (Old Nubian: ⲁⲧⲟⲩⲁ, Atoua).

== History ==
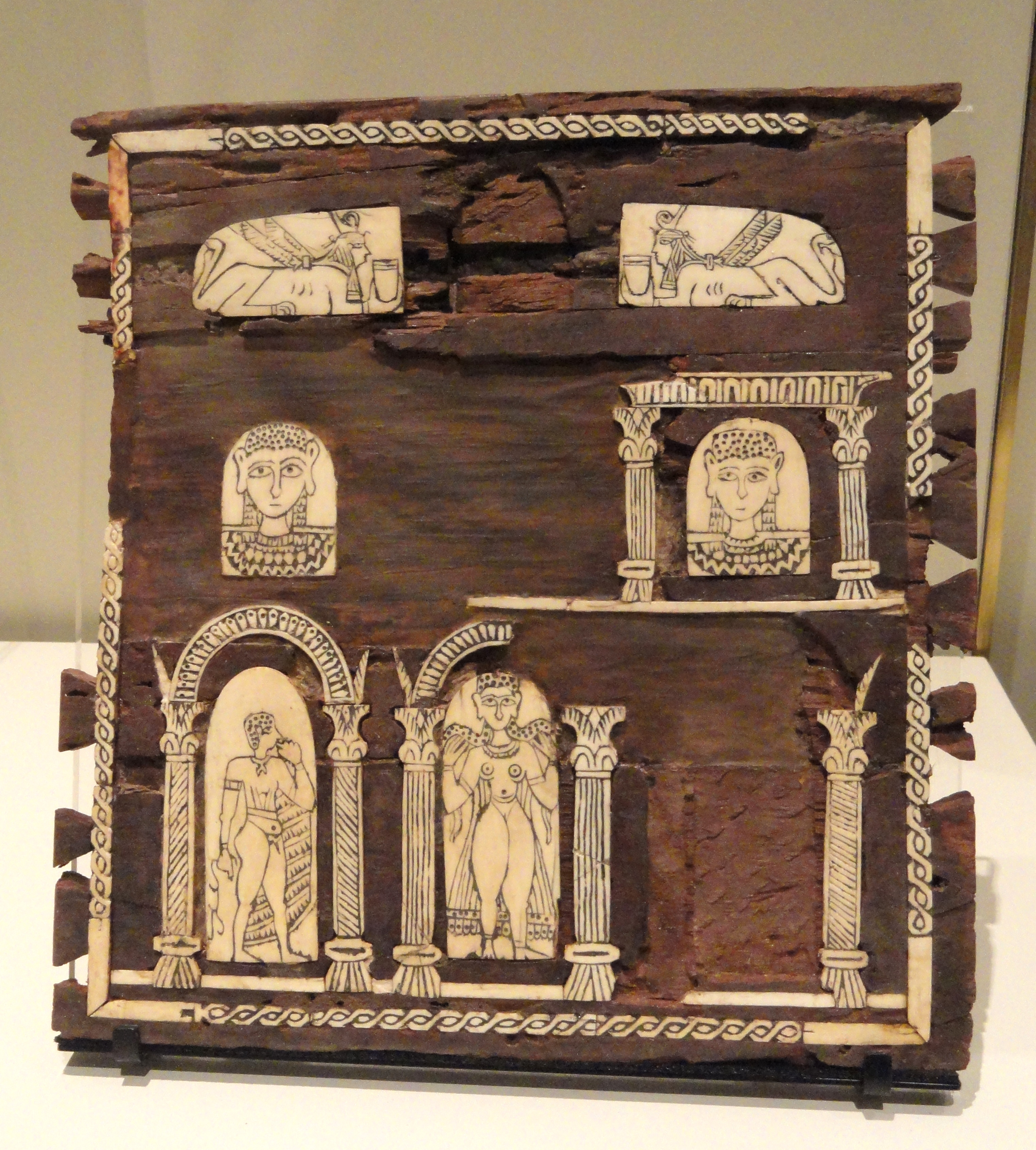
A box from Gebel Adda with decorated ivory inlay (4th century CE), Royal Ontario Museum

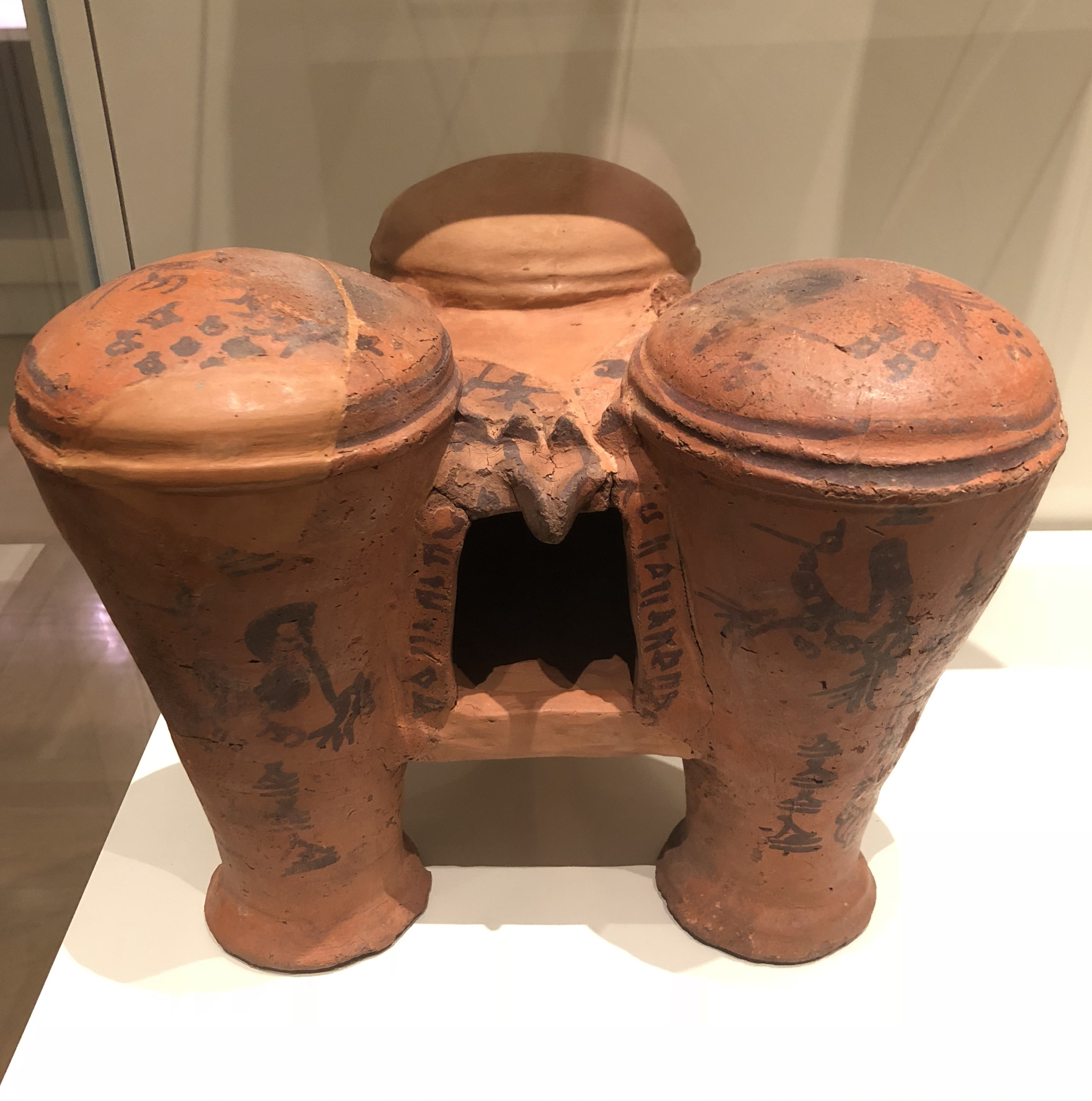
Late Christian pottery (12th–14th centuries), Royal Ontario Museum

At the beginning of the New Kingdom of Egypt in the sixteenth century BCE, Pharaohs conquered the Nubian part of the Nile in several campaigns against the Kingdom of Kerma and had temples built in several places, immortalising themselves in inscriptions down to the twelfth century. During the reign of Haremheb (c. 1319–1292), the rock temple was built at nearby Abu Oda.

While most of the excavated material remains unpublished it seems that the hilltop of Gebel Adda was settled at least since the late Meroitic period, probably from the 2nd century AD. The settlement was surrounded by a defensive wall, the simple construction of which was modified and expanded several times up until the Christian period. After Egypt became a Roman province, Gebel Adda was ruled by an Egyptian governor as part of Triakontaschoinos. From the middle of the third century CE the area came under attack from the south by the Blemmyes who controlled Lower Nubia in the following century. Between the second and fourth centuries, Gebel Adda was an important provincial center together with Faras. On the plain, a large cemetery has been preserved, belong the X-Group culture (about 350 to 550).

The spread of Christianity in later Roman Egypt and the construction of the first churches in the region began in the mid-sixth century. At this time, a Christian influence is correspondingly visible at Gebel Adda: amphorae found in an X-Group grave are decorated with Christian graffiti in the form of Greek crosses. This does not mean that the burial ground was Christian, but the find does indicate the spread of the Christian symbol. From the late Christian period to the sixteenth century, Faras, Qasr Ibrim and Gebel Adda were the largest fortified cities in Lower Nubia. A complex of buildings during this period may have been the palace of the Dotawo kings. Large parts of the town were rebuilt in the 13th century, in addition to the palace area, other larger buildings and a church were built. In the 14th century, the palace and the defenses were expanded again. The kingdom of Dotawo is mainly characterized by inscriptions known from Gebel Adda and Qasr Ibrim. In 1155 a bishop of Selim and a king of Dotawo are mentioned in a text by Qasr Ibrim. A letter from Gebel Adda dated 1484 mentions Joel of Dotawo as well as nobles and church leaders. From the 13th century the Mamluks raided the Nubian Christian kingdoms. Sultan Baibars I sent a force to overthrow the Makurian king David at Dongola in 1276 in response to previous Nubian raids . On the way there were battles at Gebel Adda and Meinarti, up to the decisive battle in Dongola, which was victorious for the Egyptians. From this time on, the Egyptian Muslims increasingly dominated the politics of the Nubian empires. The Makurian rulers in Lower Nubia also suffered from raids from nomadic tribes. With Egyptian support they succeeded in 1364 at Gebel Adda in a victory against the insurgents. Presumably the mountain fortress became their retreat from which they ruled the empire of Dotawo. In the 1560s, the Ottomans established a garrison in the fortress city of Qasr Ibrim and on the island of Saï. By this time, by conventional reckoning, the kingdom of Dotawo had already disappeared. Gebel Adda remained inhabited throughout the Turkish period until the later 18th century, when its population likely migrated to Ballana on the other bank of the Nile.

== History of research ==
View from Gebel Adda towards the south, 1964

Nineteenth-century European travelers described the prominent rocky hill and the ruins of the former city next to the village of Abahuda. Anton von Prokesch-Osten counted seventy small burial mounds made of stones and clay bricks in the sand hollows at the foot of the mountain, believed by the locals to be the tombs of Islamic martyrs (saints) who died in the conquest of the Christian settlement. Prokesch-Osten took the site to be Roman. He also visited the "Felsengrab von Abahuda" ("rock tomb of Abahuda") — the pharaonic temple later converted into a church — on the mountainside, devoting a paragraph to it in his travelogue. During his stay in 1906, Arthur Weigall also dated the graves with subterranean vaulted chambers to the Fatimid period (tenth–twelfth centuries CE).

In 1932–1933, Ugo Monneret de Villard carried out excavations in Lower Nubia on behalf of the Egyptian antiquities authority and with the support of the Italian Ministry of Foreign Affairs. He wrote the first detailed report about the fortress and the tombs. Monneret, who was mainly interested in the remains of the Middle Ages, uncovered three church buildings to the south of the fortress hill.

In 1959, Mustafa el-Amir began the first systematic excavations as leader of an expedition from the University of Alexandria. In a three-month campaign they uncovered a large part of the Christian cemetery (Cemetery 2), as well as six large burial mounds from the X-Group period (Cemetery 1), some late Christian-period dwellings on the hill, and the church already examined by Monneret (Church 1). The excavations led by Nicholas B. Millet on behalf of the American Research Center built on this. Their most extensive work was carried out in four campaigns from 1962 to 1965 between December and April.

== Layout ==
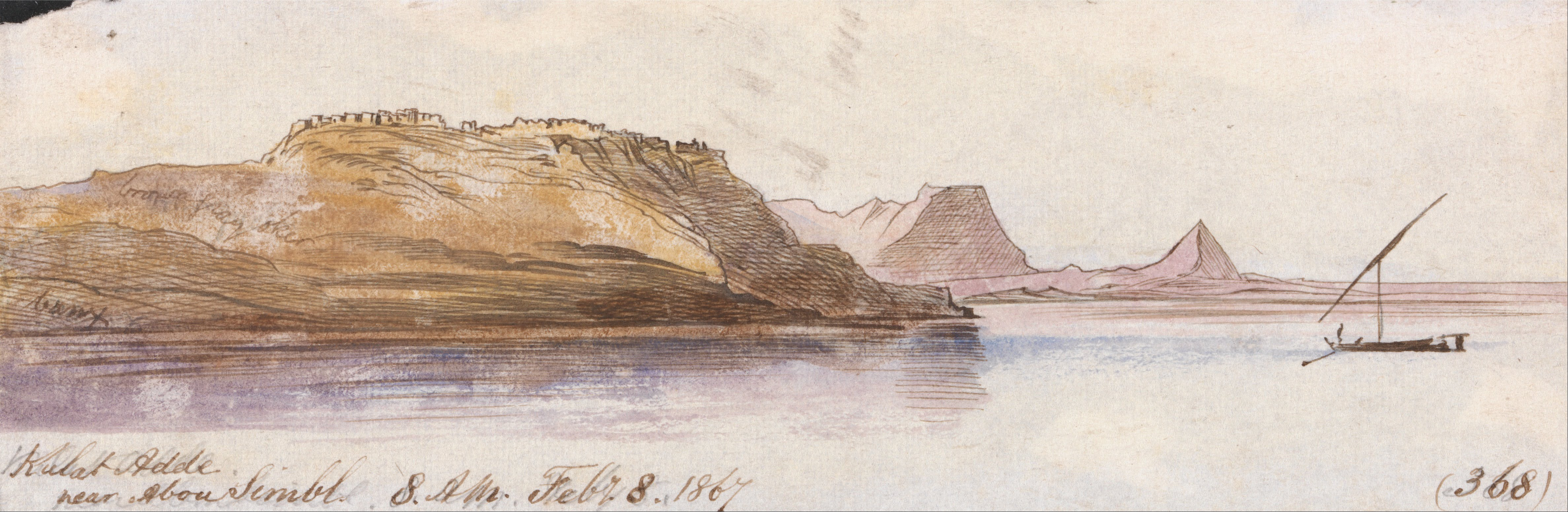
Sketch of Gebel Adda and its surroundings by Edward Lear, 1867

The ancient and medieval city lay on the crest of the steep hill, from which a slightly flatter spur pushes north to bank of the Nile. The only access was a steep and narrow path, partly involving stairs, which ascended to the spur and from there led first into the northern suburbs, and then on into the city proper through a massive gate that was reinforced in the fourteenth century. This route was protected by an adobe tower; in the Meroitic period, the city wall ran to the north of this, later to be found by archaeologists under Christian- and Islamic-period ruins. On the north-east side there was a rectangular platform made of stone, which probably formed the base (stylobate) of a temple. From here the enclosing wall ran across the north-eastern tip of the hill and some distance from the settlement along its east side. In at least some places the adobe wall was reinforced on the outside by an additional rubble wall.

As at Qasr Ibrim or Ikhmindi, the residential buildings were built close together and could only be reached via narrow, winding streets. The walls consisted predominantly of clay bricks, the roofs constructed as Nubian vaults.

One of the approximately seven churches in the area was preserved between the densely packed ruined houses, lying to the left of the stairway as the stairway reached the plateau. The hill reached its highest point in the southwest, where scattered fragments of granite columns identified around 1900 indicated the site of a larger church. Fragments of reddish sandstone capitals were found in the rubble, one decorated with large smooth leaves, along with a corbel decorated with volutes. Directly above the Meroitic northern defense tower stood another church, which in the Middle Ages collapsed along with the northern outer wall of the tower.

== The Temple of Horemhab ==
The small rock temple (speos) lay directly above the water level (at the then normal water level of the Nile of 120 metres above sea level). The entrance gate of the temple carved into the sandstone could be reached via thirteen steps. A small passageway opened into a central hall (anteroom) divided by four columns, with a cella at the back and two adjoining rooms off to the side. It was dedicated to the gods Amun-Re and Thoth of Hermopolis Magna. There are also representations of the goddess Anuket and the falcon-headed Horus. All four Nubian forms of Horus are shown. Reliefs show Haremheb sacrificing to the supreme gods of Aniba, Buhen, Quban (Egyptian Baki, today near ad-Dakka) and Abu Simbel (Egyptian Meha).

The early Christians converted the temple into a church, covering the walls with a layer of plaster to hide the reliefs of the Egyptian gods, and painting them with frescoes. Prokesch-Osten describes walls richly covered with Egyptian hieroglyphs and images alongside Christian motifs such as Saint George with a red horse above the baptismal font. During the construction of the Aswan Dam, parts of the chapel were cut out of the rock and rebuilt near the Temple of Abu Simbel.

Gallery

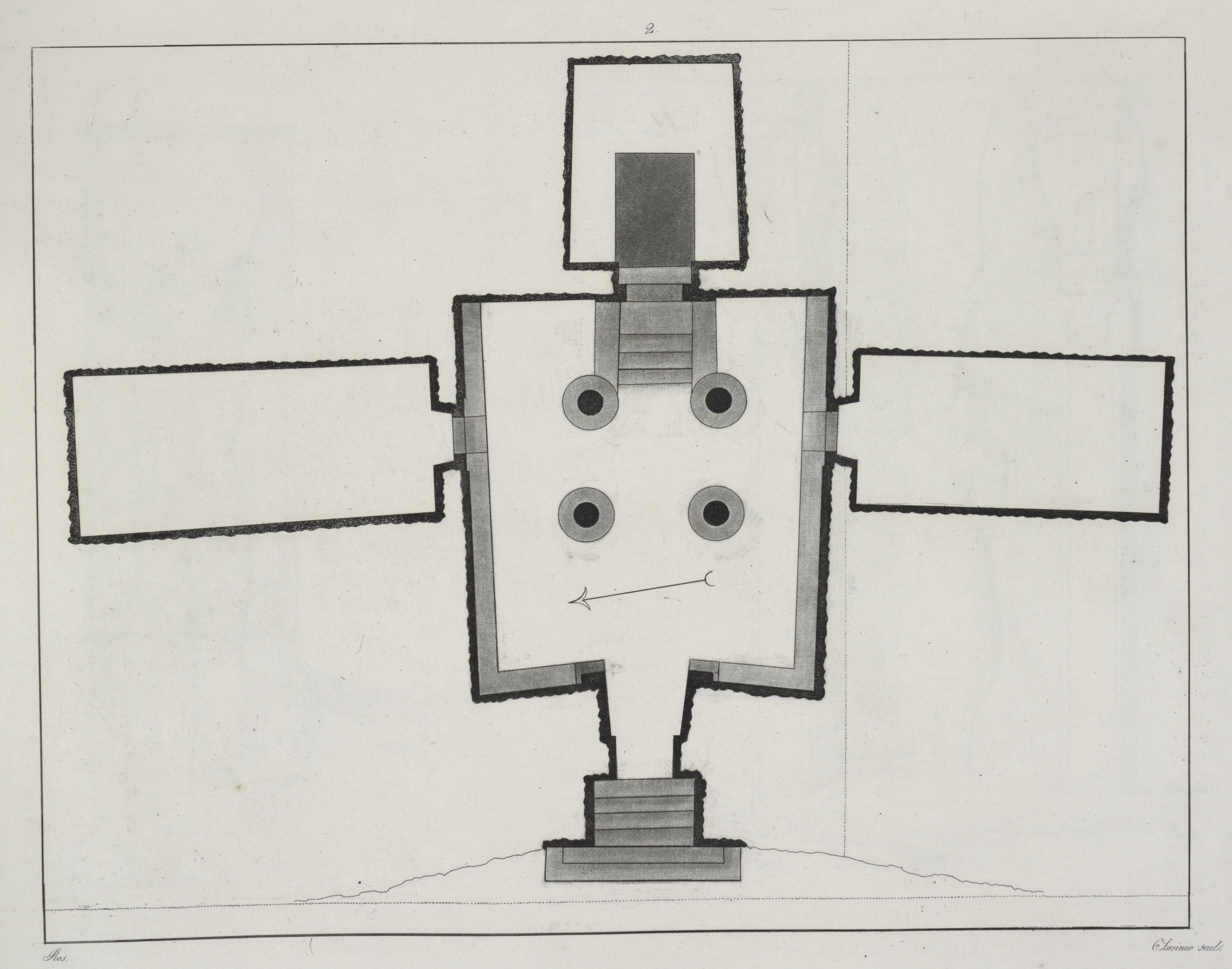
Ground plan of the temple after Ippolito Rosellini, 1832

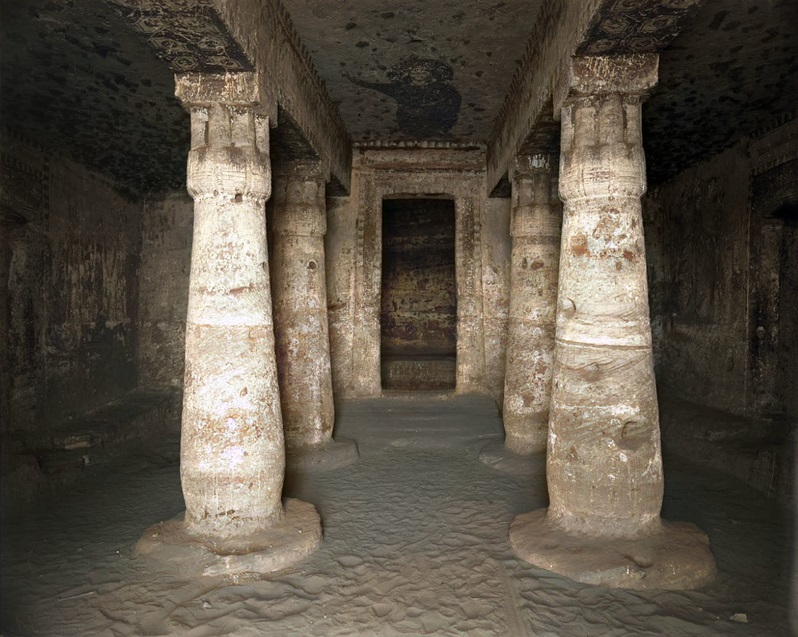
Interior of the temple in 1908. Note the medieval painting of Christ on the ceiling

== Gallery ==
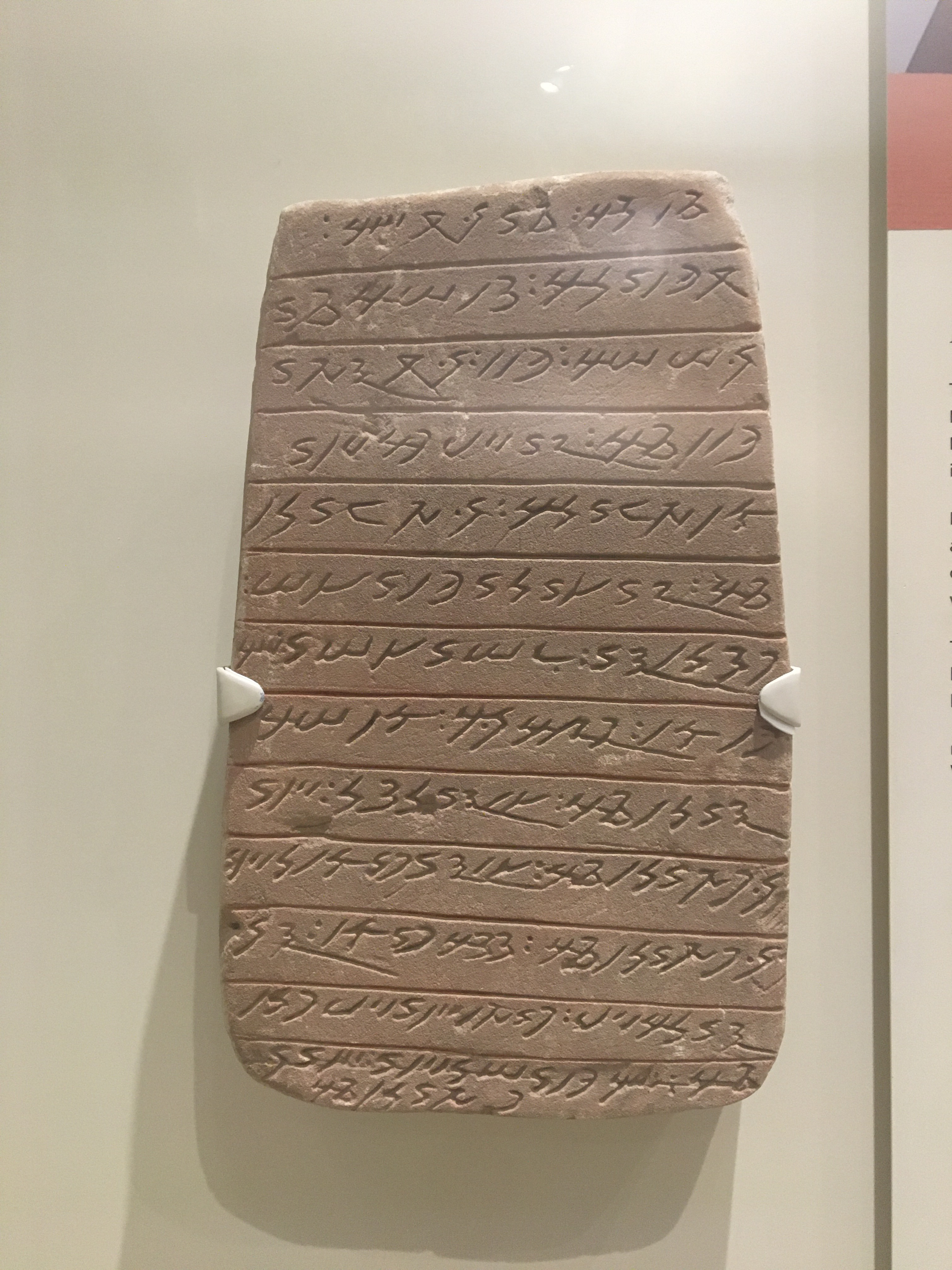
Inscribed Funerary Stela from Gebel Adda, Royal Ontario Museum

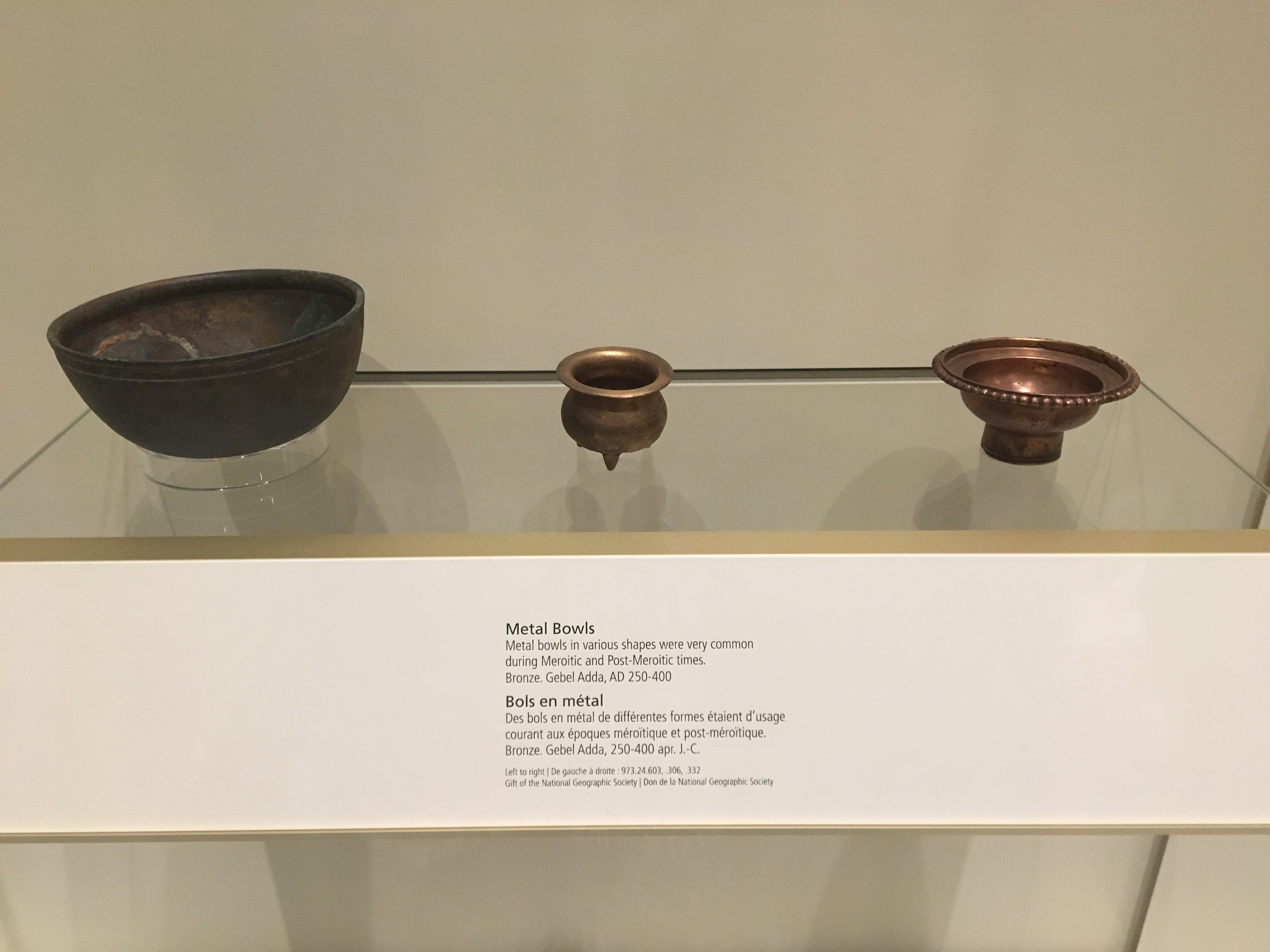
Metal bowls from Gebel Adda, Royal Ontario Museum

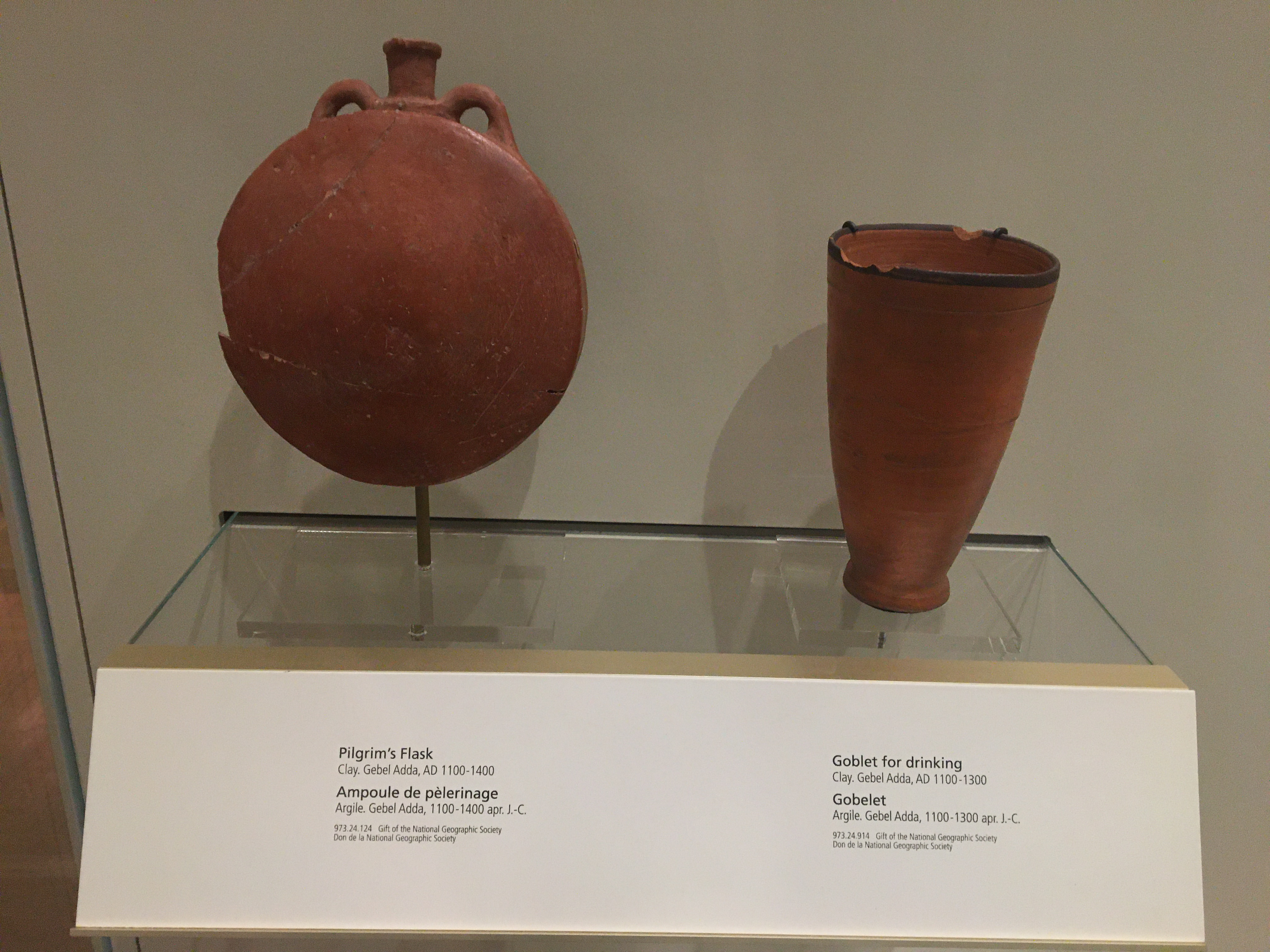
Flask and Goblet from Gebel Adda, Royal Ontario Museum

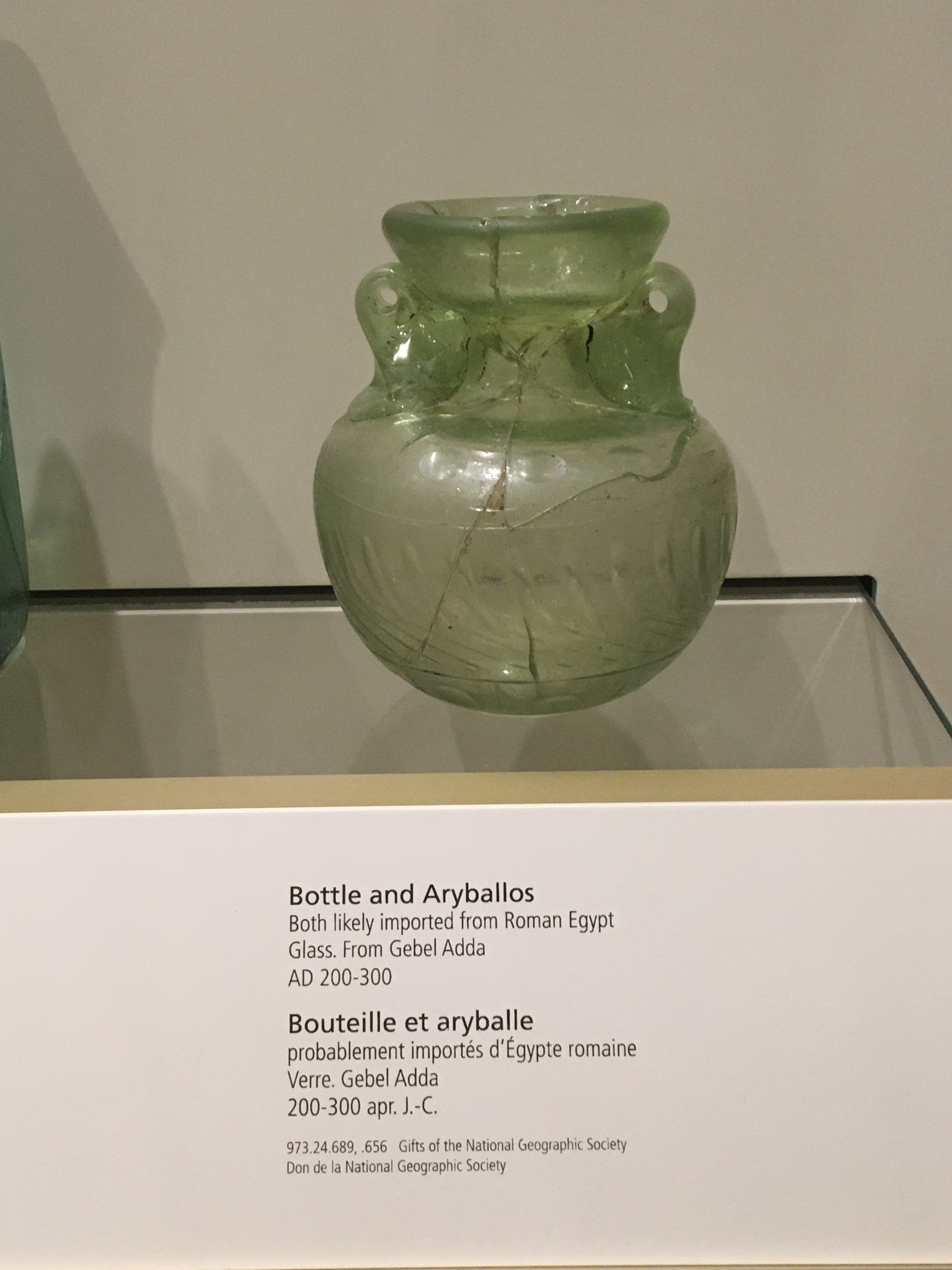
Aryballos imported from Roman Egypt, found in Gebel Adda. Royal Ontario Museum

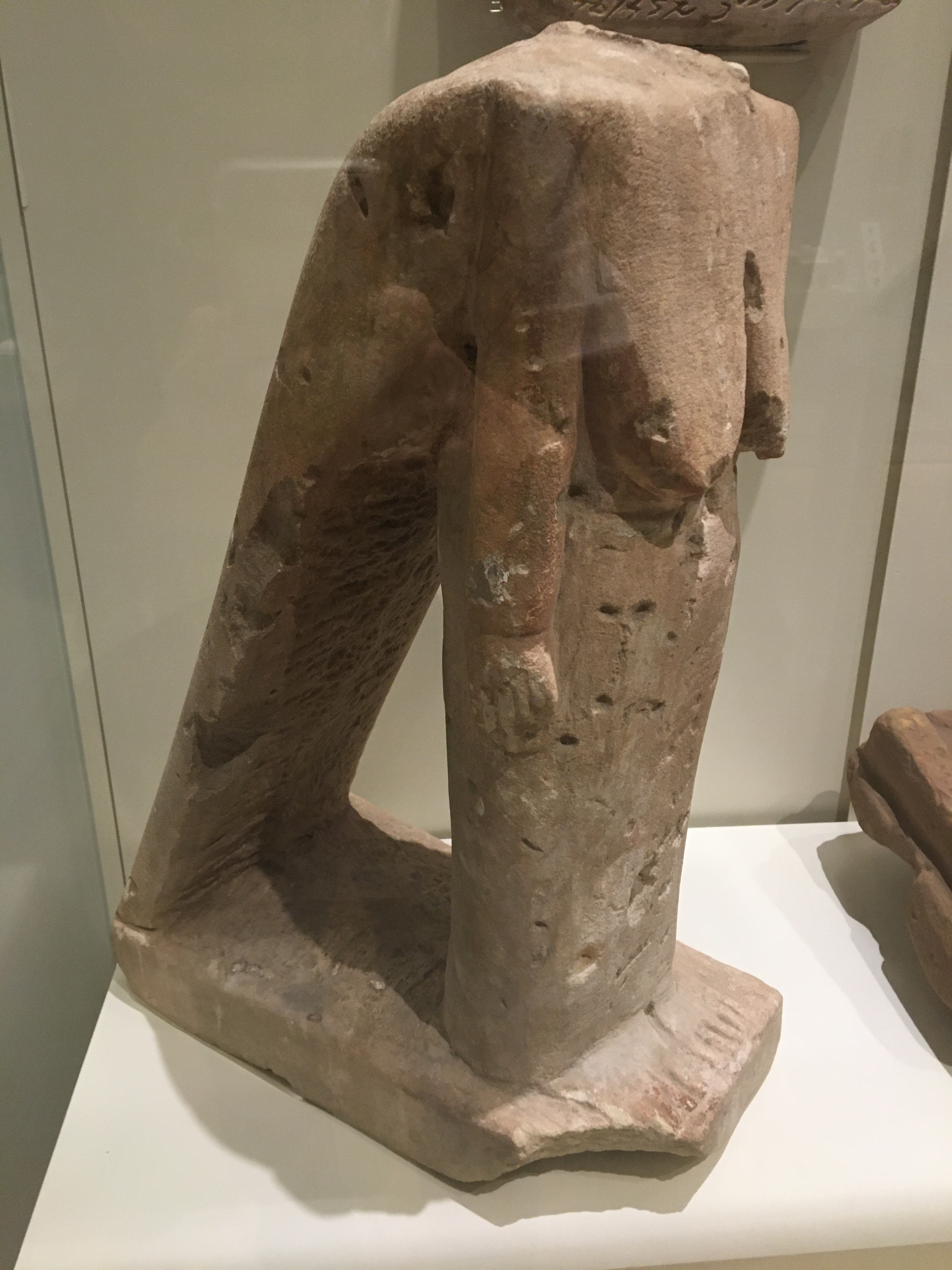
Ba-statue from Gebel Adda. Royal Ontario Museum

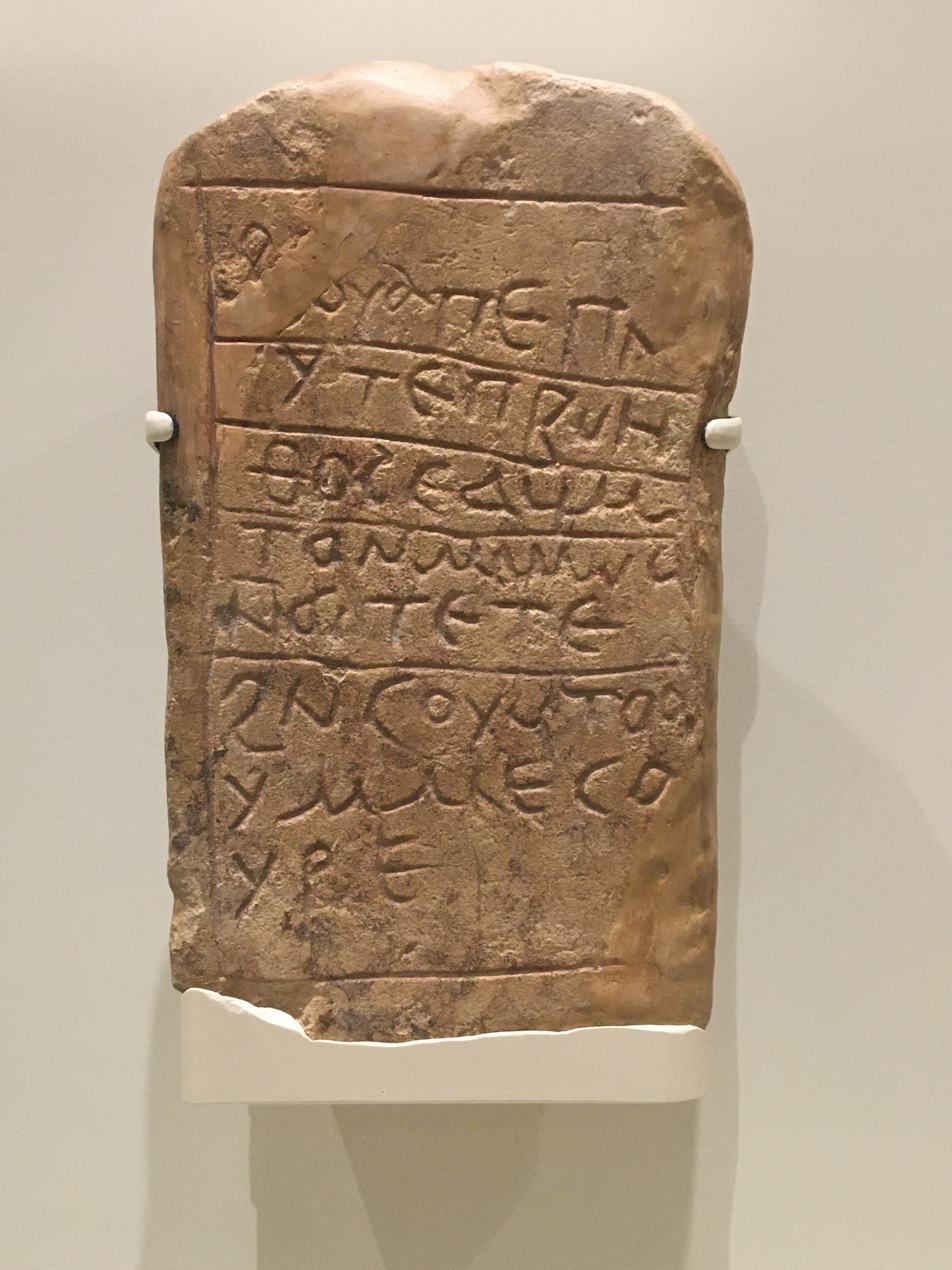
Stele from Gebel Adda with Greek magical text. Royal Ontario Museum

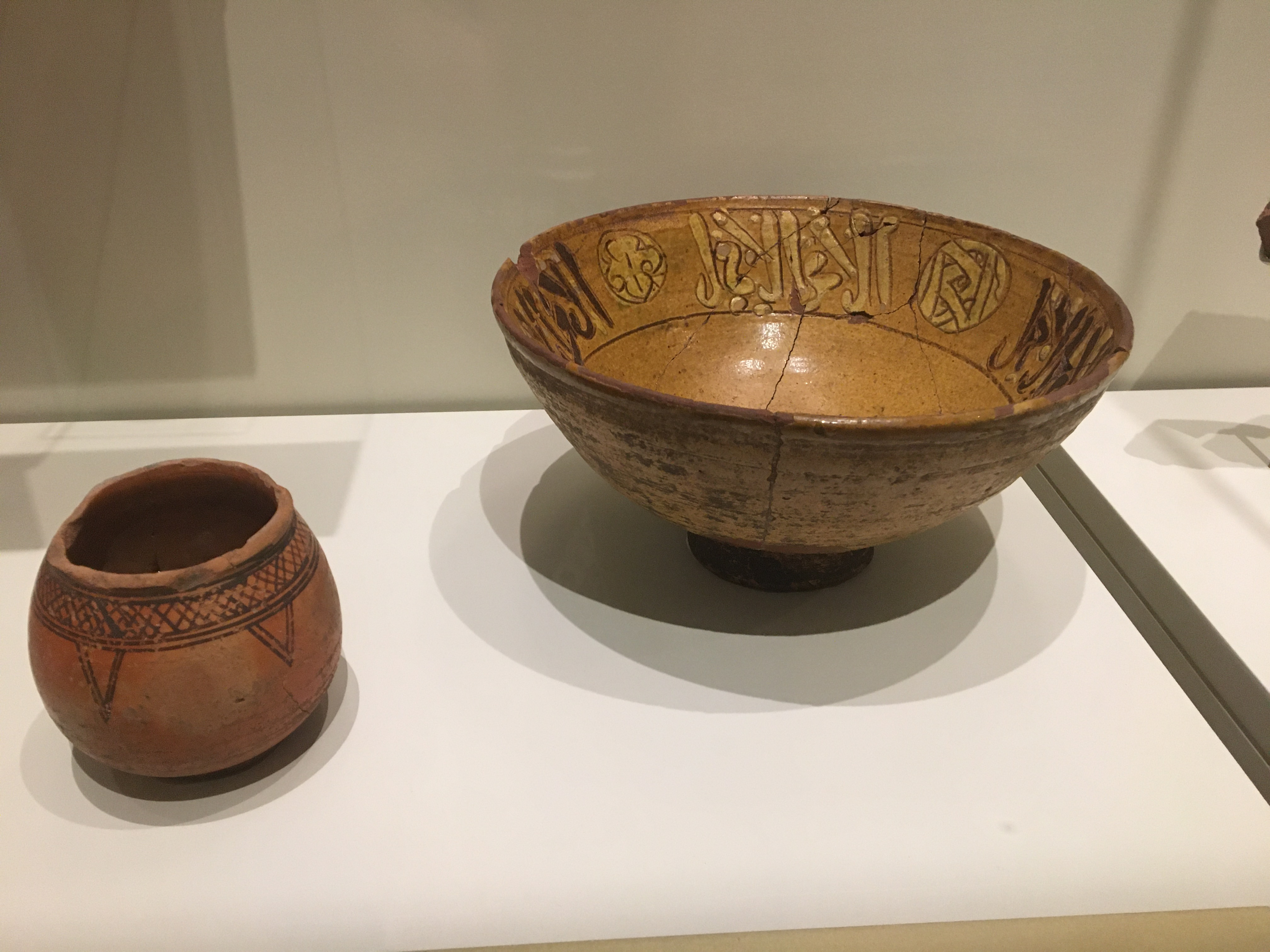
Islamic bowl from Gebel Adda. Royal Ontario Museum
