= El Lahun =

El Lahun اللاهون ⲗⲉϩⲱⲛⲉ
- Village
- Location in Egypt
- Coordinates: 29°14′N 30°58′E
- Country: Egypt
- City: Faiyum

El Lahun (Arabic: اللاهون El Lāhūn, Coptic: ⲗⲉϩⲱⲛⲉ alt. Illahun, Lahun, or Kahun, (the latter being a neologism coined by archaeologist William Matthew Flinders Petrie) is a town and pyramid complex in Faiyum, Egypt founded by Senusret II. The Pyramid of Senusret II (Greek: Sesostris II) is located near the modern town, and is often called the Pyramid of Lahun. The site was occupied during the Middle Kingdom into the late Thirteenth Dynasty, and then again in the New Kingdom. The ancient name of the site was rꜣ-ḥn.t, literally, "Mouth (or Opening) of the Canal". It was known as Ptolemais Hormos (Ancient Greek: Πτολεμαῒς ὅρμος, romanized: port of Ptolemy) in Ptolemaic Egypt. There are multiple areas at El Lahun including the Pyramid of Senwosret II, cemeteries, the Valley temple, and the town of Kahun. It contains many artifacts of daily life like pottery from the Middle Kingdom and evidence of administrative procedures seen on papyri and seals.

== Excavation history ==
El Lahun was initially excavated by William Flinders Petrie in 1889–1890. He mapped the town of Kahun, located the pyramid's entrance, found many objects of daily life, and returned in 1920 to continue his work. His excavations uncovered pottery and other artifacts from the city of Kom. Ludwig Borchardt also worked there in 1899, recording the architecture in Kahun. Borchardt found thousands of papyri related to the temple during his time at Lahun. From 1989 to 1997, Egyptologist Nicholas B. Millet worked there with the University of Toronto. The most recent excavations and work at Lahun are being carried out by Zoltan Horvath and a Hungarian team.

Also found in the town were the Kahun papyri, comprising about 1,000 fragments covering legal, medical, religious, and astronomical matters. Re-excavation of the area in 2009 by Egyptian archaeologists revealed a cache of pharaonic-era mummies in brightly painted wooden coffins in the sand-covered desert rock surrounding the pyramid.

== El Lahun layout ==
=== Pyramid ===
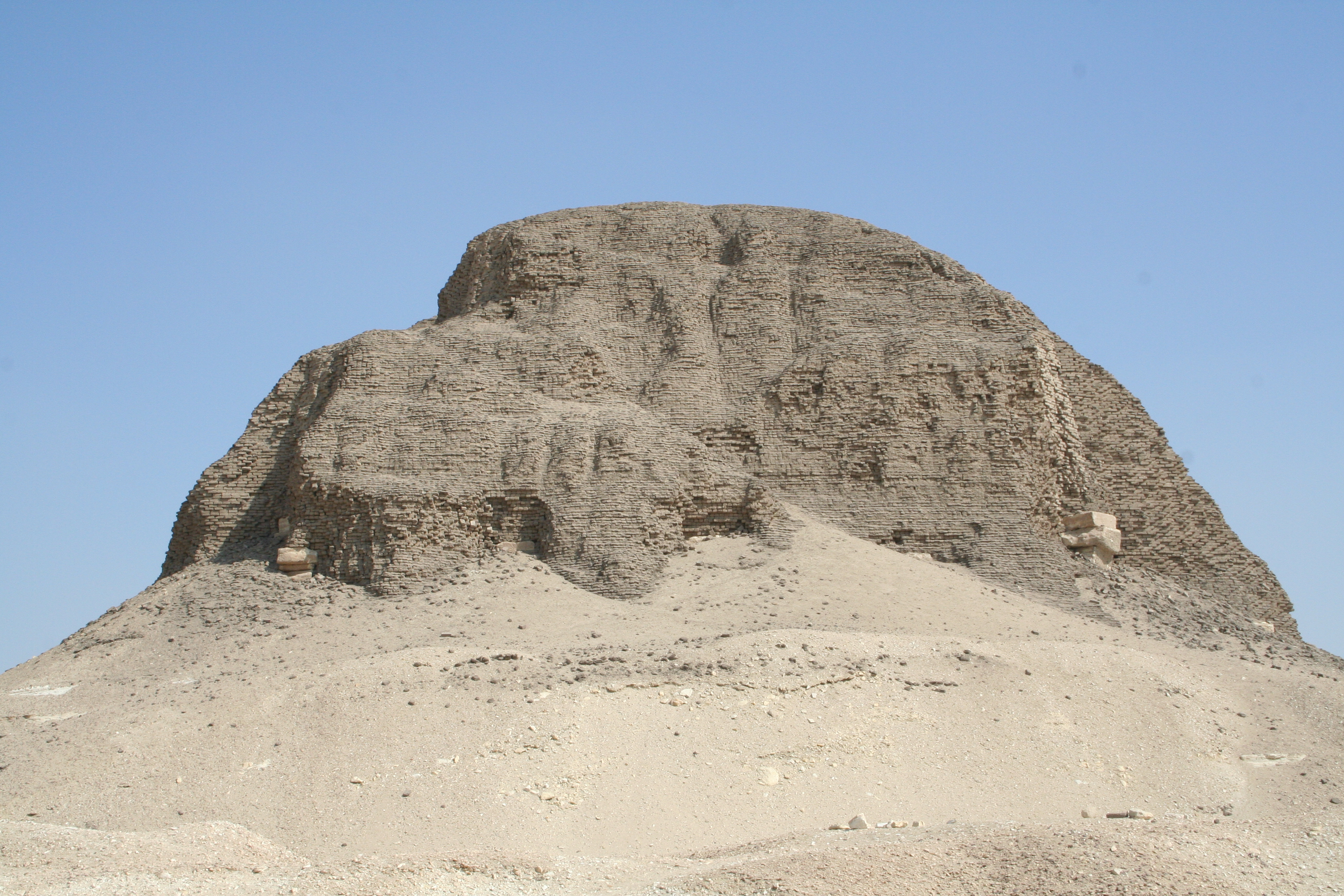
Pyramid of Senusret II at Lahun

The pyramid at Lahun is dedicated to King Senwosret II. It is located west of the town and the first entrance discovered was found on the south side farther away from the pyramid than expected. Like the other Twelfth Dynasty pyramids in the Faiyum, the Pyramid of Lahun is made of mudbrick, but here the core of the pyramid consists of a network of stone walls that were infilled by mudbrick. The pyramid stands on an artificial terrace cut from sloping ground. On the north side many mastabas were found, probably for the burial of personages associated with the royal court. In front of each mastaba is a narrow shaft leading down to the burial chamber underneath. Also on the north side is the Queen's Pyramid or subsidiary pyramid believed to have been for Queen Atmuneferu based on the inscription.

Within the pyramid complex multiple tombs were discovered by Petrie during his excavations. Those buried here were most likely family based on the names found in the tombs and the grave goods. One tomb with a large quantity of grave goods is that of princess Sithathor-yunit, the daughter of the Senwosret II. Artifacts found were a crown, pectorals, bracelets, necklaces, and cowries.

Sithathor-yunet Jewelry

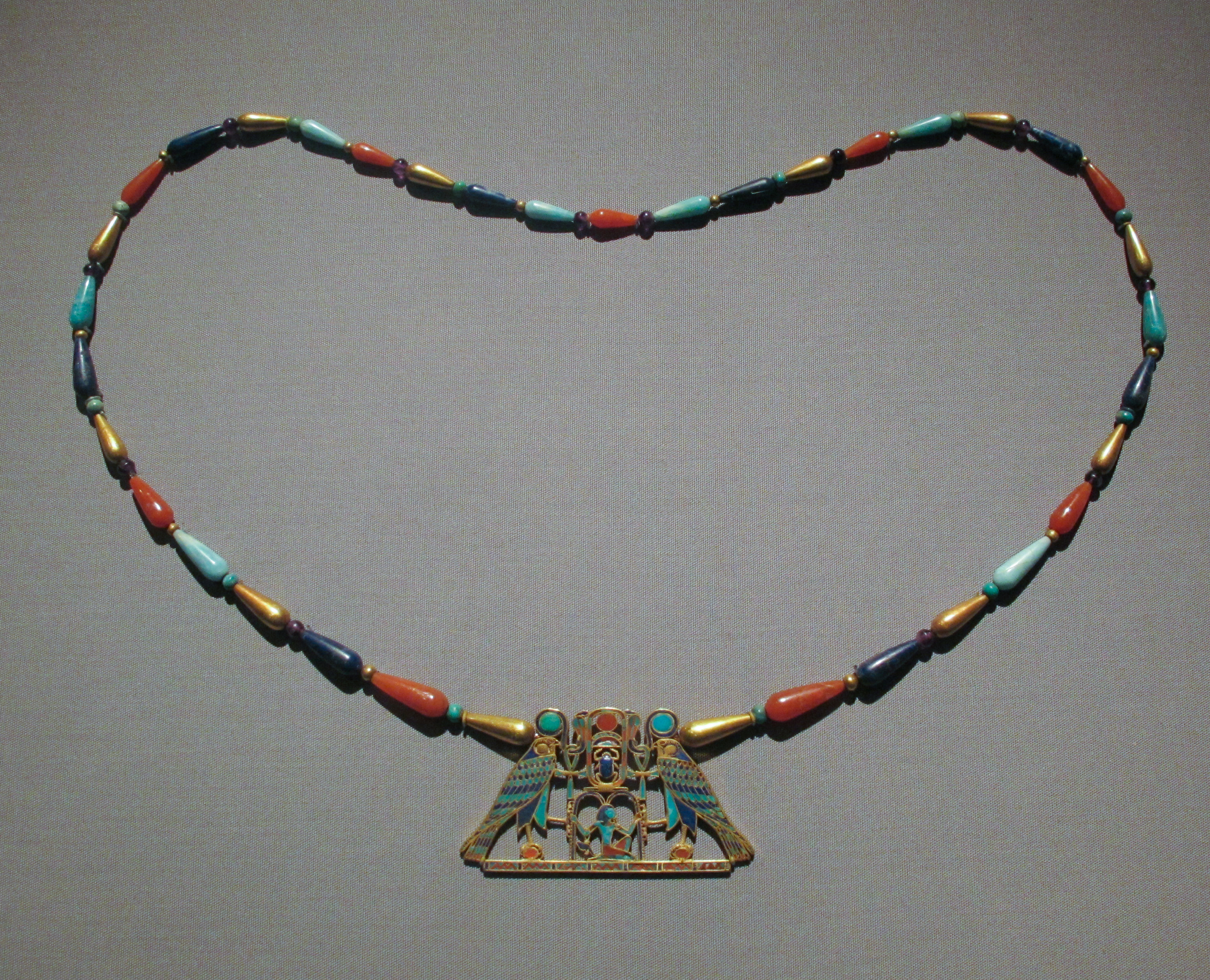
Pectoral of Sithathor-yunet, reign of Senwosret II. Metropolitan Museum of Art.

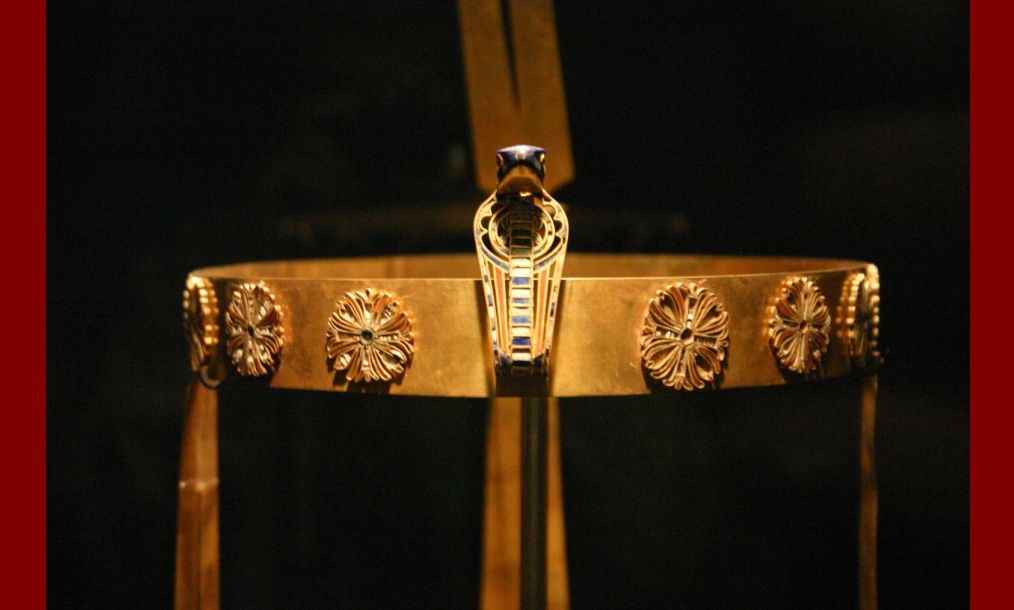
Crown of Sithathor-yunet

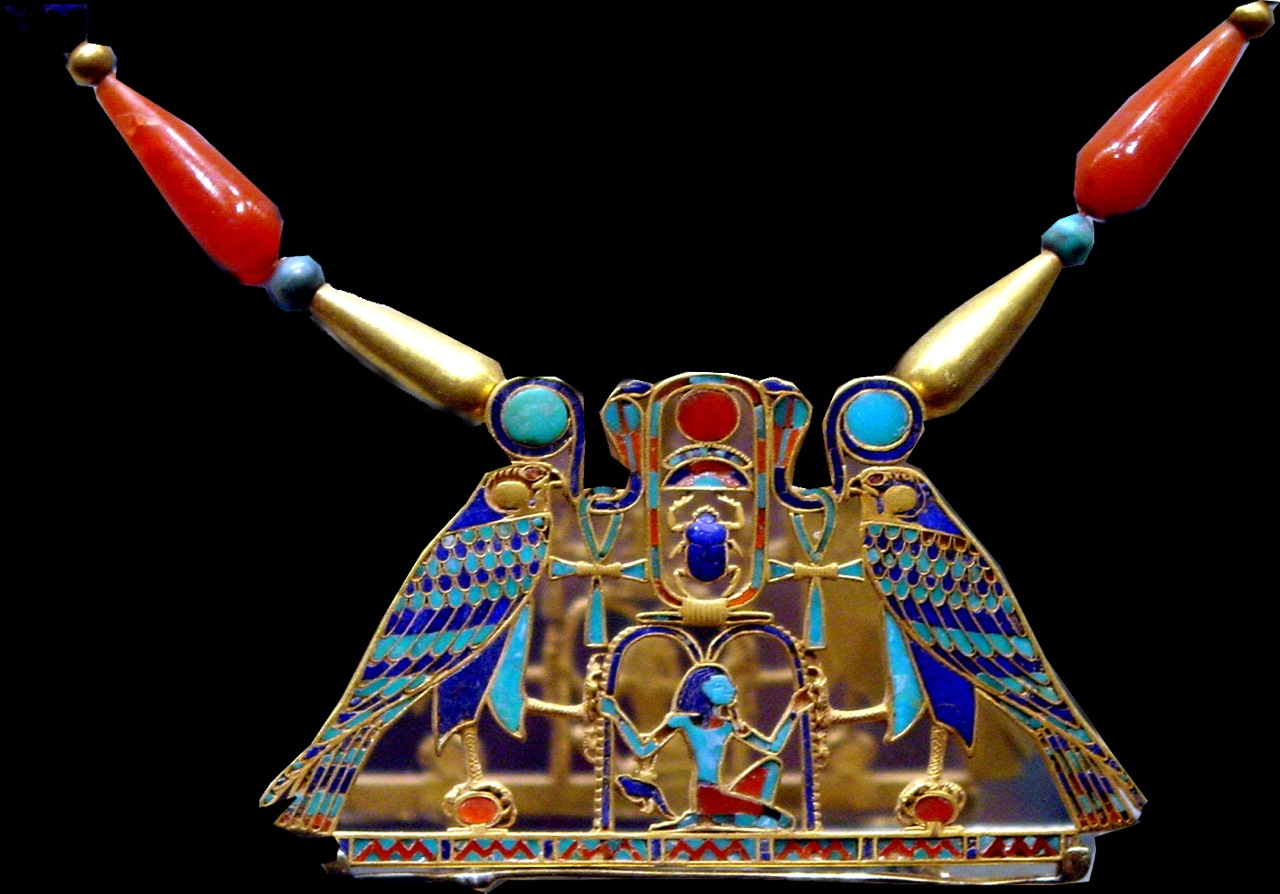
Pectoral of Senusret II

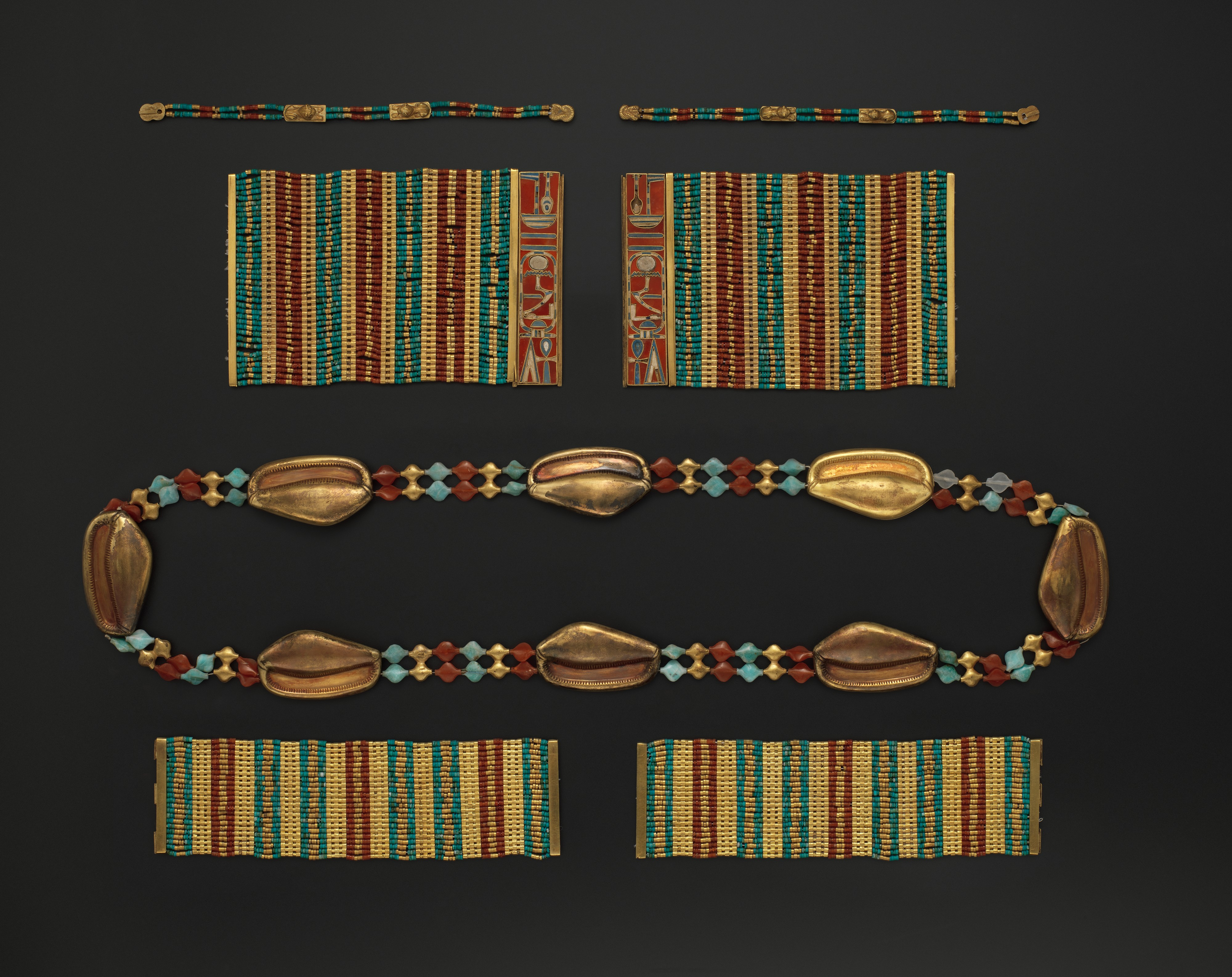
Cowrie Shell Girdle, Lion Bracelets, Bracelets with the Name of Amenemhat III, and Anklets of Princess Sithathoryunet

=== Cemeteries ===
There have been many cemeteries found between the pyramid and the town. There appears to be a mixture of elite burials and pit burials depending on the cemetery. In the Bashkatib cemetery, there have been multiple types of burials found: open graves, shallow shaft tombs, stairway tombs, and deep shaft tombs. Abdel Rahman el-Aydi found four cemeteries with an Egyptian mission. They mostly date to the Middle Kingdom like the rest of the site, but there have been ones that date to the Roman period.

=== Valley Temple ===
The Valley temple at Lahun is located slightly southwest of the town. The temple was most likely used for the royal mortuary cult of Senswosret II. It no longer exists as it lays under modern day cultivation. Originally, it would have been connected to the pyramid, but there is no evidence of a causeway connecting the two areas. There have also been papyri found associated with the temple and the mortuary cult and even a day-book where "letters to and from the mayor were copied". Other papyri at the temple included information about the cult of Anubis that was inside the temple and correspondence between the mayor and temple accountant. These recorded the inventory of the temple and what goods were required for it to operate.

=== Town layout ===
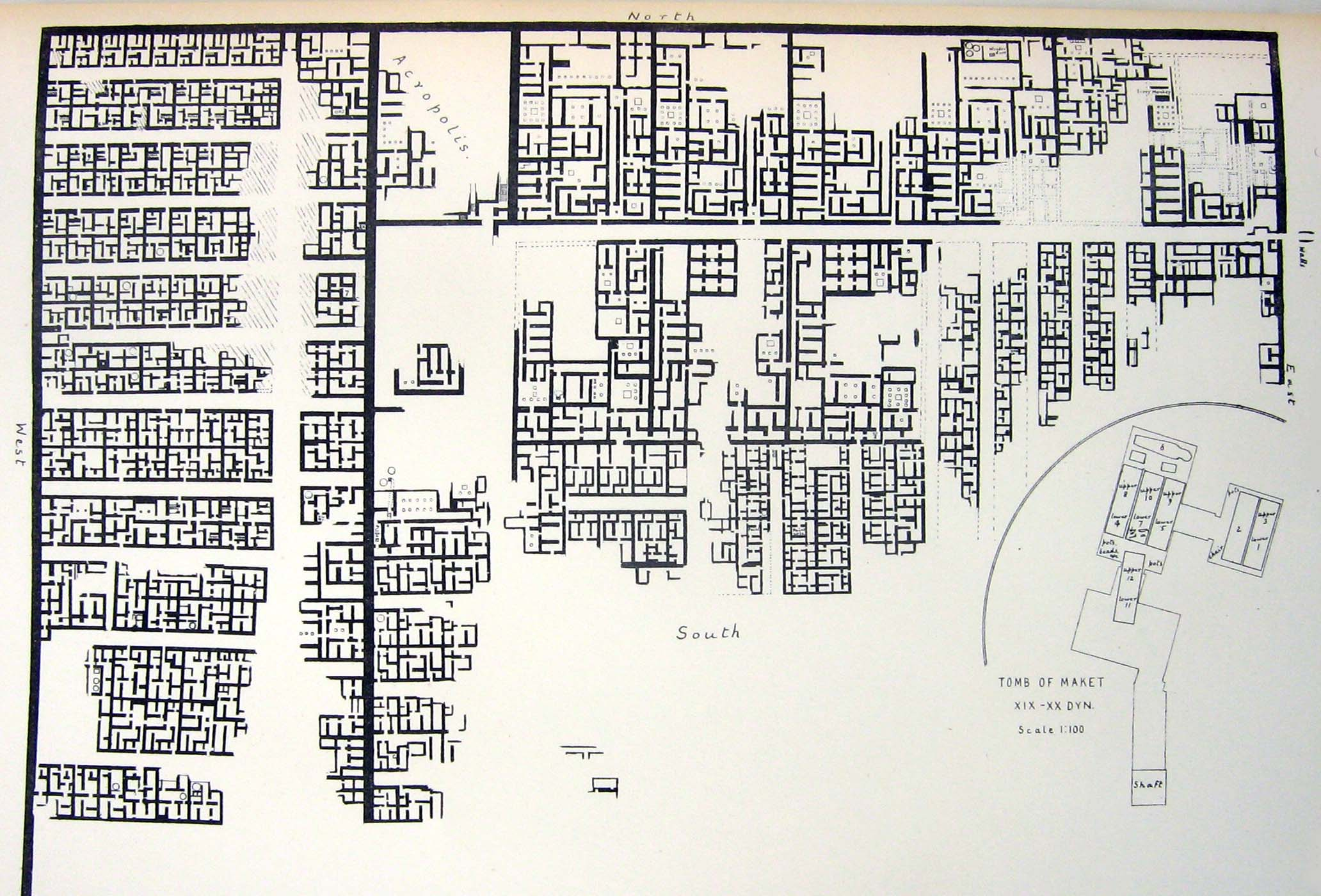
Map of Kahun by Petrie

The village of el Lahun, also known as Kahun, is believed to have been inhabited by the workers who both constructed the pyramid and then served the funerary cult of the king. The main function "has usually been linked to the funerary cult of Senwosret II – whose nearby pyramid complex has been understood as the main reason for its existence – housing administrators, as well as temple staff for the upkeep of his royal mortuary cult." The village is about 1.1 km from the pyramid and lies in the desert a short distance from the edge of cultivation. The town was orthogonally planned, with mudbrick town walls on three sides. The fourth wall may have collapsed and been washed away during the annual inundation or covered due to the cultivation in the area. The town was rectangular in shape and was divided internally by a mudbrick wall running north to south that was added after the initial eastern part of the town was built. This wall divided about one third of the area of the town and created a western section with rows of back-to-back, side-by-side single room houses. The eastern section of the town contains mansions, medium sized houses, and small houses similar to the ones in the western section. The mansions are located in the north part of the eastern section and there are seven in total with four along the northern wall and the other three across the street. The medium and small houses are located east and south of the mansions in the eastern section.

==== Houses ====
In Kahun there are three main types of houses found: mansions, medium size houses, and smaller homes. The mansions are about 2,700 m^{2}, medium are 100-168 m^{2}, and small houses are 50 m^{2} or smaller. The small and medium houses are in the western section, and south and east of the mansions. The houses located in the western section are smaller and much closer together than ones south and east of the mansions.

Multiple artifacts have been found in these houses. In the smaller houses papyri and copper tools have been found which can tell us a little about what the people who lived here did.

==== Mansions and acropolis ====
Mansions were significantly larger than the other houses that most of the workers and villagers lived in. Mansions also contained granaries on one side of the building that could hold enough grain for the entire town. They are located on the north edge of the town next to the northern wall. These mansions were also separated into smaller units within that may have housed the entire family, the staff, and administrative activities. There are also administrative sections in the mansions that contained seals and a few papyri detailing administrative duties and dealings as well as names of individuals.

A major feature of the town was the so-called "acropolis" building. The acropolis is roughly the same size as the other mansions at Lahun and is located at the end of the main street to the west. It is next to the four mansions on the north side. It was most likely made for the mayor based on the seals and seal impressions found. The platform the mudbrick building was built on was carved out of stone that already existed; it was only carved down to create the platform. It rests above the rest of the town on this platform.

== Discoveries ==
=== Papyri and Seals ===
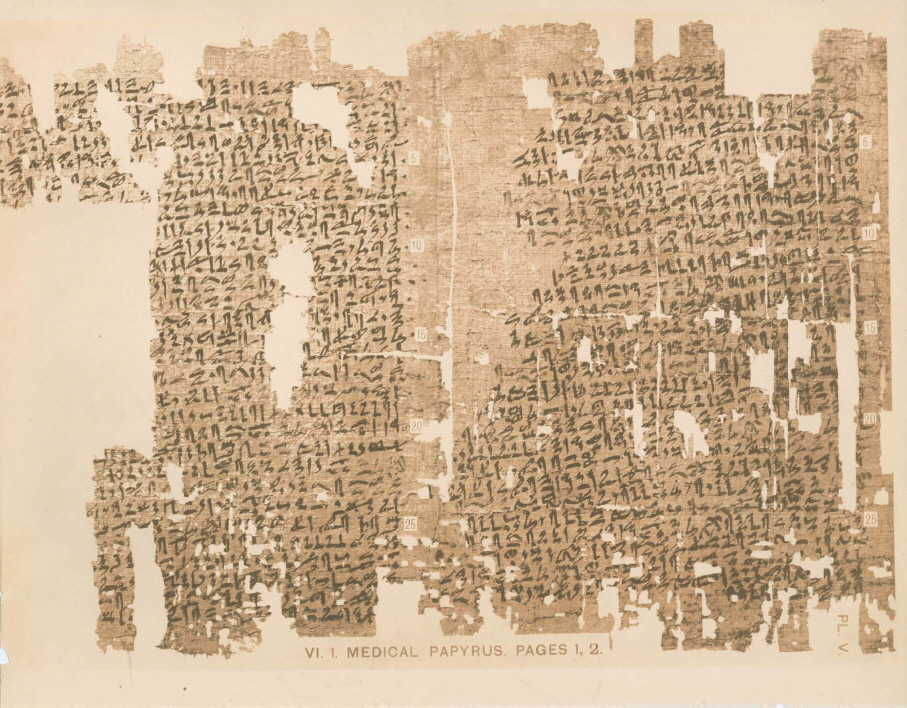
12th Dynasty medical papyrus found at El Lahun

The papyri have been found in multiple areas of Lahun and are on different topics: administrative dealings, the town, and the temple. They had to do with agriculture, temple proceedings, and town organization. Temple documents discuss the daily occurrences at the temple and important information about the temple. There were also census lists that listed the people who lived in the town including soldiers, servants, scribes, and members of certain households. Among the administrative papyri there were legal proceedings recorded including ones on debt. Petrie was the first to propose that the seals and papyri found in the town of Kahun were for administrative purposes which was later supported by other finds including those in 1899 by Ludwig Borchardt.

Many of these papyri also tell stories that were religious or literary. There were ones about the gods and their myths and tales that were found in other sites. Also, papyri dealing with the chronology of the Ancient Egyptian world have been found called Sothic cycle. The papyrus containing the Sothic date was found by Petrie and has narrowed Lahun's establishment to a fifty year timespan during the 12th Dynasty. The papyrus says that it is "Month 8 Day 16 of a Year 7". This date is one of the most definitive dates relating to Ancient Egypt. Knowing this date has allowed Egyptologists to organize the Middle Kingdom around Year 7 of Senwosret III's reign. With other archaeological information from Lahun and other sites they are better able to determine the chronology of Egypt.

The seals were found in some buildings in the town. They were attached to "boxes, vases, and bags" and marked what they contained. They have the names of the people who owned the seals, or inscriptions to someone the object the seal was on was going to. The seals state who the person was and what their title was including high priest, citizen, or inspector. The town was not the only place seals were found. Some were discovered by Petrie in the pyramid, precincts, and other areas during excavations. These ones also had the names of the people and their titles on them.

=== Objects of daily life ===
Other objects of daily life have been found in the town and in the pyramid complex. These include copper tools found in what is believed to be the western workmen's section, flint tools, and pottery which is both local and foreign. The pottery would have included bowls, storage jars, water jars, plates, and other tableware. Cosmetic jars have been found in houses and the most common ones found have been kohl jars. Jewelry has been found in the town and inside tombs that could have been potentially used by the owners in their daily lives or important objects that they waned in their afterlife.

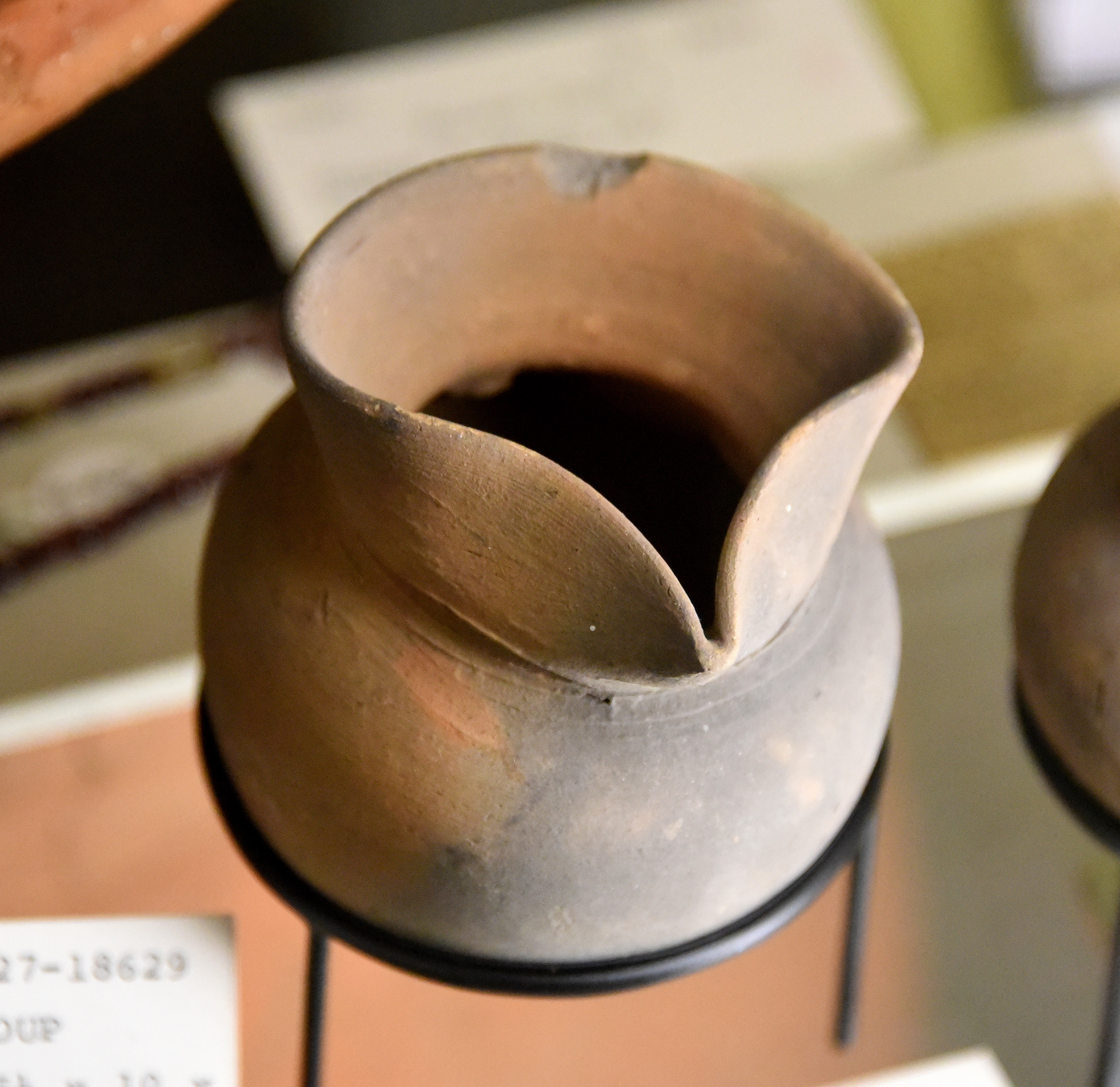
Spouted jar, brown smooth pottery. From a box containing infant burial, with a lock of hair, shell, slip of wood, and beads. 12th Dynasty. From Lahun (Kahun), Faiyum, Egypt. Petrie Museum, London

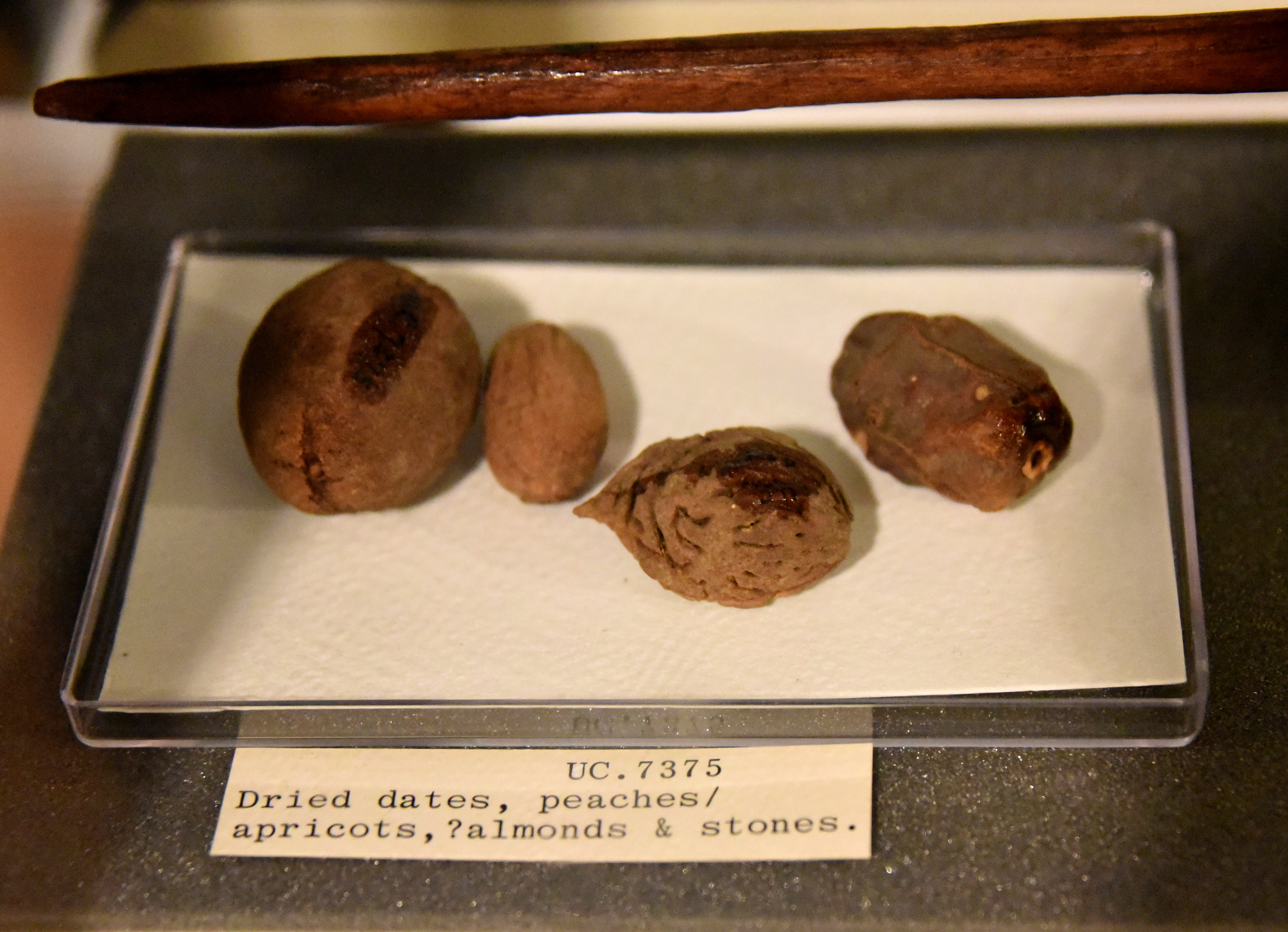
Dried date, peach, apricot, and stones. From Lahun, Fayum, Egypt. Late Middle Kingdom. Petrie Museum, London

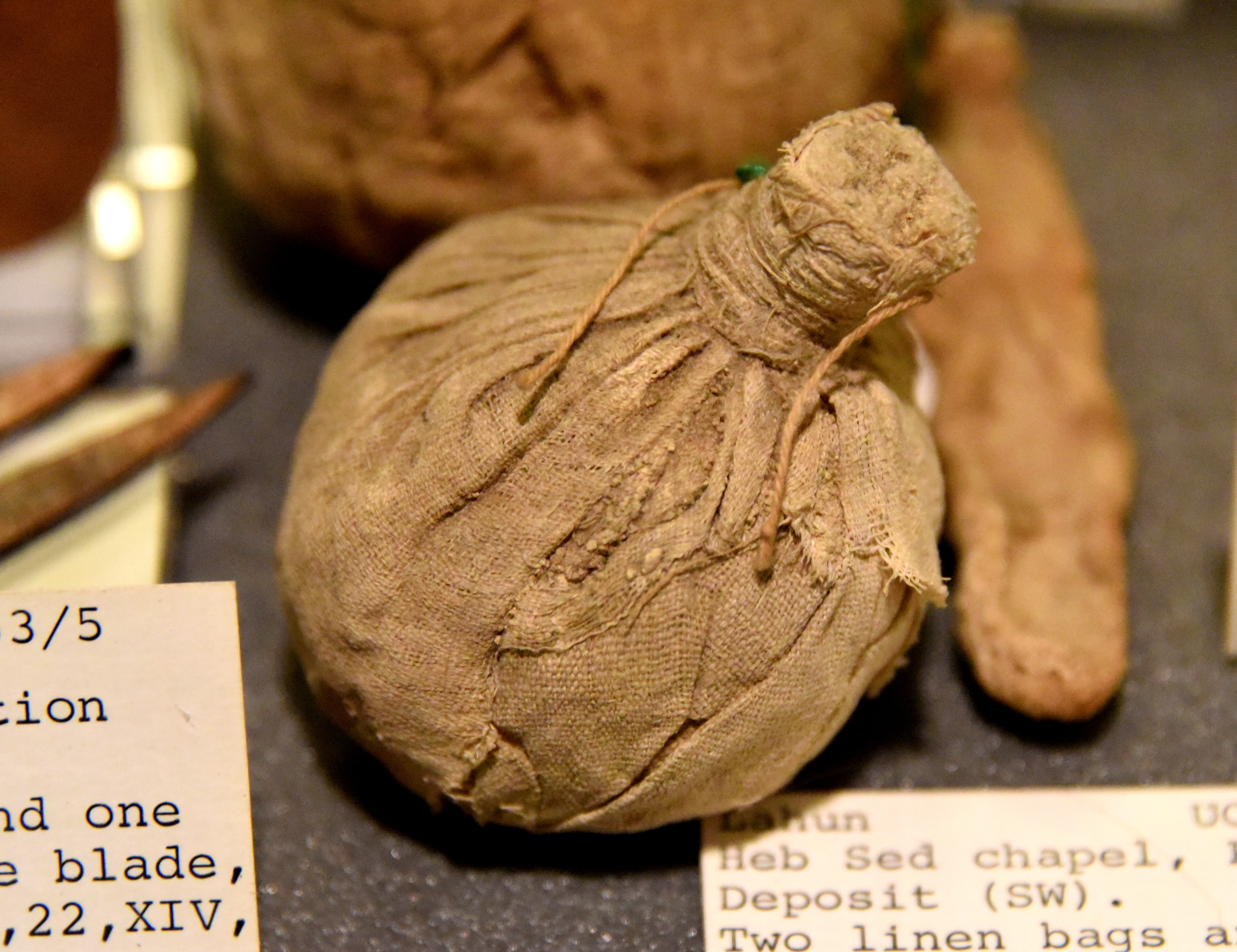
A bag of white linen, unopened. Contains rolls of linen only. Foundation deposit, Heb Sed Chapel at Lahun, Fayum, Egypt. 12th Dynasty. Petrie Museum, London

=== Mummies ===
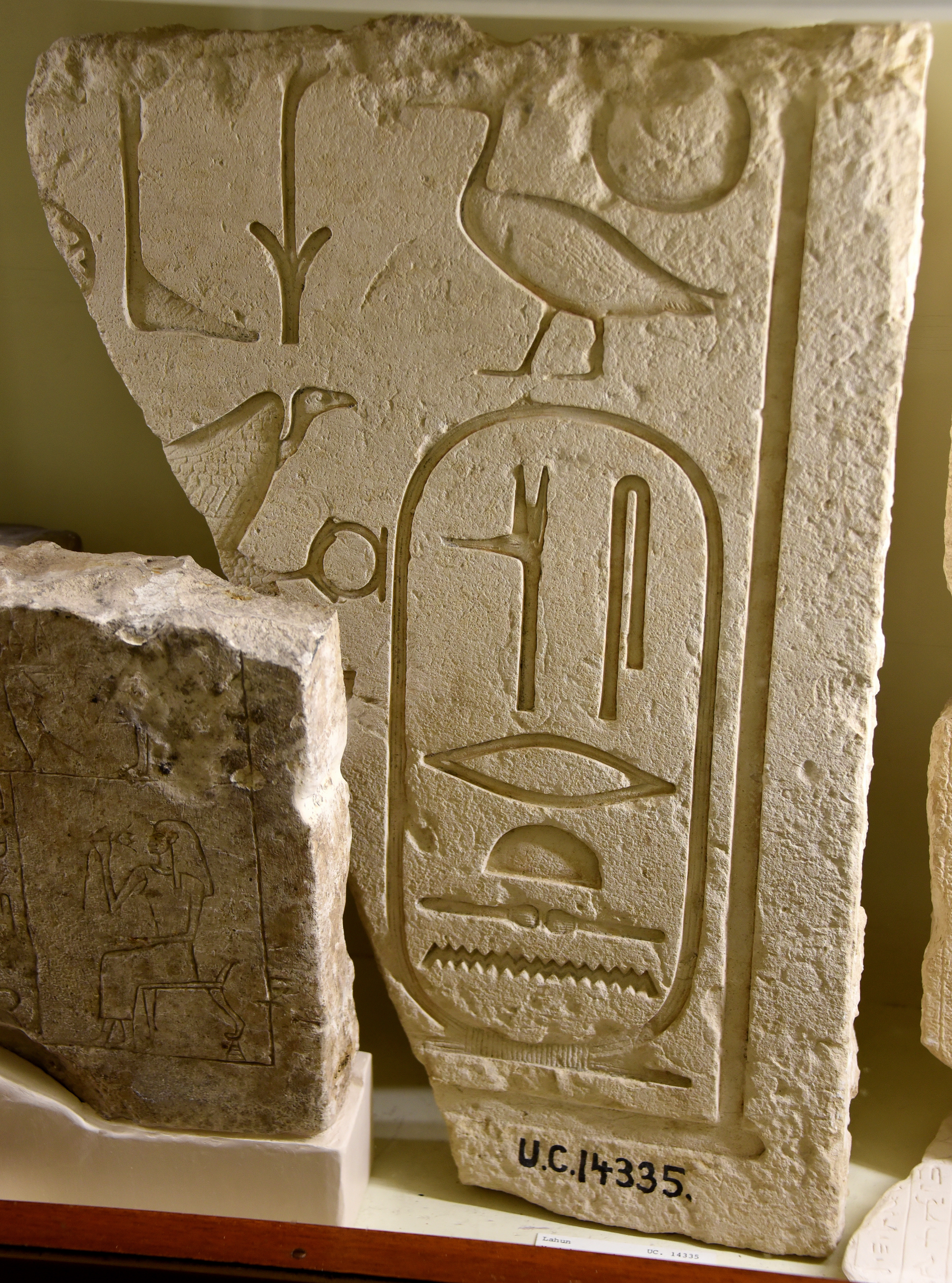
Limestone slab showing the cartouche of Senusret II and name and image of goddess Nekhbet. From Mastaba 4, north side of Senusret II Pyramid at Lahun, Egypt. Petrie Museum, London

In 2009, dozens of pharaonic-era mummies were uncovered near the pyramid of Senwosret II by Abdel Rahman El-Aydi and his team. The sarcophagi were decorated with green, red and white and an image of the person laid to rest there. Archaeologists unearthed multiple well preserved mummies which range from the 12th Dynasty to the 18th Dynasty. Many have prayers inscribed on them with later mummies having texts from the Book of the Dead inscribed on them. Some mummies even contain almost all of the funerary equipment from when the person first died. Multiple mummies also had Egyptian gods depicted on their sarcophagus, like Horus.

== See also ==
- List of ancient Egyptian sites, including sites of temples

== Bibliography ==
- G. Brunton: Lahun I: The Treasure (BSAE 27 en ERA 20 (1914)), London 1920.
- A.R. David: The Pyramid Builders of Ancient Egypt: A Modern Investigation of Pharaoh’s Workforce, London, Boston en Henley 1986.
- B. Gunn: The Name of the Pyramid-Town of Sesostris II, in JEA 31 (1945), p. 106-107.
- B. J. Kemp: Ancient Egypt: Anatomy of a Civilization, London 1989.
- N. Moeller: The Archaeology of Urbanism in Ancient Egypt, Cambridge, England: University of Cambridge Press 2016.
- W.M.F. Petrie, G. Brunton, M. A. Murray: Lahun II (BSAE 33 en ERA 26 (1920)), London 1923.
- W.M.F. Petrie, F. Ll. Griffith, P.E. Newberry: Kahun, Gurob, and Hawara, London 1890.
- W.M.F. Petrie: Illahun, Kahun, and Gurob, London 1891.
- S. Quirke: (ed.), Lahun Studies, New Malden 1998.
- S. Quirke: Lahun: A Town in Egypt 1800 BC, and the History of Its Landscape, London 2005.
- A. Scharff: Illahun und die mit Königsnamen des Mittleren Reiches gebildeten Ortsnamen, in ZÄS 59 (1924), p. 51-55.
- K. Szpakowska: Daily Life in Ancient Egypt: Recreating Lahun, Malden, Oxford, Carlton 2008 ISBN 978-1-4051-1856-9
- H. E. Winlock: The Treasure of el Lahun, New York 1973.
