= Joel ibn Shu'aib =

15th-century Spanish rabbi

Joel ibn Shu'aib (also "Shuiv") (15th century) was a rabbi, preacher, and commentator who was born in Aragon and lived also at Tudela. He wrote the following works:

- Olat Shabbat, sermons, in the order of the Sabbatical sections, written in 1469 (Venice, 1577)
- A commentary on Lamentations, written at Tudela in 1480, and published together with Galante's commentary on the same book (ib. 1483)
- A commentary on Job, mentioned in his Olat Shabbat
- A short commentary on Shir HaShirim (1556)
- Nora Tehillot, a commentary on the Psalms, with a preface by his son Samuel (Salonica, 1568–1569).

== Jewish Encyclopedia bibliography ==
- David Conforte, Ḳore ha-Dorot, p. 28a;
- Giovanni Bernardo De Rossi-C. H. Hamberger, Hist. Wörterb. p. 291;
- Moritz Steinschneider, Cat. Bodl. col. 1400;
- Dukes, in Orient, Lit. ix. 302;
- Graziadio Nepi-Mordecai Ghirondi, Toledot Gedole Yisrael, p. 162.
