= Joelson =

Joelson is both a given name and a surname. Notable people with the name include:

== People with the given name ==
- Joelson Santos Silva or Joelson (born 1980), Brazilian footballer
- Joelson José Inácio (born 1983), Brazilian footballer

== People with the surname ==
- Charles Samuel Joelson (1916–1999), American lawyer and politician
- Tsianina Joelson (born 1975), American actress and fitness model

== See also ==
- Jolson
- Joel (disambiguation)
