= Joel of Makuria =

King of the Christian kingdom of Dotawo

Joel was a 15th-century king of the Christian kingdom of Makuria in late medieval Nubia.

Joel is one of the last kings of Christian Nubia in the historical record. He is known from a graffito in the Faras Cathedral, an inscription in the Church of Tamit, a 1484 letter from the settlement Gebel Adda, and an additional inscription. That multiple attentions survive may be of significance.

Joel ruled shortly before the remaining Christian states in Nubia vanished. He had at least one vassal, "King Tienossi" (ⲧⲓⲉⲛⲟⲥⲥⲏ ⲟⲩⲣⲟⲩⲁ) of Ilenat. Dotawo was likely conquered by the Mamluks under Qaitbay at some point before 1496.

== See also ==
- Makuria & Gebel Adda
- List of kings of Makuria
