= Meinarti =

Coordinates: 21°00′25″N 30°34′40″E

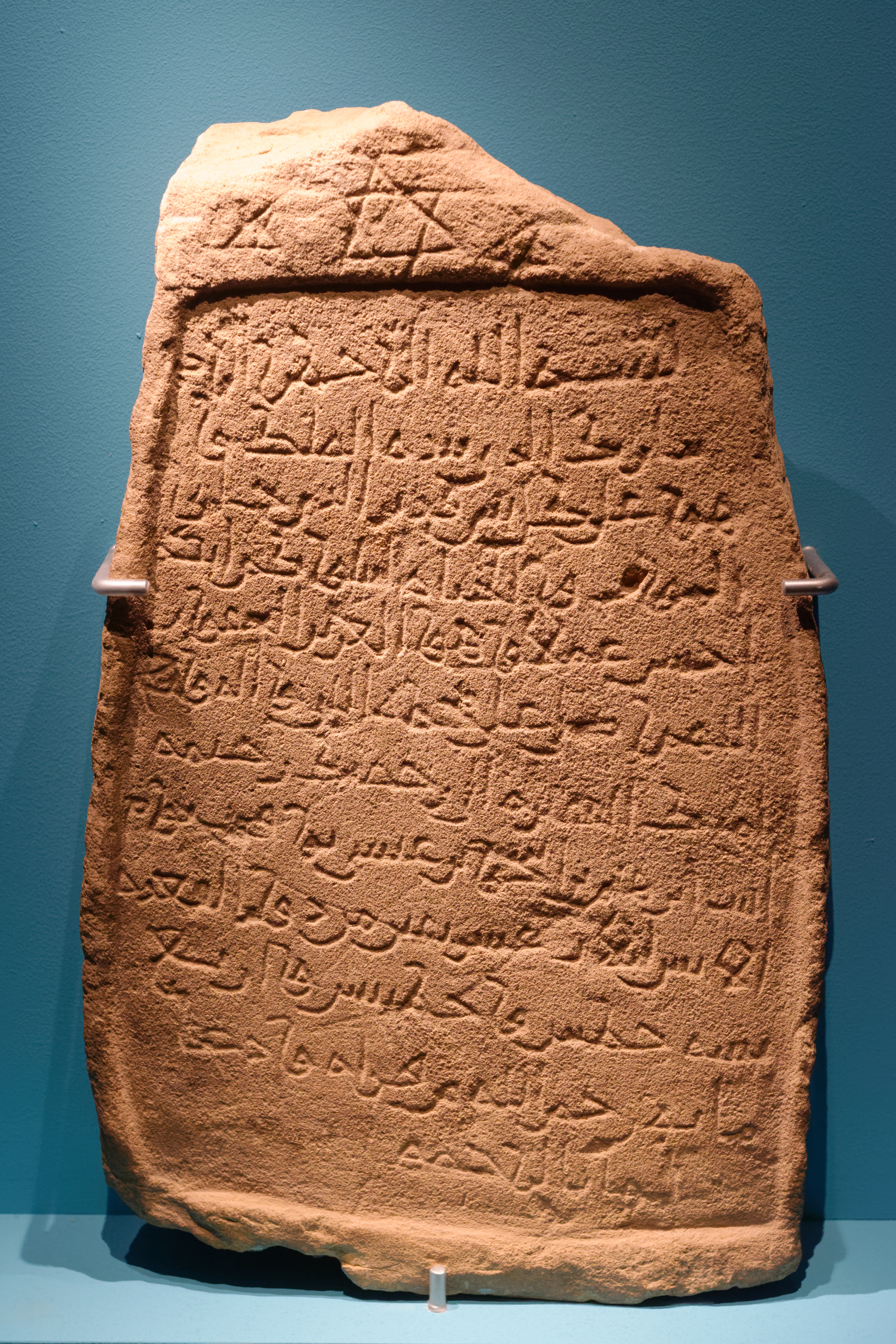
Funerary stele with an Arabic inscription dated 1063, found in Meinarti

Meinarti (also Mainarti) was an island with a Nubian village in northern Sudan. Situated in the Nile, Meinarti was just north of the 2nd Cataract, a few kilometers upstream of the Sudanese border town of Wadi Halfa. On the island was an artificial mount 175m long and 12.5m high, consisting of stratified archaeological remains. When excavated it proved to contain 18 recognizable levels, the result of six separate and distinct phases of occupation. Each phase was followed by a period of abandonment and then a complete rebuilding. Structural remains at all phases were entirely of mud brick. Meinarti was excavated by William Yewdale Adams from 1962 to 1964, prior to perishing in the 1960s with the rising of Lake Nubia due to the Aswan Dam.

The earliest occupation, Phase 1 (= Levels 16–18) occurred during the later, Meroitic phase of the great Nubian empire of Kush. Its beginning coincided more or less with the Roman occupation of Egypt, in 30 BC. The surviving remains included no residences, but three stoutly built public or commercial buildings. The largest was too poorly preserved for definite interpretation. Nearly as large was a walled market compound consisting of shops on either side of a plaza, while nearby was the best preserved wine press ever found in Nubia. It was used only for a short time, and was abandoned and filled with trash well before the end of Phase 1, which seems to have been the result of flood destruction. The remains were entirely sanded over before the beginning of Phase 2 (Levels 13–15), which probably occurred around AD 350. This was a time when the Empire of Kush collapsed, leaving only the somewhat impoverished remnant kingdom of Ballaña in the region around Meinarti. The surviving remains bore no resemblance to those of Phase 1, consisting entirely of a tight cluster of small and irregular peasant dwellings. Like those of earlier times, they were eventually abandoned and sanded over.

Christianity was introduced to Nubia in the later fifth century, and Meinarti was reoccupied not long afterward, perhaps around AD 650, at Phase 3 (Levels 11–12). The remains at these levels were extremely poorly preserved, with few walls standing above 40 cm, as a result of repeated flooding. The place appeared to have been once again a peasant village, although there were denuded foundations of a couple of larger and more stoutly built buildings, of undetermined function. Clearly recognizable however were the foundations of Meinarti's first church, which had a flooring of red cobblestones with a white cross pattern in the center. The church as first built had a curiously skewed plan, the corners deviating by more than 15 degrees from a right angle, but it was very soon rebuilt on a more regular plan. Unlike all other buildings at Meinarti it remained in use though successive periods Phases 3–5), with numerous modifications necessitated by constantly accumulating sand.

Phase 4 (Levels 7–10) probably began around AD 950. This was a time when Christian Nubia enjoyed especially cordial and prosperous relations with Fatimid Egypt, as is clearly reflected in the archaeological remains. They were once again a tight cluster of peasant residences, but they were notably more spacious than in any earlier period. The typical house had a sizable front room, behind it one or two smaller store rooms, and an L-shaped passage leading beside and then behind the store rooms, and ending in a latrine, with ceramic toilet fixture, at the back of the house. Nothing comparable to this feature has been found from any earlier period in Nubian history. One house was presumably the residence of an important official; its main room was whitewashed and was adorned with a number of protective inscriptions, and it had no fewer than four store rooms. The houses at Phase 4 were far and away the best preserved in the site, with some preserved to the level of the original roofs. The settlement was nevertheless once more abandoned after a century or two, and the houses thereafter completely buried in sand.

Phase 5 (Levels 3–6) probably began around AD 1200. This was a time of somewhat disturbed political and military conditions in Egypt and the Near East, due in part to the intrusion of the Crusaders. Christian Nubia was not wholly unaffected, due to the threat of Egyptian invasion as well as to dynastic quarrels. Meinarti assumed a new strategic importance, and became a sometime residence of the Eparch of Nobadia (the viceroy of northern Nubia), although his normal capital was Qasr Ibrim. The archaeological remains at this phase, at any rate, were quite unlike those of any earlier period; they consisted mainly of a sprawling complex of more than 80 contiguous rooms. Most were quite small, but at the center was a complex of large rooms having whitewashed walls, and in one case mural paintings in red, yellow, and black. Most were somewhat abstract in character, and were wholly unlike the numerous paintings found in Nubian churches. None of the rooms, large or small, exhibited any residential features. It seems probable that the whole complex was built for the use of the Eparch, the smaller rooms being stone rooms for goods in transit through the cataract. In addition to the "eparchal complex" there were three or more ordinary residences. Their design was similar to that of the houses of Phase 4, but they were more stoutly built and were in all cases freestanding, not adjoining any other building. Phase 5 came to an end when, in AD 1365, the Eparch ordered the evacuation of the whole of northern Nubia in the fact of a Mamluk invasion from Egypt.

Phase 6 (Level 2) probably began in AD 1400 or later. By this time the southern Christian kingdoms of Makouria and Alwa had been overrun by nomad invaders and disappeared. In the north Nobadia survived as a splinter kingdom, saved from nomad invasion by the total lack of pasturage in the surrounding desert. The one surviving building was a massive mud brick "castle-house with high vaulted chambers," originally two stories high though the upper story was mostly cleared off in the nineteenth century. It was one of more than a dozen similar buildings erected in the area at and beyond the Second Nile Cataract, at the end of the Middle Ages. Living arrangements, including toilets, were on the upper floor, while those below were designed entirely for the safe storage of goods. A peculiarity of all these structures was that some (sometimes all) of the ground-floor rooms had no lateral entrances; they could be entered only through the roof. The "castle-houses" were long supposed to be of Ottoman origin, but the specimen at Meinarti bore a Greek inscription with the names MIXAEL RAPHAEL GABRIEL running in a repeating succession around the walls of one room, clearly attesting a Christian origin. The building and more others like it had however remained in use well into the Ottoman period. Nearly all the "castle-houses" were built on islands, presumably for added security. At all other sites except Meinarti they were accompanied by more conventional dwellings, which must surely have been the case at Meinarti although none survived. This was the topmost level of the mound, and was subject to continual wind erosion and slumpage.

The final abandonment of Meinarti as a Nubian settlement undoubtedly coincided with the end of Christian Nubian civilization, around AD 1500. Around 1890 the Anglo-Egyptian garrison at the nearby town of Wadi Halfa cleared off most of the upper floor of the Meinarti "castle-house" and installed a gun emplacement. In the course of the excavations this was designated as Level 1.
