= Nicholas Millet =

American Egyptologist (1934–2004)

Dr. Nicholas Byram Millet
- Born: June 28, 1934; Richmond, New Hampshire
- Died: May 19, 2004 (aged 69)
- Occupation: Egyptologist

Dr. Nicholas Byram Millet (June 28, 1934 – May 19, 2004) was an Egyptologist affiliated with the Royal Ontario Museum and the University of Toronto. An archaeologist, art historian, linguist, museum curator, administrator, and celebrated teacher, Millet was able to make great strides in the daunting task of translating the lost language of the ancient Sudan, Meroitic. His careful study of the unusual script led to the decipherment of a number of Meroitic words, phrases, and verb formations, and helped shed some light on the social and political constructs of this mysterious civilization. No one else has approached his level of contribution to knowledge of this important ancient African empire. Millet's final word on the Meroitic language was published posthumously in "The Meroitic Inscriptions from Gebel Adda", The Journal of the Society for the Study of Egyptian Antiquities in 2005.

Millet also excavated in Nubia during the Aswan Dam salvage campaign of the 1960s, where he served as director of the Gebel Adda Expedition for the American Research Center in Egypt. In Egypt he worked at a number of sites, including, in the 1990s, Illahun, which is in the Fayoum district of Egypt — a site first excavated by Sir William Flinders Petrie in the late 19th century.

Millet spearheaded a mummy autopsy in 1977. In 1978, working with Dr. Peter Lewin at the Hospital for Sick Children in Toronto, he carried out the world’s first computed tomographic (CT) scan of a mummy, one that had been in the ROM’s collection since 1910. (Millet had previously published a discussion of the decorative scheme on the casing of the mummy that was scanned: "An old mortality", Rotunda, Vol. 5, no. 2, Spring 1972, which was later reprinted, with annotation by R. Shaw and G. Gibson in Rotunda. Vol. 38, no.2, Winter 2004/2005, p. 14-21.) Since then such studies have exploded, remaining a topic of great interest to both professional researchers and the general public.

Millet's research and publications were also impressive and included work on the rediscovery of one of the Punt reliefs of the temple of Hatshepsut at Deir el-Bahri, the authoritative entry on scarabs in the 1968 edition of the Encyclopædia Britannica, a series of excavation reports and a great number of studies on a wide array of Egyptological topics.

Born June 28, 1934 at Richmond, New Hampshire, he received most of his early education abroad, as his father served in the American Diplomatic Corps. After completing his B.A. and his master's at the Oriental Institute of the University of Chicago in 1959, he spent three years as director of the American Research Center in Egypt (ARCE), in Cairo. He returned to the United States to complete his Ph.D. at Yale University. In 1968 he became assistant professor of Egyptology at Harvard. He then moved to Canada to the Royal Ontario Museum, Toronto, in 1970 where he was appointed associate curator and later full curator in the Egyptian Department, as well as associate professor of Egyptology in the Department of Near Eastern Studies (later the Dept. of Near and Middle Eastern Civilizations) of the University of Toronto.

Millet had a long association with The Society for the Study of Egyptian Antiquities, a Canada-based society for the promotion of the study of ancient Egypt in Canada. He was a founding member of the Society and served as its President from 1987-1990. He remained a member of the Society's Board of Trustees until a few years before his death. He also served on the Editorial Board of the Journal of the SSEA [JSSEA] from its founding in 1970 until his death. After the Foundation of a local Chapter of The SSEA in Toronto in 2008, a Scholarship in his name was set up for Egyptology students at the University of Toronto.
