= Yoel Chehanovich =

Israeli footballer

Yoel Chehanovich 'יואל צחנוביץ
Personal information
- Full name: Yoel Chehanovich
- Date of birth: 26 July 1993 (age 33)
- Place of birth: Katzrin, Israel
- Position: Forward

Youth career
- 2005–2006: F.C. Golan Katzrin
- 2006–2013: Ironi Kiryat Shmona

Senior career*
Years	Team	Apps	(Gls)
2011–2017	Ironi Kiryat Shmona	39	(1)
2016	→ Hapoel Afula (loan)	2	(0)
2019	Hapoel Ramat haSharon	0	(0)
- * Club domestic league appearances and goals

Yoel Chehanovich (Hebrew: יואל צחנוביץ'; born July 26, 1993), is an Israeli footballer who played as a forward. He played in the Israeli Premier League for Ironi Kiryat Shmona.
