= Joel DeLisa =

American physiatrist

Joel A. DeLisa MD MS is an American physiatrist. DeLisa was the Professor and Chairman of Department of Physical Medicine and Rehabilitation at Rutgers-New Jersey Medical School (formerly the University of Medicine and Dentistry, New Jersey) in Newark, New Jersey and was the Founder and President and chief executive officer of Kessler Medical Rehabilitation Research & Education Corporation in West Orange, New Jersey. He retired from these positions in 2012. In March 2008, DeLisa was named chairman of the Board of the American Board of Medical Specialties which oversees the certification of physicians nationwide.
