= Joel, Georgia =

Unincorporated community in Georgia, U.S.

Coordinates: 33°28′32″N 85°14′17″W

Joel is an unincorporated community in Carroll County, in the U.S. state of Georgia.

== History ==
A post office called Joel was established in 1881, and remained in operation until 1904. Joel F. Yates, an early postmaster, gave the community his first name.
