= Joel Spitzer =

American smoking cessation educator (born c. 1957)

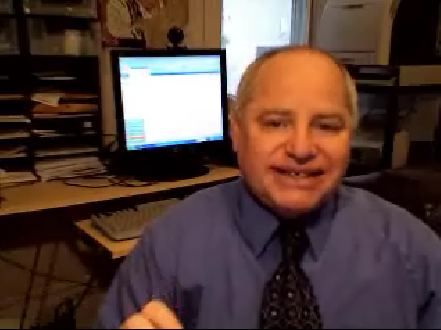
- Spitzer in a 2006 video at WhyQuit
- Known for: "Never take another puff"
- Scientific career
- Fields: Smoking cessation

Joel Spitzer (born c. 1957) is an American smoking cessation educator. He currently serves as technical advisor at WhyQuit.com, a free nicotine dependence recovery website. All of his videos and writings on WhyQuit.com end with his advice, "Never Take Another Puff!"

== Early career ==
Spitzer began presenting smoking prevention seminars at the age of 14 in 1971 as a volunteer speaker for the American Cancer Society (ACS). By the time he was a senior in high school, he was lecturing in medical schools and at professional medical conferences. In 1977, he became Smoking Program Coordinator for the Chicago Unit of the ACS.

In 1978, Spitzer became the smoking programs coordinator for the Rush North Shore Medical Center in Skokie, Illinois — the first hospital-based prevention program in the United States. Although the program was a 3-year pilot, he stayed for 22 years. At his lectures, perhaps a hundred people would listen and not speak to him, but the medical center gave him a feeling of purpose. He wrote, "I called the people from my first group daily and they called and kept in touch with me."

From 2000 through 2008, Spitzer provided smoking cessation and prevention services for the Evanston Department of Health and Human Services and Skokie Health Departments. The clinic was funded by the Tobacco Master Settlement Agreement and educated people as to why they smoke, why they should stop, how to stop, and how to stay off cigarettes. Since 1972, Spitzer has conducted more than 350 six-session stop smoking clinics to over 4,500 participants, and 690 one-session seminars to approximately 100,000 people.

Spitzer himself has never smoked a cigarette. He answered this complaint at nearly every clinic by pointing out that smoking cessation teachers (who often assume that they were "typical" smokers) think that what worked for them will work the same for everybody. Instead, Spitzer bases his efforts on observation and analysis of the successes and failures of those attending his clinics.

== Cold turkey ==
Spitzer wrote more than 100 stop smoking articles for his clinic graduates; in 2000, he began to share them with sites on the Internet. John R. Polito, who founded WhyQuit.com in 1999 and is the site's editor, said, "I've yet to locate anyone who has presented more quitting programs than Joel. He's not only the Hank Aaron/Babe Ruth of smoking cessation, like Peter Jennings, his wisdom and insights seem to be in a league of their own." Spitzer compiled most of the letters in a 149-page book called Never Take Another Puff which is available for free download in keeping with his philosophy that quitting smoking should be free. The book has been downloaded over 2.4 million times.

Although doctors give cold turkey a 10% success rate (and only 5%–10% of quitters are successful on any given attempt), Spitzer encourages smokers to quit cold turkey. Still, cold turkey continues to prevail over pharmacotherapy quitters in most real-world quitting method surveys.

Spitzer discourages cutting down first, and discourages the use of nicotine replacement therapy (NRT). He believes that no one advocates quitting cold turkey because no money is made from it. "There’s no easy way out of a drug addiction," he said. "It's really hard to quit by cold turkey but it's almost impossible by cutting down. If you have a choice between hard and impossible, go for hard."
