= Joël (musician) =

- Born: Joël Lobban; 1996 or 1997 (age 29–30)
- Origin: Toronto, Ontario, Canada
- Genre: Alternative R&B
- Occupation: Singer/Songwriter/Dancer
- Years active: 2018–present
- Website: www.grungegospel.com

Joël Lobban, known professionally as Joël, is a Canadian singer/songwriter/dancer from Toronto, Ontario. He makes alternative R&B music. Pigeons & Planes named Joël in their March 2019 article one of '11 Rising Artists Who Defy Genre'.

== Discography ==
Joël released two singles in 2017. "Stuck With Me" was released in summer 2017 and "Brandy" was released in late 2017. The single "Vent" was released on November 30, 2018, worldwide, followed up by "Type" on February 22, 2019. He is currently working on an album called 'Grunge Gospel' with producer Colin Munroe.

== Music videos ==
The official music video for "Vent" was a DIY video shot in a warehouse and was released on December 23, 2018.
