= C. H. Hamberger =

- Died: March 2, 1847
- Writing career
- Pen name: H. A. M. Berger
- Language: German

C. H. Hamberger (died March 2, 1847) was a medical doctor and writer of Leipzig, Germany.

Hamberger translated G. B. de Rossi's work, Dizionario Storico degli Autori Ebrei, into German under the title Historisches Wörterbuch der Jüdischen Schriftsteller und Ihrer Werke (Leipzig, 1839). He also published Nordische Götterlehre in 1826 under the pseudonym "H. A. M. Berger." This work was later republished with the title Nordische Mythologie, bearing his real name, in Zittau in 1835.
