= Joëlle =

Joëlle is a French feminine given name, the feminine form of Joel. Notable people with the name include:

- Joëlle Aubron (1959–2006), French anarchist
- Joëlle Békhazi (born 1987), Canadian water polo player
- Joëlle Bergeron (born 1949), French politician
- Joëlle Bernard (1928–1977), French actress
- Joëlle Bilé (born 1972)), Congolese journalist and entrepreneur
- Joëlle Boutin (born 1979), Canadian politician
- Joëlle Brupbacher (1978–2011), Swiss mountaineer
- Joëlle Cartaux, French figure skater
- Joëlle Ceccaldi-Raynaud (born 1951), French politician
- Joëlle De Brouwer (born 1950), French runner
- Joëlle Garriaud-Maylam (born 1955), French politician
- Joëlle Jones (born 1980), American comics artist
- Joëlle Kapompolé (born 1971), Belgian politician
- Joëlle Léandre (born 1951), French double bassist
- Joëlle Milquet (born 1961), Belgian politician
- Joëlle Mogensen (1953–1982), French singer
- Joëlle Morosoli (born 1951), Canadian artist
- Joëlle Mbumi Nkouindjin (born 1986), Cameroonian athlete
- Joëlle van Noppen (1980–2010), Dutch singer
- Joëlle Numainville (born 1987), Canadian cyclist
- Joëlle Rollo-Koster, French historian
- Joëlle Sabourin (born 1972), Canadian curler
- Joëlle Ursull (born 1960), French singer
- Joëlle Wintrebert (born 1949), French writer

== See also ==
- Joel (given name)
- Joelle (given name)
