= Joely =

List of similar names

Joely is a given name. It is a variation of either the name Joelle or Joel. Notable people with this name include:

== Feminine name ==
- Joely Andrews (born 2002), Northern Irish footballer
- Joely Collins (born 1972), British-Canadian actress and producer, daughter of musician Phil Collins
- Joely Fisher (born 1967), American actress and singer, daughter of singer Eddie Fisher and actress Connie Stevens
- Joely Richardson (born 1965), English actress, daughter of Vanessa Redgrave and Tony Richardson

== Masculine name ==
- Joely Rodríguez (born 1991), Dominican MLB baseball player
