= Joelle =

Joelle is a feminine given name, and may refer to:

== Real people ==
- Joelle, English-Austrian actress and singer
- Joelle Behlok, Lebanese television presenter and winner Miss Lebanon 1997
- Joelle Carter (born 1972), American actress
- Joelle Fishman (born 1946), American politician, writer and editor
- Joelle Fletcher (born 1990), American television personality and real estate developer
- Joelle Forte (born 1986), American figure skater
- Joelle Franzmann (born 1978), German triathlete
- Joelle Gilbert (born 1999), Gibraltarian footballer
- Joelle Hadjia (born 1990), Australian singer
- Joelle James, American singer and songwriter
- Joelle Khoury (born 1963), Lebanese pianist, jazz and contemporary classical music composer
- Joelle King (born 1988), New Zealand squash player
- Joelle Martin, American politician
- Joelle Murray (born 1986), Scottish footballer
- Joelle Siwa (born 2003), American dancer, singer, and YouTuber
- Joelle Wallach (born 1946), American composer

== Fictional characters ==
- Joelle van Dyne, in the 1996 novel Infinite Jest

== See also ==
- Joel (given name)
- Joëlle (given name)
