= Joëlle Morosoli =

Canadian sculptor (born 1951)

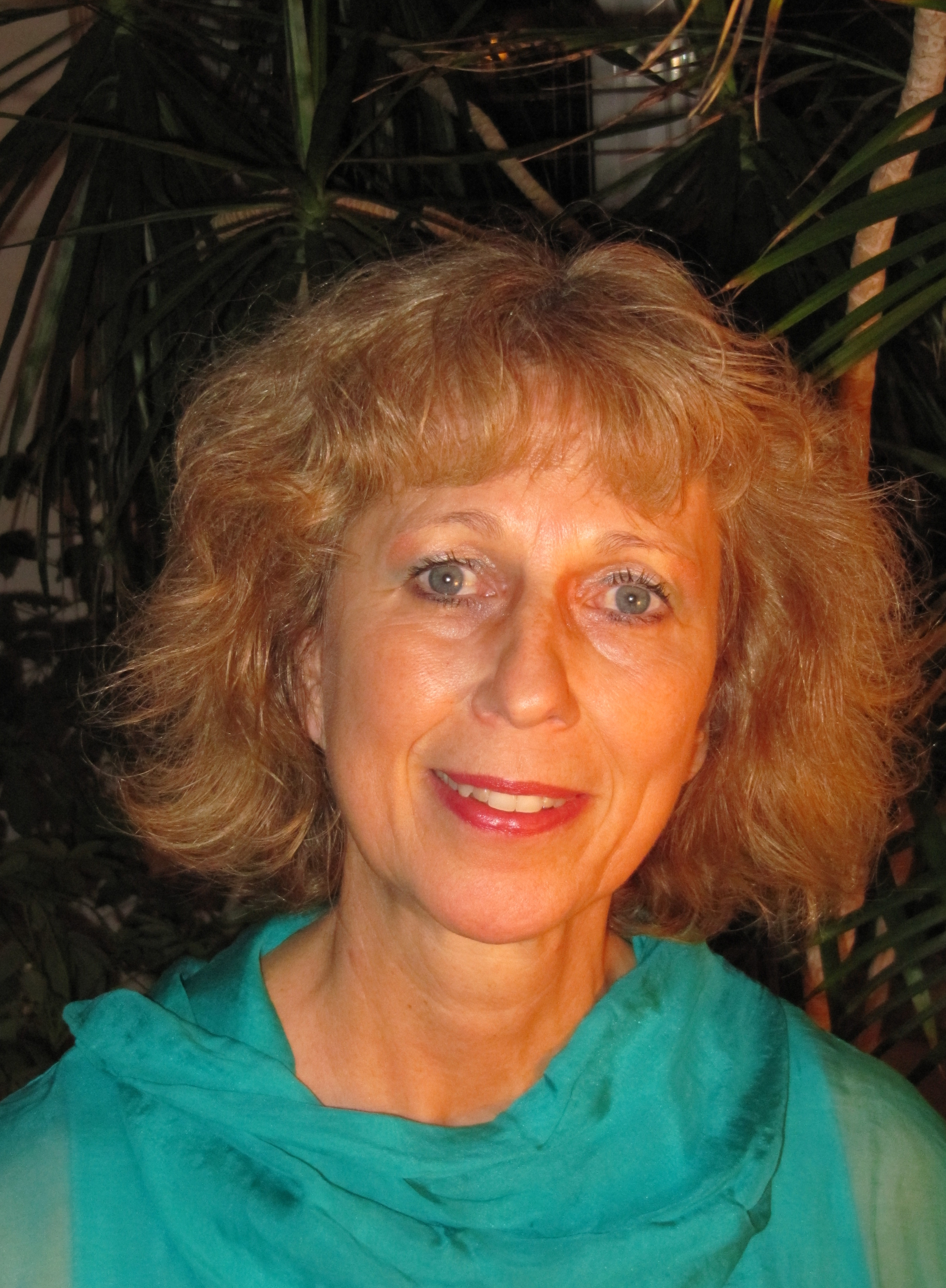
- Joëlle Morosoli
- Born: 1951 (age 74–75); Strasbourg, France
- Education: Université Laval, Paris 8 University
- Known for: Sculptor
- Movement: Kinetic art
- Patrons: Edmond Couchot

Joëlle Morosoli (born 1951) is a French-Canadian sculptor of French and Swiss descent. Her work takes the form either of installations or of architecturally integrated art in public buildings. Most of her works have moving parts, driven by mechanical systems.

== Biography ==
Born of a French mother, Gisèle Talbot, and a Swiss father, Erwin Morosoli, Joëlle immigrated to Quebec with her family in 1961.

Morosoli completed a bachelor's degree in visual arts at Laval University in Quebec City in 1975. In 1997, she moved to Paris where she undertook doctoral studies at Paris 8 University. On her return to Quebec, she took part in numerous group and solo exhibitions. Many of her projects are produced as part of the government's policy of integrating art into architecture.

In 2004, Joëlle married Rolf Morosoli in Montreal, where she lives. She has taught at Cégep de Saint-Laurent (college) since 1998.

== Artistic approach ==
Morosoli began using movement as a kind of material very early in her career. Her sculptures "stylize certain movements observed in plant, animal and aquatic worlds... to express the world of the subconscious, wherein threatening emotional energies lie buried..."

Whereas movement in kinetic sculptures like mobiles often originates from a natural source, such as wind or water, Morosoli equips each sculpture or installational element with a small motor that generates an even, often barely perceptible rhythmical motion. These movements will suddenly reveal new colours or forms, and sometimes reconfigure the entire work. Spectators move freely through the installations, witnessing the changes, while the slowness of the transformation creates a state of tension, of discovery and expectancy.

Her architecturally-integrated work conjures natural forms and movement. The breadth of the movements, the rhythms, and the resulting changes in form and colour manage to suggest a range of emotions.

== Main works ==
Joëlle Morosoli has presented more than thirty solo exhibitions throughout Canada and Quebec. She was also invited to take part in major group exhibitions at such venues as the Centre Georges Pompidou and the Chartreuse de Villeneuve-lès-Avignon. In 2002, she was selected to represent Quebec at ArtCanal, part of Expo.02 in Switzerland.

She has more than twenty public artworks to her credit, including the Palais des Congrès in Gatineau, Centre Mère-Enfant in Quebec City, and Centre d’hébergement Roland-Leclerc in Trois-Rivières.

Morosoli is also a writer. Her first novel, Le sablier de l'angoisse, won second prize for the 1986 Prix Robert-Cliche. She also published Le ressac des ombres, in 1988, and a collection of poetry Traînée rouge dans un soleil de lait in 1984.

She co-founded the art journal Espace, for which she was assistant editor from 1987 to 1997. She teaches visual art at Cégep de Saint-Laurent where she also coordinates the visual arts and art history department.

== Gallery ==
=== Installations ===
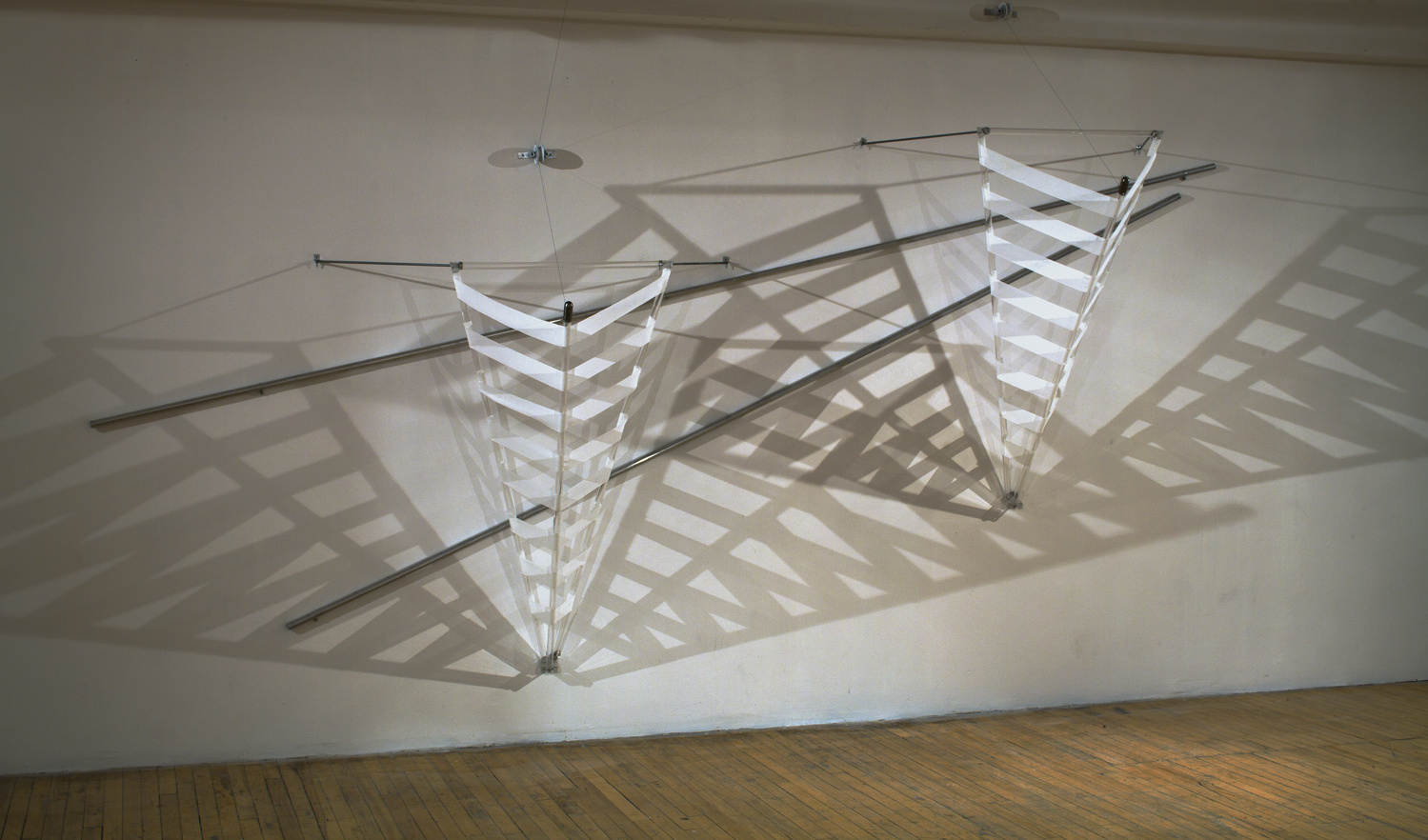
Ombres sous tension, Circa, Montréal, 2011

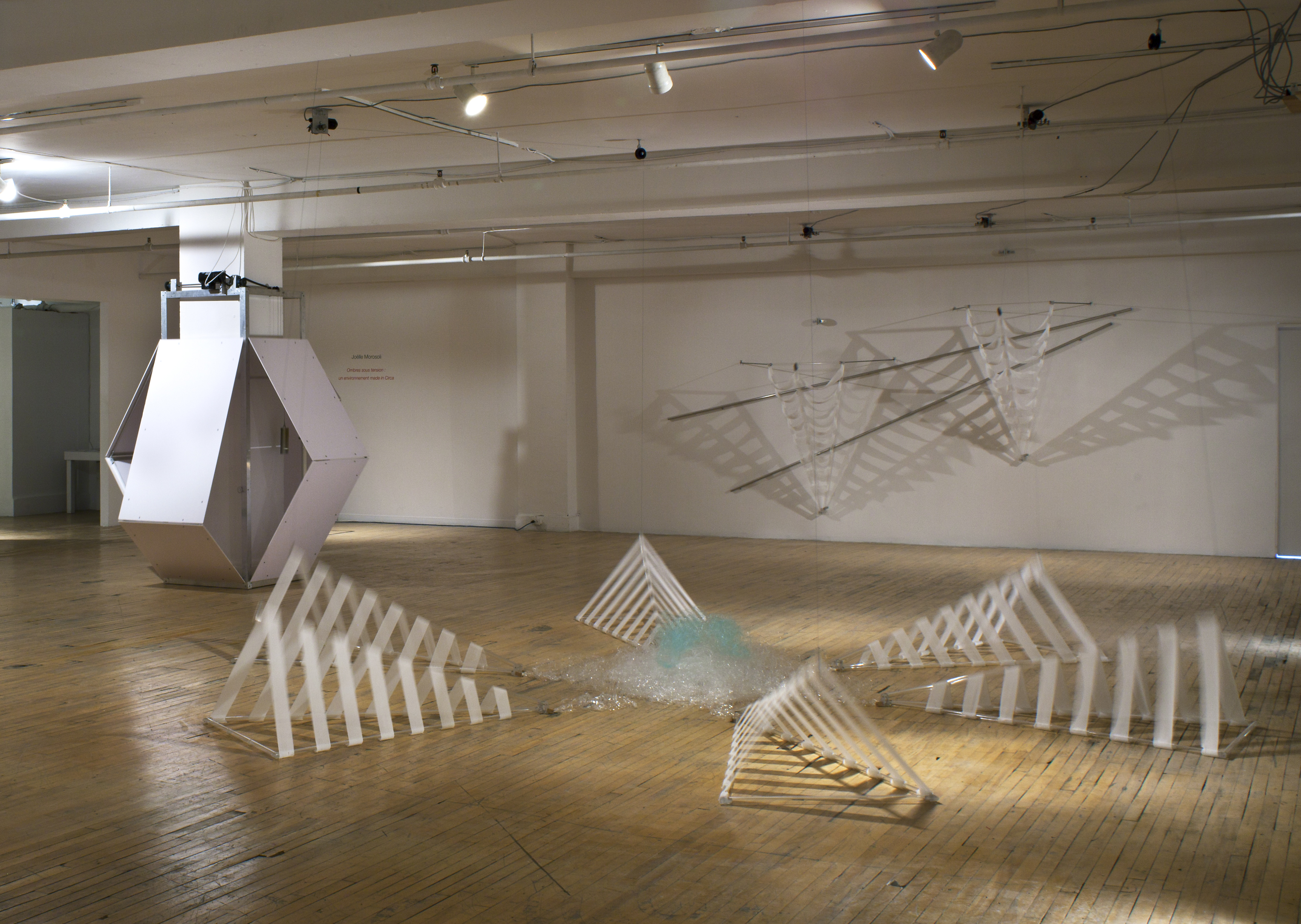
Ombres sous tension, Circa, Montréal, 2011

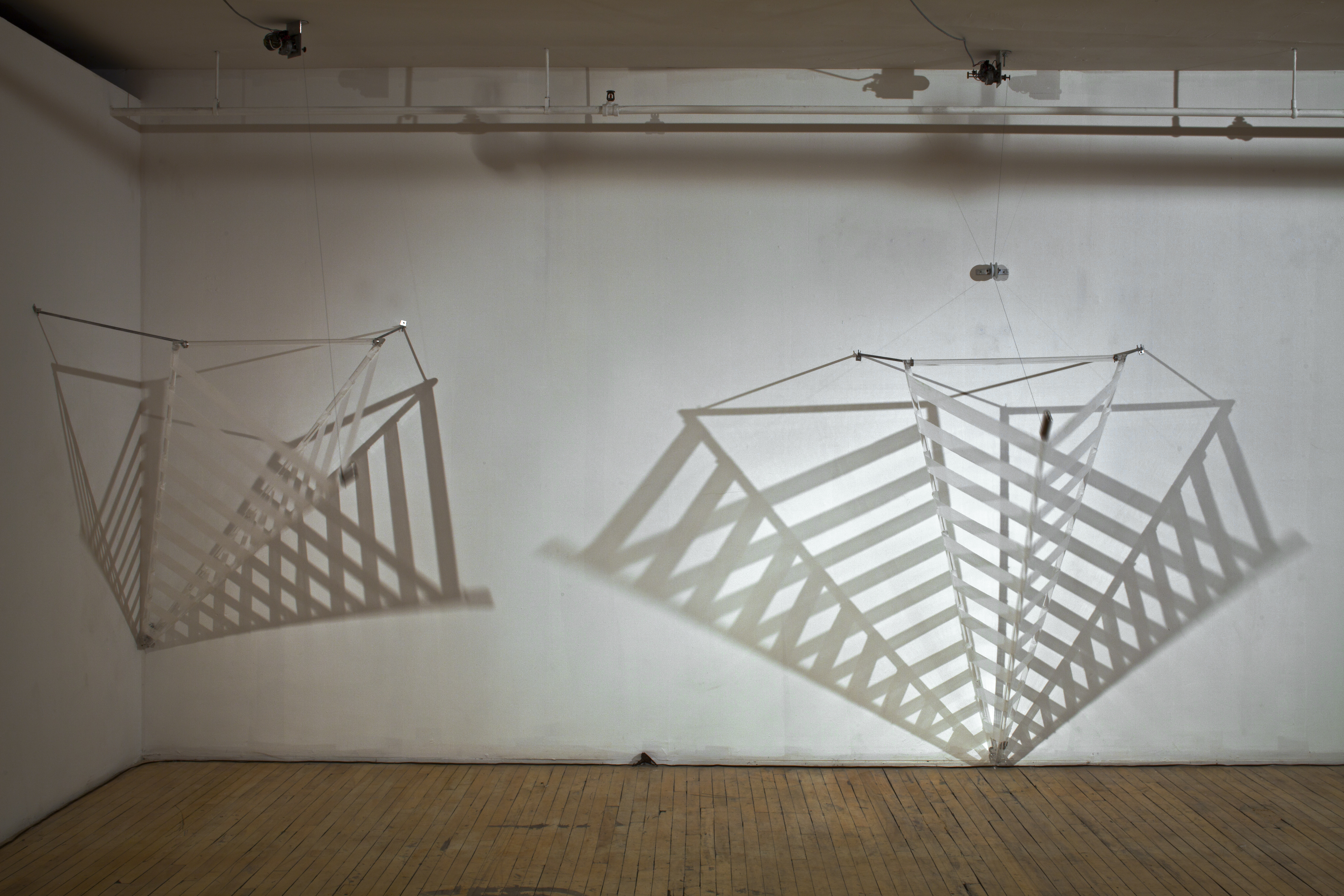
Ombres sous tension, Circa, Montréal, 2011

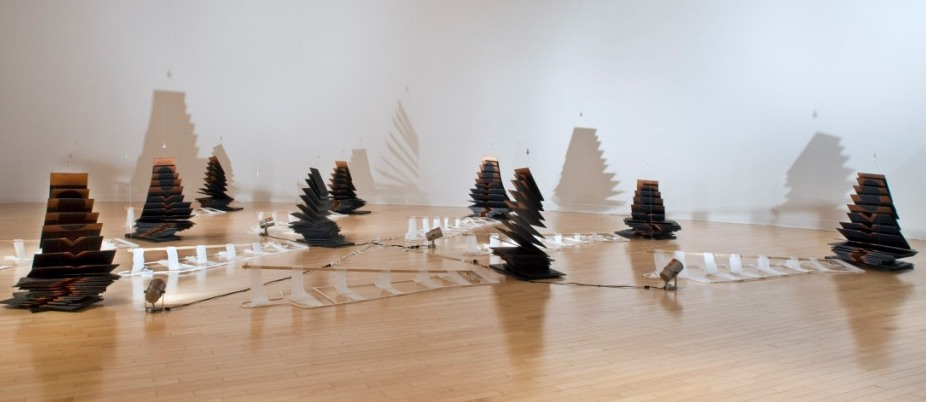
Camaïeu d'ombres, Galerie d'art d'Outremont, Montréal, 2009

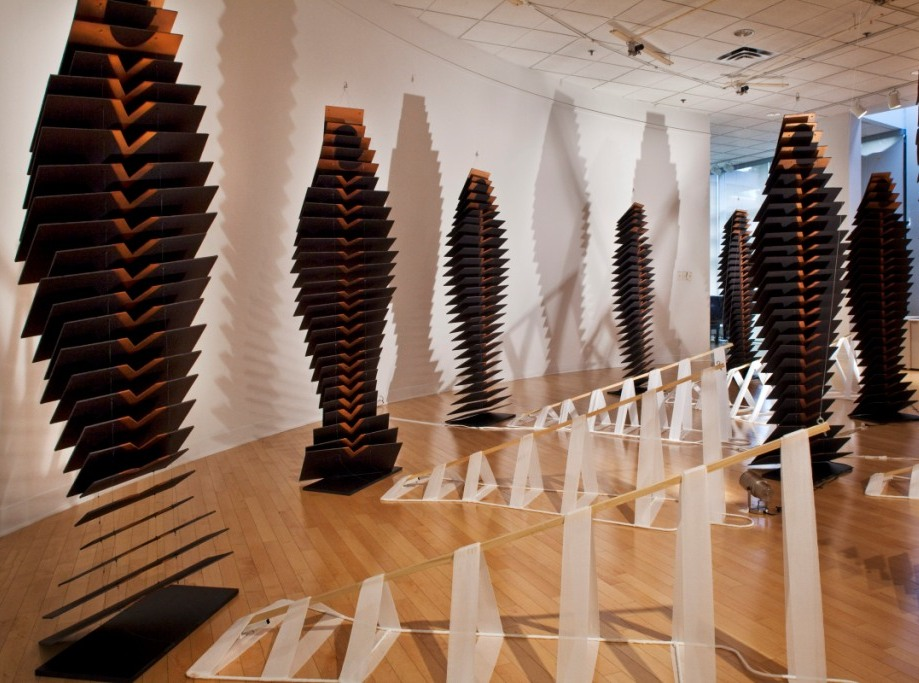
Camaïeu d'ombres, Galerie d'art d'Outremont, Montréal, 2009

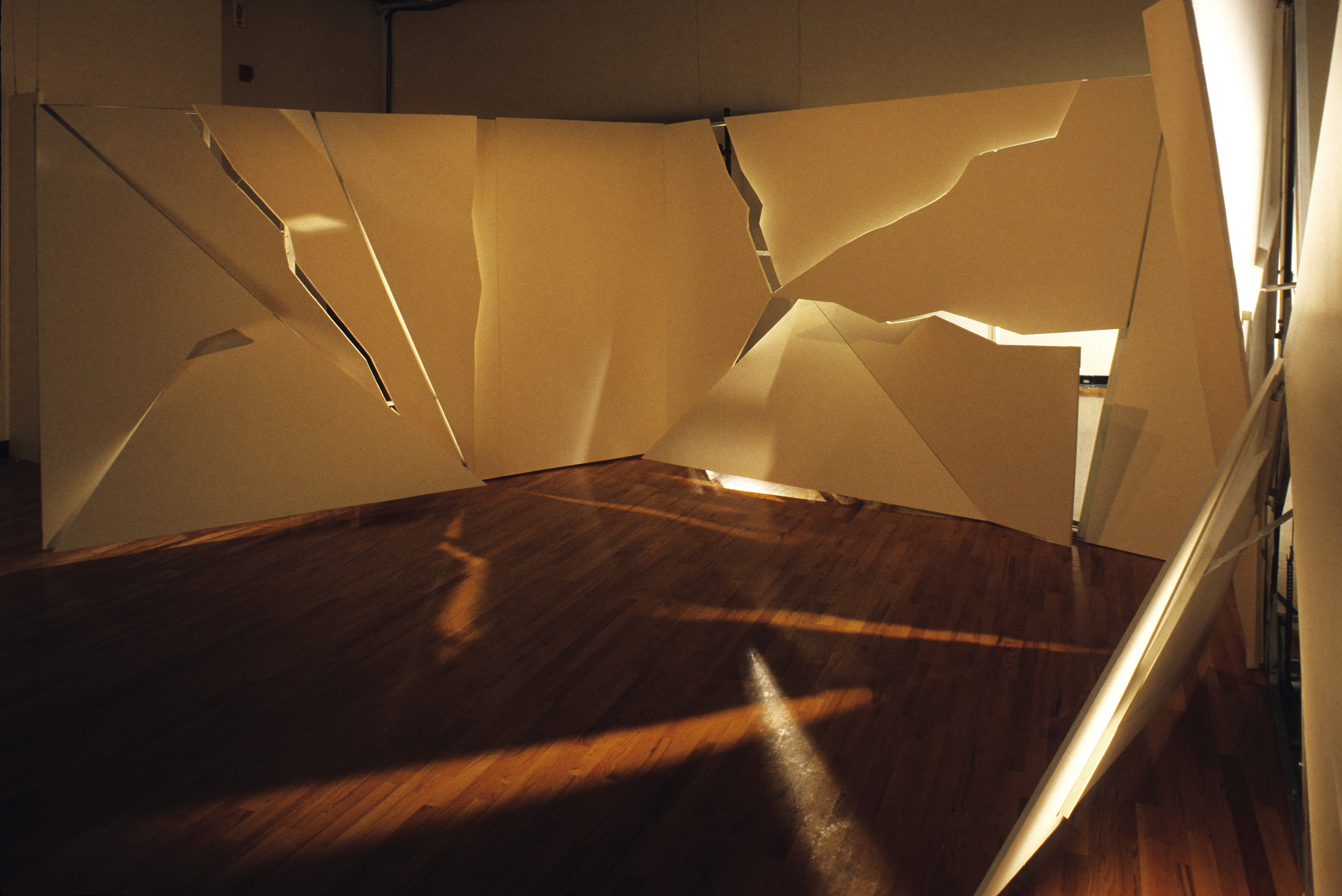
Lézardes, Musée d'art contemporain des Laurentides, Saint-Jérôme, 2002

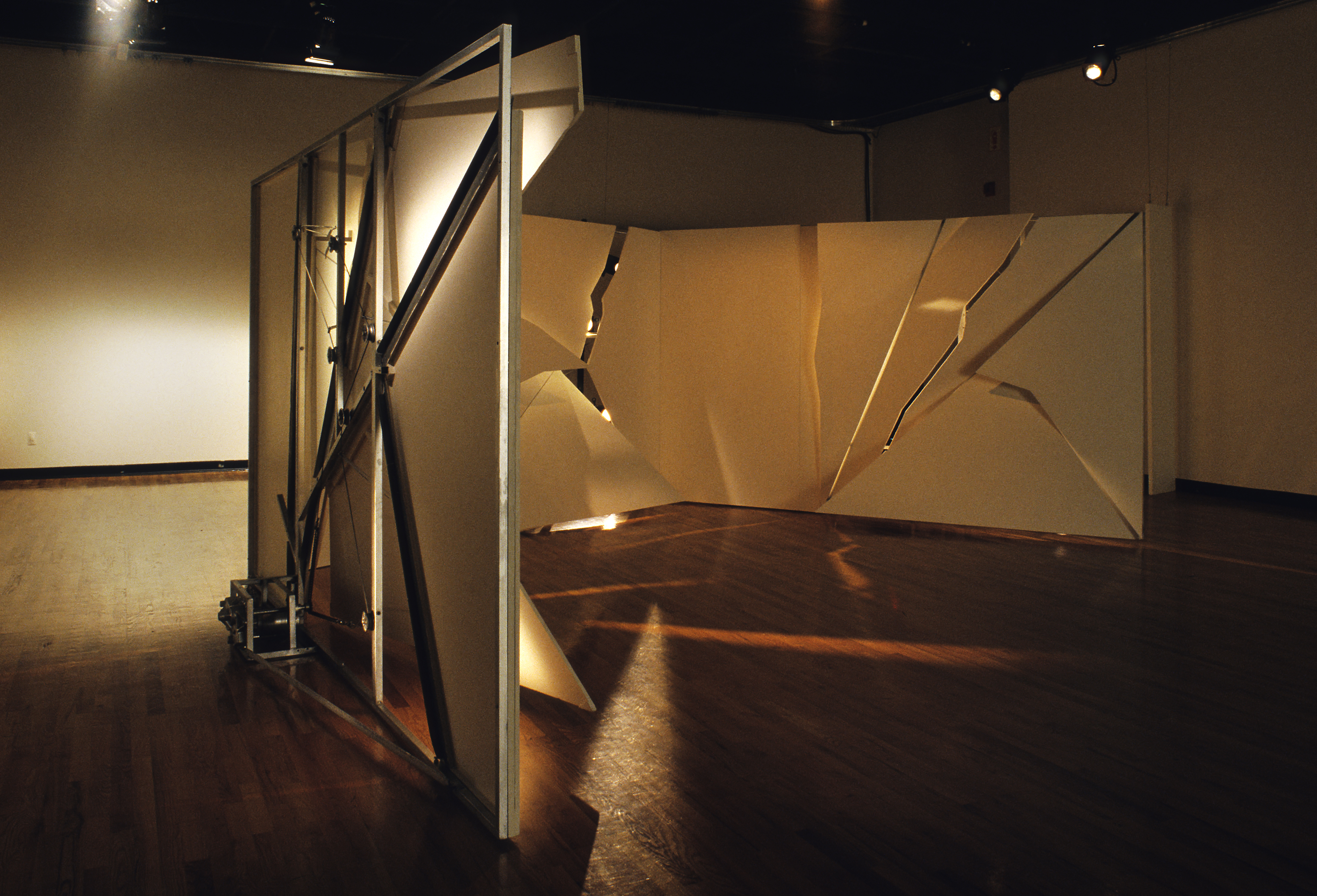
Lézardes, Musée d'art contemporain des Laurentides, Saint-Jérôme, 2002

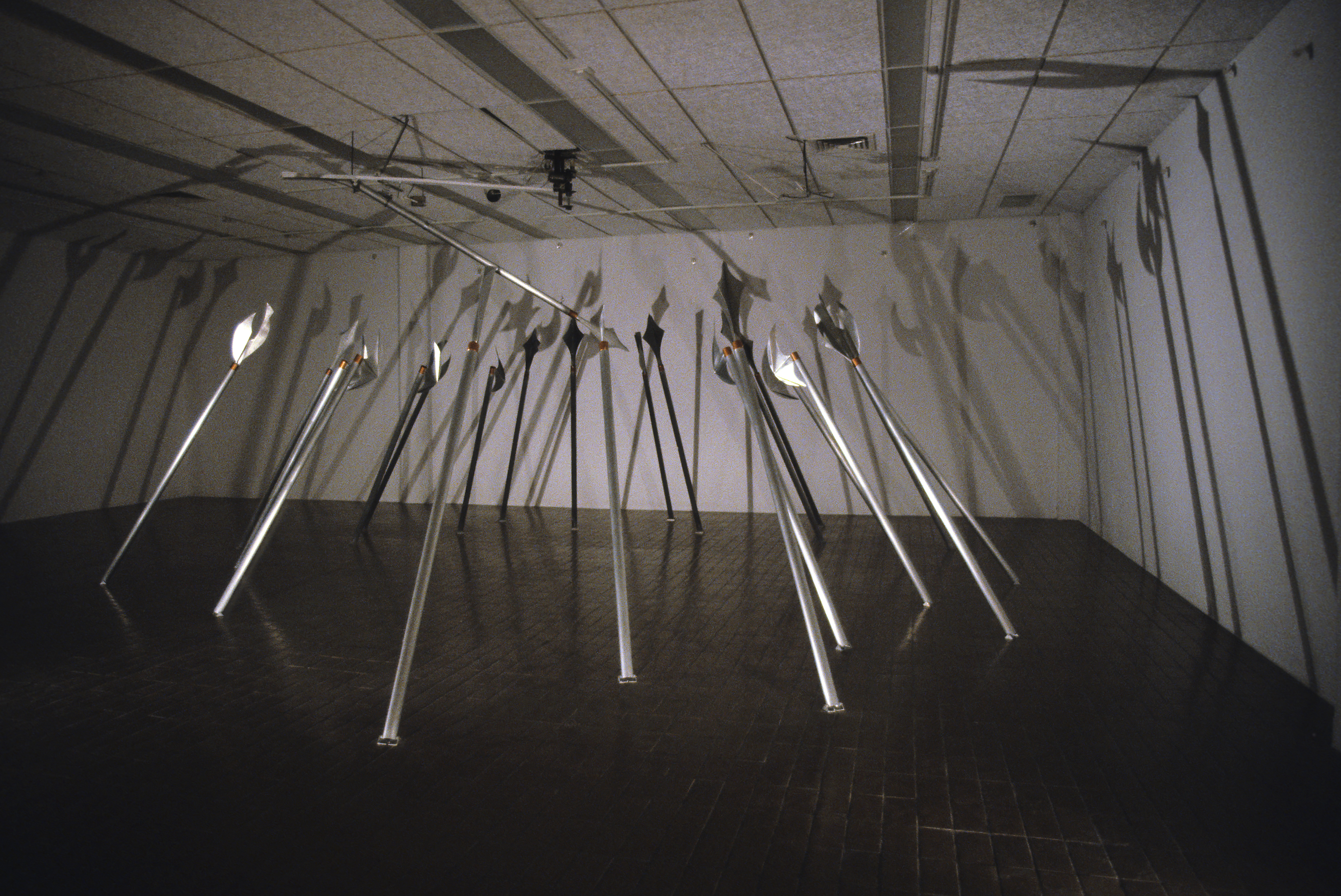
Violence virtuelle, The New Gallery, Calgary, 1999

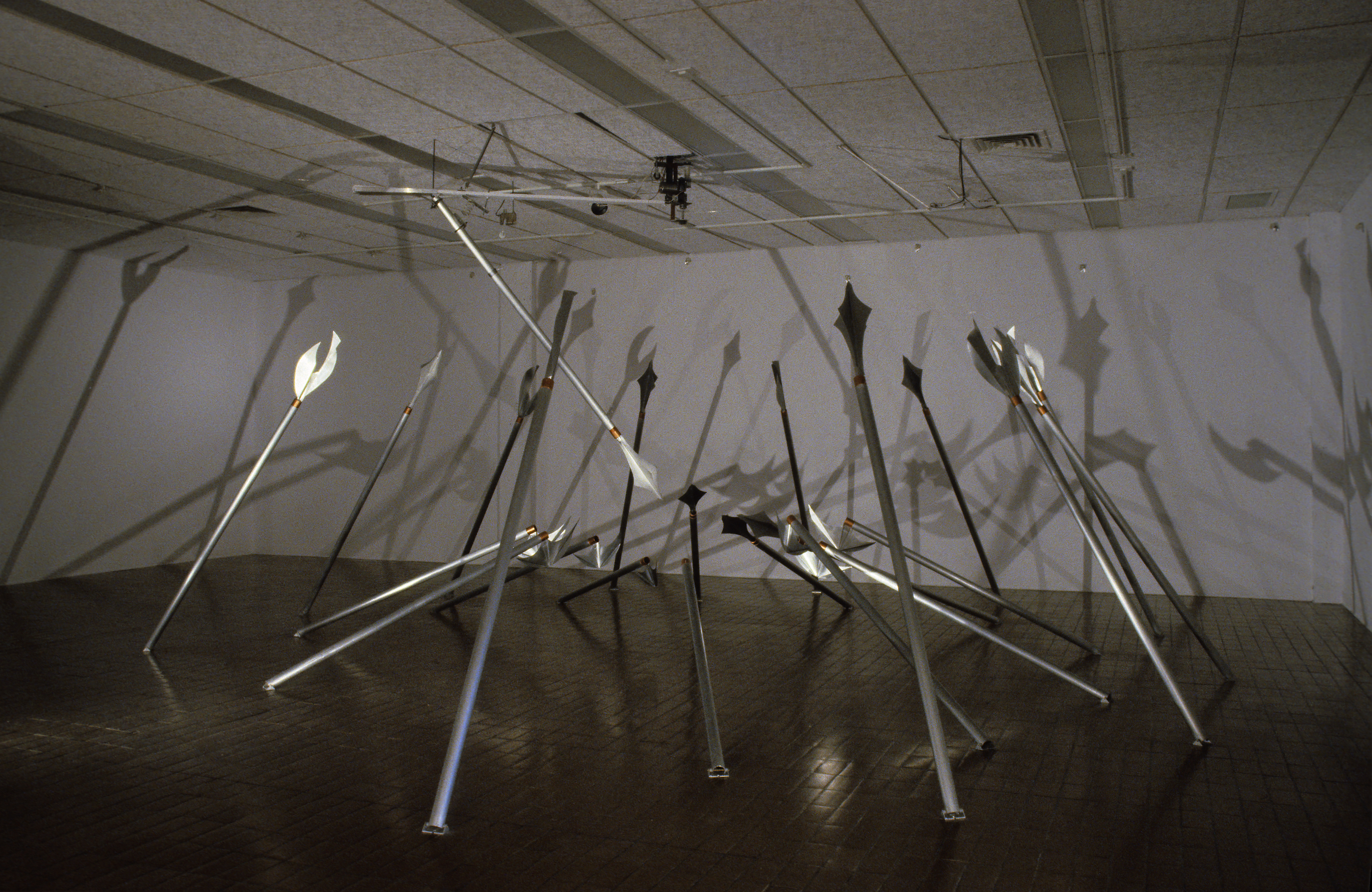
Violence virtuelle, The New Gallery, Calgary, 1999

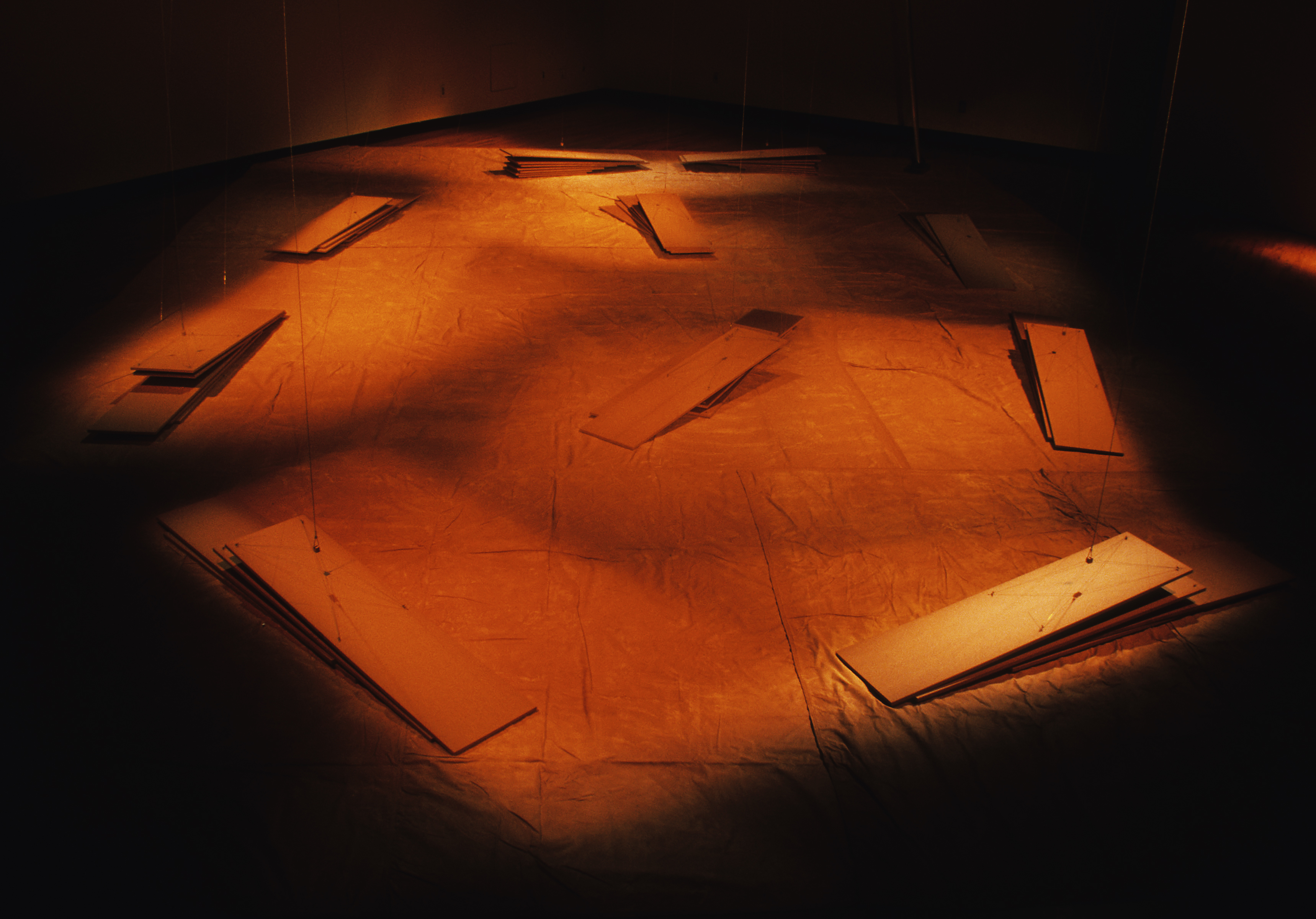
Cité engloutie, A SPACE Gallery, Toronto, 1995

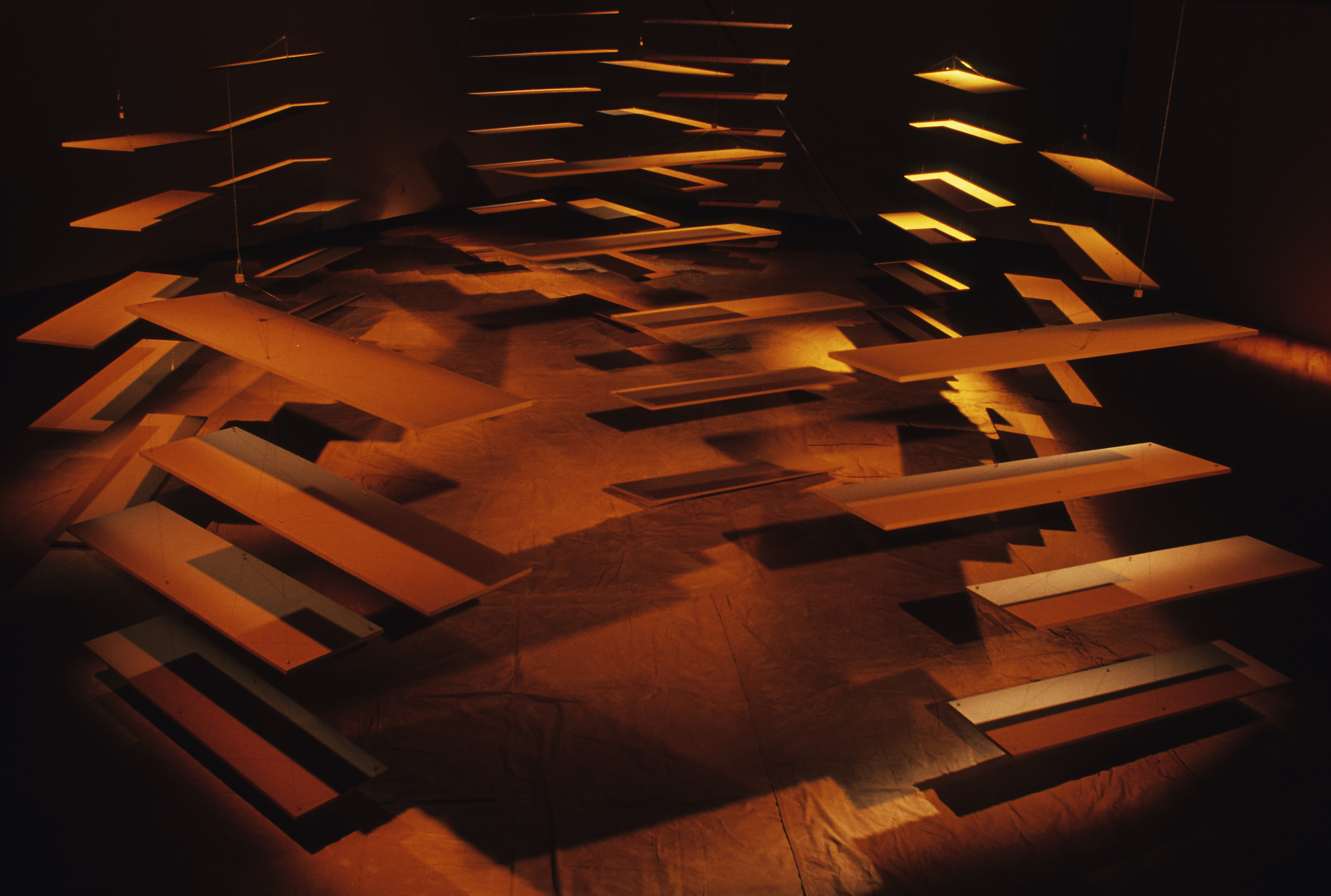
Cité engloutie, A SPACE Gallery, Toronto, 1995

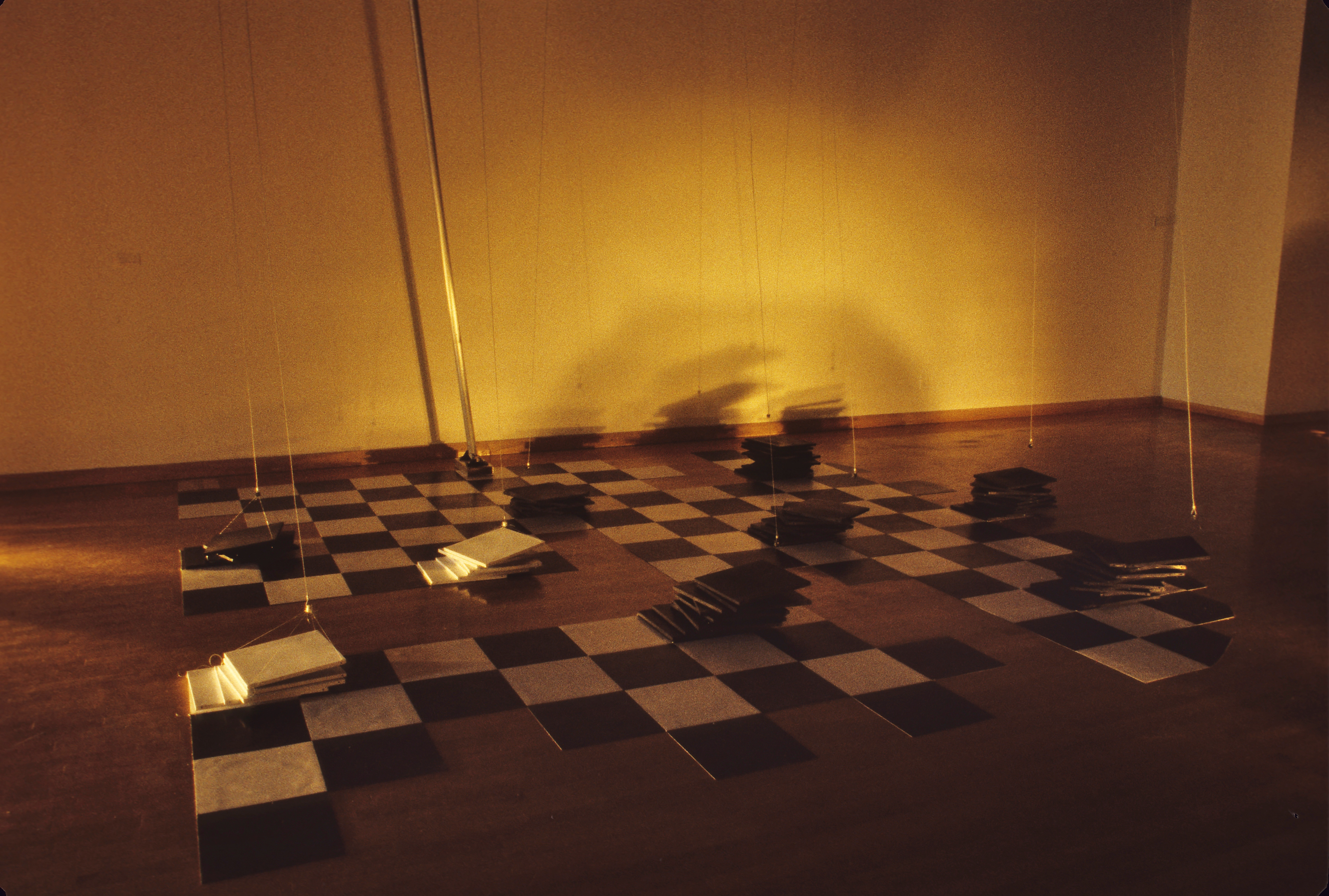
Non-Lieu, Maison de la culture Côte-des-Neiges, Montréal, 1993

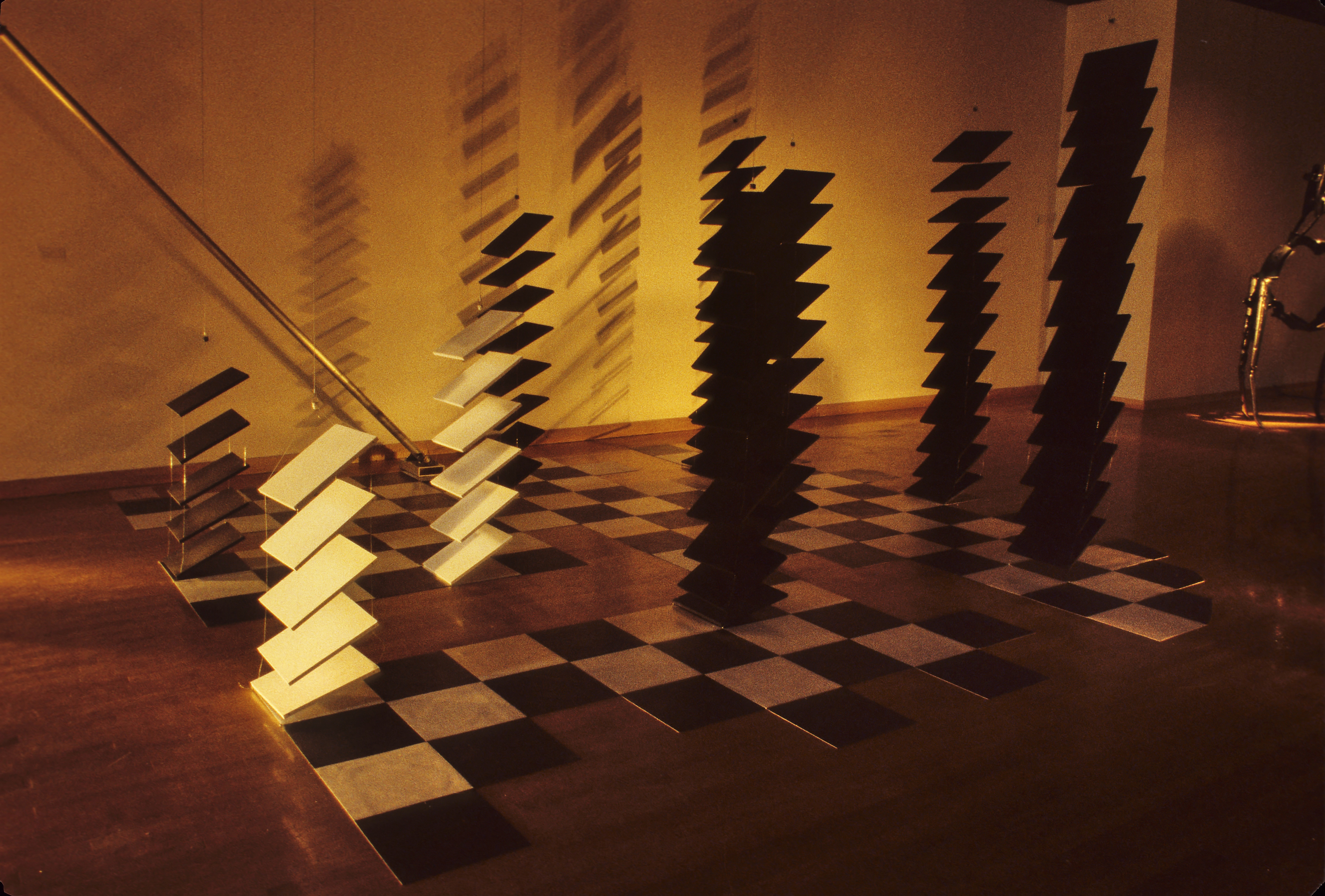
Non-Lieu, Maison de la culture Côte-des-Neiges, Montréal, 1993

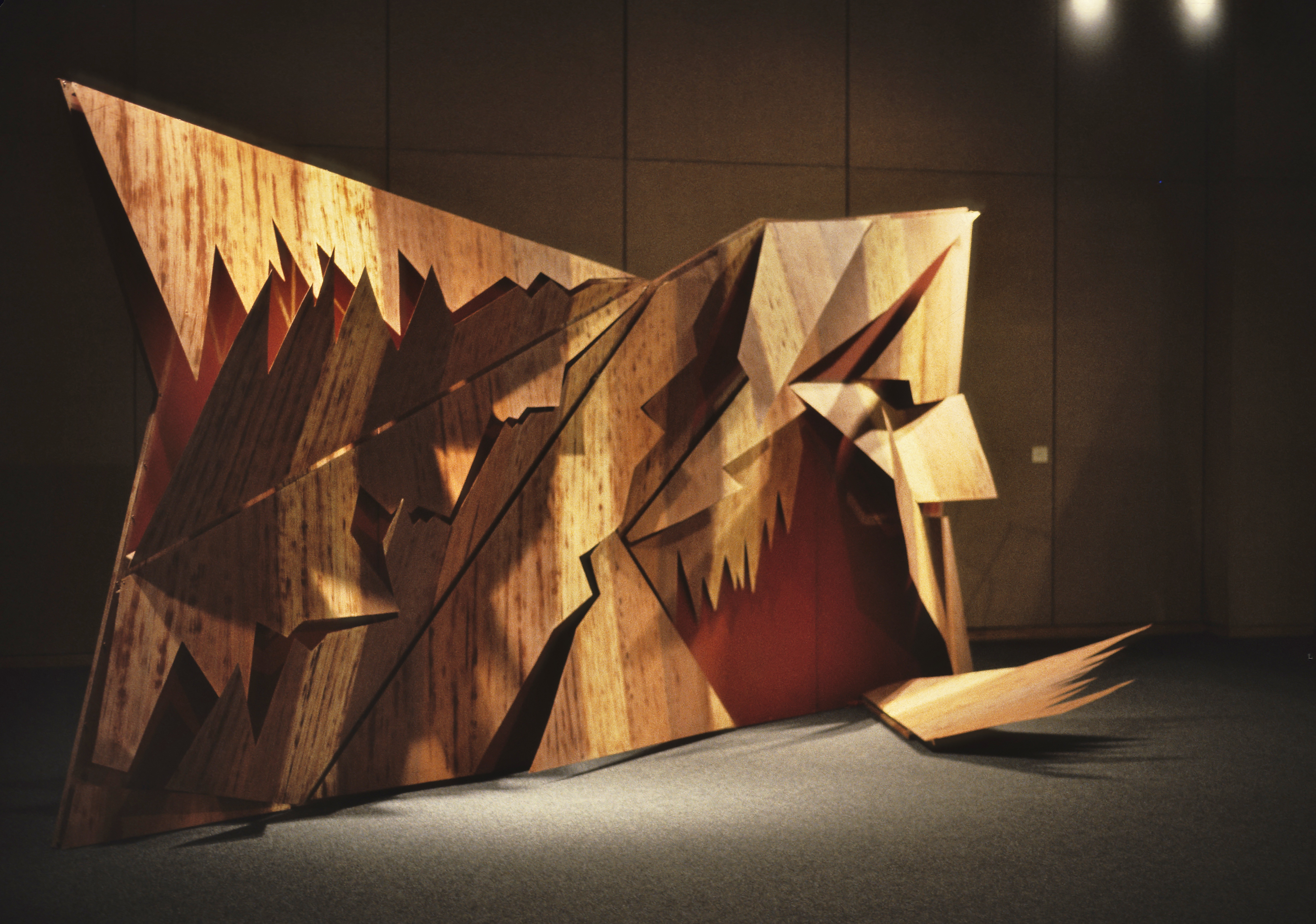
Déchirure, Galerie d'art Lavalin, Montréal, 1989

=== Public art ===
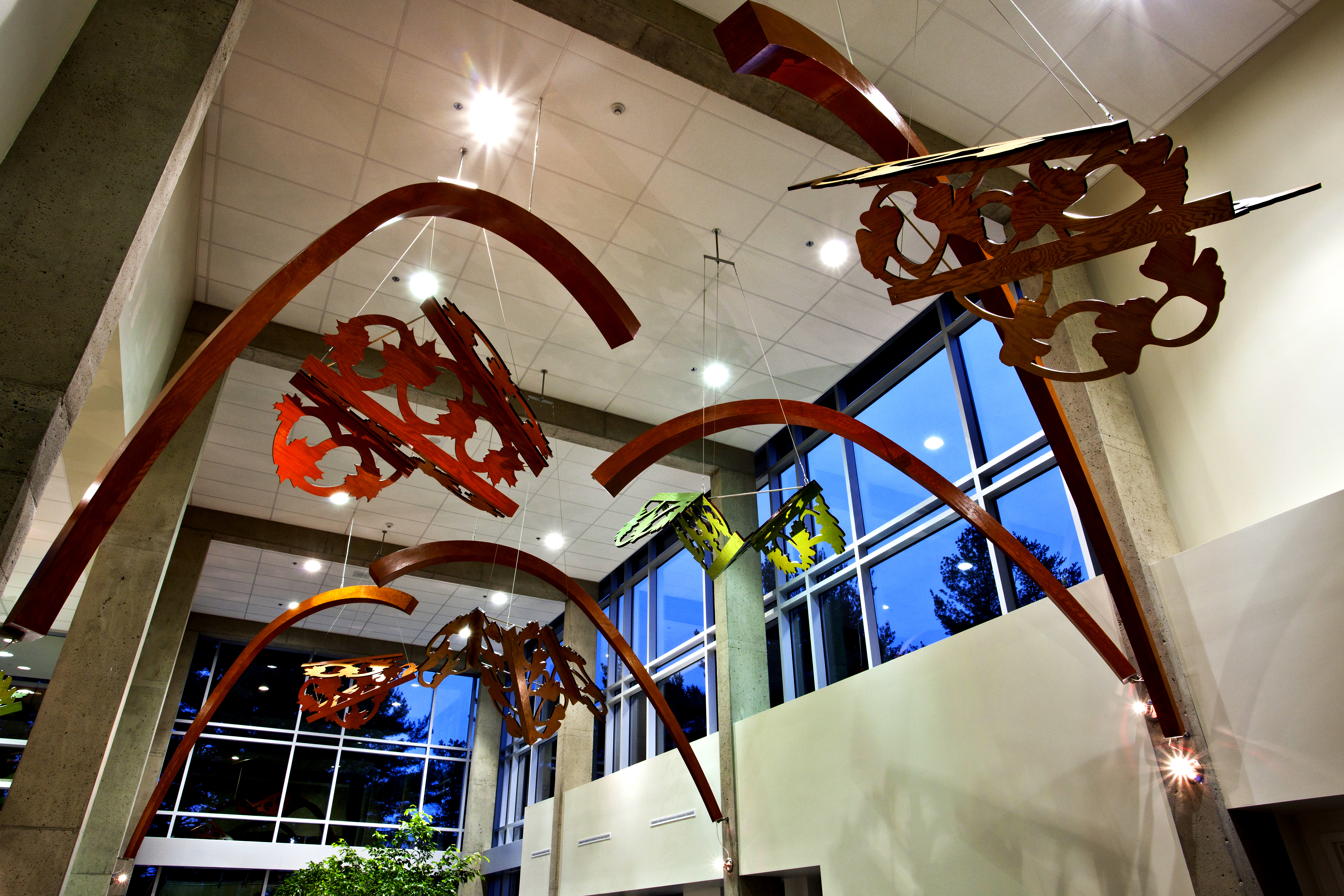
Cathédrale de verdure, Centre d'hébergement Roland-Leclerc, Trois-Rivières, 2011

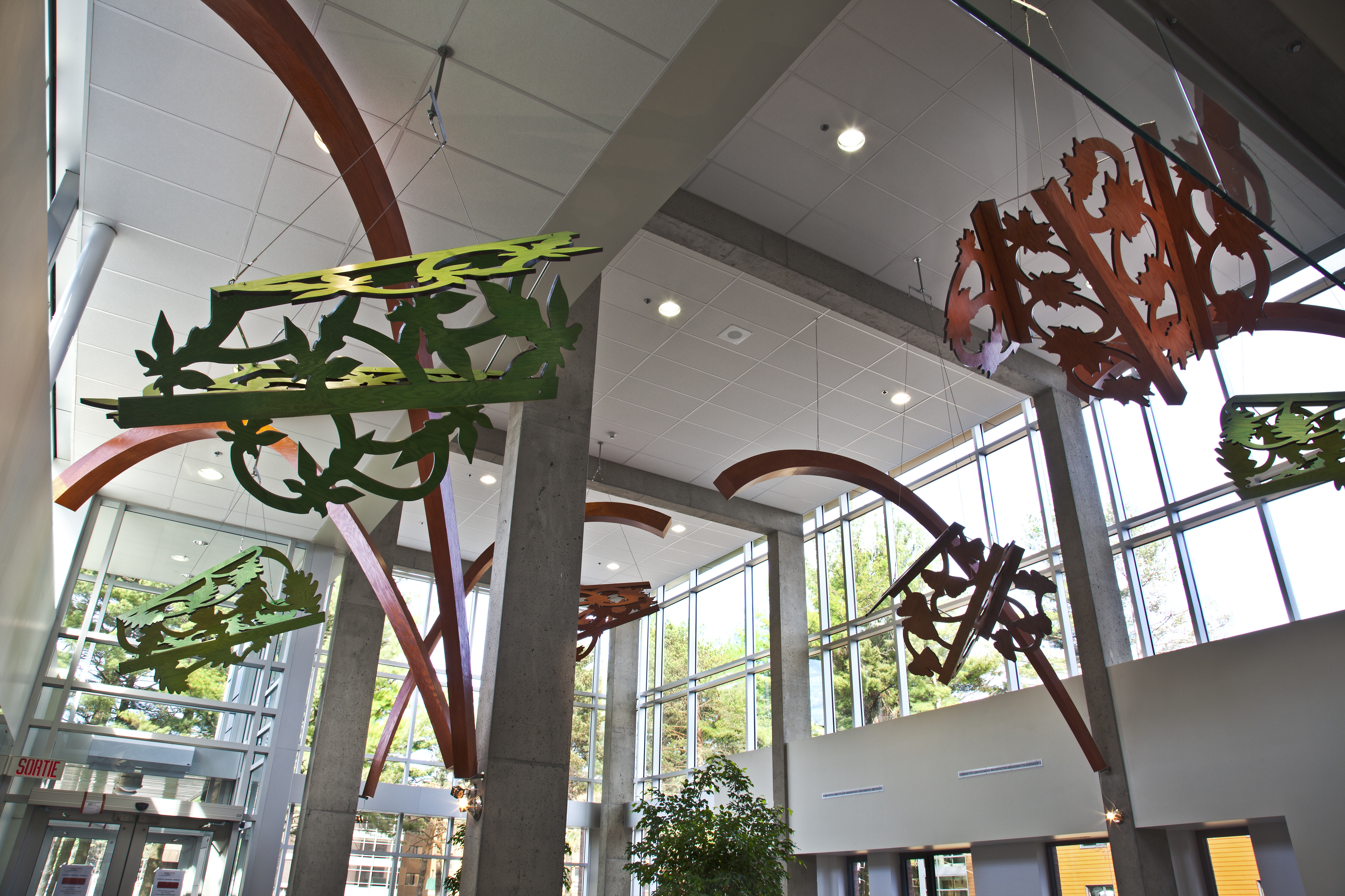
Cathédrale de verdure, Centre d'hébergement Roland-Leclerc, Trois-Rivières, 2011

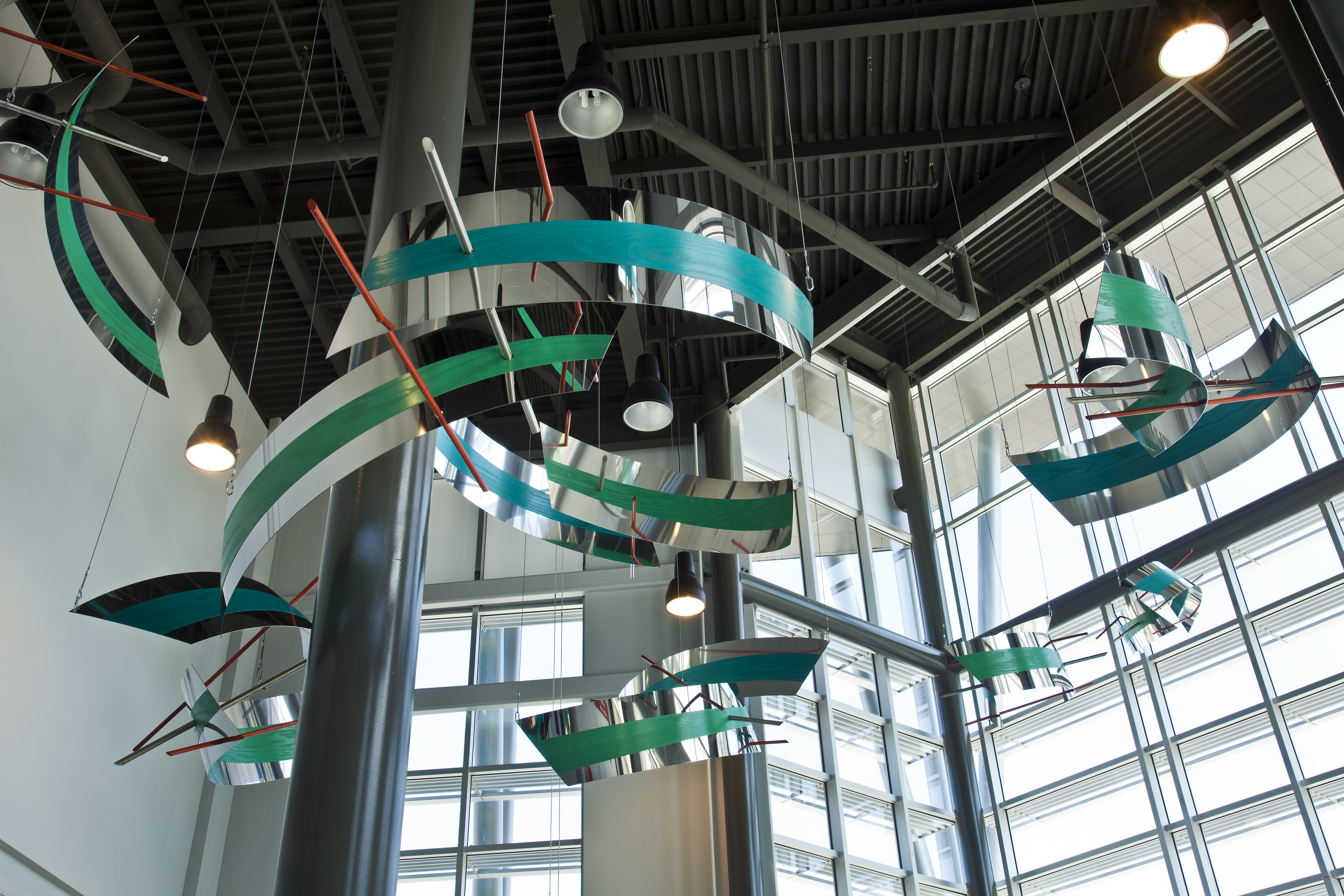
Vitesse en suspension, Aréna de Salaberry, Salaberry de Valleyfield, 2011

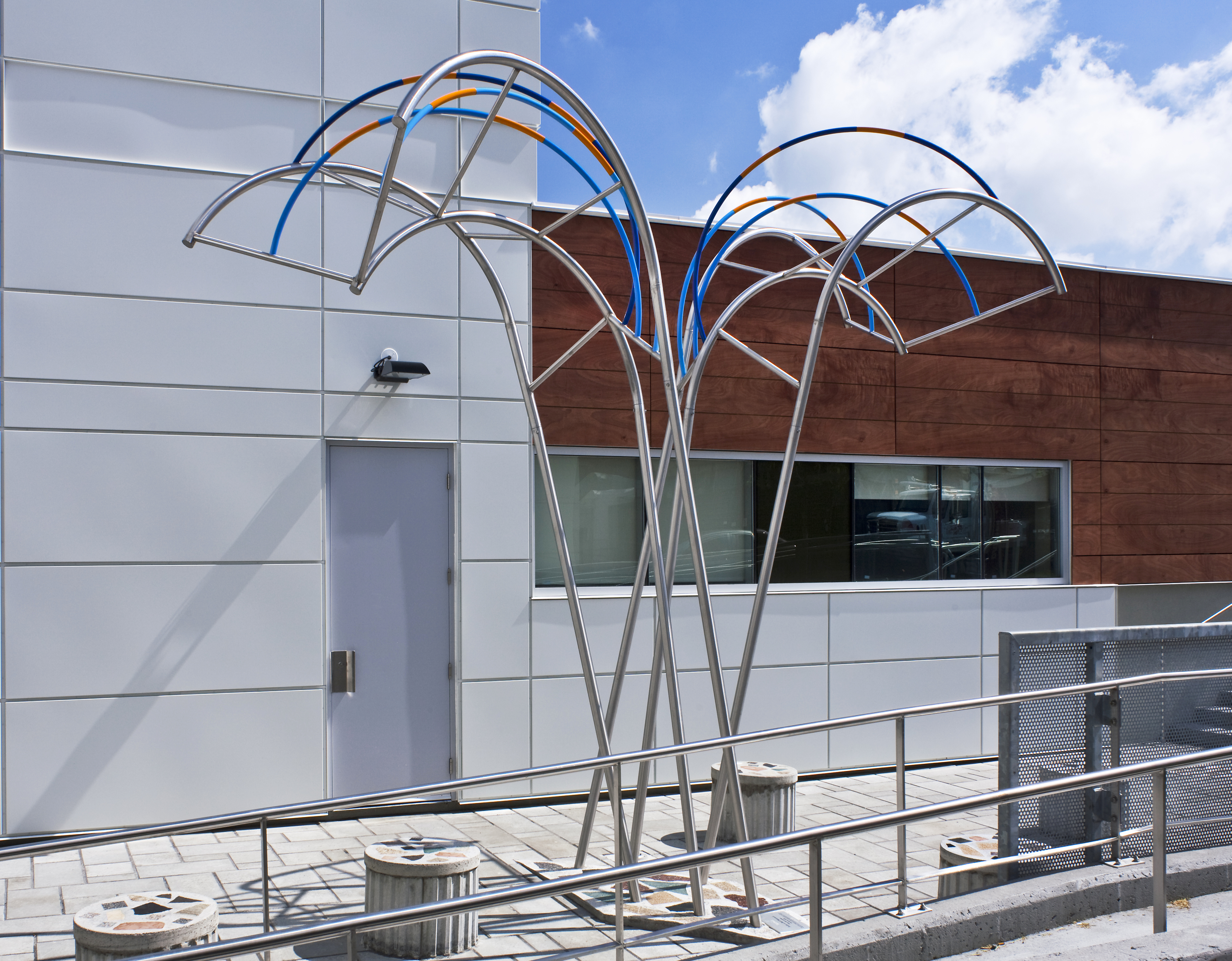
Sous les arches, Hôpital de Granby, Granby, 2009

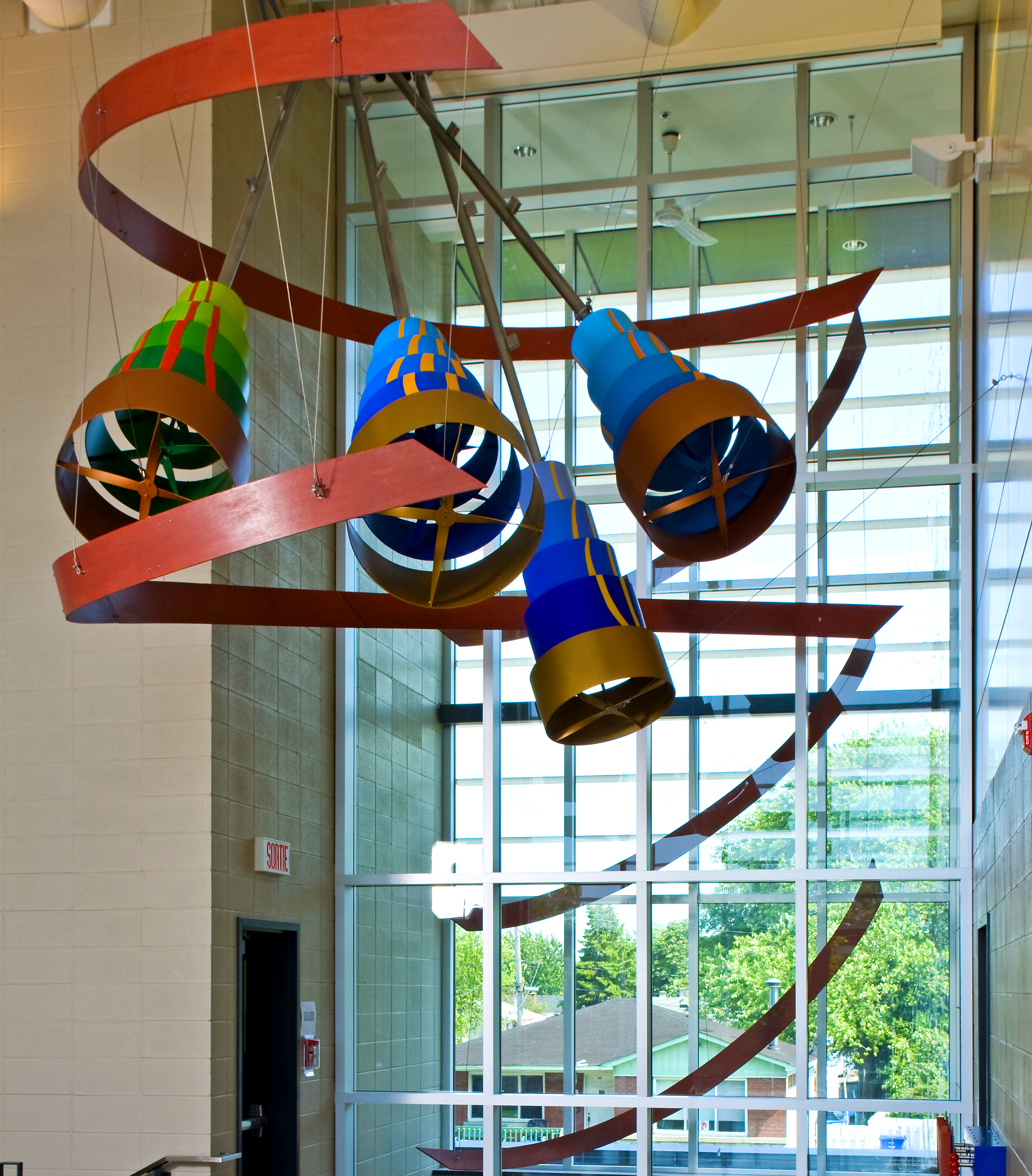
Impulsion, École régionale du Vent-Nouveau, Longueuil, 2008

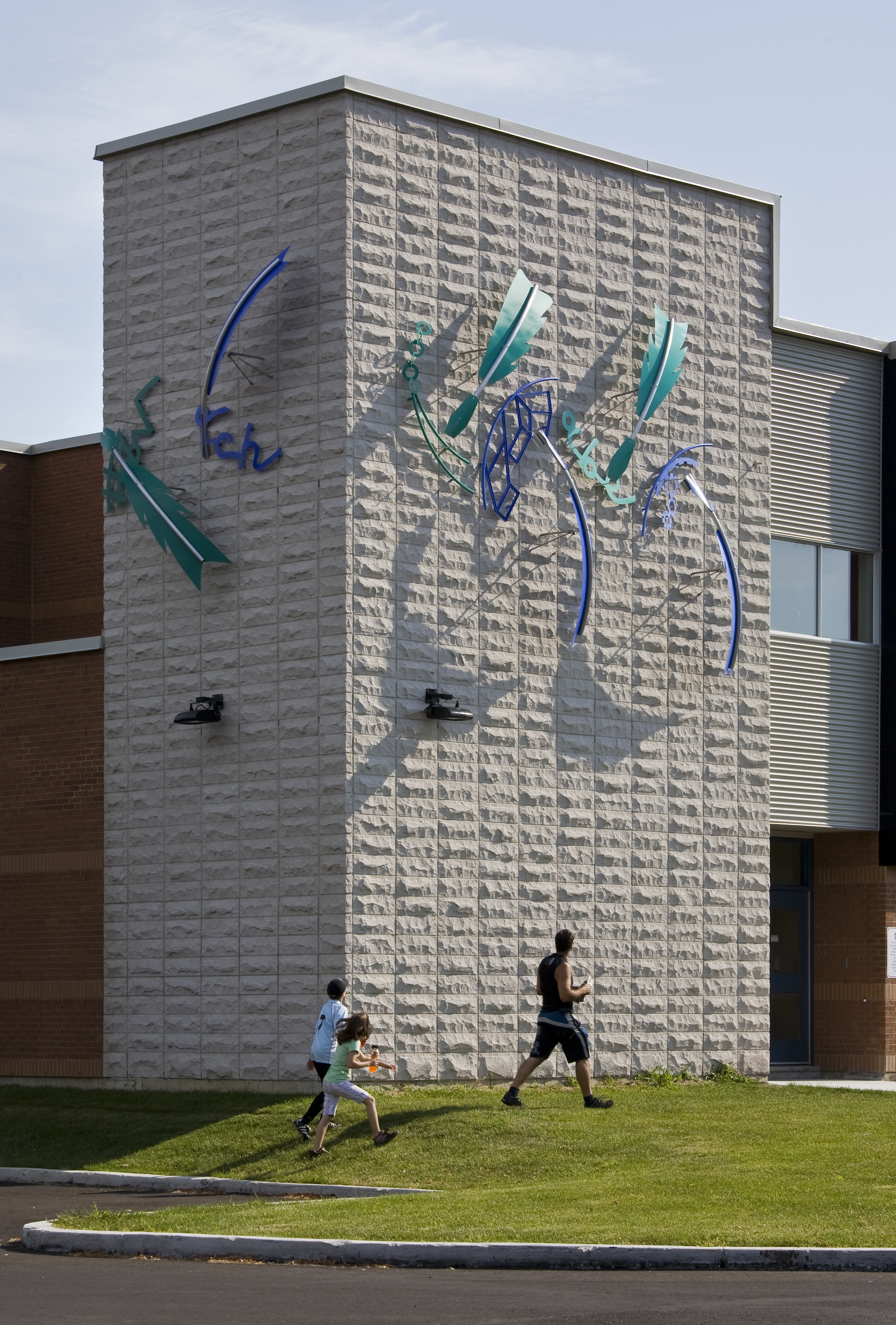
Le souffle de l'avenir, Centre de formation Nova, Châteauguay, 2008

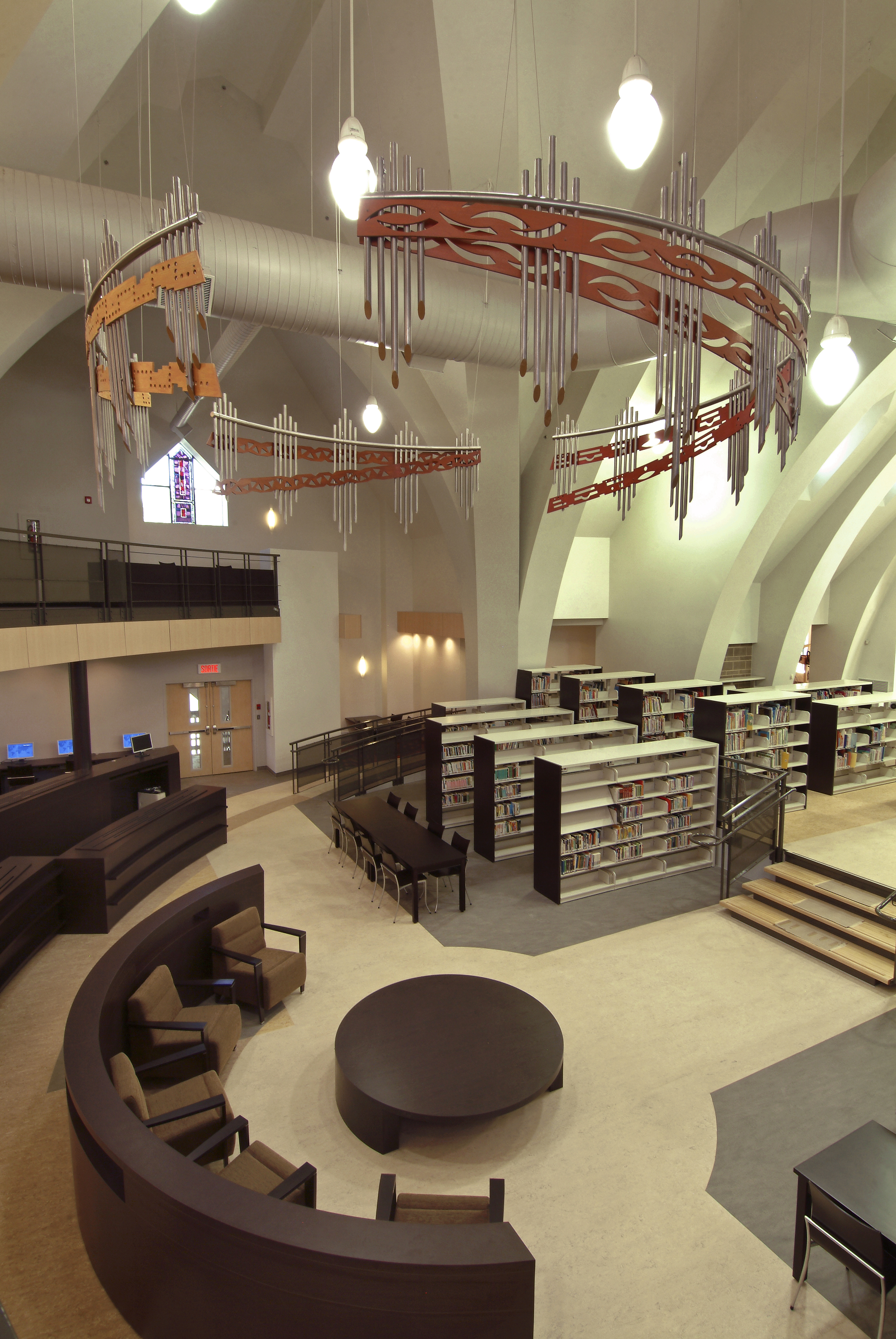
Entre partition et manuscrit, Bibliothèque Rina-Lasnier, Joliette, 2007

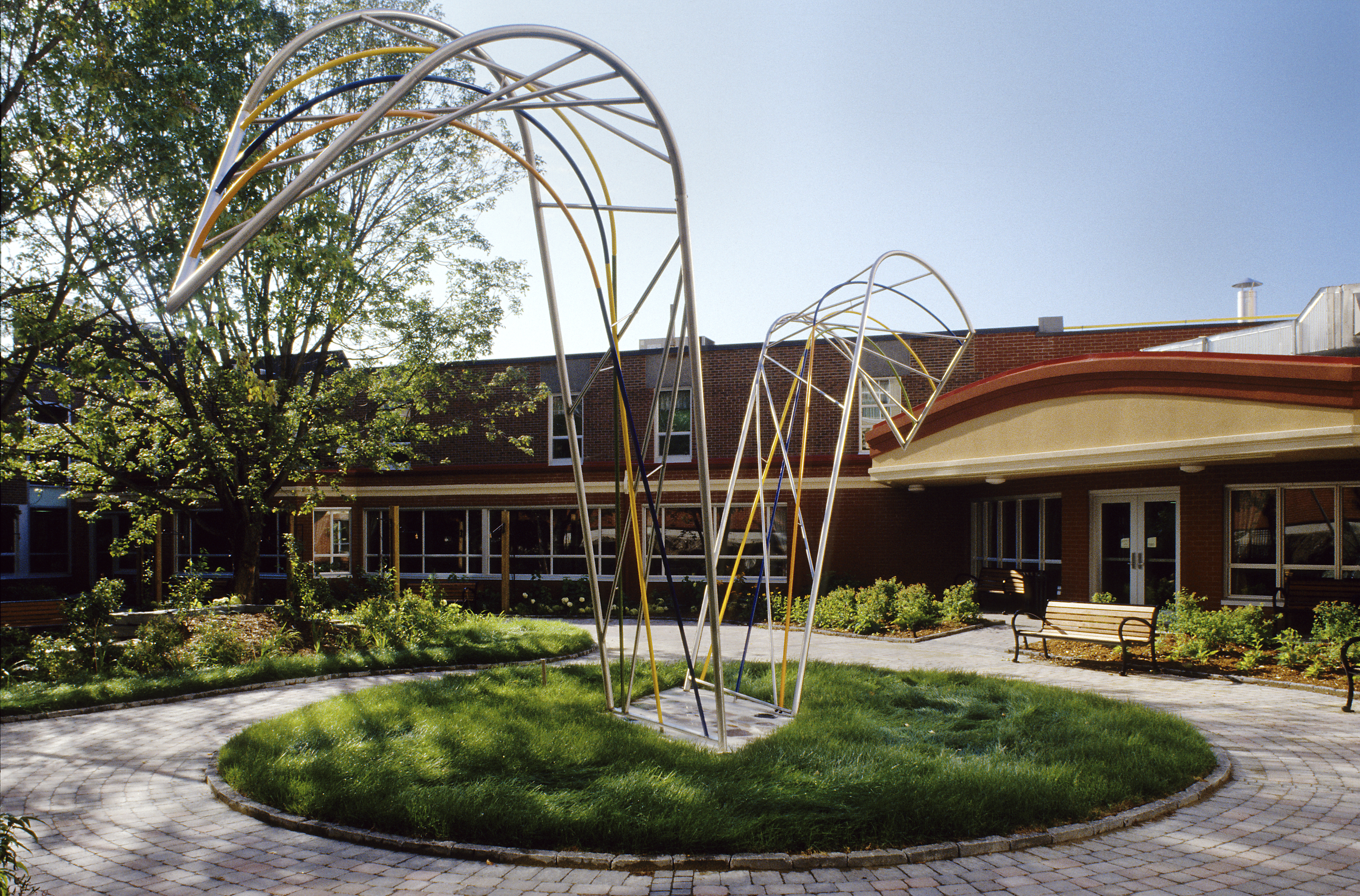
De la mémoire à l'envol, Centre d'hébergement Maison Pie XII, Rouyn-Noranda, 2006

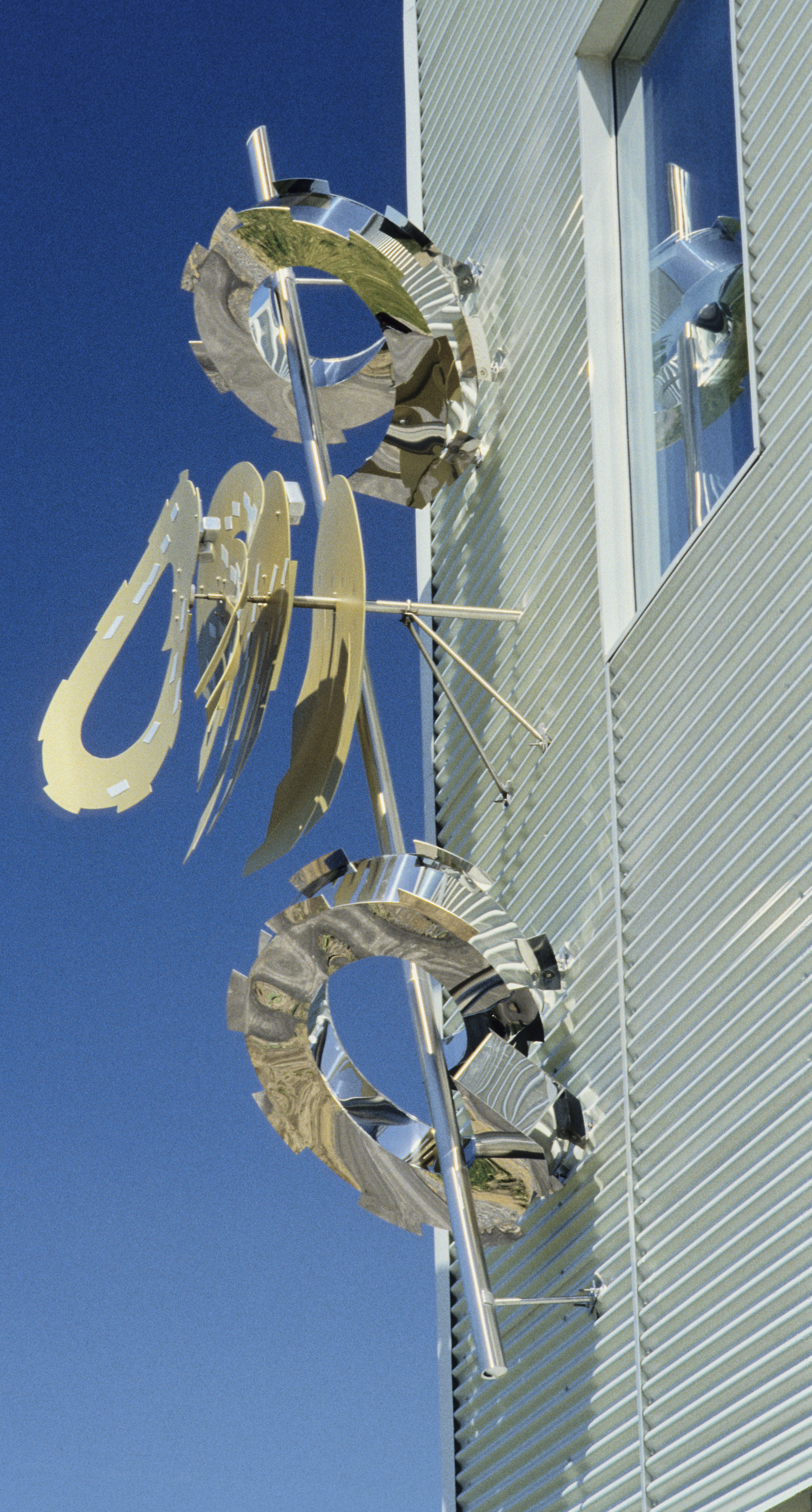
Spirale technologique, Centre de formation professionnelle de Lachine, Lachine, 2004

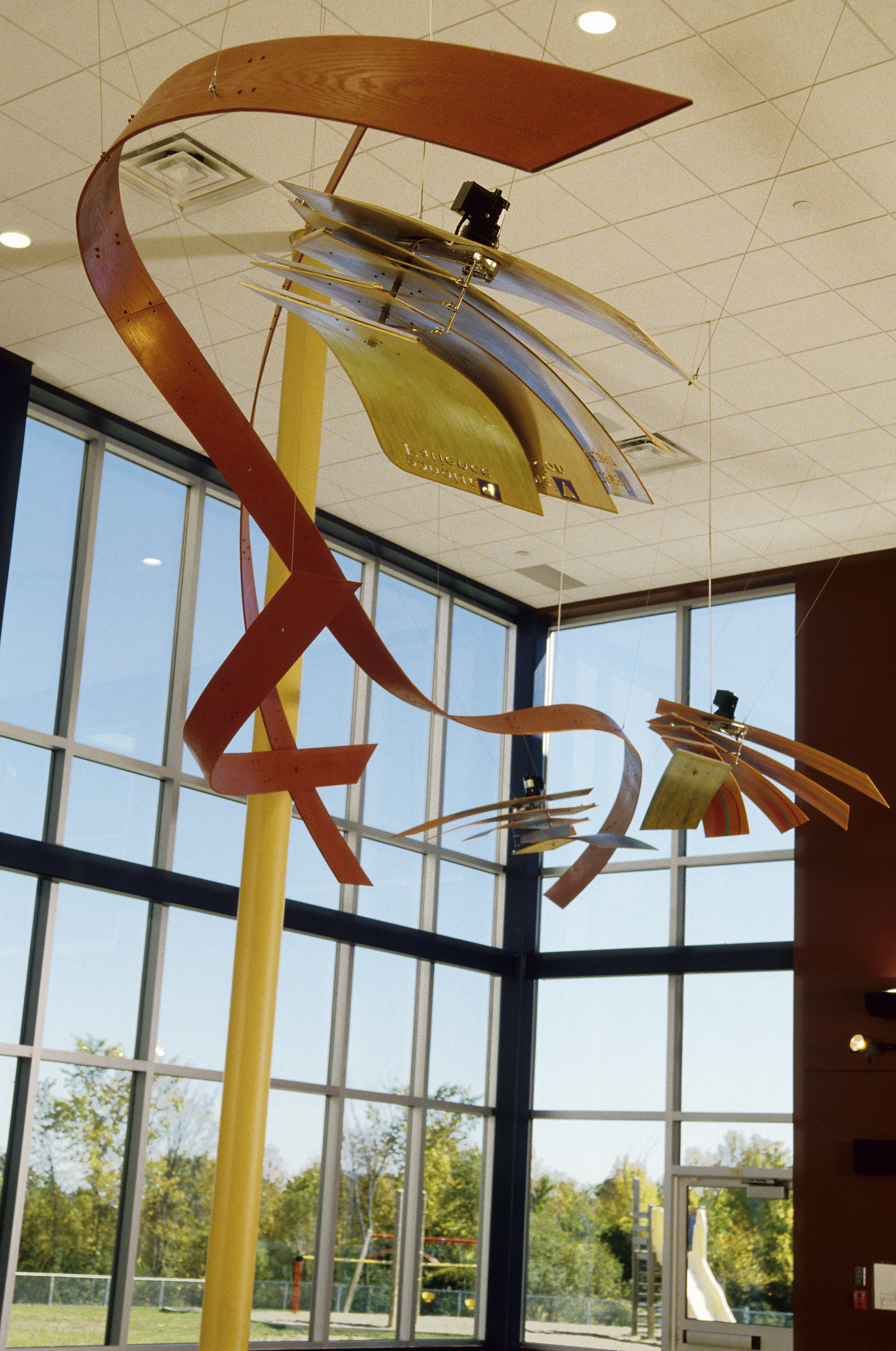
Intangible passage, École primaire Symmes, Gatineau, 2004

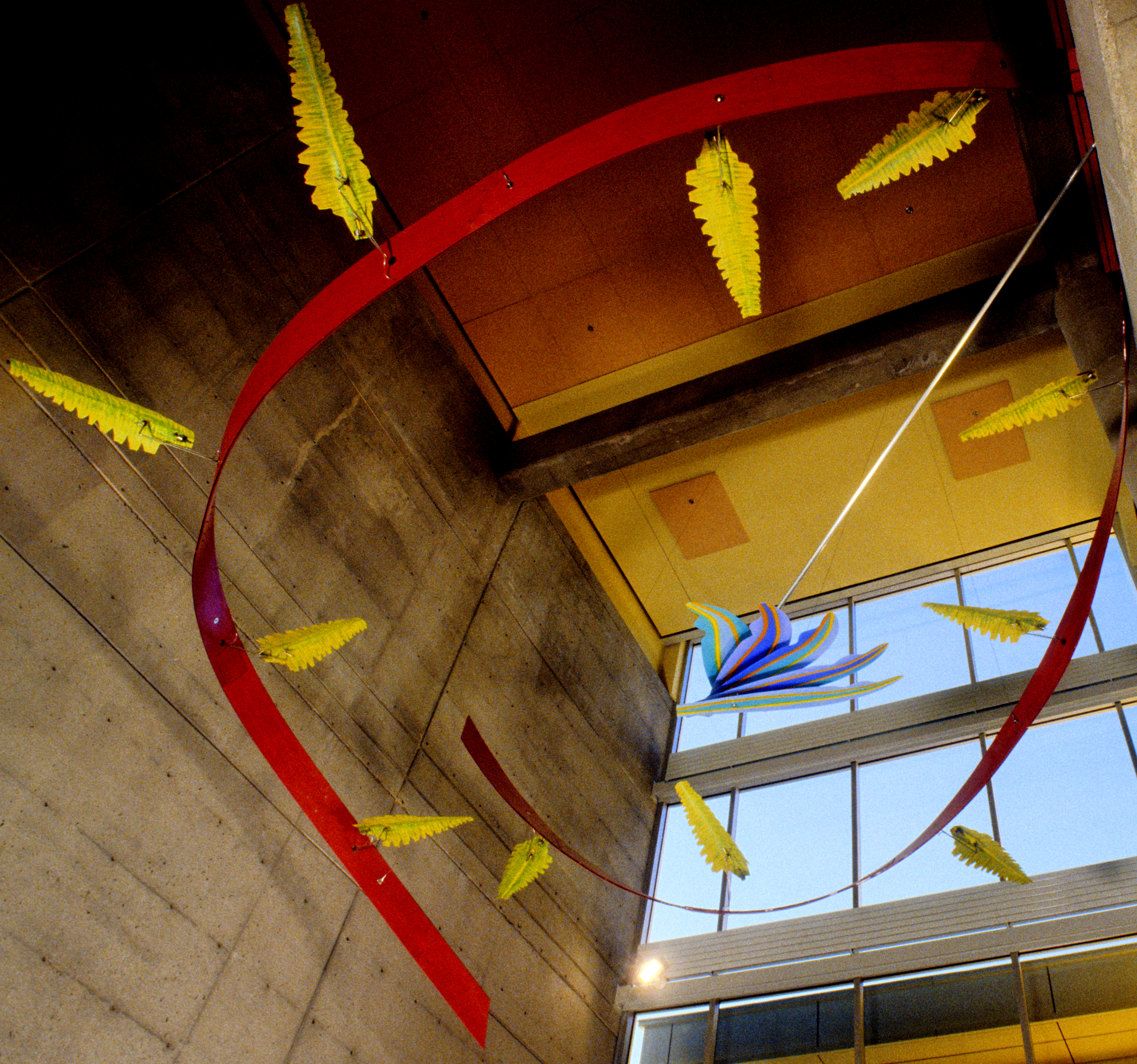
L'Éveil, CHUQ – Centre Mère-enfant, Quebec City, 2003

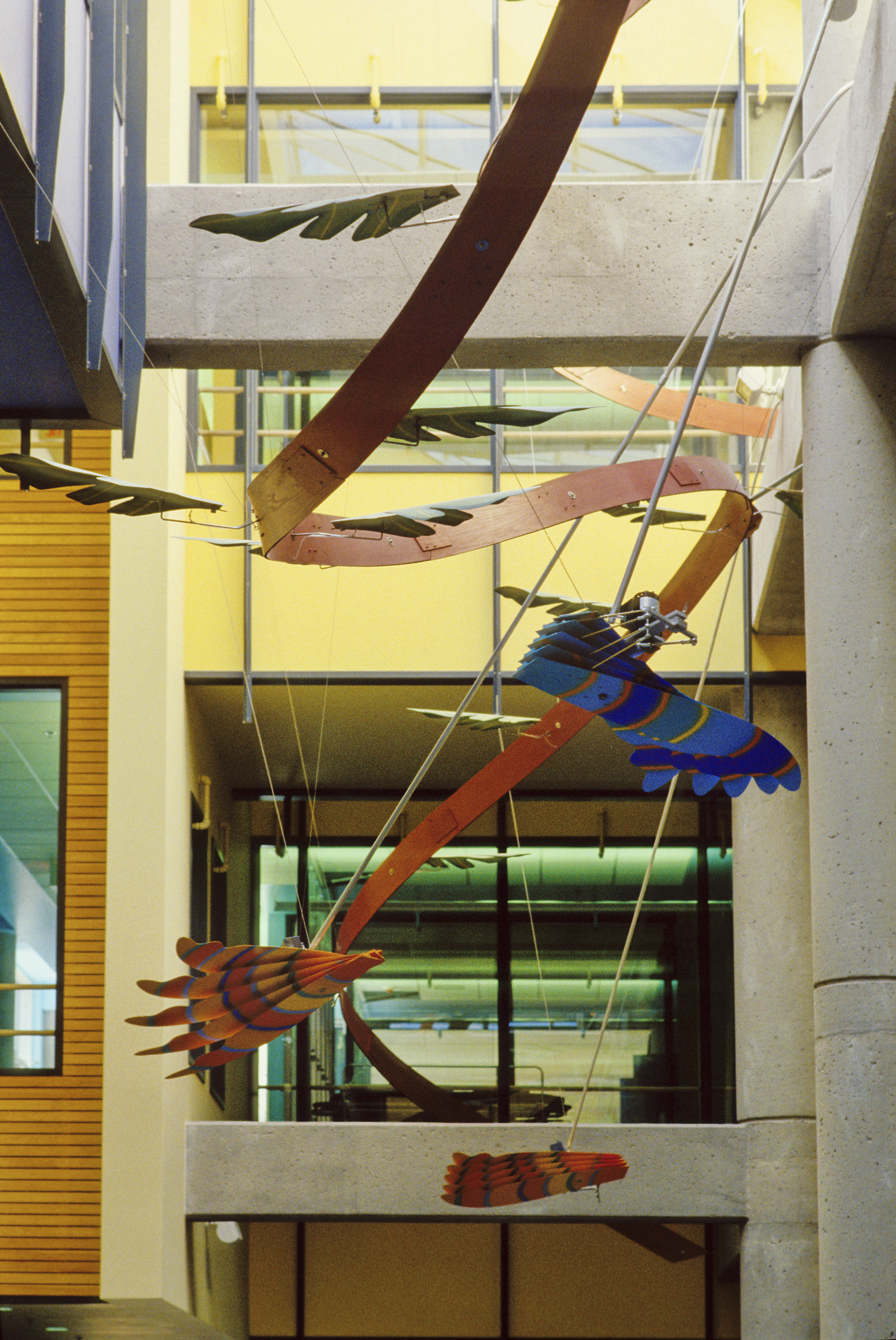
L'Éveil, CHUQ – Centre Mère-enfant, Quebec City, 2003

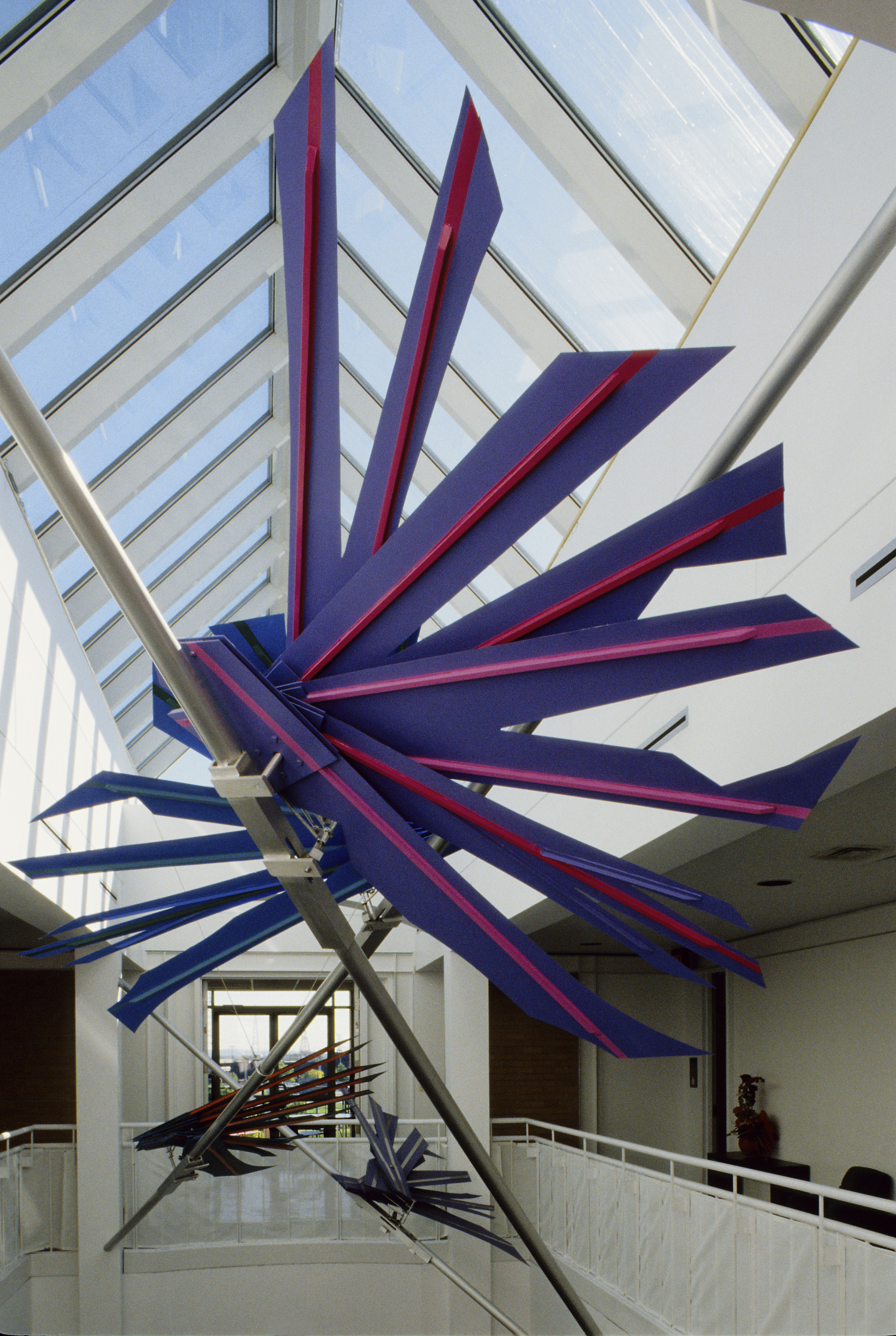
Trajectoires, Centre de recherche Fernand-Séguin, Montréal, 1992

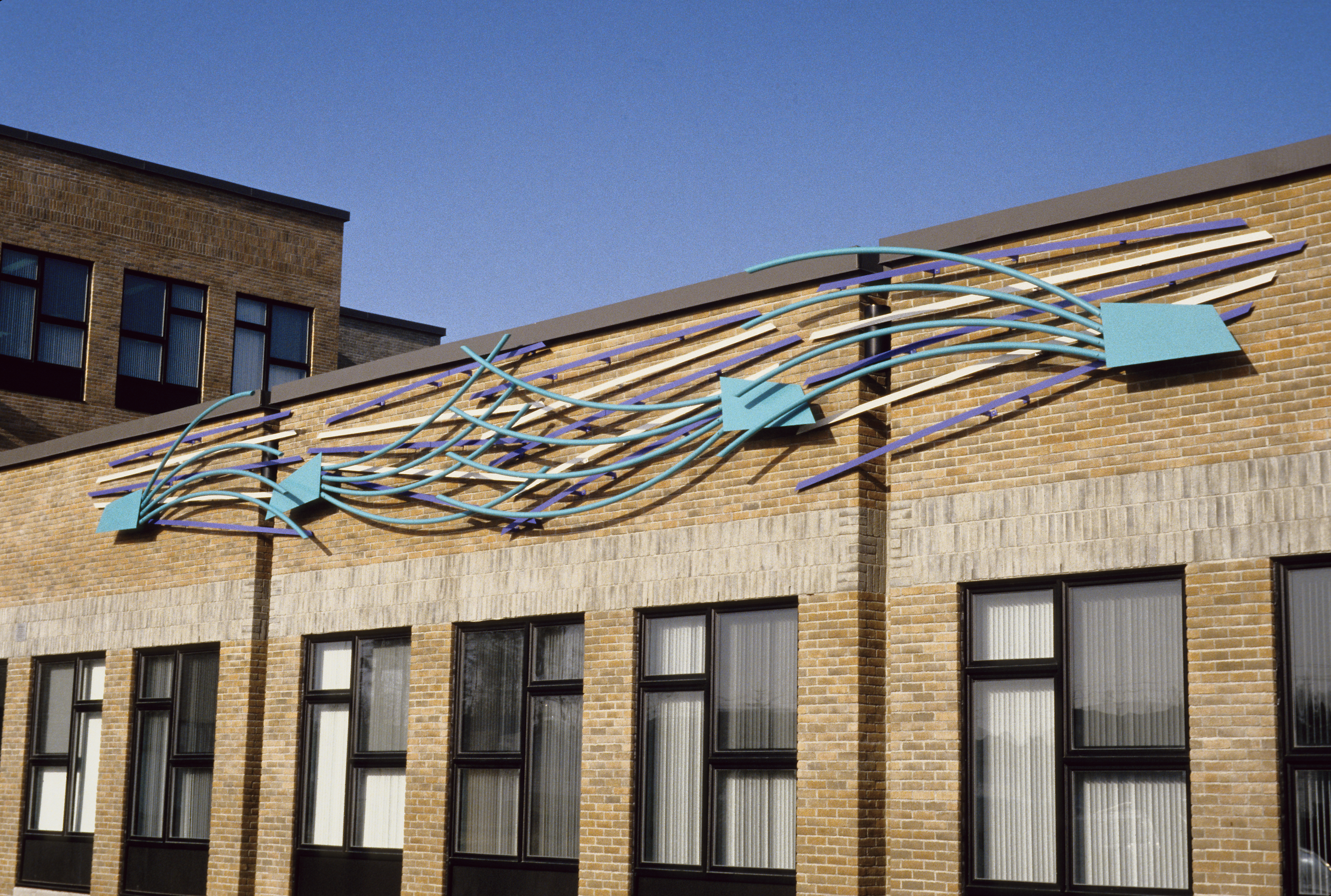
Interférences, École du Geai-Bleu, La Plaine, Quebec, 1992

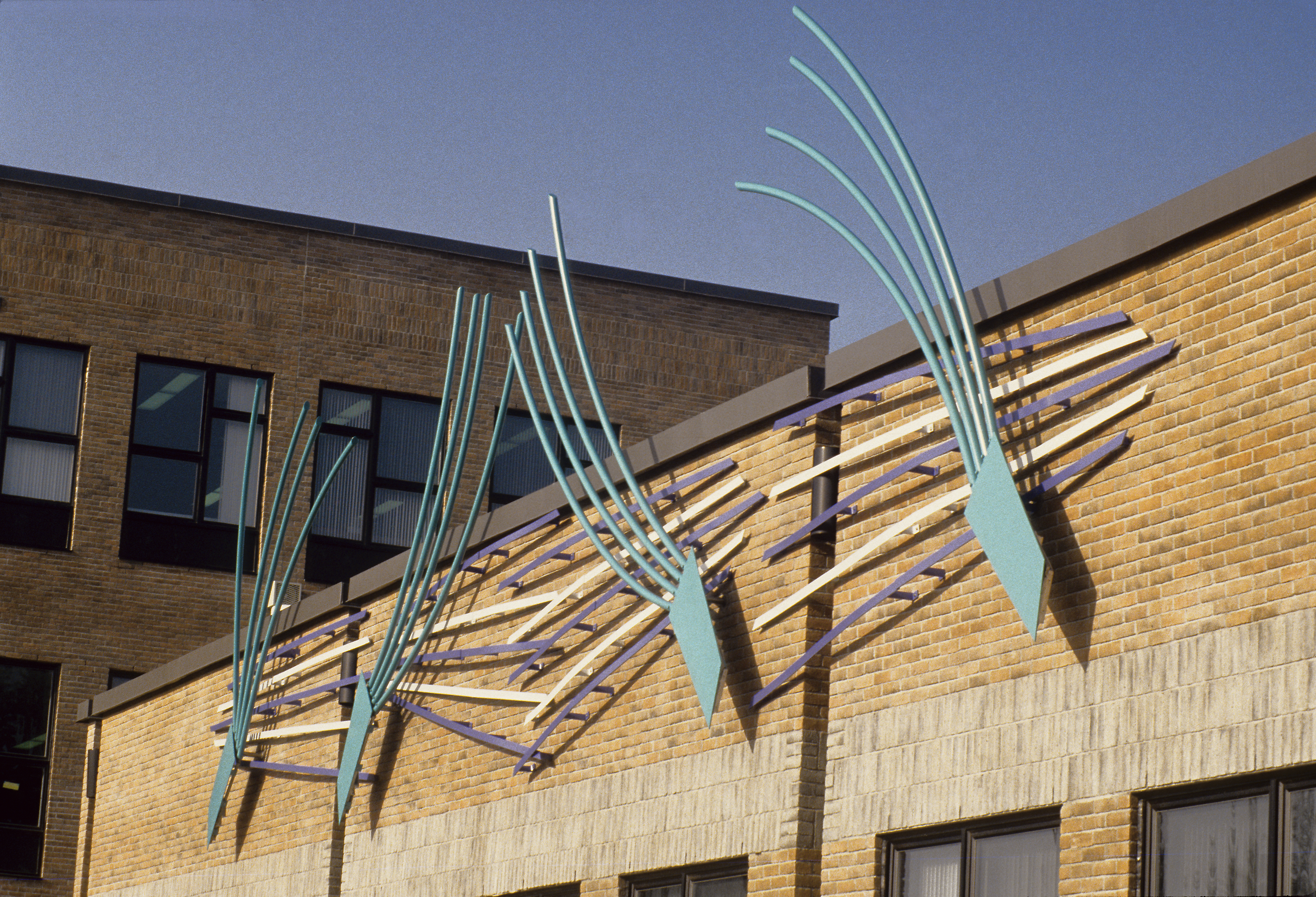
Interférences, École du Geai-Bleu, La Plaine, Quebec, 1992

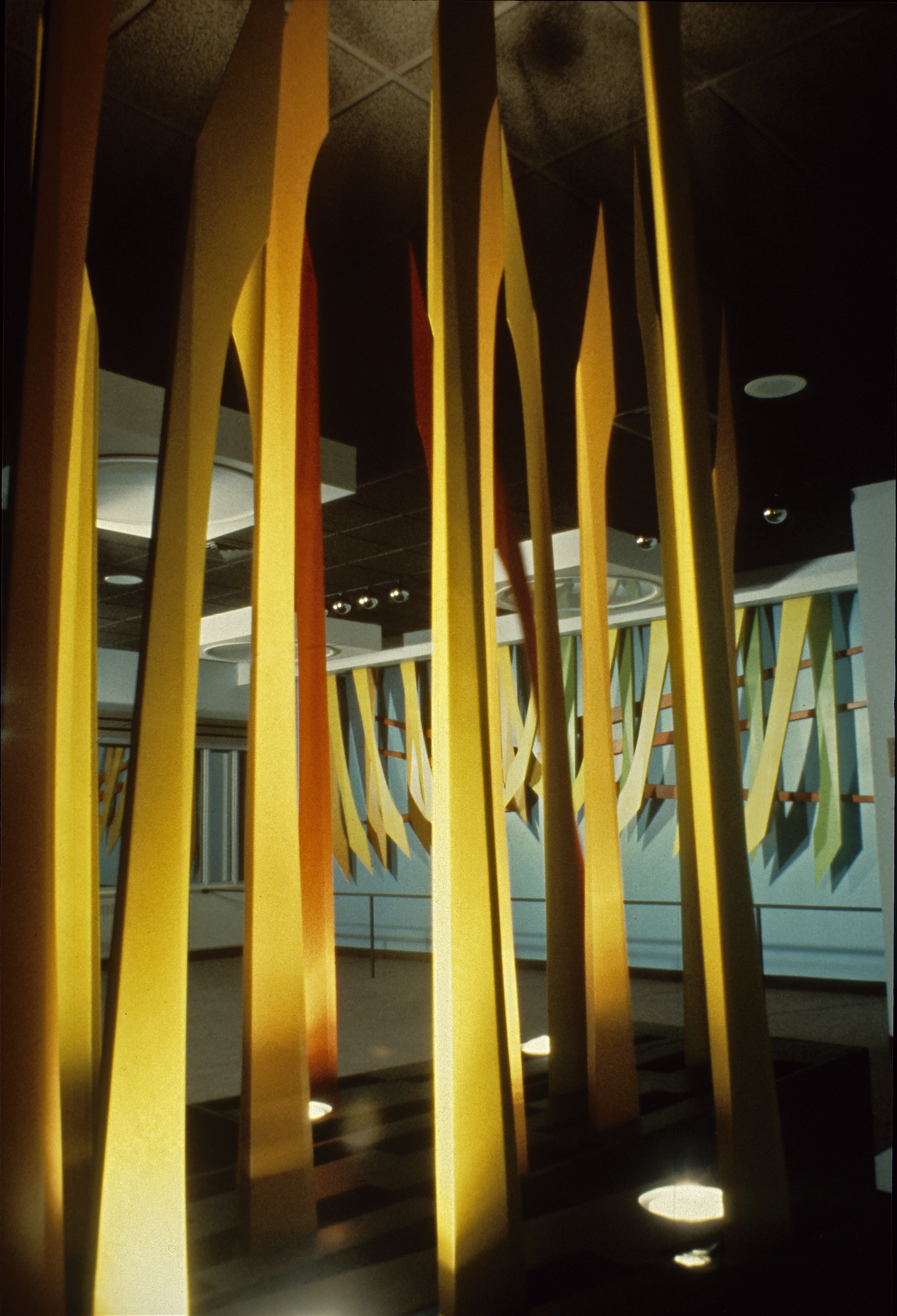
Jeux d’herbes, Centre régional hospitalier de Gatineau, Gatineau, 1983

== Solo exhibitions ==
- 1981, Centre d’exposition l'Imagier, Aylmer.
- 1982, Édifice Jos-Montferrand, Gatineau.
- 1988, Galerie Port-Maurice, Saint-Léonard.
- 1989, Musée régional de Rimouski, Rimouski.
- 1990, Centre d’exposition l’Imagier, Aylmer.
- 1990, Musée de Lachine, Lachine.
- 1991, Centre des arts contemporains du Québec, Montreal.
- 1991, Musée Pierre-Boucher, Trois-Rivières.
- 1991, Musée du Bas-Saint-Laurent, Rivière-du-Loup.
- 1991, Saint Mary's University Art Gallery, Halifax, Nova Scotia.
- 1992, Trajectoires, Bell Auditorium, Montreal.
- 1992, Goethe Institut, Montreal.
- 1993, Galerie Horace, Sherbrooke.
- 1993, Maison de la culture Frontenac, Montreal.
- 1994, Galerie d’art de Matane, Matane.
- 1995, Occurrence, Montreal.
- 1996, A SPACE Gallery, Toronto, Ontario.
- 1996, Observatoire 4, Belgo Building, Montreal.
- 1997, Glendon Art Gallery, York University, Toronto, Ontario.
- 1998, Definitively Superior Gallery, Thunder Bay, Ontario.
- 1998, Hamilton Artists Inc., Hamilton, Ontario.
- 1999, Observatoire 4, Belgo Building, Montreal.
- 1999, The New Gallery, Calgary, Alberta.
- 2000, Galerie des arts visuel, Université Laval, Quebec City.
- 2000, Plein Sud, Centre d’exposition en art actuel, Longueuil.
- 2000, Forest City, London, Ontario.
- 2001, Maison de la culture Frontenac, Montreal.
- 2002, Musée d’art contemporain des Laurentides, Saint-Jérôme.
- 2003, Galerie d’art de l’Université du Québec à Trois-Rivières, Trois-Rivières.
- 2009, Camaïeu d'ombres, Galerie d’art d'Outremont, Montreal.
- 2011, Ombres sous tension, Circa, Montreal.
- 2013, Camaïeu d'ombres, Galerie de l'Université de Sherbrooke, Sherbrooke.
- 2013, Traquenard, Maison de la culture Côtes-des-Neiges, Montréal.

== Public art ==
- 1981, Palais des congrès de Gatineau, Gatineau, 35m x 25m.
- 1983, Centre hospitalier régional de Gatineau, Gatineau, 16m x 4,50m x 3m.
- 1985, Bibliothèque Lucien-Lalonde, Gatineau, 9m x 9m x 5m.
- 1986, Saint-Léonard Pool, pillar-sculpture, 3m x 61 cm x 61 cm.
- 1986, CLSC Centre-Sud, Montreal, 6m x 3m x 5m.
- 1990, Pierrefonds Library, outdoor mural, 8m x 6m.
- 1992, Centre de recherche Fernand-Seguin, Montreal, 8m x 4m x 5m.
- 1992, École Geai-Bleu, outdoor mural, La Plaine, 25m x 9m.
- 1995, Parc Marie-Victorin, Longueuil, outdoor sculpture, 4.40m x 3m x 2.40 m.
- 2000, C.P.F. de Mont-Laurier, Mont-Laurier, 8.40m x 6.45m x 3.75m.
- 2002, Canal de la Thielle, Parc de sculptures, Switzerland.
- 2002, École Pierre-Elliot-Trudeau, Vaudreuil, 10m x 7.20m x 3m.
- 2002, École Lambert-Closse, Saint-Léonard, outdoor mural, 9m x 1.80m.
- 2003, CHUQ Centre mère-enfant, Quebec City, 63m x 8m x 14m.
- 2004, Centre de formation professionnel de Lachine, Lachine, 6m x 4m.
- 2004, École des métiers du meuble de Montréal, Montreal, 5.70m x 2.85m.
- 2004, Symmes Junior High School, Gatineau, 10m x 6m x 2m.
- 2004, École secondaire Jean-Jacques-Rousseau, Boisbriand, 15m x 8m x 3m.
- 2005, École Saint-Grégoire-le-Grand, outdoor sculpture, Montreal, 3.50m x 1.80m.
- 2006, Centre d’hébergement Maison-Pie-XII, Rouyn-Noranda, 6m x 1.25m x 5m.
- 2007, Bibliothèque Rina-Lasnier, Joliette, 5m x 1.5m.
- 2008, Centre de formation Nova, Châteauguay, 9m x 8m x 5.3m.
- 2008, École régionale du Vent-Nouveau, Longueuil, 9m x 9m x 3.80m.
- 2009, Centre hospitalier de Granby, outdoor sculpture, Granby, 5m x 3.2m x 4m.
- 2011, Aréna de Salaberry, mural 3.06 x 4m; hanging sculpture, Salaberry, 18.8m x 10.6m x 11m
- 2011, Centre d’hébergement Roland-Leclerc, hanging sculpture, Trois-Rivières, 26m x 12m x 9m.

== Publications ==
- Traînée rouge dans un soleil de lait, poetry, Éditions Naaman, Sherbrooke, 1984, ISBN 9782890402973.
- Le ressac des ombres, novel, Éditions de l’Hexagone, Montreal, 1987.
- Lack of Understanding about Copyright: Aberrations and Abuse (English translation), Espace, no.73, 8-14, 2005.
- L'installation en mouvement: Une esthétique de la violence, essai, Les Éditions d'art Le Sabord, Trois-Rivières, 2007, ISBN 978-2-922685-47-3.

== Bibliography ==
- Aboussouan, Rémi, Camaïeu: une exposition qui ne restera pas dans l’ombre, Le Point d’Outremont, September 11, 2009.
- Bernatchez, Raymond, Morosoli et Boissonnet: comme un bain de mousse, La Presse, Montreal, January 6, 1996.
- Bernatchez, Raymond, Trois artistes réfléchissent sur le temps, La Presse, Montreal, May 25, 1996.
- Bertrand, Pierre, À pierre fendre, Éditions Humanitas, 33-41, Montreal, 1994.
- Campbell, James D., Temporal Integers: Speculations on the Sculpture of Joëlle Morosoli, exhibition catalogue, 1993.
- Connolly, Jocelyne, De l’architecturé à l’affect, Etc. Montréal, no. 36, 48-51, Montreal, 1997.
- Connolly, Jocelyne, Architecturer le temps, Éditions Art LeSabord, exhibition catalogue, Trois-Rivières, 2002.
- Connolly, Jocelyne, Joëlle Morosoli, des mirages et leur mise en scène, Espace, no. 99, 48-49, Montreal, 2012.
- Dumont, Jean, L’homme inachevé, Le Devoir, Montreal, July 27, 1991.
- Fisette, Serge, Morosoli et la transparence de l'être, Espace, vol. 5, no. 2, Montreal, 1989.
- Fisette, Serge, Allégorie de la contrainte, Joëlle Morosoli, Glendon Art Gallery catalogue, Toronto, 1997.
- Fisette, Serge, La sculpture et le vent. Femmes Sculpteures au Québec, CDD3D, 49-56-57-58, Montreal, spring 2004.
- Goudreault, Gisèle, Sculpture motorisée, Le Droit, 25, Ottawa, September 3, 1983.
- Hakim, Mona, Comme un caméléon inerte et silencieux, Le Devoir, Montreal, November 14, 1993.
- Julio-Paquin, Jean, Intégration des arts à l'architecture. Cinquante ans d’art public, Revue Formes, vol. 8, no. 1, 28 and 30, February 2012.
- Letocha, Louise, Pièces\Pièges: Joëlle Morosoli, Espace, 17-18-19, vol. 7 no. 1, Montreal, 1990.
- Murray, Karl-Gilbert, Astructuralité et enfermement psychologique, SPIRALE no. 190, 6-7, Montreal, May–June 2003.
- Murray, Karl-Gilbert, Ombres sous tension, un environnement made in Circa, exhibition catalogue, 2011.
- Paquin, Nycole, Le corps juge — Sciences de la cognition et esthétique des arts visuels, XYZ Éditeurs and Presses Universitaires de Vincennes, Montreal and Paris, 1997.
- Paquin, Nycole, Sculpture du temps, Patience et longueur d’espace, Espace, no. 37, 23-27, Montreal, fall-winter 1996.
- Paquin, Nycole, Joëlle Morosoli, Des revenants persistants, Espace, no. 91, 28-29, Montreal, winter 2010.
- Regimbald, Manon, Espacer le temps: autour d’Architecturer le temps de Joëlle Morosoli, Espace, no. 64, 39-40, Montreal, spring 2003.
- Riendeau, Isabelle, Le mouvement comme figure de la contrainte, Vie des arts, vol. 44, no. 177, 58-60, Montreal, 1999-2000.
- Roy, Nathalie, Art en mouvement, l’effet Morosoli, Vie des arts, no. 217, 72-73, Montreal, 2009-2010.
- Simard, France, L’émotion par le mouvement, Le Droit, 25, Ottawa, November 9, 1985.
- Uzel, Jean-Philippe, Une inquiétante étrangeté, Etc Montréal, no. 51, 56-57, Montreal, fall 2000.
- Wood, Elizabeth, Joëlle Morosoli: Sous la surface: la sculpture tranquille, Vie des arts, no. 139, Montreal, 1991.
- Wood, Elizabeth, Joëlle Morosoli: Pièces/Pièges, An exhibition of sculpture in movement, Arts Atlantic, no. 42, 3, Prince Edouard Island, 1992.

== See also ==
- Kinetic art
- Installation art
