= Israel (name) =

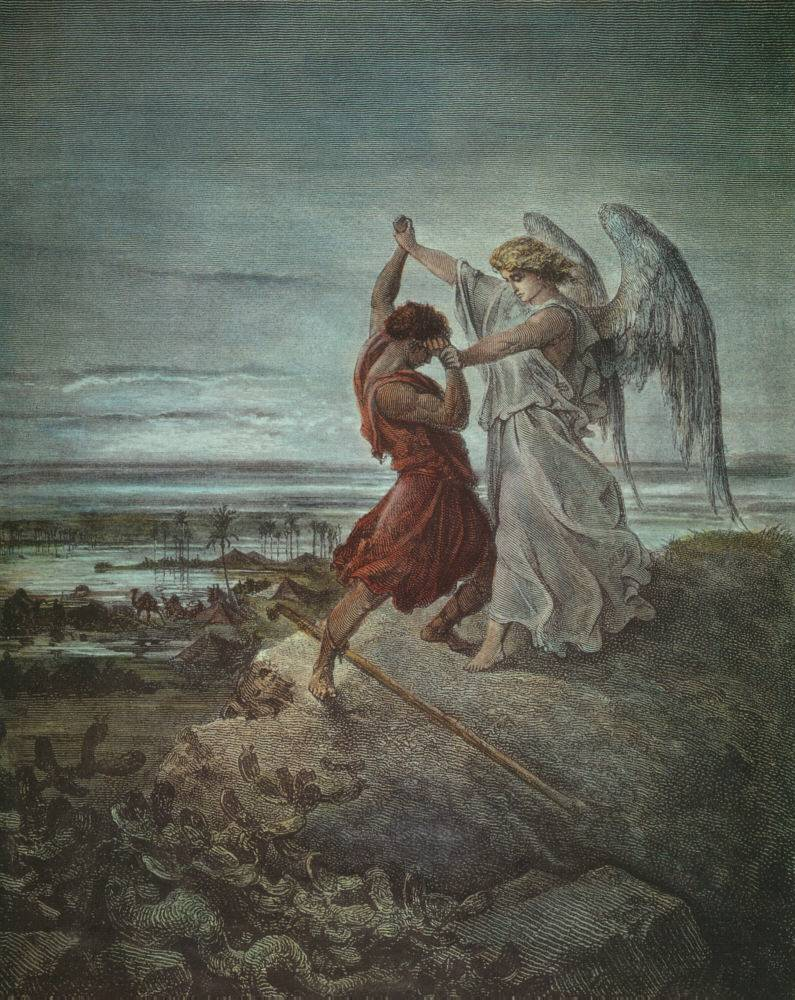
- Gustave Doré's Jacob Wrestling with the Angel (1855), depicting the story of Jacob's renaming as Israel
- Pronunciation: In English: /ˈɪzriəl/ IZ-ree-əl /ˈɪzreɪəl/ IZ-ray-əl; In Hebrew: Modern: [jisʁaˈʔel] Biblical: [jiɬraːˈʔeːl]
- Gender: Male
- Language: Semitic

Origin
- Origin: El (deity)
- Meaning: "He struggles with God"
- Region of origin: Near East

Israel (Hebrew: יִשְׂרָאֵל, Modern: Yīsraʾel, Tiberian: Yīsrāʾēl) is a masculine Hebrew name.

== Etymology ==
In Hebrew, the name Israel comes from sara (Hebrew: שָׂרָה, lit. 'to struggle [with]') and el (Hebrew: אֵל, lit. 'God'). After Jacob wrestles with the angel in the Book of Genesis, the Angel of the Lord tells him that his name is now Israel, because he has "struggled with God and man and prevailed" (Genesis 32:28, 35:10). The Hebrew verb sarita, used in the passage, has also been translated into English as "striven," "wrestled," and "contended."

The name is frequently seen as a reference to the Jewish people's ongoing struggle with God and the obligation they have to explore their faith. According to John Day, the name Israel probably means 'El will rule', which is an indication of the Canaanite deity's importance in pre-monarchic Israelite religion, an etymology considered inline with evidence from Ugaritic texts. Mark S. Smith similarly notes that the name is not Yahwistic, but El theophoric, arguing these preserved names and ancient epithets point to El's original prominence.

The word "wrestlers" in Ancient Greek is "palaestis," which may be related to "Palaistinê" used by Herodotus. Palaistinê would then mean "Land of the wrestlers" or "Land of Israel."

== History ==
The given name is attested during the Bronze Age in Eblaite (𒅖𒊏𒅋, Išrail) and Ugaritic (𐎊𐎌𐎗𐎛𐎍, Yšrʾil) languages. Ysrỉꜣr (Ancient Egyptian: 𓇌𓊃𓏤𓏤𓂋𓇋𓄿𓂋𓏤) appears c. 1208 BCE on the Merneptah Stele of Egypt, where it refers to a foreign people, likely the Israelites.

The word Israel has a strong association with Judaism. In the Book of Genesis, after God renames the patriarch Jacob as Israel, his twelve sons become the heads of the Twelve Tribes of Israel. The Land of Israel (Hebrew: ארץ ישראל, romanized: Eretz Yisrael) is mentioned throughout the Hebrew Bible as the home of nations such as Israel and Judah. Today, Israel also refers to the State of Israel, which is home to almost half of the world's Jewish population.

In Nazi Germany, under the Name Change Ordinance, male Jews who did not have "typically Jewish" given names were forced to add Israel to their name.

== Usage ==
The name is popular among modern Jews, especially those from an Orthodox Jewish background, and, to a lesser extent, Christians. Its Hebrew form is Yisra'el, which is romanized as Israel in English and Spanish and as Yisroel in Yiddish or Ladino. Diminutive forms include Izzy (English), Israelito (Spanish), Isser (Yiddish), Srul (Yiddish), Sruli (Yiddish), Srulik (Yiddish) and Srulke (Yiddish).

== Given name ==
- Israel, formerly known as Jacob, Biblical Patriarch and the progenitor of the Twelve Tribes of Israel
- Israel (Bishop of Caucasian Albania), 7th century CE
- Israel (Nestorian patriarch), Patriarch of the Church of the East in 961
- Israel Abanikanda (born 2002), American football player
- Israel Abrahams (1858–1925), British scholar and author
- Israel Abrams (born 2008), American football player
- Israel Adesanya (born 1989), New Zealand professional mixed martial artist, kickboxer, and boxer.
- Israel Alter (1901–1979), Jewish composer and last chief cantor in Hanover, Germany
- Israel Asper (1932–2003), Canadian media magnate
- Israel of Axum, Emperor of Ethiopia in the 6th century CE
- Israel Baker (1919–2011), American violinist and concertmaster
- Israel Bascón (born 1987), Spanish football player
- Israel Beilin (1888–1989), the birth name of American composer Irving Berlin
- Yisroel Belsky (1938–2016), American rosh yeshiva and posek
- Israel Bettan (1889–1957), Lithuanian-American rabbi and professor
- Israel Bissell (1752–1823), American post rider and colonial militia officer
- Israel Broussard (born 1994), American actor
- Yisrael Campbell, American-born Israeli comedian
- Israel Charny (1931–2024), Israeli psychologist and genocide scholar
- Israel Cruz (born 1983), Australian singer
- Israel Dagg (born 1988), New Zealand rugby player
- Israel ben Eliezer (1698–1760), mystic and founder of Hasidic Judaism
- Israel Elimelech (born 1960), Israeli basketball player
- Israel Englander (born 1948), American billionaire hedge fund manager
- Israel Epstein (1915–2005), Polish-born Chinese journalist
- Israel Lewis Feinberg (1872–1941), American physician and coroner
- Israel Finkelstein (born 1949), Israeli archaeologist
- Israel Folau (born 1989), Australian rugby player
- Yisrael Friedman of Ruzhin (1796–1850), Hasidic rebbe
- Israel García (footballer, born 1999) (born 1999), Mexican footballer
- Yisrael Galili (Hebrew: ישראל גלילי, born Yisrael Balashnikov 1923–1995), Israeli weapons designer.
- Israel Gelfand (1913–2009), Russian mathematician
- Israel Gohberg (1928–2009), Moldovan-Soviet and Israeli mathematician
- Israel Gollancz (1863–1930), British professor of English literature
- Israil Gurung (born 1989), Indian footballer
- Israel the Grammarian (895–969), 10th-century European scholar
- Israel Hands (1701–1724?), 18th-century pirate
- Israel Halperin, (1911–2007), Canadian mathematician and social activist
- Israel Nathan Herstein (1923–1988), Polish-Canadian-American mathematician
- Yisroel Hopstein (1737–1814), Maggid of Kozhnitz
- Israel Houghton (born 1971), American singer and Christian worship leader
- Israel Huaytari Martínez (born 1985), Bolivian politician
- Israel Idonije (born 1980), Nigeria-born Canadian player of American football
- Israel Jacob (1729–1803), Prussian banker and philanthropist
- Israel Jacobs (1726–c. 1796), British-American colonial legislator
- Israel Jacobson (1768–1828), German philanthropist and communal organiser
- Yisrael Meir Kagan (1838–1933), rabbi and posek known as the Chofetz Chaim
- Israel Kamakawiwoʻole (1959–1997), Hawaiian singer and spiritual leader
- Yisrael Mendel Kaplan (1913–1985), teacher at Chicago's Hebrew Theological College
- Israel Katz (Hebrew: יִשְׂרָאֵל כַּ״ץ; born 1955), Israeli Minister of Defence
- Yisrael Katz (1927–2010), Israeli scholar and civil servant
- Israel Keyes (1978–2012), American serial killer, rapist, bank robber, burglar, and arsonist
- Israel Kirzner (born 1930), American economist
- Israel Jacob Kligler (1888–1944), Austro-Hungarian microbiologist, professor, and Zionist
- Israel of Krems, 14th-/15th-century Austrian rabbi
- Yisrael Kristal (1903–2017), Polish-Israeli supercentenarian
- Israel "Izzy" Lang (1942–2008), American football running back
- Yisrael Meir Lau (born 1937), former Chief Rabbi of Israel
- Israel Levitan (1912–1982), American sculptor and painter
- Israel Lewy (1841–1917), German scholar of Judaic texts
- Israel Lipski (1865–1887), British convicted murderer
- Israel Loring (1682–1772), British American Puritan minister
- Israel Lovy (1773–1832), European ḥazzan and composer
- Israel Lyons (1739–1775), English mathematician and botanist
- Israel Machado (born 1960), Brazilian basketball player
- Israel Madaye (born 1988), Chadian archer
- Mohammad Israil Mansuri, Indian politician
- Yisroel Mantel, American Orthodox rabbi
- Israel D. Maulsby (1781–1839), American politician from Maryland
- Israel Mireles (born c.1983), Mexican convicted murderer
- Israel Mukuamu (born 1999), American football player
- Yisroel Nekrasov (born 1970), Russian translator from Yiddish and poet
- Israel C. O'Neal (1818–1899), American politician from Virginia
- Israel Ochoa (born 1964), Colombian cyclist
- Yisroel Ber Odesser (1888–1994), Breslov rabbi
- Israel Olatunde (born 2002), Irish sprinter
- Israel Ori (1658–1711), Armenian diplomat
- Israel Pellew (1758–1832), British admiral
- Israel Pickens (1780–1827), American lawyer and politician
- Israel Pike (1853–1925), American baseball player
- Israel Pilot, undergarment inventor
- Israel Pliner (1896–1939), Soviet secret police functionary
- Yisroel Avrohom Portugal (1923–2019), Skulener Rebbe
- Israel Putnam (1718–1790), American general
- Israel Raybon (born 1973), American football player
- Israel Regardie (1907–1985), British occultist
- Israel B. Richardson (1815–1862), American general
- Israel Rivera, American soldier witness to Abu Ghraib conditions
- Israel Ruiz Jr. (born 1943), New York politician
- Israel Schwartz, Polish or Hungarian witness to an assault
- Ysrael Seinuk (1931–2010), Cuban structural engineer
- Israel Shahak (1933–2001), Israeli author
- Israel Shamir (born 1947), Swedish antisemitic writer
- Israel Sheinfeld (born 1976), Israeli basketball player
- Yisrael Shomer (born 1977), Israeli officer in the IDF with the rank of lieutenant colonel
- Israel Sieff, Baron Sieff (1889–1972), English businessman, life peer, and Zionist
- Israel Tal (1924–2010), an Israeli general and tank developer
- Israel Vázquez (born 1977), Mexican boxer
- Israel Wachser (1892–1919), Russian writer
- Israel Wamiau (born 1994), Indonesian footballer
- Israel Weinstein (1893–1975), American physician and bacteriologist
- Yisroel Dovid Weiss (born 1956), Neturei Karta activist
- Israel Zamosz (c.1700–1772) Polish-Lithuanian Talmudist, mathematician and poet
- Israel Zangwill (1864–1926), British author
- Israel Joseph Zevin (1872–1926), Belarusian-American humorist
- Israel Zilber (1933 – after 1980), Latvian-Soviet chess player
- Ysrael Zúñiga (born 1976), Peruvian footballer

== Surname ==
- Al Israel (1936–2011), American actor
- Alex Israel (born 1982), American artist
- Alex Israel (businessman), American businessman and founder of Metropolis Technologies
- Edward Israel (1859–1884), American astronomer and polar explorer
- Franco Israel (born 2000), Uruguayan footballer
- Gerli Israel (born 1995), Estonian footballer
- Guni Israeli (born 1984), Israeli basketball player
- Harry Frederick Israel, later known as Harry Frederick Harlow (1905–1981), an American psychologist
- Jonathan Israel (born 1946), British historian
- Lee Israel (1939–2014), American author known for committing literary forgery
- Leon Israel (1887–1955), American cartoonist
- Léon Israël (1906–1944), French doctor, resistance fighter, and Jew executed by the French collaborationist Milice.
- Märt Israel (born 1983), Estonian discus thrower
- Martha Israel (1905–c. 1967), German politician
- Melvin Israel, later known as Mel Allen (1913–1996), American sportscaster
- Menasseh Ben Israel (1604–1657), Portuguese rabbi and scholar
- Quentin Israel (1934–2007), Sri Lankan rugby union player, coach and school teacher
- Rinus Israël (1942–2025), Dutch football player and manager
- Robert Decatur Israel (1826–1908), San Diego pioneer, keeper of the Old Point Loma lighthouse
- Samuel Israel III (born 1959), American convicted felon and former hedge fund manager
- Scott Israel (born 1956/57), American Police Chief of Opa-locka, former Sheriff of Broward County
- Steve Israel (born 1958), American politician
- Steve Israel (American football) (born 1969), American football player
- Wilfrid Israel (1899–1943), Anglo-German businessman and philanthropist
- Yuri Izrael (1930–2014), Russian scientist and vice-chairman of the Intergovernmental Panel on Climate Change

== Fictional characters ==
- Israel Boone, son of title character in TV series Daniel Boone

== See also ==
- Jew (word)
- List of biblical names
- Names of the Levant
- Theophoric name#El

== Bibliography ==
- Jacobson, David (1999). "Palestine and Israel". Bulletin of the American Schools of Oriental Research. 313 (313): 65–74. doi:10.2307/1357617. JSTOR 1357617. S2CID 163303829.
- Jacobson, David (2001). "When Palestine Meant Israel". Biblical Archaeology Review. 27 (3). Archived from the original on 2011-07-25.
