= Julius Harburger =

American politician (1851–1914)

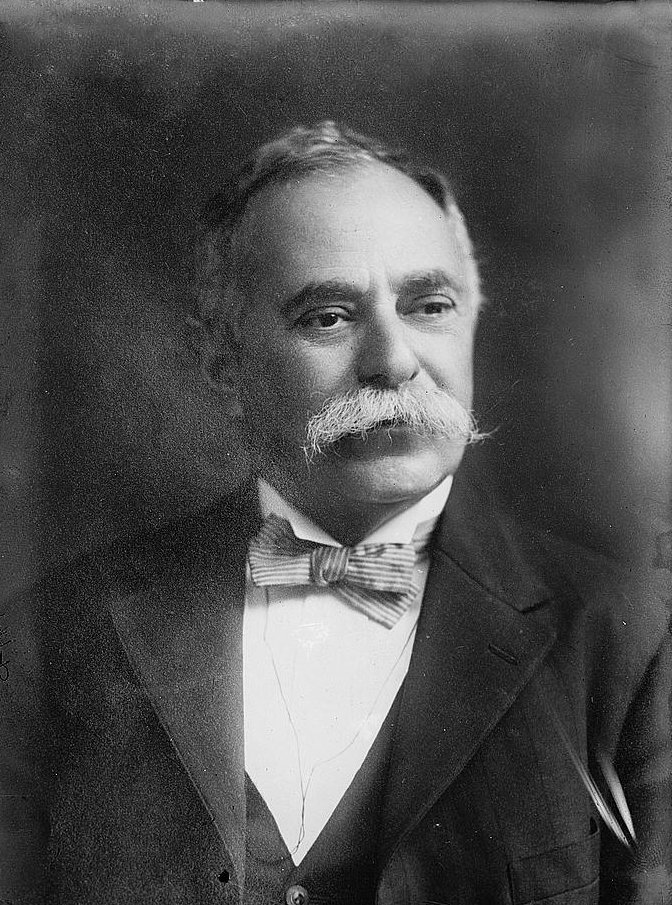
Julius Harburger circa 1913

Julius Harburger (February 22, 1851 – November 9, 1914) was a New York City politician. He was elected as the Sheriff of New York County, New York, from 1911 to December 31, 1913. He also served as the Coroner of New York City from 1905 to 1911.

== Early life ==
He was born on February 22, 1851 in New York City's 11th ward. He was educated in the city's public schools and studied law for a time before working in a dry goods store. He eventually started a tailor's trimming store on 5th Street.

== Politics ==
Harburger began his political involvement as a member of the Republican Party, but left the party after he was died an appointed to the New York Custom House. He became an ally of Alfred Steckler, serving as the chairman of the county committee of his Independent County Organization. Harburger followed Steckler into the Tammany Hall organization, but they both left after four years.

Harburger was chief clerk of the Fourth District Civil Court for nine years while Steckler was on the bench. In 1895, he was appointed to the New York City excise board by mayor William Lafayette Strong. Harburger was a member of the New York State Assembly (New York Co., 10th D.) in 1898, 1899, 1900 and 1901. In 1903 and 1904, he was an undersheriff of New York County. In 1905, he George Frederick Shrady Jr., Peter P. Acritelli, and Peter Dooley were the Tammany Hall candidates for Coroner of New York County. He investigated the deaths of Albert J. Adams, James E. Pepper, Charles T. Barney, Theodore Allen, and Elsie Sigel. He was the Sheriff of New York County from 1911 to December 31, 1913.

He died on November 9, 1914, at his home on St. Mark's Place in Manhattan of pneumonia.

New York State Assembly
Preceded by Jeremiah J. Sullivan	New York State Assembly; New York County, 10th District; 1898–1901	Succeeded by John F. McCullough
