= George Frederick Shrady =

George Frederick Shrady may refer to:

- George Frederick Shrady Sr. (1837–1907), American physician
- George Frederick Shrady Jr. (1862–1933), his son, coroner
