= Coroner of New York City =

Public official in New York City

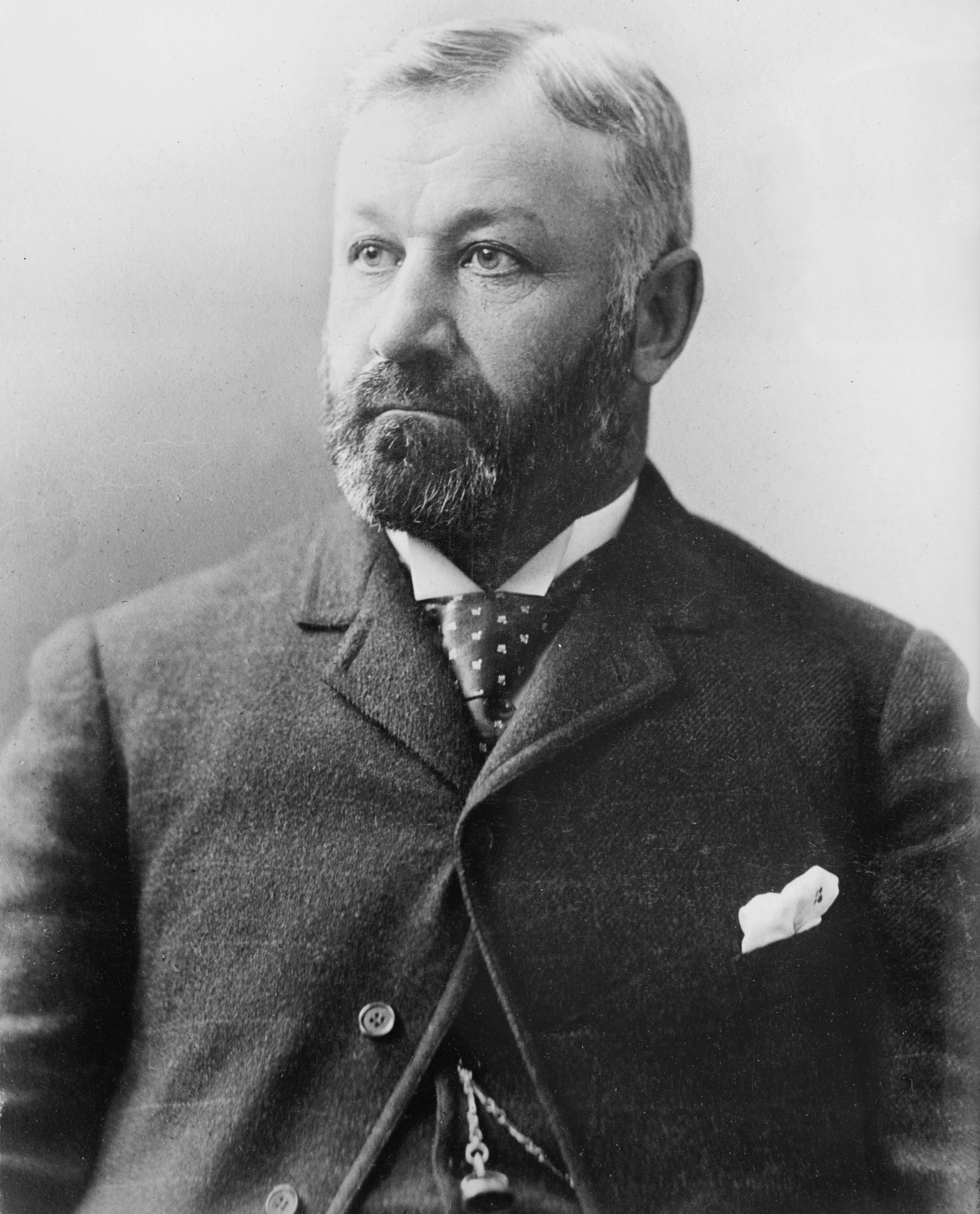
Richard Croker served New York County from 1873 to 1876

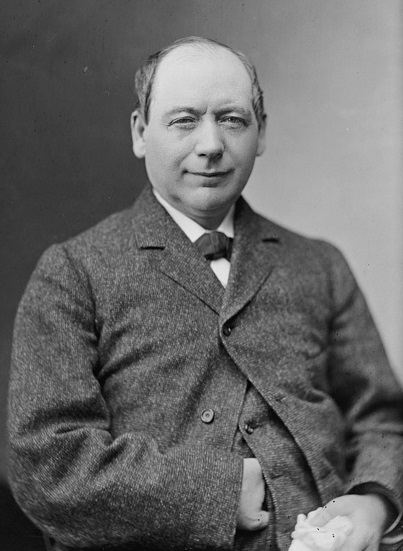
Anthony Eickhoff served New York County from 1874 to 1876

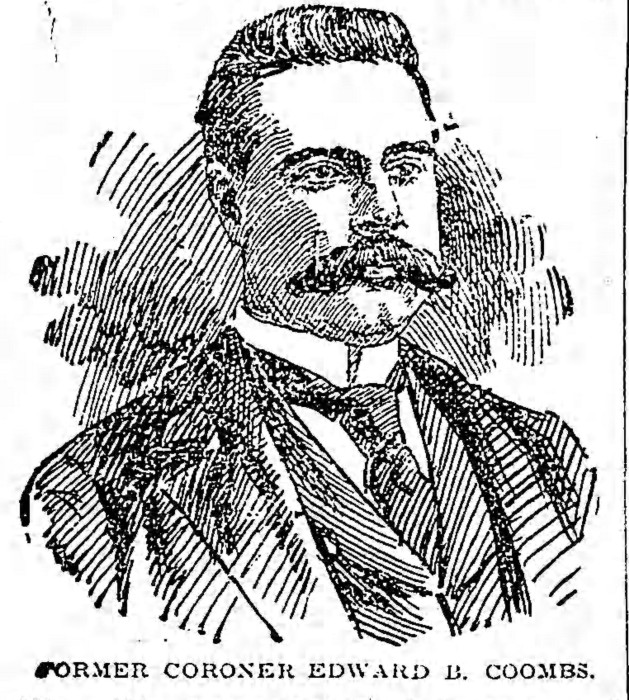
Edward Butler Coombs served Kings County from 1896 to 1897 before being arrested

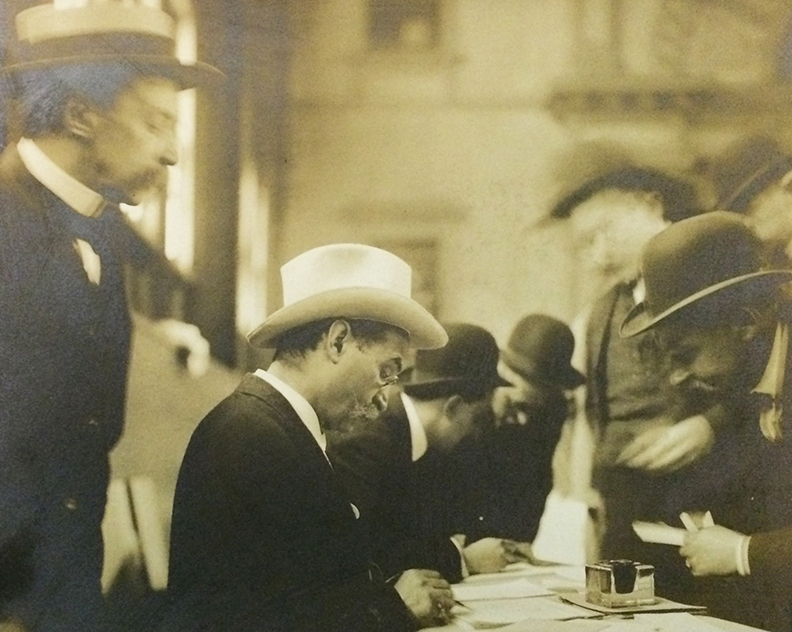
Gustav Scholer served New York County from 1902 to 1905

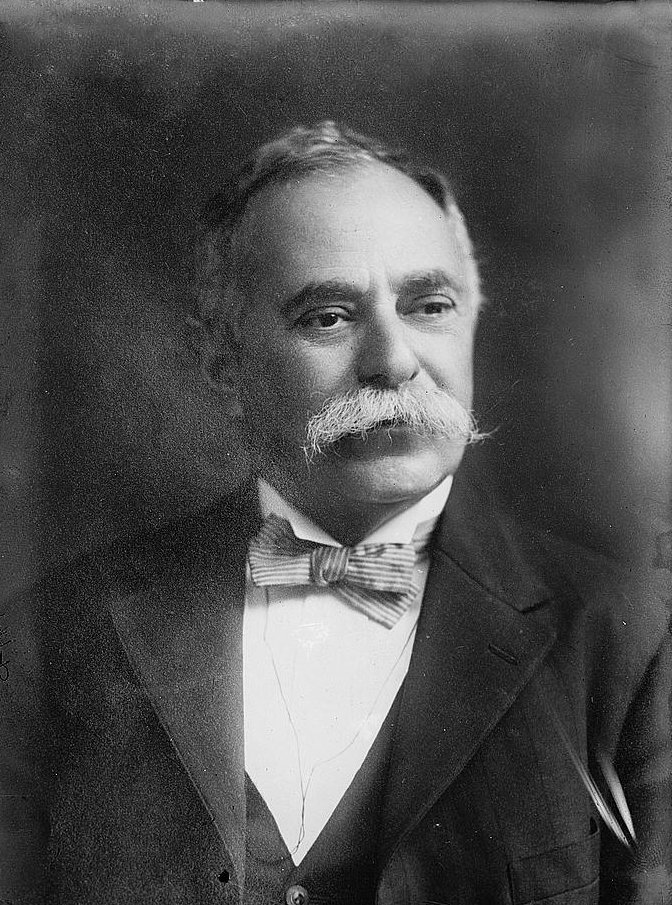
Julius Harburger served New York County in 1907

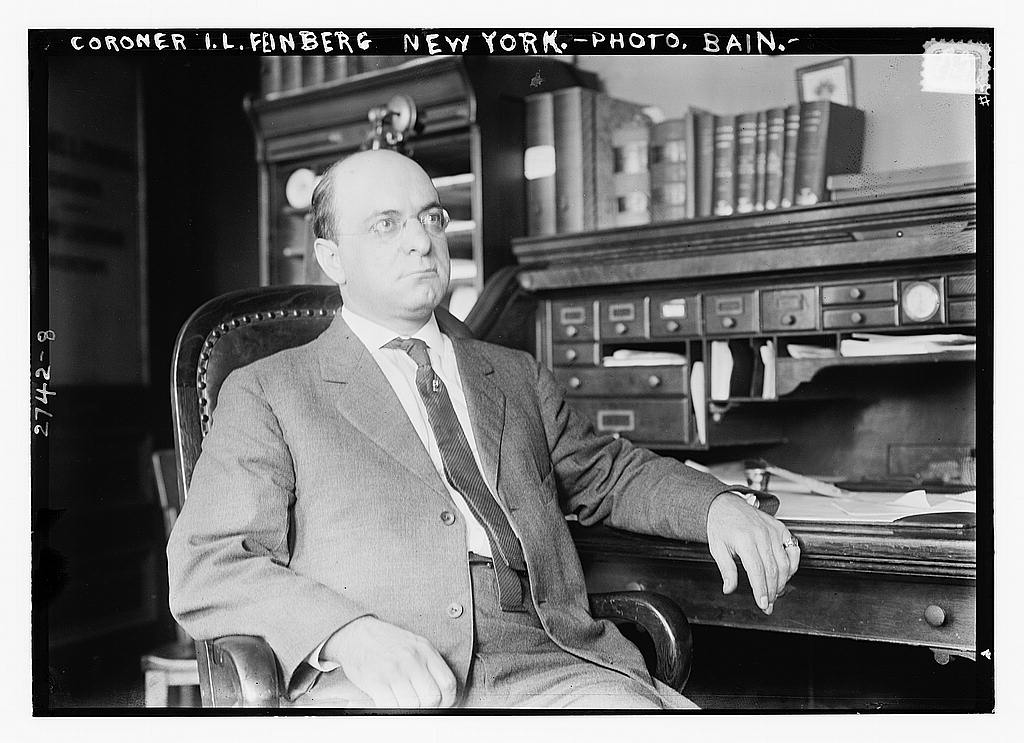
Israel Lewis Feinberg, served New York County from 1910 to 1918

Timothy P. Healy, served New York County from 1913 to 1918

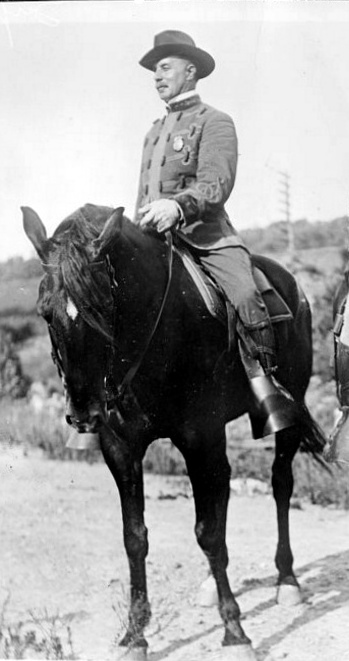
Dr. George F. Shrady, Jr. served as Coroner of New York County in 1906.

The Coroner of New York City issued death certificates and performed autopsies and inquests for New York County, New York, for all homicides, suicides and accidental deaths and any suspicious deaths.

The office served only Manhattan until 1891 when the city expanded. After the 1891 consolidation of New York City the office handled the outer boroughs, with each outer borough having two coroners. Coroners were elected at the same time as the Mayor of New York City for a term of four years and there was no requirement that the candidate had to be a physician. They could be removed from office by the Governor of New York.

If a coroner died in office, or was fired, or quits, someone was appointed to fill out their term. The coroners received a salary and also billed the city for services rendered for each autopsy and inquest.

By 1896 the Manhattan coroner was earning $6,000 per year, and in 1897 each inquest was billed at $8.50.

In 1915 a law was passed to abolished the office on January 1, 1918. It was replaced with the Office of Chief Medical Examiner of the City of New York. The medical examiner was to be a physician and no longer had the ability to hold inquests, which became the responsibility of the district attorney. Between 1898 when the city was consolidated and 1915 when the office went from coroner to medical examiner, 65 coroners had served in the position. Of them, nineteen were physicians, eight were undertakers, seven were politicians, six were real estate agents, two were saloon keepers, two were plumbers, one was a musician, one was a dentist, and one was a butcher.

== Laws ==
The New York statute of 1847 describes the Coroner's duties:

Whenever any coroner shall receive notice that any person has been slain, or has suddenly died, or has been dangerously wounded, or has been found dead under such circumstances as to require an inquisition, it shall be the duty of such Coroner to go to the place where such person shall be, and forthwith to summon a jury.

The laws covering deaths in New York City in 1865 was as follows:

The machinery of the law of New-York City about Coroners' inquests is arranged to take advantage of the insular situation of New-York. That is: First, it prohibits interments within the city, except in certain specified cases. Second, it prohibits anyone from conveying out of the city the body of anyone who has died within it, except under a permit from the City Inspector. Third, it directs the Inspector to grant such permit on receipt of a proper certificate, either from the Coroner or from the physician who attended the deceased; or if there was none, from some one of the family. Fourth, it specifies that the physician who makes such a certificate shall, among other things, specify 'the direct and indirect cause of the death of such person;' and that if the Coroner holds an inquest, he shall do the same in his certificate.

The Government of the City of New York official guide written by the New York City Commissioner of Accounts in 1917 describes the office as follows:

There are eleven Coroners in the City of New York — four for the Borough of Manhattan, two for The Bronx, two for Brooklyn, two for Queens and one for Richmond. The Coroners in each borough, except Richmond, constitute a Board of Coroners for the borough. Coroners are elected at the same time as the Mayor for a term of four years. They may be removed on charges by the Governor. The Coroner has jurisdiction over all homicide, suicide and accidental death cases and over all suspicious deaths, deaths in prison, and cases where the deceased was unattended by a physician. In cases of serious wounding the Coroner has jurisdiction to take an ante-mortem statement. The functions of the Coroner are threefold — medical investigation to determine the scientific cause of death, legal investigation to determine who caused the death, and judicial power to sit as a magistrate in homicide cases. The law requires the Coroner to summon a jury in cases where there is reasonable ground to believe that a homicide has been committed, and he may order the arrest of suspected persons. Each Coroner has a coroner's physician to assist him in medical investigations. He may subpoena witnesses and has power to order an autopsy and issues death certificates, upon which the Health Department grants burial permits. A law passed in 1915 provides for the abolishment of the office of Coroner on January 1, 1918, and the substitution of a Chief Medical Examiner for the entire city, with assistant medical examiners. The work of legal investigation is to be assumed by the District Attorneys, and the coroner's judicial function is to be performed by the City Magistrates.

== History ==
Originally New York City had two elected coroners. Each coroner was assigned a physician and a clerk. In 1852 the number of coroners were doubled to four.

In 1896 Theodore Knapp Tuthill suggested doubling the number of New York County, New York, coroners from four to eight, and increasing the compensation for the coroners to attract more competent officials.

In 1898 New York City expanded from Manhattan to include Queens, Staten Island, Brooklyn, and The Bronx.

In 1903 senator Nathaniel A. Elsberg sought to abolish the office and set up a new one based on the medical examiner model used in Massachusetts. Each medical examiner would be appointed to a five-year term. The coroner would no longer have police power and judicial power. That role would be taken over by the New York County District Attorney and the Criminal Court of the City of New York.

By 1914-1915 there were eleven coroners serving the five boroughs of New York City with a budget of $170,000.

On January 1, 1918, the office was abolished and replaced with the Office of Chief Medical Examiner of the City of New York. Charles Norris (1867–1935) was the first non acting chief medical examiner in the newly established Office of Chief Medical Examiner of the City of New York.

== New York County ==
Manhattan, New York City, had two coroners serving simultaneously until 1852, and four coroners after 1852. The aggregate of the coroners is called the Board of Coroners and is headed by the President of the Board of Coroners. The salary was $6,000 (approximately $232,000 today) in 1898.

- John Burnet 1748 to 1758.
- Thomas Shreve c. 1769 – c. 1771.
- Seth Geer, M.D. (?–1866) c. 1852. He had a stroke in 1851. "We regret to be called upon, to record severe and painful attack of paralysis to our worthy Coroner, Dr. Seth Geer, who was suddenly prostrated on Tuesday night at his residence in the Fourth-avenue, by a paralytic stroke, which we learn, has entirely disabled him of the power and muscular motion of his right arm and right leg." He resigned in 1852. He died on October 15, 1866, in Chatham, New Jersey.
- O'Donnell c. 1854.
- Robert Gamble 1854 to 1859 and 1865 to 1869. "Robert Gamble has been chosen President, and coroner William C. Gover as secretary of the Board of Coroners for the ensuing three years in 1865".
- Nugent c. 1857.
- Louis Naumann, M.D. (1825–1888) c. 1862.
- Collin c. 1865.
- Robert Gamble 1865 to 1869.
- John Wildey (1823–1889) c. 1865. "Ex-Coroner John Wildey, who died in Bellevue Hospital on Wednesday, was buried yesterday. He died in poverty. He had made plenty of money, but long ago lost the last of his fortune. He was an old fireman, having joined Engine Company No. 11 as far back as ..." He died in poverty at Bellevue Hospital on May 29, 1889, and was buried on May 31, 1889.
- William C. Gover (1815–1891) 1865 to 1871. He was born in 1851 in Philadelphia. He died on December 14, 1891, in Manhattan, New York City.
- Aaron B. Rollins (1818–1878) 1867 to 1871.
- Cornelius Flynn c. 1870.
- Patrick H. Keenan (1837–1907) c. 1870. He died on May 5, 1907, in Manhattan. "City Chamberlain Patrick Keenan, who died on Sunday evening, was buried yesterday in Calvary Cemetery."
- William G. Schirmer, M.D. (1810–1878) 1868 to 1870. He was born in Cassell, Germany in 1810. He studied medicine in Heidelberg, Germany. He migrated to the United States around 1838. He died at his homein Greenwich, Connecticut on July 8, 1878.
- Richard Croker (1843–1922) 1873 to 1876.
- Poltman c. 1874.
- Anthony Eickhoff (1827–1901) 1874 to 1876.
- Moritz Ellinger (1830–1907) 1876 to 1881
- Dempsey c. 1879.
- William H. Kennedy (1837–1892), undertaker, 1882 to 1885. He was born in Ireland in 1837. Death of ex-Coroner Kennedy. He lived at 1076 Lexington Avenue. He died on September 17, 1892, at his home in Manhattan.
- Ferdinand Eidman (1843–1910), 1885 to 1889. He was born in 1843 in Worms, Germany. He died on May 5, 1910, in Manhattan.
- Ferdinand Levy c. 1892.
- William O'Meagher, M.D. (1829–1896) 1894 to 1896. He died in office before he could complete his four-year term.
- Michael J. B. Messemer, M.D. (1851–1894) 1883 to 1894. He died in office.
- Theodore Knapp Tuthill, M.D. (1848–1926) 1896 to 1898. He was born on January 22, 1848, in Orange County, New York. He graduated from New York University College of Medicine in 1890. He died on October 25, 1926, at the Lutheran Hospital in Manhattan.
- Emil William Hoeber (1833–1906) 1896 to 1898. He was born in 1833 in Germany and immigrated to the United States in 1853. He married Jenny Heidelsheimer on October 28, 1875, in Manhattan, New York City. He died on October 5, 1906, in Manhattan, New York City.
- William H. Dobbs, 1894 to 1898. Elected in 1894.
- Edward T. Fitzpatrick, 1894 to 1901. He was the president of the Manhattan Board of Coroners under the administration of William L. Strong. His salary was $6,000 in 1898.
- Jacob E. Bausch (1868–1932), 1898 to 1902. He was born on October 5, 1867, in Manhattan. His salary was $6,000 in 1898. His coroner's physician was Philip F. O'Hanlon. He switched allegiance from Tammany Hall to the Fusion ticket in 1911. He died on May 21, 1932, in Brooklyn, New York City.
- Edward W. Hart, 1898 to 1901. His salary was $6,000 in 1898.
- Antonio Zucca (1851–1922), 1898 to 1901. He was born in 1851 in Trieste. His salary was $6,000 in 1898. He died on 14 April 1922 in Manhattan.
- Nicholas T. Brown 1902 to 1905. Elected in 1901 on the Fusion ticket.
- Solomon Goldenkranz, M.D. (1868–1937), 1902 to 1905. He was born in 1868. He attended New York University Medical School. He died in 1937. Elected in 1901 on the Fusion ticket.
- Gustav Scholer, M.D. (1851–1928), 1902 to 1905. He was born on June 25, 1851, in Germany to Jacob Scholer and Henrietta Foerster. He migrated to the United States in 1865 and became a citizen in 1872. He was a graduate of New York University Medical School in 1885. He became the chief of the surgical department of the West Side Dispensary. He was a Republican. He was coroner during the General Slocum disaster, the largest loss of life in an accident in New York City at the time. He died on December 1, 1928, in Manhattan. He was buried in Woodlawn Cemetery. His papers are archived at the New York Public Library.
- Moses J. Jackson, M.D. (1848–1918) 1902 to 1905. He was born in 1848. A physician and member of the Republican, he was elected in 1901. He was convicted of bribery in 1905. He died on January 1, 1918, in Manhattan.
- Peter P. Acritelli (1873–1912), 1905 to 1907. He was born on January 18, 1873, in Italy to Francesco Acritelli and Santa Maringelo. He was elected as coroner in 1905. He was indicted on two counts in connection with an illegal registration. He was charged with a felony and a misdemeanor in 1907. He survived the indictment and ran again for coroner and was defeated. He died on March 3, 1912.
- George Frederick Shrady, Jr., M.D. (1862–1933), 1905–1910.
- Peter Dooley, 1905–1910. Was elected on the Tammany Hall ticket in 1905. Replaced on the ticket in 1909 by Edward T. McCrystal.
- Julius Harburger (1851–1914), 1905–1910. Elected on the Tammany Hall ticket with Shrady, Acritelli, and Dooley. He investigated the deaths of Albert J. Adams, James E. Pepper, Charles T. Barney, Theodore Allen, and Elsie Sigel. Elected Sheriff of New York County in 1911.
- Israel Lewis Feinberg, M.D. (1872 - April 13, 1941), 1910 to 1918. He was a physician and the President of the Manhattan Board of Coroners from 1910 to 1918.
- Henry W. Holzhauser, 1910–1914. Investigated the Triangle Shirtwaist Factory fire.
- Herman Hellenstein, M.D. (1863–1920), 1910 to 1917. He was born in 1863 in Hungary. He died December 20, 1920, at Mount Sinai Hospital. He was 57 years old.
- James Edward Winterbottom (1880–1933), 1910–1913. He was born on July 6, 1880. He worked as an undertaker. He died on November 13, 1933.
- Timothy P. Healy (1863–1930), 1913 to 1918. He was one of the last four coroners of New York County, New York when the office was abolished in 1918.
- Patrick Riordan, M.D. (1868–1923), 1914 to 1918. He was one of the last four coroners of New York County, New York when the office was abolished in 1918, and he was the first acting medical examiner for the new Office of Chief Medical Examiner of the City of New York. He filled the office for one month until Charles Norris was appointed as the first full time medical examiner. He collapsed in the doorway of Louis Cohen's drug store, at 1203 Lexington Avenue in Manhattan and died on September 21, 1923.

== Queens County ==
Two coroners serving simultaneously for Queens, New York City

- Edward Stevens, c. 1685.
- Ackerman, c. 1879.
- William J. Bartlett was elected a coroner for a term of three years starting on January 1, 1897.
- Philip Thomas Cronin (1858–1905), c. 1898. He was born in 1858. His salary was $4,000 in 1898. He died on May 16, 1905, and was buried in Lawrence Family Graveyard.
- Samuel S. Guy, Jr., dentist, c. 1898. His salary was $4,000 in 1898. He murdered his wife in 1907 after she slapped him; he served 7 years in prison. "Dr. Samuel S. Guy, a prominent dentist of Far Rockaway, Queens, of which borough he was Coroner for four years, shot and instantly killed his wife, Lillian M. Guy, in the dining room of their home at Mott Avenue and Sheridan Boulevard, Far Rockaway, about 6 o'clock last evening."
- Leonard Ruoff, Jr. (1848–1907) c. 1898. He was an undertaker. His salary was $4,000 in 1898. "Leonard Ruoff, Jr., Ozone Park, N.Y., has purchased what is claimed to be the first motor undertaker's wagon. It is an electric machine, designed to carry a load of 1,000 pounds". He died on October 31, 1907 at age 59.
- Samuel Davidson Nutt, M.D. (1865–1928) 1906 to 1910. He was born on June 24, 1865 in New York City to Joseph D. Nutt and Celia Florinda Upham. In 1886, he graduated from Bellevue Hospital Medical School. He became the coroner in 1906. Charles Evans Hughes attempted to remove Samuel D. Nutt as coroner of Queens County, New York, in 1908. Nutt took $94 from the body of A.R. Von Der Zweep, who was killed by the cars on the Long Island Rail Road at Valley Stream, New York. He was exonerated, he testified that he had locked the money in his safe to protect it, and became ill and forgot to list it in the inventory. He served as coroner until 1910. He died on May 3, 1928, in Woodhaven, New York.
- Dunn, c. 1913.
- Carl Voegel (1869–1955), 1913 to 1918. "When the Board of Elections was created in 1901, Mr. Voegel was named chief clerk in Queens. In 1913 he served as [coroner]". He was a Democrat. He was one of the last two coroners of Queens County, New York.
- Daniel M. Ebert, 1913 to 1918. He was a Democrat. He was one of the last two coroners of Queens County, New York.

== Bronx County ==
Two coroners served simultaneously for The Bronx, New York City

- Anthony McOwen (1842–1920) c. 1898. His salary was $6,000 in 1898. He died on October 29, 1920 in Manhattan. He was buried in Old Saint Raymonds Cemetery in the Bronx, New York City.
- James Robinson (1851–1921), He was the coroner for nine years, a process server with the Queens County District Attorney, and at the time of his death he was a Deputy Sheriff of Queens County, New York. He took his own life by stepping in front of on oncoming train in Manhattan on May 31, 1921 at the Wall Street Station.
- Thomas M. Lynch (1847–1922) c. 1898. His salary was $6,000 in 1898. He may have died on April 11, 1922 at age 75.
- Albert Frederick Schwannecke (1859–1912) 1909 to 1912. He was born in 1859 in Germany and migrated to the United States. In 1892 he was the Commissioner of Deeds for New York City. In 1909 he became Coroner of Bronx County, New York. In 1910 he was arrested on a charge of disorderly conduct for threatening a police officer while he was investigating a murder. He died on April 30, 1912, in Bronx, New York City, of a gastric hemorrhage after falling while on duty.
- Jerome F. Healy (1858–1925), 1913 to 1918. He died on December 30, 1925. He was one of the last two coroners of Bronx County, New York.
- William J. Flynn, 1913 to 1918. He was one of the last two coroners of Bronx County, New York.

== Kings County ==
Two coroners served simultaneously for Brooklyn, New York City. One served the eastern district and the other served the western district.

- Peter Johnson of Gueoos, c. 1685.
- Norris, c. 1862.
- Edward Henry Flavin, Sr. (1839–1911), c. 1869. He was born in Rockport, Illinois, in August 1839. He married Mary J. (1840–1908) had a son, Edward H. Flavin, Jr. (1865–1922). Edward H. Flavin, Sr. died on May 11, 1911, in Brooklyn.
- George Henry Lindsay (1837–1916), 1886 to 1892. He was born on January 7, 1837. He died on May 25, 1916. He was buried in Evergreen Cemetery.
- George Washington Lindsay (1865–1938), 1886 to 1892. He was born on March 28, 1865, to George Henry Lindsay. He was the deputy coroner from 1886 to 1892. He died on March 15, 1938.
- Edward Butler Coombs, dentist (1862–1910), 1896 to 1897. He was a dentist and in 1896 was elected as the coroner of Kings County, New York. In 1898 he was convicted of presenting a false and fraudulent bill for an inquest that he never performed. He was released from prison in 1900 after serving one year and seven months. "Ex-Coroner Edward B. Coombs was released from the Kings County Penitentiary yesterday afternoon, his term of imprisonment having expired. Coombs was not required to pay the fine of $1,000 which was imposed upon him when he was sentenced because of a legal flaw in the commitment." After his release he left the city.
- Joseph Marie Creamer II, M.D. (1852–1900), 1892 to 1896 in the eastern district. He was born in 1852. He was a Democrat. He died of pneumonia of February 23, 1900.
- George H. Nason (1852-?), 1896 to 1897 in the eastern district. He was born in Greenpoint, Brooklyn. He graduated from the University of the City of New York in 1874. He was an undertaker before elected as coroner. He and Coombs were indicted in 1897 for submitting fraudulent bills for inquests that never convened. He became an examining inspector for New York City and was removed from office on March 28, 1904.
- George Washington Delap, M.D. (1857–1901), 1897 to 1901 in the eastern district. His physician at the coroner's office was Alvin C. Hendersen (1849–1899). Delap died on September 14, 1901, and was buried in Calvary Cemetery.

== Richmond County ==
Two coroners served in some years, and in other years a single coroner served Staten Island.

- Frances Barber, c. 1685.
- John J. Van Rensselaer, M.D. 1879 to ?. He was appointed by the Governor of New York on July 4, 1879.
- Levy c. 1884.
- Charles Wilmot Townsend, M.D. (1867–1907), ? to 1897. He was born in December 1867. He died on January 7, 1907, when he was murdered in his home by John Bell. "Dr. Charles Wilmot Townsend, one of the best-known physicians on Staten Island, was shot in his home yesterday morning as he lay in bed with his wife on the second floor of their home, 5 Westervelt Avenue. He is now in the S.T. Smith Infirmary, and it is said there that he will probably die."
- William B. Wilkinson (1868–1935), 1897 to ?. He died on February 2, 1935, on Staten Island.
- John Seaver. He was paid $4,000 in 1898.
- George Charles Tranter (1851–1925). He was paid $4,000 in 1898. "George C. Tranter, 74 years old, one of the Democratic leaders of Staten island before its consolidation with New York City, died in his home." He died on 13 May 1925 on Staten Island.
- James Leonard Vail (1876–1941) 1913 to 1918. He was born on April 15, 1876. He died on March 13, 1941, at age 64. He was the last coroner of Richmond County, New York.
