= Shrady =

Shrady is a surname. Notable people with the surname include:

- Frederick Charles Shrady (1907–1990), American painter and sculptor
- George Frederick Shrady, Jr., (1862–1933), American police officer
- George Frederick Shrady, Sr. (1830–1907), American physician
- Henry Shrady (1871–1922), American sculptor
- Marina Shrady (1955-2024), American painter
- Maria Shrady (1924-2002), Austrian-American author
- Nicholas Shrady, American author
