= Zevin (disambiguation) =

Zevin is a municipality of Azerbaijan.

Zevin can also refer to:

- Gabrielle Zevin, American author and screenwriter
- Israel Joseph Zevin, Belarusian-American humorist
- Shlomo Yosef Zevin, Russian-Israeli rabbi and editor
- Yakov Zevin, Bolshevik activist
