= Michael J. B. Messemer =

American physician

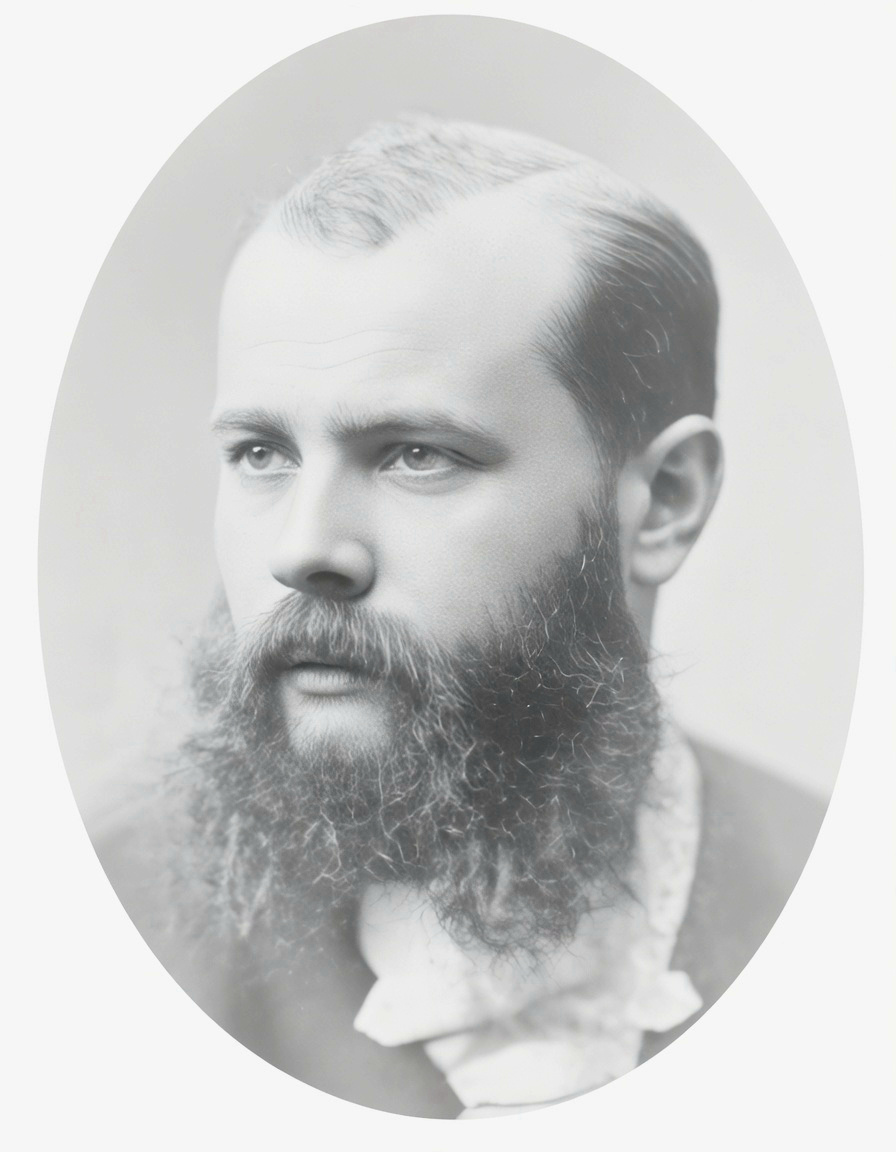
- M. J. B. Messemer (circa 1889)
- Born: Michael Jean Baptiste Messemer; March 30, 1851; New York City, New York
- Died: February 21, 1894 (aged 42); Mentone, France
- Occupations: physician, politician
- Known for: Coroner of New York County, New York; member, German Democrats; member, Tammany Hall
- Spouse: never married
- Parents: Francis Messemer (father); Gertrude Broschardt (mother)

Michael Jean Baptiste Messemer (March 30, 1851 - February 21, 1894) was an American physician. He served as the Coroner of New York County, New York. He was also active in politics as a member of the German Democrats and of Tammany Hall.

== Early life ==
Messemer was born March 30, 1851, in New York City to Francis Messemer (1830 - 1858), a language interpreter and Gertrude Broschardt (1830 - 1858). His father immigrated to New York City in 1848 from Schallodenbach, a small community located in the Pfalz region of Germany. At the age of seven, Messemer along with siblings Edward and Anna were orphaned when their parents and youngest sister Cecilia, perished in the sinking of the Hamburg-American Steamer 'Austria'. Messemer and his siblings were adopted by their paternal grandfather Peter Messemer (1798 - 1885), a tile manufacturer and former Mayor of Schallodenbach who moved to New York aged 50. Peter Messemer gained prominence as a leading real-estate holder and landlord in "kleindeutschland", the modern day East Village. The senior Messemer took an active role in city and state politics serving as secretary, treasure, and president of the German Democratic party in New York . The elder Messemer's early involvement in politics and the Tammany machine had a lasting effect on the younger Messemer. Messemer received a liberal classical education, graduating from St. Francis Xavier's College at the age of sixteen. He studied for two years at New York University School of Law, but left before completing his degree. Having given up the prospects of becoming an attorney, Messemer graduated from Bellevue Hospital Medical College in 1875 (now New York University School of Medicine).

== Medical career ==
Messemer served for fifteen years as physician of internal and nervous diseases at Mount Sinai Hospital, for ten years as surgeon of the 5th regiment of the N.G.S.N.Y. He began is tenure as Deputy Coroner and subsequently Coroner in 1883, elected on the Tammany ticket. He held the office of Coroner til his death, receiving a salary of $10,000 a year with a three-month vacation period. Messemer was a popular and strong advocate of medical reform and was a member of a number of medical societies. He served on several publication boards of the Medico-Legal Society pushing for mortuary reform. Messemer was also a life member of the New York Pathological Society, the Neurological Society, the Medical Society of the State of New York . He served from 1885 to 1886 as Health Commissioner of the city, was for nearly twenty years Medical Examiner in Lunacy of the State of New York, and Medical Jurisprudence of New York County. Messemer was the consulting physician of the Germany Dispensary (later Lenox Hill Hospital, the New York Eye and Ear Infirmary, Leaks and Watts Children Home, Roman Catholic Orphan Asylum, Half Orphan Asylum for Destitute and Abandoned Children, The Thalia Theater and Tammany Hall Messemer and his brother Dr. Edward Jean Messemer were active in medical education, regularly presiding over medical students residencies. Both brothers taught at medical schools in New York, Leeds, England, Paris and Montpellier, France, Marburg and Berlin, Germany. Messemer's most notable autopsy and inquest was of the 1885 death of railroad magnate William H. Vanderbilt, son and heir of the 'Commodore'.

== Political career ==
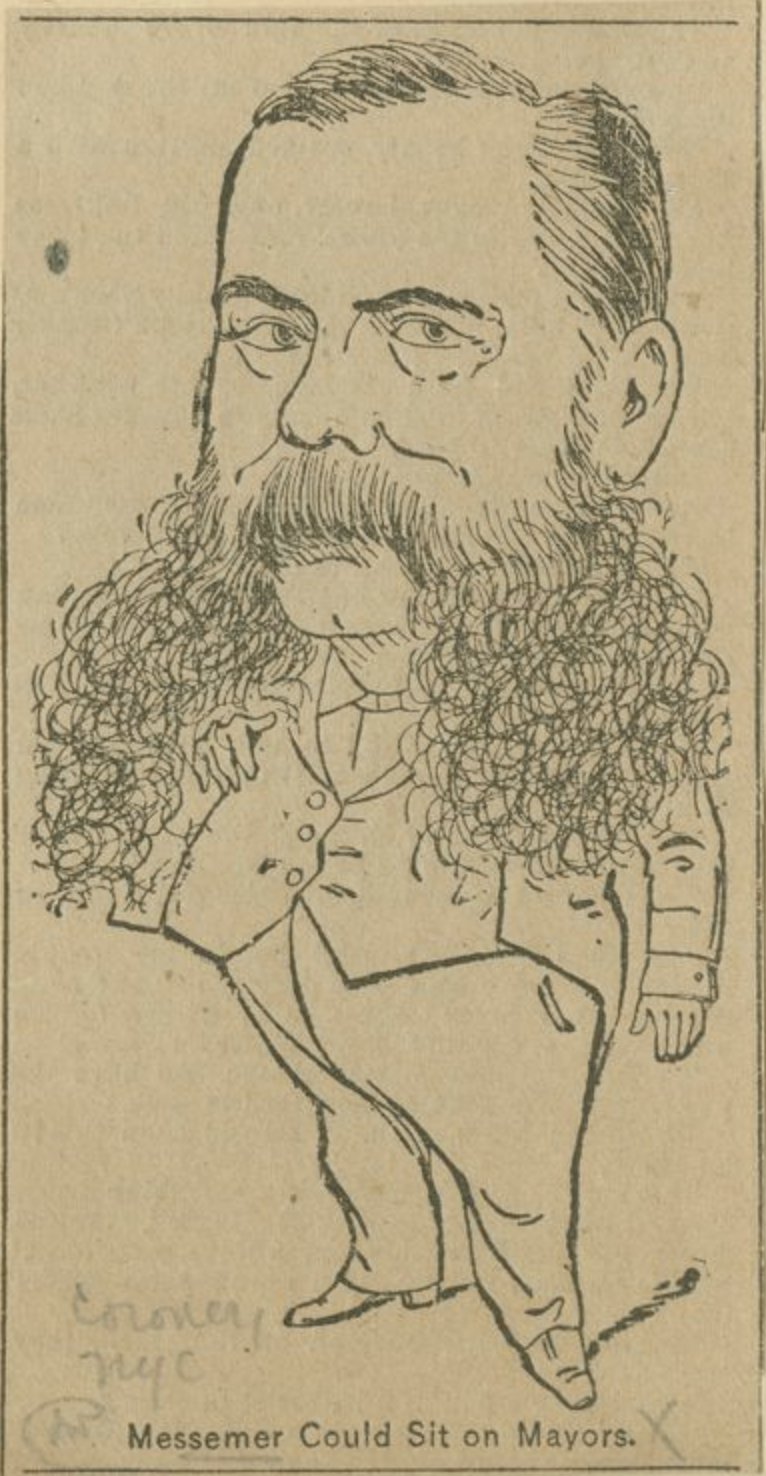
Coroner Messemer

Messemer's political ambitions began young, strongly influenced by his grandfathers involvement with the German community of New York and Tammany Hall. Messemer's intention for political position became evident upon the completion of his studies when he ran for City Coroner. His association representing the German community and medical professionals began in 1875. He would attempt to run on at least four occasions for the position of Mayor of New York, but was always defeated in early ballots by the Irish opposition of Tammany.

Messemer was often called upon as representative for the City of New York at events in Washington and to visiting dignitaries visiting the city. The most notable occasion being an evening cruise in honor of Prince Don Augusto of Brazil in which anarchists attempted to bomb the vessel in an act of terror. He was known throughout his career for being particularly savvy when it came to political campaigning among the various ethnic groups of New York. It was known among many that he utilized his command of nearly every language in the city and cheery disposition to engage a more personal audience with voters. A number of political satires at the time mocked Messemer's name in relation to his ability to address any audience with a verse;

Michael J. B. Messemer and M. J. B. Messemer to the natives, M. Jean Baptiste Messemer to the French, Mike Messemer to the Irish, Michel Johann B. Messemer to the Germans, Maccaroni J. B. Messemer to the Italians, and the most satirical, Montgomery Jacqueminot Bleached Messemer.

His tenure as Coroner is well documented in national newspapers, in part to the media sensationalism Messemer himself deployed. Between 1885 and 1894, his cases made headlines often with Messemer overstepping the bounds of his office. His tactics made enemies among his peers but influenced later generations of medical examiners and police agencies to employ science and reasoning to solve murder cases.

== Klein Scandal ==
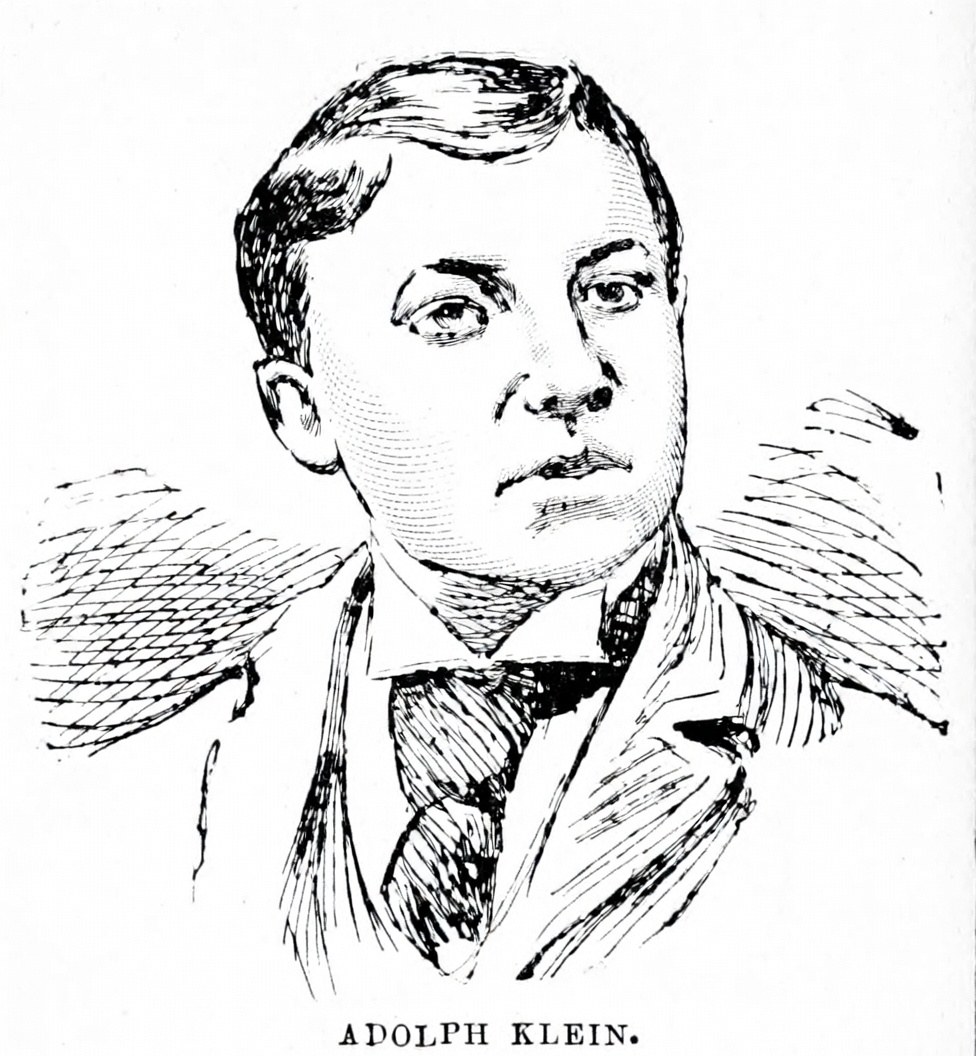

The last two years of Messemer's career were marred by the curious case of Adolph Klein. In July, 1891, Klein who was 16 years of age at the time disappeared. He had for more than a year worked as a messenger office boy for Messemer. For some weeks friends and family searched and made inquiries as to Klein's whereabouts to no avail. By 1892, the New York City Police Department began to investigate Klein's disappearance as a missing persons case. The investigation was performed for over a year with a great deal of secrecy because of the high profile status of the primary suspect and witness to the disappearance of Messemer. The investigation was mounted by Rev. Dr. Charles Henry Parkhurst under the approval of Charles N. Taintor as Police Justice. Parkhurst was an outspoken critic of political corruption and Tammany Hall, his association with the investigation was in part to provide transparency because of Messemer's close association with Tammany Hall.

The investigation found that Klein had disappeared shortly after Messemer and his brother had accused Klein of forging checks and withdrawing a "considerable amount of money" from the German National Bank. Klein's mother stated to investigators that her son had said he had been improperly treated for months by Messemer. The nature of this ‘improper’ treatment was never clarified though some Messemer’s opponents at the time gave that the subtext was physical or sexual in nature owing to Messemer’s bachelor status and Klein’s age. Taintor and Parkhurst interviewed numerous witnesses and found no evidence of either Messemer or Mrs. Klein having knowledge of Adolph Klein's disappearance. The investigators noted that Messemer was physically frail at the time of the disappearance with one arm in a sling. Messemer was suffering from the later stages of tuberculosis and unlikely to have had any nefarious involvement in Klein’s disappearance. The case was never investigated as a murder for a lack of physical evidence and investigators cleared Messemer affirming that he may have been the victim of theft, presuming Klein had left New York and changed his identity to disguise his crime. Despite this theory by investigators, Klein’s whereabouts were never determined and his mother and siblings never discovered what happened to him.

== Personal life and death ==
Messemer never married and devoted his life to his career and hobbies. Outside of his expansive medical practice, he was an active member of the Liederkranz Society and Arion Society, the two largest German musical societies in the country at that time. He was a member of the Press Club and frequently traveled to Washington where he participated in language competitions, a talent which he derived from his father who had been an interpreter. He traveled frequently and collected specimen from around the world. He was active in 19th century New York society as a regular fixture at social events in New York City as well as the Hudson Valley and Newport, Rhode Island.

For many years, his residence was a shared townhouse located at 144 Second Avenue with his brother Dr. Edward J, Messemer briefly at 150 Second Avenue with his grandfather and two of his uncles. He spent the last six months of his life traveling through the Southwest and Europe. He died at Mentone, France on February 21, 1894. Following his death his will was contested by a German woman, Charlotte von Keuhnau who attempted to withdraw several thousands dollars from a Rothschild bank in Germany. Messemer's brother Edward had an injunction filed and later was awarded the entirety of the estate.
