= New York Pathological Society =

Professional organization for pathologists

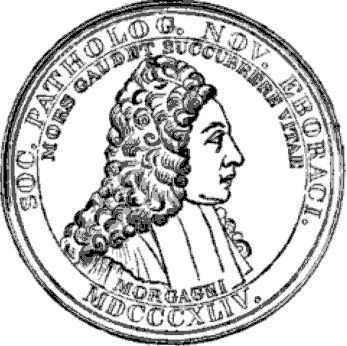
- 1894 seal displaying the society's name in Latin, "Societatis Pathologicae Novi Eboraci," its motto "Mors Gaudet Succubrere Vitae," and a portrait of Giovanni Battista Morgagni
- Formation: 1844 (Inc. 1886)
- Website: www.nypathsociety.org

The New York Pathological Society is a professional organization for pathologists in New York State. It was organized in 1844 and incorporated in 1886. In 1908, its membership was approximately 215. It published the journal Proceedings of the New York Pathological Society at various times from 1875 until 1955.

== Presidents of the Society ==
The first president of the society was Dr. John A. Swett in 1844. Other notable presidents include James R. Wood (1848, 1857), William H. Van Buren (1850), Edmund Randolph Peaslee (1858), John C. Dalton (1859), Alfred C. Post (1861), Abraham Jacobi (1864), Gurdon Buck (1865), Lewis Albert Sayre (1869), Alfred L. Loomis (1871, 1872), Hermann Knapp (1874), Francis Delafield (1875), Edward G. Janeway (1877), Edward L. Keyes (1879), George Frederick Shrady, Sr. (1883, 1884), John A. Wyeth (1885, 1886), T. Mitchell Prudden (1887), Hermann Biggs (1891), William H. Park (1903), James Ewing (1921), and Virginia Kneeland Frantz (1949, 1950).
