= Israel Jacobson =

German-Jewish philanthropist and communal organiser (1768–1828)

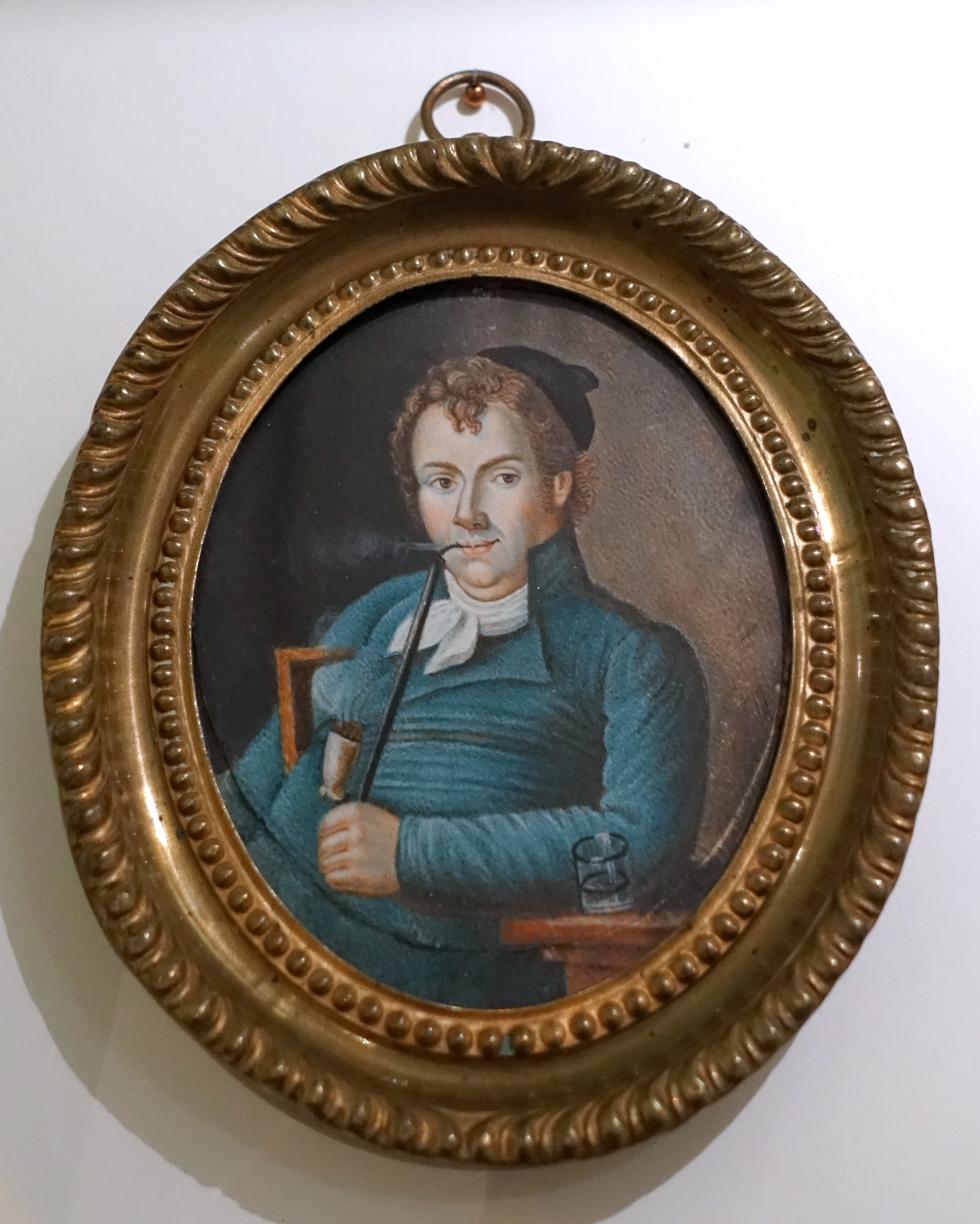
- Born: 17 October 1768; Halberstadt
- Died: 14 September 1828 (aged 59); Berlin
- Occupations: Philanthropist, communal organizer
- Known for: Pioneering Jewish reform, education, and social change

Israel Jacobson (Hebrew: ישראל יעקבסון) (17 October 1768, Halberstadt – 14 September 1828, Berlin) was a German-Jewish philanthropist and communal organiser. Jacobson pioneered political, educational and religious reforms in the early days of Jewish emancipation, and while he lacked a systematic religious approach, he is also considered one of the heralds of Reform Judaism.

== Origins ==
The only son of wealthy businessman and philanthropist Israel Jacob, Jacobson's parents lived modestly yet contributed considerably to reducing the community debt. Owing to the very low level of efficiency of the Halberstadt public schools, Israel attended mainly the Jewish religious school, in his leisure hours studying German literature and the works of Gotthold Ephraim Lessing and Moses Mendelssohn on his own account. His level of understanding of rabbinic literature and Hebrew led professors at the University of Helmstedt, where he was eventually granted a degree, to declare that Jacobson was a Hebrew scholar.

At the age of eighteen, after having accumulated a small fortune, he married Mink Samson, the daughter of respected financier Herz Samson and granddaughter of Philip Samson, founder of the Samson-Schule at Wolfenbüttel, at which Leopold Zunz and Isaak Markus Jost were educated. Through the Samson family, Jacobson became friends with Charles William Ferdinand, Duke of Brunswick and Lunenburg, Prince of Wolfenbüttel, favorite nephew of Frederick II of Prussia. Jacobson took up his residence in Brunswick and, possessing great financial ability, rapidly increased his fortune. It was through Jacobson's influence and persuasion that in 1803 the so-called "Leibzoll" (poll-tax), then levied from Jews in many German states, was abolished in the ducal Brunswick-Lunenburgian Principality of Wolfenbüttel.

Developing a belief in egalitarian and religious pluralism in education, he established (1801) in Seesen, near the Harz Mountains, a school in which forty children of Jewish parents and twenty children of Christian parents were to be educated together, receiving free board and lodging. This close association of children of different creeds was a favorite idea of his. The Jacobson school soon obtained a wide reputation, and hundreds of pupils from neighboring places were educated there.

== Accomplishments ==
In 1810 he built a synagogue in the school grounds and showed his sympathies for reforming ritual by adding hymns in German that were sung by a choir of boys, and prayers in German were added to those in Hebrew and Aramaic. He also had a pipe organ installed. When, under Napoleon's rule, the Kingdom of Westphalia was created, and the emperor's brother Jérôme Bonaparte was placed at its head, Jacobson, who had removed to the residence of the king at Cassel, was appointed president of the Jewish consistory (Royal Westphalian Consistory of the Israelites), established on 3 March 1808.

Jacobson's innovations were quite restrained, and his mode of thought was still within a traditional framework. He justified himself on conventional halachic grounds, later enlisting scholars to write responsa in favour of his worship style. His role in the introduction of these early reforms made him a founding figure in the eyes of some partisans of Reform Judaism, but Michael A. Meyer noted that he lacked either a comprehensive approach or a sense of principled critique. His religious worldview, according to Meyer, did not stray beyond that of late maskilim; he "was not a conscious Reformer", interested in modifying religious mechanisms themselves, only exteriors. While his associates, mainly Eduard Kley, would later publish the first unequivocal Reform liturgy in 1818, effecting a concerted Orthodox backlash, the Westphalian Consistory's aroused little ire at their time. Its reforms were adopted by German neo-Orthodoxy, and Rabbi Samson Raphael Hirsch "integrated fully into his worldview the program of the moderate Haskalah and even the aesthetic reforms of the Westphalian consistory."

After the Duchy of Mecklenburg-Schwerin emancipated its Jewish subjects in 1813, Jacobson bought in that duchy two feudal manor estates, Klenz and Gehmkendorf and the peasant village Klein Markow (all three are components of today's Jördenstorf). In 1816 he swore his oath of fealty to Frederick Francis I, Grand Duke of Mecklenburg-Schwerin, thus becoming the first Jew with a permanent seat and vote in the Estates of the Realm of a German state. As feudal lord he also held the patrimonial jurisdiction over his vassal peasants and the patronage of the pertaining Lutheran churches, which he conveyed to a Lutheran confidant. In 1817 he further acquired the neighbouring estates of Grambow and Tressow. His life and work, especially this part, is commemorated—among other things—in the permanent exhibition on Mecklenburg's Jewish history in the museum Engelscher Hof and the half-timbered former synagogue in Röbel, 66 km south of Jördenstorf.

After Napoleon's fall (1815) Jacobson moved to Berlin, where he opened in his own house a hall for worship The Prussian government, remembering the French sympathies of Jacobson, and receiving continued complaints from the Orthodox rabbis, ordered the services at Jacobson's house discontinued.

His grave is in the Jewish cemetery on Schönhauser Allee in Berlin.
