= George Frederick Shrady Sr. =

American physician and medical journal editor (1830–1907)

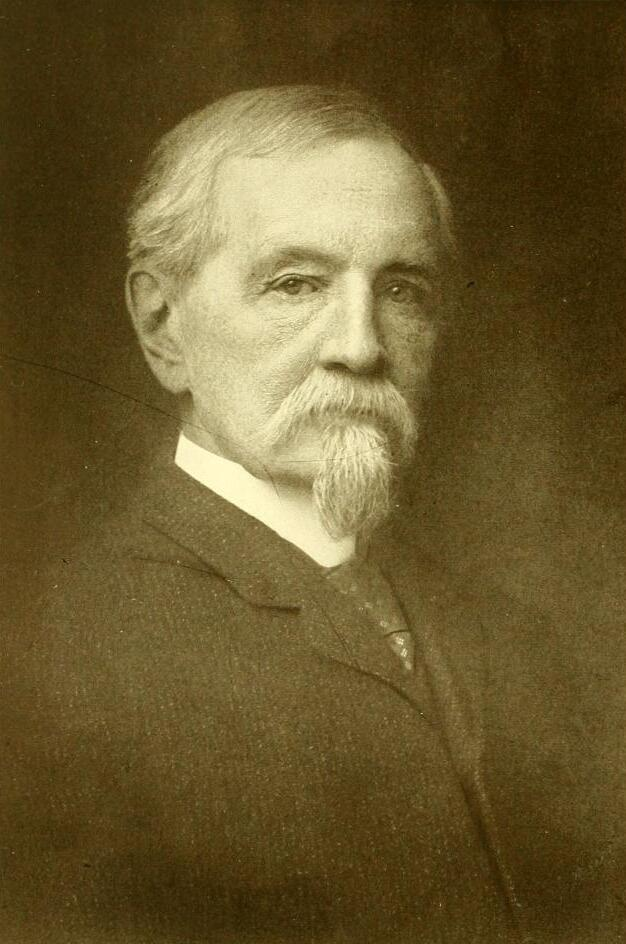
- Shrady circa 1880
- Born: January 13, 1830; New York City, US
- Died: November 30, 1907 (aged 77); New York City, US
- Occupations: Author, Doctor
- Spouses: Mary Lewis; Hester Ellen Cantine
- Children: George Frederick Shrady Jr., Henry Merwin Shrady, Charles Douglas Shrady, and Minnie Shrady (Mrs. John F. Ambrose)

George Frederick Shrady Sr. (January 13, 1830 – November 30, 1907) was an American physician active in the late 19th century.

== Early life and education ==
He was born in New York City on January 13, 1830, to Margaret Beinhauer and John Shrady. He was one of five children, all were born at No. 138 Rivington Street, now part of Central Park. His paternal grandfather emigrated from Baden-Baden, Germany, and settled in New York City in 1735. Both of his grandfathers were soldiers in the American Revolutionary War, and his father served in the War of 1812.

His early education was received in the public and private schools of New York City, and subsequently he pursued an academic course at the Free Academy, now the College of the City of New York. From this institution he entered the College of Physicians and Surgeons in this city, from which he was graduated with the degree of Doctor of Medicine in 1858. His proficiency in anatomy brought him the same year at Bellevue Hospital the Wood intercollegiate prize. During 1857 and 1858 he was resident surgeon in the New York Hospital, and was graduated from the surgical division of that institution in 1859. He then entered practice in this city.

== Medical career ==
In the capacity of assistant surgeon in the United States Army, Dr. Shrady was assigned to duty during the Civil War at the Central Park Hospital, New York, but later was detailed to field duty on the operating corps. At the close of the war he returned to private practice and quickly acquired a prominent place in the surgical profession. It was through his attendance on President Grant during the latter's last illness that Dr. Shrady first sprang into national fame. While Grant, the public idol, lay ill, an entire nation hung on the words of Dr. Shrady. His skill went far toward alleviating Grant's sufferings at the close of his illness. Afterward, when Emperor Frederick was seized with an ailment similar to that of which President Grant had died, Sir Morell Mackenzie, the famous English specialist in throat diseases, who was attending the Emperor, kept in communication by cable with Dr. Shrady for purposes of consultation, and imparted to the latter each change of symptom as it occurred.

After President Garfield had been shot, Dr. Shrady was called into consultation by Dr. Bliss as a surgical pathologist, and later made a report to the profession and the public, in behalf of the staff, touching the results of the autopsy. He took part in the autopsy on the body of the assassin Guiteau, and aided materially in settling several points that had been raised as to the sanity of Guiteau when he shot President Garfield. In 1890, when Kemmler was electrocuted, the first murderer to receive capital punishment by this method, Dr. Shrady was one of the medical experts appointed to witness the execution. His observations led him to condemn electrocution unqualifiedly.

Dr. Shrady's activities were great and varied. He was visiting surgeon to St. Francis Hospital for twenty years, and was consulting surgeon there for over six years past. He served in a similar consulting capacity at the New York Cancer Hospital, the Hospital for the Ruptured and Crippled, the Columbus Hospital, the Fordham Home for Incurables, the General Memorial Hospital, the Red Cross Hospital, and the Vassar Brothers Medical Center at Poughkeepsie, New York, and as family surgeon to the Presbyterian Hospital in New York City. Also he was physician-in-chief to the hospitals of the New York Health Department and one of the managers of the Hudson State Hospital for the Insane. From 1861 to 1879 Dr. Shrady was secretary of the New York Pathological Society, and president of that organization in 1883–84. He was president of the Practitioners' Society of New York and of the American Medical Editors' Association. Other positions held by him were the trusteeship of the Hudson State Hospital for the Insane at Poughkeepsie, fellow of the American and New York Academies of Medicine, member of the New York State Medical Society and various other scientific and professional organizations.

While enjoying high distinction as an authority on subject relating to general surgery, and having a large practice, Dr. Shrady took special pride in his editorial work. This work he began early in his professional career, editing the "American Medical Times" from 1860 to 1864. Two years later he founded the "Medical Record" and remained its editor-in-chief for thirty-nine years. He was the author of "Pine Ridge Papers," a series of satirical and witty treatises on charlatanism among medical practitioners. His contributions on surgery to magazines of both popular and medical character constitute a valuable addition to the literature of the profession. For many years he was a member of the editorial staff of the "New York Herald," directing his attention especially to the treatment of those subjects that fell within the sphere of his profession. He was the foremost advocate in his writings of the freedom of consultation between members of different legally recognized schools of medicine, and was largely instrumental in reconciling merely doctrinal differences in medical practice.

He was also an earnest advocate of the extension of clinical instruction, the establishment of state examinations for the license to practice medicine, the advancement of the standard of professional education by increase of curriculum, and many other measures, all of which had for object the elevation of the profession and the benefit of mankind. In recognition of his distinguished accomplishments and services the degree of master of arts was conferred on him by Yale University in 1869.

== Personal ==
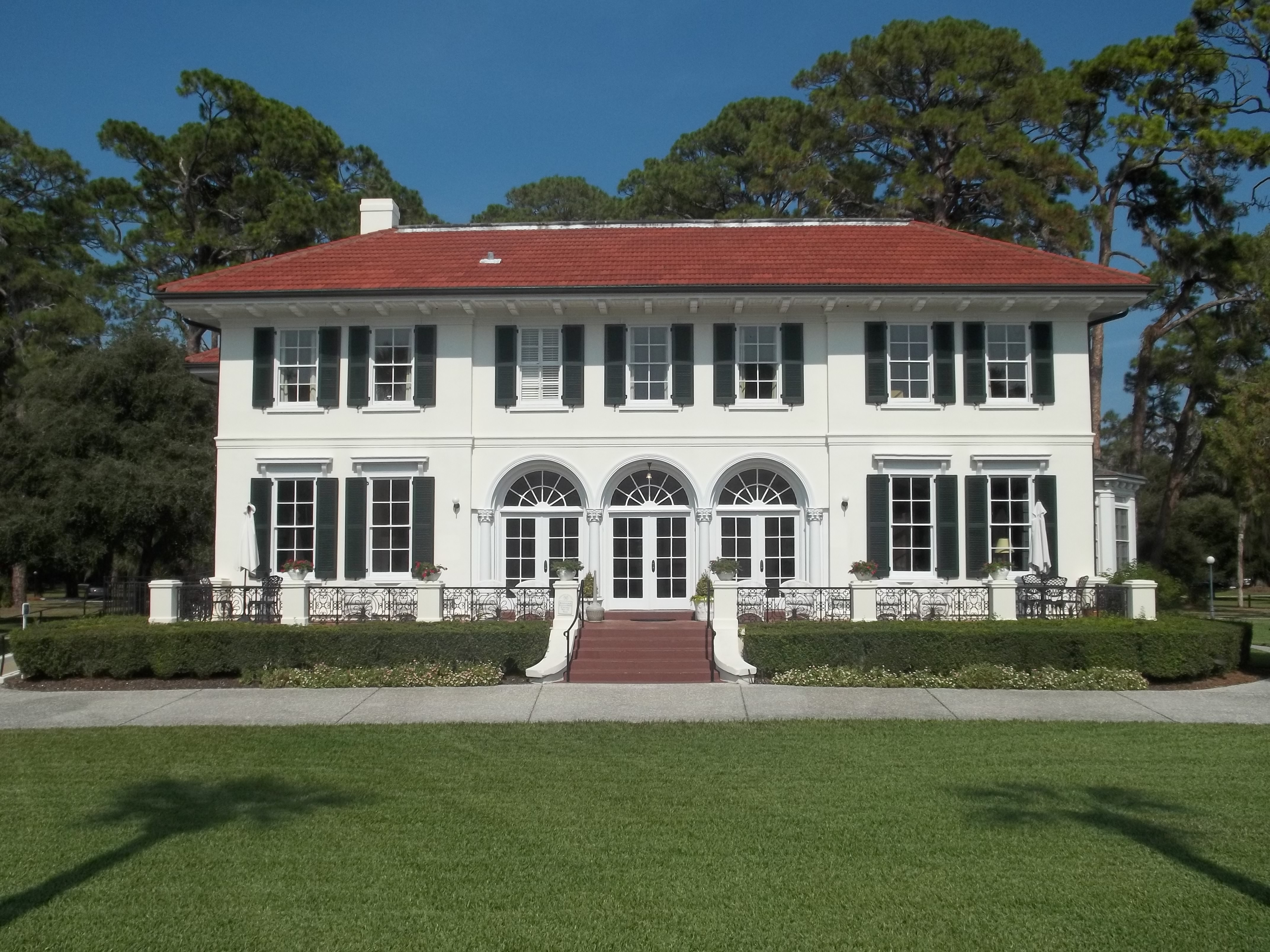
Cherokee Cottage (1904), Jekyll Island Club, Jekyll Island, Georgia

On December 19, 1860, Dr. Shrady married Mary Lewis (1842-1883) of New York, and they had four children: George Frederick Shrady Jr. (1861-1933), Minnie E. Shrady (1864-1933), Henry Merwin Shrady (1871-1922), and Charles Douglas Shrady (1873-1954). Son George Jr. married Katharine Wolfe Ambrose, daughter of the civil engineer John Wolfe Ambrose. Daughter Minnie married Katharine Wolfe Ambrose's brother, John Fremont Ambrose, superintendent of New York City's Department of Docks and Ferries. Son Henry became a prominent sculptor, and is best known for the Grant Memorial on the National Mall.

Mary Lewis Shrady died on April 29, 1883, and was buried at Woodlawn Cemetery, Bronx, New York. On December 19, 1888, Dr. Shrady married his second wife, Hester Ellen Cantine (1850-1916), of New York, a widow with one daughter, Sarah Cantine Shrady, née Shultis, who married Edwin Gould. The Shradys were members of the Jekyll Island Club (a.k.a. The Millionaires Club), on Jekyll Island, Georgia, as was the Gould family. They built Cherokee Cottage, there, in 1904.

Dr. Shrady died November 30, 1907, at 9:30 p.m., at his residence at 512 Fifth Avenue in Manhattan. He was buried at Saint Paul's Chapel and Churchyard in Manhattan. His body was later moved and re-interred, alongside his first wife, Mary, and son Charles, along with several other Shrady relations, at Woodlawn Cemetery, in Bronx, New York.

=== Appley estate ===
In 1910, the Shrady Family successfully claimed two-thirds of the Appley estate (worth nearly $1 million at the time of the settlement), finally resolving a legal battle that was initiated in the 1860s. They fought for this money even though the Appley heirs relied on it for support while they themselves were wealthy and successful. The founder of the estate was Jacob Appley, the son of a German immigrant. He started out as a butcher working at a stall in the Oswego Market on Broadway. But his fortunes were greatly elevated by a windfall from a shrewd investment in the mutton market which he made in the early 1800s. He expanded his fortune by investing in properties around the Lower East Side on Eldridge, Delancey, Forsyth, Bayard, and First Streets. When he died in 1840, he left the estate, which included about 40 houses, in trust to his only son, Jacob Alexander Appley (Jacob A). The trust document, one of the earliest of its kind, provided Jacob A with the income from the estate for life and saved the properties to be distributed to Jacob A's issue (children) after his death. In case no issue existed, the trust named Jacob's sister, Barbara (Shrady), and her heirs, as the beneficiaries. As one of Barbara's grandsons, Dr. George Frederick Shrady was a potential beneficiary.

Jacob A Appley had many children with at least 3 women, but none of them were legitimate, which, as the Shrady position maintained, disqualified them from being legal beneficiaries (under the laws in effect at the time). At the age of 25, Jacob A had married 16-year-old Mary Brown, and although she deserted him after a short time, they were never legally divorced. For 20 years after acquiring the estate, Jacob A acted as the trustee, and with full control of the properties, he freely funded an extravagant lifestyle and financed several business ventures. Then in the 1860s, the Shradys became aware of Jacob A’s unresolved marriage to Mary Brown. They allied with Mary providing her with support so that she would deny Jacob A a legal divorce and prevent him from having legitimate heirs. Control of the estate was transferred to an independent trustee and Jacob A was restricted to an allowance to preserve the principal until his death. Jacob A prevailed, at least partially, by living on for another 50 years continuing to receive income from the properties while they were left unimproved remaining like time capsules for 100 years. Jacob A was 91 when he finally died in 1906 and had outlasted a generation of the Shradys. When Mary Brown died in 1899, he finally was able to legally marry his common law wife Mary Jane Rockefeller (Rockefellow) thereby granting some legitimate status to their 11 children. The ceremony was performed by the Chief Justice of the New York Supreme Court. (She was a third cousin of John D.) Furthermore, his attorneys pushed through a state law making children legitimate if subsequent to their birth, the parents become legally married. However, the law did not clearly apply to children already born at the time the law was passed. Consequently, the Appley children from Mary Jane Rockefeller were compelled to give up two thirds of the estate to their distant cousins. Appley’s children from other women were excluded from any inheritance.

== Legacy ==
The Century Illustrated Monthly Magazine noted that:

"Few men are so sincerely mourned or by such a wide circle of friends, personal and professional, as is Dr. Shrady. For nearly half a century he was a conspicuous figure in his chosen profession, and during his whole career he was ever active to help the unfortunate, to advise and assist the young practitioner, and in all efforts to raise the standard of medical education and ethics. Simple, unaffected, courteous, and with a heart brimming over with kindness, he won the warm affection of all with whom he came in contact. Among the sincerest mourners at his bier are the poor, to whom he gave his best services without hope of fee or reward."

This article incorporates text from the 1908 book General Grant's Last Days; with a Short Biographical Sketch of Dr. Shrady, a work now in the public domain. Feel free to alter the text but please maintain the proper citations to that work.
