= Israel Lewis Feinberg =

Coroner of New York County (1872–1941)

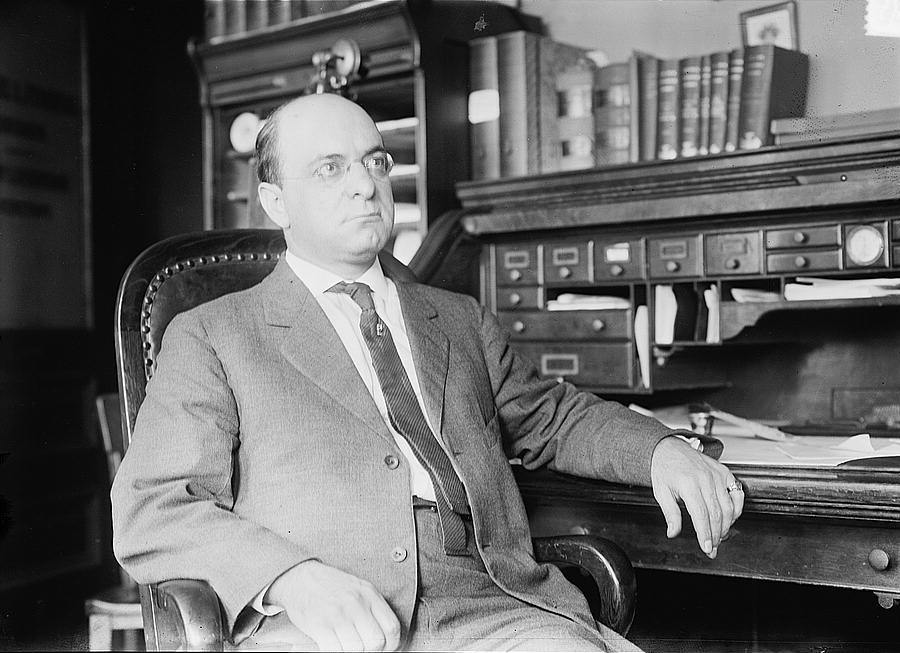
Feinberg in 1914

Israel Lewis Feinberg, M.D. (1872 – April 13, 1941) was a physician and the Coroner of New York County, New York, from 1910 to 1918, where he served as president of the board of coroners.

== Biography ==
He was born in 1872 to Minnie (1834–?) in New York City. He married Pauline Cohen on November 25, 1897, and they had two children: Harry Feinberg (1899–?) and Ernestine Feinberg (1908–?). In 1914 he lobbied for the abolishment of the office of Coroner of New York City. He died on April 13, 1941, in Manhattan.
