= Edmund Randolph Peaslee =

American physician

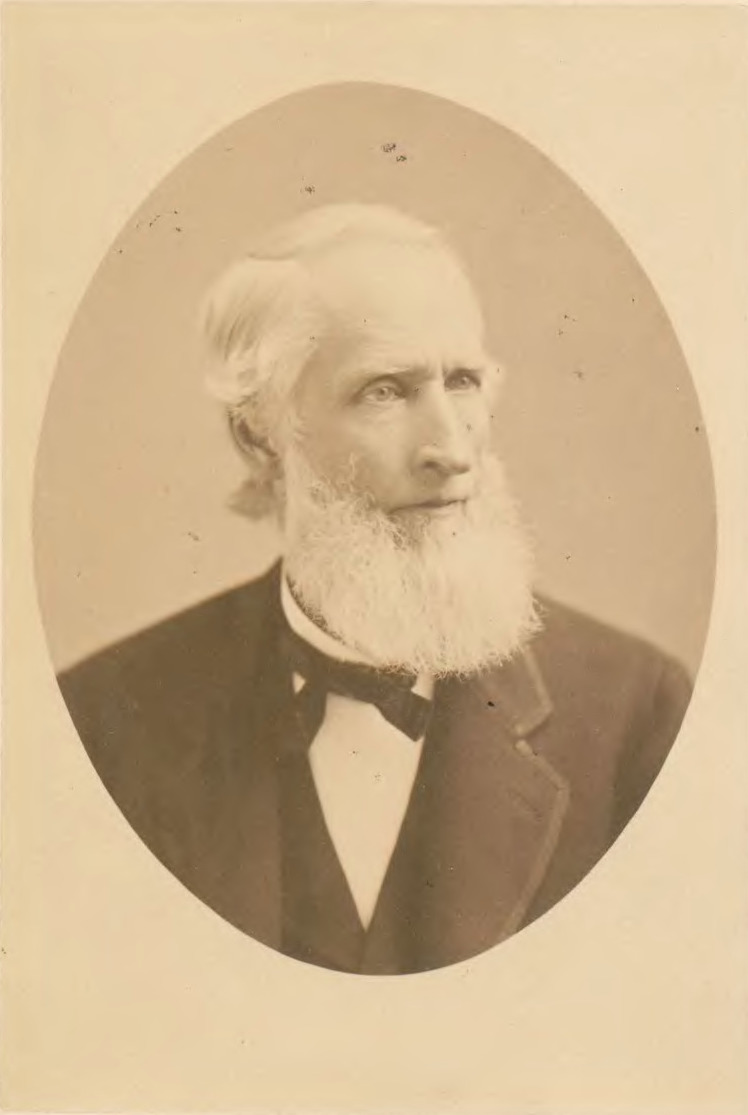
- Born: January 22, 1814
- Died: January 21, 1878 (aged 63)
- Education: Dartmouth College, Yale School of Medicine
- Occupation: Medical doctor
- Employer: Bowdoin College; New York University Grossman School of Medicine

Signature
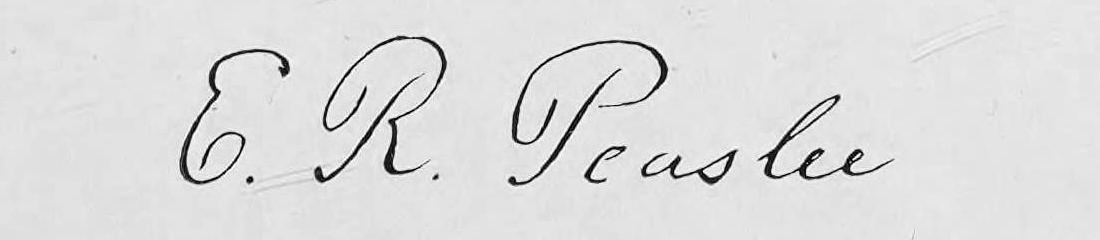

Edmund Randolph Peaslee (January 22, 1814 – January 21, 1878) was an American medical doctor.

Peaslee, son of James and Abigail (Chase) Peaslee, was born in Newton, New Hampshire, January 22, 1814.

He graduated at Dartmouth College in Hanover, New Hampshire, in 1836, and after a year spent in teaching in Lebanon, New Hampshire, returned to the college as a tutor. He retired from the tutorship in 1839, having in the meantime begun his professional studies in the Medical School connected with Dartmouth, and then continuing them at Yale Medical School, where he graduated in 1840. In 1841 he began practice as a medical doctor in Hanover, and a year later became Professor of Anatomy and Physiology at Dartmouth. This chair he continued to fill until 1870. He was also appointed lecturer on Anatomy and Surgery in Bowdoin College, Maine, in 1843, and was made professor of these branches in the same college in 1845, retaining the position until 1857, and also continuing to act as Professor of Surgery until 1860. In 1851 he was appointed Professor of Physiology and Pathology in the New York Medical College, of N. Y. City, and in 1858 (in which year he removed his residence from Hanover to New York) he accepted the Professorship of Obstetrics in the same institution, which he held until 1860.

From the date of his removal to New York he took a leading position in his profession, making a specialty of the diseases of women, and particularly of ovariotomy. His treatise on Ovarian Tumors, published in 1872, was the standard authority on that subject. He also published in 1854 a work on Human Histology, and was a frequent and valued contributor to the medical journals. In 1872 he was elected Professor of Gynaecology in Dartmouth College, and in 1814 Gynaecology was made a separate chair in Bellevne Hospital Medical College, N. Y., and he was elected the first Professor. He filled many positions of honor in various Medical Associations of New York. In 1859 the degree of Doctor of Laws was conferred on him by Dartmouth College.

== Legacy ==
After an unusually exhausting series of professional engagements, he was attacked with pneumonia, and died after a week's illness, January 21, 1878, aged 64 years. He was married, July 11, 1841, to Martha T., daughter of Hon. Stephen Kendrick, of Lebanon, N H., who survived him with one son and one daughter. The son was graduated from Yale in 1872.

After his death, Dartmouth President Samuel C. Bartlett gave a discourse on Peaslee's life and achievements, which was printed as a book.
