= Theodore Allen (saloon keeper) =

American gambler, political organizer, saloon keeper and head of a criminal family

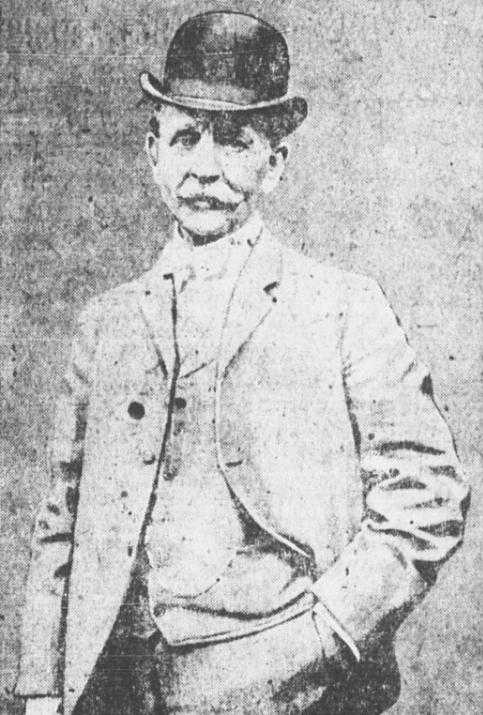
- Born: 1833
- Died: 1908
- Other name: The Allen
- Occupation: Saloon keeper
- Known for: Saloon keeper, political "fixer" and underworld figure in New York City during the mid-to late 19th century.

Theodore Allen, known simply as The. Allen, (c. 1833–1908) was an American gambler, political organizer, saloon keeper and head of a criminal family in New York City during the mid-to-late 19th century. Born to a devout and prominent Methodist family, he and four of his nine brothers were notorious underworld figures; Wesley, Martin and William Allen were professional burglars while the fourth brother, John Allen, ran an illegal gambling den.

Allen was a butcher's boy for the notorious Bill "the Butcher" Poole and a leader among the Bowery Boy subculture. Allen became a close friend of Poole's, having been present for most of the events leading up to Poole's death in 1855, as well as for the riots that flared up in the wake of Poole's funeral.

During the American Civil War, Allen volunteered for service and became a junior officer in the 25th New York Infantry Regiment, D Company, but he had resigned his commission as a Lieutenant by August 1861. In 1864 he was arrested for his participation in a "bounty swindling" fraud scheme, in which men accepted cash bounties for voluntarily enlisting in the Union Army under assumed names before absconding to repeat the process and collect more money. Allen drew a revolver and attempted to shoot the arresting officer, but the gun failed to fire Allen was later released and was never convicted for the alleged offences.

Allen ran for alderman of New York City's 5th district in 1866 with the support of several factions of the Democratic party, including Tammany Hall. He lost the general election by 85 votes.

He was the owner of The American Mabille, named after the Jardin de Mabille in Paris, originally located at a Bleecker Street home. The popular resort included a dance hall and concert saloon, in the basement and first floor respectively, which housed "all classes of the demi-monde from the sun-bleared Cyprian of the Bowery ... to the diamond-bedecked mistress of some sporting man" and where it was said "dissolute women in gaudy tights danced and sang ribald songs". It was also notorious for allowing women to visit the establishment in order to drink, dance and socialize with men, which was presumed to eventually lead them into prostitution, one journalist claiming that the concert saloon caused "the ruin of more young girls than all the dive keepers in New York". Allen owned half a dozen similar establishments, among them the St. Bernard Hotel at Prince and Mercer Streets, as well as financed gambling dens and other "places of ill-fame".

In 1873, Allen's sister-in-law, Sarah Allen, assisted the convicted murderer, William Sharkey, in his famous escape from The Tombs. Sarah Allen was married to Theodore Allen's brother Wesley Allen, who was also imprisoned in the Tombs at the time.

In September 1878 Allen was acquitted of the accidental shooting of Edward Malloy. For most of the remainder of his life, he was involved in Republican politics and ran illegal gambling establishments in Manhattan. He has arrested hundreds of times but charges were invariably either dropped or never seriously pursued by prosecutors.

Allen was a supporter of the candidacy of the Garfield/Arthur ticket in 1880, serving as Vice President of the 4th Ward Young Men's Garfield and Arthur Club. He was an active part of the New York City Republican political machine during most of his adult life.

Allen was divorced from his wife, Ida Elizabeth Allen, in November 1880. Soon after, he married Ella Abbie Glover, a 23-year-old heiress who had inherited $423,000 two years earlier.

In July 1891, Allen was playing poker when he became involved in a fight with John Carrero, an Italian immigrant. Carrero stabbed Allen with an ice pick five times and Allen was not expected to live, due to a wound below the ribs which doctors believed to have punctured the intestines. Despite this, Allen survived and continued to operate his saloons and underground gambling establishments.

In 1894, he was arrested again based on complaints by Pinkerton detectives for operating an illegal pool hall in New York City. No conviction resulted. In June 1895 he was charged again for keeping a pool room at 22 South Fifth Avenue. Again, the charges disappeared.

In an 1898 interview, Allen insisted that he had been the innocent victim of decades of police abuse. He claimed that there was an indictment against him which had been waiting for action for 22 years. As he told the New York Sun, "The newspapers, which have been abusing me for years, and have made me out a sort of interesting desperado, say that I've got a pull. Every time the police get a warrant for me, make a raid on it, and don't find any evidence of a poolroom, they say that I had a tip in advance. For years the papers talked about 'the' Allen's pull. I never had a pull of any kind in my life, though I've been credited with considerable push. I never had a tip that I was going to be raided in my life, and I never asked a favour from a politician... If the newspapers had let me alone I wouldn't be what you call a notorious character now. They started in on me in 1860, when I was quite prominent in Republican politics. I had two brothers who were worthless fellows, but I stuck to them for years and years and spent over a hundred thousand dollars keeping them out of trouble. Then the newspapers used to refer to the famous Allen brothers and to the notorious 'The' Allen, brother of Wes and Jess Allen. I never committed a crime in my life."

Allen said in a 1907 interview that he was introduced to gambling and to faro, then North America's most popular card game, by Larry Jerome, father of District Attorney William Travers Jerome.

Allen died suddenly in New York of unspecified causes in May 1908 at the home of his son-in-law, Clarence E. Owen He left an estate worth $300,000 to his granddaughter and adopted daughter, worth around $8,000,000 in 2021 dollars, adjusted for inflation.
