= James Rushmore Wood =

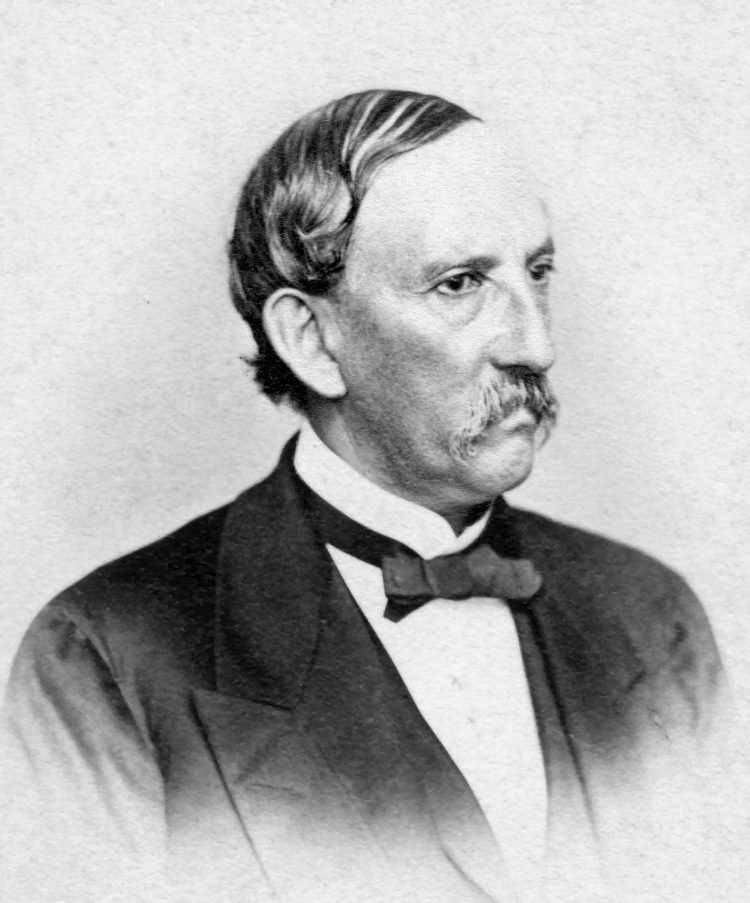
- Born: September 14, 1813 (Note: some sources give September 14, 1813); Mamaroneck, New York State
- Died: May 4, 1882
- Occupations: Professor, Doctor

James Rushmore Wood (September 14, 1813 – May 4, 1882), born in Mamaroneck, New York, was an American surgeon and one of the founders of Bellevue Hospital Medical College in New York City. He retired from his university duties in 1868.

== Descendants ==
- A grandson of the same name, wed to Katherine Lawrence Wickham, was a soldier during World War I.
