= Israel Joseph Zevin =

Jewish-American writer

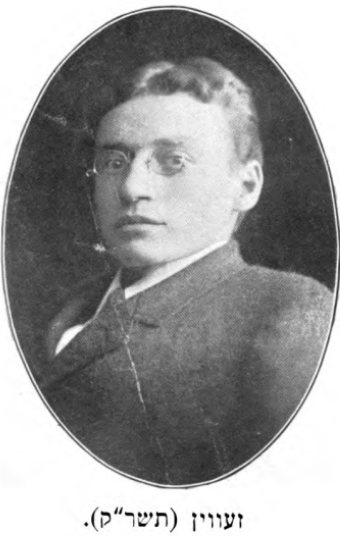
ישראל_יוסף_זוין

Israel Joseph Zevin (January 31, 1872 – October 6, 1926), better known by his pseudonym Tashrak, was a Belarusian-born Jewish-American Yiddish humorist.

== Life ==
Zevin was born on January 31, 1872, in Gorki, Mogilev Governorate, Russian Empire, the son of Judah Leib Zevin and Feige Muravin.

Zevin attended a Russian cheder and received a private education. He immigrated to America in 1889 and lived in New York City, where he worked as a newsboy on Park Row. He wrote his first literary productions in 1893, when he was selling candies from a stand on Bowery. He was first published in Yidishes Tageblat and remained connected with that paper for the rest of his life, becoming one of their main contributors and writing for them under different pseudonyms (mainly Yudkovitsh). In 1894, he briefly worked as editor of the Philadelphia weekly Di Yudishe Prese. He began regularly contributing to Der Morgen Zhurnal in 1924, mainly in the section "Far Hoyz un Familye” (For Home and Family). He also occasionally wrote for the Warsaw papers Dos Leben, Der Fraynd, and Der Shoyfer, the New York City papers Minikes Yontef Bleter, Minikes Yohr-Bukh, and Di Idishe Bihne, and other Yiddish publications. From 1907 to 1914, he was a standing contributor for the New York Herald and published eighty humorous stories about Jewish life in New York City for the paper. Two of his stories appeared in Helena Frank's 1912 Yiddish Tales.

In 1900, Zevin joined the editorial board of Yidishes Tageblat. He won recognition for his humorous tales about the typical Jewish immigrant's adventures in America. His stories were published in Y.Y. Zevins Geklibene Shriftn ("Selected Works of Y.Y. Zevin") in 1906, Geklibene Shriftn ("Selected Works") in 1909, and the four-volume Tashraks Beste Ertseylungen ("Tashrak's Best Stories") in 1910. Near the end of his life, he collected aggadot, midrashim, and proverbs, translated them into Yiddish, and published them in several volumes of anthropologies. In 1919, he published a book of children's stories called Mayselekh far Kinder ("Stories For Children"). He also wrote a number of stories in Hebrew, and a novel was published after his death. He began writing in English in 1905, mainly translations of his own work that he published in the English section of Yidishes Tageblat and in the weekly The American Hebrew.

In 1908, Zevin married Sophia Berman. They had two daughters.

Zevin died at his home in Brooklyn from influenza bronchopneumonia on October 6, 1926. His funeral was held at the Educational Alliance building on East Broadway. He was buried in Acadia Cemetery.
