= Murder of Elsie Sigel =

American murder victim (1889–1909)

Elsie Sigel
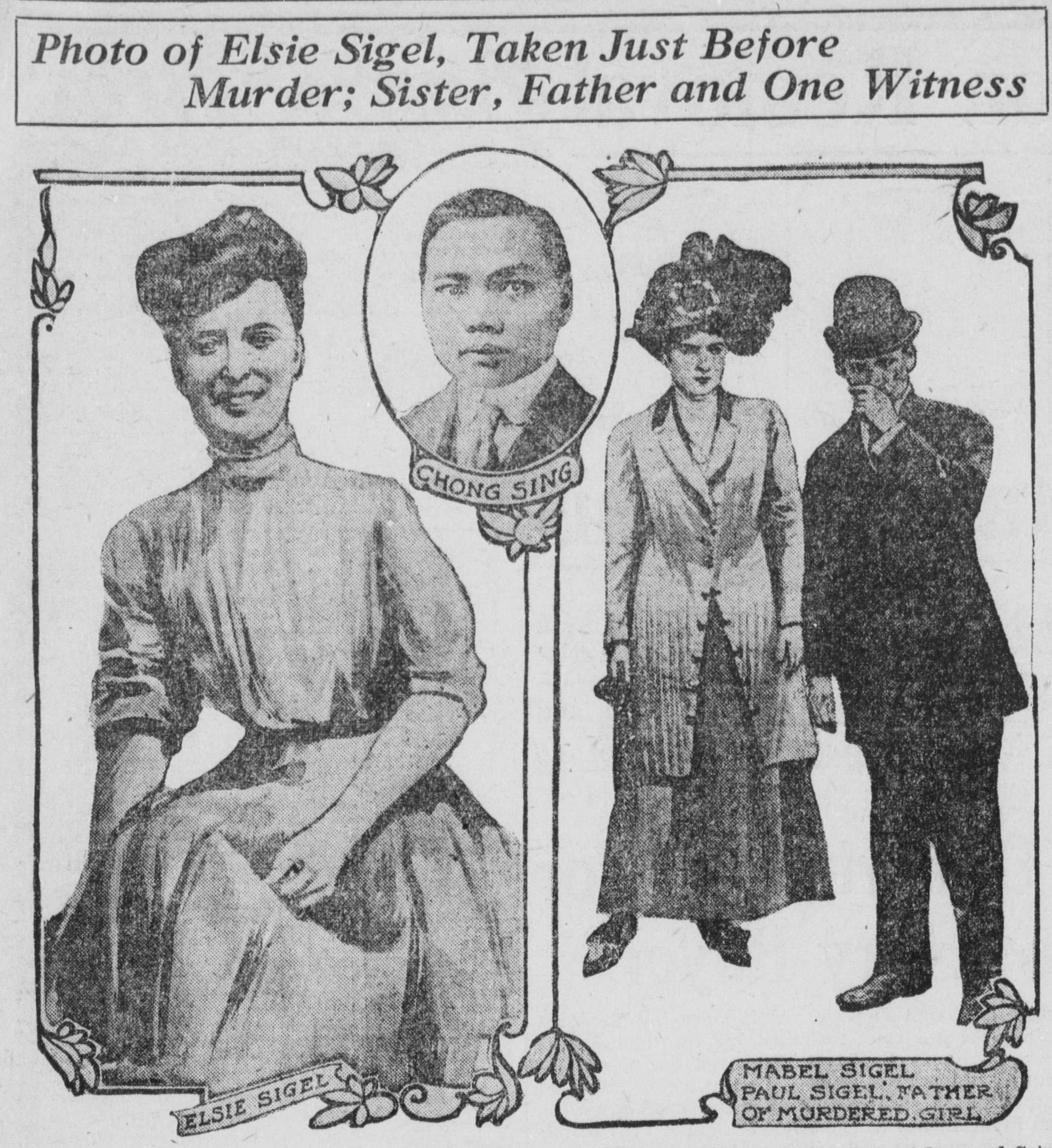
- L-R: Elsie Sigel; Chong Sing (witness); Mabel and Paul Sigel (sister and father). From the Los Angeles Herald, 27 June 1909.
- Born: 1888
- Died: June 9, 1909 (age 19); New York City, New York
- Body discovered: June 18, 1909
- Occupation: Missionary
- Known for: Being murdered

Elsie Sigel (1889 – June 1909) was a granddaughter of Union Army General Franz Sigel, and the victim of a notorious murder at the age of 19 in New York City in 1909.

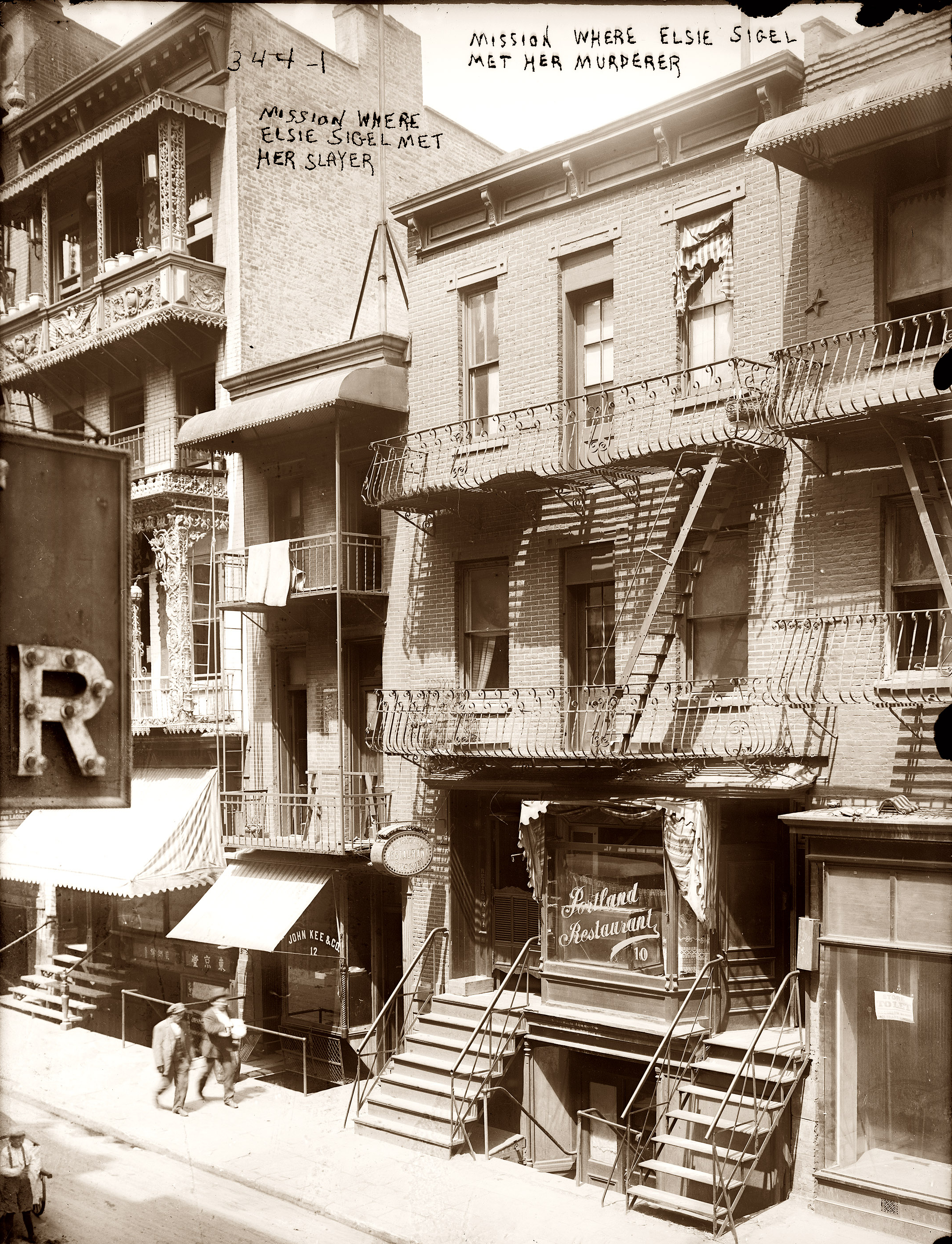
The Chinatown mission at 10 Mott Street where Sigel volunteered, viewed from the balcony of the Port Arthur Restaurant.

Sigel, who had been a missionary in Chinatown, was found strangled inside a trunk on June 18, 1909, in the apartment of the prime suspect, a Chinese man named "William" Leon Ling, a waiter in a Chinese restaurant. Sigel had been missing since June 9, when she was last seen leaving her parents' apartment to visit her grandmother.

== Background ==
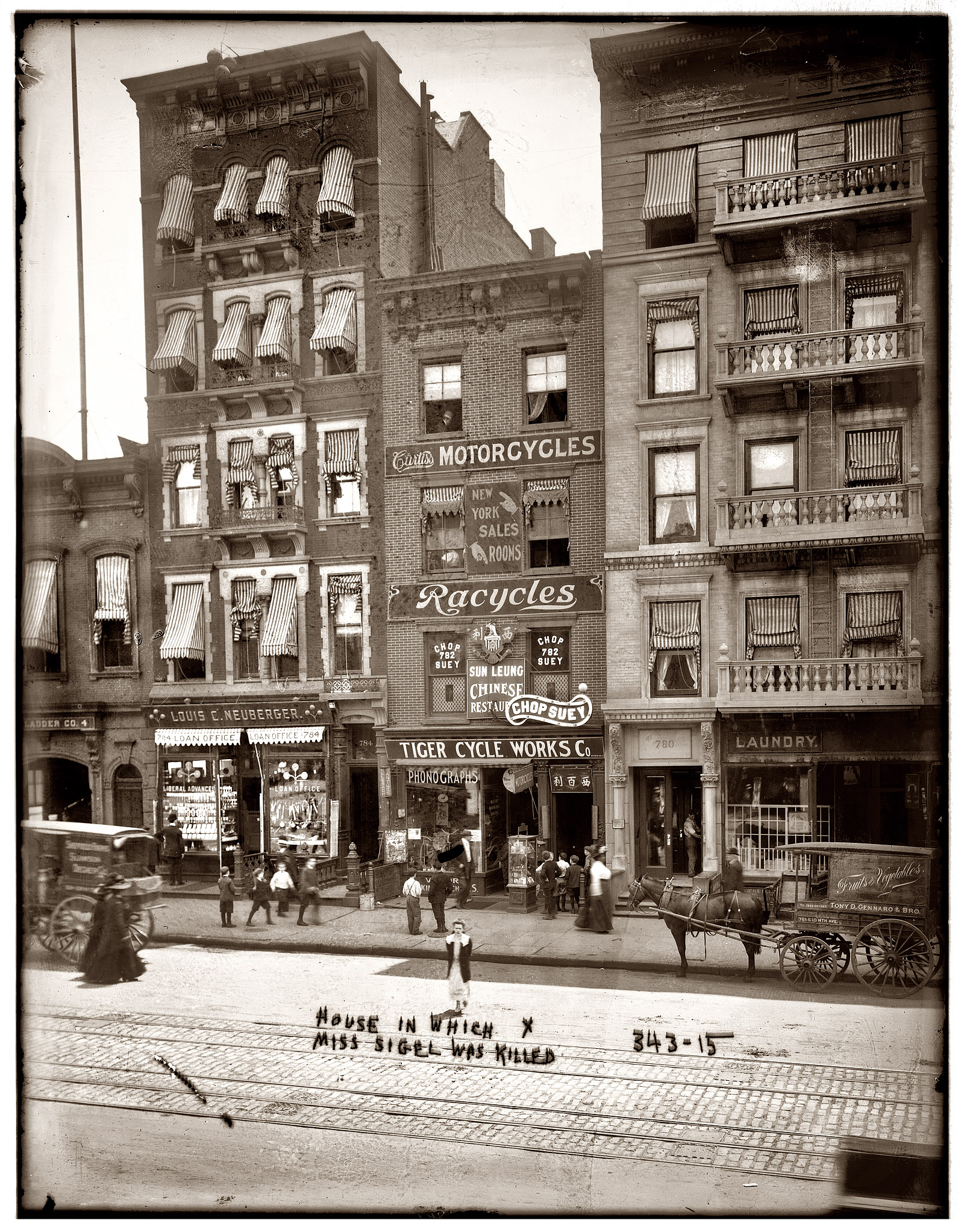
Sigel's body was found on the top floor of 782 8th Avenue.

Sigel's mother taught a Chinese Sunday school class in St. Andrew's Church at 127th Street and Fifth Avenue, while Sigel did missionary work at the Chinatown Rescue Settlement and Recreation Room, reaching out to "American, English, German, French, Hebrew, Italian, [and] Bohemian" girls who had gotten involved with drugs and prostitution. Four years prior to the murder, Leon had kept a chop suey restaurant on Amsterdam Avenue, close to the Sigel home, and Sigel and her mother had first met Leon there during missionary rounds of the local Chinese restaurants.

== Investigation ==
During the murder investigation, 35 love letters signed by Sigel were found in Leon's apartment, along with numerous letters from other women. It was speculated that the motive for murder might have been jealousy, as Chu Gain, manager of the Port Arthur Restaurant on Mott Street, was also found to be in possession of recent love letters from Sigel. Chu reported that he had recently received an anonymous letter threatening Sigel's life if they did not cut off their relationship. Leon was never apprehended, and the murder remains unsolved.

The manhunt for Leon Ling also led to widespread suspicion and targeting of Chinese communities across the country. The publication of suspects’ photographs and descriptions encouraged both police and ordinary citizens to participate in the search. As a result, many Chinese men, including laundry workers, restaurant staff, students, and even diplomats, were detained regardless of evidence. This response reflected broader implications of racial injustice and assumptions that Chinese individuals were all indistinguishable and therefore all suspects of a crime that one man committed.

== Aftermath ==
Sigel's murder gained widespread notoriety due to the interracial aspects of the relationship as well as the fame of her grandfather, Franz Sigel, who was a U.S. Civil War general. The murder set off a wave of anti-Chinese hysteria, as well as suggestions that the murder was Sigel's own fault. The murder became the subject of a play, The Chinatown Trunk Mystery, which was performed around the country. Bayonne, New Jersey banned screening films about her murder, several of which, probably newsreels, existed.

Popular culture references

This subject of her murder along with the names were also used as a leitmotif Jed Rubenfeld's blok "The Interpretation of Murder" which had been published on 2006.

== See also ==
- List of solved missing person cases: pre–1950
- List of unsolved murders (1900–1979)
