= Israel Jacob =

Kingdom of Prussia philanthropist (1729–1803)

Israel Jacob (1729–1803) was a philanthropist in the Kingdom of Prussia.

Jacob was born on 14 April 1729 in Halberstadt.

Jacob, a banker, a philanthropist to people of all backgrounds, was widely respected for his philanthropy.

Jacob was court agent to the Duke of Brunswick and the Margrave of Baden.

Due to Jacob's efforts, the Jews' body-tax (Leibzoll) was repealed in the state of Baden.

In addition, Jacob took a prominent part in the conferences which were held in Berlin and Spandau duscussing apportioning of the Jews' tax among the Prussian communities.

Jacob died on 25 November 1803.
