= George Frederick Shrady Jr. =

Coroner of New York City (1861–1933)

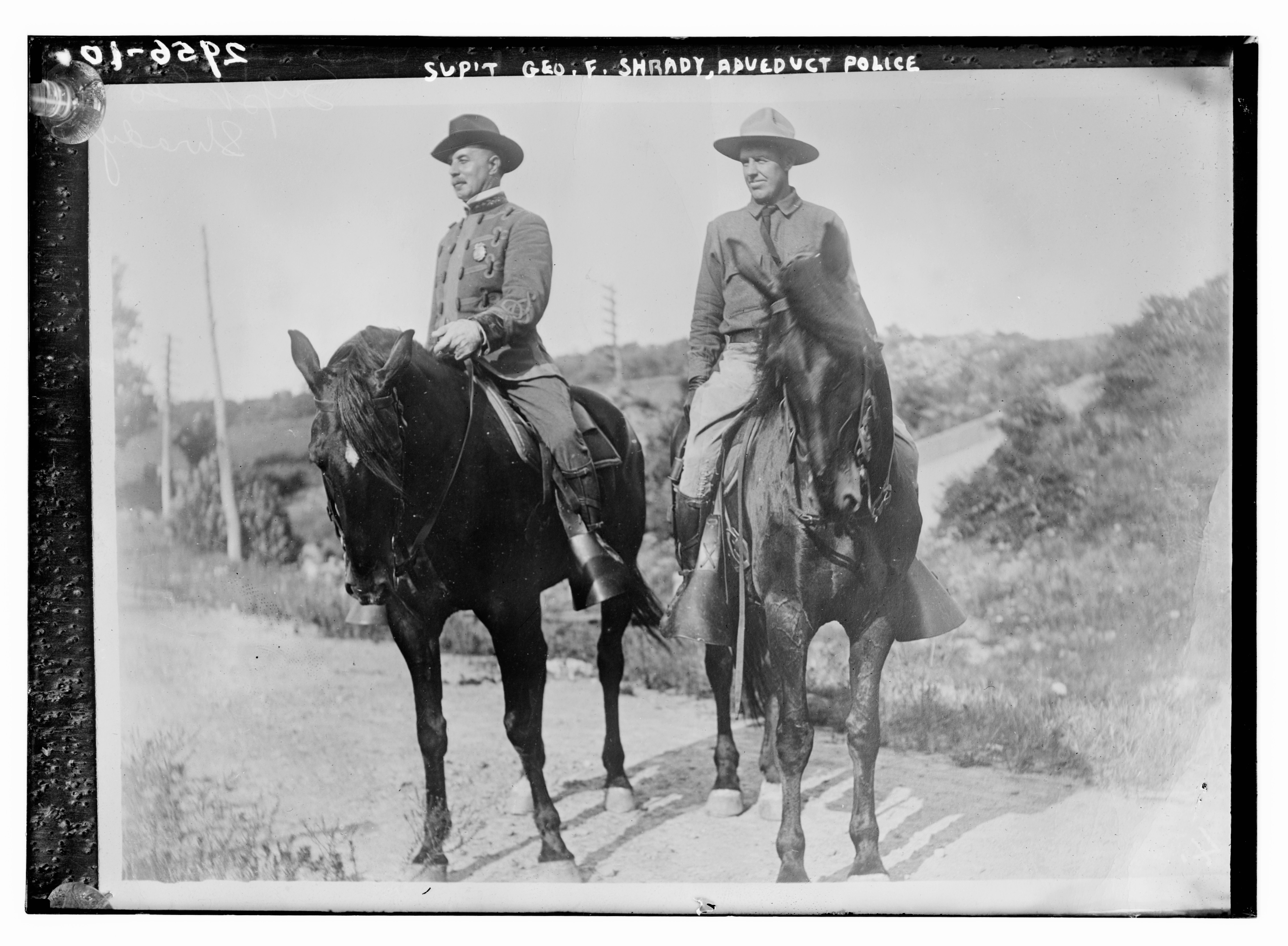
Supt. George Frederick Shrady, Aqueduct Police, between 1910 and 1915

George Frederick Shrady Jr. M.D. (October 11, 1861 – April 5, 1933) was the Coroner of New York County, New York, in 1906, and head of the Aqueduct Police.

== Biography ==
He was born on October 11, 1861, to Dr. George Frederick Shrady Sr. (1830–1907) and Mary Lewis (1843–1883) of New York City. His siblings were Henry Merwyn Shrady, Charles Douglas Shrady, and Minnie E. Shrady (1864–1933). George Jr. married Katharine Wolfe Ambrose (1862–1945), daughter of the brilliant civil engineer, John Wolfe Ambrose, on Oct. 10, 1887, in Manhattan. Meanwhile, his sister, Minnie, married Katharine Wolfe Ambrose's brother, John Fremont Ambrose, who became the City's Department of Docks and Ferries Superintendent. George Jr. served as the Coroner of New York County, New York in 1906. He was head of the Aqueduct Police around 1910. He died on April 5, 1933, in Manhattan, New York City. He is buried at Green-Wood Cemetery, in Brooklyn, New York, alongside his wife, Katharine, in the Ambrose Family Plot.
