= Killing of Michael Brown =

2014 police shooting in Ferguson, Missouri, US

- Brown in an undated photo
- Date: August 9, 2014; 12 years ago
- Time: 12:01–12:03 p.m. (CDT)
- Location: Ferguson, Missouri, U.S.; 38°44′18″N 90°16′25″W
- Type: Homicide, police shooting
- Participants: Darren Wilson (shooter); Michael Brown (deceased); Dorian Johnson (accompanied Brown)
- Deaths: Michael Brown
- Injuries: Darren Wilson
- Charges: None
- Litigation: Wrongful death lawsuit settled for undisclosed amount

On August 9, 2014, 18-year-old Michael Brown was shot and killed by police officer Darren Wilson in Ferguson, Missouri, a suburb of St. Louis.

Brown was accompanied by his 22-year-old male friend Dorian Johnson. Wilson, a white male Ferguson police officer, said that an altercation ensued when Brown attacked him in his police vehicle for control of his service pistol. Johnson claimed that Wilson initiated the confrontation by grabbing Brown by the neck through Wilson's patrol car window, threatening him and then shooting at Brown. At this point, both Wilson and Johnson state that Brown and Johnson fled, with Wilson pursuing Brown shortly thereafter. Wilson stated that Brown then stopped, turned around and charged at him after the short pursuit. Johnson contradicted this account, stating that Brown turned around with his hands raised up after Wilson shot him in the back. According to Johnson, Wilson shot Brown multiple times until Brown fell to the ground. In the entire altercation, Wilson fired a total of twelve bullets, including twice during the struggle in the car. Brown was struck a total of six times, all in the front of his body. A DOJ investigation would go on to largely corroborate the claims made by officer Wilson.

This event ignited unrest in Ferguson. Johnson, and later some other witnesses, claimed Brown had his hands up in surrender or said "don't shoot", which led to protestors using the slogan "Hands up, don't shoot". A subsequent FBI investigation said that there was no evidence that Brown had done so, with the U.S. Department of Justice also acknowledging an official report that no other witnesses credibly backed this claim, with some who contradicted Wilson's story even retracting their initial accounts of what they said they witnessed during the shooting. Peaceful protests and violent riots continued for more than a week in Ferguson; police later established a nightly curfew. The response of area police agencies in dealing with the protests was strongly criticized by both the media and politicians. Concerns were raised over insensitivity, tactics, and a militarized response.

A grand jury was called and given evidence from Robert McCulloch, the St. Louis County Prosecutor. On November 24, 2014, McCulloch announced the St. Louis County grand jury had decided not to indict Wilson. In March 2015, the U.S. Department of Justice reported the conclusion of its own investigation and cleared Wilson of civil rights violations in the shooting. They concluded that witnesses and forensic evidence supported Wilson's account. The report stated that "multiple credible witnesses corroborate virtually every material aspect of Wilson's account and are consistent with the physical evidence". The U.S. Department of Justice concluded that Wilson shot Brown in self-defense.

In 2020, St. Louis County prosecutor Wesley Bell spent five months reviewing the case with an eye to charge Wilson with either manslaughter or murder. In July, Bell announced Wilson would not be charged.

== Background ==
Michael Orlandus Darrion Brown (May 20, 1996 – August 9, 2014) graduated from Normandy High School in St. Louis County eight days before his death, completing an alternative education program. At the time of his death, he was 18 years old, 6 feet 4 inches (1.93 meters) tall, and weighed 292 pounds (132 kilograms). He was an amateur rap musician who posted his songs on the popular music-sharing site SoundCloud under the handle "Big'Mike." He was two days from starting a training program for heating and air conditioning repair at Vatterott College technical school.

Darren Dean Wilson (born May 14, 1986, in Fort Worth, Texas) is 6 ft 4 in (1.93 m) tall and at the time weighed about 210 lb (95 kg). Wilson's first police job was in the town of Jennings, Missouri, where he began working in 2009. With respect to this job, Wilson said to The New Yorker in 2015, "I'd never been in an area where there was that much poverty."

The police force in Jennings was shut down by the town's city council in March 2011. In October 2011, Wilson began working for the Ferguson Police Department. In February 2013, Wilson won a commendation from the Ferguson Police Department after he apprehended a suspect who was later charged with possession of marijuana with intent to distribute and resisting arrest.

=== Brown's activities prior to the incident ===
Surveillance video which was publicly released in the 2017 documentary film Stranger Fruit shows Michael Brown walking into Ferguson Market and Liquor at 1:13 a.m., ten-and-a-half hours before he entered the store for the final time. The footage shows Brown handing a young clerk a brown package, believed by the filmmaker to be marijuana, and then receiving an unpurchased package of cigarillos from the store. After the video was rediscovered and made public in 2017, some, including Brown's family, said they believed Brown had left the package there for safekeeping and later returned to retrieve it. The store owner disputed this through an attorney who dismissed claims that the store traded him "cigarillos for pot." The lawyer claimed "[t]he reason he [Brown] gave it back is he was walking out the door with unpaid merchandise and they [the staff] wanted it back." The store's attorney said the video had been in the hands of Brown's family and law enforcement since the initial investigation, and said the video had been edited to remove the portion where the store clerk returned Brown's package to him. Following this, on March 13, 2017, unedited footage from the store was released by the St. Louis County prosecutor to try to settle questions.

== Incident ==
At 11:47 a.m., Officer Wilson responded to a call about a baby with breathing problems and drove to Glenark Drive in Ferguson, east of Canfield Drive. About three minutes later and several blocks away, Brown was recorded on camera stealing a box of Swisher Sweets cigars and forcefully shoving a Ferguson Market clerk. At 11:53, a police dispatcher reported "stealing in progress" at the Ferguson Market and described the suspect as a black male wearing a white T-shirt running toward QuikTrip. The suspect was reported as having stolen a box of Swisher cigars. Brown and his friend, Dorian Johnson, left the market at about 11:54 a.m. At 11:57, the dispatch described the suspect as wearing a red St. Louis Cardinals hat, a white T-shirt, yellow socks, and khaki shorts, and that he was accompanied by another male. Ferguson Police Chief Thomas Jackson said that the incident with Brown stealing cigars had "nothing to do" with why Brown was stopped by Wilson prior to the shooting, and that the reason Brown and Johnson were stopped was because "they were walking down the middle of the street, blocking traffic."

At 12:00 p.m., Wilson reported he was back in service and radioed units 25 and 22 to ask if they needed his assistance in searching for the suspects. Seven seconds later, an unidentified officer said the suspects had disappeared. Wilson called for backup at 12:02, saying "[Unit] 21. Put me on Canfield with two. And send me another car."

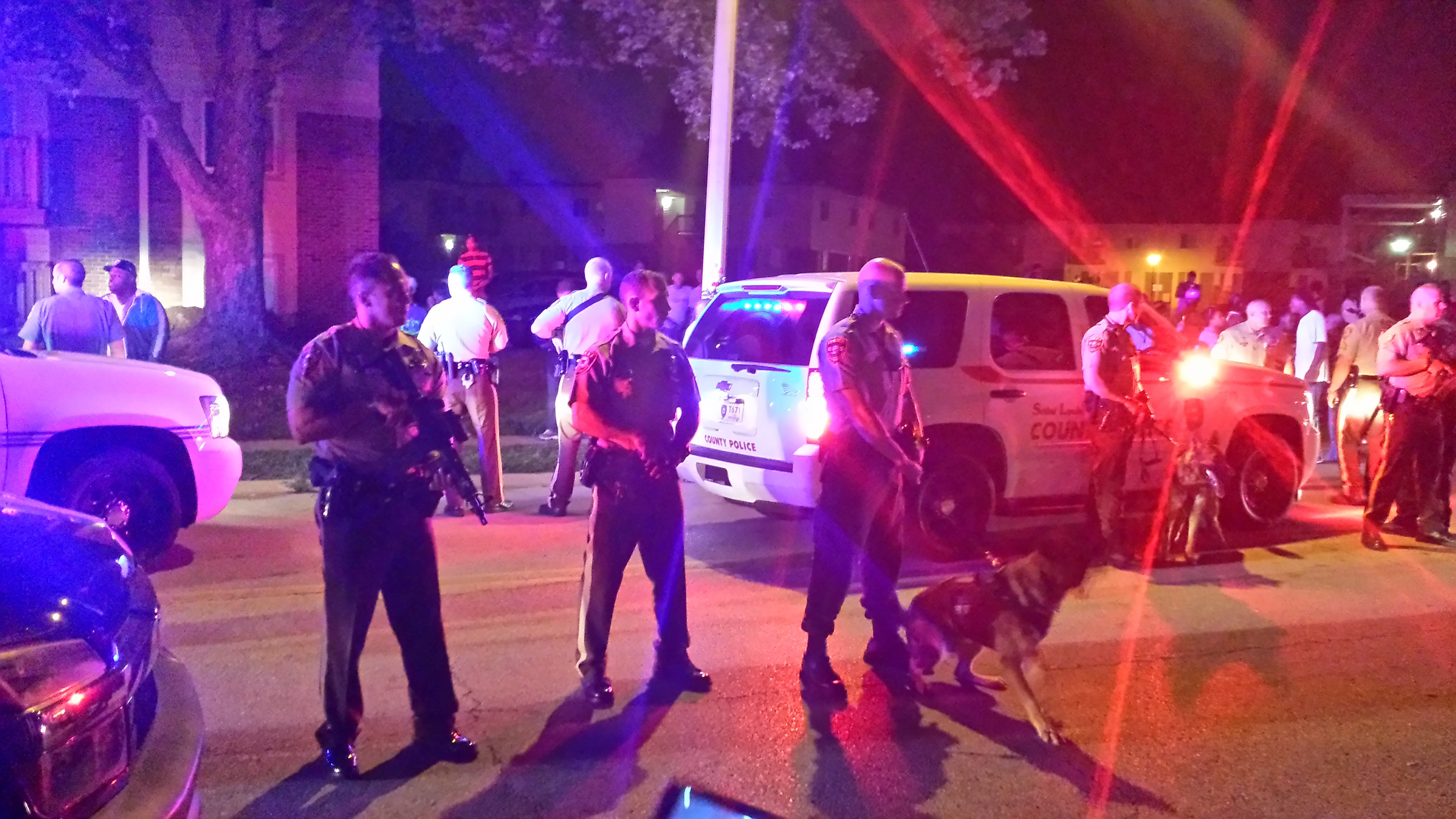
St. Louis County police protect the scene eight hours after the shooting

Initial reports of what happened next differed widely among sources and witnesses, particularly with regard to whether Brown was moving towards Wilson when the shots were fired. At noon on August 9, Wilson drove up to Brown and Johnson as they were walking in the middle of Canfield Drive and ordered them to move off the street. Wilson continued driving past the two men, but then backed up and stopped close to them. A struggle took place between Brown and Wilson after Brown reached through the window of Wilson's police SUV, a Chevrolet Tahoe. Wilson was armed with a SIG Sauer P229 pistol, which was fired twice during the struggle from inside the vehicle, with one bullet hitting Brown's right hand. Brown and Johnson fled and Johnson hid behind a car. Wilson got out of the vehicle and pursued Brown. At some point, Wilson fired his pistol again, while facing Brown, and hit him with at least six shots, all in the front of his body. Brown was unarmed and died on the street. Less than 90 seconds passed from the time Wilson encountered Brown to the time of Brown's death.

An unidentified officer arrived on the scene and, 73 seconds after Wilson's call, asked where the second suspect was. Thirty-one seconds later, a supervisor was requested by Unit 25. At 12:07 p.m., an officer on scene radioed to dispatch for more units. Also at 12:07, the St. Louis County police were notified and county officers began arriving on scene at around 12:15 p.m. The St. Louis County detectives were notified at 12:43 p.m. and arrived about 1:30 p.m., with the forensic investigator arriving at about 2:30 p.m.

Police dispatched 12 units to the scene by 1:00 p.m. with another 12, including two canine units, by 2:00 p.m. Gunshots were recorded in Ferguson police logs at 2:11 p.m., and by the ambulance dispatch again at 2:14 p.m., which led to the response of 20 more units from eight different municipal forces in the next 20 minutes. As the situation deteriorated, the police commanders had investigators seek cover and detectives assisted in crowd control. At 2:45, four canine units arrived on scene, and the SWAT team arrived at 3:20 p.m. The medical examiner began his examination of Brown at approximately 3:30 p.m. and concluded about half an hour later, with Brown's body being cleared to be taken to the morgue. At 4:37 p.m., Brown's body was signed in at the morgue by workers.

== Investigations ==
=== Police ===
Michael Brown was fatally shot by Officer Wilson at about 12:02 p.m. The Ferguson Police Department was on the scene within minutes, as were crowds of residents, some expressing hostility toward the police. Paramedics covered the body with sheets. About 20 minutes after the shooting, the Ferguson police chief turned over the homicide investigation to the St. Louis County Police Department (SLCPD). The arrival of SLCPD detectives took about 70 minutes, as they were occupied with another crime scene 37 minutes away. On arrival at 1:30 p.m., they put up privacy screens around the body. Their investigation was slowed due to safety concerns regarding the sound of gunfire in the area and some hostile members of the crowd encroaching on the crime scene. An investigator from the St. Louis County Medical Examiner's office arrived at 2:30 p.m. Brown's body was removed at 4:00 p.m. Local residents criticized authorities for leaving Brown's body in the street for four hours in an action seen as demeaning and disrespectful.

=== Department of Justice ===
On August 11, 2014, the Federal Bureau of Investigation (FBI) opened a civil rights investigation into the incident. A spokeswoman for the FBI's St. Louis field office said the decision to open an investigation was not motivated by the protests and riots which had ensued. Forty FBI agents went door-to-door looking for potential witnesses who may have had information about the shooting. Additionally, attorneys from the Civil Rights Division and from the United States Attorney's Office were participating in the investigation.

On March 4, 2015, the federal investigation cleared Wilson of civil rights violations in the shooting. The investigation concluded there was no evidence upon which prosecutors could rely to disprove Wilson's asserted belief that he feared for his safety, that witnesses who contradicted Wilson were not credible, that forensic evidence and credible witnesses corroborated Wilson's account, and that the facts did not support the filing of criminal charges against Wilson. Credible witnesses did not support accounts that Brown had his hands up in surrender. He was not shot in the back. Forensic evidence showed he was moving toward Wilson. Numerous witnesses were found to have given accounts of actions they were unable to see from their vantage points, or to be recounting others' accounts.

=== 2020 prosecutor review ===
A new St. Louis County prosecutor, Wesley Bell, spent five months in 2020 reviewing the case with an eye to charging Wilson with either manslaughter or murder. In July, Bell announced he would not charge Wilson with any crime; Bell said he didn't "have the evidence to ethically bring a charge against Darren Wilson."

== Grand jury hearing ==
The grand jury was made up of members who had been impaneled in May 2014 for a regularly scheduled term, to hear all cases put forward by the prosecuting attorney's office. There were three black jury members (one man and two women) and nine white jury members (six men and three women), an ethnic breakdown that roughly reflects the racial makeup of St. Louis County, which is about 30% black, and 70% white. On August 20, 2014, the grand jury started hearing evidence in the case State of Missouri v. Darren Wilson, in order to decide whether a crime was committed and if there was probable cause to believe Wilson committed it.

There was intense interest focused on the grand jury. Robert P. McCulloch, the elected prosecuting attorney for St. Louis County, was in charge of the prosecution but did not participate in the direct handling of the grand jury hearing. It was handled by two Assistant Prosecuting Attorneys of McCulloch's office: Kathi Alizadeh and Sheila Whirley. McCulloch announced an unusual process: the grand jury would hear all the evidence, the proceedings would be transcribed, and the materials would be made public if the grand jury did not indict.

The grand jury took 25 days, over the span of three months, to hear more than 5,000 pages of testimony from 60 witnesses and then deliberate on whether or not to indict Wilson. Most grand juries complete their work in a matter of days. The grand jury was not sequestered during the process.

On the night of November 24, Prosecutor McCulloch reported in a 20-minute press conference that the grand jury had reached a decision in the case and would not indict Wilson.

Following his announcement, McCulloch released thousands of pages of grand jury documents, with materials published on the internet for public perusal. The documents include transcripts of the proceedings, expert statements, and the testimony of some witnesses. On December 8, more witness interviews and more than 50 brief audio recordings between the police dispatchers and responding police officers were released. On December 13, a third release included the transcripts of witness interviews, including one with Dorian Johnson. A video of the two-hour interview of Johnson by FBI and county police was withheld.

Robert P. McCulloch was the main focus of much of the criticism throughout the process and well into its aftermath. An attorney named Raul Reyes writing an article for CNN characterized McCulloch as not being impartial, as his father was a police officer killed in an incident with a black suspect and other members of his family served with the St. Louis Police Department. A petition calling for McCulloch to recuse himself gained 70,000 signatures. Governor Jay Nixon declined to remove McCulloch and said doing so would potentially jeopardize the prosecution. McCulloch dismissed the claims of bias, and later said he regretted not speaking publicly about his background at the time.

Legal analysts raised concerns over McCulloch's unorthodox approach, saying this process could have influenced the grand jury to decide against indictment and that they were given too much material to assess. The analysts highlighted the significant differences between a typical grand jury proceeding in Missouri and how Wilson's case was handled.

== Evidence ==
=== Shooting scene ===
Evidence presented to the grand jury showed that the shooting scene extended approximately 184 feet (56 m) along Canfield Drive, near where it intersects Copper Creek Court. The two-lane street runs east to west, and has sidewalks and curbs on both sides. Immediately prior to the incident, Brown was walking eastbound on Canfield and Officer Wilson was driving westbound. Evidence at the scene was generally clustered around Wilson's patrol SUV on the western side of the scene and near Brown's body, which was in the eastern part of the area.

Diagram of the shooting scene

The 30-foot (9.1 m) western area included Wilson's SUV, which was angled slightly toward the right curb with its left-rear corner on the center line. Evidence included two bracelets, (Note: Although bracelets were found on the passenger and driver sides of Wilson's vehicle, the DOJ report noted that neither of the two bracelets found on the scene had its owner identified, and when they appeared on the road was never determined.) a baseball cap, and two .40 caliber spent casings. One of these casings was found at the western edge of the scene and the other was located near the rear driver's side of the police vehicle. There were two groups of red stains near the driver's side of the vehicle and a left sandal was also located in the vicinity. The right sandal was approximately 44 feet (13 m) east of the western area.

The eastern area, which was approximately 124 feet (38 m) east of the western area, was about 29 feet (8.8 m) wide. Brown's body was situated along the center-line of the road with his head oriented in a westerly direction. The distance from the driver's door of Wilson's SUV to Brown's head was about 153 feet (47 m). Two groups of red stains were located at the extreme eastern edge of the scene, with the furthest under 22 feet (6.7 m) from Brown's feet.

One apparent projectile was found near the body. There were ten spent .40-caliber casings scattered on the south side of the road near Brown's body. The distribution of the casings, combined with most of the casings being east of the body, was consistent with Officer Wilson moving backward while firing. Blood spatter approximately 25 feet (7.6 m) behind Brown's body suggested Brown was moving toward Wilson when Brown was killed.

=== DNA ===
Brown's DNA was found on Wilson's gun. His DNA was also found on the left thigh of Officer Wilson's pants and on the inside driver's door handle of Wilson's police SUV, the result of Brown's spilled blood staining Wilson's pants and the door handle. Wilson's DNA was found on Brown's left palm but was not found under Brown's fingernails or on his right hand.

Michael Graham, the St. Louis medical examiner, said blood was found on Wilson's gun and inside the car, and tissue from Brown was found on the exterior of the driver's side of Wilson's vehicle; this evidence was consistent with a struggle at that location. According to Judy Melinek, a San Francisco pathologist who commented on the case as an expert, the official autopsy, which said Brown's hand had foreign matter consistent with a gun discharge on it, supported Wilson's testimony that Brown was reaching for the weapon, or indicated the gun was inches away from Brown's hand when it went off.

According to the detective who performed tests on the gun, he had to decide whether to perform a DNA test or dust for fingerprints, because only one test can be performed without affecting the other. He found the gun stored in an unsealed envelope, contrary to the customary evidence-handling protocol. Documents released after the grand jury proceedings show Wilson washed blood from his hands and checked his own gun into an evidence bag, both actions described by media outlets as unorthodox procedures for such a case.

=== Autopsies ===
Three autopsies (Note: County autopsy report: "Post-Mortem Examination – Exam Case 2104–5143 – Brown, Michael". St. Louis County Health, Office of the Medical Examiner. Independent autopsy report: "Autopsy Report – Michael Brown". Federal autopsy report: "Autopsy Report – Autopsy Number ME14-0240 – Brown, Michael". Department of Defense, Armed Forces Medical Examiner System, Office of the Armed Forces Medical Examiner.) were performed on Brown's body, with all three noting Brown had been shot at least six times, including twice in the head. He received no shots in his back.

The county autopsy report described gunshot entry and exit wounds to Brown's right arm coming from both the front (ventral, palms facing forward) and the back (dorsal, palms facing backward).

==== County ====
The local medical examiner autopsy report released to state prosecutors said Brown was shot in the front part of his body. When Mary Case, the St. Louis County medical examiner, was asked to provide details, she declined to comment further, citing the ongoing investigation into Brown's death. The official county autopsy was later leaked to the St. Louis Post-Dispatch.

The narrative report of investigation from the office of the medical examiner of St. Louis agreed with Wilson's testimony. It noted Brown had sustained multiple gunshot wounds to the head, torso, and right arm, as well as a single gunshot wound to the inside of his right hand near his thumb and palm; it also noted Brown's body had abrasions to the right side of his face and on the back of his left hand.

The autopsy noted the absence of stippling, powder burns around a wound that indicate a shot was fired at a relatively short range. Michael Graham notes gunshot wounds within an inch of the body do not always cause stippling. Microscopic examination of tissue taken from Brown's thumb wound detected the presence of a foreign material consistent with the material which is ejected from a gun while firing. The gunshot wound to the top of Brown's head was consistent with Brown either falling forward or being in a lunging position; the shot was instantly fatal.

A toxicology test performed by a St. Louis University laboratory revealed the presence of THC, the active ingredient in marijuana, in Brown's blood and urine. This indicated he used marijuana within a few hours of his death, but not whether he was impaired when he died.

==== Independent ====
At the request of Brown's family, on August 17 a preliminary autopsy was conducted by Michael Baden, a former chief medical examiner for the City of New York (1978–1979). This autopsy was limited because the previous county autopsy had washed, embalmed, and taken evidence off the body.

According to Baden's report, Brown was shot six times into his front: four of the bullets entered his right arm, one entered his right eye on a downward trajectory, and one entered the top of his skull. All of the rounds were fired from a distance of at least one foot. One of the shots shattered Brown's right eye, traveled through his face, then exited his jaw and reentered his collarbone. Brown could have survived the first bullet wounds, but the bullet that entered the top of his head resulted in a fatal injury.

Baden had no access to the clothing of the victim, and had not yet seen the x-rays showing where bullets were in the body. He could not determine if any gunpowder residue was on that clothing. Baden concluded there was too little information to forensically reconstruct the shooting. At least two commentators noted the results of both autopsies contradicted some aspects of some eyewitness accounts, which had reported Wilson shot Brown in the back and that Wilson shot Brown while holding Brown's neck. In later analysis, Baden reclassified one of Brown's chest wounds as an entry wound.

Baden was assisted by Shawn Parcells, who did not have a degree or credentials in medicine or pathology. Thomas Young, former Jackson County Medical Examiner, said Parcells gave out forensic pathology opinions despite not being qualified to do so. Mary Case, who performed the initial autopsy, said Parcells' involvement could cause issues with the second autopsy. Parcells said all he did was assist Baden. In 2021, Parcells was convicted in state court in Kansas of six criminal charges relating to autopsies he illegally performed in that state. In 2022, Parcells was convicted in federal court, also in Kansas, of wire fraud related to performing an autopsy in 2016 based on false credentials.

==== Federal ====
Attorney General Eric Holder ordered a third autopsy of Brown's body. Its findings matched the other two autopsies, but its detailed findings were initially withheld from the public due to the ongoing investigation. The federal autopsy report was among a group of documents released by the St. Louis County Prosecutor's Office on December 8, two weeks after the grand jury chose not to indict Wilson.

=== Audio recording of gunshots ===
On August 27, CNN released an audio recording purported to contain the sounds of the shooting. The recording was made by an anonymous third-party who happened to be recording a video-text message at the time of the incident. Glide, a video messaging service, confirmed the audio had been recorded on their site at 12:02 p.m. on the day of the shooting. The twelve-second recording contains a series of shots, a short pause, and then a second series of shots.

Forensic audio expert Paul Ginsberg says he heard six shots, a pause, and then four additional shots. Ginsberg said, "I was very concerned about that pause ... because it's not just the number of gunshots, it's how they're fired. And that has a huge relevance on how this case might finally end up." CNN's law enforcement analyst Tom Fuentes noted most accounts of the shooting say there was a single shot earlier in the incident near the vehicle that is not audible in the recording. The recording was also analyzed by SST, Inc., a company specializing in gunfire locator technology. That analysis found the sound of ten gunshots and seven gunshot echoes within seven seconds, with a three-second pause after the sixth shot. The company's analysis also said all ten rounds were fired from within a radius of 3 feet (0.91 m), indicating the shooter was not moving.

=== Handling ===
The Washington Post said there were unorthodox forensic practices shown in the published testimony of Officer Wilson and other law enforcement officials. The article said Wilson washed blood off of his hands without photographing them first. It also said Wilson submitted his gun to evidence by himself, and that initial interviews of Wilson were conducted with other personnel present and were not taped. It described Wilson's face injuries after the shooting as photographed by a local detective at the Fraternal Order of Police building, instead of at Ferguson Police headquarters. An investigator with the St. Louis County Medical Examiner's office testified he decided not to take measurements at the crime scene nor did he photograph the scene, instead relying on photographs taken by the St. Louis County Police Department.

== Witness accounts ==
Multiple witnesses saw part or all of the event and have given interviews to the media, testified to the grand jury, and were interviewed by the U.S. Department of Justice. The witness accounts were conflicting on various points. David A. Klinger, a criminologist at the University of Missouri–St. Louis, said eyewitness testimony often differs from witness to witness, a phenomenon commonly known as the Rashomon effect.

An Associated Press review of the grand jury found numerous problems in the witness testimony, including statements that were "inconsistent, fabricated, or provably wrong". Several of the witnesses admitted changing their testimony to fit released evidence, or other witness statements. Prosecuting attorney Robert McCulloch said, "I thought it was important to present anybody and everybody, and some that were, yes, clearly not telling the truth, no question about it."

The Department of Justice investigation into the shooting determined witnesses who corroborated Wilson's account were credible while those who contradicted Wilson's account were not. The witnesses that claimed Brown was surrendering or did not move toward Wilson were not credible; the report said their claims were inconsistent with the physical evidence, other witness statements, and in some cases prior statements from the same witness. No witness statements that pointed to Wilson's guilt were determined to be credible. Twenty-four statements were determined to lack any credibility, while eight which were found credible corroborated Wilson's account. Nine did not completely contradict nor corroborate Wilson's account. Several witnesses reported fear of reprisals from the community for providing evidence that corroborated Wilson's account.

=== Wilson's interview and testimony ===
Bruising on Wilson's face after the shooting

Officer Wilson gave his account of the incident in an interview with a detective on August 10, and in testimony before the grand jury in September. Wilson said he had just left a call involving a sick person when he heard on his radio that there was a theft in progress at a local convenience store. Wilson heard the description of the suspects and soon after observed two black males walking down the middle of the street. Wilson pulled up to them and told the two to walk on the sidewalk, and Johnson replied, "we're almost to our destination". As they passed Wilson's patrol SUV window, Brown said "fuck what you have to say".

Wilson then backed up about ten feet to where they were (Note: Wilson testified that he realized while driving on that Brown might be the suspect he had heard about on the radio. He had noticed Brown holding cigarillos and later looked at him again in his rear view mirror. Per Wilson, this was when he radioed his response that he was with two subjects on Canfield Drive, asked for assistance and backed up the vehicle to cut off Brown and Johnson.) and attempted to open his door. After backing up, Wilson told the two to "come here", and Brown told him in reply, "what the fuck are you gonna do". Wilson shut the door and Brown approached him and he opened the door again "trying to push him back", while telling him to get back. Brown "started swinging and punching at me from outside the vehicle", and Brown had his body against the door. Wilson said the first strike from Brown was a "glancing blow", and at that point he was trying to get Brown's arms out of his face. This was when Brown turned to his left and handed Johnson several packs of the stolen cigarillos he had been holding. Wilson then grabbed Brown's right arm trying to get control, but Brown hit him in the face. Wilson said he "felt like a 5-year-old holding onto Hulk Hogan" while he attempted to restrain Brown when he reached through his police car window. Wilson said it "jarred" him back and he yelled at Brown numerous times to stop and get back. Wilson said he thought about using his mace and his baton, but he was unable to reach either of them. He then drew his weapon and pointed it at Brown and told him to stop or he would shoot him, while ordering him to the ground.

According to Wilson, Brown then said "you're too much of a fucking pussy to shoot me" and grabbed for his gun and twisted it, pointing it at him, into his hip area. Wilson placed his left hand against Brown's hand and his other hand on the gun and pushed forward with both his arms. The gun was somewhat lined up with Brown, and Wilson pulled the trigger twice, but the weapon failed to discharge. On the next try, the gun fired and Brown then attempted to hit him multiple times inside his vehicle. Wilson shot at Brown again, but missed, and Brown took off running east, while Wilson exited his vehicle and radioed for backup. Wilson followed Brown, yelling for him to stop and get on the ground, but he kept running. Brown eventually stopped and turned and made a "grunting noise" and started running at him with his right hand under his shirt in his waistband. Brown ignored Wilson's commands to stop and get on the ground, so Wilson fired multiple shots at him, paused, and yelled at him to get on the ground again, but Brown was still charging at him and had not slowed down. Wilson then fired another set of shots, but Brown was still running at him. When Brown was about eight to ten feet away, Wilson fired more shots, with one of those hitting Brown in the head, which brought him down with his hand still in his waistband. Wilson said two patrol cars showed up approximately fifteen to twenty seconds after the final shot. When his supervisor arrived, he was sent to the police station.

Wilson told detectives Brown had reached his right hand into his waistband and that the hand still appeared to be in the waistband after Brown was shot. The medical investigator at the scene of the shooting did not take any photographs and testified to the grand jury that Brown's left hand was under his dead body, near the waistband, and the right hand was extended outwards.

On November 26, Wilson gave his first public interview about the shooting to ABC News' George Stephanopoulos.

=== Corroborating Wilson's testimony ===
Numerous witness accounts were consistent with Wilson's account and also agreed with the physical evidence at hand. Many witnesses corroborated that Wilson acted in self-defense during the event. A number of the witnesses who corroborated Wilson's account of events expressed fear and apprehension in testifying, saying they had been harassed or threatened by individuals from the Ferguson community. The following are a sample of the witnesses whose accounts aligned with Wilson's testimony.

Witness 102 was a 27-year-old biracial male. He said he saw Wilson chase Brown until Brown abruptly turned around. Brown did not put his hands up in surrender but made some type of movement similar to pulling his pants up or a shoulder shrug and then made a full charge at Wilson. Witness 102 thought Wilson's life was threatened and he only fired shots when Brown was coming toward him.

After the shooting, Witness 102 remained in the neighborhood for a short period of time, and corrected a couple of people who claimed Wilson "stood over [Brown] and shot while [he was] on the ground". In response, Witness 102 said Wilson shot Brown because Brown came back toward Wilson. Witness 102 "kept thinking" Wilson's shots were "missing" Brown because Brown kept moving. Witness 102 did not stay in the neighborhood for long, and left the area shortly afterward because he felt uncomfortable. According to the witness, "crowds of people had begun to gather, wrongly claiming the police shot Brown for no reason and that he had his hands up in surrender.” Two black women approached Witness 102, mobile phones set to record, asking him to recount what he had witnessed. Witness 102 responded that they would not like what he had to say. The women responded with racial slurs, calling him names like 'white motherfucker'."

Witness 103, a 58-year-old black male, testified that from his parked truck he saw "Brown punching Wilson at least three times in the facial area, through the open driver's window of the SUV... Wilson and Brown [had] hold of each other's shirts, but Brown was 'getting in a couple of blows [on Wilson]'." Wilson was leaning back toward the passenger seat with his forearm up, in an effort to block the blows. Then Witness 103 heard a gunshot and Brown took off running. Wilson exited the SUV, appeared to be using his shoulder microphone to call into his radio, and chased Brown with his gun held low ... Brown came to a stop near a car, put his hand down on the car, and turned around to face Wilson. Brown's hands were then down at his sides. Witness 103 did not see Brown's hands up. Wanting to leave, Witness 103 began to turn his car around in the opposite direction that Brown had been running when he heard additional shots. Witness 103 turned to his right, and saw Brown "moving fast" toward Wilson. Witness 103 then drove away."

Witness 104, a 26-year-old biracial female, witnessed the end of the altercation from a minivan:

[Witness 104] saw Brown run from the SUV, followed by Wilson, who "hopped" out of the SUV and ran after him while yelling "stop, stop, stop". Wilson did not fire his gun as Brown ran from him. Brown then turned around and "for a second" began to raise his hands as though he may have considered surrendering, but then quickly "balled up in fists" in a running position and "charged" at Wilson. Witness 104 described it as a "tackle run", explaining Brown "wasn't going to stop". Wilson fired his gun only as Brown charged at him, backing up as Brown came toward him. Witness 104 explained there were three separate volleys of shots. Each time, Brown ran toward Wilson, Wilson fired, Brown paused, Wilson stopped firing, and then Brown charged again. The pattern continued until Brown fell to the ground, "smashing" his face upon impact. Wilson did not fire while Brown momentarily had his hands up. Witness 104 explained it took some time for Wilson to fire, adding that she "would have fired sooner". Wilson did not go near Brown's body after Brown fell to his death.

Witness 108, a 74-year-old black male, told detectives the police officer was "in the right" and "did what he had to do", and that statements made by people in the apartment complex about Brown surrendering were inaccurate. Witness 108 later told investigators he "would have fucking shot that boy, too", and mimicked the aggressive stance Brown made while charging Wilson. He explained Wilson told Brown to "stop" or "get down" at least ten times, but instead Brown "charged" at Wilson. Witness 108 also told detectives there were other witnesses on Canfield Drive who saw what he saw.

Witness 109, a 53-year-old black male, said he decided to come forward after seeing Dorian Johnson "lie" about the events on television. He said when Wilson asked the two boys to get out of the street, Brown responded something to the effect of "Fuck the police." Afterward, Wilson got out of his car and Brown hit him in the face. Witness 109 said he saw Wilson reach for his taser but dropped it and then grabbed a gun, after which Brown grabbed for Wilson's gun. According to 109, at one point Brown ran away from Wilson, but turned around and charged toward the officer. He said Wilson fired in self-defense, and did not appear to be shooting to kill at first.

Witness 113, a 31-year-old black female, made statements that corroborated Wilson's account. She said she was afraid of the "neighborhood backlash" that might come from her testimony, and feared offering an account contrary to the narrative reported by the media that Brown held his hands up in surrender. She also told investigators she thought Wilson's life was in danger.

Witness 136 was in his apartment using a video chat application on his mobile phone while the shooting occurred. After hearing the first few shots, he recorded the remainder of his chat on his phone and turned it over to the FBI. The recording is about 12 seconds long and captured a total of 10 gunshots. The gunshots begin after the first four seconds. The recording captured six gunshots in two seconds. After a three-second pause, a seventh gunshot is heard. A pause of less than one second gave way to the final three-shot volley within two seconds. The recording was not time-stamped. As detailed below, this recording is consistent with several credible witness accounts as well as Wilson's account, that he fired several volleys of shots, briefly pausing between each one.

=== Contradicting Wilson's testimony ===
Several witnesses who originally testified against Wilson were also interviewed by the prosecution. They admitted to lying under oath as to the truthfulness of their testimony. At least one witness took an account from a newspaper; this witness was later discredited by investigators during the process.

Witness 22, who originally claimed she saw Wilson kill Brown in cold blood, admitted she lied to investigators and never saw the incident at all. She said she was just passing along information which her boyfriend told her he saw. The court transcript reads:

Prosecution: You gave two statements, were both of those statements true? Witness 22: No. I just felt like I want to be part of something... I didn't see what I told the FBI what [sic] I saw.

Prosecutors also played the grand jury a 10-minute police interview with a man who claimed to have witnessed the shooting. They then played a phone call in which that man admitted he actually had not seen the incident at all. Another witness insisted another officer was with Wilson at the time of the shooting. By all other accounts, Wilson was the only officer present when he shot Brown. This witness described having a clear view of what transpired despite there being a building between the witness' location and where the incident took place.

Witness 35 said Brown was "on his knees" when Wilson shot him in the head. Under questioning, his testimony fell apart, and he admitted fabricating it.

Prosecution: What you are saying you saw isn't forensically possible based on the evidence. Are you telling us that the only thing that's true about all of your statements before this is that you saw that police officer shoot him at point blank range? Witness 35: Yes.

Another witness described Brown on his hands and knees pleading for his life. After a prosecutor confronted the witness and told them what they had seen was not forensically possible based on the evidence, the witness later asked to leave.

Another witness—number 37—testified that, during a confrontation at Wilson's vehicle, Wilson shot Brown point blank in the chest—but Brown did not fall over and was not clearly bleeding as he ran away. This witness gave several different accounts of how many shots were fired. While he was further pressed for answers as to the truthfulness of his statements, he instead posed questions in return, refusing to elaborate on his statements.

Prosecution: You told three different stories in the time we've been here today. So I want to know which one is really your memory or did you see this at all? Witness 37: If none of my stuff is making any sense, like why do y'all keep contacting me?

=== Dorian Johnson ===
Johnson, a friend of Brown, who was with him that day, gave his account of the incident to media outlets in August. In media interviews, Johnson said Wilson pulled up beside them and said, "Get the fuck on the sidewalk." The young men replied they were "not but a minute away from [their] destination, and [they] would shortly be out of the street". (Note: Johnson lived in the adjacent apartment complex and was neighbors with Brown, who was living with a relative at the time.) Wilson drove forward without saying anything further and abruptly backed up, positioning his vehicle crosswise in their path. Wilson then allegedly tried to open his door aggressively and the door ricocheted off Brown and Johnson's bodies and closed back on Wilson. Wilson, still in his vehicle, purportedly grabbed Brown around his neck using his left hand through the open window, and Brown tried to pull away, but Wilson is said to have continued to pull Brown toward him "like tug of war". Johnson noted that Brown had the upper hand over Wilson owing to his position relative to the seated Wilson, his size advantage and because Wilson was only grabbing him with one hand. Johnson said Brown "did not reach for the officer's weapon at all", and was attempting to get free, when Wilson drew his weapon and said, "I'll shoot you" or "I'm going to shoot", and fired his weapon hitting Brown. Following the initial gunshot, Brown freed himself, and the two are said to have fled. Wilson exited the vehicle, and allegedly fired several rounds at the fleeing Brown, hitting him once in the back. Johnson said Brown then turned around with his hands raised and said, "I don't have a gun. Stop shooting!" Wilson is said to have then shot Brown several more times, killing him.

In his testimony in September to the grand jury, Johnson said he and Brown had walked to a convenience store to buy cigarillos, but Brown instead reached over the counter and took them and shoved a clerk on his way out the door. Johnson testified that on their walk back home, Brown had the cigarillos in his hands in plain sight and two Ferguson police cars passed them, but did not stop. When Wilson encountered them, he told the two to "get the fuck on the sidewalk" and Johnson told him they would be off the street shortly as they were close to their destination. Johnson testified Wilson was the aggressor from the beginning and that for no apparent reason, he backed his vehicle up and tried to open his door, but Brown shut it, preventing him from getting out. Johnson said Wilson then reached out and grabbed Brown by the neck and the two were engaged in a "tug of war", Wilson's left hand progressively slipping from Brown's neck to his right arm. Brown braced himself on the vehicle's door with his left arm, which Johnson believed Wilson may have grabbed with his right arm at one point. Wilson drew his gun with his right hand and said "I'll shoot". Johnson said he never saw Brown hit Wilson and did not think Brown grabbed for Wilson's gun, although he admitted the possibility that Brown's left arm could have been inside the vehicle while Johnson wasn't looking. Following a gunshot, Johnson said they both ran (Note: Johnson said that Brown told him to "keep running, bro" as he passed Johnson, who had outpaced Brown and decided first to hide among stopped vehicles by crouching and then to try to enter one.) and Wilson fired while Brown was running away, Brown turned around and "at that time Big Mike's hands was up, but not so much in the air, because he had been struck". Johnson told the jurors Brown said "I don't have a gun", was mad and tried to say again "I don't have a gun", but "before he can say the second sentence or before he can even get it out, that's when the several more shots came." In his testimony, Johnson maintained Brown did not run at Wilson prior to the fatal shots.

The Department of Justice concluded that Johnson's testimony was not credible due to its inconsistencies with evidence, internal inconsistencies and lack of corroboration by credible witness accounts. The DOJ was also skeptical that Johnson would have been in a position to witness the final shots, and believed that Johnson may have fled the scene prior or had his back to the shooting while seeking cover.

At around 8:30 am on September 7, 2025, Johnson died during a shooting at the age of 33.

=== Other witness accounts ===
Nine witness testimonies were judged by the Department of Justice as neither fully supportive nor inculpating of Wilson. One, that of witness 107, who was seated in the same minivan as witness 104, reported that Wilson was standing outside the passenger side of his vehicle at the time that Brown started to run away. Unlike witness 104, witness 107 was uncertain whether Brown subsequently charged at Wilson. Witness 107 reported that Wilson shot Brown while Brown was running away, and that the last shots were fired while Wilson was 10 to 15 feet away from Brown. The investigators reported that witness 107 was visibly shaken at what she had witnessed, which may have contributed to inconsistencies in her testimony.

Witness 106, the driver of the minivan, disagreed with witness 107 that Brown had put his hands up before moving toward Wilson. Brown's gesture was instead characterized by this witness as Brown having "briefly flung" out his arms. However, the view witness 106 had of Brown was partially obstructed by Wilson's body.

Witnesses 110 and 111 were interviewed on the evening of the incident and were shaken; witness 111 was crying. Witnesses 110 and 111 both witnessed the shooting, first from a driveway and then a balcony. They had passed Brown and Johnson walking on the street while in a vehicle en route to the house. They saw Wilson backing his vehicle up to block Brown and Johnson, but could not see what went on in the vehicle because they were watching from the passenger side. Johnson disappeared at the first shot, and Brown and Wilson continued to grapple until a second shot was fired and Brown ran away. Witness 110 observed Brown stopping, looking at his bloodied left hand, putting his arms out to his sides in a "what the heck" gesture and turning and going toward Wilson with his hands in the same posture. Witness 110 initially stated that Brown moved "quickly" back toward Wilson, though witness 110 later denied that Brown had been charging or running at Wilson to the grand jury and could not provide a characterization of Brown's movement. According to witness 111, it seemed that Brown was moving "in slow motion" toward Wilson.

Witness 115 recorded on their cell phone video of the incident that "dude [Brown] was all up in his [Wilson's] car, dude [Brown] was punching on him." Witness 115 believed that Brown was winning in the fight, and from the vantage point of witness 115, was likely striking Wilson. There was a gap in witness 115's testimony as the shooting stopped, witness 115 went out onto their balcony, then went back inside to retrieve the phone, which they inadvertently left on their dresser, called out to family members and reemerged on the balcony. At this point, they saw Brown, whose arms were folded on his stomach, (Note: Witness 115 assumed that Brown had been shot in the stomach) walking back toward Wilson. Brown was reportedly not surrendering and did not have his hands up, but was falling to the ground as he approached Wilson. Wilson fired a series of shots, and Brown fell to the ground over one arm, with the other at his side. Wilson did not touch Brown's body and was speaking on a radio with his gun drawn.

Witness 114 saw Wilson stop his vehicle and lean out of the driver's window, perhaps to say something to Brown. Brown made a hand gesture. Wilson's vehicle continued on initially, but then was jerked back and parked at an angle. Witness 129 stated that this was to cut off Brown and Johnson.

Witness 116 looked out their blinds in response to screams. They saw Brown with his hands inside Wilson's vehicle. Witness 116 reported seeing Wilson use what they thought was a taser, but miss. (Note: Wilson testified that he was not carrying a taser, only mace, a flashlight, a retractable asp baton and a gun, none of which he considered to be viable options other than drawing the gun—mace because he believed he would incapacitate himself, the baton because it was holstered on his back and would have to be extended in close quarters and the flashlight because it was out of reach in a bag.) They then heard or saw Wilson fire a gun once or twice. Witness 116 saw Brown run away, and assumed that he had been apprehended. However, after hearing five or six additional gunshots, they looked out again to see Brown dead on the ground.

Witness 110 and 141 reported that Wilson only shot at Brown while Brown moved toward him, not while Brown was fleeing.

The DOJ concluded that they had identified no testimony that could inculpate Wilson that was consistent with other inculpating witness testimony, consistent with the prior statements of the witness and with the physical evidence.

== Early reaction and analysis ==
=== August 9–14 ===
Peaceful protests and civil disorder broke out the day following Brown's shooting and lasted for several days. This was in part due to the belief among many that Brown was surrendering, as well as longstanding racial tensions between the minority-black population and the majority-white city government and police. As the details of the original shooting event emerged from investigators, police grappled with establishing curfews and maintaining order, while members of the Ferguson community demonstrated in various ways in the vicinity of the original shooting. On August 10, a day of memorials began peacefully, but some crowd members became unruly after an evening candlelight vigil. Local police stations assembled approximately 150 officers in riot gear. Some people began looting businesses, vandalizing vehicles, and confronting police officers who sought to block off access to several areas of the city. Widespread media coverage examined the post-9/11 trend of local police departments arming themselves with military-grade weapons when dealing with protests. In the days following the shooting, state and federal officials weighed in on the matter. On August 12, President Barack Obama offered his condolences to Brown's family and community. On August 14, Senator Rand Paul of Kentucky said in an op-ed in Time Magazine, that the event was a tragedy and that police forces need to be demilitarized.

=== August 15–30 ===
On August 15, a report and video showing the robbery of a convenience store by Brown was released by the Ferguson Police Department. Brown was accompanied by his friend Dorian Johnson. The report and video were part of a packet that included information about the shooting afterward. The report containing frames of the surveillance footage showed Brown grabbing a box of cigarillos, followed by an apparent struggle or confrontation between Brown and a store clerk. The statutory deadline in the Sunshine Law, Missouri's equivalent of the federal Freedom of Information Act, was the cited reason for the release following requests by St. Louis Post-Dispatch, Judicial Watch and others.

The Department of Justice had urged the video not be released, saying a release would inflame tension. Missouri Governor Jay Nixon identified the release as an attempt to disparage Brown during the investigation that would inflame the community. Brown's family released a statement in which they condemn the way the police chief chose to disseminate information, calling it character assassination following the "execution-style murder" of their son.

The August 15 release of information was criticized as part of an erratic and infrequent release of information by the police. Previously, the police withheld the name of the officer involved in the shooting, citing safety concerns following death threats against the unnamed officer. The St Louis County Police incident report lacked details. The Ferguson Police incident report was obtained by the ACLU after a request and subsequent lawsuit. Wilson did not file an incident report and there was no Ferguson Police use-of-force report related to the incident. The Ferguson Police Department refused to commit to a deadline for releasing a full autopsy report.

When the report and video were released, the police said Wilson had known Brown was a suspect in the robbery. In a media conference, Ferguson's chief of police Tom Jackson said the robbery was unrelated to the initial contact, and had nothing to do with Wilson stopping Brown and Johnson. Jackson later clarified Wilson recognized Brown as a suspect because he saw a box of cigars in his hand. Eugene O'Donnell, a former district attorney in New York City who now serves as a professor at the John Jay College of Criminal Justice, said, while the police officer may have stopped Brown for jaywalking, Brown may have been thinking the officer knew about the robbery: "Obviously the cop's reaction is not affected, but what could be affected is [Brown's] reaction to the cop."

A Pew Research Center Survey published on August 18 suggested differences in American public opinion between whites and blacks. It indicated 80% of blacks and 37% of whites believed the shooting "raises important issues about race".

On August 24, St. Louis held their annual Peace Fest, which had a particular focus on Mike Brown. In attendance was Mike Brown's father, Mike Brown Sr., as well as the parents of Trayvon Martin (an unarmed black teen who was shot and killed in Florida in 2012).

In August, Chief Jackson said Wilson had been injured in the incident. Wilson's medical record shows his injuries were diagnosed as a facial contusion or bruise.

Brown's funeral was held on August 25 and was attended by an estimated 4,500 people. Al Sharpton delivered one of two eulogies.

=== September – November 24 ===
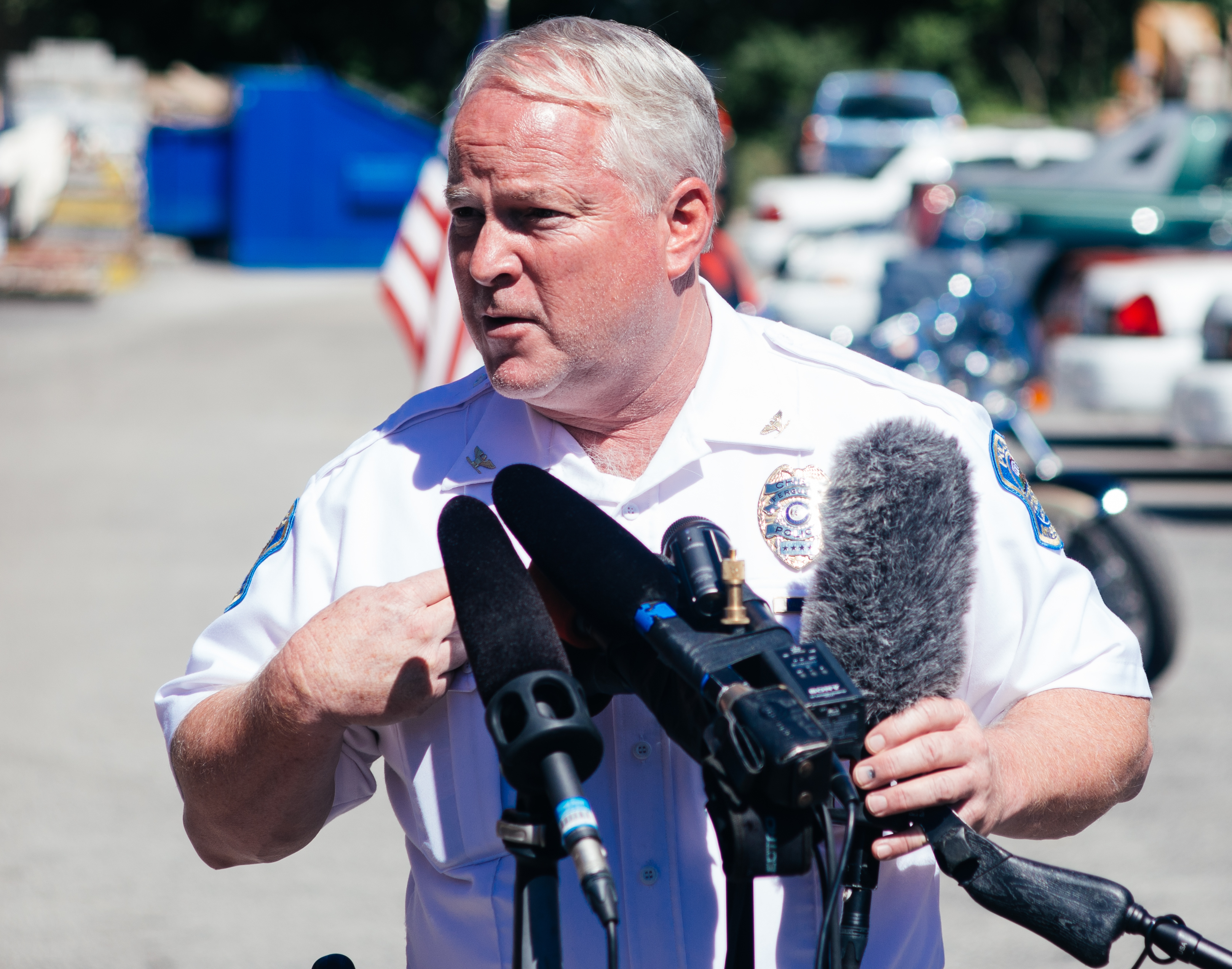
Ferguson Police Chief Tom Jackson at the news conference

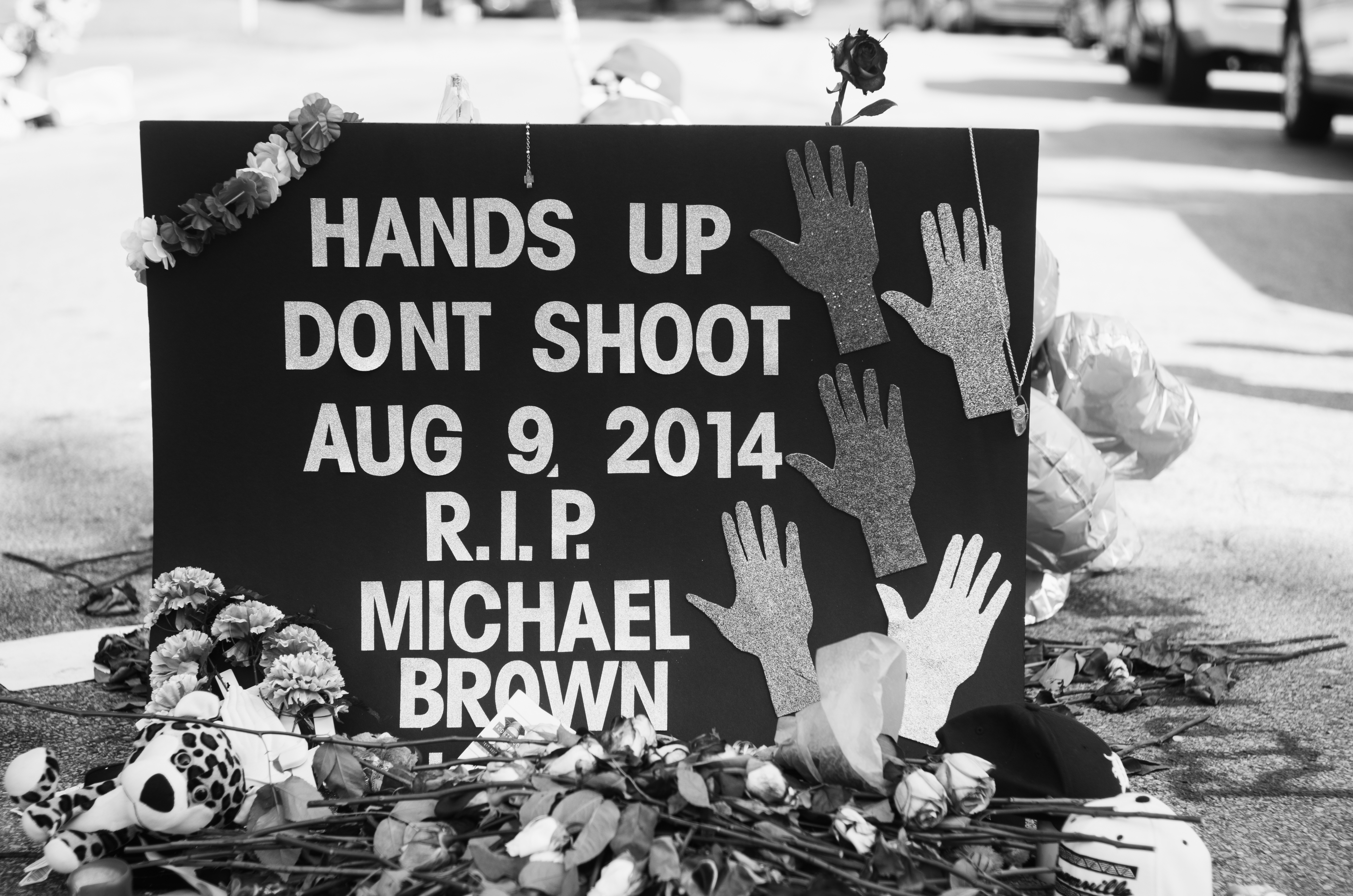
A makeshift memorial placed during protests

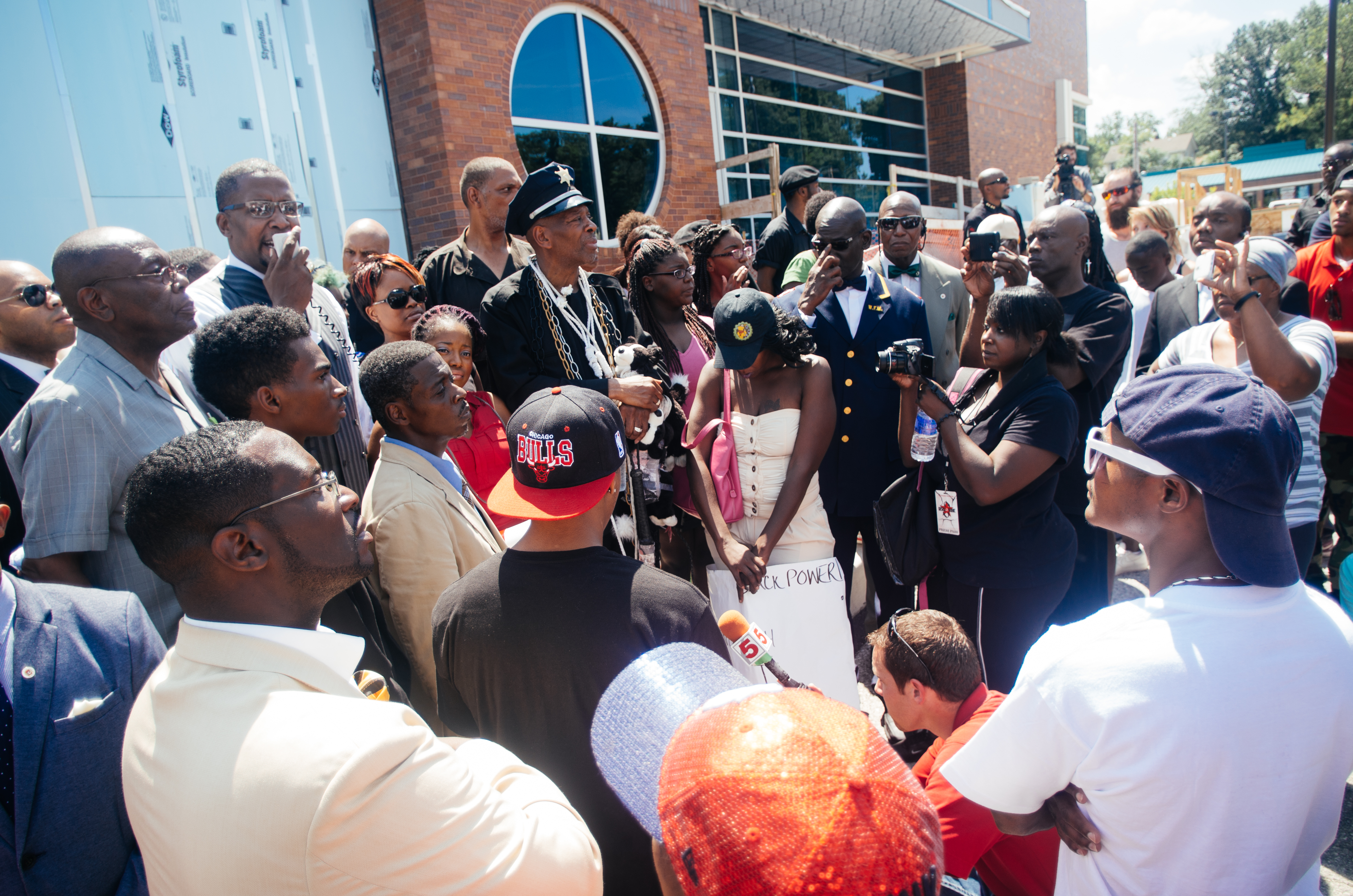
Protesters gather at the Ferguson police department

On October 22, anonymous sources leaked to the St. Louis Post-Dispatch what they described as Wilson's grand jury testimony. The Justice Department issued a statement that it "considers the selective release of information in this investigation to be irresponsible and highly troubling. Since the release of the convenience-store footage, there seems to be an inappropriate effort to influence public opinion about this case." Wilson's defense team denied they were behind the leaks, saying they "[were] not in possession of any of the disclosed reports or the investigative report". The St. Louis County prosecutor spokesperson said his office would not investigate the leaks because they could not force journalists to divulge their sources, and "you can tell by the information they have that the leaks are not coming from the grand jury or the prosecutor's office." The leaks concerning grand jury testimony were condemned by the Justice Department as inappropriate effort to influence public opinion about this case. The leaks referred to evidence supporting Wilson's testimony and decreased the likelihood of an indictment whilst fanning the flames of angry protesters.

=== November 24 – early December ===
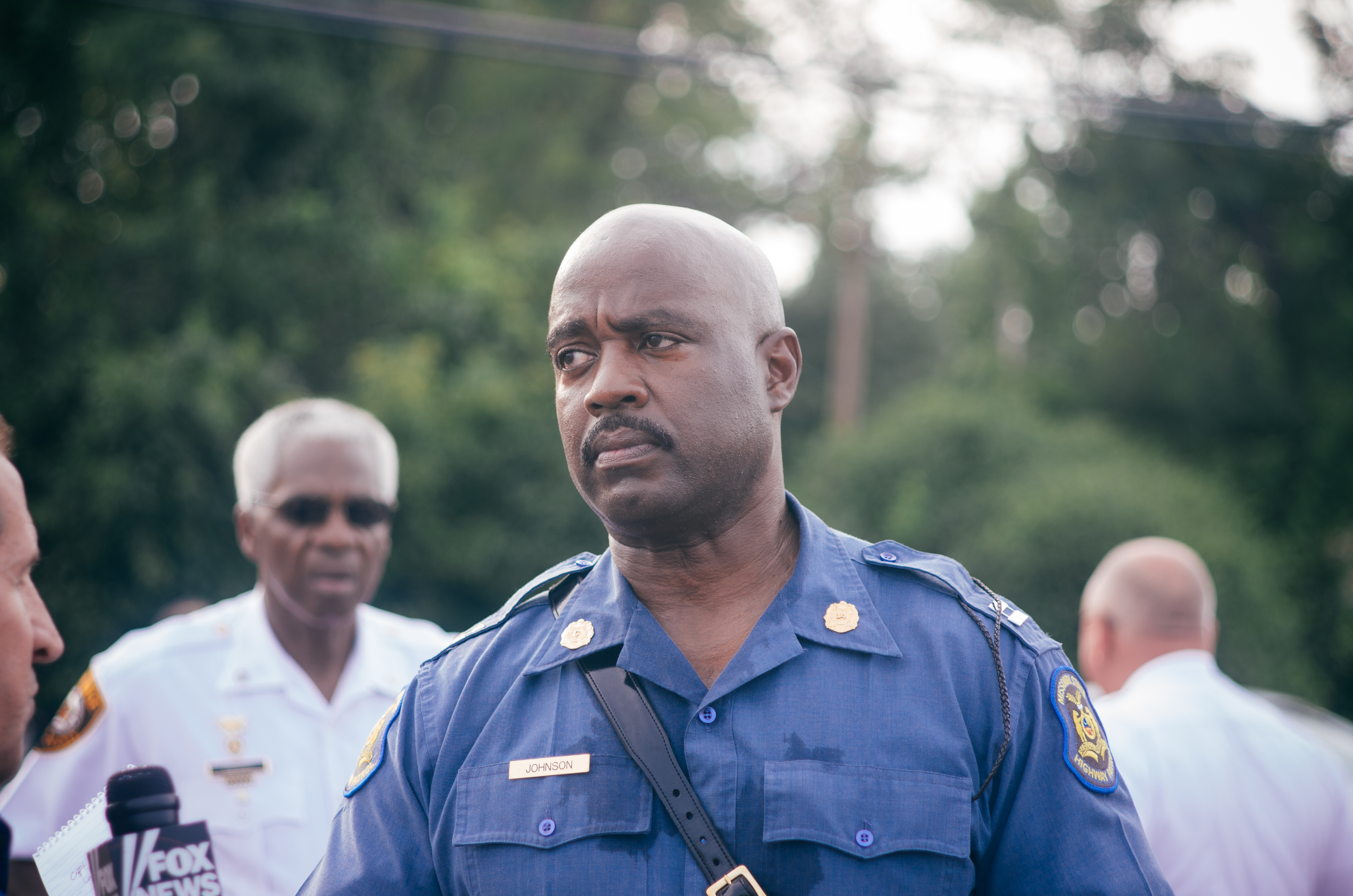
Missouri Highway Patrol Captain Ronald Johnson was asked to take over policing of Ferguson, as a tactical shift to reduce the violence

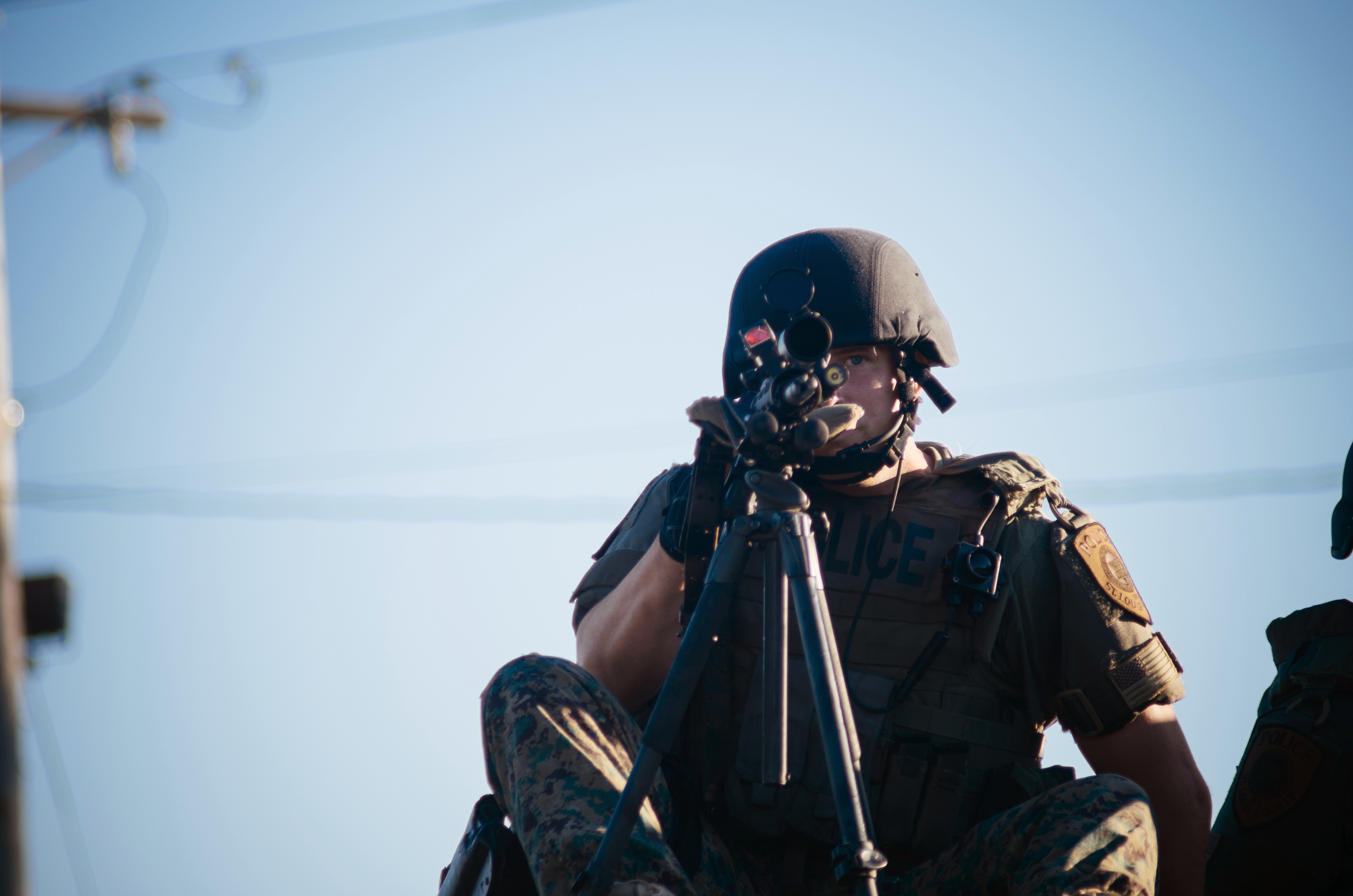
Police sharpshooter atop a SWAT vehicle during protests at Ferguson

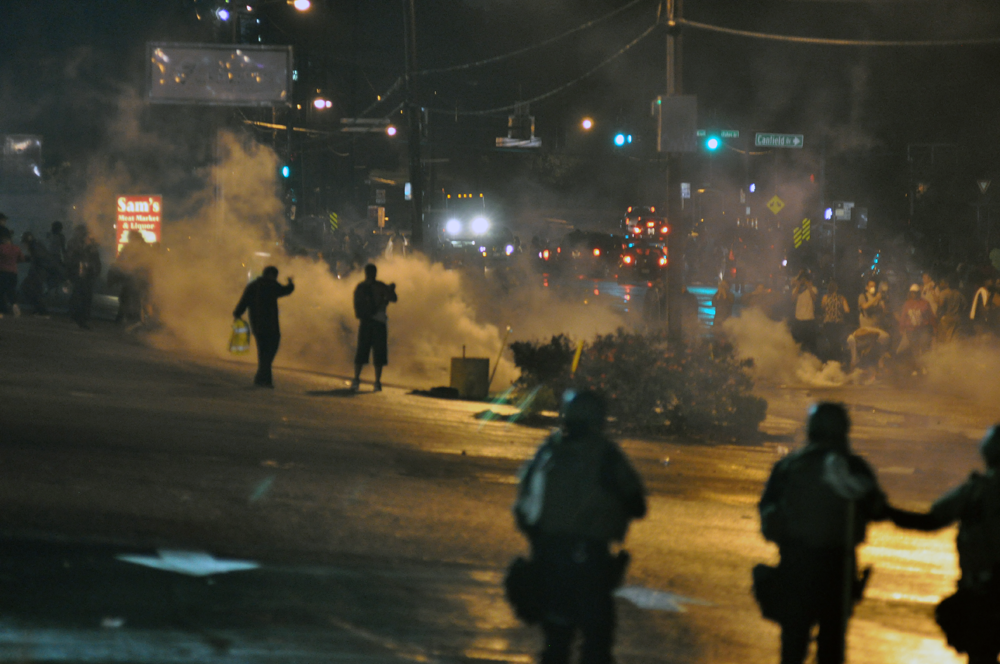
Clashes between police and protesters

Following the grand jury announcement, protests, some of them violent, broke out in Ferguson and other cities across the United States. Several Ferguson businesses were looted and fires set by protesters. Protests erupted in 170 cities across the U.S., including St Louis, Philadelphia, Seattle, Albuquerque, New York City, Cleveland, Los Angeles, Oakland, Minneapolis, Atlanta, Chicago, and Boston. Numerous media reports and legal experts criticized the process for failing to return an indictment in cases concerning law enforcement officers.

A December 2014 opinion poll by Washington Post-ABC News showed a majority of blacks do not believe that they receive treatment equal to whites by the police or the criminal justice system. Six out of ten white Americans believe the police treat races equally with roughly half of white Americans believing the criminal justice provides equal treatment, but there is a sharp partisan divide between white Americans. Conservative or Republican white Americans are far more likely to say whites and blacks receive equal treatment in the justice system than the liberal or Democratic white Americans. (Note: The poll was conducted December 11–15, 2014, with a random national sample of 1,012 adults with an overall margin of error of 3.5 percentage points, but an error margin of 11 points for results among African Americans and Hispanics.)

=== March 2015 ===
On March 4, the U.S. Department of Justice announced Wilson would not be charged in the shooting. Its report said "[t]here is no evidence upon which prosecutors can rely to disprove Wilson's stated subjective belief that he feared for his safety," and that accounts that Brown put his hands up are "inaccurate because they are inconsistent with the physical and forensic evidence".

President Obama reacted to the announcement, stating, "The finding that was made [by the Department of Justice] was that it was not unreasonable to determine that there was not sufficient evidence to charge Officer Wilson. That was an objective, thorough, independent federal investigation." He further added, "We may never know exactly what happened. But Officer Wilson like anybody else who is charged with a crime benefits from due process and a reasonable doubt standard."

=== June – July 2015 ===
In a Gallup Poll taken in June and July 2015, 8% of black respondents answered that local police treat racial minorities "very fairly" while 44% of black respondents answered "fairly". In contrast, 29% of non-Hispanic white respondents answered that local police treat racial minorities "very fairly" while 49% of non-Hispanic white respondents answered "fairly". In the same poll, 38% of black respondents and 18% of non-Hispanic white respondents indicated a preference for "greater police presence in their local communities."

=== International reactions ===
Various heads of state and foreign news organizations have commented on the shooting and subsequent protests including the Chinese Xinhua News Agency, Germany's Der Spiegel, Egypt's Ministry of Foreign affairs, the Iranian Islamic Republic News Agency, protesters throughout the Middle East, the Russian Foreign Ministry, Spain's El Mundo, the British Metro, and others.

Amnesty International (AI) sent a team of human rights observers, trainers, and researchers to Ferguson. It was the first time the organization deployed such a team in the United States. In a press release, AI USA director Steven W. Hawkins said, "The U.S. cannot continue to allow those obligated and duty-bound to protect to become those who their community fears most." On October 24, AI published a report declaring human rights abuses in Ferguson. The report cited the use of lethal force in Brown's death, racial discrimination and excessive use of police force, imposition of restrictions on the rights to protest, intimidation of protesters, the use of tear gas, rubber bullets, and long range acoustic devices, restrictions imposed on the media covering the protests, and lack of accountability for law enforcement policing protests.

== Reactions to grand jury decision ==
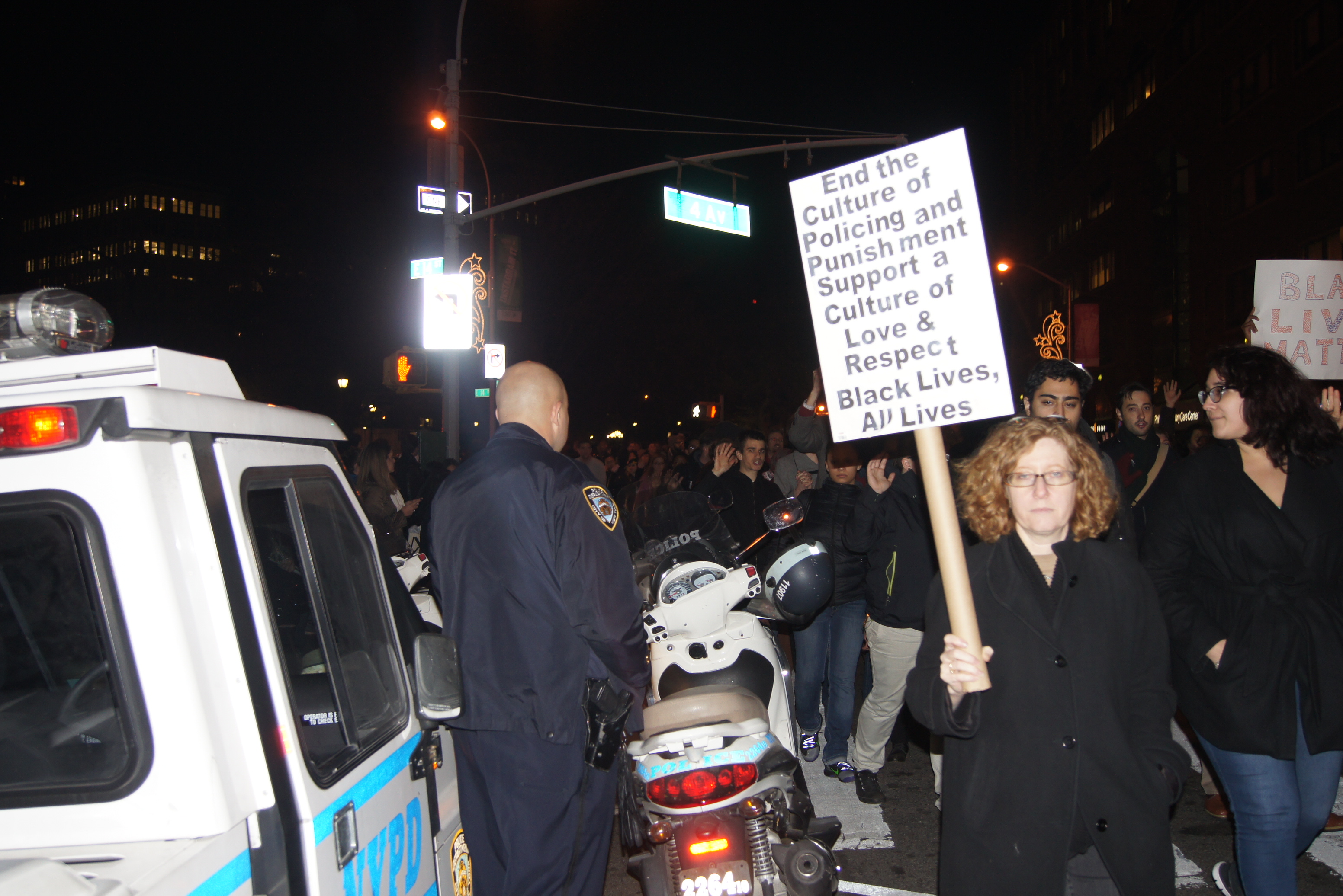
Protesters react the day following the grand jury decision in Union Square, Manhattan in New York City.

The grand jury process was atypical because of significant and numerous departures from other normal grand jury proceedings. The American grand jury process operates in secret, with the proceedings, evidence and testimony rarely being released to the public in cases of no indictment. From the beginning, McCulloch desired to provide transparency to the process and had the proceeding transcribed with the intention of releasing the materials to the public if there was no indictment. Paul Cassell, former U.S. federal judge, said the investigative grand jury was unique because they were investigating with no assurance that any criminal conduct was present, in contrast to normal grand jury proceedings which have been screened for probable cause by a prosecutor. McCulloch's intentions to present all the evidence resulted in the proceedings which took far longer than regular grand juries which decide within days.

Earlier in the hearing, the prosecution presented a 1979 Missouri statute allowing officers to use deadly force "to effect the arrest or prevent the escape from custody [of a person]". Before the grand jury deliberated, jurors were told to disregard the previous instructions and use case law from the Tennessee v Garner ruling, which said it was unconstitutional for police officers to use deadly force to apprehend non-dangerous fleeing suspects. Missouri Attorney General Chris Koster, acknowledged the grand jury was given information based on the state law before being informed that deadly force cannot be used merely to prevent the escape of an unarmed suspect. MSNBC's Lawrence O'Donnell argued that this change amounted to a deliberate attempt by the prosecution to make it impossible to indict Wilson. Andrew F. Branca, a Massachusetts lawyer focusing on self-defense law, attributed O'Donnell's comments as a straw man because self-defense is a completely independent and sufficient justification for the use of deadly force. The St. Louis Public Radio later clarified that even if Wilson was indicted and convicted at trial based on the Garner ruling, the conviction could be challenged on the basis that Missouri law permitted the use of deadly force.

The prosecution's handling of the case received particular attention. Roger Parloff said prosecutors do not usually exclude truly exculpatory evidence and that prosecutors do not typically indict if they believe the accused is not guilty, disagreeing with the notion that McCulloch should have presented evidence with the purpose of obtaining an indictment. Jay Sterling Silver said the grand jury case indicated a conflict of interest between local prosecutors and police, as the former needs to maintain a good relationship with law enforcement. Mark O'Mara said the unusual process was to avoid arguments that the presentation was to effect a particular result, yet despite this McCulloch was still criticized for the decision. Paul Callan, former deputy chief of homicide in the Brooklyn District Attorney's Office, gave a layered response which asserted the choice to present all the evidence was unusual, but not unprecedented in controversial cases. Callan said some prosecutors use the grand jury process as political cover in cases which would not succeed at trial, and in cases in which subsequent investigations and civil lawsuits would raise further criticism. William Fitzpatrick, of the National District Attorneys Association, said it was not strange for prosecutors in police-involved cases to provide all available evidence and not ask for a specific charge and defended McCulloch's inclusion of evidence. Jeffrey Toobin agreed the exoneration may have been well-justified because a conviction would have been very unlikely at a trial, but the process that was used does not inspire confidence in the legal system. In a later interview, McCulloch defended the choice to include all evidence and not skew the presentation just for the sake of getting an indictment.

The New York Times described prosecutors' questioning of Wilson as "gentle" and said it contrasted with the sharp challenges to witnesses whose accounts seemed to contradict Wilson's, and reported this had led some to question whether the process was as objective as McCulloch had claimed. The Times reported prosecutors asked witness after witness if Brown appeared to be reaching for a weapon when confronting Wilson, though few of them said this. Furthermore, contradictions in testimony by Wilson and other law-enforcement officers were left unchallenged by prosecutors. CNN legal analyst Sunny Hostin criticized the prosecutors for asking softball questions during the cross examination of Wilson's testimony, and referred particularly to the fact that no witness could corroborate Wilson's story that he had warned Brown twice to lie down on the ground, and when asked, witnesses said they did not hear him say that.

After the grand jury's decision was announced, Brown's stepfather, Louis Head, turned to a crowd of demonstrators who had gathered, and yelled "Burn this motherfucker down" and "Burn this bitch down", according to a New York Times video. Moments before, he had said "If I get up [on the platform] I'm gonna start a riot." He later apologized for the outburst.

== Aftermath ==
The site on Canfield Drive in 2020

By September 24, Ferguson Police Chief Thomas Jackson publicly apologized to the family of Michael Brown. By March 12, five months later, Thomas Jackson resigned from the Ferguson Police Department. On November 29, Wilson resigned from the Ferguson police force with no severance, citing security concerns. Wilson's lawyer said Wilson "will never be a police officer again" as he does not want to put other officers at risk due to his presence. The National Bar Association, an organization of African American lawyers and judges, made a complaint to the Missouri Department of Public Safety demanding Wilson's police officer license be revoked. Wilson's attempts to obtain employment as a police officer have been unsuccessful.

President Barack Obama announced the federal government would spend $75 million on body cameras for law enforcement officers, as one of the measures taken in response to the shooting.

According to the Associated Press' annual poll of United States news directors and editors, the top news story of 2014 was police killings of unarmed black people—including the shooting of Brown—as well as their investigations and the protests in their aftermath.

Roger Goldman, emeritus professor at Saint Louis University Law School, Flanders, a Saint Louis University law professor, and Senator Jamilah Nasheed seek the updating of Missouri state law to comply with the 1985 U.S. Supreme Court decision, Tennessee v. Garner.

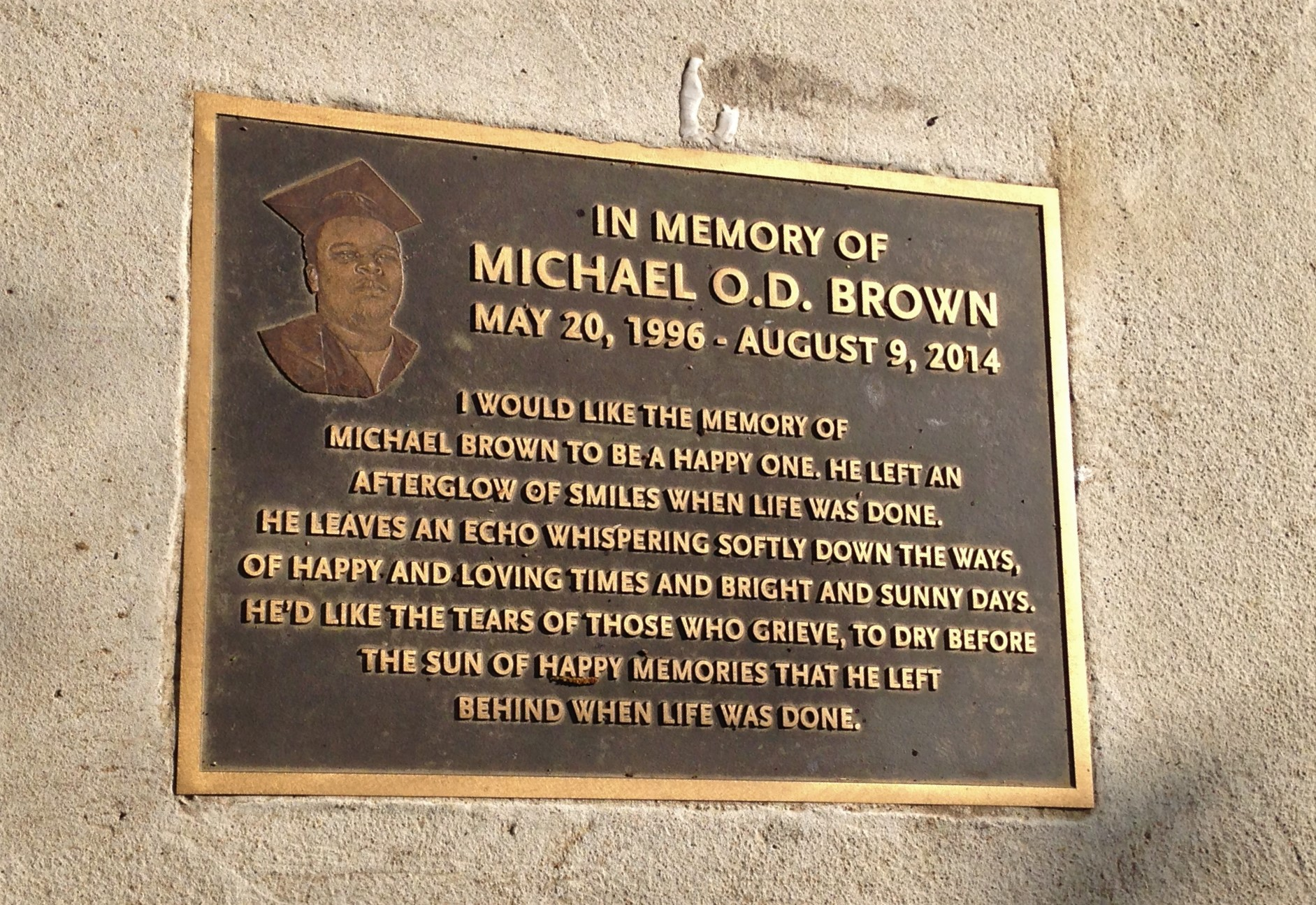
Bronze plaque in memory of Michael Brown on sidewalk where shooting incident occurred

The cover of The New Yorker's January 26, 2015, issue depicted Martin Luther King Jr. linking arms with Eric Garner and Wenjian Liu, and joined by Trayvon Martin and Brown.

Funds for the Brown family and for Wilson were solicited on the internet, each accumulating hundreds of thousands of dollars in donations.

In August 2018, Prosecuting Attorney Bob McCulloch lost re-election to reformist Wesley Bell by double-digit margins, ending McCulloch's 28-year incumbency.

=== Destruction of QuikTrip ===
The QuikTrip where Michael Brown had a confrontation with a clerk (which led to the police call) was looted and burned the next day, along with other stores in the neighborhood. Rather than rebuilding, the corporation donated the site to the Urban League of Metropolitan St. Louis and the Salvation Army. The organizations built the Ferguson Community Empowerment Center on the site, which opened in 2017. The Urban League began suburban street outreach for the first time, and is also redeveloping other vacant lots.

=== Ferguson Effect ===
The Ferguson effect is an increase in violent crime rates in a community caused by reduced proactive policing due to the community's distrust and hostility towards police. The Ferguson effect was first proposed after police saw an increase in violence following the shooting of Brown in Ferguson, Missouri. The term was coined by Doyle Sam Dotson III, the chief of the St. Louis police, to account for an increased murder rate in some U.S. cities following the Ferguson unrest.

=== "Hands up, don't shoot" ===
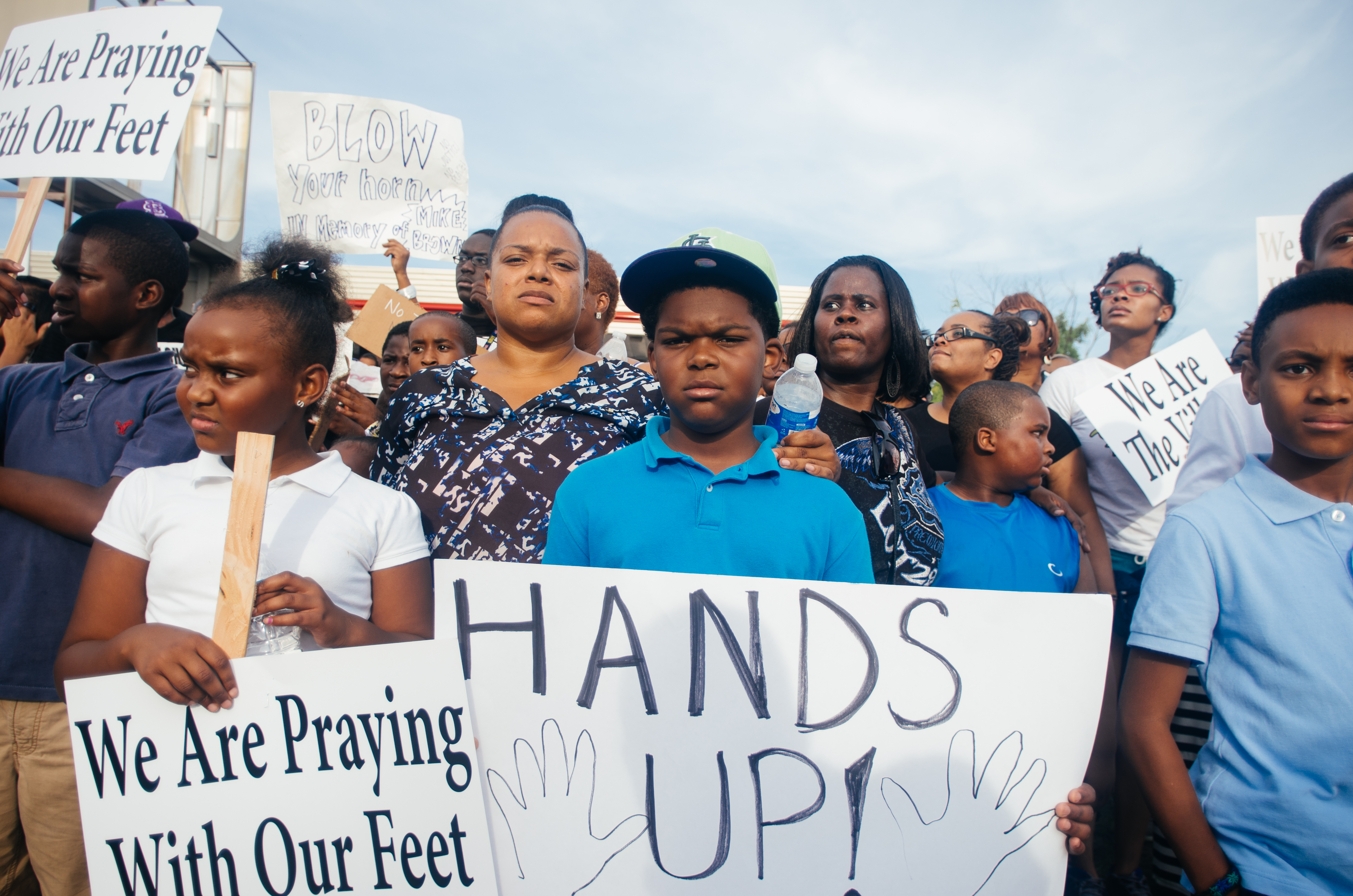
"Hands up!" sign displayed at a Ferguson protest

"Hands up, don't shoot", or simply "hands up", is a slogan and gesture originating from the incident and was seen in demonstrations in Ferguson and throughout the United States. The gesture, which was based mainly on Dorian Johnson's account of the shooting, became a rallying cry against police violence.

On March 4, 2015, the U.S. Department of Justice issued a report on the shooting, which said, "There is no witness who has stated that Brown had his hands up in surrender whose statement is otherwise consistent with the physical evidence" and "our investigation did not reveal any eyewitness who stated that Brown said 'don't shoot'."

=== Related incidents ===
On December 20, two NYPD officers were shot and killed in their police car in Bedford–Stuyvesant, Brooklyn. The suspected gunman, Ismaaiyl Brinsley, posted days earlier on Instagram his intention to kill police officers in response to the killings of Brown and Eric Garner. The suspect, who had a long criminal record and had shot his girlfriend in the stomach a few hours earlier, entered the New York City Subway and committed suicide.

On March 12, 2015, two police officers were wounded by gunfire outside the Ferguson police headquarters. The officers, one from nearby Webster Groves, the other from the St. Louis County Police, were providing security at a protest being staged outside the station. Two days later, 20-year-old Jeffrey L. Williams was arrested in connection with the shooting. Williams' attorney said, although Williams fired the shots, he was not aiming at the officers.

Eighteen-year-old Tyrone Harris (friend of Brown) was shot by police in Ferguson on August 9, 2015, one year after the shooting of Michael Brown. However, this shooting was determined to have happened after Harris shot at four St Louis County police officers who were in a police vehicle, with Harris also surviving after only being critically wounded and afterwards charged with four counts of assault on law enforcement in the first degree, five counts of armed criminal action, and one count of discharging or shooting a firearm at a motor vehicle. That same day, the Columbia (Missouri) Police Officers' Association (CPOA) proclaimed "Darren Wilson Day", calling Wilson an "innocent, but persecuted, officer" and insisted his ethnicity had nothing to do with their support of him. An ABC affiliate reported the post was shared nearly 60 times on the site before being removed. The CPOA then posted its support for Wilson and "all law enforcement officers who endure similar situations."

=== Task force on policing ===
In December 2014, president Barack Obama created a commission to make recommendations for broad police reform in the United States. The commission created by Obama released an interim report on March 2, 2015, with numerous recommendations, including the recommendation that policy be created mandating "external and independent criminal investigations in cases of police use of force resulting in death, officer-involved shootings resulting in injury or death, or in-custody deaths".

=== DOJ investigation into the Ferguson Police Department ===
On September 5, 2014, the U.S. Department of Justice began an investigation of the Ferguson, Missouri, police force to examine whether officers routinely engaged in racial profiling or showed a pattern of excessive force. The investigation was separate from the Department's other investigation of the shooting of Brown. The results of the investigation were released in a March 4, 2015, report, which concluded officers in Ferguson routinely violated the constitutional rights of the city's residents, by discriminating against African Americans and applying racial stereotypes, in a "pattern or practice of unlawful conduct within the Ferguson Police Department that violates the First, Fourth, and Fourteenth Amendments to the United States Constitution, and federal statutory law."

The report focused on the problem of issuing warrants for sometimes minor offenses. In many states, a chief cause for warrants is unpaid traffic tickets.

=== Brown family lawsuit ===
On April 23, 2015, the Brown family filed a wrongful death lawsuit in state court against Wilson, Jackson, and the City of Ferguson, asking for damages in excess of $75,000 as well as attorney's fees. On May 27, 2015, the lawsuit was moved from state court to federal court.

On July 14, 2015, U.S. District Judge E. Richard Webber responded to defense motions by dismissing four of the seven counts of the lawsuit and declining to dismiss two other counts. On June 20, 2017, Webber approved a settlement between Brown's parents and the city of Ferguson. Terms of the agreement, including the settlement amount, were sealed from the public. A Ferguson city attorney revealed the city's insurance company paid $1.5 million.

=== Dorian Johnson lawsuit ===
On April 29, 2015, Johnson filed a lawsuit in state court against Wilson, Jackson, and the City of Ferguson for being stopped by Wilson without probable cause, reasonable suspicion or legal justification to detain him. The lawsuit claimed that, according to the findings of the § DOJ investigation into the Ferguson Police Department, law enforcement efforts focused on generating revenue rather than protecting the town's citizens. Johnson sought US$25,000 in damages. On May 27, 2015, the lawsuit was moved from state court to federal court. The court denied the defendants' motion to dismiss the case; they appealed, and a three-judge panel of the Eighth Circuit Court of Appeals affirmed the district court on July 25, 2017, allowing the lawsuit to go forward. The en banc Eighth Circuit reviewed and reversed the panel's decision on June 17, 2019, directing the district court to dismiss the case.

=== Appointment of African-American police chiefs ===
On May 9, 2016, Delrish Moss, a Miami law enforcement veteran and expert in community relations, was sworn in as the first permanent African American chief in Ferguson. He said his challenges would include diversifying the police force and dramatically improving community relations. Moss resigned and returned to Miami in October 2018.

In 2023, Troy Doyle became the new police chief. According to Doyle, as a teenager growing up in northern St. Louis County, he was pulled over so many times on his commute that he bought a radar detector to avoid police. He says while he was stopped in a parking lot, a police officer pulled up and demanded identification for no apparent reason, noticed the radar detector, and took it without compensation after falsely stating it had shown up as stolen. Doyle says the incident is what inspired him to public service.

The police department went from having three African-American officers in 2014 to roughly half in 2024, with only four officers still on board who had been serving at the time of the Brown shooting.

=== Lezley McSpadden announces run for Ferguson City Council ===
On April 25, 2018, Brown's mother, Lezley McSpadden, announced to a Harvard University forum on police violence that she would run for City Council of Ferguson. She did not win.

== In popular culture ==
The same month Brown was shot dead, American rappers The Game, Rick Ross, 2 Chainz, Diddy, Fabolous, Wale, DJ Khaled, Swizz Beatz, Yo Gotti, Curren$y, Problem, King Pharoah and recording group TGT released the song "Don't Shoot" as a tribute to Brown.

On De L'Amour — his final studio album released before his death in 2017 — the French rock and roll singer Johnny Hallyday sings "Dans la peau de Mike Brown", a song against racial crimes and in memory of Mike Brown.

On November 28, 2014, musician and filmmaker Richard Rossi was in the news regarding the controversy over the shooting of Michael Brown. Rossi wrote and recorded a protest song expressing his feelings about a grand jury's decision not to charge a white police officer in the death of the unarmed black teen in Ferguson, Missouri. "I wrote the song in five minutes as a way to express my emotions about the danger of trigger-happy police," Rossi said. "I filmed it on my laptop at my kitchen table and uploaded it to YouTube." Rossi uploaded the video on November 26, and provided the song's lyrics in the video description. Here is a sample from the song's beginning, printed in the Los Angeles Daily News: "Down at the courthouse on a Monday afternoon/Justice was thrown right out the window when a young white cop entered the room."

In Prince's song about the 2015 Baltimore protests, "Baltimore", he sings "does anybody hear us pray for Michael Brown or Freddie Gray?".

In 2015, actor Ezra Miller directed a short film titled The Truth According to Darren Wilson. In the film, Wilson recounts his version of events, ending in him being called into a room to tell it to investigators, implying that Wilson murdered Brown, and that he later lied about the events of that day.

Brown's death is the subject of the song "What It Means" by Drive-By Truckers on their 2016 album American Band.

Iconographer Mark Dukes created the icon Our Lady of Ferguson in response to the shooting.

Poet Danez Smith published a poem entitled "not an Elegy for Mike Brown", written the night of the incident.

Seattle based rapper Macklemore mentions Wilson in the song "White Privilege II" from his second collaborative effort with producer Ryan Lewis, 2016's This Unruly Mess I've Made: "My success is the product of the same system that let off Darren Wilson – guilty"

In 2016, a chapter about Black Lives Matter memorials to Brown and others was included in the book, "The Sustainers: Being, Building and Doing Good through the Sacred Spaces of Civil Rights, Human Rights and Social Movements," by preservationist Catherine Fleming Bruce. The book won the 2017 University of Mary Washington Historic Preservation Book Prize.

English folk singer Reg Meuross included a song called "The Lonesome Death of Michael Brown" on his 2017 album Faraway People. The song's title acknowledges Bob Dylan's song against racism in the 1960s, "The Lonesome Death of Hattie Carroll", which describes the death in Baltimore of a bartender at the hands of a drunk patron, who struck her with a cane causing her to die of a brain hemorrhage.

Poet Nicole Sealey wrote The Ferguson Report: An Erasure, a book length erasure of the Ferguson Report which comments on the killing of Michael Brown and the subsequent Ferguson unrest. Her poem "Pages 22–29", an excerpt from the book, won a Forward Prize for Poetry in October 2021.

== See also ==
- List of unarmed African Americans killed by law enforcement officers in the United States
- Black Lives Matter
- List of incidents of civil unrest in the United States
- List of killings by law enforcement officers in the United States
- List of killings by law enforcement officers in the United States, August 2014
- Mothers of the Movement
