= Tom Zeller Jr. =

American journalist (born 1969)

- Born: April 30, 1969 (age 57); Cleveland, Ohio, U.S.
- Education: Cleveland State University; Columbia University
- Occupation: Journalist
- Agent(s): Mackenzie Brady Watson, Stuart Krichevsky Literary Agency, Inc.
- Notable credit(s): The New York Times; National Geographic Magazine; The Huffington Post
- Website: tomzellerjr.com

Thomas Zeller Jr. (born April 30, 1969) is an American journalist who has covered poverty, technology, energy policy and the environment, among other topics, for a variety of publications, including 12 years on staff as a writer and editor at The New York Times. He has also held staff positions at National Geographic Magazine and The Huffington Post.

In 2013–2014, he was awarded a Knight Science Journalism Fellowship at MIT.

Zeller has won several awards for visual journalism and multimedia reporting from the Society of News Design and from the University of Navarra, Spain (Malofiej Awards), including prizes for a collection of essays and graphics lending historical context to the wars in Iraq and Afghanistan; an interactive reconstruction of the shooting of Amadou Diallo; and a multimedia documentary of a Louisiana plantation, part of The Times's Pulitzer prize-winning "How Race Is Lived in America" series.

In 2016, Zeller and Pulitzer-prizewinning science writer Deborah Blum launched a new digital science publication titled Undark Magazine. He currently serves as the publication's editor in chief.

He is a co-editor and contributing author of the book A Tactical Guide to Science Journalism: Lessons From the Front Lines (Oxford University Press, 2022). His debut book is The Headache: The Science of a Most Confounding Affliction—and a Search for Relief (Mariner, 2025).

Zeller resides in Montana with his wife, Katherine Zeller.
