= Deborah Blum =

American journalist (born 1954)

Deborah L. Blum
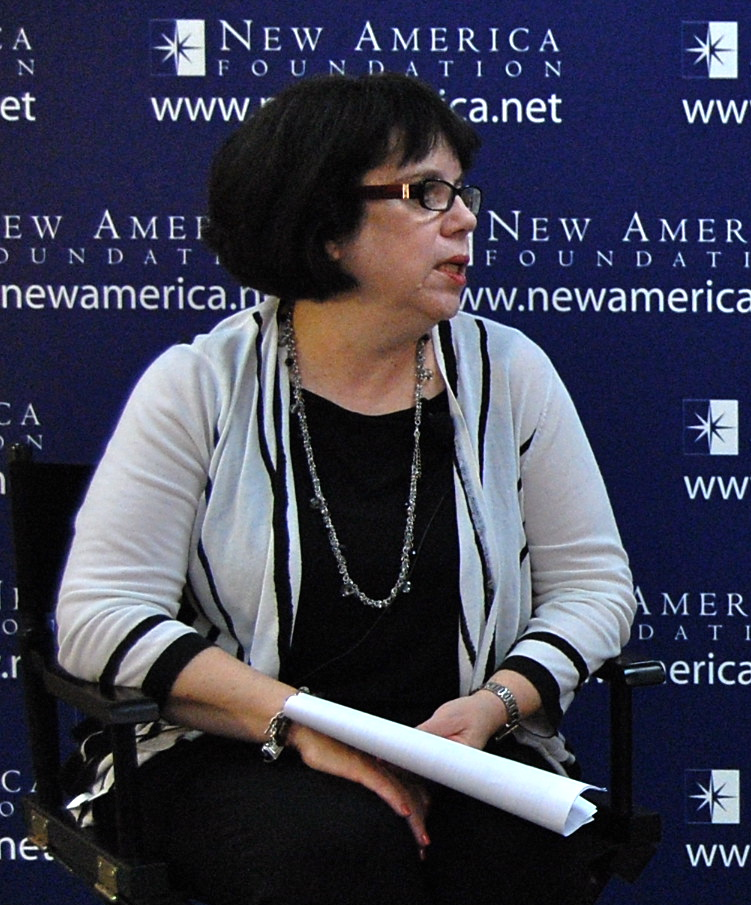
- Blum in 2012
- Born: October 19, 1954 (age 72); Urbana, Illinois, U.S.
- Education: University of Georgia (BA); University of Wisconsin-Madison (MA)
- Occupations: Professor; blogger; journalist; author; director; science writer
- Known for: The Poisoner's Handbook
- Spouse: Peter Haugen
- Children: 2
- Website: deborahblum.com

Deborah Leigh Blum (born October 19, 1954)is an American science journalist and author. She won the 1992 Pulitzer Prize for Beat Reporting for "The Monkey Wars", a series in The Sacramento Bee about the use of primates in research, which she expanded into a book of the same title. Her later books include The Poisoner's Handbook (2010) and The Poison Squad (2018), each of which was adapted as a PBS American Experience documentary.

From 2015 to 2025, Blum was director of the Knight Science Journalism Program at the Massachusetts Institute of Technology (MIT), where she co-founded the digital magazine Undark. Before that she taught journalism at the University of Wisconsin–Madison from 1997 to 2015. She was inducted into the Georgia Writers Hall of Fame in 2025.

== Early life and education ==
Blum was born in Urbana, Illinois, the daughter of the entomologist Murray S. Blum. She grew up largely in Athens, Georgia, and graduated from Clarke Central High School. She graduated from the University of Georgia's Grady College in 1976, with a double minor in anthropology and political science. After working at newspapers in Georgia and Florida, she earned a master's degree in journalism at the University of Wisconsin–Madison in 1982, with an emphasis on environmental science.

== Career ==
=== Newspapers ===
After completing her master's degree, Blum joined The Fresno Bee, and in 1984 moved to ''The Sacramento Bee'', where she became the paper's first full-time science writer and remained until 1997. Her coverage there ranged from California's nuclear-weapons laboratories and the AIDS epidemic to primate research.

A series on the weapons laboratories, "California: The Weapons Master", received the Livingston Award for National Reporting. In 1992 she won the Pulitzer Prize for Beat Reporting for "The Monkey Wars", a series examining the ethical questions raised by research on primates.

=== University of Wisconsin–Madison ===
In 1997 Blum joined the faculty of the School of Journalism and Mass Communication at the University of Wisconsin–Madison, where she taught courses in science writing and narrative writing and held the Helen Firstbrook Franklin Professorship in Journalism. The [[American Association for the Advancement of Science]] (AAAS) named her a fellow in 2009 for contributions to public understanding of science.

During this period she wrote Elemental, a blog on chemistry and poisons for Wired, which Time included in its 2013 list of the 25 best blogs.

=== Knight Science Journalism Program and Undark ===
In July 2014, MIT announced that Blum would become director of the Knight Science Journalism Program (KSJ) the following year, succeeding Philip J. Hilts. KSJ is a fellowship program for mid-career science journalists. Blum was the program's fourth director and the first woman in the role.

In 2016 Blum and Tom Zeller Jr., a former The New York Times reporter, co-founded Undark, a digital science magazine published under the auspices of KSJ, with Blum as publisher. In 2019 Undark received a George Polk Award for environmental reporting, shared with photojournalist Larry C. Price, for "Breathtaking", a series on global air pollution.

Blum announced in December 2024 that she would retire as director in the summer of 2025 after a decade in the role. MIT named Usha Lee McFarling as her successor, saying Blum was retiring to return to a full-time writing career and would join the board of ''Undark''.

== Books ==
Blum's first book, The Monkey Wars (1994), expands her Pulitzer-winning series and examines the dispute between researchers who use primates and animal-rights activists. ''Sex on the Brain'' (1997) surveys research on biological differences between men and women. Love at Goon Park (2002) is a biography of the psychologist Harry Harlow and his experiments on attachment in rhesus monkeys. It was a finalist for the Los Angeles Times Book Prize in science and technology. Ghost Hunters (2006) recounts the efforts of William James and colleagues in the American Society for Psychical Research to investigate claims of the paranormal scientifically.

The Poisoner's Handbook (2010) tells the story of New York City's first scientifically trained medical examiner, Charles Norris, and his chief toxicologist, Alexander Gettler, during the Jazz Age. It won the Society of Midland Authors Award for adult nonfiction, given in 2011 for books published the previous year. PBS broadcast a documentary based on the book, written and directed by Rob Rapley, on ''American Experience'' on January 7, 2014. In 2012 Blum published "Angel Killer", a long-form digital work for The Atavist Magazine about the child murderer Albert Fish and the insanity defense.

The Poison Squad (2018) follows the chemist Harvey Washington Wiley and the campaign for food safety that led to the Pure Food and Drug Act of 1906. It was the University of Wisconsin–Madison's 2019–20 Go Big Read selection. A PBS ''American Experience'' documentary based on it, written and directed by John Maggio, aired on January 28, 2020, with Blum appearing as a commentator.

Blum edited A Field Guide for Science Writers for the National Association of Science Writers, with Mary Knudson (1997) and with Knudson and Robin Marantz Henig (second edition, 2006), and co-edited ''A Tactical Guide to Science Journalism'' (2022) with Ashley Smart and Tom Zeller Jr.

== Professional activities ==
Blum is a past president of the National Association of Science Writers and a former board member of the World Federation of Science Journalists and the Council for the Advancement of Science Writing.

== Awards and honors ==
Year	Honor	For
1988	Livingston Award for National Reporting	"California: The Weapons Master" (series)
1992	Pulitzer Prize for Beat Reporting	"The Monkey Wars" (series)
2002	Finalist, Los Angeles Times Book Prize (Science and Technology)	Love at Goon Park
2009	Fellow, American Association for the Advancement of Science	Public understanding of science
2011	Society of Midland Authors Award, adult nonfiction	The Poisoner's Handbook
2013	Time list of 25 best blogs	Elemental (blog)
2015	Grady-Stack Award for Interpreting Chemistry for the Public, American Chemical Society	Body of work
2018	Endocrine Society Award for Excellence in Science and Medical Journalism	"The Great Soy Formula Experiment" (Undark, 2017)
2025	Georgia Writers Hall of Fame	Career achievement
