= Working Stiffs =

Working Stiffs (or Working Stiff) may refer to:

- Working stiff, an American slang term for a member of the working class
- Working Stiffs (TV series), a 1979 television series starring Jim Belushi and Michael Keaton
- "Working Stiffs" (CSI), a 2009 television episode
- Working Stiff: Two Years, 262 Bodies, and the Making of a Medical Examiner, a 2014 non-fiction book
