= Charles Hirsch =

American forensic pathologist

Chief Medical Examiner of New York City
- In office 1989 – February 6, 2013
- Mayor: Ed Koch; David Dinkins; Rudy Giuliani; Michael Bloomberg
- Preceded by: Elliot M. Gross
- Succeeded by: Barbara Sampson

Personal details
- Born: Charles Sidney Hirsch; March 30, 1937 Chicago, Illinois, U.S.
- Died: April 8, 2016 (aged 79) Westwood, New Jersey, U.S.

Charles Sidney Hirsch (March 30, 1937 – April 8, 2016) was an American forensic pathologist who served as the Chief Medical Examiner of New York City from 1989 until 2013. He oversaw the identification of victims from the World Trade Center attacks in 2001.

== Biography ==
Hirsch graduated with a B.S. degree in 1958 with high distinction from the University of Illinois, Urbana. He attended the University of Illinois College of Medicine campus in Chicago, Illinois, and received his M.D. in 1962. Hirsch was recognized with the Distinguished Alumnus Award by his medical school, delivering the commencement address at the school's 2003 graduation ceremonies.

Hirsch was a forensic pathologist in Baltimore, Maryland in 1966 and 1967. He served in Cuyahoga County, Ohio (which includes Cleveland) as deputy coroner from 1969 to 1979 and in Hamilton County, Ohio (which includes Cincinnati) from 1979 to 1985 as director of forensic pathology. He had been the Chief Medical Examiner of Suffolk County, New York, an office that performed an average of 15,000 autopsies per year since 1985. In April 1988, a special panel unanimously recommended that Hirsch be chosen to fill the vacancy in the New York City Medical Examiner's Office, to succeed Dr. Elliot M. Gross, who had been dismissed by the Mayor of New York City Ed Koch in October 1987.

== September 11, 2001, attacks on the World Trade Center ==
As head of the New York City Medical Examiners Office, Hirsch and six aides went to establish a temporary morgue for the victims of the September 11, 2001, attacks at the World Trade Center. When the North Tower collapsed, two members of the team were severely injured and Hirsch was thrown to the ground and bruised over much of his body, and left covered with dust over his entire body. Emptying the pulverized concrete from his pockets that day, Hirsch realized that many of the victims would have suffered a similar fate and been "rendered into dust". The Chief Medical Examiner's office has been responsible for the identification of the 20,000 body parts recovered at the site, and has used DNA and other medical technology to identify the individuals and to notify their families.

After the 2006 death from respiratory disease of James Zadroga, a New York City Police Department Detective who had spent 450 hours as a rescue worker at Ground Zero, the Ocean County, New Jersey medical examiner's office, conducted an autopsy in April 2006 and reported that "It is felt with a reasonable degree of medical certainty that the cause of death in this case was directly related to the 9/11 incident" making Zadroga, 34 years old at the time of his death, the first 9/11 responder whose death was directly linked with toxic Ground Zero substances. An autopsy conducted by Hirsch in October 2007 found that Zadroga's death was not related to his time at Ground Zero, with Hirsch and another medical examiner signing a statement that "It is our unequivocal opinion, with certainty beyond doubt, that the foreign material in your son’s lungs did not get there as the result of inhaling dust at the World Trade Center or elsewhere." Hirsch concluded that Zadroga died from self-injection of prescription drugs, with Hirsch finding severe scarring in his lungs that he determined was caused by cellulose and talc granulomas and stating (through a spokesperson) that "The lung disease he had was a consequence of injecting prescription drugs". Officials from the Chief Medical Examiner's office met with the Zadroga family to present his findings. A third opinion obtained by Zadroga's family later that month from Dr. Michael Baden, chief forensic pathologist of the New York State Police (and former New York City Medical Examiner), backed the original claim of WTC dust responsibility, citing the presence of glass fibers in Zadroga's lungs that could not be related to injecting drugs. The Daily News criticized Hirsch in a November 2007 editorial, stating that the results blaming the death on drug use "libeled the memory of Detective James Zadroga" and that Hirsch had "committed a gross injustice that no apology can ever set right".

As part of a March 2007 filing by families of 9/11 victims who want to conduct additional searches for remains, a letter from Hirsch signed in 2003 was included stating that cremated human remains, resulting from the initial fires when the towers were hit and the continuing flames in the pit, were included in the debris taken to the Fresh Kills Landfill, and that he believed it was "virtually certain that at least some human tissue is mixed with the dirt at the Staten Island landfill."

== Retirement and death ==
Hirsch announced his retirement on February 6, 2013, after 23 years as New York City's chief medical examiner.

Hirsch died in Westwood, New Jersey, on April 8, 2016, from unspecified complications of several illnesses.

Preceded by Elliot M. Gross	New York City Chief Medical Examiner; 1989-2013	Succeeded by Barbara Sampson
