= Gettler Boys =

The Gettler Boys were a group of toxicologists who studied under or worked with Alexander Gettler, the "father of forensic toxicology in America." They included Irving Sunshine, Arthur Tiber, Abraham Friereich and Henry Freimuth. Many Gettler Boys went on to become prominent toxicologists in their own right.

== Bibliography ==
- Blum, Deborah (2011). The Poisoner's Handbook: Murder and the Birth of Forensic Medicine in Jazz Age New York. Penguin. ISBN 9781101524893.
