= Undark Magazine =

Online magazine

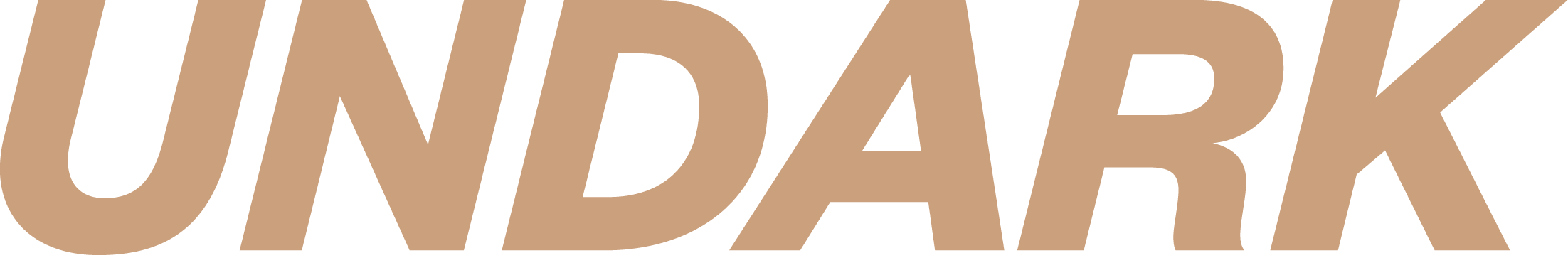
- Undark logo
- Website type: digital magazine
- Available in: English
- Founders: Deborah Blum and Tom Zeller Jr.
- Industry: Media
- Website: undark.org
- Commercial: No
- Launched: March 2016; 10 years ago

Undark Magazine is a nonprofit online publication exploring science as a "frequently wondrous, sometimes contentious, and occasionally troubling byproduct of human culture." The name Undark is a deliberate reference to a radium-based luminous paint product called Undark that ultimately proved toxic, if not deadly for those who handled it.

The publication's tag line is "Truth, Beauty, Science."

The magazine is published under the auspices of the Knight Science Journalism Fellowships program at the Massachusetts Institute of Technology.

Undark publishes a mix of long-form journalism, shorter features, essays, op-eds, questions and answers, and book excerpts and reviews. All content is freely available to read, and most is available for republishing by other publications and websites. Many large national and international publications, including Scientific American, The Atlantic, Smithsonian, NPR, and Outside have republishing relationships with Undark.

Undark was jointly founded in 2016 by Pulitzer Prize-winning science author Deborah Blum and former New York Times journalist Tom Zeller Jr., who serves as editor-in-chief of the magazine.

== Awards ==
Undark has earned numerous awards for its journalism, including being named a finalist for a 2022 National Magazine Award in the Reporting category.

On February 19, 2019, Undark was awarded a George Polk Award for Environmental Reporting. The award honored photojournalist Larry C. Price and contributing reporters for the magazine's multinational, multipart exposé on global air pollution, called "Breathtaking". The series also won the 2019 Al Neuharth Innovation in Investigative Journalism Award from the Online News Association.

The magazine's work has been anthologized in The Best American Science & Nature Writing book series.

In 2017, Undark was a finalist for an Online Journalism Award in the Feature category for its series "Wear & Tear", which explored the global impacts of the leather tanning and textile industries. In 2018, three Undark contributors were named as finalists in the National Association of Science Writers' Science and Society Awards.
