= Working Stiff: Two Years, 262 Bodies, and the Making of a Medical Examiner =

Book by Judy Melinek and T. J. Mitchell

- First edition
- Authors: Judy Melinek; T. J. Mitchell
- Language: English
- Publisher: Charles Scribner's Sons
- Publication date: 2014
- Publication place: United States
- ISBN: 978-1-4767-2725-7 (ebook) 978-1-4767-2727-1 (pbk) 978-1-4767-2727-1
- OCLC: 959727827

Working Stiff: Two Years, 262 Bodies, and the Making of a Medical Examiner is a non-fiction book written by Judy Melinek and T. J. Mitchell, a wife-and-husband writing team. In July 2001, two months before the September 11 attacks, Judy Melinek, MD, and her husband moved from Los Angeles to New York City, where she started training in forensic pathology at the Office of Chief Medical Examiner of the City of New York (headed by Charles Hirsch). The book describes some of the 262 autopsies performed by Dr. Melinek during the two years of her training. As part of a medical team she examined the remains of many of the 9/11 victims. The book was published by Charles Scribner's Sons in 2014.

== Reception ==
... Although graphic at times, the book is not a horror-fest. ... Part of what makes this book enjoyable is the wiseacre tone Melinek often affects. It’s hard to tell whether that’s her own voice or a result of the collaboration with her writer husband, T.J. Mitchell, but it works to move things briskly along. She sometimes uses her husband as a foil — his job is to be appalled at what she describes to him — and sometimes brings in her toddler son as well. ... it’s fun, sentimental where appropriate and full of smart science. Fans of CSI — the real kind — will want to read it.

The book describes autopsies in incredible detail, with each chapter dedicated to a different body, how he or she died, and how Melinek spoke to the family afterwards. The story also touches on how the autopsies shaped Melinek’s life, especially her role as a mother. In fact, the emotional elements of this book are in the foreground, while facts about human pathology and diseases seem tangential. ... Although Working Stiff is emotionally appealing and explains how it feels to be a forensic pathologist, it is superficial in explaining the scientific side of the autopsies.
