= Barbara Sampson =

Forensic pathologist

Barbara Sampson is an American forensic pathologist who was Chief Medical Examiner of New York City from 2013 to 2021. She was the first woman to lead the agency since it was created in 1918.

== Biography ==
Sampson joined the Office of the Chief Medical Examiner of the City of New York as a Fellow in Forensic Pathology in 1998. She later served as a Cardiovascular Pathology Consultant, a Senior Medical Examiner, and First Deputy Chief Medical Examiner before being appointed as the Acting Chief Medical Examiner in February 2013 when Chief Medical Examiner Charles Hirsch announced his retirement. She was formally appointed as the Chief Medical Examiner on December 10, 2014.

On November 29, 2021, it was announced that she would resign as chief medical examiner to take a post within the Mount Sinai Health System.

Preceded by Charles Hirsch	New York City Chief Medical Examiner; 2013–2021	Succeeded by Jason Graham (acting)
