= Alexander Gettler =

American forensic chemist

Alexander O. Gettler
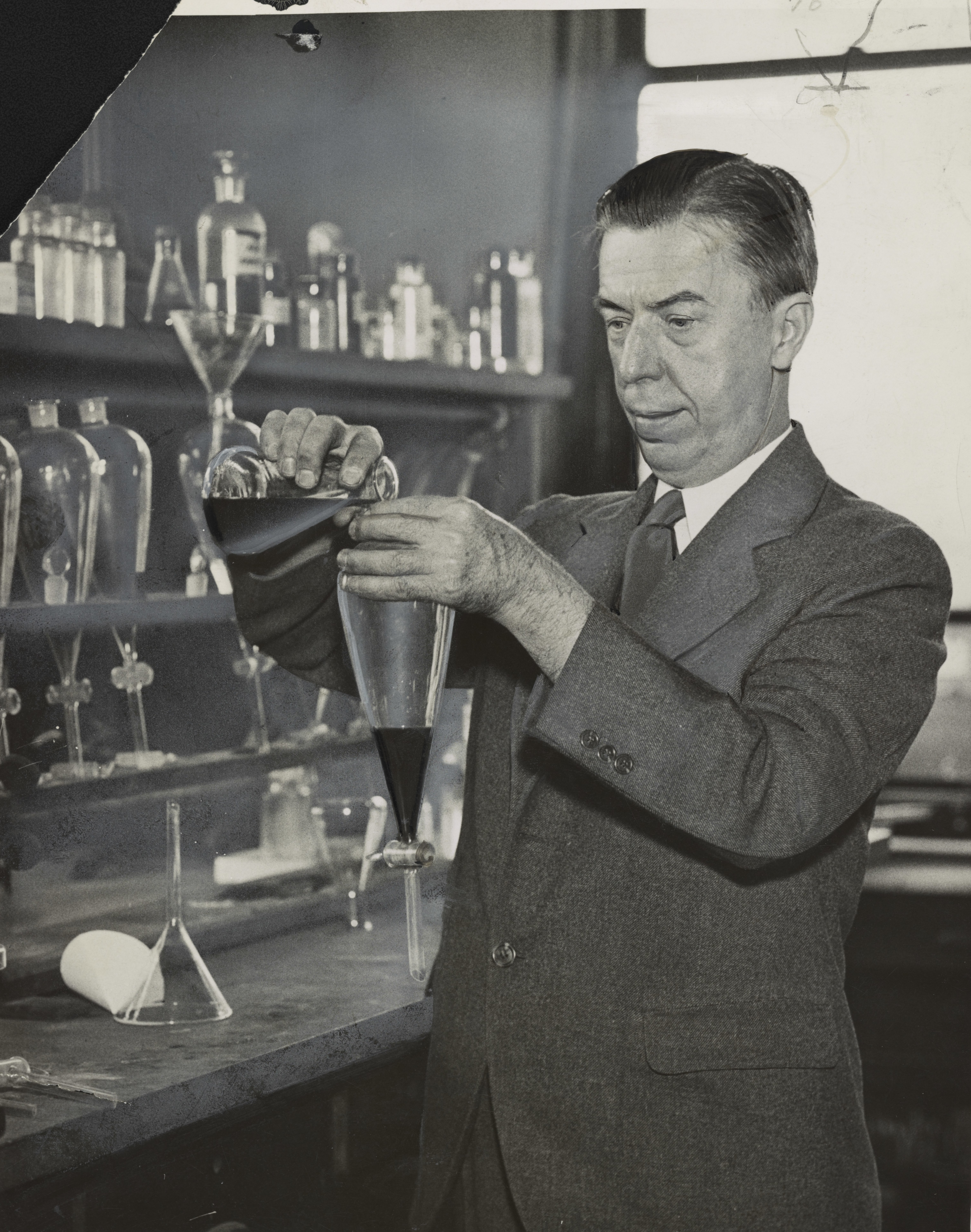
- Alexander Gettler in the toxicology laboratory located on the third floor of the City Morgue, Bellevue Hospital c.1920
- Born: August 13, 1883; Austria-Hungary
- Died: August 4, 1968 (aged 84); Yonkers, New York
- Occupation: Toxicologist
- Known for: Pioneering in the field of toxicology

Alexander Oscar Gettler (August 13, 1883 – August 4, 1968) was a toxicologist with the Office of Chief Medical Examiner of the City of New York (OCME) between 1918 and 1959, and the first forensic chemist to be employed in this capacity by a U.S. city. His work at OCME with Charles Norris, the chief medical examiner, created the foundation for modern medicolegal investigation in the U.S. and Gettler has been described by peers as "the father of forensic toxicology in America."

The Alexander O. Gettler Award is a prize established in his name by the American Academy of Forensic Sciences.

== Early life and education ==
Gettler was born Jewish in Galicia, Poland, a part of the Empire of Austria-Hungary in 1883. As Oscar Gettler, aged seven, he emigrated to the U.S. with his father, Joseph Gettler, and sister, Elise, on board the Red Star Line steamer, Westernland, which arrived at the Port of New York on May 6, 1891; they settled in Brooklyn, where he was raised. He studied at the City College of New York and in 1912 received his PhD in Biochemistry from Columbia University. Prior to his employment with OCME he worked as a clinical chemist at the Bellevue Hospital in Manhattan and taught Biochemistry at the New York University School of Medicine. He married Alice Gorman in 1912.

== Toxicology work ==
Charles Norris established the Office of the Chief Medical Examiner (OCME) in 1918 and set up his first offices in the Pathology Building (the 'City Morgue') of Bellevue Hospital. While there he asked Gettler if he would be willing to conduct any chemical testing that might be required to which Gettler agreed. An OCME laboratory, where testing was carried out for the presence of the common poisons, was set up on the third floor of the City Morgue building on First Avenue and 29th Street.

Gettler often had to create new tests to isolate poisons. He regularly experimented by poisoning raw liver and attempting to isolate ever-smaller amounts of poison from it. These tests often involved mashing or liquifying tissue, followed by such tests as crystal formation, melting and boiling point analysis, color reactions, and titration. In 1935, Gettler was the first scientist to use a spectrograph in a criminal investigation in order to prove that the thallium that had poisoned the four children of Brooklyn bookkeeper Frederick Gross did not come from cocoa powder Gross had brought home from work. A previous chemical test had mistaken copper contamination from the box for thallium leading to Gross's arrest. The examiners eventually concluded that his wife had murdered the children before dying herself of encephalitis.

In addition to this, Gettler wrote numerous papers on isolating poisons such as benzene from human bodies. In 1933, Gettler was among the first to recognize a normal endogenous presence of carbon monoxide in the human body and was the first to suggest the human gut microbiome as a contributing source.

Gettler often had to work for low pay, due to severe budget cuts to the toxicology office.

== Teaching ==
In the 1920s, Gettler took the post of professor of chemistry at Washington Square College of New York University. At the same time he held a post at the New York University Graduate School. Gettler established a toxicology course in 1935 at the City College of New York. He retired from teaching in 1948, when he reached the mandatory retirement age.

== Later life and death ==
Gettler retired from the office of the medical examiner on January 1, 1959, when he was 75. He remained interested in toxicology until he died due to a terminal illness approximately ten years after retiring.

== See also ==
- Gettler Boys
