= Judy Melinek =

American forensic pathologist and writer (born 1969)

- Born: 1969 (age 56–57); Israel
- Education: Harvard University; University of California, Los Angeles
- Employer(s): PathologyExpert Inc. & Communio LTD
- Known for: Forensic pathology

Judy Melinek (born 1969) is an American forensic pathologist and writer. She is a pathologist at the Wellington District Health Board and Chief Executive Officer of PathologyExpert Inc.

== Early life and education ==
Melinek was born in Israel. Her father, a psychiatrist, served as a medic in the Yom Kippur War. Her mother was born in a Siberian refugee camp, and was a passenger on the Haganah boat Exodus. She lost members of her family in the Holocaust. She moved to the United States at the age of five. Melinek lost her father to suicide at the age of 13. She earned her bachelor's degree in biology at Harvard University, which she graduated magna cum laude in 1991. She moved to University of California, Los Angeles, where she studied medicine and trained as a resident in pathology. She earned her Medical doctorate (MD) in 1996. She trained in both forensic pathology and neuropathology, only one of which (forensic pathology) is supported by the American Board of Pathology. She also carried out an internship in surgery at the Beth Israel Deaconess Medical Center. Melinek was working in the Medical Examiner's Office during the September 11 attacks. She examined the remains of the World Trade Center and American Airlines Flight 587 crash.

== Career ==
In 2003 Melinek was appointed to the Santa Clara County Office of the Medical Examiner. She moved to the Office of the Chief medical examiner in San Francisco in 2004. Her first book, Working Stiff, is a memoir of her medical training in New York City. It appeared on The New York Times Best Seller list. Melinek is concerned about the shortage of forensic scientists in the United States.

After the National Rifle Association of America called for doctors who want to reduce gun deaths to stay in their lane, Melinek tweeted "Do you have any idea how many bullets I pull out of corpses weekly? This isn’t just my lane. It’s my fucking highway". In an interview with The Guardian, Melinek said that she conducts one autopsy a week involving a victim of gun crime.

=== Books ===
- Melinek, Judy (2015). Working Stiff: Two Years, 262 Bodies, and the Making of a Medical Examiner. Scribner. ISBN 1476727260.
- Melinek, Judy (2019). First Cut. HQ Fiction. ISBN 1489293116.
- Melinek, Judy (2021). Aftershock. HQ Fiction. ISBN 9781867221791.

Melinek has served as a consultant for ER and MythBusters. She appeared on Science Friday where she discussed working in a city morgue. She is on the editorial board of The American Journal of Forensic Medicine and Pathology.

== Personal life ==
Melinek is married to T. J. Mitchell, an American author and scriptwriter. Together they have three children.

In 2020, Melinek and her family moved to New Zealand. As of August 2026, she is practicing forensic medicine in San Francisco, California, as the CEO of PathologyExpert Inc. She supervises five mortuaries and provides US and international forensic legal consulting.
