= Charles Norris (medical examiner) =

New York City coroner (1867–1935)

1st Chief Medical Examiner of the City of New York
- In office 1918–1935
- Preceded by: Patrick D. Riordan (acting)
- Succeeded by: Thomas A. Gonzales

Personal details
- Born: December 4, 1867 Hoboken, New Jersey
- Died: September 11, 1935 (age 67) Manhattan, New York City
- Cause of death: Heart failure
- Parent(s): Joseph Parker Norris; Frances Stevens

Charles Norris (December 4, 1867 – September 11, 1935) was New York's first appointed chief medical examiner (1918–1935) and pioneer of forensic toxicology in America.

== Early life ==
Norris was born on December 4, 1867. He was first educated at Cutler's Private School in Manhattan, later entering Yale University and earning a bachelor of philosophy with emphasis on science. He then went to the Columbia University College of Physicians and Surgeons, earning a doctorate in medicine in 1892. After studying for four years in Europe, he returned to New York, and in 1904 became the laboratory director at Bellevue and Allied Hospitals.

== Medical examiner ==
In 1917, Norris, applying for the job of Chief Medical Examiner of the City of New York, took a civil service examination and passed, along with two other doctors. Mayor John F. Hylan immediately took legal action against them, claiming that in performing autopsies as part of the examination they had violated the law. Following threats of legal action from Leonard Wallstein and other civic groups, Governor Charles Whitman intervened, forcing Hylan to appoint one of the three applicants, of which Norris was chosen to be chief medical examiner.

Norris immediately set about improving his department. After hiring several distinguished scientists and chemists, including Alexander Gettler, he was forced, due to the lack of any supplies, to buy them all out of his own money. Other problems included the possibility of his workers being drafted to serve in the army (which he solved by writing to Hylan), and the low salaries of his workers, which averaged less than $4,000 a year (approximately $86,000 today).

=== Tetraethyl lead and the "looney gas building" ===
In 1924, Norris was called in to investigate the mysterious insanity and deaths of workers in a plant that made tetraethyllead. It was mostly made in Standard Oil's plant at the Bayway Refinery in New Jersey. TEL was compounded in a small red brick building which was soon nicknamed the "looney gas building", due to the insanity of the workers there. Although Standard Oil had tried to deny that the deaths were due to tetraethyllead, New Jersey ordered the plant shut down. Although a federal investigation, by chemical industry scientists, responded to the concerns by recommending certain safety measures be adopted by production workers, it concluded that the risk posed to the public was low and the plant resumed production soon afterwards. It was not until 1978 that the leaded gasoline was banned.

=== Carbon monoxide poisoning ===
In December 1926, Francesco Travia was caught carrying parts of Anna Fredericksen's body towards the Brooklyn waterfront in New York city. Detectives found the remains of Fredericksen's dismembered body in Travia's apartment and charged him with murder. Travia claimed he and the victim had fallen asleep after drinking whiskey in his apartment, and that after waking up he found her dead on the floor. Dr. Norris concluded that the victim had died of carbon monoxide poisoning and could not have been killed by Travia. The police department ignored the conclusions of Norris and charged Travia with murder. At Travia's trial in March, 1927, the forensic analysis of Norris and chemist Alexander Gettler proved carbon monoxide gas from Travia's stove had poisoned her to death. Travia was acquitted of murder, convicted instead of illegally dismembering a dead body.

=== Advisory Board of the Association Against Impure Liquor ===
On February 12, 1927, Norris was elected to the chairmanship of the Advisory Board of the Association Against Impure Liquor. The purpose of the organization was to organize physicians, hospital administrators, and pharmacists who "realize the necessity of purity of liquors administered to the sick."

== Death ==
In the spring of 1935, Norris began to feel ill. He began staying away from public events. That summer, he took a vacation to South America, hoping to improve his health. Once he returned in late August, his health steadily deteriorated. He died at 8:30 p.m. on September 11, 1935, of heart failure.

Preceded by Patrick J. Riordan	New York City Chief Medical Examiner; 1918–1935	Succeeded by Thomas Gonzales
