= David Klinger =

David Ames Klinger (born June 8, 1958) is an American criminologist and former police officer. He is Professor of Criminology & Criminal Justice at the University of Missouri–St. Louis, as well as a senior research fellow at the Police Foundation.

== Law enforcement career ==
Before receiving his graduate degrees, Klinger worked as a police officer in both the Los Angeles (1980-1983) and Redmond, Washington (1983-1984) police departments. On July 25, 1981, four months after joining the LAPD, he shot and killed a suspect. The suspect, Edward Randolph, was in the process of attacking Klinger's partner, Dennis Azevedo, by leaping on top of him with a knife and trying to stab him in the throat.

== Academic career ==
Klinger received his B.A. from Seattle Pacific University in 1980, his M.S. from American University in 1985, and his Ph.D. in sociology from the University of Washington in 1992. His Ph.D. thesis was entitled Human ecology and law: an observational study of police behavior. He joined the faculty of the University of Houston as an assistant professor in 1992, and was promoted to associate professor there in 1998. In 1999, he joined the faculty of the University of Missouri–St. Louis as an associate professor. He is known for researching police shootings in the United States.
