= Elliot M. Gross =

American forensic pathologist

Elliot M. Gross (born c. 1933–1934) is an American forensic pathologist who served as the Chief Medical Examiner of New York City from 1979 until his dismissal in 1989.

== Background ==
Gross became chief medical examiner after replacing Michael Baden in 1979. Previously, he had been the chief medical examiner of Connecticut for nine years. He headed the New York City Chief Medical Examiners office in 1979 and performed the controversial autopsies such as Graffiti artist Michael Stewart, Eleanor Bumpurs, and Nicholas Bartlett, all killed by police officers.

Gross graduated from the Horace Mann School, Columbia College and the New York University School of Medicine. He had been the Chief Medical Examiner of Connecticut for nine years and, while a captain in the Air Force Reserve Command, served as chief of the aerospace pathology branch of the Armed Forces Institute of Pathology.

== Controversy ==
Gross and his staff were accused by several defense lawyers and forensic specialists of producing misleading or inaccurate autopsy findings in police custody cases and giving misleading testimony in trials. On January 28, 1985, Mayor Koch and Governor Cuomo ordered state and city agencies to investigate the allegations against the Medical Examiners office and Gross. In July 1985, Gross took a leave of absence following eleven charges of incompetence filed by the State Health Department. Although he was cleared of the charges filed by the State department, an administrative law judge ruled against their decision stating they lacked jurisdiction on the grounds that performing autopsies is not a practice of medicine.

There was an internal investigation of the Chief Medical Examiner's office beginning in 1986 due to an increased number of allegations of misconduct, misleading causes of deaths, and covering up evidence of police brutality. In 1986, two medical examiners were questioned following an investigation of the Chief Medical Examiner's office by the Department of Investigation about their certification of deaths on the scene. There had been no inspector general for the Medical Examiner office at the time so there was no quality control. There were 2600 cases in the backlogs of the records and toxicology units. There was hiring of new staff in evidence, communications, identification, and mortuary units and half a dozen new medical examiners. Increased inquiry allowed for major changes in mortuary to be implemented to ensure efficiency such as hospital wristbands vs. toe tags and medical examiner identifying numbers to ensure accuracy and reduce search time. The New York Times reported "the facilities were poorly maintained and disorganized and evidence in criminal cases were not handled in accordance with any identifiable system which assures quality control, accuracy, reliability, security, or availability."

In October 1987, Mayor Koch dismissed Gross, faulting his leadership and managerial ability. In 1990, after a five-year investigation, Gross was cleared of 11 charges of negligence, misconduct, and incompetence stemming from nine autopsies, including several that involved people who died in police custody. He moved on to be a pathologist with the Lake County Coroners office in Crown Point, Indiana. Later, he became medical examiner for the New Jersey counties of Cape May and Cumberland, and was an assistant medical examiner in nearby Atlantic County; he was fired from his position in Atlantic County in 2002, after a formal investigation into one of his autopsy findings concluded that he had incorrectly classified a death from natural causes as a homicide. In 2003, he was barred from performing any more autopsies in the state, but the ban was reversed the following year.

== Personal life ==
Gross has two children with his late wife Sheila Heifetz. In 1979, he married Alice Helpern.
