= Office of Chief Medical Examiner of the City of New York =

Government office

Coordinates: 40°44′29″N 73°58′30″W

Chief Medical Examiner of the City of New York
- Seal of the OCME
- Incumbent; Jason K. Graham since November 30, 2021
- Office of Chief Medical Examiner (OCME)
- Abbreviation: CME
- Appointer: Mayor of New York
- Precursor: Coroner of New York City
- Inaugural holder: Charles Norris
- Formation: 1918
- Website: Office of Chief Medical Examiner

The Office of Chief Medical Examiner of the City of New York (OCME) is a department within the city government that investigates cases of persons who die within New York City from criminal violence; by casualty or by suicide; suddenly, when in apparent good health; when unattended by a physician; in a correctional facility; or in any suspicious or unusual manner. The OCME also investigates when an application is made pursuant to law for a permit to cremate the body of a deceased person.

== History ==
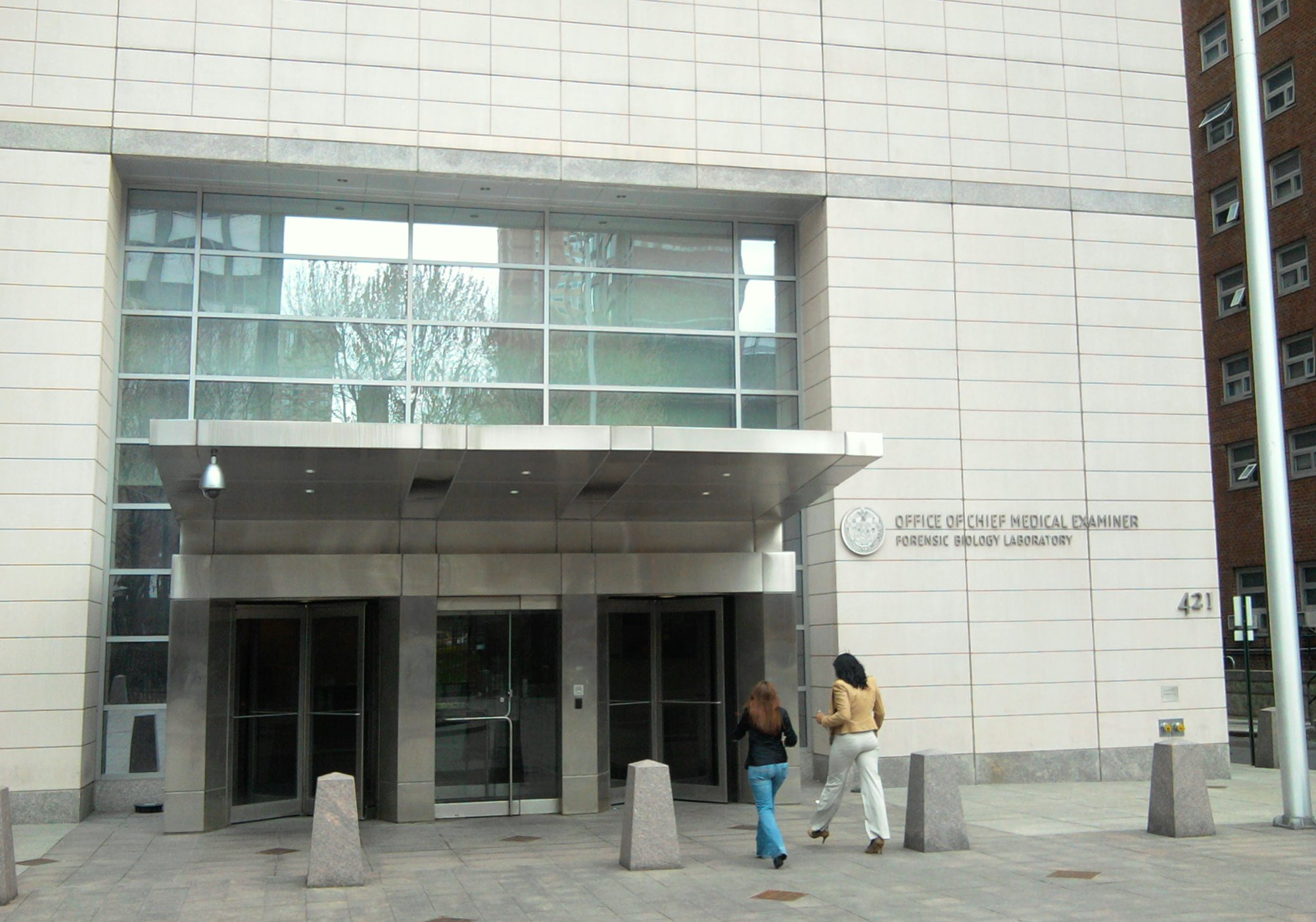
Forensic Biology Laboratory

The office was established on January 1, 1918, pursuant to a 1915 act of the New York State Legislature that abolished the office of the Coroner of New York City. The Chief Medical Examiner is appointed by the mayor. Dr. Patrick D. Riordan was the last coroner and the first acting medical examiner from January 1 to February 1, 1918, when Dr. Charles Norris was appointed by the mayor as the first official Chief Medical Examiner of New York City. The office was established at the R & S Building on the campus of Bellevue Hospital, where it remained until 1961 when it moved into a new facility at the northeast corner of First Avenue and East 30th Street.

The OCME provides the citizens of New York City essential services directly by identifying the manner and cause of death in specified cases, as well as providing state-of-the-art forensic DNA analysis through the OCME Forensic Biology Laboratory.

These services include on-site investigation into manner and cause of death; identification of remains; performing autopsies; performing DNA testing related to identification of remains; examination of homicide, sexual assault, and other crime evidence collected by the Police Department for DNA extraction and typing; and responding to disasters that involve fatalities as part of a multidisciplinary team of city agencies.

It was reported that as of May 7, 2021, there were 750 bodies "who died during the pandemic" were still inside refrigerated truck trailers at Brooklyn's 39th Street pier awaiting burial.

== List of chief medical examiners ==
No.	Name	From	To	Ref.
acting	Patrick D. Riordan as the last Coroner of New York City	January 1, 1918	February 1918	
1	Charles Norris	February 1, 1918	1935	
2	Thomas A. Gonzales	1935	1954	
3	Milton Helpern	1954	1974	
4	Dominick DiMaio	1974	1978	
5	Michael Baden	1978	1979	
6	Elliot M. Gross	1979	1987	
acting	Beverly J. Leffers	1987	1989	
8	Charles Sidney Hirsch	1989	February 6, 2013	
acting	Barbara Sampson	February 6, 2013	December 9, 2014	
9	Barbara Sampson	December 10, 2014	November 30, 2021	
acting	Jason K. Graham	November 30, 2021	April 22, 2022	
10	Jason K. Graham	April 22, 2022	incumbent	

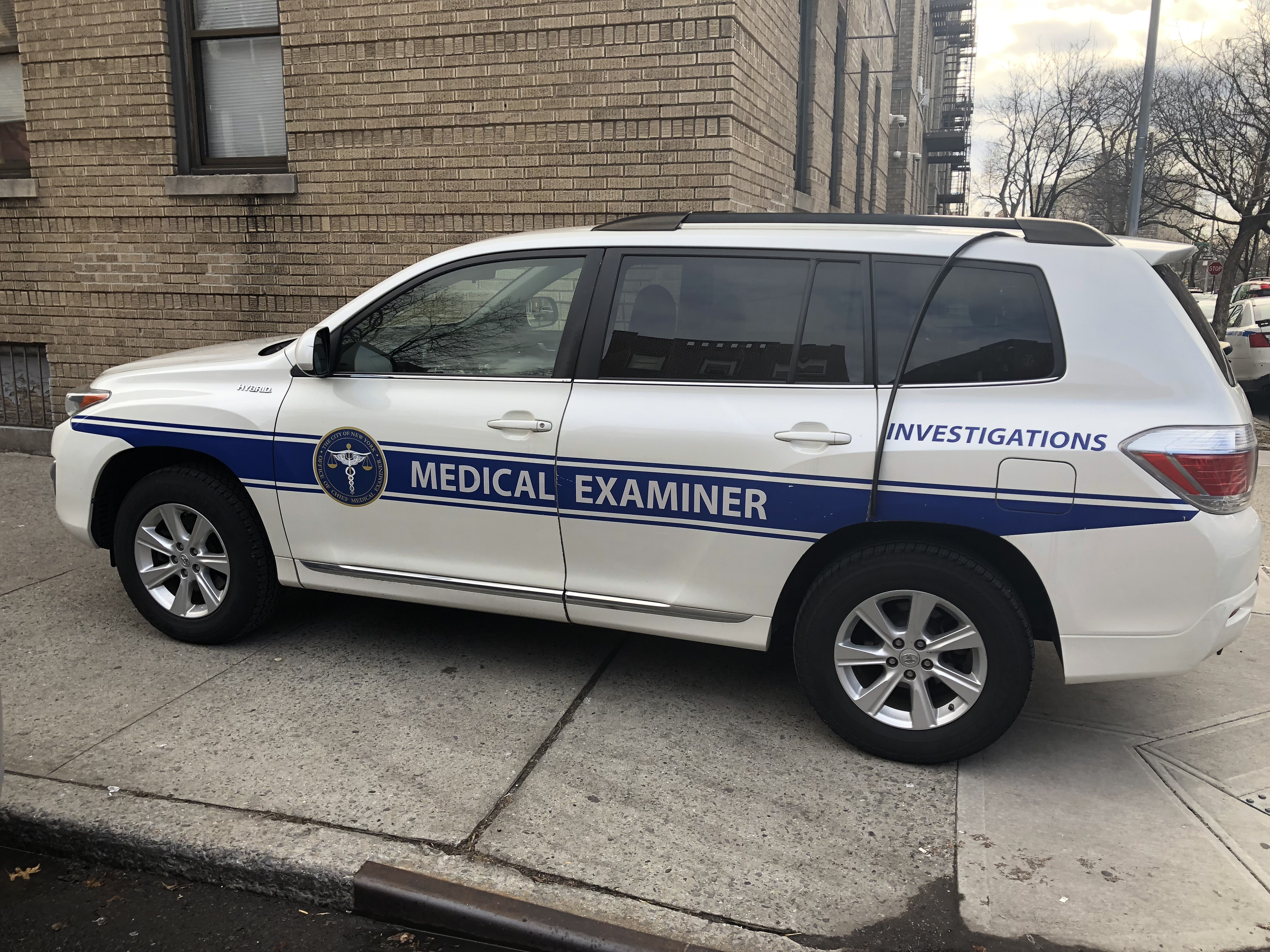
A vehicle of the Office of Chief Medical Examiner

== Unified Victim Identification System ==
In the aftermath of the numerous deaths resulting from the September 11th attacks on New York City and the crash of American Airlines Flight 587, the OCME developed the Unified Victim Identification System (UVIS). An Internet-enabled database system, it is intended to handle critical fatality management functions in the case of a major disaster with numerous deaths. It also has functionality to enable the OCME to respond to an influenza pandemic.

== See also ==
- Coroner of New York City
- Valentino Mazzia
- Working Stiff: Two Years, 262 Bodies, and the Making of a Medical Examiner
