= Tommy Hadden =

- Born: Thomas Hadden
- Occupation: Saloon keeper
- Known for: New York gang leader and underworld figure; he and Kit Burns co-led the Dead Rabbits during the 1850s.

Thomas Hadden (fl. 1840 – 1881) was an American saloon keeper, criminal and underworld figure in New York City's infamous Fourth Ward during the mid-to late 19th century. He was the owner of a Cherry Street dive bar, a popular underworld hangout located next to Dan Kerrigan's place, and co-led the Dead Rabbits with Kit Burns. For over 25 years, his Water Street boarding house was one of the most notorious "crimp houses" on the New York waterfront as thousands of sailors were shanghaied, robbed or murdered. Hadden, and contemporaries such as Bill Slocum or John Allen, exercised considerable political influence in the city and were generally able to receive protection from city officials throughout their criminal careers.

== Biography ==
=== Early life and criminal career ===
Tommy Hadden first came to prominence in New York's underworld as a Paradise Square street tough and brawler who eventually became leader of the Dead Rabbits, among other early Five Points gangs, with Kit Burns in the 1840s. As they grew older, however, they eventually moved to the Fourth Ward where they established popular dive bars and other businesses on the city's waterfront. Hadden opened a popular dive bar at No. 10½ Cherry Street, next door to a similar establishment run by pugilist Dan Kerrigan, frequented by many underworld figures throughout its existence. He also owned a sailor's home on Water Street which would eventually become known as the district's most notorious crimp house. Both he and Burns frequently returned to the Five Points to lead the Dead Rabbits on forays well into the 1850s and early 1860s.

=== Kehoe murder ===
Hadden and Burns, like many underworld figures of the period, were able to gain influence in New York City Hall and his political connections were able to protect him from his shanghaiing activities. His involvement with the Dead Rabbits, however, would occasionally result in his arrest for fighting and other violent offences. The most serious of these occurred in 1852 when Hadden committed a violent street mugging that resulted in the death of a man named Kehoe. On the night in question, Hadden and two others lured Kehoe into a dark alley off Liberty Street whereupon the gang leader approached his victim from behind and "buried a slungshot into his brain". Hadden and his accomplices stole the gold that Kehoe was carrying and escaped. Kehoe was eventually found, still alive, and carried to a nearby friend's house on Fourth Avenue where he died of his injuries a few hours later.

Hadden was brought to trial, and although two of his henchmen were convicted, Hadden himself won acquittal despite being subject to the same evidence. He often was able to avoid conviction in Police Courts and only once appeared before General Sessions. At this particular trial, he was sentenced to a long term in the state prison but never served his sentence and a few days after the trial "was again in his old den plying his nefarious vocation". In his criminal career, he served only two short terms in the New York State Prison.

=== Involvement in the Water Street Revival ===
Hadden was one of several underworld figures involved in the so-called "Water Street Revival" when John Allen, a saloon-keeper known as the "Wickedest Man in New York", became the subject of a public crusade headed by lawyer and journalist Oliver Dyer. After the close of Allen's saloon in 1868, it was claimed by A.C. Arnold and other ministers that Hadden and others had "reformed" their criminal ways and had turned over there establishments so that religious sermons could be held. On September 11, 1868, Hadden consented to a prayer meeting to be held in his Water Street boarding house. No such services were held in his more infamous Cherry Street resort. Neither did he or his fellow saloon keepers attend services at the Howard Mission though they did allowed themselves to be mentioned in the congregation's prayers. It was eventually revealed in an exposé by The New York Times that Hadden and others had accepted money from religious leaders to rent their establishments to them. The newspaper specifically charged Hadden with "playing the pious with the hope of being secured from trial before the Court of General Sessions for having recently shanghaied a Brooklynite, and also in consideration of a handsome moneyed arrangement with his employers".

=== Imprisonment and later years ===
In June 1870, Hadden was arrested for grand larceny in New Jersey and sentenced to 10 years' imprisonment in New Jersey State Prison. His conviction was celebrated in both New Jersey and New York. The New York Times was especially critical of the city officials who had seemingly ignored his long criminal history. After his release, he returned to the New York waterfront to work as a bootblack or "wharf-rat". In 1881, according to union leader Michael Lee, Hadden was working on the steamship City of Alexandria.
