= George Leese =

American pirate

George "Snatchem" Leese
- Occupations: Criminal, Pirate
- Known for: River pirate and member of the Slaughter House Gang; popular character in illegal bare-knuckle fighting at Kit Burns' Sportsman's Hall.

George "Snatchem" Leese (fl. 1840–1850) was an American criminal, pirate, and a leader of the Slaughter House Gang, known for pickpocketing and river pirating and also for being a prominent personality at illegal bare-knuckle prize fighting held in New York City's infamous Forth Ward and Five Points dive bars during the 1840s and 50s, most notably at Kit Burns' Sportsman's Hall. He was the bouncer and often appointed the official "bloodsucker" in prize fights which called for him to suck the blood from wounds suffered by competitors so the bout could continue for as long as possible. This office made Leese an important figure at these fights.

Leese considered himself as a person who never had an equal in America. He was well known by the New York Police for several years, and was proud of the level of notoriety he had achieved. Leese had also been a gambler in Ann Street and Broadway, and was successful at it according to his own account. He had also claimed that he was capable of "preaching the bloody gospil against any minister in New York", and that he knew all the hymns written by Isaac Watts.

Leese was also employed by John Allen at his Water Street dance hall. He was often armed with two revolvers in his belt and a knife worn on his boot top, and "a bludgeon in his huge fist". Leese described himself as a "rough-and-tumble-stand-up-to-be-knocked-down-son-of-a-gun" and a "kicking-in-the-head-knife-in-a-dark-room fellow" although he was described in less flattering terms by a contemporary journalist as "a beastly, obscene ruffian, with bulging, bulbous, watery blue eyes, bloated face and a coarse swaggering gait".
