= Gawai Dayak =

Public holiday in Sarawak, Malaysia (1–2 June)

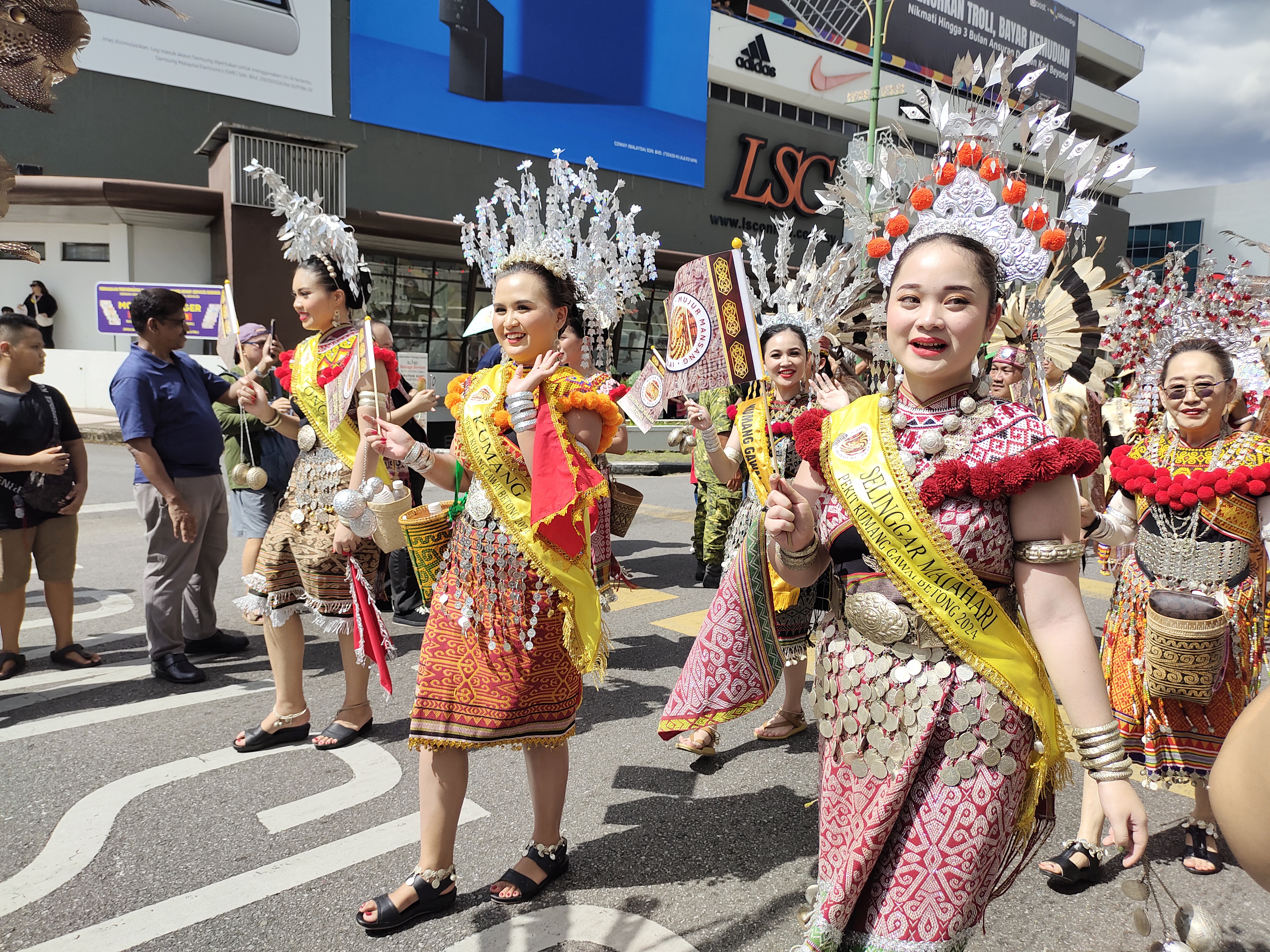
- 2024 Gawai Dayak parade in Kuching, Sarawak
- Official name: Gawai Dayak
- Also called: Ari Gawai (Iban), Andu Gawai (Bidayuh), Hari Gawai Dayak (Malay)
- Observed by: Dayaks: Iban, Bidayuh, Kayan, Kenyah, Kelabit, Orang Ulus
- Type: Ethnic, cultural
- Significance: To mark the end of the rice harvesting season and gratitude for all the blessings, harmony, sustenance and luck the Dayak tribe has received
- Celebrations: Family and other social gatherings, symbolic decoration
- Observances: Beauty pageants of Pekit Kumang (Dayak/Iban female), Dayung Sangon (Bidayuh female), Keligit (Orang Ulu female) and Miss Cultural Harvest Festival (female), Pekit Keling (Dayak/Iban male), Dari Pogan (Bidayuh male), dance performance of Ngajat, Pencha (sword dance), Kuntau (martial arts), and other arts and crafts performances
- Begins: 1 June
- Ends: 2 June
- Date: June 1
- Duration: 2 days
- Frequency: Annual
- First time: 1965 in Sarawak, Malaysia
- Related to: Kaamatan

Gawai Dayak (Iban: Ari Gawai; Bidayuh: Andu Gawai; Malay: Hari Gawai Dayak) is a form of harvest festival celebrated on 1 and 2 June annually in the state of Sarawak in Malaysia.

It is observed annually on the month of June by the Dayak ethnic groups to mark the end of the rice harvesting season and gratitude for all the blessings, harmony, sustenance and luck the tribe has received. The festival is also celebrated by Dayaks in neighbouring West Kalimantan, Indonesia on the other date, although it is still not recognised a public holiday by the republic, as well as other Dayak (particularly Iban and Bidayuh) diaspora all around Malaysia, Indonesia and abroad.

The festival is celebrated with various symbolic decoration and family and other social gatherings activities such as beauty pageants of Pekit Kumang (Dayak/Iban female), Dayung Sangon (Bidayuh female), Keligit (Orang Ulu female) and Miss Cultural Harvest Festival (female), Pekit Keling (Dayak/Iban male), Dari Pogan (Bidayuh male), dance performance of Ngajat, Pencha (sword dance), Kuntau (martial arts), and other arts and crafts performances together with the availability of food stalls throughout the festivals.

== Etymology ==
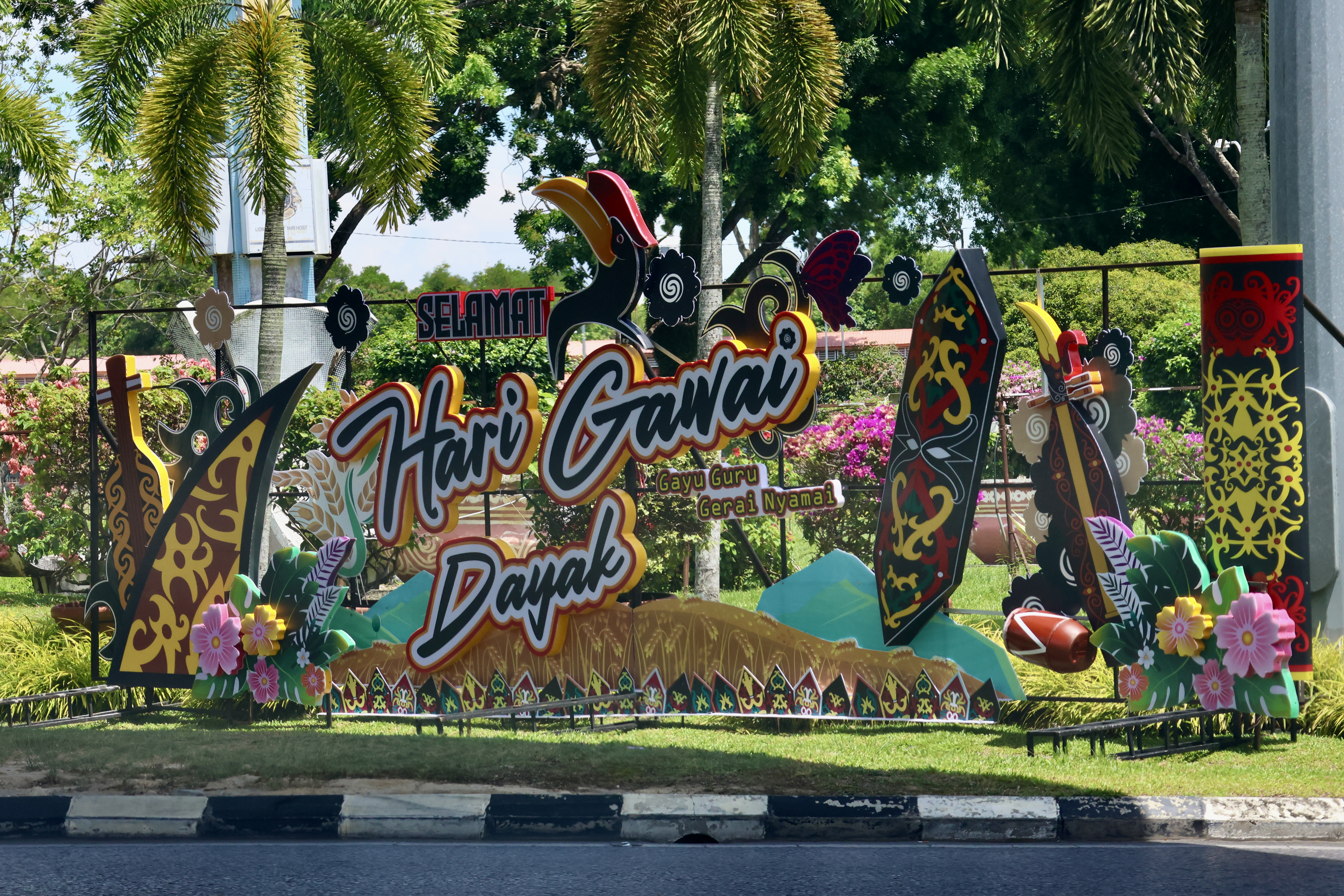
An example of either a signboard, banner or roadside billboard throughout the month of the Gawai Dayak harvest festival taken in Miri, Sarawak on 25 May 2024

The Gawai Dayak term comes from Gawai meaning "festival" or "ritual" and Dayak a collective name for the indigenous peoples of Sarawak, Indonesian Kalimantan and the interior of Borneo. (Note: The Dayaks, previously known as the Sea Dayak are mostly Iban people. Other ethnic groups such as the Bidayuh people (Land Dayak) and Orang Ulu are recognised. The Orang Ulu include the Kayans, Kenyahs and Lun Bawangs. There are over 200 riverine and hill-dwelling ethnic subgroups in the region. Although these peoples have common traits, each have their own dialect, customs, laws, territory and culture. Dayak languages are categorised as part of the Austronesian languages. The Dayaks embraced animism and paganism but in recent times, many have converted to Christianity.) In the Iban language, the festival is called Ari Gawai, while the Bidayuh refers to it as Andu Gawai. During the Gawai Dayak, roadside billboard or banner greetings such as Selamat Hari Gawai Dayak "Gayu Guru Gerai Nyamai, Lantang Senang Nguan Menoa" which is translated to "Wishing you longevity, wellness, and prosperity", is commonly found around Sarawak during the festive season.

== History ==
During the Brooke era, the celebration of Dayak festivities was only celebrated according to the traditions of each of the Dayak sub-groups since it was not officially recognised as a national public holiday by the Brooke kingdom like Christmas, Eid al-Fitr (Hari Raya Aidilfitri), and Chinese New Year holidays. This was continued until the administration by the then British Crown colony government of Sarawak which considered the day as both "Dayak Day" and "Sarawak Day" for the inclusion of all Sarawakians as a national day, regardless of ethnic origin, where it became both a religious and a social occasion since the 1950s despite still being without any official recognition as a public holiday. There is a strong perception among the British colonial authorities at the time that the strong agitation for a "Dayak Day" will draw the Dayaks to communism by the infiltration of the leftists among them. Despite this, a gathering organised among the Dayaks for the colonial government to recognise the Dayak Day didn't start any communist meetings; instead, it led to more pressure on the government to recognise the ethnic celebration day.

First mooted by radio producers Tan Kingsley and Owen Liang, the British colonial government then began to consider recognising it by 1962. Michael Buma, a Dayak native in Betong, hosted the first unofficial celebrations of Gawai Dayak at his residence in Siol Kandis on 1 June 1963. The issue of the name of Dayak festivities continued until after the formation of the Malaysian federation, until it was brought to the State Council (Council Negri) several times, and in April 1964, it was officially recognised. Initially, the Gawai celebration was to be called the "Dayak National Day", but the naming proposal was objected to by some government officials who feared that Dayak nationalism (especially chauvinism) would become the obstacle in the cultural celebration. In the State Council, a Sarawakian female Dayak politician, Tra Zehnder, who is also the first woman to occupy a seat in the Sarawak State Legislative Assembly strongly fought for the festivity recognition together with Barbara Mendu Bay, but it was not officially recognised as a public holiday until Stephen Kalong Ningkan of the Sarawak National Party (SNAP) became the first Chief Minister of Sarawak where the public holiday is officially named Gawai Dayak Day instead. On 25 September 1964, the celebration was officially gazetted as a public holiday, and the first official celebration was held on 1 June 1965 and became a symbol of unity, aspiration and hope for the Dayak community since then, which is an integral part of Dayak social life.

== Celebration activities ==
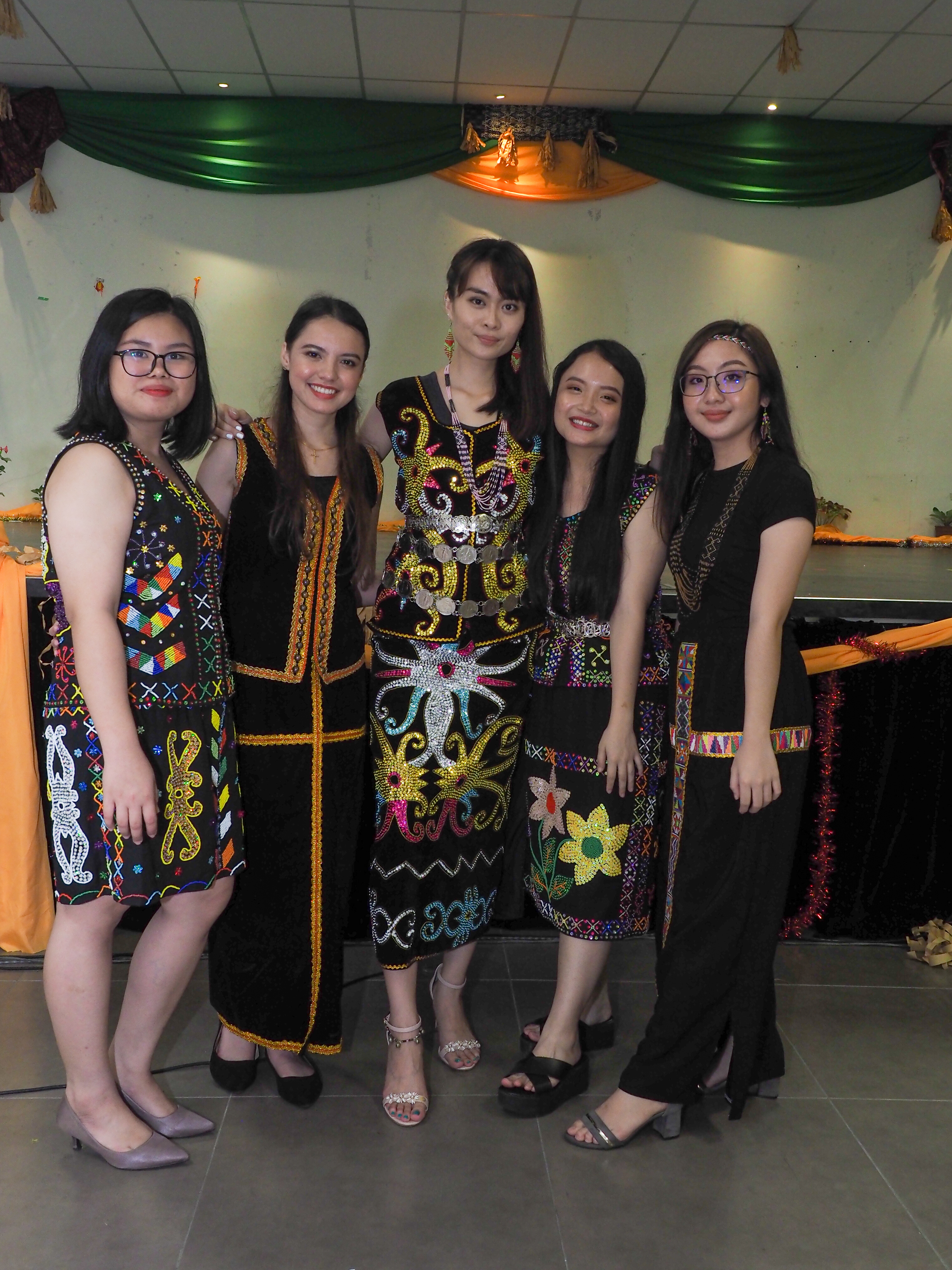
A joint Gawai-Kaamatan celebration at St. Ignatius Catholic Church, Petaling Jaya in West Malaysia by both Sarawak and Sabah indigenous communities. From left: Orang Ulu, Kadazan, Kenyah, Murut and Rungus females

Gawai Dayak is celebrated by ethnic Dayaks, as well its sub-group in the state such as Iban, Bidayuh, Kayan, Kenyah, Kelabit, and Orang Ulus, and the celebration lasts for the whole of the month of June. As the festival day approaches, everyone will be busy with general tidying up, grave visiting, paddy drying and milling, collecting and preparing food and final house decoration, where necessary. The mode of celebrations of Gawai Dayak vary from place to place and preparations begin early with the three major Dayak communities of Ibans, the Bidayuhs and the Orang Ulus celebrates the occasion in their own distinctive way. Throughout the festive, activities such as hosting prefestival thanksgiving dinners and open house gatherings, cultural shows, female beauty pageants of Pekit Kumang (Dayak/Iban female), Dayung Sangon (Bidayuh female), Keligit (Orang Ulu female) and Miss Cultural Harvest Festival (female), male beauty pageants of Pekit Keling (Dayak/Iban male), Dari Pogan (Bidayuh male), as well as the setting up of food bazaars are held.

=== Food and drink ===
On Gawai Eve, sago and heart of palm (upa aping) will be gathered for the preparation of soups and stews, this also includes vegetables such as bamboo shoots, Dayak round brinjals, wild midin fern, fiddlehead fern, and tapioca leaves either from the nearest jungle, farms or gardens. For the Dayak tribes that live in interior parts, they may organise a hunting, trapping, fishing and more for meat, fish and vegetables that'll be served for the festival. After the gathering of plants and vegetables early in the morning, the poultry is slaughtered. Both the meat and fish can be preserved with salt in a jar, or smoked over a firewood platform above the hearth. Enough meat is cooked in mid-aged thin-walled bamboo logs to make a traditional dish called pansoh or lulun in Iban language. The meat is first mixed with traditional herbs like lemongrass, ginger, bungkang leaves and salt.

Among the dishes that hold a special place in the festivity, especially among the Iban and Bidayuh, is ayam pansuh (manok pansoh), a traditional chicken dish cooked in a bamboo stalk with onions, ginger, lemongrass, garlic, torched ginger flower, and galangal and roasted in an open fire, which infuses the chicken with a distinctive flavour and aromatic smells. Any remaining meat is preserved in salt and mixed with kepayang leaves and detoxified seeds. Wooden cooking implements are made from small tree logs. Pig heads are roasted on an open fire to be served hot with the traditional Dayak liquor, a rice wine called tuak, brewed at least one month before the Gawai Dayak. The drink is brewed from the glutinous rice from a recent harvest mixed with homemade yeast called ciping. Traditionally, tuak was made with rice milk only, but is now cut with sugar and water in a process called manduk. A stronger alcoholic beverage made by the Iban is langkau (also called arak tonok, "burnt spirit" by the Bidayuh). This drink is made by distilling tuak over a fire.

Some glutinous rice is cooked in bamboo nodes to soak up the bamboo aroma, such as pangkang (also called pogang). Normal rice will be cooked in pots at the kitchen hearth. The addition of pandan leaves also gives a special aroma together with smoke from the fire wood which gives a distinctive aroma. Some Dayaks, especially Orang Ulu, will wrap rice in long green leaves (daun long) before steaming it inside a pot. When a longhouse agrees to host Gawai Dayak with big ritual festivals, they may need to plant extra paddy and organise labour exchange (bedurok). Rice may be purchased from towns if the festival is in a place where paddy farming is absent or insufficient. Traditional kuih delicacies are prepared from glutinous rice flour mixed with sugar. These kuih includes sarang semut (ant nest kuih), cuwan (molded kuih), and kuih kapit/sapit (twisted/folded kuih). The kuih can last well whilst kept inside a jar because they are deep-fried until hardened. Penganan iri (a discus-shaped kuih) are made just before the festival day and the making process are more easily than the former despite the kuih did not lasts longer since it is lifted from the hot frying oil while not fully hardened. The sugar used in the kuih making can either be the brown nipah (nypa fruticans) palm sugar or cane sugar.

=== Decoration of the longhouse ===
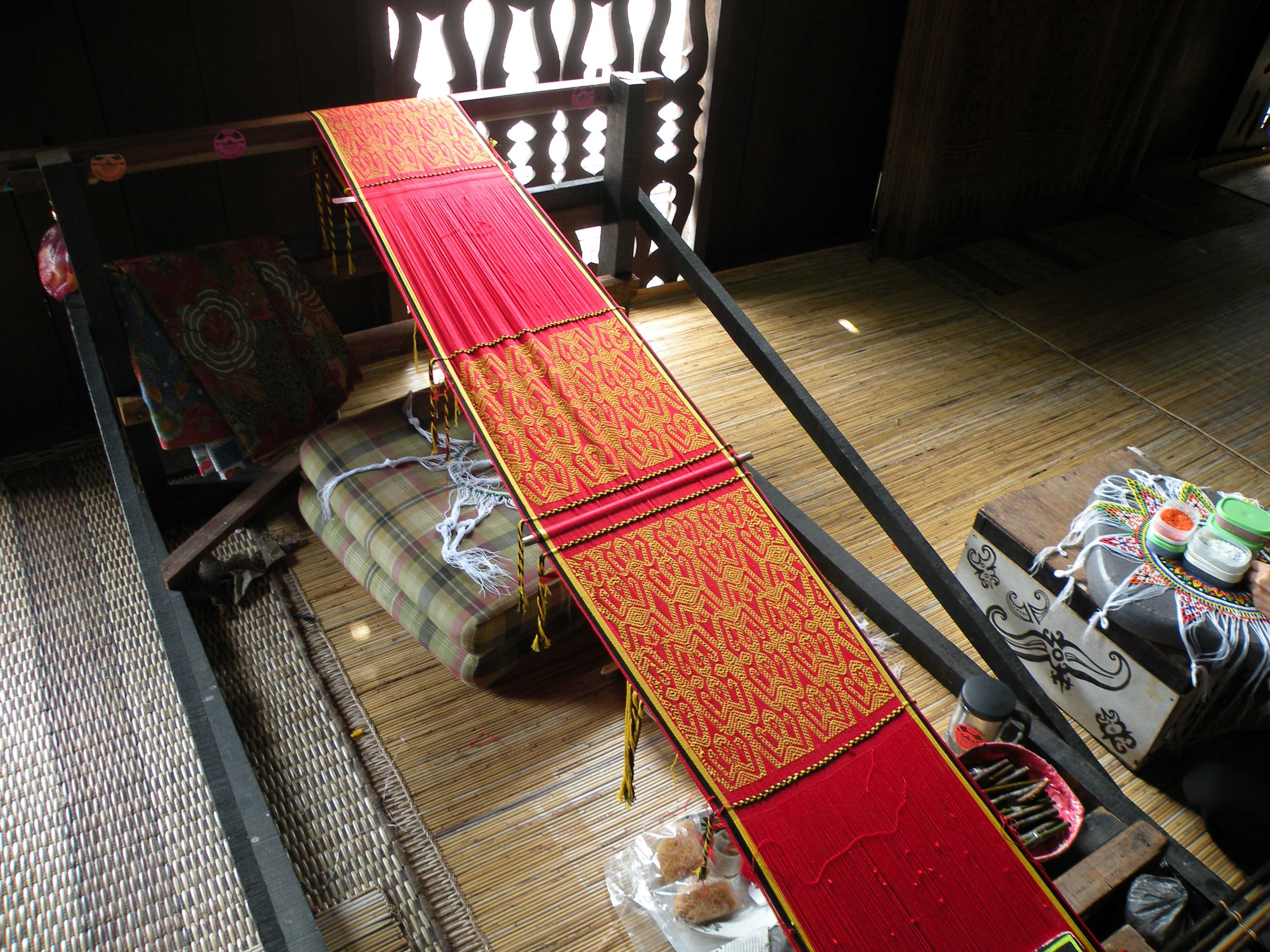
Pua Kumbu, a traditional Dayak Iban's handwoven crafts commonly found in Sarawak longhouses

The longhouse is cleaned, repaired and repainted by cooperation amongst its residents. The longhouse is constructed as a unique place of living and worship. Its main post (tiang pemun) is the designated starting point of all the building materials (pun ramu) and must remain intact. Timber and wooden materials for repairs are obtained from nearby reserve forests (pulau galau or pulau ban) or purchased in towns. (Note: The indigenous "Pulau" is an area of primary forest usually belongs to the indigenous longhouses community in the inner Sarawak and the community that owned it is entitled to the land. The people coming from other longhouses may hunt, collect food and wild vegetables including cutting bamboo, cane and creeper but cannot extract timber or climb fruit trees where exclusive rights for the resources rest with the longhouse community that owns it.) A pantar (long chair) may be built along the upper area of the ruai (gallery). The seat is raised and the tanju (verandah wall) is used as the backrest. Some old wooden longhouses (rumah kayu) are renovated with concrete and bricks to make a terraced structure (rumah batu).

The inside walls of the longhouse are decorated with ukir murals portraying tree and wild animal motifs. Men with decorating skills make split bamboo designs. Women decorate living room walls by hanging their handwoven ceremonial clothes called Pua Kumbu and other handicrafts. The Orang Ulu are famous for their colourful paintings of the tree of life on their house walls and their house posts are elaborately carved. Highly decorated shields are displayed near the family room door. Heirloom jars, brassware, and old human skulls obtained during historical raids or trade sojourns, if still kept, are cleaned and displayed. Deer horns may be secured to the longhouse posts to hold highly decorated swords and other household items.

Highly decorated mats for guests to sit on are laid out on the longhouse gallery which runs the entire length of the longhouse. The act is called beranchau ("mat spreading and adjoining") which marks the opening of the Gawai. The Dayaks make various types of traditional hand-woven mats. There are reed mats woven with colourful designs, lampit rattan mats, bidai tree bark mats and permaidani mats. The walls of most family rooms and galleries are decorated with traditional blankets such as the woven Pua Kumbu and the tied cloth (kain kebat) blankets which are made with unique Dayak designs. During the festival, women are keen to display the products of their skills and hard work at mat-making and hand-weaving. Some traditional baskets are also seen. Some sets of traditional musical instruments are also displayed in the gallery.

=== Traditional dress ===
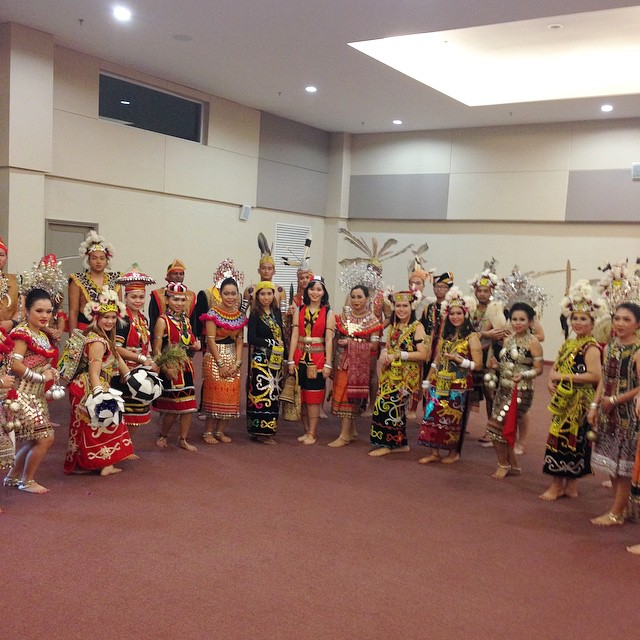
The indigenous groups in Sarawak, both male and female, in their respective traditional dress during the Gawai festive

Men and women may wear ngepan, the traditional costume, especially when guests are arriving. The traditional dress of men is a loincloth (sirat or cawat), animal skin coat (gagong), peacock and hornbill feathers (lelanjang) headwear, chains over the neck (marik), silver armlets and anklets along with a shield, sword, and spear. Historically, Dayak men are decorated with tribal tattoos (kalingai or pantang in Iban) which signify their life experience and journey. A frog design on the front of the man's neck and/or tegulun designs on the backs of the hand indicate the wearer has chopped off a human head or killed a man in military combat. Most of the designs are based on headhunting and other spiritual significance.

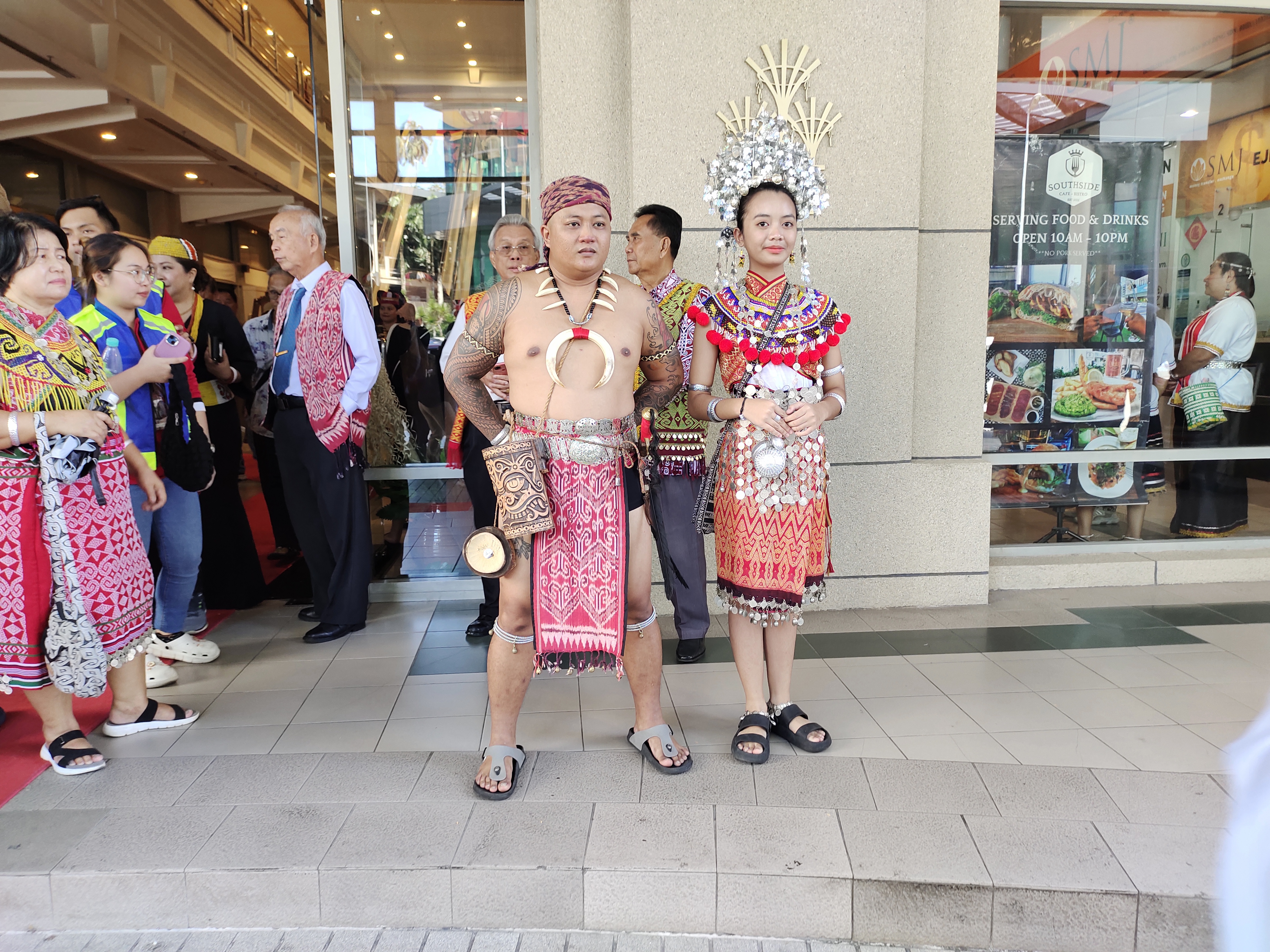
Dayak traditional dress during Gawai, the women with kain betating and neck and shoulders woven beaded chain of marik empang

Women wear a handwoven cloth (kain betating) worn around the waist, a woven beaded chain over the neck and shoulders (marik empang), a rattan and brass ring high corset around the upper body, selampai (a long piece of scalp) worn over the shoulders, a decorated high-comb (sugu tinggi) over the hair lump (sanggul), a silver belt (lampit), anklet, armlet, as well as an orb fruit purse. In the past, it was customary for Dayak women to bare their breasts as a sign of beauty. Among the Orang Ulu Dayaks, stretched earlobes is also a standard of beauty, despite not widely practised among the newer generations due to the more popularly Westernised interpretation of beauty.

=== Offerings and sacrifices ===
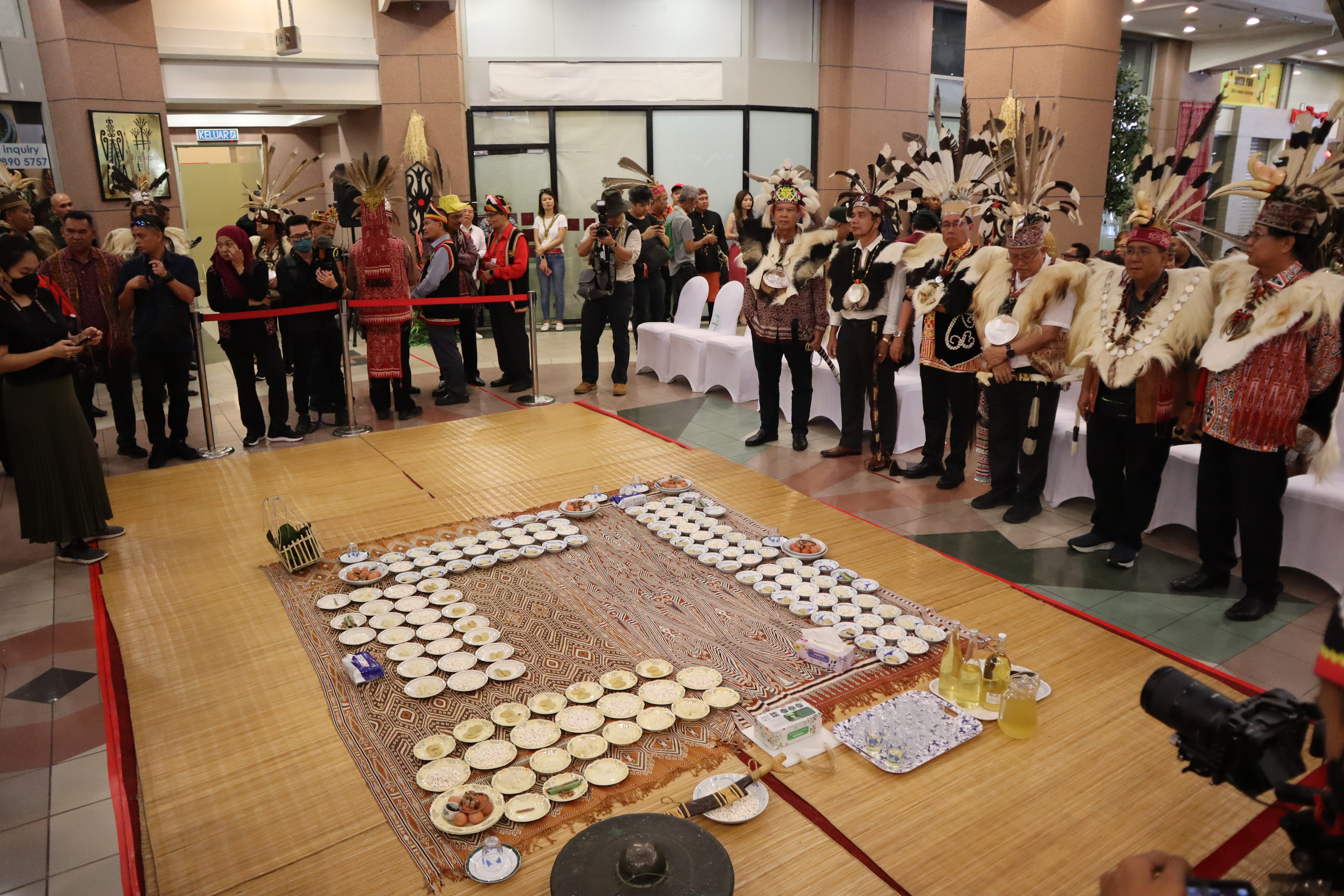
An example of an offering to the Dayaks' God of Bunsu (Kree) Petara through a ritual called miring ceremony

Celebrations begin on the evening of 31 May with a ceremony to cast away the spirit of greed (Muai Antu Rua). Two children or men, each dragging a winnowing basket (chapan), will pass each by family's room. Every family will throw some unwanted article into the basket. The unwanted articles will then be tossed to the ground from the end of the longhouse. At dusk, a ritual offering ceremony (miring or bedara) will take place at every family room, one after the other. Before the ceremony, ritual music called gendang rayah is performed. Old ceramic plates, tabak (big brass chalices), or containers made of split bamboo skins (kelingkang) are filled with food and drinks to be offered to the deities.

The Iban Dayaks believe in seven deities (the people of hornbill's nest, Orang Tansang Kenyalang) whose names are Sengalang Burong (the war god represented by the brahminy kite), Biku Bunsu Petara (the great priest, who is second in command), Menjaya Manang (the first shaman and god of medicine), Sempulang Gana with Semerugah (the god of agriculture and land), Selampandai (the god of creation and procreativity), Ini Inee/Andan (the god of justice) and Anda Mara (the god of fortune). Iban Dayaks also call upon the legendary and mythical people of Panggau Libau and Gelong, and other good, helpful spirits or ghosts to attend the feast. The entire pantheon of gods is cordially invited to the Gawai feast. Offerings to the deities are placed at strategic spots: the four corners of each family room for protection of souls; in the kitchen; at the rice jar; in the gallery; the tanju; and the farm. Other highly prized possessions such as precious old jars and modern items like rice milling engines, boat engines, or a car may also be placed with offerings. Any pengaroh (charm) will be brought out for this ceremony to ensure its continuous effectiveness and to avoid madness afflicting the owner. Wallets are placed among the offerings to increase the tuah or fortune of the owners.

Each set of offerings usually contains specified odd numbers (1, 3, 5, 7) of traditional items: the cigarette nipah leaves and tobacco, betel nut and sireh leaves, glutinous rice in a hand-woven leave container (senupat), rice cakes (tumpi), sungki (glutinous rice cooked in buwan leaves), glutinous rice cooked in bamboo logs (asi pulut lulun), penganan iri (cakes of glutinous rice flour mixed with nipah sugar), ant nest cakes and moulded cakes, poprice (made from glutinous paddy grains heated in a wok or pot), hard-boiled chicken eggs and tuak rice wine poured over or contained in a small bamboo cup. After all the offering sets are completed, the chief of the festival thanks the gods for a good harvest, and asks for guidance, blessings and long life as he waves a cockerel over the offerings (bebiau). The cockerel is sacrificed by slicing its neck. Its wing feathers are pulled out and brushed onto its bleeding neck after which each feather is placed as a sacrifice (genselan) onto each of the offering sets. The offerings are then placed at the designated locations.

=== Dinner ===
Once the offering ceremony is completed, the family sits down for dinner, the makai di ruai (meal at gallery) or makai rami (festival meal) in the gallery of the longhouse. Each family member has contributed something. All the best traditional foods, delicacies and drinks that have been prepared are displayed. Just before midnight, a spirit-welcoming procession (Ngalu Petara) is performed several times up and down the gallery. The chief and elders hold a begeliga to remind everybody to keep order, peace and harmony. Heavy fines (ukom) are imposed on those who break the customary adat and festive ground rules with fighting, quarrelling, drunkenness or vandalism. At midnight, a gong is rung to call the inhabitants to attention. The longhouse chief (tuai rumah) or host will lead a toast to longevity (Ai Pengayu) and the new year with a short prayer (sampi). Mistakes are forgiven and disputes are resolved. Where a bard is available, the person may be asked to recite a short chant called timang ai pengayu ("Chanting the water of longevity") to bless the longevity water before the chief says the short prayer.

=== After dinner ===
After dinner, celebrations are less formal. A tree of life (ranyai) is erected in the centre of the gallery to symbolise the ritual shrine with valuable fruits. Around it, performances of the ngajat dance, sword dance (bepencha) or self-defence martial art (bekuntau) are performed after some symbolic traditional activities. The first order among the activities after dinner is the badigir, a lining up of elders and/or guests if any according to their social rank. A tabak (chalice) of food and drinks is offered to each elder in the line up by a few women of high social rank in the longhouse, normally a wife offering to her husband. A group of women in costumes led by an expert sings a pantun (praise song) befitting the status of each elder while offering a jalong (bowl) of tuak and some tabas (delicacies) to several key elders with some outstanding life achievement.

The chief among them will then be requested to symbolically split open a coconut which symbolises the skull trophies traditionally treasured by the Iban Dayak because the skull is believed to present various types of valuable seeds for men, be they for farming or procreation purposes. In more elaborate events, the chief warrior will perform the symbolic act of clearing the pathway (ngerandang jalai). He is then followed by his warriors in performing the symbolic act of hand-railing the pathway (ngelalau jalai). Next, follows a procession by men and women, ladies, youths and kids in traditional costumes along the gallery in honour of the elders in the line up, normally three rounds depending on the length of the longhouse. One outcome of this procession is the anointing of a kumang (princess) and a keeling (prince). After this, some of the procession participants may go for the tuak contained in several medium-sized jar (kebok or pasu) after paying a token of their appreciation to the respective owners who are normally expert brewers. This tuak is normally the pure liquid from the glutinous rice which tastes sweet but it contains a high concentration of alcohol.

Another important activity is the singing of traditional poems. These include pantun, ramban, jawang, sanggai and pelandai. Any honoured guests to longhouses may be asked to break open a coconut to symbolise the actions of Sengalang Burong (the god of war) which also means victory for the well-being and protection of the communities. In the actual cleansing of the freshly taken heads, the troop leader would eat a bit of the brain with a piece of a glutinous rice before proceeding to throw away the rest of the brain using a piece of rattan swirled by him inside the skull and to slice out the flesh using his war sword. This coconut-splitting ceremony is a sign of respect and honour to the guests being offered to do so. Other merrymaking activities which may extend to the next day include blowpipe (sumpit) contests and traditional games such as arm wrestling (bibat lengan), small log pulling (betarit lampong), rope pulling (tarit tali) and foot-banging (bapatis) with some also engage in cockfighting. In modern settings, sports include football, sepak takraw (rattan kickball) and futsal. Other parlour games are played such as egg rolling, plate passing to the tune of taboh music, running in gunny sacks, and balloon blowing, while karaoke and joget dance are also popular.

=== Dances ===
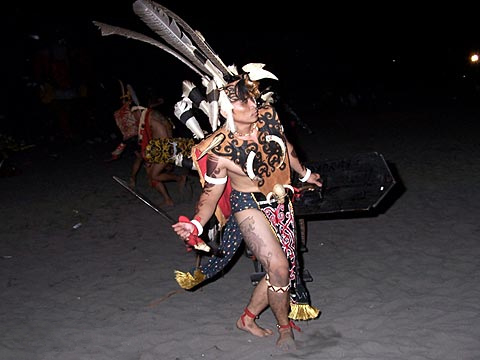
A Dayak man performing the Ngajat dance

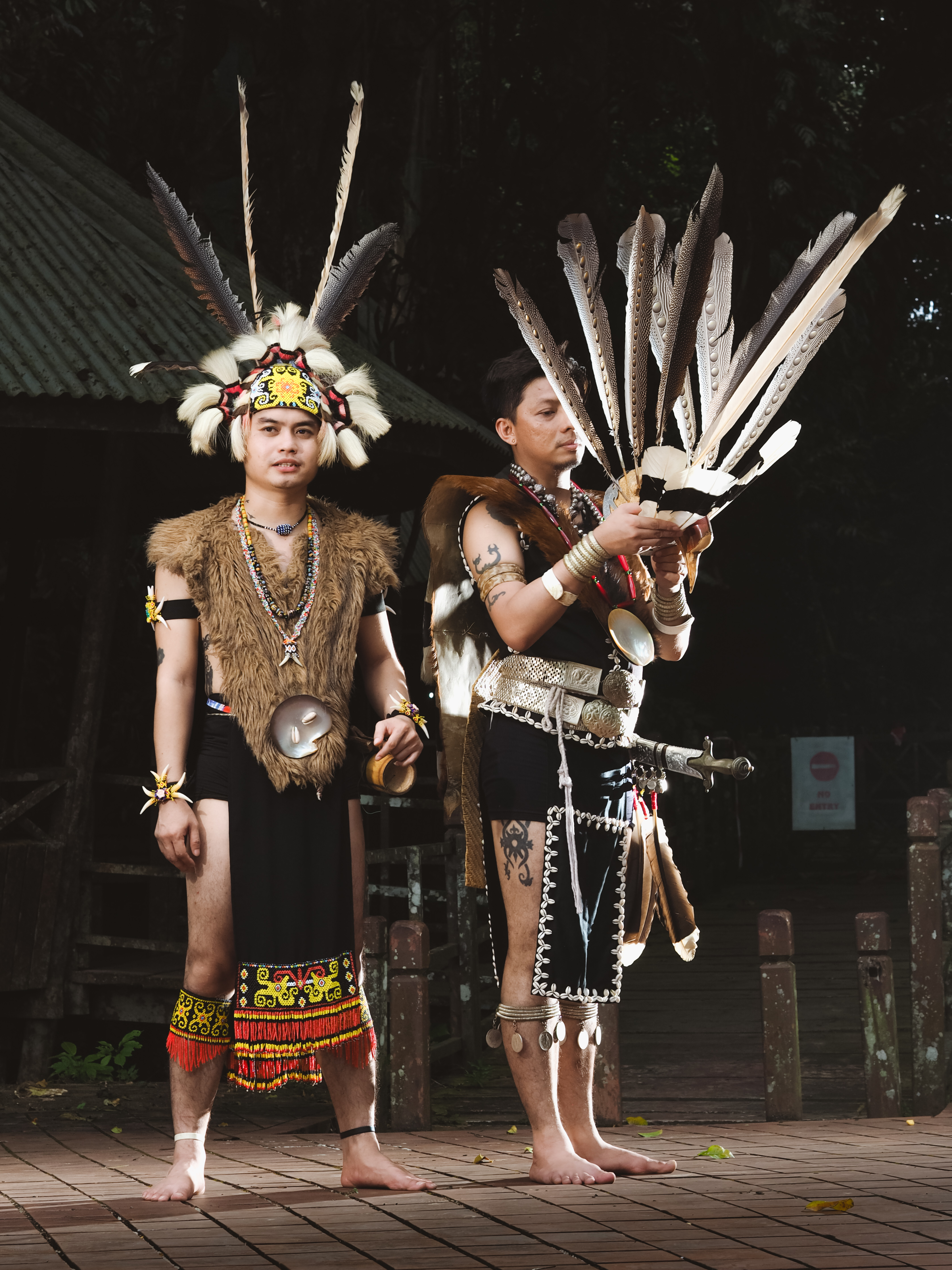
Orang Ulu and Iban Dayaks warrior in traditional dress before the warrior dance

The Ngajat dance is accompanied by a traditional band consisting of an engkerumong set (percussion), tawak (big gong), bebendai (small gong) and bedup (drum). Orang Ulu music is played using the sape. There are many variations of the traditional ngajat or ajat dance. The male and female dances consist of graceful, precise and surprise movements of the body, hands and feet with occasional shouts of a battle cry. Examples are the freestyle ajat male dance, warrior dance, ngajat lesong (rice mortar dance), the ngasu hunting dance, or comical muar kesa (ant harvesting) dance for men. Women perform the freestyle female ajat dance or the ngajat pua kumbu (ritual cloth waving dance). The male dance shows strength and bravery and may imitate the movements of the hornbill, which is regarded as the king of worldly birds.

Bidayuh Dayak dances include the tolak bala (danger repealing), a dance performed before the harvest to ask for blessing and protection of the community; the totokng dance that is performed during the harvest festival to welcome the paddy soul and guests; the langi julang which is performed at the closing of the harvest festival to thank gods for bestowing good health and a rich harvest; and the eagle-warrior fight dance performed after the harvest season. Hands are held outstretched imitating the movements of the eagles as they flap their wings during their journey. The eagle eventually falls unconscious so leaving the warrior victorious which is performed especially by men seeking for a female partner.

=== Ngabang ===
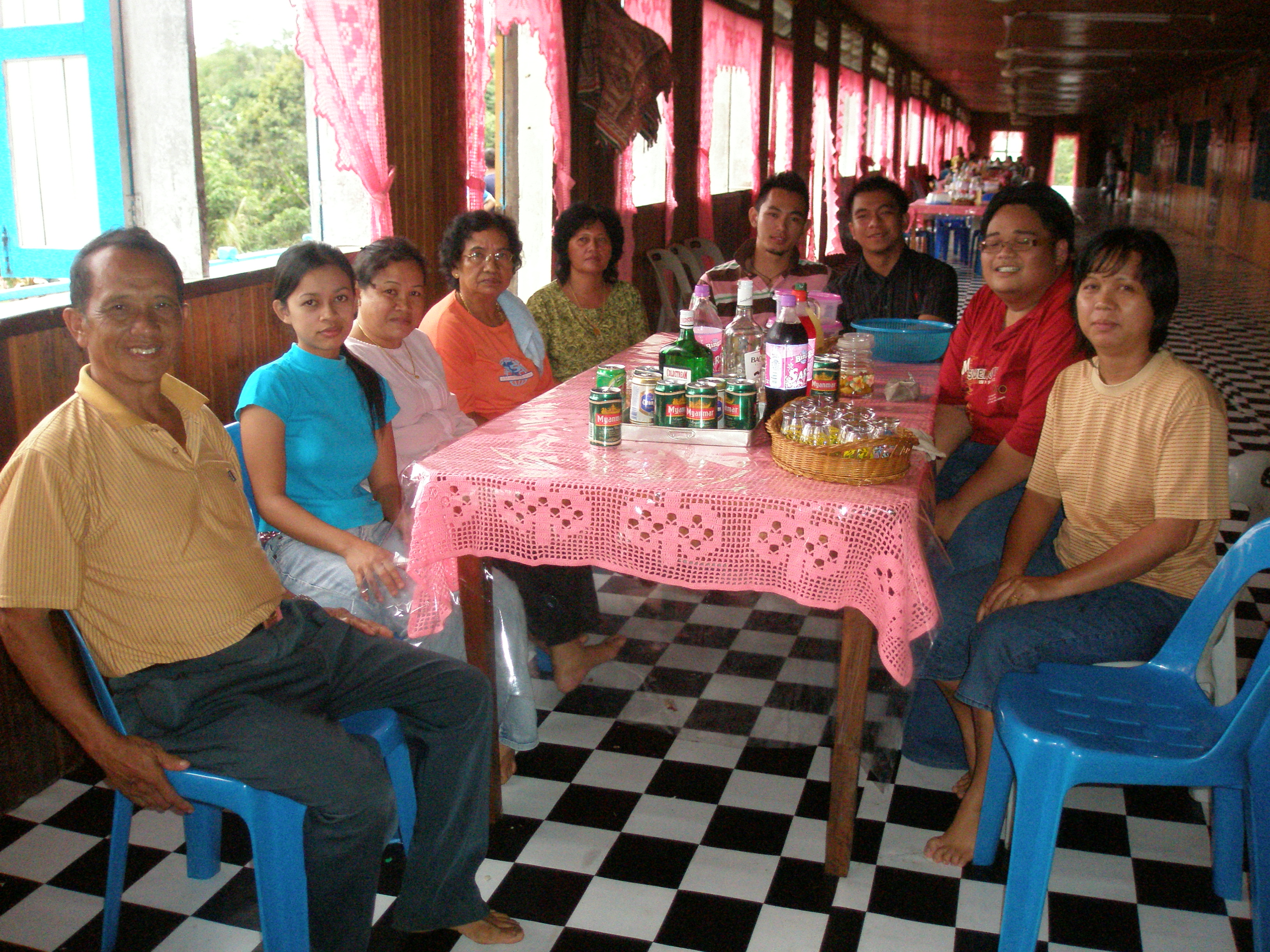
Tuak is widely consumed during the Gawai Dayak social and family gathering

On the first day of June, Dayak homes are opened to guests. This practice is called ngabang. Open houses may also be organised by Dayak associations or non-government organisations. This will continue until the end of June where the Gawai Dayak will be closed in a ngiling bidai (mat rolling up) ceremony. When guests arrive, tuak is offered and women line up in two rows on each side of the ladder (nyambut pengabang). The welcoming drink (ai tiki) is followed by the thirst-quenching drink (ai aus). Then, when the guests are seated, further rounds of tuak as a washing drink (ai basu), profit drink (ai untong) and respect drink (ai basa) are given. This activity is called the watering of guests or nyibur temuai.

Speeches are made such as the jaku ansah (sharpening speech) which introduces the guest of honour. The guest of honour is received with a miring offering ceremony outside the longhouse. Upon approaching the longhouse ladder, the guest of honour is asked to open a fort (muka kuta). This is represented by slashing a bamboo fence with a sword and a poem. Then, at the foot of the longhouse ladder, an animal is speared (mankan). In ngalu pengabang, guests led by ngajat dancers and followed by the band, process to their seats in the longhouse gallery. After that, a guest prayer (biau pengabang) is recited by a talented speaker like the headman or the lemambang bard while he sways holding a chicken over the heads of guests. Before the guests are offered foods, a special speech (muka kujuk in Iban) to open the traditional cloth covering over food containers is recited.

After eating, the families of the longhouse are visited by guests. A short longhouse may have ten to thirty family rooms while moderately long may have thirty to fifty family rooms. A very long longhouse may have fifty to one hundred family rooms. It is common for Dayaks to recite and discuss their genealogy (tusut in Iban) to reinforce kinships. In the activity called bantil (persuaded drinking), women offer drinks to men to help them overcome shyness. Men traditionally reject the first offers as a sign of respect to the host. Women sing a traditional poem called pantun while offering tuak. In the activity called uti, a special guest is asked to open a coconut placed on a ceramic plate using a blunt knife without handling the coconut or breaking the plate. The coconut offered to be split open by ordinary guests tells of someone's heart and fate: white flesh is good and black flesh is bad.

=== Pre-Gawai and closing ===
In town areas, pre-Gawai are held in May in advance of the Gawai proper before the citydwellers return to their respective villages. Gawai ends around the end of June. The closing ceremony is signified by symbolically rolling back a miring ceremony mat called a bidai by each family within the longhouse. It is known as Ngiling Bidai among Iban Dayaks.

=== Authentic ritual festivals ===
Gawai Dayak celebrations may last for a month. It is during this time of year that many Dayak hold authentic ritual festivals and weddings (Melah Pinang or Gawai Lelabi) take place. Most Iban will hold minor rites called bedara which can be bedara mata (an unripe offering) inside the family bilek room or bedara mansau (a ripe offering) at the family ruai gallery. Berunsur (cleansing) is performed at the family tanju (verandah). Rituals called gawa are the Sandau Ari (midday festival), Tresang Mansau (red bamboo pole) and Gawai Kalingkang.

Ritual feasts of the Saribas and Skrang region include Gawai Bumai (agricultural festival) which comprises Gawai Batu (whetstone festival), Gawai Benih (a paddy seed festival), gawai basimpan (paddy storing festival), and Gawai Burong (a bird festival). The bird festival is performed earlier in the festive period to avoid spoiling of rice wine by the spirit Indai Bilai if the entombment festival for the dead (Gawai Antu or Ngelumbong) is also held within the same longhouse. In the Baleh region, the Iban ritual festivals include the Gawai Baintu-intu (wellness festival), Gawai Bumai (farming festival), Gawai Amat (proper festival to request divine supernatural assistance), Gawai Ngelumbung (tomb-building festival) and Gawai Mimpi (festival based on dream messages from the spirits).

Fortune related festivals include a Gawai Mangkung Tiang (main house post hammering festival) for any newly completed longhouses; Gawai Tuah (fortune festival) which comprises three stages such as Gawai Ngiga Tuah (fortune seeking festival), Gawai Namaka Tuah (fortune welcoming festival) and Gawai nindokka tuah (fortune safekeeping festival) and Gawai Tajau (jar festival). The health-related festivals which may be performed are the Gawai Sakit (healing festival) which takes place if the belian rituals, sugi sakit (supernatural cleansing) or renong sakit (supernatural curing) are unsuccessful. For most of these traditional festivals, sacred invocation and incantations called pengap or timang are performed throughout the night(s) by a bard (lemambang) and his assistants or a manang (healer).

=== Christian celebrations ===
Christian Dayaks replace the traditional offering ceremony with a prayer session within the family room. The associated church service leader is called tuai sembiang.

Celebrations during Gawai Dayak
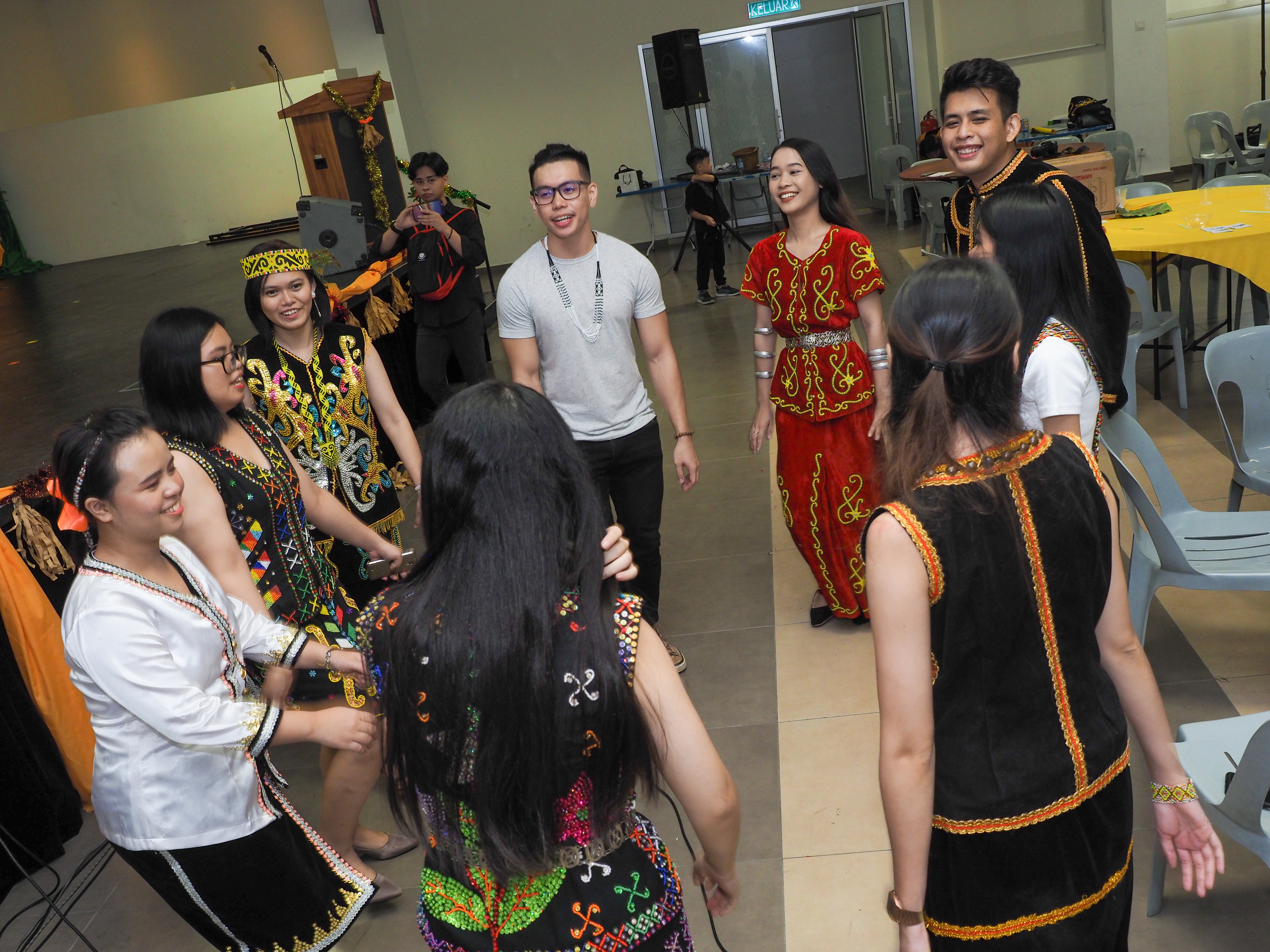
Social activities during a joint Gawai–Kaamatan celebration

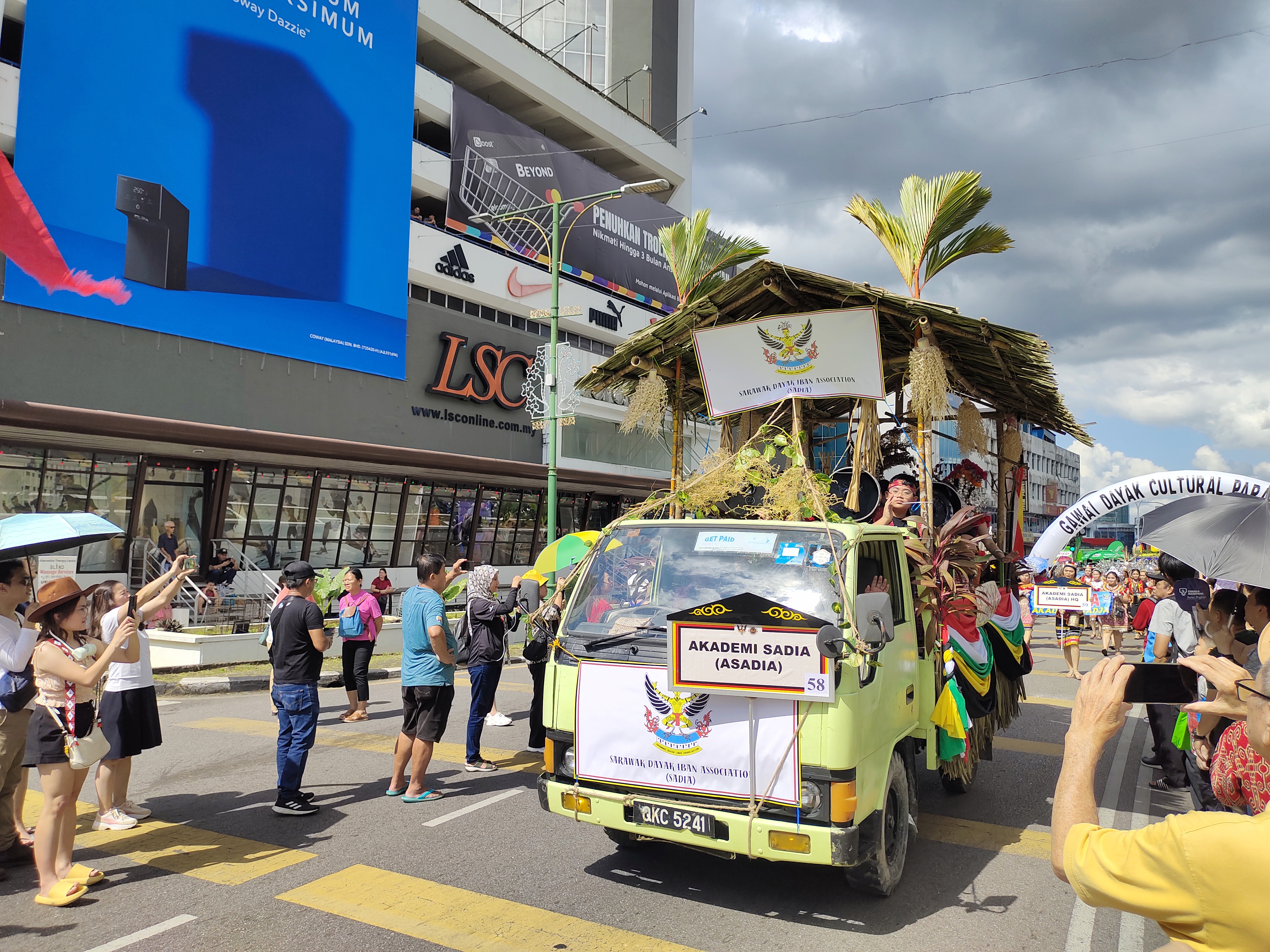
Gawai–Dayak cultural parade

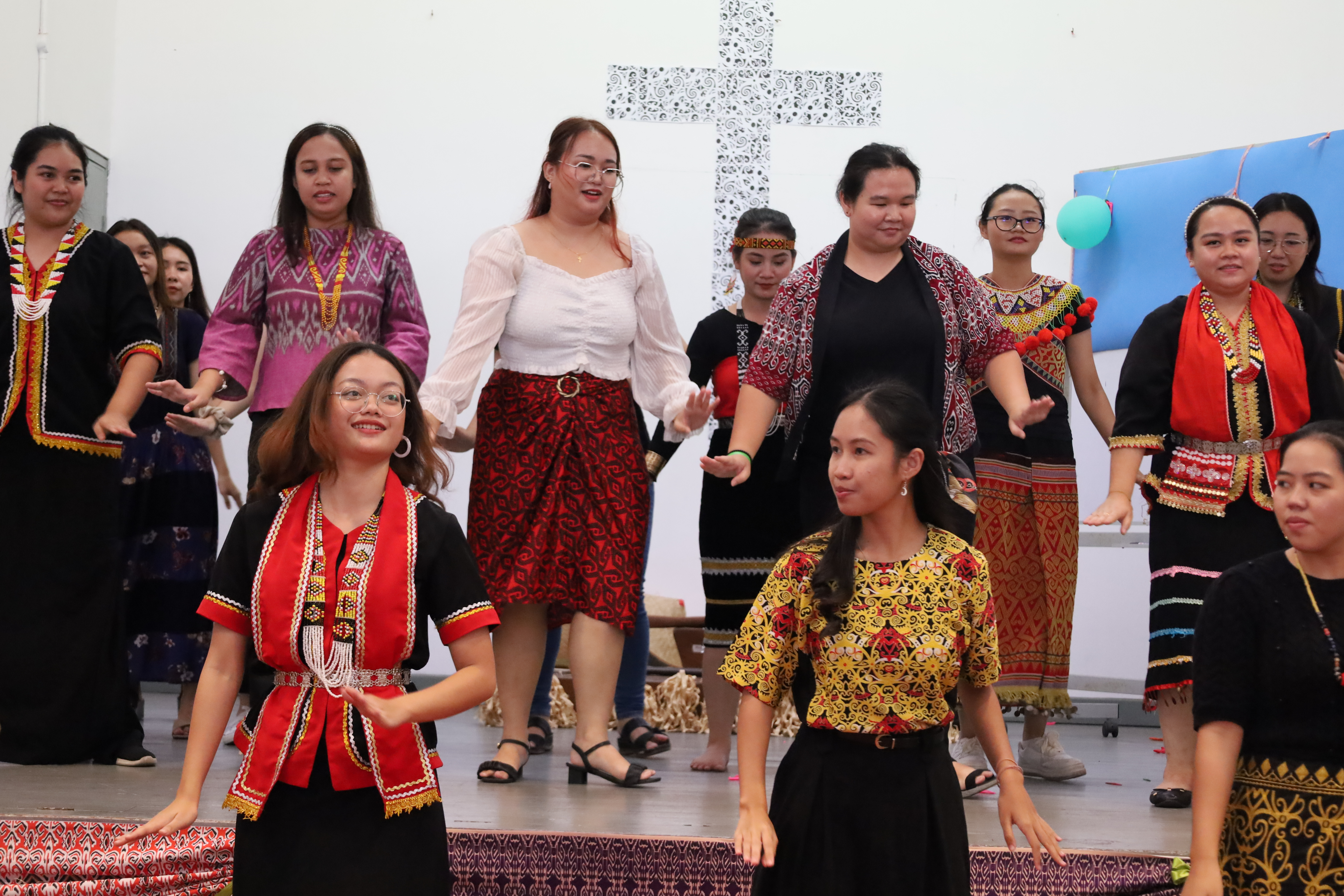
Gawai–Kaamatan joint celebration among the Sarawakian and Sabahan residing in Penang at the Church of the Assumption, 2024

== See also ==
- List of harvest festivals
- Kaamatan
