= Ngajat =

Malaysian traditional dance

Ngajat dance
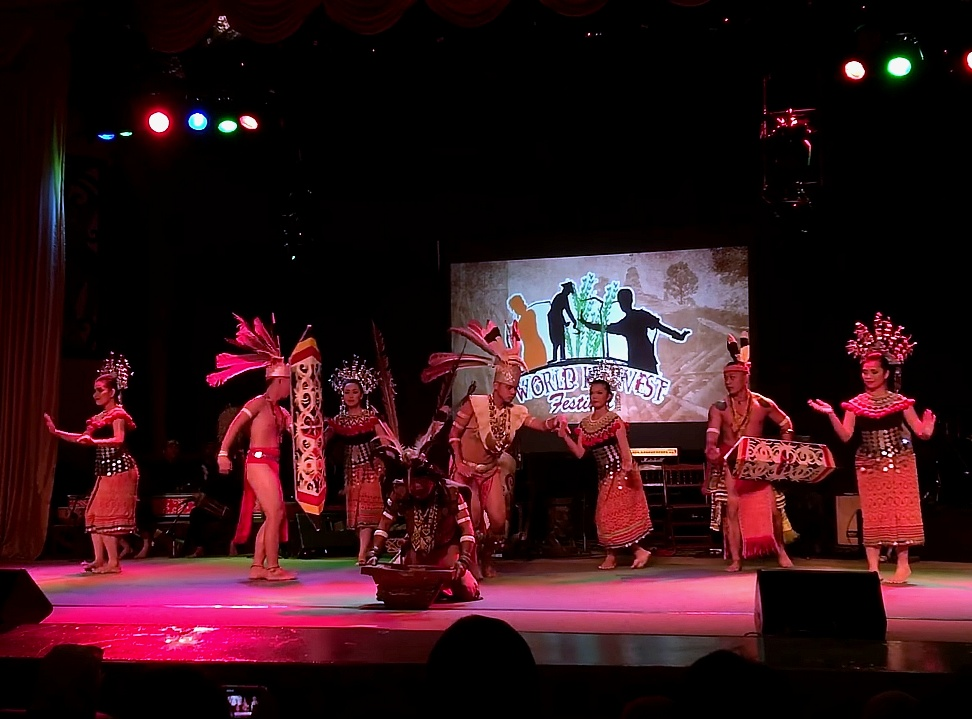
- The ngajat lesong dance performed at the Sarawak Cultural Village, Kuching District of Sarawak
- Native name: Tanda Ngajat
- Etymology: Kajat (jump) in the Iban language
- Genre: Traditional, folk
- Instrument(s): gongs, canang, ketebung, engkromong
- Inventor: Iban people
- Year: 16th century
- Origin: Sarawak, Malaysia

The Ngajat is a traditional dance performed by the Iban community of Sarawak in Malaysia, as well as Dayak Iban and Bidayuh communities in both neighbouring Brunei and West Kalimantan of Indonesia, where it consists of several further Ngajat dance classifications.

The dance is characterised by its graceful movements, often mimicking the actions of tribal warriors returning from battle or celebrating the harvest during Gawai. Male dancers often wear elaborate headdresses with feathers, shields such as terabai, and variety of swords such as ilang, jimpul, langgai tinggang, or niabor, while female dancers don intricate Pua Kumbu costumes and ngepan headdresses.

Both the Malaysian federal and Sarawak state governments have declared the dance, its music, and traditional clothing as a national heritage which includes the ritual processes and tools that are classified as the Iban tangible and intangible cultural heritage.

== History ==
The history of the Ngajat dance begins with the ancestors of the Iban community following the movements of the common hill myna and the great argus. According to an oral interview with an Iban person from Lubok Antu, Sarawak, the ancestors of the Iban community dreamed of coming to a remote village. There, they looked for a place to grow rice and a place to hunt, and they came across the footprints of a common hill myna. When they saw the footprints, the movement seemed to be a Ngajat dance that made them follow the movement. While dancing, they looked up the mountain and saw a great argus. The great argus flapped and spread its wings as if they were a human hand. They began to follow its movements, which resulted in the creation of the movements of "Bungai Ajat" as well as "Bunga Ajat". This became the reason when the Iban people dance and play music, the common hill myna will also move its legs, while the great argus will move its wings. Despite it being unknown when the dance was first introduced, it is strongly believed to be associated with the Iban ethnic group since the 16th century.

== Clothing ==
Male dancers wear traditional costumes like "mesh", "gagung" or bird clothes. Gagung is a kind of thick and hard armour made of animal skin such as bear in the past which has been replaced with the current Jamnapari breed goatskin bought from neighbouring Indonesia where it is known as Etawah, but not stitched on the sides with dancers also wear hats decorated with feathers. Female dancers dubbed "Kumang", they wear clothes such as a headdress, hooks high on the chest, cloth tied at the waist, hands and feet bracelets and earrings.

== Musical equipment ==
Musical instruments include large and medium gongs (tawak and bebendai), drums or ketebung/dumba and a set of small gongs engkromong. Belikan is another string instrument used to perform ngajat dance.

== Types ==
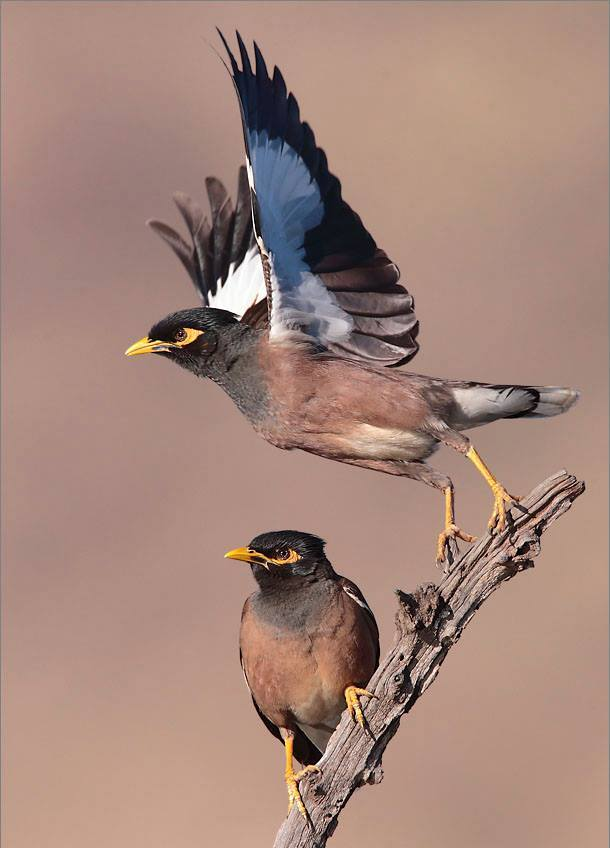
Common hill myna as the symbol of Ngajat movements.

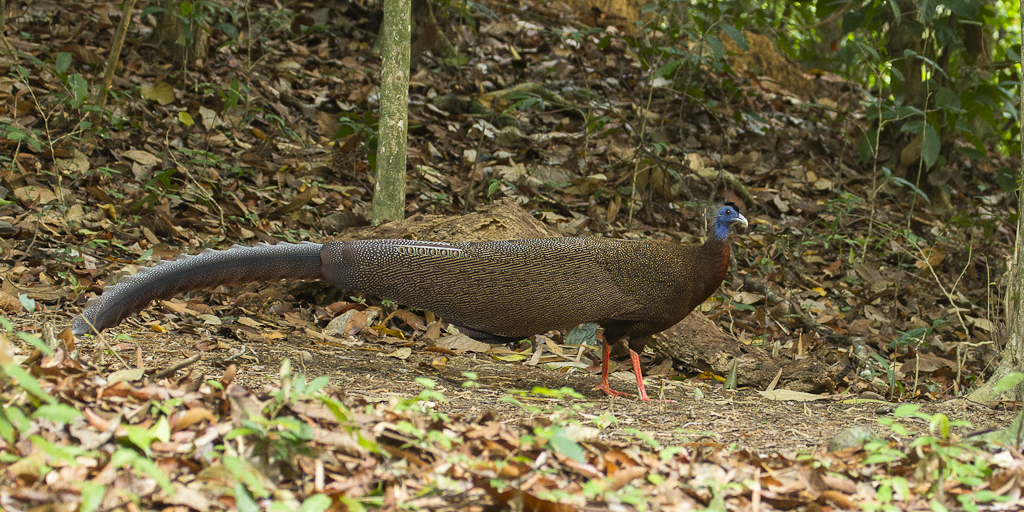
Great argus as the symbol of Ngajat movements.

Ngajat consists of several types, including:

- Ngajat Serakup [nga-jat se-ra-kup]: A standardised version of Ngajat for stage performance, a Malaysian school lesson made by the Dayak Dance And Cultural Association in Sarawak to unite the region's Iban through arts and dance. The version was believed to have originated in the early 80s and was modernised in the late 90s. Nowadays, Ngajat Serakup is widely used as a performance in Sarawak, with some of the Ibans in Brunei and West Kalimantan also using the steps in Ngajat Serakup of Sarawak because of its uniqueness, complexity and elegance.
- Ngajat Bebunoh [nga-jat bē-bu-nuēh]: Presented by the young men of the community, this dance is a replication or repetition of what men do when confronted by enemies or as they engage in daily activities such as hunting.
- Ngajat Lesong [nga-jat lē-suēng]: Illustrates the manifestation of power and masculinity in Iban males. This traditional practice highlights a warrior showcasing his strength by lifting a wooden rice mortar weight from 7 kilograms (15 lb) to around 20 kilograms (44 lb) (lesong kayu) with his teeth during a dance and concludes with the meticulous placement of the mortar on the floor, culminating in a swift heel touch on the stage.
- Ngajat Berayah [nga-jat bē-ra-yæh]
- Ngajat Induk [nga-jat in-duq], Ngajat Semain [nga-jat sē-ma-yiēn] or Ngajat Pua Kumbu [nga-jat pu-waq kum-bouq]: Usually performed by women. As this dance is called Pua Kumbu, which is a traditional Iban fabric, the dancers would dance while carrying the Pua Kumbu as the main display in their performance. This dance is usually performed during Gawai Kelingkang, a celebration to prepare or mark the success of the notorious Ngayau (headhunting) in the past, a parade of warriors carrying the head of an enemy approaching the longhouse would be greeted by dancers. The head heroine of the Kelingkang would then put the "nutmeg" in the comb. With a shout of victory and the sound of a bat, the Pua Kumbu dancers lead the procession towards the tanju (outer platform of the longhouse), swinging a crocodile that contains the enemy's head in the back while calling for protection from the captive spirit. Before the parade of maidens reaches the stage of the ceremony, a pig will be offered to the ancestors. The Pua Kumbu dancers will then continue to swing the enemy's head, followed by the warrior. After seven rounds, the head will be hung on a tree. In the modern days, the enemy's head symbolisation is replaced with a coconut.
- Ngajat Muka Kuta [nga-jat mu-kaq ku-ta]: Ngajat kuta is another type of dance performance that combines male and female dancers. It is usually performed for celebrations such as the opening of Iban cultural events.
- Ngajat Ngalu Temuai [nga-jat nga-lu tē-mu-way]: Presented for the purpose of welcoming special guests. Usually this dance is performed during the opening of an official ceremony attended by many honoured guests and the public. The dance is performed while accompanying guests to the leader of the longhouse. This dance is a welcome for guests who come to the longhouse during Gawai or during other festivals.
- Ngajat Mai Antu Pala [nga-jat ma-yiq an-tu pa-laq]: Ngajat for those Iban is a welcome dance during Gawai Day, before the war and after the harvest season. In the old days the dance was performed after their return from the war. Dancers stand on the circle and jump accompanied by the music. For Gawai Sandau Ari, a drum is played for the guests of honour. In a variant, the dancer holds a wooden shield in his left hand and a sword in his right hand and dances facing the enemy with his body swinging to the left and to the right.

== In the 21st century ==
=== International performances ===
In 2013, Ngajat dance was represented at the Cheonan Heungtaryeong World Dance Festival in Cheonan, South Korea, with the Malaysian team under the Universiti Teknologi Petronas (UTP) Performing Arts Group winning an "Encouragement Award". In 2023, the dance was represented at the same festival, with the UTP team won a gold prize. In 2024, the dance was represented again at the festival with UTP clinching a bronze prize. During the 2024 World Performing Arts Championships in Long Beach, California of the United States, Dion Das Louis, an eight-year-old dancer from Sarawak, won two gold medals by bringing through the dance performances.
