= Red Light Lizzie =

Procurer in 1860s and 70s New York City

- Occupations: Madam and procuress
- Known for: prostitution empire in New York during the 1860s and '70s; rival of Jane the Grabber.

Red Light Lizzie (fl. 1860 –1875) was the pseudonym of an American madam, procuress and underworld figure in New York City during the mid-to late 19th century.

During the 1860s and 1870s, she controlled much of New York City's prostitution, along with Jane the Grabber. Like her rival, Lizzie employed a number of men and women to travel to rural communities in Upstate New York and New England to lure young girls to the city with promises of well-paying jobs. Some men were paid by Lizzie to bring girls into dive bars where, similar to Shanghaiing, they would be given drugged alcohol. The victims would then be forced into prostitution, either by working in her brothels or being "sold" to similar establishments. Both she and Jane the Grabber specialized in procuring women from wealthy families.

She owned at least twelve "houses of ill-repute" and was so successful as a procurer that she sent a monthly circular letter to all of her clients.
