= Hester Jane Haskins =

Procuress in 1860s and 70s New York City

Jane the Grabber
- Born: Hester Jane Haskins
- Occupation: Procuress
- Known for: Procuress and underworld figure in New York City during the 1860s and 1870s, popularly known as "Jane the Grabber".

Hester Jane Haskins or Jane the Grabber (fl. 1860–1875) was an American madam, procuress, and underworld figure in New York City during the 1860s and 1870s. The main rival of Red Light Lizzie, she owned and operated several "houses of ill fame" as well being a chief supplier of prostitutes to bordellos, brothels, and similar establishments throughout the city. She employed a small group of "respectable-looking men and women", numbering a dozen or so, who traveled New England luring young women with promises of exciting jobs back in New York. Once these women arrived, they were abducted and forced to work in her or her clients' establishments.

Haskins was one of the first and most successful procuresses in what would become known as white slavery. Among her criminal associates were John Allen and Little Susie, then among her top agents, but left her service after Haskins began targeting young girls from prominent New England families during the early 1870s; one of her victims was alleged to have been the daughter of a lieutenant governor in New England. In 1875, less than a year after the departure of Allen and Susie, Haskins was implicated during what was known as the "grabber scandal" when she was arrested by Captain Charles McDonnell and given a long prison sentence.
