= Oliver Dyer =

American journalist (1824–1907)

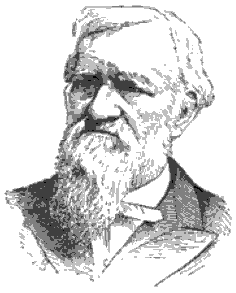
- Born: April 26, 1824; Porter, New York, United States
- Died: January 13, 1907 (aged 82); Massachusetts Homeopathic Hospital, Boston, Massachusetts, US
- Resting place: Forest Hills Cemetery
- Occupation(s): Journalist, author, teacher, lawyer and stenographer
- Known for: Developed the first widely used system of shorthand during the mid-19th century, and is credited for introducing stenography in the U.S.; headed public crusade against New York underworld figure John Allen in 1868.
- Parent: Jeremiah Dyer

Oliver Dyer (April 26, 1824 – January 13, 1907) was an American journalist, author, teacher, lawyer and stenographer. A pioneer in phonography, he developed his own shorthand system which was the first to be adopted for use in the United States. It was used not only for courtroom testimony but also for recording political events such as the Free Soil Convention in Buffalo, New York, and sessions of the 30th United States Congress in Washington, D.C., in 1848. It was in the latter role that he became the first Congressional shorthand reporter.

Dyer also had a successful career as a columnist for a number of popular publications, such as the Brooklyn Daily Eagle, New York Ledger and The Sun, during the 1850s and 60s. He was prominent among the reformers who campaigned against the various saloons, clubs and other "immoral establishments" of New York's underworld. His 1868 exposé of John Allen caused the saloon keeper to become infamously known as "the wickedest man in New York" and forced to close his dance hall. Dyer was also one of the signatories of the Water Street Revival "street preaching" document, which supported attempts by religious leaders to convince saloon keepers and other criminal figures to abandon crime as a way of life.

== Biography ==
Born in Porter, New York on April 26, 1824, Oliver Dyer moved with his parents to Lockport where his father, Jeremiah Dyer, opened a shoemaking shop. Dyer spent most of his early life in the city and became a schoolteacher in 1840. During this time, he became interested in phonography, a popular type of shorthand system then being used in Great Britain, and soon developed his own system. A student of Sir Isaac Pitman, developer of Pitman shorthand, Dyer initially practiced by copying Sunday sermons verbatim and later began teaching phonography classes in which he demonstrated his new system. He began teaching and lecturing in cities across the county. In Philadelphia, he established the first American shorthand periodical, the American Phonographic Journal, as well as the first experimental classes in shorthand at Central High School. After receiving permission from the school, he taught a volunteer after-school class of 250 students free of charge from which would emerge some of the most prominent shorthand writers of the period such as Dennis F. Murphy. These classes were so popular, with the students showing much promise, that shorthand was officially added to the school's curriculum the next year under a regular instructor.

Dyer's system became widely used throughout the decade, and Dyer was eventually considered the leading authority on shorthand in the United States. In 1847, he began supplying the first phonographic reports published by the New York Tribune and for a newspaper in Toronto, the latter being the first published in Canada. This system was especially used in courtroom testimony and was used to record the proceedings of the national Free Soil Convention in Buffalo, New York, on August 9–10, 1848. Dyer later travelled to Washington, D.C. to record sessions of 30th Congress as its first shorthand reporter. He was a strong supporter of the abolitionist movement and often had disagreements with then Congressman Horace Greeley. Dyer studied law while living in Washington, but later chose to pursue a career in journalism instead.

By the early 1850s, Dyer was a full-time writer for a number of magazines and publications such as the Brooklyn Daily Eagle, New York Ledger and The Sun. It was in the field of journalism that he gained his greatest fame. In 1852 as editor of the Musical World and Times, he hired Fanny Fern from Boston as the first woman to have her own newspaper column, to great success and rapid fame. The next year he helped her find a publisher for her first book, which became a major bestseller in its first year. She was such a success that by 1855 she was the highest-paid newspaper writer in the nation.

Dyer was an outspoken critic of saloons, clubs and other immoral establishments which typified the New York underworld. In 1868, he was hired by Silas S. Packard shortly after his founding of the magazine Packard's Monthly. That summer, Dyer wrote an exposé on saloon keeper John Allen, a one-time religious student involved in prostitution and murder, for which Allen gained infamy as "The Wickedest Man in New York". He later had "a truthful biography" published about Allen, The Wickedest Man in New York: "Truth Stanger [sic] Than Fiction", which became very popular not only in New York but around the country. It also made Packard's Monthly very successful and set the tone for future stories; the magazine's official slogan became "truth is stranger than fiction". Even Allen, despite his notoriety, embraced his new-found publicity by pasting copies of the article in the windows and on the bar mirror of his dance hall, and had business cards printed up using the title "Wickedest Man in New York" as the owner. This led some reformers to criticize Dyer for advertising the red light and vice districts of the Fourth Ward.

Dyer was also associated with the so-called "Water Street Revival", in part due to his writings for Packard's Monthly. He was one of the signatories to the "street preaching" document which gave support to religious leaders' efforts to convince saloon keepers and other criminal figures to abandon crime as a way of life. They persuaded John Allen and others to allow their establishments to be used by missionaries for prayer meetings and other church services. The New York Times eventually exposed the revival movement as a fraud. Dyer's public crusade against Allen resulted in the close of his Water Street dance hall, and Allen died two years later.

In his later years, Dyer became a published author on a wide variety of subjects, ranging from religious writings and political topics, such as the effects of Reconstruction, and the history of The New York Sun. He also wrote biographies on fellow journalist Henry Woodfin Grady, historian George Bancroft, and former U.S. Presidents Andrew Jackson and James A. Garfield. In 1876, his spiritual journey took another turn, and he was ordained as a minister in the Swedenborgian faith after years of service in Washington, D.C. and New York City.

Dyer died of bronchitis at the Massachusetts Homeopathic Hospital in Boston, Massachusetts on the afternoon of January 13, 1907. His funeral service was held three days later at the Church of New Jerusalem on Bowdoin Street, officiated by Rev. H. Clinton Hay with hymns performed by the Schubert Quartet, before his burial at Forest Hills Cemetery.

== Bibliography ==
- Oliver Dyer's Phonographic Report of the Proceedings of the National Free Soil Convention at Buffalo, N.Y. August 9th and 10th, 1848 (1848)
- Views of Astronomy: Seven Lectures Delivered Before the Mercantile Library Association of New York (1848)
- Speeches of Defendants' Counsel and the Charge of Judge Burnside in the Case of Hinchman vs. Richie (1849)
- The Wickedest Man in New York: "Truth Stanger [sic] Than Fiction," as Illustrated in the Great Religious Excitement in New York (1868)
- How A Daily Newspaper Is Made (1870)
- The New York Sun: Its Rise, Progress, Character, and Condition (1870)
- The Death of President Garfield: God in History (1881)
- Six Sermons on Leading New-Church Doctrines (1887)
- Great Senators of the United States Forty Years Ago (1889)
- The New South (1890)
- History of the Battle of Lake Erie, and Miscellaneous Papers (1891, with George Bancroft)
- Life and Writings of George Bancroft (1891)
- General Andrew Jackson, Hero of New Orleans and Seventh President of the United States (1891)
- The Boy Patriot: or, From Poverty to the Presidency, Being the Story of the Life of General Jackson (1893)
