= Pua Kumbu =

Traditional ceremonial cloth of the Iban people

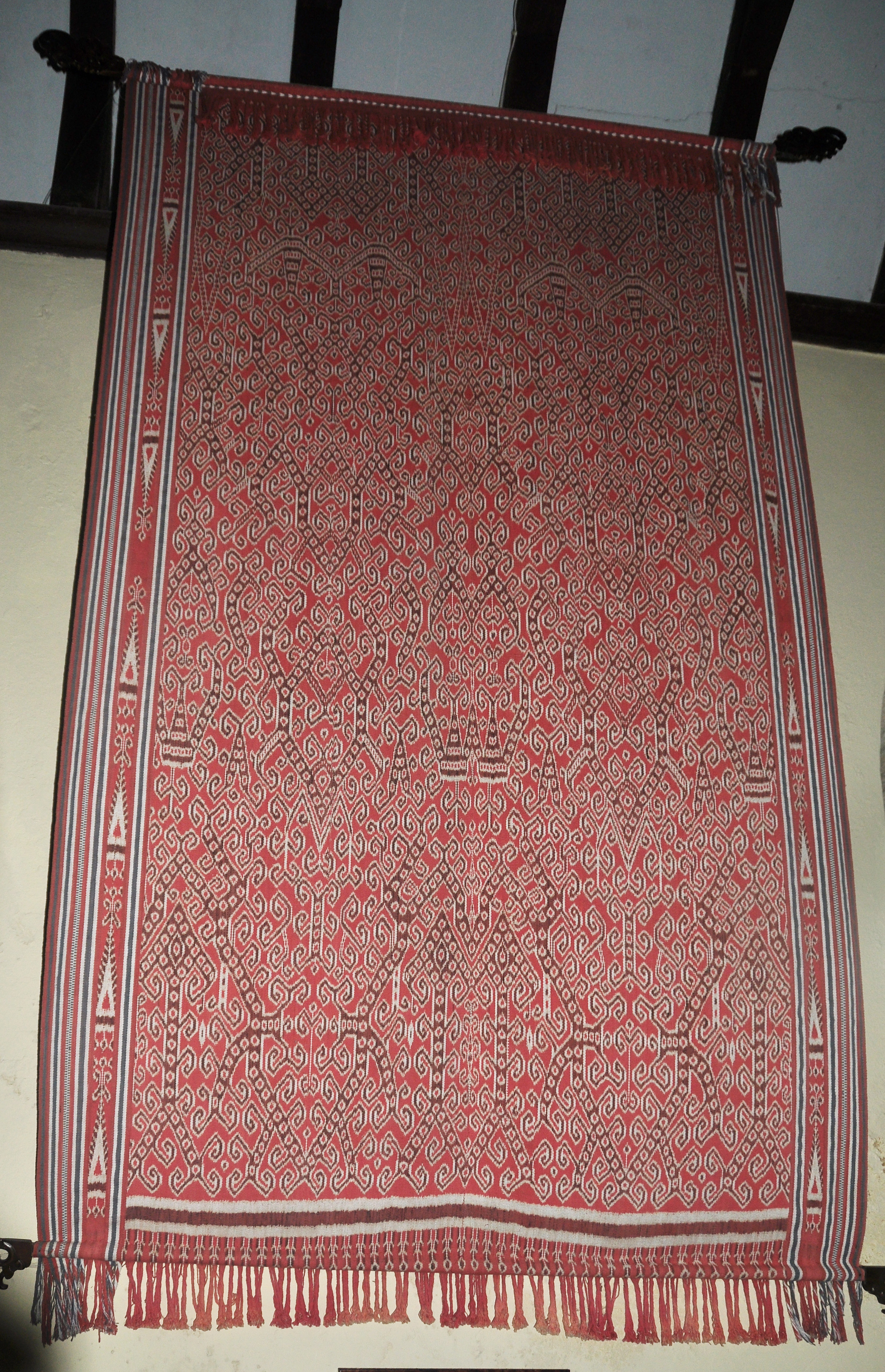
- A Pua Kumbu at the St Leonard's Anglican Church in Sheepstor of Dartmoor, England, donated to the church by the people of Sarawak in memory of the White Rajahs of Raj of Sarawak
- Type: Traditional patterned multi-coloured ceremonial clothing
- Material: Cotton
- Place of origin: Sarawak
- Manufacturer: Iban people

Pua Kumbu is a traditional patterned multi-coloured ceremonial cotton clothing created and occasionally worn by the Iban people of Sarawak in Malaysia, West Kalimantan of Indonesia, and Brunei during varieties of the ethnic festive such as Gawai and other Dayak celebrations. It is a sacred cloth among the Dayaks especially the female community, with any Pua Kumbu that was made may tell a weaver's personal story or a mythological tale which represents the purpose for which it has been woven.

== Etymology ==
The woven cloth of Pua Kumbu carries the meaning of a blanket used to "cover" or "wrap" one's body. The word Pua means blanket while Kumbu is referred to be the cover, which is also defined as a blanket made by ikat (tie) or kebat (dye) processes that was used as a ritual textile.

== History ==
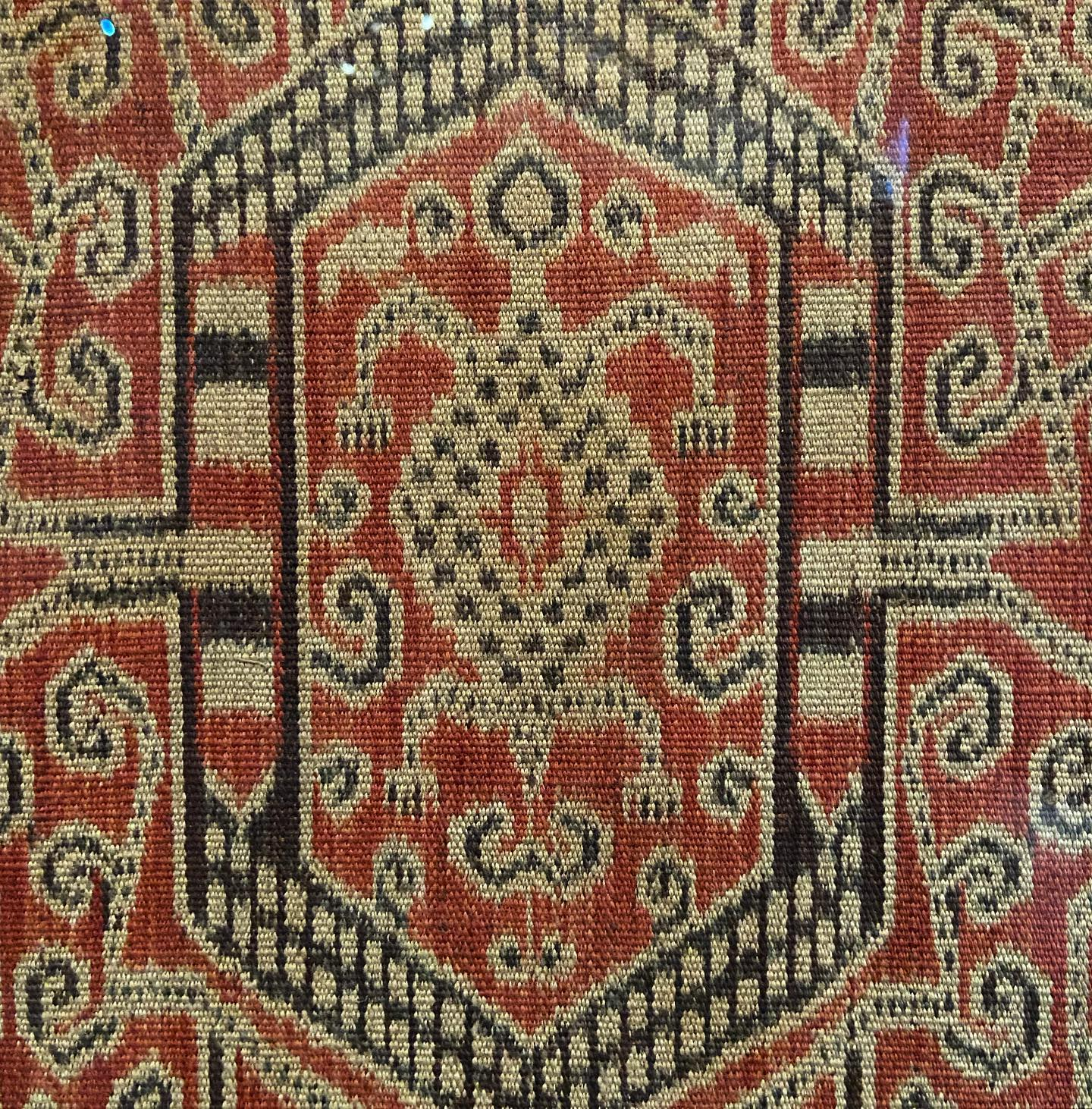
Textile from the Ibans of Sarawak, Malaysia

The oldest textiles of Sarawak were recovered at the Niah National Park, which is home to the 40,000 year old Niah Man. Mat fragment that were uncovered are mostly associated with burials with some graves are found with woven "winding sheets", the earliest dated from c. 500 B.C. The burying of the dead with their best clothes and graves gifts such as jewellery continues to be practised among some of the indigenous groups. In 2012, Pua Kumbu was declared as a Fine Art National Heritage by the National Heritage Department of Malaysia. Since the recognition, the elements of Pua Kumbu are getting more recognisable and influencing a variety of shirt patterns.

In West Kalimantan, attempts at preservation of Iban textiles received resentment and protest from the indigenous female community in the early 1970s, where the Pua Kumbu was burnt and accusations such as "trying to keep the indigenous primitive" and "frozen in time" were spread. By the 2020s, there began a growing interest in the textile with further encouragement towards the local provincial government to preserve the indigenous culture legacy.

== Pua Kumbu folktales ==
The origin of Pua Kumbu can be traced through the many myths and folklores of the Ibans, with the most prominent ones being the Dara Tinchin Temaga and Menggin stories. The story goes on when Menggin, a skilful Iban hunter, goes to the deep forest of Borneo in search of game. During the hunting, he encountered a hornbill, which he shot with his blowpipe and fell to the ground. He rushed towards the target, only to be greeted by a beautiful woman screaming in pain, and the hornbill was nowhere to be seen. The woman later became his wife, and they are blessed with a son.

As days passed, his wife used to weave special clothes and constantly gaze at the sky while feeding their infant. Menggin was always curious about Tinchin, but he was forbidden from asking the background of his wife as a term for their marriage. With the increase of her husband's curiosity, Tinchin finally revealed that she is the daughter of the Iban God of Singalang Burong, and with the broken term, she needs to leave both her husband and son to return to her original place. Prior to her departure, two handwoven clothes, the Pua Kumbu, were left for both the husband and son to wear whenever they visit her in her realm. Since then, the clothes were passed down through the Ibans for generations, and their ethnic women continue to weave similar clothes to attain proximity with their God and the spiritual realm.

== Design ==
Pua Kumbu uses "bent design" in its artwork, which consists of straight lines connected at various angles. The basic element of a Pua Kumbu design is an Empit or "Rhomb/rhombus" as its base pattern with Kunchi or "Key" attached to it as branches or leaves.

== Dyeing and weaving process ==
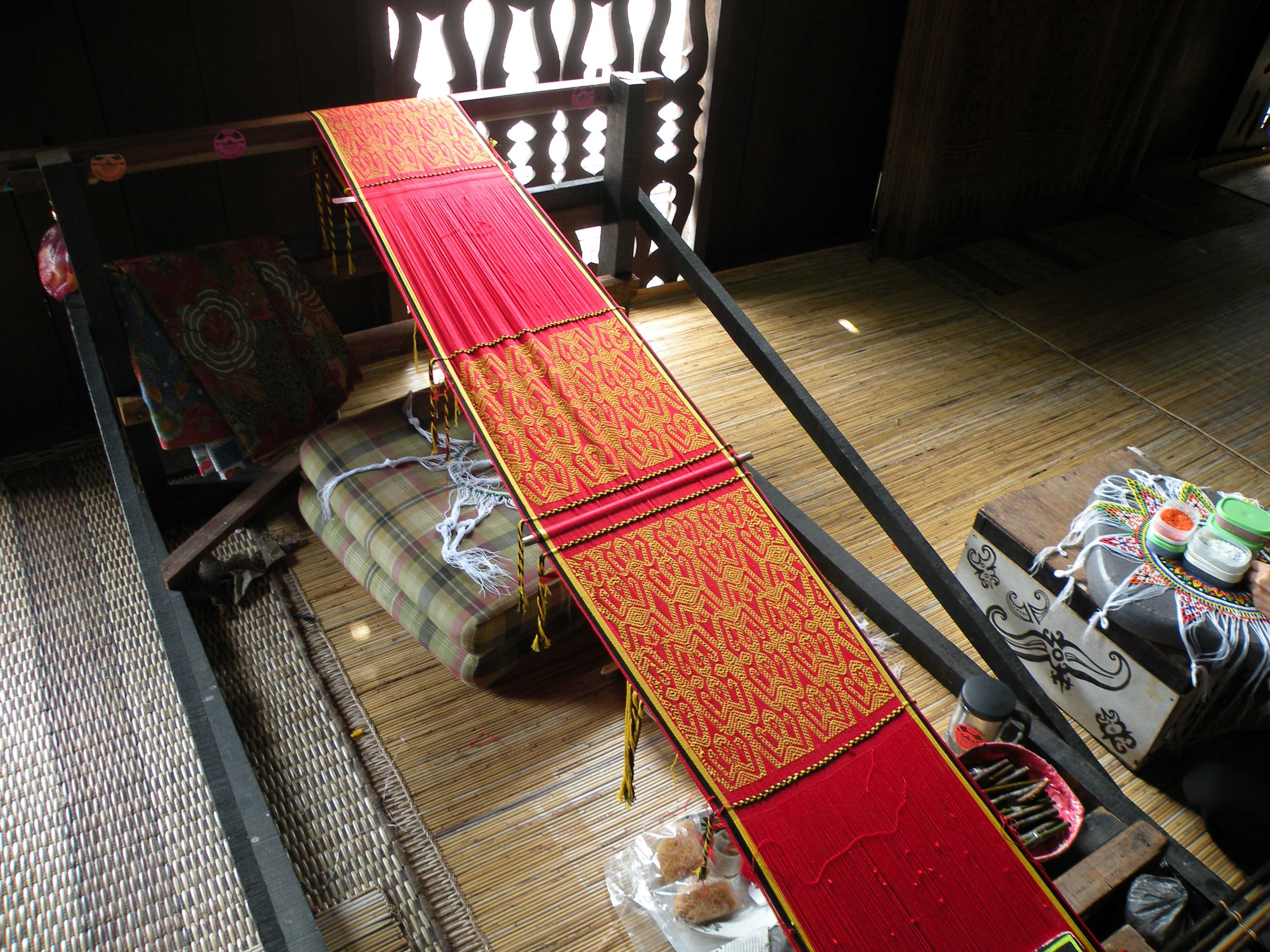
The weaving of Pua Kumbu

The process starts with preparing the yarn for the weaving, which consists of the following:

- Nabu' – winding the thread into balls
- Muai – to sort out
- Ngirit – the process of stretching and pulling a skin of thread horizontally, one thead at a time, to form the base or warp
- Ngarap – the selection of alternate warp
- Ngebat – tying
- Mampul – to cover
- Muka' tanchang – untying
- Ngerembai – unfolding
- Anak and Ara – adding side designs

The time to produce pua kumbu takes quite a long time with the carving process takes one week, while producing the colours using engkudu takes around 15 days. The mampul process takes three days while the ngupak process takes another two days. Another week is needed to weave the pua kumbu until it is finished.

=== Weaving ===
In order to prepare for the weaving process, the yarns are unfolded and carefully arranged on a wooden frame. Before the actual weaving begins, the side sections of the unfolded yarn known as anak or ara are carefully arranged. Nenun or weaving is done using a backstrap loom placed in a convenient spot within the longhouse. The final stage involves finishing of the top and bottom edges with a crowfeet pattern.

=== Dyeing ===
All of the raw materials for the natural dyes are harvested from the rainforest with the Ibans in both Sarawak and West Kalimantan have traditionally made use of a large number of plants to produce a range of rich beautiful dyes. The rengat (marsdenia tinctoria) plant produces an indigo colour in many different tones. The akar penawar landak (fibraurea tinctoria) is used to obtain yellow colour dye. For the mengkudu (morinda citrifolia) dye, if kapok (ceiba pentandra) or quicklime is added the colour will turn brown. The yarn is dipped into the combination, turned until it is well saturated and left to soak before it is dried under the sun. After the dye process yarns are further prepared by tying sections to build up the design.

== In the media ==
The National Film Department of Malaysia (Malay: Filem Negara Malaysia) produced a 16-minute documentary about Pua Kumbu in 1993 and has been aired on Radio Televisyen Malaysia (RTM) and TV Pendidikan.

== See also ==
- List of Intangible Cultural Heritage elements in Malaysia
- List of Intangible Cultural Heritage elements in Indonesia
