= Prayer meeting =

Religious meeting for lay people

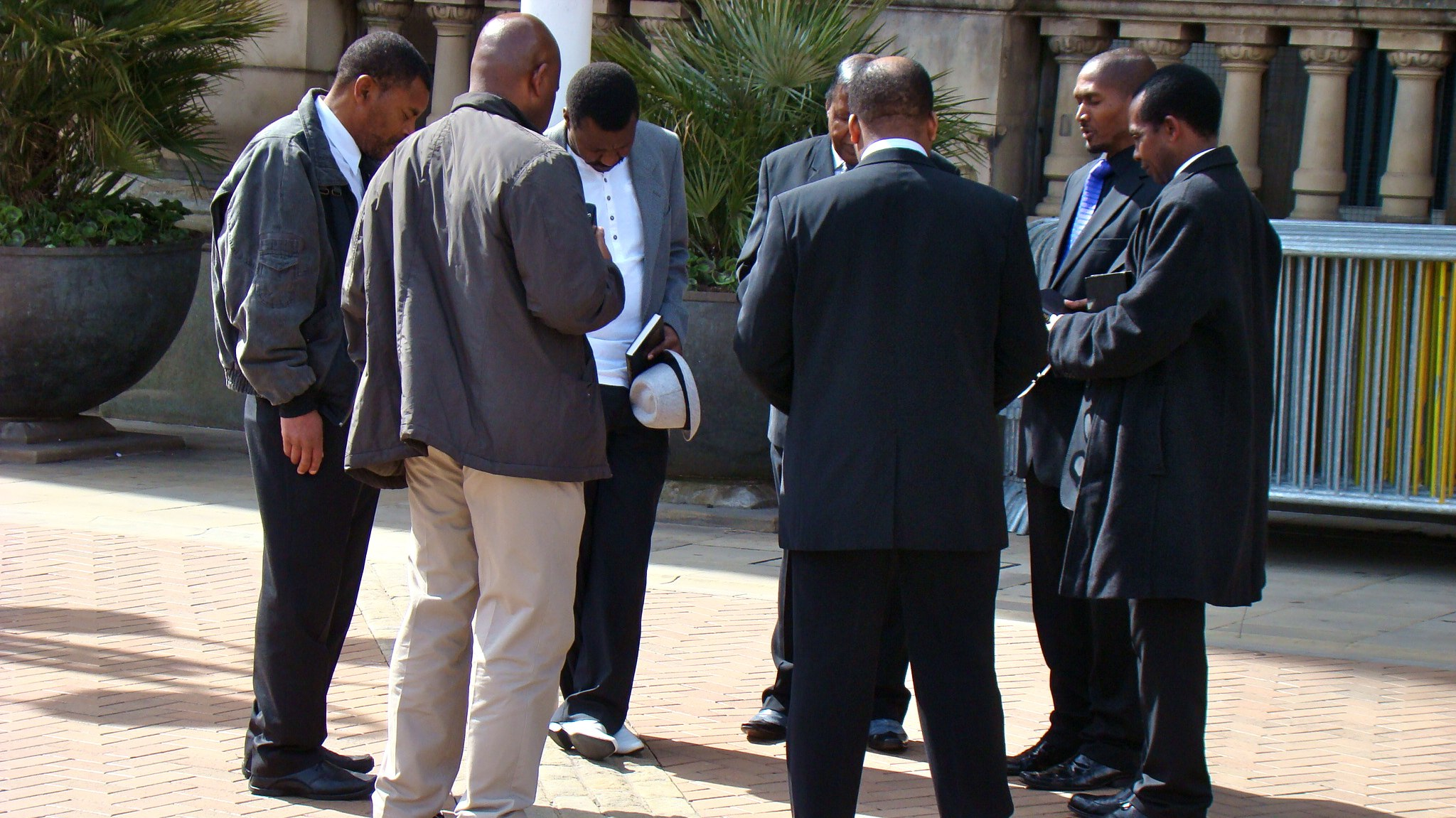
A prayer meeting in Victoria Square, Birmingham

A prayer meeting is a group of lay people getting together for the purpose of prayer as a group. Prayer meetings are typically conducted outside regular services by one or more members of the clergy or other forms of religious leadership, but they may also be initiated by decision of non-leadership members as well.

== Location ==
Prayer meetings may be held in public places, private homes, or small or large agreed-upon meeting places. Public prayer meetings may sometimes represent more than one religious faith, especially where the purpose for the prayer meeting involves a city or larger social unit.

The choice of venue depends on the intended participants, the purpose of the prayer meeting, and the size of the prayer meeting. Prayer meetings can consist of fewer than a dozen people. At the other end of the scale, the largest prayer meetings may involve several thousand people.

Prayer meetings are most commonly held at churches, mosques, or other houses of worship on days other than the normal day of worship. This is most common where only regular members of the house of worship are expected to attend, although the public is usually welcome to attend a prayer meeting. The smallest prayer meetings can be held at any agreed-upon place which is accessible to the group for religious purposes. Very large prayer meetings may be held in convention centers or arenas.

== Purpose ==
Prayer meetings provide social support to those who attend. The prayers during the prayer meeting sometimes ask their deity for a positive outcome in times of uncertainty. The prayer meeting, in a Christian's perspective, is the driving force of the church. It is where the church comes together to find comfort, learn how to be devoted, and seek answers.

In Christianity, prayer meetings can be used to promote "union" and "brotherly love" between attendees. It is aimed at improving the spirituality of attendees in general. A prayer meeting was performed in Acts of the Apostles 2, where the Holy Spirit "enabled" those who attended to speak in different languages. Additionally, prayer meetings assisted the disciples of Jesus while they were being persecuted. In Acts 16, the service performed by Paul the Apostle was an example of a prayer meeting.

In Islam, prayer meetings can be held to recite dhikr, praise Muhammad in prayer, and study Islam. In countries like Indonesia, prayer meetings are held in different places based on class. Lower-class people often meet and pray in mosques, while upper-class people prefer smaller, private sessions. In the modern age, prayer groups are strengthened through online interaction with those inside them. Sufi Islam adherents hold prayer meetings, as they interpret from the passage "remember God often" in the Quran (33, 41) as commanding them to practice Dhikr constantly.

Some prayer meetings are targeted at repentance, either of those attending or of another person or organization which is not in attendance. The latter type of prayer meetings is also a form of protest against the sinful behavior of the targeted person or organization.

In the years before widespread news media, prayer meetings were also a primary source of news and information (including firsthand accounts) about the events leading to the meeting being called. At the same time as the news was received, the prayer meeting offered ways to deal with changing circumstances. This still continues in modern times. However, the impact of such a prayer meeting is now much stronger among the worshipers than among the general public.

== See also ==
- Church (congregation)
- Minyan
