= Gotzman =

Gotzman (Götzmann, Gotzmann, Goetzman) is a German surname. Notable people with this surname include:

- Andreas Gotzmann (born 1960), German historian
- Gary Goetzman (born 1952), American television producer
- Jutta Götzmann (born 1965), German art historian
- Peter Götzmann (born 1957), German drummer
- H. J. Goetzman, early 20th century photographic studio proprietor in Alaska
