= Jewish leadership =

Leadership position

Jewish leadership (Hebrew: מנהיגות יהודית) has evolved over time. Since the destruction of the Second Temple in Jerusalem in 70 CE, there has been no single body that has a leadership position over the entire Jewish diaspora. Various branches of Judaism, as well as Jewish religious or secular communities and political movements around the world elect or appoint their governing bodies, often subdivided by country or region.

== Historic leadership ==
=== Biblical leadership (before 70 CE) ===
During the era of the Tanakh, various forms of leadership developed. There were the heads of the original Hebrew tribes, and then also prophets such as Moses, Jeremiah and Samuel and whose words influence people to this day, judges such as Samson, kings such as David and Solomon, priests of the Temple in Jerusalem, and the Sanhedrin which was the judiciary.

=== Mishnaic, Talmudic, Middle Ages leadership (70 to 17th century) ===
With the demise of ancient kingdoms of Israel and Judah and coinciding with the revolt of the Maccabees against ancient Greece and later Jewish-Roman wars, the sages of the Mishnah and subsequently the Talmud, referred to as the Oral Law in Judaism, took on a growing and central leadership role. After the destruction of the Second Temple and the subsequent exile for almost two thousand years, the Jews scattered throughout the world turned to their most learned rabbis for local leadership and council.

During Bar Kokhba's revolt against Roman Empire (132-136), the supreme religious authority Rabbi Akiva sanctioned Simon bar Kokhba to be a war leader, whereas during the 2nd century Judah haNasi was not only the supreme temporal leader sanctioned by Rome, but also edited the original work of the Mishnah which became the "de facto constitution" of the world's Jewry. The final editions of the Talmud became the core curriculum of the majority of Jews.

In Babylonia the Exilarch was almost always a rabbinical personality. The Geonim such as Saadia Gaon (892-942) were not only great sages but also political guides. The writings and rulings of those such as Rashi (1040–1105), Maimonides (1135–1204), Yosef Karo (1488–1575) who published the most widely accepted code of Jewish law the Shulkhan Arukh, Isaac Luria (1534–1572), the Vilna Gaon (1720–1797), the Chafetz Chaim (1838–1933) and many others have shaped Jewish law for almost two thousand years, as their religious rulings were published, distributed, studied, and observed until the present time.

=== Early modern leadership (18th and 19th centuries) ===
The loose collection of learned rabbis that governed the dispersed Jewish community held sway for a long time. Great parts of Central Europe accepted the leadership of the rabbinical Council of Four Lands from the 16th to the late 18th centuries. In the Eastern Europe, in spite of the rivalry between the schools of thought of the Vilna Gaon (or the GRA, Rabbi Elijah ben Solomon, 1720–1797) of the Mitnagdim, who spoke against Hasidic Judaism and Baal Shem Tov (Rabbi Israel ben Eliezer, 1700–1760), the founder of Hasidic Judaism, rabbis were regarded as the final arbiters of community decisions. Tens of thousands of Responsa and many works were published and studied wherever Jews lived in organized communities. In Western Europe, especially in monarchies, where no equal rights were granted for the Jewish population, radical Maskilim defined the new role of religion as an education of just citizens — like Moses Mendelssohn in his book Jerusalem or On Religious Power and Judaism which was a response to the Prussian reformer Christian Wilhelm von Dohm. The radical tendency of the pedagogic movement went so far, that Mendelssohn's student David Friedländer identified Judaism with the seclusion of modern European culture and secular Judaism could end up in conversion to the religion of the unsecularized state. In contradiction to his teacher early modern leadership turned out to be misled leadership, whose followers ended up as "Jewish citizens without any conscience".

== Modern religious leadership (post–19th century) ==
=== Decline of rabbinic influence ===
With the growth of the Renaissance and the development of the secular modern world, and as Jews were welcomed into non-Jewish society particularly during the times of Napoleon in the 18th and 19th centuries, Jews began to leave the Jewish ghettos in Europe, and simultaneously rejected the traditional roles of the rabbis as communal and religious leaders. New leaders such as Israel Jacobson, father of the German Reform Judaism movement, launched an egalitarian, modernist stance that challenged the Orthodoxy. The resulting fractures in Jewish society has translated into a situation whereby there is no single religious governing body for the entire Jewish community at the present time.

In modern individual religious congregations or synagogues, the spiritual leader is generally the rabbi. Rabbis are expected to be taught in both the Talmud and the Shulkhan Arukh (Code of Jewish Law) as well as many other classical texts of Jewish scholarship. Rabbis go through formal training in Rabbinical texts and responsa, either at a yeshiva or similar institution. "Rabbi" is not a universal term, however, as many Sephardic rabbinic Jewish communities refer to their leaders as Hakham ("wise man"). Among Yemenite Jews, known as Teimanim, the term Mori ("my teacher") is used. Each religious tradition has its own qualifications for rabbis; for more information, see Semicha ("ordination"). Some synagogues also employ a cantor (hazzan or chazzan) to lead the chanting of liturgical prayer. Cantors in the Reform movement have a multi-faceted role. They chant prayers, lead congressional singing, and introduce new melodies, blending ancient and modern music. Cantors in Reform congregations or synagogues are part of the clergy. Music and leading liturgical prayer is their primary role, but they may also lead religious school classes and perform pastoral duties.

=== Orthodox and Haredi rabbinic leadership ===
In Israel the office of Chief Rabbi has always been very influential. Various Orthodox movements, such as Agudath Israel of America and the Shas party in Israel strictly follow the rulings of their Rosh yeshivas who are often famous Talmud scholars. The last Rebbe of Lubavitch, Rabbi Menachem Mendel Schneerson, Rabbi Elazar Menachem Shach, and Rabbi Ovadia Yosef in Israel are examples of powerful contemporary Haredi rabbis. The Haredi Agudah movements receive and follow the policy guidelines of their own Council of Torah Sages. In the Hassidic movements, leadership is usually hereditary.

=== Reform, Progressive, Liberal, Conservative, and Reconstructionist leadership ===
Main articles: Conservative rabbis, Reform rabbis, Reconstructionist rabbis

In both the Reform and Conservative of Judaism, rabbis are often trained at religious universities, such as the Jewish Theological Seminary in New York City for the Conservative movement, Hebrew Union College for the American Reform movement, and Leo Baeck College for the UK Liberal and Reform Movements. The Reform, Conservative, and Reconstructionist traditions each have their own governing group or individual leaders. Membership in these governing groups are selected by representatives of the Jewish community they serve, with Jewish scholarship considered to be the key factors for determining leaders. These governing bodies make decisions on the nature of religious practice within their tradition, as well as ordaining and assigning rabbis and other religious leaders.

The Union of Reform Judaism (URJ), the synagogue arm of the Reform Movement in North America, is governed by a 253-member Board of Trustees in close partnership with URJ Chair Daryl Messinger, URJ President Rabbi Rick Jacobs, and the senior leadership team. Delegates from URJ congregations meet once every two years for the URJ General Assembly to pass resolutions that guide the organization's future direction.

The body of Conservative rabbis is the Rabbinical Assembly, which maintains a Committee on Jewish Law and Standards. The body of Reform rabbis is the Central Conference of American Rabbis.

== Secular leadership ==
Following the Renaissance and the Enlightenment in Europe (with its Jewish "extension" the Haskalah movement, which led to much modern-day assimilation into the cultures of their native countries), the variety of Jewish practice grew, with a widespread adoption of secular values and life-styles. Many modern Jewish communities are served by a variety of secular organizations at the local, national, and international levels. These organizations have no official role in religious life, but often play an important part in the Jewish community. Most of the largest groups, such as Hadassah and the United Jewish Communities, have an elected leadership. No one secular group represents the entire Jewish community, and there is often significant internal debate among Jews about the stances these organizations take on affairs dealing with the Jewish community as a whole, such as antisemitism and Israeli policies.

In the United States and Canada today, the mainly secular United Jewish Communities (UJC), formerly known as the United Jewish Appeal (UJA), represents over 150 Jewish Federations and 400 independent communities across North America. Every major American city has its local "Jewish Federation", and many have sophisticated community centers and provide services, mainly health care-related. They raise record sums of money for philanthropic and humanitarian causes in North America and Israel. Additional local organizations include Jewish Family Services, Jewish nursing homes and Jewish community foundations. Other organizations such as the Anti-Defamation League, American Jewish Congress, American Jewish Committee, and the B'nai B'rith represent different segments of the American Jewish community on a variety of issues.

== Karaite leadership ==
A Karaite synagogue is run by a board of directors, and its spiritual leader is often called a Hakham, the equivalent of a "rabbi", and matches one in function. The Gabbai is the treasurer, the Shammash is the custodian, the Hazzan leads prayers, and in some the Ba'al Qeri'ah leads in the reading of the Torah. In America, Karaites are represented by the Karaite Jews of America.

== See also ==
- Rabbi
  - Chief Rabbi
- Sanhedrin
- Biblical judges
- List of Jewish leaders in the Land of Israel
- Exilarch
- Kohen
- List of 21st-century religious leaders#Judaism
