= Jerusalem (Mendelssohn book) =

Book by Moses Mendelssohn

Jerusalem, or on Religious Power and Judaism
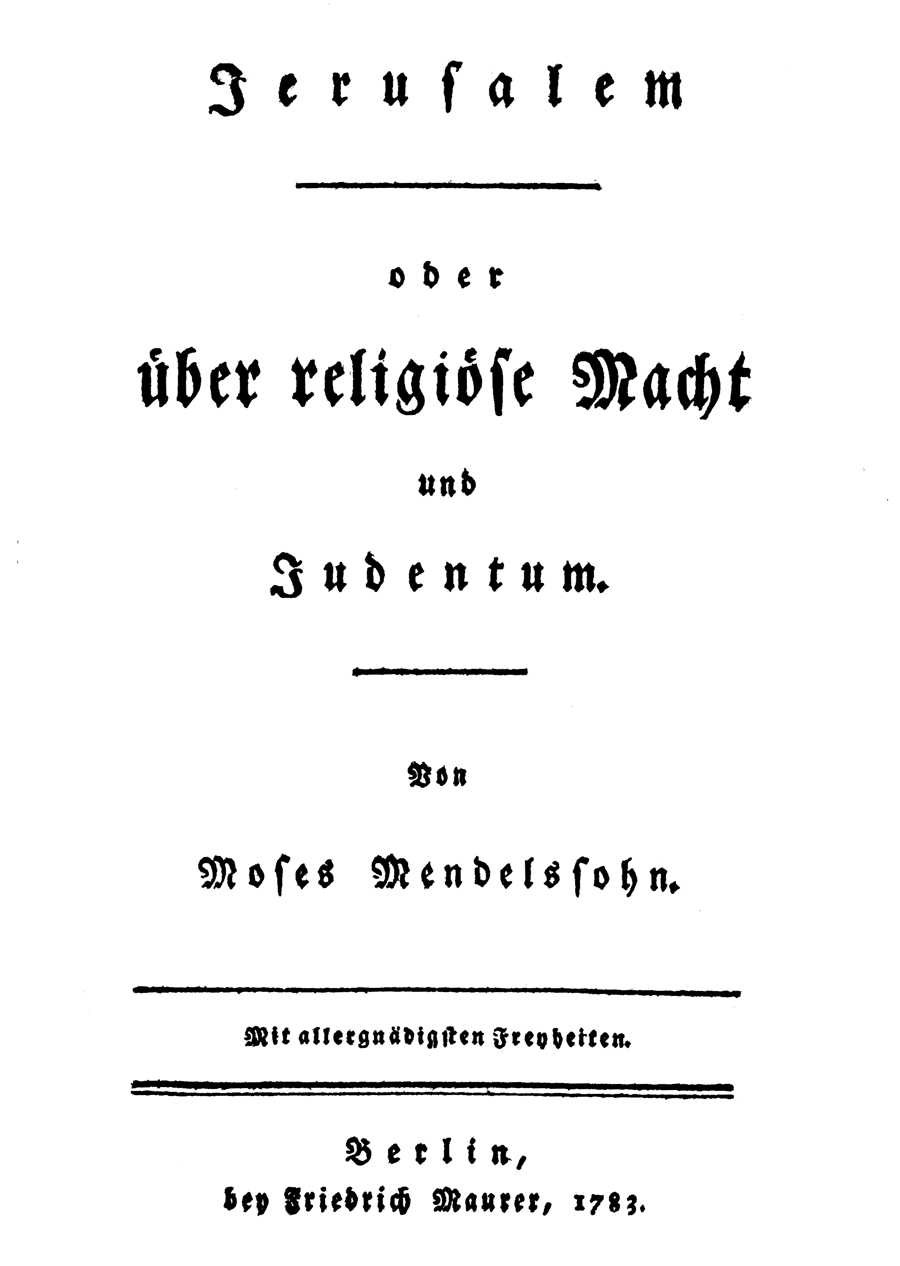
- Title page of the first edition (Berlin: Friedrich Maurer, 1783)
- Author: Moses Mendelssohn
- Publication date: 1783

Jerusalem, or on Religious Power and Judaism (German: Jerusalem oder über religiöse Macht und Judentum) is a book written by Moses Mendelssohn, which was first published in 1783 – the same year when the Prussian officer Christian Wilhelm von Dohm published the second part of his Mémoire Concerning the amelioration of the civil status of the Jews. Moses Mendelssohn was one of the key figures of Jewish Enlightenment (Haskalah) and his philosophical treatise, dealing with social contract and political theory (especially concerning the question of the separation between religion and state), can be regarded as his most important contribution to Haskalah. The book which was written in Prussia on the eve of the French Revolution, consisted of two parts and each one was paginated separately. The first part discusses "religious power" and the freedom of conscience in the context of the political theory (Baruch Spinoza, John Locke, Thomas Hobbes), and the second part discusses Mendelssohn's personal conception of Judaism concerning the new secular role of any religion within an enlightened state. In his publication Moses Mendelssohn combined a defense of the Jewish population against public accusations with contemporary criticism of the present conditions of the Prussian Monarchy.

== Historical background ==
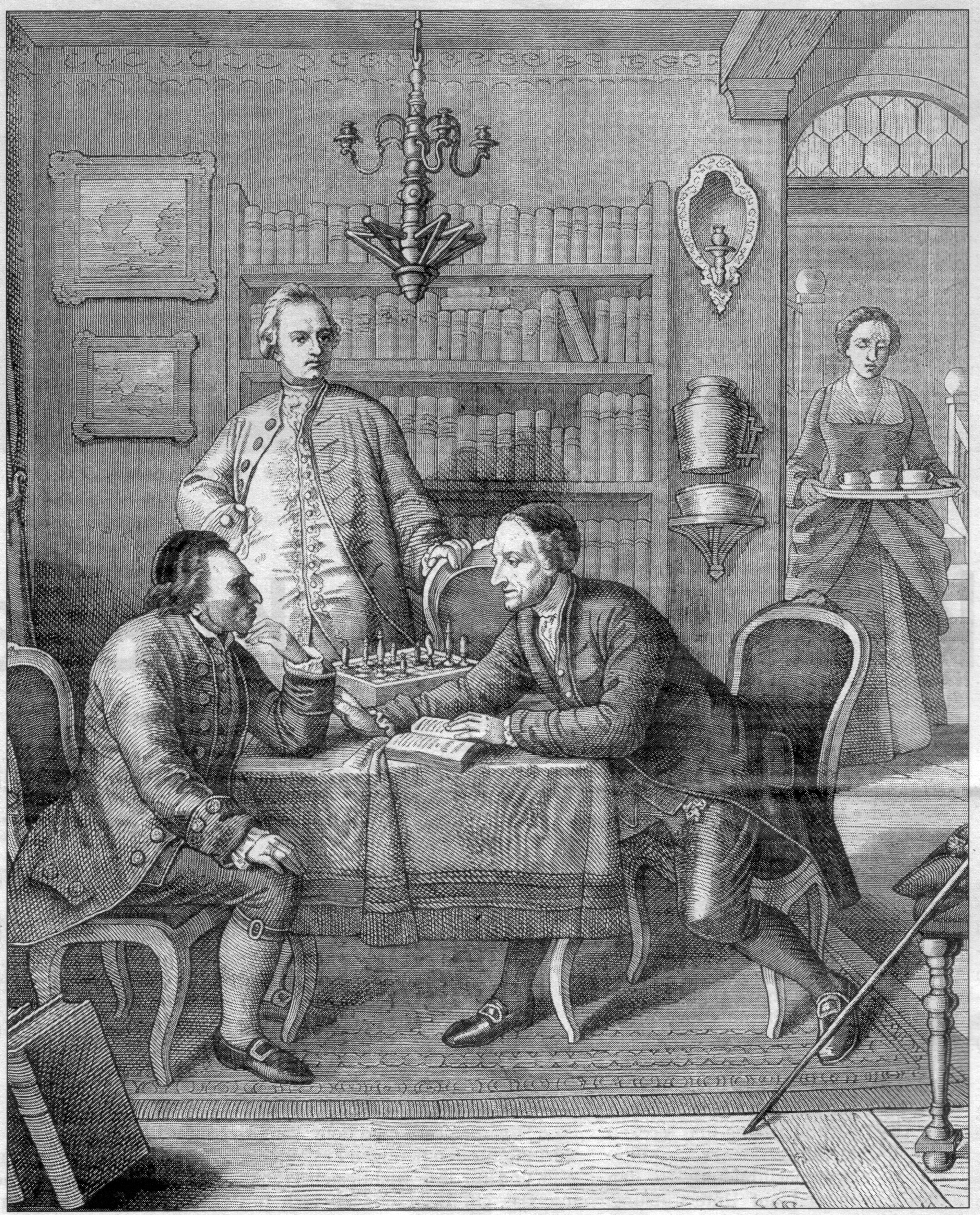
Mendelssohn, Lavater and Lessing (behind), engraving made of a painting by the artist Moritz Daniel Oppenheim (1800–1881)

In 1763 some students of theology visited Moses Mendelssohn in Berlin because of his reputation as a man of letters, and they insisted that they wanted to know Mendelssohn's opinion about Christianity. Three years later one of them, the Swiss Johann Caspar Lavater, sent him his own German translation of Charles Bonnet's Palingénésie philosophique, with a public dedication to Mendelssohn. In this dedication he charged Mendelssohn with the decision to follow Bonnet's reasons by converting to Christianity or to refute Bonnet's arguments. The very ambitious priest Lavater published his dedication to Mendelssohn and Mendelssohn's response together with other letters which were dated to the year 1774—including a prayer of Dr. Kölbele "baptizing two Israelites as a consequence of the Mendelssohn dispute". He abused the reputation of Mendelssohn and of his letters about religious tolerance to fashion himself as a kind of Christian Messiah of contemporary Judaism, disregarding the Haskalah as a conversion to Christianity.

This intrigue was transferred to the times of the medieval Crusades in the allegorical drama Nathan der Weise of Mendelssohn's friend Gotthold Ephraim Lessing: Lessing replaced the young priest Lavater with the historical figure Saladin who appeared as the tolerant hero of the Crusades in the perspective of contemporary enlightened historiography. The motive of Nathan who replied with the ring parable, was taken from Boccaccio's "Decamerone" and Lessing intended to create his drama as a monument of tolerance and enlightenment dedicated to Moses Mendelssohn. Lessing was an open-minded and modern type of freemason and he himself had a public theological dispute (the so-called Fragmentenstreit) about the historical truth of the New Testament with the orthodox Lutheran Hauptpastor Johann Melchior Goeze in Hamburg during the 1770s. Finally he was banned in 1778 by Charles I, Duke of Brunswick-Wolfenbüttel. Lessing's new way to ask about the fundament of a certain religion and to regard its efforts on religious tolerance was intended as a reflection of the current political practice.

In 1782, after the declaration of the so-called "Toleranzpatent" in the Habsburg monarchy under Joseph II and the realization of the «lettres patentes» in the French Monarchy under Louis XVI, religion and especially the Jewish emancipation became a favorite subject of private debates in Alsace–Lorraine and these debates were often followed by publications of Christian clerics and Abbés. Mendelssohn's Jerusalem or on Religious Power and Judaism may be regarded as his contribution to the debate.

During the 1770s, Mendelssohn was frequently asked to act as a mediator by Jews in Switzerland and Alsace – and once Lavater supported Mendelssohn's intervention. About 1780, there was another antisemitic intrigue in Alsace, when François Hell accused the Jewish population of exhausting the peasants. The contemporary Alsatian Jews had no permission to buy land, but they often existed as innkeepers and moneylenders in rural areas. Moses Mendelssohn was asked by Herz Cerfberr, the communal leader of the Alsatian Jews, to react with a Mémoire about the legal discrimination of the Jewish population as it was common practice of the Prussian administration. Moses Mendelssohn arranged a Mémoire by the Prussian officer and freemason Christian Wilhelm von Dohm in which both authors tried to relate the confirmation of the unenlightened condition with a demand for a general improvement of the civil condition.

In this respect Moses Mendelssohn proved in his book Jerusalem which was published in the same year, that the "amelioration" of the civil status of the Jews could not be separated from an urgent need to modernize the Prussian Monarchy as a whole. The reason, why Moses Mendelssohn as one of the most recognized philosophers of Haskalah was from the Kingdom of Prussia, has to be understood by the fact that the state of Jewish emancipation there was on the lowest level in comparison with the neighbour countries. So the Jewish population was more forced to assimilate than in other countries during the 19th century: The Hohenzollern Monarchy followed with their edicts into the footsteps of the Habsburg monarchy—with 10 years delay. In 1784, one year after the publication of Mendelssohn's book Jerusalem, the administration of the Habsburg monarchy prohibited rabbinic jurisdiction and submitted the Jewish population to its own jurisdiction, but with an inferior legal status. This first step of the monarchy was expected to be done in a direction towards intolerance. In 1791 the National Assembly of the French Revolution declared the full civil rights for the Jewish population of the French Republic (Déclaration des droits de l'homme et du citoyen).

== Moses Mendelssohn's treatise "On Religious Power" and its composition ==
Moses Mendelssohn was a highly educated scholar and teacher, who devoted much effort to the German translation of classical Hellenic and Roman philosophers and poets as a young man, and he became a very famous and influential philosopher of Haskalah. His book Jerusalem oder über religiöse Macht und Judentum can be regarded as one of the main works of Jewish Enlightenment. Mendelssohn addressed political authorities directly on the question of religious unity:

Regenten der Erde! [...] Glaubensvereinigung ist nicht Toleranz; ist der wahren Duldung gerade entgegen. Um eurer und unserer Glückseligkeit willen gebt euer vielvermögendes Ansehen nicht her, irgendeine ewige Wahrheit, ohne welche die bürgerliche Glückseligkeit bestehen kann, in ein Gesetz; irgendeine dem Staate gleichgültige Religionsmeinung in Landesverordnung zu verwandeln!

Rulers of the earth! [...] union of faiths is not tolerance, it is directly opposed to true forbearance! For the sake of your happiness and ours, do not lend your mighty influence to transform any eternal truth, without which civil happiness can exist, into law. Do not transform any religious opinion that is indifferent to the state into a national ordinance!

Often this text which explains the real subject of "amelioration" in Dohm's defense, is still underestimated as a contribution to philosophy—probably because it was directly connected with the historical situation and the social conditions of the author's life. On the other hand, a lot of historians concerned about Haskalah criticized the heroic image about Moses Mendelssohn in which he appears as the starting point of Jewish enlightenment without any respect to earlier attempts around the beginning of the 18th century.

Regarding the present accusations and complaints concerning the current state of Judaism as a modern Christian prejudice which just had replaced the medieval ones (like poisoning fountains, ritual slaughtering of Christian children on Pessah etc.), his subject of amelioration was the religion and especially the one which has to be separated from the state.

The two parts of his books have no titles except Erster and Zweiter Abschnitt ("first" and "second section"), and the first one treated clearly the contemporary conflicts of the state and the second those of religion. In the first the author developed his political theory towards a utopia of a just and tolerant democracy, which he identified with the political attempt of the Mosaic Law: therefore the title "Jerusalem". In the second part he worked out a new pedagogic charge which every religion has to fulfill in the private sector. It was reduced to it, because the tolerant state should be separated from any religion. Hence the Mosaic law and the traditional practice of jurisdiction was no longer the business of Judaism, if there would be a tolerant state. Instead the new charge of religion would be the education of just and tolerant citizens. The book as a whole summarizes Moses Mendelssohn's critic concerning the contemporary conditions of the Prussian Monarchy and the legal status of the different religions, which finally means the civil status of its inhabitants according to their faith—the subject of Christian Wilhelm von Dohm's Mémoire.

=== The philosophical issue (first part) ===
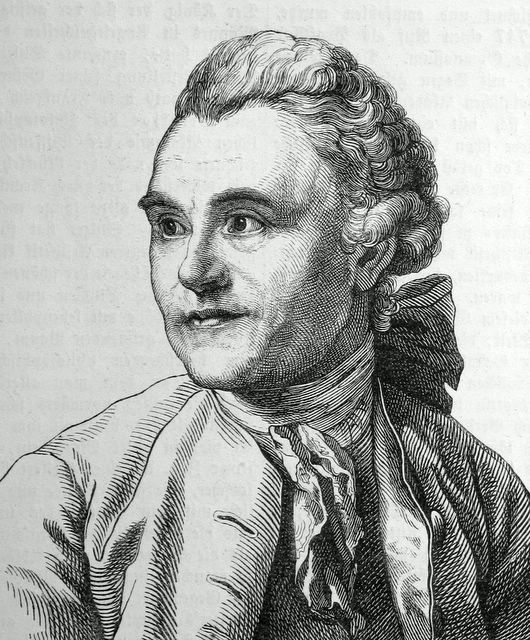
Johann Georg Sulzer

Mendelssohn's concept of political theory has to be understood from the historical situation in Prussian Monarchy and he formulated his theory before Kant. In 1771 he was also chosen by Johann Georg Sulzer, who wanted him as a member of the philosophical department at the Preussische Akademie der Wissenschaften. But Sulzer's call was prohibited by Frederick the Great. The royal intervention clearly showed the borders of enlightenment and tolerance within Prussian monarchy, as far as the separation between religion and state was concerned.

In 1792 Immanuel Kant used in Die Religion innerhalb der Grenzen der blossen Vernunft a conventional theological argument about the inferiority of the Mosaic law which would violently force mankind to a moral attitude, so it could not be really understood as a religion.

==== Despotism (Spinoza and Montesquieu) ====
Moses Mendelssohn opened the first part of his treatise which was published in 1783, with a very similar understanding of religion, but he chose as political example the "Roman Catholic despotism". Although his description of the conflict between state and religion as a conflict between common sense and religion was very close to that of Baruch Spinoza in his Tractatus theologico-politicus, Mendelssohn mentioned Spinoza only briefly, by a comparison of his merits in metaphysics that corresponded to Hobbes' in the field of moral philosophy. Montesquieu's more recent political theory remarked a change in the contemporary situation, when this conflict caused finally the decline of the church and also hopes and fears about the expected end of the ancient régime:

Der Despotismus hat den Vorzug, daß er bündig ist. So lästig seine Forderungen dem gesunden Menschenverstande sind, so sind sie doch unter sich zusammenhängend und systematisch. […] So auch nach römisch-katholischen Grundsätzen die kirchliche Verfassung. […] Räumet ihr alle ihre Forderungen ein; so wisset ihr wenigstens, woran ihr euch zu halten habet. Euer Gebäude ist aufgeführt, und in allen Theilen desselben herrscht vollkommene Ruhe. Freylich nur jene fürchterliche Ruhe, wie Montesquieu sagt, die Abends in einer Festung ist, welche des Nachts mit Sturm übergehen soll. […] So bald aber die Freyheit an diesem systematischen Gebäude etwas zu verrücken wagt, so drohet Zerrüttung von allen Seiten, und man weis am Ende nicht mehr, was davon stehen bleiben kann.

Despotism has the advantage that it is consistent. How inagreeable its demands might be commonsense, they are coherent and systematic. […] As well as the church constitution according to Roman Catholic principles: […] As long as you follow all its demands, you know what to do. Your edifice is founded, and perfect silence reigns in all its parts. Certainly only that terrifying kind of silence, as Montesquieu has objected, that you will find in a fortress, before it will be taken by storm at nightfall. […] But as soon as liberty dares to move something in this edifice, it will threaten disruption everywhere. So at the end you do not know which part of the building will not be ruined.

==== The natural condition of man is intolerance (Thomas Hobbes) ====
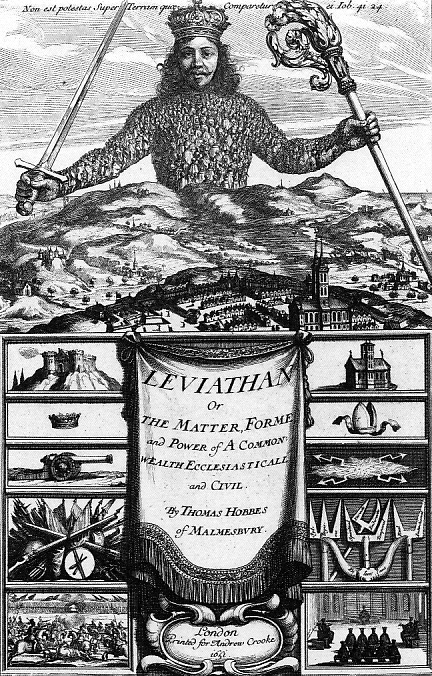
"Non est potestas super terram quae comparatur ei [There is no power ruling the earth which can be compared with His.] Iob 41:24" — The frontispiece of Thomas Hobbes' book Leviathan by Abraham Bosse (London, 1651)

From this libertarian point of view, he drew nearer to Thomas Hobbes' scenario of the "war of all against all" (bellum omnium contra omnes) which Hobbes had described as the "natural condition of mankind" in his book Leviathan:

Stand der Natur sey Stand des allgemeinen Aufruhrs, des Krieges aller wider alle, in welchem jeder mag, was er kann; alles Recht ist, wozu man Macht hat. Dieser unglückselige Zustand habe so lange gedauert, bis die Menschen übereingekommen, ihrem Elende ein Ende zu machen, auf Recht und Macht, in so weit es die öffentliche Sicherheit betrift, Verzicht zu thun, solche einer festgesetzten Obrigkeit in die Hände zu liefern, und nunmehr sey dasjenige Recht, was diese Obrigkeit befielt. Für bürgerliche Freyheit hatte er entweder keinen Sinn, oder wollte sie lieber vernichtet, als so gemißbraucht sehen. […] Alles Recht gründet sich, nach seinem System, auf Macht, und alle Verbindlichkeit auf Furcht; da nun Gott der Obrigkeit an Macht unendlich überlegen ist; so sey auch das Recht Gottes unendlich über das Recht der Obrigkeit erhaben, und die Furcht vor Gott verbinde uns zu Pflichten, die keiner Furcht vor der Obrigkeit weichen dürfen.

[According to Hobbes] the state of nature was the state of a common riot, a war of all against all, in which everyone might do what he could do; in which everything would be right as long as there were only the power to do it. This unfortunate condition lasted until men agreed to finish their misery and to abstain from right and power, as far as public safety was concerned. And they agreed to leave both in the hands of a chosen authority. From now on it was right, what this authority had ordered. He [Thomas Hobbes] either had no sense for civil liberty or he just preferred to see it annihilated rather than have it thus abused. […] According to his system, all right is based on power, and all common sense on fear. Since God in his power is infinitely superior to any [secular] authority, the right of God is also infinitely superior to the right of any authority. And this fear of God commits us to duties, which should never be abandoned for the fear of any [secular] authority.

From this natural human condition, which was banned by a religious fear of God (in Bosse's frontispiece made up by a crowd of people), Mendelssohn defined the role of the state (the left column under the sword) and the role of the religion (the right column under the crook) and the way, how they both had to be brought into harmony:

Der Staat gebietet und zwinget; die Religion belehrt und überredet; der Staat ertheilt Gesetze, die Religion Gebote. Der Staat hat physische Gewalt und bedient sich derselben, wo es nöthig ist; die Macht der Religion ist Liebe und Wohlthun.

The state gives orders and coerces; the religion educates and convinces; the state declares laws, religion offers precepts. The state has physical power and uses it, when it is necessary; the power of religion is charity and beneficience.

But, whatever the religion might be which had to be kept in harmony with the state, the state as a secular authority should never have the right to decide about the faith and the conscience of its citizens.

In Thomas Hobbes' Leviathan the argument that the fear of God also committed the state as an inferior power, was borrowed from a theological tradition which was also very common in Christian Patristic and its reception of the Tanakh. Mendelssohn obviously used Hobbes' moral philosophy to address the present conditions in the French and the Habsburg monarchy and its Roman Catholic constitution, but his main address was probably Prussia and its "philosopher king".

But Mendelssohn's "triumph" over Hobbes did not mean that Hobbes' condition of human nature was not important for his own political theory. Hobbes' impressive justification of a social contract was much more useful for the rhetorical needs of Haskalah than Rousseau's contrat sociale, because his moral philosophy reflected very deeply the consequences of the abuse of political power. And all contemporaries who had another faith than that of state religion, were quite familiar with these consequences.

==== The contract of tolerance (John Locke) ====
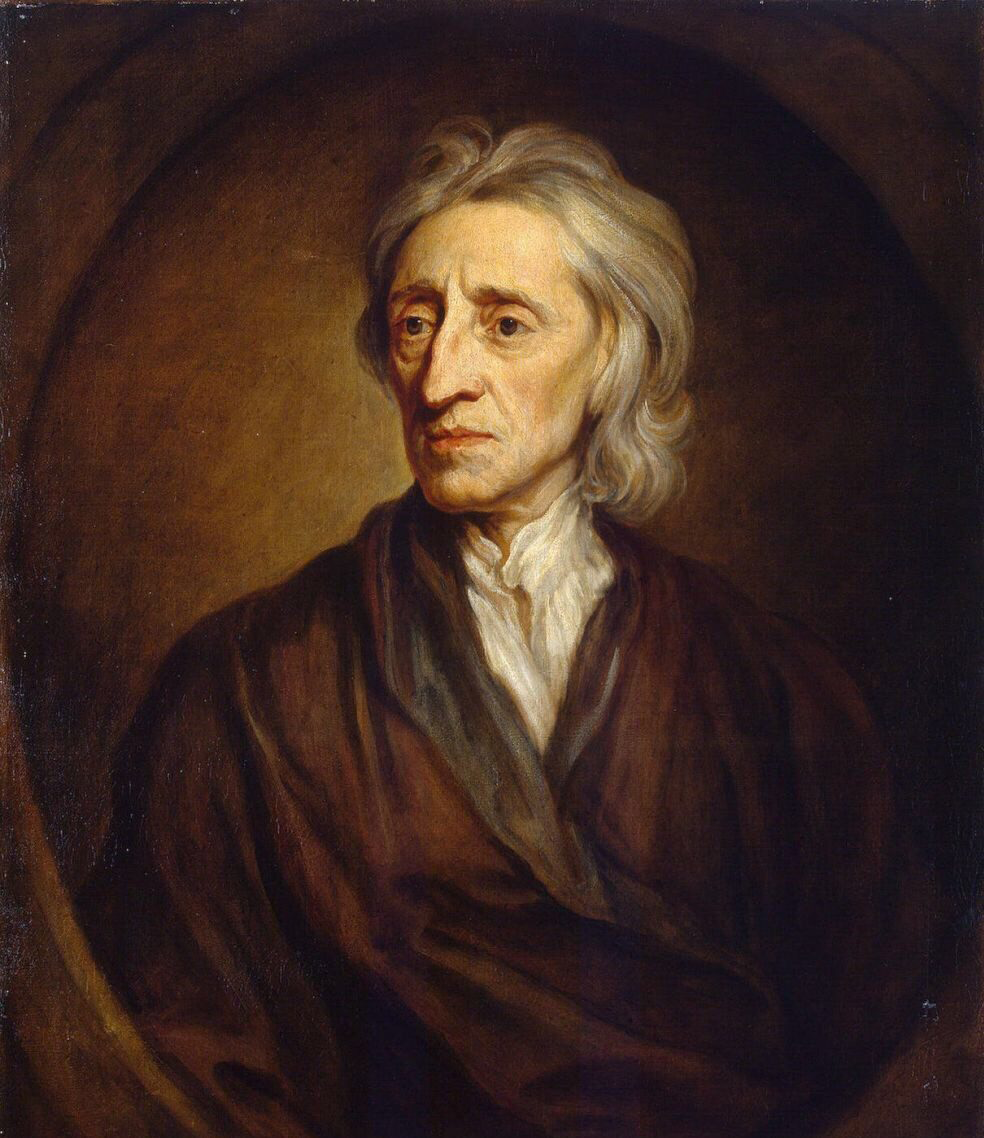
John Locke in a portrait by Sir Godfrey Kneller (1646–1723)

Through the category "freedom of conscience" (Gewissensfreiheit) Mendelssohn turned from the dark side ("war of all against all") to John Locke's enlightened definition of "tolerance" and to his concept of the separation between religion and state:

Locke, der in denselben verwirrungsvollen Zeitläuften lebte, suchte die Gewissensfreyheit auf eine andre Weise zu schirmen. In seinen Briefen über die Toleranz legt er die Definition zum Grunde: Ein Staat sey eine Gesellschaft von Menschen, die sich vereinigen, um ihre zeitliche Wohlfarth gemeinschaftlich zu befördern. Hieraus folgt alsdann ganz natürlich, daß der Staat sich um die Gesinnungen der Bürger, ihre ewige Glückseligkeit betreffend, gar nicht zu bekümmern, sondern jeden zu dulden habe, der sich bürgerlich gut aufführt, das heißt seinen Mitbürgern, in Absicht ihrer zeitlichen Glückseligkeit, nicht hinderlich ist. Der Staat, als Staat, hat auf keine Verschiedenheit der Religionen zu sehen; denn Religion hat an und für sich auf das Zeitliche keinen nothwendigen Einfluß, und stehet blos durch die Willkühr der Menschen mit demselben in Verbindung.

Locke who lived in the same time full of confusion [as Hobbes], looked for another way to protect the freedom of conscience. In his letters on the tolerance he founded his definition as follows: A state should be an association of humans, who agreed to support together their temporal welfare. From this follows quite naturally that the state should not take care of the citizen's attitude concerning their eternal faith, it should rather tolerate everybody who behaves with civil respect — i.e. it should not obstruct its fellow citizens in respect of their temporal faith. The state, as civil authority, had not to observe the divergence; because religion in itself had not necessarily any influence on the temporal, it was just related with it by the arbitrariness of the humans.

Locke's proposed relation between a tolerant state and the humans, who were associated to it as citizens, had to be granted by a social contract. Moses Mendelssohn followed a simple judicial advice, when he described the subject of this contract as "perfect" and "imperfect" "rights" and "responsibilities":

Es giebt vollkommene und unvollkommene, sowohl Pflichten, als Rechte. Jene heißen Zwangsrechte und Zwangspflichten; diese hingegen Ansprüche (Bitten) und Gewissenspflichten. Jene sind äusserlich, diese nur innerlich. Zwangsrechte dürfen mit Gewalt erpreßt; Bitten aber verweigert werden. Unterlassung der Zwangspflichten ist Beleidigung, Ungerechtigkeit; der Gewissenpflichten aber blos Unbilligkeit.

There are perfect and imperfect, as well responsibilities — as rights. The former are called "coercive rights" and "coercive responsibilities" and the latter "requirements" (requests) and "responsibilities of conscience". The former are formal, the latter only inner. It is allowed to enforce coercive rights, but also to refuse requests. The neglect of coercive responsibilities is an insult and an unfairness; but the neglect of responsibilities of the conscience is only an inequity.

According to Mendelssohn's social contract the separation between state and religion was based on the distinction of the "formal" and the "inner" side. Therefore, religion in itself was no "formal" subject of the social contract, only the acts of a citizen had to be judged, as long as they had violated a "formal right" or "responsibility". Despite this separation of the religion from the political theory and its reduction to the private sphere, every religion had its own "inner" power which Mendelssohn described in the second part.

=== The religious issue (second part) ===
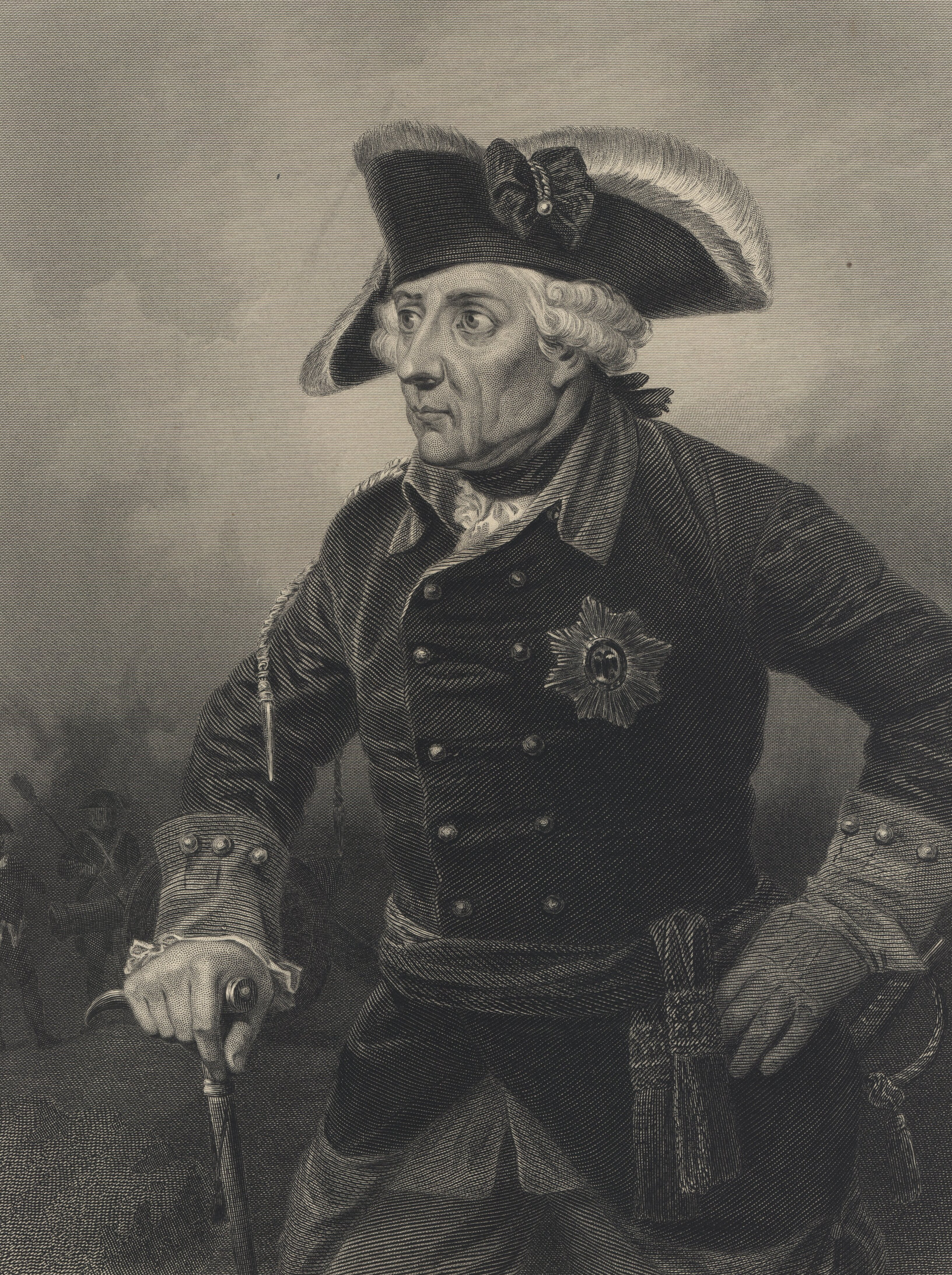
Frederick the Great in an engraving

In his political theory, Moses Mendelssohn had to criticize the present conditions of the Prussian state, and he did without mentioning it, partly for reasons of censorship and partly for rhetorical reasons. This was his polite way to say that its regent was centuries behind his own philosophy:

Ich habe das Glück, in einem Staate zu leben, in welchem diese meine Begriffe weder neu, noch sonderlich auffallend sind. Der weise Regent, von dem er beherrscht wird, hat es, seit Anfang seiner Regierung, beständig sein Augenmerk seyn lassen, die Menschheit in Glaubenssachen, in ihr volles Recht einzusetzen. […] Mit weiser Mäßigung hat er zwar die Vorrechte der äußern Religion geschont, in deren Besitz er sie gefunden. Noch gehören vielleicht Jahrhunderte von Cultur und Vorbereitung dazu, bevor die Menschen begreifen werden, daß Vorrechte um der Religion willen weder rechtlich, noch im Grunde nützlich seyen, und daß es also eine wahre Wohlthat seyn würde, allen bürgerlichen Unterschied um der Religion willen schlechterdings aufzuheben. Indessen hat sich die Nation unter der Regierung dieses Weisen so sehr an Duldung und Vertragsamkeit in Glaubenssachen gewöhnt, daß Zwang, Bann und Ausschließungsrecht wenigstens aufgehört haben, populäre Begriffe zu seyn.

I have the fortune to live in a state in which my opinions are neither new nor very extraordinary. Its wise regent who rules it, paid always, since the beginning of his reign, attention, that mankind gets its full right concerning all affairs of faith [literally: believe, confession]. […] With wise moderateness he preserved the privilege of the formal religion as he had found it. There are still centuries of civilization and preparation before us, when man will finally understand that privileges of a certain religion are neither based on law nor on the religion's own fundament, so that it will be a real benefit to abolish simply any civil divergence in favour of one religion. However under the rule of this Wise the nation got so accustomed to tolerance and compatibility in respect to other religions, that at least force, bann and the right to exclude are no longer popular terms.

In consequence, the second part on religious power had to criticize the present conditions of that religion which he always had to defend during his life. For these critics he needed the idea that state and religion should be divided, but kept in harmony, as well as the utopic postulation of a just state which should be the political target of a religious community. After this preparation, the finding of the preconditions in his political theory (the key or better: the ring in his whole argumentation), the first step was to comment the misconceived points of view: the adaptation to despotism, as it was postulated by many Christians discussing the "amelioration of the Jews".

==== Falling to the upper floor (Lavater and Cranz) ====
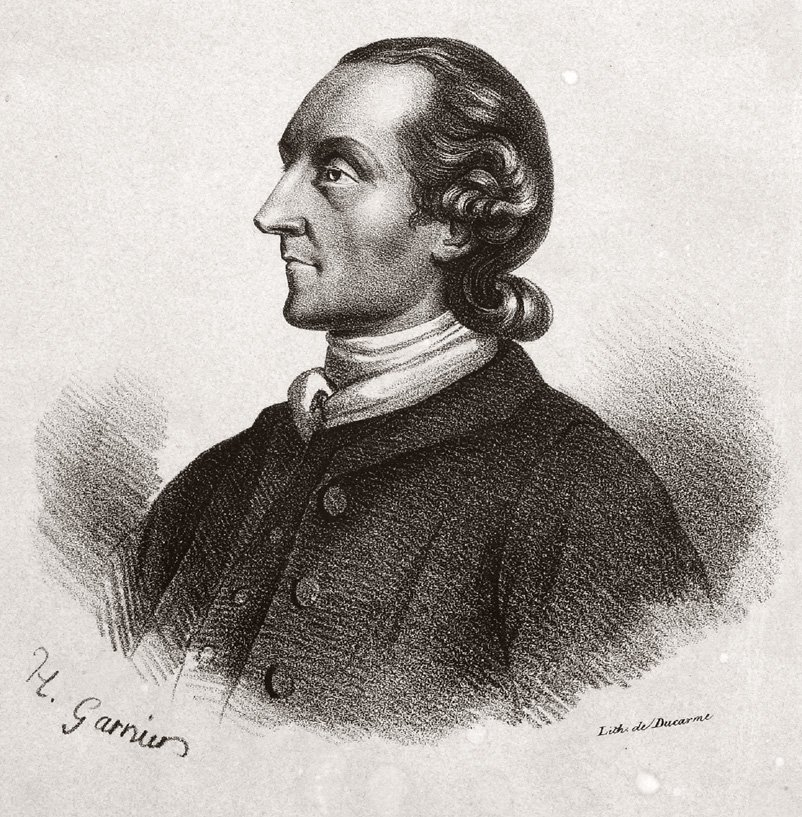
The priest Johann Caspar Lavater

Therefore, Moses Mendelssohn refers to his older arguments which he used in his dispute with Lavater – and more recently in response to an anonymous recension of Mendelssohn's introduction to Menassah Ben Israel's Vindication of the Jews. With the medieval metaphor of masonry for the art of memory (often represented allegorically as "prudence") and its reference to religious education as a moral and sentimental education, he tried to turn back Lavater's projection. While Christians like to regard the crisis of Judaism, Mendelssohn regards the present situation – in the eve of the French Revolution – as a general crisis of religion:

Wenn es wahr ist, daß die Ecksteine meines Hauses austreten, und das Gebäude einzustürzen drohet, ist es wohlgethan, wenn ich meine Habseligkeit aus dem untersten Stokwerke in das oberste rette? Bin ich da sicherer? Nun ist das Christentum, wie Sie wissen, auf dem Judentume gebauet, und muß nothwendig, wenn dieses fällt, mit ihm über einen Hauffen stürzen.

If it is true, that the cornerstones of my house had become so weak, that the building might tumble down, shall I follow the advice to save my goods from the ground to the upper floor? Will I be safer there? As you know, Christianity is built upon Judaism and so, if the latter tumbles, the former will necessarily fall over it in one heap of rubble.

Mendelssohn's house metaphor from the beginning of the first part reappears at the beginning of the second part. Here he used it to reflect the historical fact that Christianity never developed its own ethics independent from the Ten Commandments, which are still part of the canonic redaction of the Christian Bible.

Lavater serves here as a more or less moderate example of the hypocritic religious man, whose religion is the favoured and the dominating one within the political system. Like in Hobbes' scenario he likes, what the system allows him to do – at least in this case: forcing another citizen to convert to the dominating religion.

==== Jews as equal citizens and the crisis of Judaism (the reform of Haskalah) ====
But this hypocrisy reflects once more the radicalism of Moses Mendelssohn's contract of tolerance: If the religion's business has to be reduced to the "inner side" and religion itself cannot be the formal subject of this contract, it simply means that state affairs like executive, legislature and judiciary will be no longer religious affairs. Nevertheless, he was denying the contemporary practice of rabbinic jurisdiction, which was hardly acceptable for a lot of orthodox Jews. And one year after the publication of his book the denial of rabbinic jurisdiction became political practice in the Habsburg monarchy, when a state edict, added to the "tolerance patent", submitted Jewish subjects to its own law court without regarding them on an equal footing with Christian subjects.

Moses Mendelssohn is supposed to be the first Maskilim of his time who denied the present conditions and the rabbinic practice attached to it. This condition was that each Jewish community had its own jurisdiction and that the coexistence of several communities often corrected judges. His proposition must not only regarded as very modern, it turned out to be substantial during the discussions of the French Legislative Assembly concerning the Jewish emancipation during the 1790s. In these debates Judaism was often supposed to be an "own nation within the nation" and the Jewish representatives had to abandon this former status, so that the Jewish population will gain the new status as equal citizens and that they will participate in the new law of the French constitution.

In his pragmatism Mendelssohn had to convince the Jewish population that they have to abandon the tradition of rabbinic jurisdiction, but in the same time they have no reason to feel inferior, because some Christians believe that the moral conditions of Jewish tradition has to be regarded as inferior to their theological concept of absolution.

It was up to the Christians to find the way back to their fundament, which was the Mosaic law. But it was up to the Jews to face the present situation, in which Jewish communities were abandoned by a wealthy and privileged minority, so that poverty was increasing rapidly – especially in the town ghettos. In his philosophy Moses Mendelssohn reacted to the change from medieval conditions among the communities, when an elite between rich and rabbinic families was ruling the community. New privileges were granted by the Prussian state to rich members of the community, so that they finally left the community by conversion. But Mendelssohn regarded beneficence less as a "coerce responsibility" than as a voluntary act of wealthy members.

==== The ring (Lessing and deism) ====
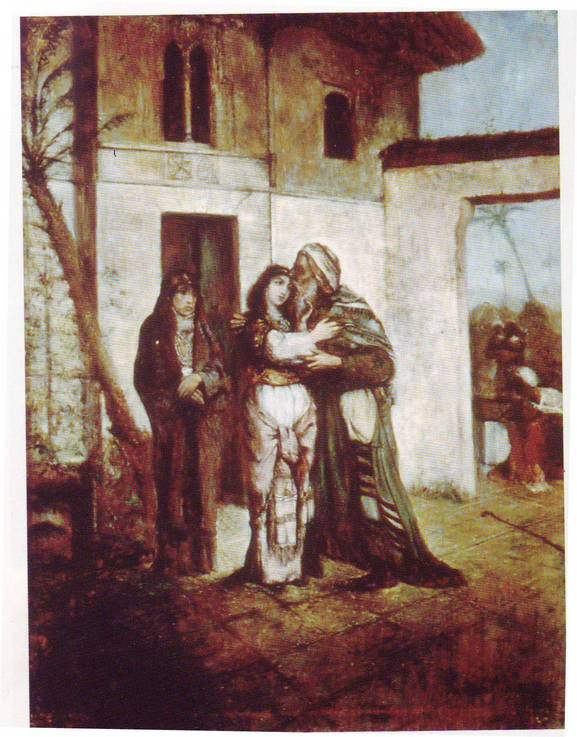
Daja, Recha und Nathan in Lessing's play Nathan der Weise — painting by Maurycy Gottlieb (1877)

Moses Mendelssohn created a syncretism which combined contemporary humanistic idealism and its deistic concept of a natural religion based on rational principles with the living tradition of Ashkenasic Judaism. His adoration of the Mosaic law should not be misunderstood as a kind of historical criticism, it was based on an own politically motivated interpretation of the Torah as a divine revelation which was offered to the prophet Moses, so that he will save Judaism from its materialistic decline, symbolized in worshipping the golden calf and idolatry, by the divine law.

For Moses Mendelssohn the Mosaic law was "divine", as long as the community following its principles would be just. The attribute "divine" was simply given by the law's function to create a just social fabric: the social contract in itself. The eternal truth of the law was bound to this function, and it was so less achievable, that any judgement of a rabbi had to be judged according to Salomonic Wisdom. Mendelssohn referred to an anecdote of the Hillel school of Mishnah which has in itself an own theological formulation of the categorical imperative as Kant would later call it on:

Ein Heide sprach: Rabbi, lehret mich das ganze Gesetz, indem ich auf einem Fuße stehe! Samai, an dem er diese Zumuthung vorher ergehen ließ, hatte ihn mit Verachtung abgewiesen; allein der durch seine unüberwindliche Gelassenheit und Sanftmuth berühmte Hillel sprach: Sohn! liebe deinen Nächsten wie dich selbst. Dieses ist der Text des Gesetzes; alles übrige ist Kommentar. Nun gehe hin und lerne!

A goy said: "Rabbi, teach me the whole law, on which I stand with one foot!" Shammai to whom he addressed before with the same impertinence, disregardfully refused him. But Hillel who was famous for his insuperable serenity and mildness, replied: "Son! love thy neighbour as thyself. [Leviticus 19:18] This is the text of the law, the rest is commentary. Now go and learn!"

With this biblical proverb, often quoted in the New Testament including the beatitudes, Mendelssohn returned to the deistic adoration of the Mosaic law as the Jewish-Christian contribution to universal ethics:

Diese Verfassung ist ein einziges Mal da gewesen: nennet sie die mosaische Verfassung, bey ihrem Einzelnamen. Sie ist verschwunden, und ist dem Allwissenden allein bekannt, bey welchem Volke und in welchem Jahrhunderte sich etwas Aehnliches wieder wird sehen lassen.

The constitution had been here only once: you may call it the mosaic Constitution, which was its name. It has disappeared, and only the Almighty knows, in which nation and in which century something similar will appear again.

"Mosaic Constitution" was just the Jewish name of the democratic constitution, as it was called by their ancestors. And probably some Jews were waiting for it like for a Messiah who would once unban them from feudal slavery.

The argument through which he inspired Lessing in his drama Nathan der Weise, was the following: Each religion has not to be judged in itself, but only the acts of a citizen who keeps faith with it, according to a just law. This kind of law constitutes a just state, in which the people of different faith may live together in peace.

According to his philosophy the new charge of any religion in general was not jurisdiction, but education as a necessary preparation to become a just citizen. Mendelssohn's point of view was that of a teacher who translated a lot of classical rabbinic authors like Maimonides from Hebrew into German, so that a Jewish child would be attracted to learn German and Hebrew in the same time.

==== Moses Mendelssohn's estimation of the civil conditions (1783) ====
At the end of his book Mendelssohn returns to the real political conditions in Habsburg, French and Prussian Monarchy, because he was often asked to support Jewish communities in their territories. In fact none of these political systems were offering the tolerant conditions, so that every subject should have the same legal status regardless to his or her religious faith. (In his philosophy Mendelssohn discussed the discrimination of the individuum according to its religion, but not according to its gender.) On the other hand, a modern education which Mendelssohn regarded still as a religious affair, required a reformation of the religious communities and especially their organization of the education which has to be modernized.

As long as the state did not follow John Locke's requirement concerning the "freedom of conscience", any trial of an ethic education would be useless at all and every subject would be forced to live in separation according to their religious faith. Reflecting the present conditions Mendelssohn addresses – directly in the second person – to the political authorities:

Ihr solltet glauben, uns nicht brüderlich wieder lieben, euch mit uns nicht bürgerlich vereinigen zu können, so lange wir uns durch das Zeremonialgesetz äusserlich unterscheiden, nicht mit euch essen, nicht von euch heurathen, das, so viel wir einsehen können, der Stifter eurer Religion selbst weder gethan, noch uns erlaubt haben würde? — Wenn dieses, wie wir von christlich gesinnten Männern nicht vermuthen können, eure wahre Gesinnung seyn und bleiben sollte; wenn die bürgerliche Vereinigung unter keiner andern Bedingung zu erhalten, als wenn wir von dem Gesetze abweichen, das wir für uns noch für verbindlich halten; so thut es uns herzlich leid, was wir zu erklären für nöthig erachten: so müssen wir auf bürgerliche Vereinigung Verzicht thun; so mag der Menschenfreund Dohm vergebens geschrieben haben, und alles in dem leidlichen Zustande bleiben, in welchem es itzt ist, in welchem es eure Menschenliebe zu versetzen, für gut findet. […] Von dem Gesetze können wir mit gutem Gewissen nicht weichen, und was nützen euch Mitbürger ohne Gewissen?

You should think, that you are not allowed to return our brotherly love, to unite with us as equal citizens, as long as there is any formal divergence in our religious rite, so that we do not eat together with you and do not marry one of yours, which the founder of your religion, as far as we can see, neither would have done, nor would have allowed us? — If this has to be and to remain your real opinion, as we may not expect of men following the Christian ethos; if a civil unification is only available on the condition that we differ from the law which we are already considering as binding, then we have to announce – with deep regret – that we do better to abstain from the civil unification; then the philanthropist Dohm has probably written in vain and everything will remain on the awkward condition – as it is now and as your charity has chosen it. […] We cannot differ from the law with a clear conscience and what will be your use of citizens without conscience?

In this paragraph it becomes very evident, that Moses Mendelssohn did not foresee the willingness of some Jewish men and women who left some years later their communities, because they do not want to suffer from a lower legal status any longer.

== History of reception ==
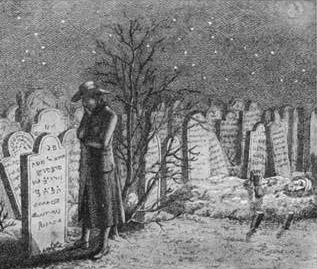
Tombstone of Moses Mendelssohn in a drawing by Daniel Chodowiecki (1726–1801)

Moses Mendelssohn risked a lot, when he published this book, not only in front of the Prussian authority, but also in front of religious authorities – including Orthodox Rabbis. The following years some of his famous Christian friends stroke him at his very sensible side: his adoration for Lessing who died 1781 and could not defend his friend as he always had done during his lifetime.

=== Mendelssohn and Spinoza in the Pantheism Controversy ===
The strike was done by Lavater's friend Friedrich Heinrich Jacobi who published an episode between himself and Lessing, in which Lessing confessed to be a "Spinozist", while reading Goethe's Sturm und Drang poem Prometheus. "Spinozism" became quite fashionable that time and was a rather superficial reception, which was not so much based on a solid knowledge of Spinoza's philosophy than on the "secret letters" about Spinoza. These letters circulated since Spinoza's lifetime in the monarchies, where Spinoza's own writings were on the index of the Catholic Inquisition, and often they regarded Spinoza's philosophy as "atheistic" or even as a revelation of the secrets of Kabbalah mysticism. The German Spinoza fashion of the 1780s was more a "pantheistic" reception which gained the attraction of rebellious "atheism", while its followers are returning to a romantic concept of religion. Jacobi was following a new form of German idealism and later joined the romanticist circle around Fichte in Jena. Later, 1819 during the hep hep riots or pogroms, this new form of idealism turned out to be very intolerant, especially in the reception of Jakob Fries.

The fashion pantheism did not correspond to Mendelssohn's deistic reception of Spinoza and Lessing whose collected works he was publishing. He was not so wrong, because Spinoza himself developed a fully rational form of deism in his main work Ethica, without any knowledge of the later pantheistic reception of his philosophy. Mendelssohn published in his last years his own attitude to Spinoza – not without his misunderstandings, because he was frightened to lose his authority which he still had among rabbis. On his own favor Goethe fashioned himself as a "revolutionary" in his Dichtung und Wahrheit, while he was very angry with Jacobi because he feared the consequences of the latter's publication using Goethe's poem. This episode caused a reception in which Moses Mendelssohn as a historical protagonist and his philosophy is underestimated.

Nevertheless, Moses Mendelssohn had a great influence on other Maskilim and on the Jewish emancipation, and on nearly every philosopher discussing the role of the religion within the state in 19th century Western Europe.

=== The French Revolution and the early Haskalah reform of education ===
The philanthropist and reformer Israel Jacobson in a contemporary drawing

Mendelssohn's dreams about a tolerant state became reality in the new French Constitution of 1791. Berr Isaac Berr, the Ashkenazic representative in the Legislative Assembly, praised the French republic as the "Messiah of modern Judaism", because he had to convince French communities for the new plans of a Jewish reform movement to abandon their autonomy. The French version of Haskalah, called régénération, was more moderate than the Jewish reform movement in Prussia.

While better conditions were provided by the constitution of the French Republic, the conflict between Orthodox Rabbis and wealthy and intellectual laymen of the reform movement became evident with the radical initiatives by Mendelssohn's friend and student David Friedländer in Prussia. He was the first who followed Mendelssohn's postulations in education, since he founded 1776 together with Isaak Daniel Itzig the Jüdische Freischule für mittellose Berliner Kinder ("Jewish Free School for Impecunious Children in Berlin") and 1778 the Chevrat Chinuch Ne'arim ("Society for the Education of Youth"). His 1787 attempt of a German translation of the Hebrew prayerbook Sefer ha-Nefesh ("Book of the Soul") which he did for the school, finally became not popular as a ritual reform, because 1799 he went so far to offer his community a "dry baptism" as an affiliation by the Lutheran church. There was a seduction of free-thinking Jews to identify the seclusion from European modern culture with Judaism in itself and it could end up in baptism. As Heinrich Heine commented it, some tend to reduce Judaism to a "calamity" and to buy with a conversion to Christianity an "entré billet" for the higher society of the Prussian state. By the end of the 18th century there were a lot of contemporary concepts of enlightenment in different parts of Europe, in which humanism and a secularized state were thought to replace religion at all.

Israel Jacobson, himself a merchant, but also an engaged pedagogue in charge of a land rabbi in Westphalia, was much more successful than David Friedländer. Like Moses Mendelssohn he regarded education as a religious affair. One reason for his success was the political fact, that Westphalia became part of France. Jacobson was supported by the new government, when he founded in 1801 a boys' school for trade and elementary knowledge in Seesen (a small town near Harz), called "Institut für arme Juden-Kinder". The language used during the lessons was German. His concept of pedagogy combined the ideas of Moses Mendelssohn with those of the socially engaged Philantropin school which Basedow founded in Dessau, inspired by Rousseau's ideas about education. 1805 also poor Christian boys were allowed to attend the school and it became one of the first schools, which coeducated children of different faith. Since 1810 religious ceremonies were also held in the first Reform Temple, established on the school's ground and equipped by an organ. Before 1810 the Jewish community of the town had their celebrations just in a prayer room of the school. Since 1810 Mendelssohn needed the instrument to accompany German and Hebrew songs, sung by the pupils or by the community in the "Jacobstempel". He adapted these prayers himself to tunes, taken from famous Protestant chorales. In the charge of a rabbi he read the whole service in German according to the ideas of the reformed Protestant rite, and he refused the "medieval" free rhythmic style of chazzan, as it was common use in the other Synagogues. 1811 Israel Jacobson introduced a "confirmation" ceremony of Jewish boys and girls as part of his reformed rite.

=== Conflicts in Prussia after the Viennese Congress ===
Since Westphalia came under Prussian rule according to the Congress of Vienna 1815, the Jacobson family settled to Berlin, where Israel opened a Temple in his own house. The orthodox community of Berlin asked the Prussian authorities to intervene and so his third "Jacobstempel" was closed. Prussian officers argued, that the law allows only one house of Jewish worship in Berlin. In consequence a reformed service was celebrated as minyan in the house of Jacob Herz Beer. The chant was composed by his son who later became a famous opera composer under the name Giacomo Meyerbeer. In opposition to Israel's radical refuse of the traditional Synagogue chant, Meyerbeer reintegrated the chazzan and the recitation of Pentateuch and Prophets into the reformed rite, so that it became more popular within the community of Berlin.

Johann Gottfried Herder's appreciation of the Mosaic Ethics was influenced by Mendelssohn's book Jerusalem as well as by personal exchange with him. It seems that in the tradition of Christian deistic enlightenment the Torah was recognized as an important contribution to the Jewish-Christian civilization, though contemporary Judaism was often compared to the decadent situation, when Aaron created the golden calf (described in Exodus 32), so enlightenment itself was fashioning itself with the archetypical role of Moses. But the contemporary Jewish population was characterized by Herder as a strange Asiatic and selfish "nation" which was always separated from others, not a very original conception which was also popular in the discussions of the National Assembly which insisted that Jewish citizens have to give up their status as a nation, if they want to join the new status as equal citizens.

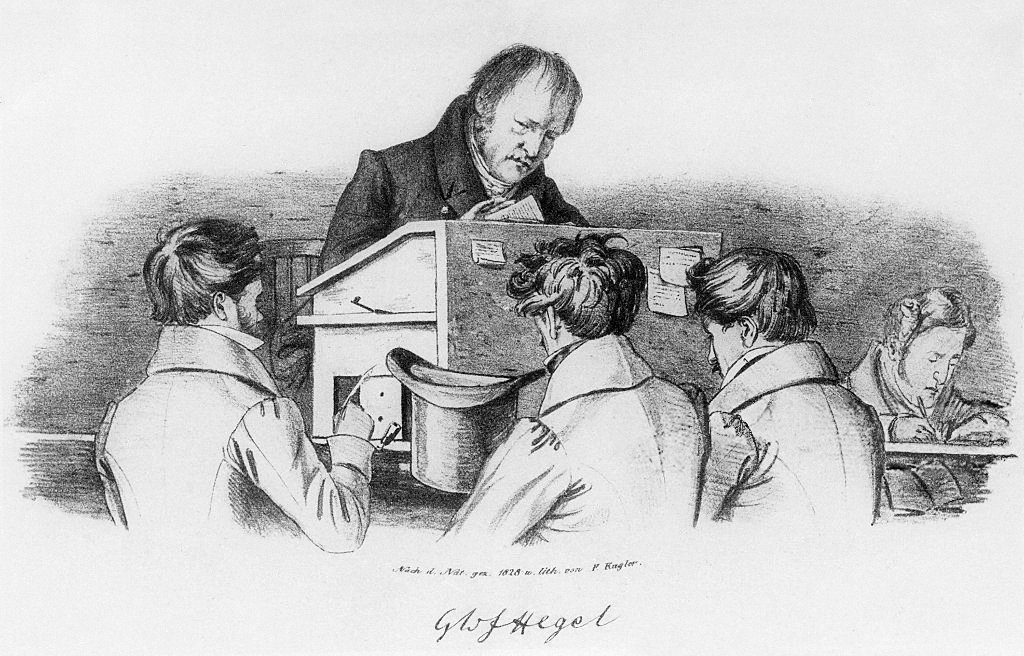
Hegel in a drawing by one of his students

Georg Wilhelm Friedrich Hegel whose philosophy was somehow inspired by a "Mosaic" mission, was not only an important professor at the University in Berlin since 1818, he also had a positive influence on reform politics of Prussia. Though his missionary ambitions and his ideas about a general progress in humanity which can be found in his philosophy, Hegel was often described by various of his students as a very open minded and warm hearted person who was always ready to discuss controversially his ideas and the ideas opposed to it. He was probably the professor in Prussia who had the most Jewish students, among them very famous ones like Heinrich Heine and Ludwig Börne, and also reform pedagogues like Nachman Krochmal from Galicia.

When Hegel was still in Heidelberg, he was accusing his colleague Jakob Fries, himself a student of Fichte, for his superstitious ideas concerning a German nation and he disregarded his antisemitic activities as a mentor of the Burschenschaft which organized the Wartburgfest, the murder of August von Kotzebue and the hep hep riots. In 1819 he went with his students to the hep hep riot in Heidelberg and they were standing with raised arms before the people who lived in the poverty of the Jewish ghetto, when the violent mob was arriving. As result he asked his student Friedrich Wilhelm Carové to found the first student association which also allows access for Jewish students, and finally Eduard Gans founded in November the Verein für Kultur und Wissenschaft der Juden [Society for Culture and Science of the Jews] on the perspective that the ideas of enlightenment must be replaced by a synthesis of European Jewish and Christian traditions. This perspective followed some fundamental ideas which Hegel developed in his dialectic philosophy of history, and it was connected with hopes that finally an enlightened state will secularize religious traditions and fulfill their responsibility. In some respect this synthesis was expected as a kind of revolution, though an identification with the demagogues was not possible—as Heinrich Heine said in a letter 1823:

Obschon ich aber in England ein Radikaler und in Italien ein Carbonari bin, so gehöre ich doch nicht zu den Demagogen in Deutschland; aus dem ganz zufälligen und g[e]ringfügigen Grunde, daß bey einem Siege dieser letztern einige tausend jüdische Hälse, und just die besten, abgeschnitten werden.

Even though I am a Radical in Britain and a Carbonari in Italy, I do certainly not belong to the demagogues in Germany—just for the very simple reason that in case of the latter's victory some thousand Jewish throats will be cut—the best ones first.

In the last two years Prussia passed many restrictive laws which excluded Jews from military and academic offices and as members of parliament. The expectation that the Prussian state will once follow the reasons of Hegel's Weltgeist, failed, instead it was turning backwards and the restrictions increased up to 1841, whereas the officer Dohm expected a participation as equal citizens for 1840. Moses Mendelssohn who was regarded as a Jewish Luther by Heinrich Heine, made several predictions of the future in Jerusalem. The worst of them became true, and finally a lot of Jewish citizens differed from the law and became what Mendelssohn called "citizens without conscience". Because there was no "freedom of conscience" in Prussia, Heinrich Heine left the Verein without any degree in law and finally—like Eduard Gans himself—converted to the Lutheran church 1825.

=== Moses Mendelssohn's Jerusalem and the rise of revolutionary antisemitism ===
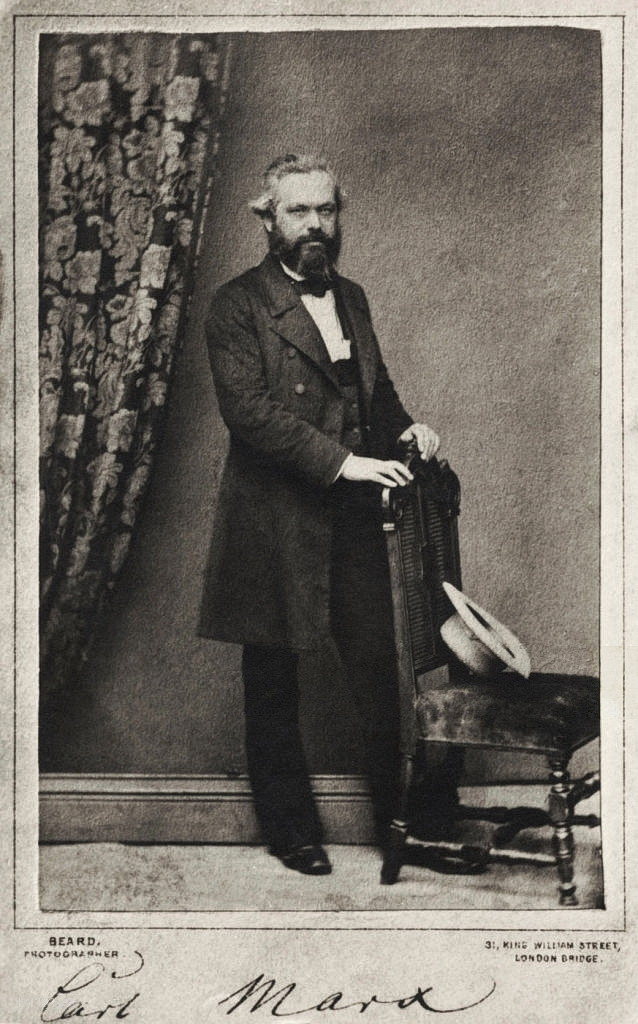
Karl Marx in 1861

Karl Marx was not a direct student of Hegel, but Hegel's philosophy, whose lectures were also frequented by Prussian officers, was still very present after his death in 1831 as well among conservatives as among radicals who were very disappointed about the present conditions and the failed reform of the state. 1835, when Karl inscribed as a student, Hegel's book Leben Jesu was published posthumously and its reception was divided into the so-called Right or Old and the Left or Young Hegelians around Bruno Bauer and Ludwig Feuerbach. Karl had grown up in a family which were related to the traditional rabbinic family Levi through his mother. Because the Rhine province became part of the French Republic, where the full civil rights were granted by the Constitution, Marx's father could work as a lawyer (Justizrat) without being discriminated for his faith. This changed, when the Rhine province became part of Prussia after the Congress of Vienna. In 1817 Heinrich Marx felt forced to convert to the Lutheran church, so that he could save the existence of his family continuing his profession. In 1824 his son was baptized, when he was six years old.

The occasion that the Jewish question was debated again, was the 7th Landtag of the Rhine province 1843. The discussion was about an 1839 law which tried to withdraw the Hardenberg edict from 1812. 1839 it was refused by the Staatsrat, 1841 it was published again to see what the public reactions would be. The debate was opened between Ludwig Philippson (Allgemeine Zeitung des Judentums) and Carl Hermes (Kölnische Zeitung). Karl Marx was thinking to join the debate with an own answer of the Jewish question, but he left it to Bruno Bauer. His later answer was mainly a reception of Bauer's argument. Marx's and Bauer's polemic style was probably influenced by Heinrich Heine's Damascus letters (Lutetia Teil 1, 1840) in which Heine was calling James Mayer de Rothschild a "revolutionary" and in which he used phrases such as:

Bey den französischen Juden, wie bey den übrigen Franzosen, ist das Gold der Gott des Tages und die Industrie ist die herrschende Religion.

For French Jews as well for all the other French gold is the God of the day and industry the dominating religion!

Whereas Hegel's idea of a humanistic secularization of religious values was deeply rooted in the idealistic emancipation debates around Mendelssohn in which a liberal and tolerant state has to be created on the fundament of a modern (religious) education, the only force of modernization according to Marx was capitalism, the erosion of traditional values, after they had turned into material values. The difference between the ancien régime and Rothschild, chosen as a representative of a successful minority of the Jewish population, was that they had nothing to lose, especially not in Prussia where this minority finally tended to convert to Christianity. But since the late 18th century the Prussian Jews were merely reduced to their material value, at least from the administrative perspective of the Prussian Monarchy.

Marx's answer to Mendelssohn's question: "What will be your use of citizens without conscience?" was simply that: The use was now defined as a material value which could be expressed as a sum of money, and the Prussian state like any other monarchy finally did not care about anything else.

Der Monotheismus des Juden ist daher in der Wirklichkeit der Polytheismus der vielen Bedürfnisse, ein Polytheismus, der auch den Abtritt zu einem Gegenstand des göttlichen Gesetzes macht. Das praktische Bedürfniß, der Egoismus ist das Prinzip der bürgerlichen Gesellschaft und tritt rein als solches hervor, sobald die bürgerliche Gesellschaft den politischen Staat vollständig aus sich herausgeboren. Der Gott des praktischen Bedürfnisses und Eigennutzes ist das Geld. Das Geld ist der eifrige Gott Israels, vor welchem kein andrer Gott bestehen darf. Das Geld erniedrigt alle Götter des Menschen, - und verwandelt sie in Waare.

Behind Jewish monotheism is the polytheism of various needs, a polytheism which turns even a doormat into an object of the divine law. The practical need, the egoism is the fundament of the civil society and itself finally emerges clearly, when a civil society has born its own political state entirely. The God of the practical need and self-interest is the money. The money is the busily God of Israel who do not accept any other God beneath himself. The money humiliates all Gods of mankind and turns them into a ware.

Bauer's reference to the golden calf may be regarded a modern form of antisemitism. But Karl Marx turned Bauer's reference into a "syncretism between Mosaic monotheism and Babylonian polytheism". His answer was antisemitic, as far as it was antisemitic that his family was forced to leave their religious tradition for very existential reasons. He hardly foresaw that the rhetorical use of Judaism as a metaphor of capitalism (originally a satirical construction of Heinrich Heine, talking about the "prophet Rothschild") will be constantly repeated in a completely unsatirical way in the history of socialism. Karl Marx used these words in a less satirical than in an antihumanistic way. Its context was the controversy between Old and Young Hegelian and his polemic aimed the "Old Hegelian". He regarded their thoughts as a Prussian form of the ancien régime, figured and justified as the humanists, and himself as part of a Jewish privileged minority which was more adapted to modern citizenship than any representative of the Prussian ancien régime. While the humanists felt threatened by the industrial revolution, also because they simply feared to lose their privileges, it was no longer the parvenu (as Bernard Lazare would call the rich minority later) who needed to be "ameliorated".

Moses Mendelssohn was not mentioned in Marx's answer to the Jewish question, but Marx might have regarded his arguments as an important part of the humanists' approach to ameliorate the Prussian constitution. Nevertheless, Mendelssohn had already discussed the problem of injustice caused by material needs in his way: In Jerusalem he advised to recompense politicians according to the loss of their regular income. It should not be lower for a rich man, and not higher for a poor. Because if anyone will have a material advantage, just by being a member of parliament, the result cannot be a fair state governing a just society. Only an idealistic citizen who was engaging in politics according to his modern religious education, was regarded as a politician by Moses Mendelssohn.

=== Mendelssohn's philosophy during the Age of Zionism ===
Karl Marx's point of view that the idealistic hopes for religious tolerance will be disappointed in the field of politics, and soon the political expectations will disappear in a process of economical evolution and of secularization of their religious values, was finally confirmed by the failure of the 1848 revolution. Though the fact that revolutionary antisemitism was used frequently by left and right wing campaigners, for him it was more than just rhetoric. His own cynical and refusing attitude concerning religion was widespread among his contemporaries, and it was related to his biography and a personal experience full of disappointments and conflicts within the family. Equal participation in political decisions was not granted by a national law as they hoped, the participation was merely dependent on privileges which were defined by material values and these transformations cause a lot of fears and the tendence to turn backwards. Even in France where the constitution granted the equal status as citizens since 100 years, the Dreyfus affair made evident that a lot of institutions of the French Republic like the military forces were already ruled by the circles of the ancien régime. So the major population was still excluded from participation and could not identify with the state and its authorities. Social movements and emigration to America or to Palestine were the response, often in a combination. The utopies of these movements were sometimes secular, sometimes religious, and they often had charismatic leaders.

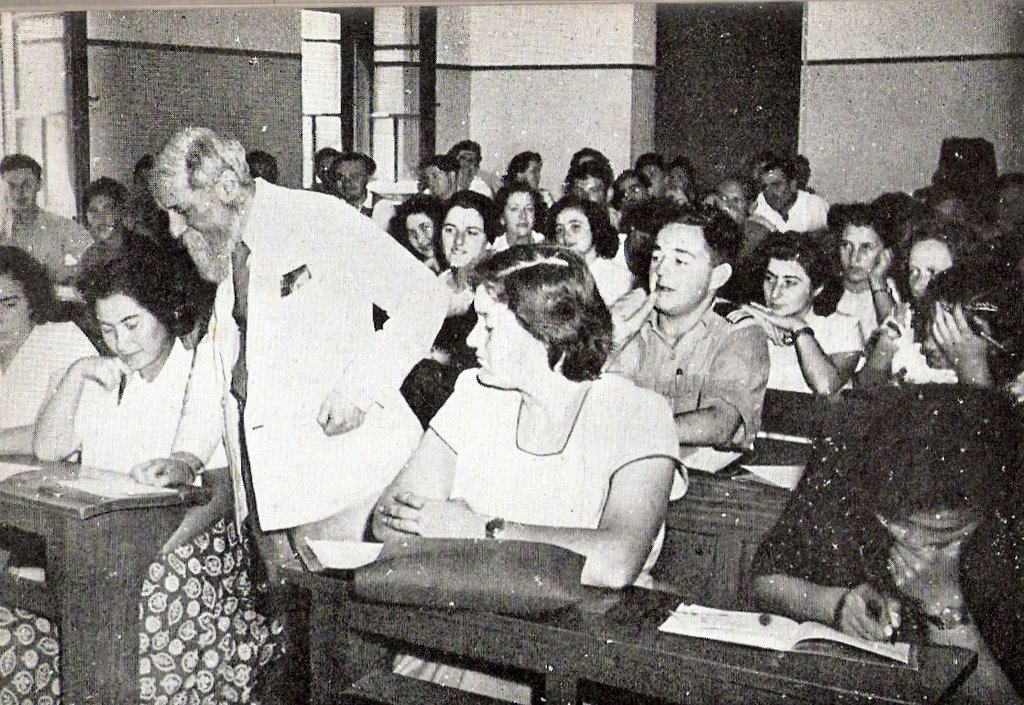
Martin Buber among his students

1897 there was the First Zionist Congress in Basel (Switzerland), which was an initiative by Theodor Herzl. The Zionist Martin Buber with his rather odd combination of German Romanticism (Fichte) and his interest in Hasidism as a social movement was not very popular on the Congress, but he finally found a very enthusiastic reception in a Zionist student association in Prague, which was also frequented by Max Brod and Franz Kafka. In a time when the Jewish question has become a highly ideological matter mainly treated in a populistic way from outside, it became a rather satirical subject for Jewish writers of Yiddish, German, Polish and Russian language.

Franz Kafka learned Yiddish and Hebrew as an adult and he had a great interest for Hasidism as well as for rabbinic literature. He had a passion for Yiddish drama which became very popular in Central Europe that time and which brought Yiddish literature, usually written as narrative prosa, on stage mixed up with a lot of music (parodies of synagogue songs etc.). His interest corresponded to Martin Buber's romantic idea that Hasidism was the folk culture of Ashkenazi Jews, but he also realized that this romanticism inspired by Fichte and German nationalism, expressed the fact that the rural traditions were another world quite far from its urban admirers. This had changed since Maskilim and school reformers like Israel Jakobson have settled to the big towns and still disregarded Yiddish as a "corrupt" and uneducated language.

In the parable of his romance Der Process, published 1915 separately as short story entitled Vor dem Gesetz, the author made a parody of a midrash legend, written during the period of early Merkabah mysticism (6th century), that he probably learned by his Hebrew teacher. This Pesikhta described Moses' meditation in which he had to fight against Angelic guardians on his way to the divine throne in order to bring justice (the Torah) to the people of Israel.

Somehow it also reflected Mendelssohn's essay in the context of the public debate on the Jewish question during the 1770s and 1780s, which was mainly led by Christian priests and clerics, because this parable in the romance was part of a Christian prayer. A mysterious priest prayed only for the main protagonist "Josef K." in the dark empty cathedral. The bizarre episode in the romance reflected the historical fact that Jewish emancipation had taken place within Christian states, where the separation between state power and the church was never fully realized. There were several similar parodies by Jewish authors of the 19th century in which the Christians dominating the state and the citizens of other faith correspond to the jealous guardians. Unlike the prophet Moses who killed the angel guarding the first gate, the peasant ("ein Mann vom Lande") in the parable is waiting to his death, when he finally will be carried through the gate which was only made for him. In the narration of the romance which was never published during his lifetime, the main protagonist Josef K. will finally be killed according to a judgement which was never communicated to him.

=== Hannah Arendt's reception of the Haskalah and of the emancipation history ===
Hannah Arendt's political theory is deeply based on theological and existentialist arguments, regarding Jewish Emancipation in Prussia as a failure – especially in her writings after World War II. But the earliest publication discussing the Haskalah with respect to the German debate of the Jewish Question opened by Christian Wilhelm von Dohm and Moses Mendelssohn dates to 1932. In her essay Hannah Arendt takes Herder's side in reviving the debate among Dohm, Mendelssohn, Lessing and Herder. According to her Moses Mendelssohn's concept of emancipation was assimilated to the pietist concept of Lessing's enlightenment based on a separation between the truth of reason and the truth of history, which prepared the following generation to decide for the truth of reason and against history and Judaism which was identified with an unloved past. Somehow her theological argument was very similar to that of Kant, but the other way round. For Kant as a Lutheran Christian religion started with the destruction and the disregard of the Mosaic law, whereas Herder as a Christian understood the Jewish point of view in so far, that this is exactly the point where religion ends. According to Hannah Arendt the Jews were forced by Mendelssohn's form of Haskalah to insert themselves into a Christian version of history in which Jews had never existed as subjects:

So werden die Juden die Geschichtslosen in der Geschichte. Ihre Vergangenheit ist ihnen durch das Herdersche Geschichtsverstehen entzogen. Sie stehen also wieder vis à vis de rien. Innerhalb einer geschichtlichen Wirklichkeit, innerhalb der europäischen säkularisierten Welt, sind sie gezwungen, sich dieser Welt irgendwie anzupassen, sich zu bilden. Bildung aber ist für sie notwendig all das, was nicht jüdische Welt ist. Da ihnen ihre eigene Vergangenheit entzogen ist, hat die gegenwärtige Wirklichkeit begonnen, ihre Macht zu zeigen. Bildung ist die einzige Möglichkeit, diese Gegenwart zu überstehen. Ist Bildung vor allem Verstehen der Vergangenheit, so ist der "gebildete" Jude angewiesen auf eine fremde Vergangenheit. Zu ihr kommt er über eine Gegenwart, die er verstehen muß, weil er an ihr beteiligt wurde.

In consequence the Jews have become without history in history. According to Herder's understanding of history they are separated from their own past. So again they are in front of nothing. Within a historical reality, within the European secularized world, they are forced to adapt somehow to this world, to educate themselves. They need education for everything which is not part of the Jewish world. The actual reality has come into effect with all its power, because they are separated from their own past. Culture is the only way to endure this present. As long as culture is the proper perception of the past, the "educated" Jew is depending on a foreign past. One will reach it through a certain present, just because one participated in it.

Although her point of view was often misunderstood as a prejudice against Judaism, because she often also described forms of opportunism among Jewish citizens, her main concern was totalitarianism and the anachronistic mentality of the ancien régime, as well as a postwar criticism, which was concerned with the limits of modern democracy. Her method was arguably idiosyncratic. For instance, she used Marcel Proust's romance "À la recherche du temps perdu" as a historical document and partly developed her arguments on Proust's observations of Faubourg de Saint Germain, but the publication of her book in 1951 made her very popular, because she also included an early analysis of Stalinism. Seven years later she finally published her biographical study about Rahel Varnhagen. Here she concludes that the emancipation failed exactly with Varnhagen's generation, when the wish to enter the Prussian upper society was related with the decision to leave the Jewish communities. According to her, a wealthy minority, which she called parvenues, tried to join the privileges of the ruling elite of Prussia. The term "parvenu" was taken from Bernard Lazare and she regarded it as an alternative to Max Weber's term "pariah."

== See also ==
- Baruch Spinoza's Tractatus theologico-politicus
- Thomas Hobbes' Leviathan
- John Locke's A Letter Concerning Toleration, An Essay Concerning Human Understanding
- Immanuel Kant's Die Religion innerhalb der Grenzen der blossen Vernunft
- Haskalah
- Christian Wilhelm von Dohm
- Moses Mendelssohn
- Gotthold Ephraim Lessing
- Salomon Maimon
- Hartwig Wessely
- David Friedländer
- Johann Caspar Lavater
- Johann Gottfried Herder
- Israel Jacobson

== Bibliography ==
=== Editions ===
- Mendelssohn, Moses (1783), Jerusalem: oder über religiöse Macht und Judentum. Von Moses Mendelssohn. Mit allergnädigsten Freyheiten, Berlin: Friedrich Maurer.
- Mendelssohn, Moses (1787), Jerusalem oder über religiöse Macht und Judenthum. Von Moses Mendelssohn, Frankfurt, Leipzig.
- Mendelssohn, Moses (1838), "Jerusalem, oder über religiöse Macht und Judentum", Sämmtliche Werke - Ausgabe in einem Bande als National-Denkmal, Vienna: Verlag von Mich. Schmidts sel. Witwe, pp. 217–291, ISBN 9783598518621.
- Mendelssohn, Moses (1919), Jerusalem: oder über religiöse Macht und Judentum, Berlin: Weltverlag.
- Mendelssohn, Moses (1983), "Jerusalem: oder über religiöse Macht und Judentum", in Altmann, Alexander; Bamberger, Fritz (eds.), Moses Mendelssohn: Gesammelte Schriften – Jubiläumsausgabe, vol. 8, Bad Cannstatt: Frommann-Holzboog, pp. 99–204, ISBN 3-7728-0318-0.
- Mendelssohn, Moses (1786), Moses Mendelssohns Morgenstunden oder Vorlesungen über das Daseyn Gottes, Berlin: Christian Friedrich Voss und Sohn.
- Mendelssohn, Moses (1983a), "Vorwort zu Manasseh ben Israels «Rettung der Juden»", in Altmann, Alexander; Bamberger, Fritz (eds.), Moses Mendelssohn: Gesammelte Schriften – Jubiläumsausgabe, vol. 8, Bad Cannstatt: Frommann-Holzboog, pp. 89–97, ISBN 3-7728-0318-0.
- Mendelssohn, Moses (1927), "Vorwort zu Manasseh ben Israels «Rettung der Juden»", in Freudenberger, Hermann (ed.), Im Kampf um die Menschenrechte, Frankfurt am Main: Kauffmann, pp. 40–43.
- Arendt-Stern, Hanna (1932), "Aufklärung und Judenfrage", Zeitschrift für die Geschichte der Juden in Deutschland, IV (2): 65–77, archived from the original on 17 July 2011.
- Berr, Berr Isaac (1907), "Lettre d'un citoyen, membre de la ci-devant communauté des Juifs de Lorraine, à ses confrères, à l'occasion du droit de citoyen actif, rendu aux Juifs par le décrit du 28 Septembre 1791 (Nancy 1791)", in Tama, Diogene (ed.), Transactions of the Paris Sanhedrin, Repr.: London, pp. 11–29, ISBN 3-7728-0318-0.
- Cranz, August Friedrich (1983), "Das Forschen nach Licht und Recht in einem Schreiben an Herrn Moses Mendelssohn auf Veranlassung seiner merkwürdigen Vorrede zu Mannaseh Ben Israel [The searching for light and right in a letter to Mr. Moses Mendelssohn occasioned by his remarkable preface to Mannaseh Ben Israel]", in Altmann, Alexander; Bamberger, Fritz (eds.), Moses Mendelssohn: Gesammelte Schriften – Jubiläumsausgabe, vol. 8, Bad Cannstatt: Frommann-Holzboog, pp. 73–87, ISBN 3-7728-0318-0.
- Dohm, Christian Konrad Wilhelm von (1783), Ueber die bürgerliche Verbesserung der Juden, vol. Erster Theil (1781), Zweyter Theil (1783), Berlin, Stettin: Friedrich Nicolai.
- Heine, Heinrich (1988), "Lutezia. bearbeitet von Volkmar Hansen", in Windfuhr, Manfred (ed.), Historisch-kritische Gesamtausgabe der Werke, vol. 13/1, Düsseldorf: Hoffmann und Campe, ISBN 3-455-03014-9.
- Jacobi, Friedrich Heinrich (1786), Wider Mendelssohns Beschuldigungen betreffend die Briefe über die Lehre des Spinoza, Leipzig: Goeschen.
- Jacobi, Friedrich Heinrich (1789), Ueber die Lehre des Spinoza in Briefen an den Herrn Moses Mendelssohn, Breslau: G. Löwe.
- Jacobson, Israel (1810), Hebräische und Deutsche Gesänge zur Andacht und Erbauung, zunächst für die neuen Schulen der Israelitischen Jugend von Westphalen, Cassel.
- Lavater, Johann Caspar (1774), Herrn Carl Bonnets, verschiedener Akademien Mitglieds, philosophische Untersuchung der Beweise für das Christenthum: Samt desselben Ideen von der künftigen Glückseligkeit des Menschen. Nebst dessen Zueignungsschrift an Moses Mendelssohn, und daher entstandenen sämtlichen Streitschriften zwischen Hrn. Lavater, Moses Mendelssohn und Hrn. Dr. Kölbele; wie auch de erstren gehaltenen Rede bey der Taufe zweyer Israeliten, Frankfurt am Mayn: Bayrhoffer.
- Marx, Karl (1844), "Zur Judenfrage", in Ruge, Arnold; Marx, Karl (eds.), Deutsch-Französische Jahrbücher, vol. 1ste und 2te Lieferung, pp. 182–214.

=== English translation ===
- Mendelssohn, Moses (1838a), Jerusalem: A Treatise on Ecclesiastical Authority and Judaism, transl. by Moses Samuel, vol. 2, London: Longman, Orme, Brown & Longmans.
- Mendelssohn, Moses (1983b), Jerusalem, or, On religious power and Judaism, transl. by Allan Arkush, introduction and commentary by Alexander Altmann, Hanover (N.H.) and London: University Press of New England for Brandeis University Press, ISBN 0-87451-264-6.
- Mendelssohn, Moses (2002), Schmidt, James (ed.), Mendelssohn's Jerusalem transl. by Moses Samuel, vol. 3 (repr. vol.2 (London 1838) ed.), Bristol: Thoemmes, ISBN 1-85506-984-9.
- Mendelssohn, Moses (2002), Schmidt, James (ed.), Writings related to Mendelssohn's Jerusalem transl. by Moses Samuel, vol. 2 (repr. vol.1 (London 1838) ed.), Bristol: Thoemmes, ISBN 1-85506-984-9.
- Mendelssohn, Moses (1838b), "A letter by Mendelssohn, written during his controversy with Lavater, in 1770", Jerusalem: A Treatise on Ecclesiastical Authority and Judaism, transl. by Moses Samuel, vol. 1, London: Longman, Orme, Brown & Longmans, pp. 147–154.
- Mendelssohn, Moses (1838c), "Moses Mendelssohn's Reply to Charles Bonnet", Jerusalem: A Treatise on Ecclesiastical Authority and Judaism, transl. by Moses Samuel, vol. 1, London: Longman, Orme, Brown & Longmans, pp. 155–175.
- Mendelssohn, Moses (1838d), "Preface to the German Translation of «Vindiciae Judaeorum»", Jerusalem: A Treatise on Ecclesiastical Authority and Judaism, transl. by Moses Samuel, vol. 1, London: Longman, Orme, Brown & Longmans, pp. 75–116.
- Dohm, Christian Konrad Wilhelm von (1957), Concerning the amelioration of the civil status of the Jews, transl. by Helen Lederer, Cincinnati (Ohio): Hebrew Union College-Jewish Institute of Religion.
- (Cranz), (August Friedrich) (1838), "Search for Light and Right - An Epistle to Moses Mendelssohn, occasioned by His Remarkable Preface to Rabbi Manasseh ben Israel's Vindication of the Jews", in Samuel, Moses (ed.), Jerusalem: A Treatise on Ecclesiastical Authority and Judaism, vol. 1, London: Longman, Orme, Brown & Longmans, pp. 117–145.

=== Studies ===
- Arendt, Hannah (1951), The Origins of Totalitarianism (1st ed.), New York: Harcourt Brace.
- Arendt, Hannah (1957), Rahel Varnhagen. The life of a Jewess, transl. by Richard and Clara Winston, London: East and West Library.
- Baioni, Giuliano (1984), Kafka: letteratura ed ebraismo, Torino: G. Einaudi, ISBN 978-88-06-05722-0.
- Berkovitz, Jay R. (1989), The Shaping of Jewish Identity in 19th Century France, Detroit: Wayne State UP, ISBN 0-8143-2012-0.
- Blumenberg, Hans (1986), Arbeit am Mythos (4th ed.), Frankfurt am Main: Suhrkamp, ISBN 978-3-518-57515-4.
- Bollacher, Martin (1969), Der junge Goethe und Spinoza - Studien zur Geschichte des Spinozismus in der Epoche des Sturms und Drangs, Studien zur deutschen Literatur, vol. 18, Tübingen: Niemeyer.
- Caysa, Volker; Eichler, Klaus-Dieter, eds. (1994), Praxis, Vernunft, Gemeinschaft - Auf der Suche nach einer anderen Vernunft: Helmut Seidel zum 65. Geburtstag gewidmet, Weinheim: Beltz Athenäum, ISBN 978-3-89547-023-3.
- Delf, Hanna; Schoeps, Julius H.; Walther, Manfred, eds. (1994), Spinoza in der europäischen Geistesgeschichte, Berlin: Edition Hentrich, ISBN 978-3-89468-113-5.
- Forester, Vera (2001), Lessing und Moses Mendelssohn: Geschichte einer Freundschaft, Hamburg: Europäische Verlagsanstalt, ISBN 978-3-434-50502-0.
- Goetschel, Willi (2004), Spinoza's modernity: Mendelssohn, Lessing, and Heine, Madison, Wis.: University of Wisconsin Press, ISBN 0-299-19084-6.
- Gotzmann, Andreas (2002), Eigenheit und Einheit: Modernisierungsdiskurse des deutschen Judentums der Emanzipationszeit, Studies in European Judaism, Leiden, Boston, Colon: Brill, ISBN 90-04-12371-7.
- Guttmann, Julius (1931), Mendelssohns Jerusalem und Spinozas Theologisch-Politischer Traktat, Berlin: S. Scholem.
- Hammacher, Klaus (1985), "Ist Spinozismus Kabbalismus? Zum Verhältnis von Religion und Philosophie im ausgehenden 17. und dem beginnenden 18. Jahrhundert", Archivio di Filosofia, 53: 29–50.
- Idelsohn, Abraham Zebi (1992), Jewish music - Its Historical Development, with a new introduction by Arbie Orenstein, Dover books on music (9 ed.), New York: Dover Publications, ISBN 0-486-27147-1.
- Librett, Jeffrey S. (2000), The rhetoric of cultural dialogue: Jews and Germans from Moses Mendelssohn to Richard Wagner and beyond, Stanford: Stanford University Press, ISBN 0-8047-3931-5.
- Roemer, Nils H. (2005), Jewish scholarship and culture in nineteenth-century Germany: between history and faith, Studies in German Jewish cultural history and literature, Madison: Univ of Wisconsin Press, ISBN 0-299-21170-3.
- Rose, Paul Lawrence (1990), German Question / Jewish Question: Revolutionary Antisemitism in Germany from Kant to Wagner, Princeton, N.J., Oxford: Europäische Verlagsanstalt, ISBN 0-691-03144-4.
- Samuel, Moses (2002), Schmidt, James (ed.), Moses Mendelssohn - The First English Biography and Translations, vol. 1–3 (repr. ed.), Bristol: Thoemmes, ISBN 1-85506-984-9.
- Sorkin, David Jan (1996), Moses Mendelssohn and the Religious Enlightenment, Berkeley: University of California Press, ISBN 0-520-20261-9.
- Stern, Selma (1962–1975), "Der Preussische Staat und die Juden. T. 1-3. [in 7 Bdn, nebst Gesamtregister]", in Kreutzberger, Max (ed.), Schriftenreihe wissenschaftlicher Abhandlungen des Leo Baeck Instituts, vol. 7–8, 22, 24, 32 (repr ed.), Tübingen: Mohr.
- Ṿolḳov, Shulamit (2000), "Die Juden in Deutschland 1780-1918", in Gall, Lothar; Blickle, Peter (eds.), Enzyklopädie deutscher Geschichte (2 ed.), Munich: Oldenbourg Wissenschaftsverlag, ISBN 3-486-56481-1.
- Ṿolḳov, Shulamit (2006), Germans, Jews, and antisemites, Cambridge: Cambridge University Press, ISBN 0-521-84688-9.
- Wandruszka, Adam; Urbanitsch, Peter, eds. (1985), Die Habsburgermonarchie 1848-1918 : Bd. IV : Die Konfessionen, Wien: Verlag der Österreichischen Akademie der Wissenschaften, ISBN 3700106580.
- Zac, Sylvain, ed. (1978), Lo Spinozismo ieri e oggi, Archivio di filosofia, vol. 1, Padova: Cedam.
