= Avrom Ber Gotlober =

Russian Jewish writer, journalist, and educator

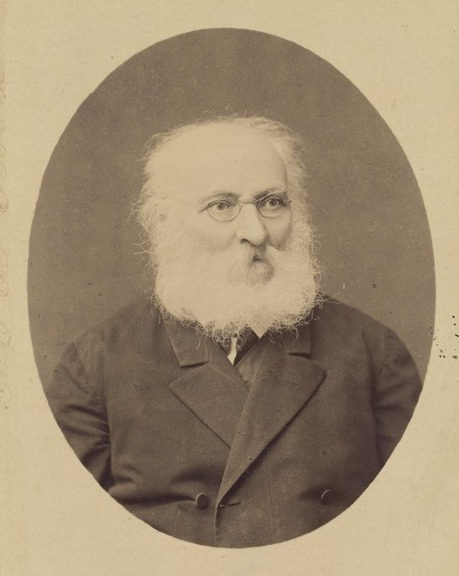
- Native name: אברהם־בער גאָטלאָבער
- Born: 14 January 1811 Starokonstantinov, Volhynian Governorate, Russian Empire (now Ukraine)
- Died: 12 April 1899 (aged 88) Białystok, Grodno Governorate, Russian Empire (now Poland)
- Language: Hebrew, Yiddish
- Literary movement: Haskalah
- Years active: 1835–1890

Avrom Ber Gotlober (Yiddish: אברהם־בּער גאָטלאָבּער; 14 January 1811 – 12 April 1899), also known by the pen names Abag (Hebrew: אב״ג) and Mahalalel (Hebrew: מַהֲלַלְאֵל), was a Russian Maskilic writer, poet, playwright, historian, journalist and educator. His first collection was published in 1835.

== Biography ==
Avrom Ber Gotlober was born to a Jewish family in Starokonstantinov, where he received a traditional Jewish education. His father was a ḥazzan who sympathized with the progressive movement. At the age of fourteen Gotlober married the daughter of a wealthy Hasid in Chernigov, and settled there. When his inclination for secular knowledge became known, his father-in-law, on the advice of a Hasidic rabbi, caused the young couple to be divorced. After a failed second marriage, in 1830, he married for the third time and settled in Kremenetz, where he formed a lasting acquaintance with Isaac Baer Levinsohn.

Gotlober traveled and taught from 1836 to 1851, when he went to Zhitomir and passed the teachers' examinations at the rabbinical school. After teaching for three years at a government school for Jewish boys in Kamenetz-Podolsk, he was transferred to a similar position in his native city, where he remained for about eleven years. Among Gotlober's students were Mendele Mocher Sforim, Sholom Aleichem, and Abraham Goldfaden.

In 1865 he became a teacher in the rabbinical school in Zhitomir, and remained there until it was closed by the government in 1873. He then settled in Dubno with his son-in-law, who was the official rabbi of that town. Thence he removed to Kovno, and subsequently to Białystok, where the aged poet, who in later years had become blind, ended his days in poverty and neglect.

Gotlober was the grandfather of Avraham Yahel.

== Work ==
Gottlober was a prolific writer and one of the foremost of modern Hebrew poets. The first collection of his poems, which was entitled Pirḥe ha-Aviv, appeared in Yozefov in 1836. A second collection, entitled Ha-Nitzanim (Vilna, 1850), was followed by Anaf Etz Avot, three poems, on the death of Nicholas I of Russia, on the peace of 1856, and on the coronation of Alexander II, respectively (Vilna, 1858). Soon afterward he visited Austria, where he published Shir ha-Shirim, a translation of a Passover sermon delivered by Adolf Jellinek (Lemberg, 1861), and Mi-Mitzrayim, a translation of Ludwig August von Frankl's account of his travels in the Middle East, with an appendix by Max Letteris (Vienna, 1862).

Gottlober's next important work was the Bikoret le-Toledot ha-Kara'im, a critical investigation of the history of the Karaites, with notes by Abraham Firkovich (Vilna, 1865). In the same year were published his Yerushalayim, a translation of Mendelssohn's Jerusalem, with an introduction, and his allegorical drama Tif'eret li-Bene Binah (Zhitomir, 1867), modeled after Moshe Chaim Luzzatto's La-Yesharim Tehillah.

His Iggeret Tza'ar Ba'ale Ḥayyim (Zhitomir, 1868) is a polemic against Abraham Uri Kovner's critical work "Ḥeker Dabar." Gottlober's Toledot ha-Kabbalah veha-Ḥasidut (Zhitomir, 1869), which purports to be a history of Kabbalah and of Hasidism, is only a diatribe against Kabbalah in which the history of Ḥasidism is scarcely mentioned. He also wrote several short Hebrew novels, and translated Lessing's Nathan the Wise, to which he added a biography of the author (Vienna, 1874).

Gottlober was the founder and editor of the Hebrew monthly Ha-Boker Or, to which some of the best contemporary writers contributed poems, articles, and stories. It had an interrupted existence of about seven years, first appearing in Lemberg (1876-1879) and then in Warsaw (1880–81), in which place also the last five numbers were issued in 1885–86. His most important contribution to this magazine was undoubtedly his autobiography Zikronot mi-Yeme Ne'urai, containing much material for the culture-history of the Jews of Russia, which was reprinted in book form at Warsaw, 1880–81. The last collection of his poems is entitled Kol Shire Mahalalel, 3 vols., Warsaw, 1890.

== Archives ==
Manuscripta and correspondence of A. B. Gotlober are preserved at the Institute of Oriental Manuscripts of the Russian Academy of Sciences in St. Petersburg, Russia.

== Sources ==
- https://www.jewishencyclopedia.com/articles/6830-gottlober-abraham-baer
- Wiener, Yiddish Literature in the Nineteenth Century, index, New York. 1899.
- https://tablet.otzar.org/#/book/167491/p/14/t/1/fs/0/start/0/end/0/c
- https://www.congressforjewishculture.org/people/6188/Gotlober-Avrom-Ber
