= Jutta Götzmann =

German art historian (born 1965)

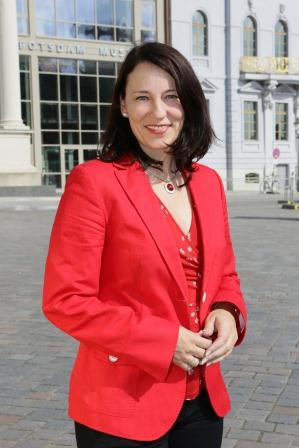
- Jutta Götzmann in front of the Potsdam Museum
- Born: 1965 (age 59–60); Ascheberg, Germany

Jutta Götzmann (born 1965, Ascheberg) is a German art historian. Since 2008, she has been the director of the Potsdam Museum.

== Life and career ==
Götzmann studied art history, German philology and pedagogy in Münster, Germany and Rome, Italy. She was a member of the Gerda Henkel Stiftung. In 2002, she taught at the University of Münster on the subject of Roman tombs of the High Renaissance.

After her academic internship at the Westphalian State Museum of Art and Cultural History and their participation in the project office of the 26 euro Europe exhibition "1648 - War and Peace in Europe" was Götzmann 2003/04 a research fellowship at the Bibliotheca Hertziana (Max-Planck-Institut History of Art). From Rome, she joined in 2004 as curator and project manager of the 29 euro Europe exhibition in Berlin and the German Historical Museum. In 2008, she was founding director of the Potsdam Museum and took over the management of the establishment of the museum at the new location, Alter Markt. In addition to her curatorial work and their collection line for art from the 19th to the 21st century, she took courses and research projects at the University of Münster (2008–09), the University of Applied Sciences Potsdam (2010/11) and the HTWK (2006 / 07, 2011/12 and 2013/14). In addition, she has worked on several committees, such as the Advisory Board of the Foundation's funds German Cultural Council and the Board of Trustees of the Foundation Siegward Sprotte . As chairman of the advisory board of art in public space, she initiated with the committee the 2013 Walk of Modern Art Potsdam. Jutta Götzmann is the author of numerous writings on the ancient and the modern and contemporary art.

== Curated exhibitions ==
=== Potsdam Museum - Forum for Art and History ===
- 2014: City Picture / art room. Drafts of the city in works of Potsdam and East Berlin artists (1949-1990)
- 2014: Carl Blechen, and Carl Gustav Wegener dialog. Romanticism and Realism in landscape painting
- 2013 Life Works - Stötzer / Ranger / Heisig / Grzimek / Metzkes / Paris. Exhibition on the 10th anniversary of the Brandenburg Art Prize
- 2013 world look colored - Retrospective
- 2012 Friedrich and Potsdam. The invention (s) of a city
- From 2010/2011 to Otto Mueller Max Kaus. Graphical individual prints and portfolios from the Ferdinand Möller Publisher

=== Deutsches Historisches Museum ===
- 2006: Holy Roman Empire of the German Nation: Old Empire and New States from 1495 to 1806. 29 Council of Europe exhibition in Berlin and Magdeburg

== Literature ==
- Jutta Götzmann, head of the Potsdam Museum on the double exhibition to Carl Blechen, and Carl Gustav Wegener. Potsdamer Latest News from March 5, 2014
- A museum of Potsdam. Märkische Allgemeine Zeitung, July 20, 2013
- Jutta Götzmann passes Potsdam Museum. Berliner Morgenpost October 15, 2008
