= Jewish emancipation =

1700s–1900s European granting of liberties to Jews

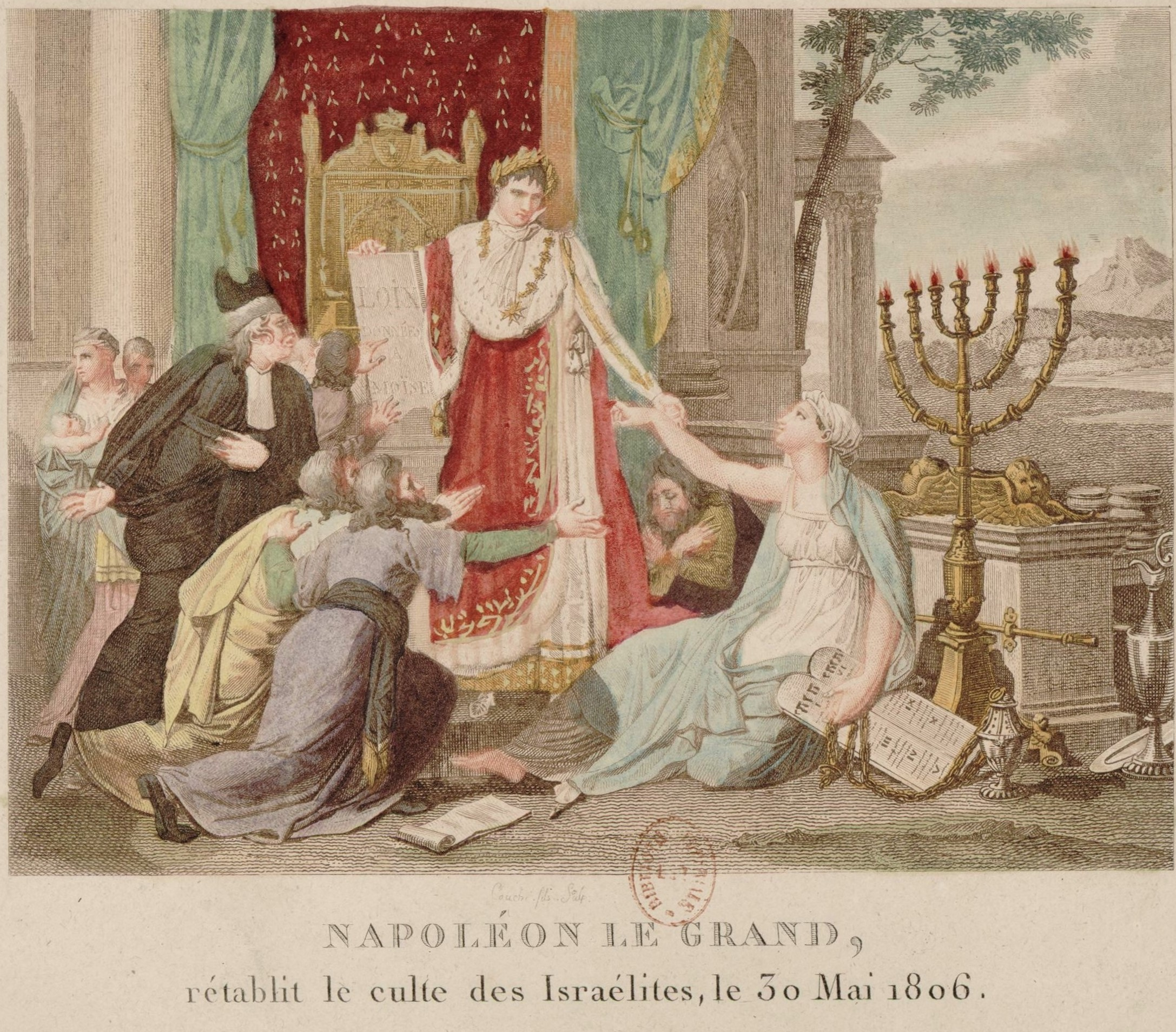
An 1806 French print depicts Napoleon Bonaparte emancipating the Jews

Jewish emancipation was the process in various nations in Europe of eliminating Jewish disabilities, to which European Jews were then subject, and the recognition of Jews as entitled to equality and citizenship rights. It included efforts within the community to integrate into their societies as citizens. It occurred gradually between the late 18th century and the early 20th century.

Jewish emancipation followed after the Age of Enlightenment and the concurrent Haskalah, or Jewish Enlightenment. Various nations repealed or superseded previous discriminatory laws applied specifically against Jews where they resided. Before the emancipation, most Jews were isolated in residential areas from the rest of the society; emancipation was a major goal of European Jews of that time, who worked within their communities to achieve integration in the majority societies and broader education. Many became active politically and culturally within wider European civil society as Jews gained full citizenship. They immigrated to countries offering better social and economic opportunities, such as the United Kingdom and the Americas. Some European Jews turned to socialism, Zionism, or both.

== Background ==
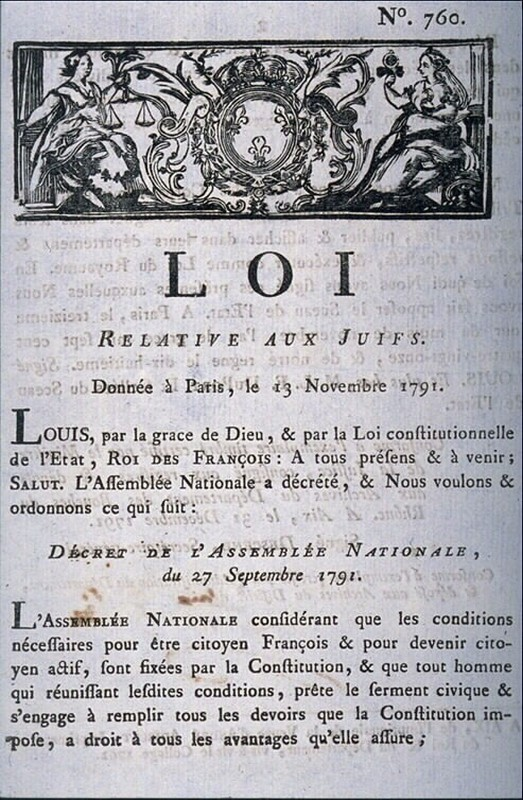
The 1791 law proclaiming the Emancipation of the Jews – Musée d'Art et d'Histoire du Judaïsme

Jews were subject to a wide range of restrictions throughout most of European history. The Fourth Council of the Lateran in 1215 which was enforced in some places required Jews to wear special clothing, such as the Judenhut and the yellow badge for Jews, to distinguish them from Christians. The practice of their religions was often restricted, and they had to swear special oaths. Jews were not allowed to vote, where voting existed, and some countries formally prohibited their entry, such as Norway, Denmark and Spain after the expulsion in the late 15th century.

In 1251 Béla IV of Hungary gave the Jews of the Kingdom equal rights and legal protection, which was an important step towards Jewish emancipation.

Jewish involvement in gentile society began during the Age of Enlightenment. Haskalah, the Jewish movement supporting the adoption of enlightenment values, advocated an expansion of Jewish rights within European society. Haskalah followers advocated "coming out of the ghetto", not just physically but also mentally and spiritually.

In 1790, in the United States, President George Washington wrote a letter establishing that Jews in America would share full equal rights, including the right to practice their religion, with all other Americans. However, Jewish commentators observed that exclusion of Jewish citizens from political office occurred in a number of areas still in 1845. In fact, American Jewish citizens organized for political rights in the 1800s, and then for further civil rights in the 1900s.

On September 28, 1791, revolutionary France emancipated its Jewish population. The 40,000 Jews living in France at the time were the first to confront the opportunities and challenges offered by emancipation. The civic equality that the French Jews attained became a model for other European Jews. Newfound opportunities began to be provided to the Jewish people, and they slowly pushed toward equality in other parts of the world. In 1796 and 1834, the Netherlands granted the Jews equal rights with non-Jews. Napoleon freed the Jews in areas he conquered in Europe outside France (see Napoleon and the Jews). Greece granted equal rights to Jews in 1830. But, it was not until the revolutions of the mid-19th century that Jewish political movements would begin to persuade governments in Great Britain and Central and Eastern Europe to grant equal rights to Jews.

In English law and some successor legal systems there was a convention known as benefit of clergy (Law Latin: privilegium clericale) by which an individual convicted of a crime, through claiming to be a Christian clergyman (usually as a pretext; in most cases the defendant claiming benefit of clergy was a layperson) could escape punishment or receive a reduced punishment. In the opinions of many contemporary legal scholars, this meant that a Jew who had not renounced Judaism could not claim benefit of clergy. In England itself the practice of granting benefit of clergy was ended in 1827 but it continued further in other jurisdictions.

== Emancipation movements ==
Caricature dating to 1830 referring to the failed vote in Parliament on Jewish Emancipation. A stereotypical Jew is attempting to enter the house. Daniel O'Connel encourages him.

The early stages of Jewish emancipation movements were part of the general progressive efforts to achieve freedom and rights for minorities. While this was a movement, it was also a pursuit for equal rights. Thus, the emancipation movement would be a long process. The question of equal rights for Jews was tied to demands for constitutions and civil rights in various nations. Jewish statesmen and intellectuals, such as Heinrich Heine, Johann Jacoby, Gabriel Riesser, Berr Isaac Berr, and Lionel Nathan Rothschild, worked with the general movement toward liberty and political freedom, rather than for Jews specifically.

In 1781, the Prussian civil servant Christian Wilhelm Dohm published the famous script Über die bürgerliche Emanzipation der Juden (English: On the Citizen Emancipation of the Jews). Dohm disproves the antisemitic stereotypes and pleads for equal rights for Jews. To this day, it is called the Bible of Jewish emancipation.

In the face of persistent anti-Jewish incidents and blood libels, such as the Damascus affair of 1840, and the failure of many states to emancipate the Jews, Jewish organizations formed to push for the emancipation and protection of their people. The Board of Deputies of British Jews under Moses Montefiore, the Central Consistory in Paris, and the Alliance Israelite Universelle all began working to assure the freedom of Jews.

Jewish emancipation, implemented under Napoleonic rule in French occupied and annexed states, suffered a setback in many member states of the German Confederation following the decisions of the Congress of Vienna. In the final revision of the Congress on the rights of the Jews, the emissary of the Free Hanseatic City of Bremen, Johann Smidt – unauthorised and unconsented to by the other parties – altered the text from "The confessors of Jewish faith are preserved the rights already conceded to them in the confederal states", by replacing a single word, which entailed serious consequences, into: "The confessors of Jewish faith are preserved the rights already conceded to them by the confederal states." A number of German states used the altered text version as legal grounds to reverse the Napoleonic emancipation of Jewish citizens. The Prussian emissary Wilhelm von Humboldt and the Austrian Klemens von Metternich promoted the preservation of Jewish emancipation, as maintained by their own countries, but were not successful in others.

During the Revolutions of 1848, Jewish emancipation was granted by the Basic Rights of the Frankfurt Parliament (Paragraph 13), which said that civil rights were not to be conditional on religious faith. But only some German states introduced the Frankfurt parliamentary decision as state law, such as Hamburg; other states were reluctant. Important German states, such as Prussia (1812), Württemberg (1828), Electorate of Hesse (1833), and Hanover (1842), had already emancipated their Jews as citizens. By doing so, they hoped to educate the gentiles, and terminate laws that sought to oppress the Jews. Although the movement was mostly successful; some early emancipated Jewish communities continued to suffer persisting or new de facto, though not legal, discrimination against those Jews trying to achieve careers in public service and education. Those few states that had refrained from Jewish emancipation were forced to do so by an act of the North German Federation on 3 July 1869, or when they acceded to the newly united Germany in 1871. The emancipation of all Jewish Germans was reversed by Nazi Germany from 1933 until the end of World War II.

== Dates of emancipation ==
In some countries, emancipation came with a single act. In others, limited rights were granted first in the hope of "changing" the Jews "for the better."

Years when legal equality was granted to Jews
Year	Country
1264	Poland
1782	Holy Roman Empire
1790	United States of America
1791	France
1796	Batavian Republic – Netherlands
1808	Grand Duchy of Hesse
1808	Westphalia
1811	Grand Duchy of Frankfurt
1812	Mecklenburg-Schwerin
1812	Prussia
1813	Kingdom of Bavaria
1826	Maryland, United States (the Jew Bill revised Maryland law to permit a Jew to hold office if he professed belief in "a future state of rewards and punishments".)
1828	Württemberg
1830	Belgium
1830	Greece
1831	Jamaica
1832	Canada (Lower Canada (Quebec))
1833	Electorate of Hesse
1834	United Netherlands
1839	Ottoman Empire
1842	Kingdom of Hanover
1848	Nassau
1849	Hungarian Revolutionary Parliament declared and enacted the emancipation of Jews, the law was repealed by the Habsburgs after the joint Austrian-Russian victory over Hungary
1849	Denmark
1849	Hamburg
1856	Switzerland
1858	United Kingdom of Great Britain and Ireland
1861	Italy (Italy had not existed as a unified nation prior to 1861 and had previously been divided amongst several foreign entities)
1862	Baden
1863	Holstein
1864	Free City of Frankfurt
1865	Mexico
1867	Austrian Empire
1867	Restoration of the law of emancipation in Kingdom of Hungary after the Austro-Hungarian Compromise
1869	North German Confederation
1870	Sweden-Norway (1851 in Norway)
1871	Germany
1877	New Hampshire, United States (last US state to lift restrictions limiting public office to Protestants)
1878	Bulgaria
1878	Serbia
1890	Brazil
1911	Portugal
1917	Russia
1918	Finland
1923	Romania
1945–1949	West Germany
1978	Spain

== Consequences ==
=== Emancipation, integration, and assimilation ===
The newfound freedom of Jews in places such as France, Italy, and Germany, at least during the Empire, permitted many Jews to leave the ghettos, benefitting from and contributing to wider society for the first time. Thus, with emancipation, many Jews' relationships with Jewish belief, practice, and culture evolved to accommodate a degree of integration with secular society. Where Halacha (Jewish law) was at odds with local law of the land, or where Halacha did not address some aspect of contemporary secular life, compromise was often sought in the balancing of religious and secular law, ethics, and obligations. Consequently, while some remained firm in their established Jewish practice, the prevalence of emancipated Jewry prompted gradual evolution and adaptation of the religion, and the emergence of new denominations of Judaism including Reform during the 19th century, and the widely practiced Modern Orthodoxy, both of which continue to be practiced by strong Jewish communities today.

Critics of the Haskalah lament the emergence of inter-religious marriage in secular society, as well as the dilution of Halacha and Jewish tradition, citing waning religiosity, dwindling population numbers, or poor observance as contributors to the potential disappearance of Jewish culture and dispersion of communities. In contrast, others cite antisemitic events such as the Holocaust as more detrimental to the continuity and longevity of Judaism than the Haskalah. Emancipation offered Jewish people civil rights and opportunities for upward mobility, and assisted in dousing the flames of widespread Jew-hatred (though never completely, and only temporarily). This enabled Jews to live multifaceted lives, breaking cycles of poverty, enjoying the spoils of Enlightened society, while also maintaining strong Jewish faith and community. While this element of emancipation gave rise to antisemitic canards relating to dual loyalties, and the successful upward mobility of educated and entrepreneurial Jews saw pushback in antisemitic tropes relating to control, domination, and greed, the integration of Jews into wider society led to a diverse tapestry of contribution to art, science, philosophy, and both secular and religious culture.

== See also ==
- Emancipation of the Jews in the United Kingdom
- Jewish Enlightenment
- Jewish question
- Napoleon and the Jews

== Bibliography ==
- Battenberg, Friedrich (2017), Jewish Emancipation in the 18th and 19th Centuries, EGO - European History Online, Mainz: Institute of European History, retrieved: March 17, 2021 (pdf).
- Christian Wilhelm von Dohm. Über die bürgerliche Verbesserung der Juden (Berlin /Stettin 1781). Kritische und kommentierte Studienausgabe. Hrsg. von Wolf Christoph Seifert. Wallstein, Göttingen 2015, ISBN 978-3-8353-1699-7.
- David Feuerwerker. L'Émancipation des Juifs en France. De l'Ancien Régime à la fin du Second Empire. Paris: Albin Michel, 1976 ISBN 2-226-00316-9
- Heinrich Graetz, Geschichte der Juden von den ältesten Zeiten bis auf die Gegenwart: 11 vols., Leipzig: Leiner, 1900, vol. 11: Geschichte der Juden vom Beginn der Mendelssohnschen Zeit (1750) bis in die neueste Zeit (1848), reprint of the edition of last hand; Berlin: arani, 1998, ISBN 3-7605-8673-2
- Hyman, Paula E. The Jews of Modern France. Berkeley: University of California Press, 1998.
- Sorkin, David (2019). Jewish Emancipation: A History Across Five Centuries. Princeton University Press. ISBN 978-0-691-16494-6.
