= Andreas Gotzmann =

German historian

Andreas Gotzmann (born 1960 in Karlsruhe) is a German historian of Judaism and scholar of religion. He holds the Chair for Jewish Studies and Religious Studies at the University of Erfurt.

== Education ==
Andreas Gotzmann graduated from the Center for Jewish Studies Heidelberg and Heidelberg University in 1988 with an M.A. in Jewish History, Rabbinics & Codices, and Jewish Art History. He received his Ph.D. in Jewish Studies at the Free University of Berlin in 1995. Between 1990-1995 he was a research fellow in New York and Jerusalem; from 1994-1997 he was first a research assistant, then assistant professor for Jewish History and Culture at the Goethe University Frankfurt; and since 1999 full professor for Jewish Studies at the newly founded Erfurt University.

Amongst other memberships and positions, he was member of the executive board of the ‚Association for Jewish Studies in Germany‘ (Verband der Judaisten in Deutschland) from 2002–2006; between 2003-2007 director of the Religious Studies Seminar at Erfurt University; still long-time member of the executive board of the ‚German Board for Scientific Research‘ (Wissenschaftliche Arbeitsgemeinschaft) of the International Leo Baeck Institute etc. Amongst other invitations: Very Distinguished Harris Visiting Professor for Jewish History at Dartmouth College, Hanover NH in 2002.

== Research ==
Andreas Gotzmann authors numerous scholarly publications, mainly about German-Jewish history. His expertise covers the early modern and the modern period. Special fields of interest are research on cultural change and processes of social consolidation of cultural models and identities, legal and social history, as well as history of mentalities and ideas. Beyond that, he works on the theory and method of cultural history and is one of the leading scholars to introduce approaches and methods of cultural studies to Jewish studies. Next to his research in modern Jewish history, Gotzmann heads the international research cluster entitled ‚Jewish Holy Roman Empire‘ which draws together scholars and institutions from a multitude of countries since 2003.

== Recent awards ==
For his book, Jüdische Autonomie in der Frühen Neuzeit: Recht und Gemeinschaft im deutschen Judentum (Jewish Autonomy in the Early Modern Era: Law and Community in German Judaism) published in 2008, Gotzmann received the 2010 Arnsberg Award.

== Books (amongst others) ==
Andreas Gotzmann, Jüdisches Recht im kulturellen Prozess. Die Wahrnehmung der Halacha im Deutschland des 19. Jahrhunderts, Tübingen 1997.

Andreas Gotzmann, Eigenheit und Einheit. Modernisierungsdiskurse des deutschen Judentums der Emanzipationszeit, Leiden 2002.

Andreas Gotzmann, Jüdische Autonomie in der Frühen Neuzeit. Recht und Gemeinschaft im deutschen Judentum, Göttingen 2008.

Andreas Gotzmann/Liedtke, Rainer/Rahden, Till van (eds.), Juden – Bürger – Deutsche. Zu Vielfalt und Grenzen in Deutschland, Tübingen 2001.

Andreas Gotzmann/Makrides, Vasilios/Malik, Jamal/Rüpke, Jörg (eds.): Religiöser Pluralismus in Europa, Marburg 2001.

Andreas Gotzmann (ed.) Kehilat Friedberg, 2 Bde., Friedberg (H) 2002: Bd. 1: Kasper-Holtkotte, Cilli, Jüdisches Leben in Friedberg (16.-18. Jahrhundert); Bd. 2: Litt, Stefan, Protokollbuch und Statuten der jüdischen Gemeinde Friedberg (16.-18. Jahrhundert), Friedberg (Hessen) 2002.

Andreas Gotzmann/Christian Wiese (eds.), Modern Judaism and Historical Consciousness: Identities - Encounters - Perspectives, Boston 2007.

Andreas Gotzmann/Michael Brenner/Yfaat Weiss (eds.), Germans - Jews - Czechs. The Case of the Czech Lands’, München 2005 (Bohemia; 46,1 / special edition).

Andreas Gotzmann/Stephan Wendehorst (eds.) Juden im Recht. Neue Zugänge zur Rechtsgeschichte der Juden im Alten Reich, Berlin 2007 (Zeitschrift für Historische Forschung, Beiheft; 39).
