= Christian Wilhelm von Dohm =

German historian and political writer (1751–1820)

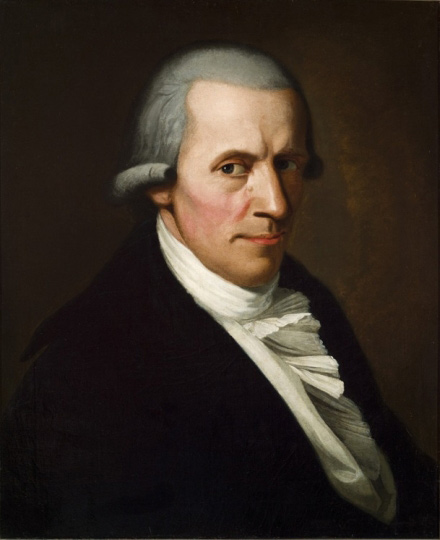
Christian Wilhelm von Dohm; portrait by Karl Christian Kehrer (c. 1795)

Christian Wilhelm von Dohm (German: [doːm]; 11 December 1751 – 29 May 1820) was a German historian, political writer, and official for the Prussian state. His work, On the Civil Improvement of the Jews, went on to influence the process of Jewish emancipation.

== Biography ==
Christian Konrad Wilhelm Dohm was born in Lemgo on 11 December 1751. The son of a Lutheran pastor at Lemgo's St. Mary's Church, he was a radical advocate for Jewish emancipation. He studied technology and law and in 1779 entered Prussian officialdom, first as archivist in Berlin, where he met Moses Mendelssohn. In 1781, Dohm published a two-volume work entitled Ueber die bürgerliche Verbesserung der Juden ("On the Civil Improvement of the Jews"), which argued for Jewish political equality on humanitarian grounds. It was widely praised by the Jewish communities in Berlin, Halberstadt, and Suriname. In 1786 he was ennobled (untitled nobility), gaining him the nobiliary particle von before his surname.

Dohm died on his Pustleben estate near Nordhausen on 29 May 1820.

== Jewish emancipation ==
Many Enlightenment thinkers were skeptical about Jewish commitment to Enlightenment ideals. Enlightenment philosophers generally believed that man had power over his own nature, and so, saw pathways for Jewish assimilation which often involved the shedding of some aspects of Jewish identity.

Dohm was one of these liberal minded Enlightenment advocates. Based on his friendship with Moses Mendelssohn, Dohm advocated for emancipation. Dohm acknowledged many of the "negative characteristics" that were troubling to liberal minded Enlightenment philosophers – moral corruption, clannish and unsociable behaviors, unproductive and primarily commercial occupations – but he argued these traits were the product of centuries of oppression by Christians and the coercive power of Talmudic Judaism over the Jewish community. He argued that the Jewish had no citizenship, no way to make a liveable income, no education, no land rights, and were heavily taxed. This gave the Jews a horrible quality of life and were in an endless cycle they could not get out of, hence they acted in unsociable ways. Dohm believed emancipation would pave the way for Jewish assimilation into Enlightenment society.^{[3]}

Dohm's voicing of opinion and advocacy for the enlightenment of the Jews provoked many debates. His work on Ueber die bürgerliche Verbesserung der Juden ("On the Civil Improvement of the Jews"), was unsuccessful at the time but created conversation for change on Jewish rights and enlightened the population on the Jewish conditions. His work contributed to the overall emancipation of the Jews both in Germany and globally.

== Editions ==
Dohm, Christian Konrad Wilhelm von (1783). Ueber die bürgerliche Verbesserung der Juden. Vol. Erster Theil (1781), Zweyter Theil (1783). Berlin, Stettin: Friedrich Nicolai.

=== English translations ===
Dohm, Christian Konrad Wilhelm von (1957). Concerning the amelioration of the civil status of the Jews, transl. by Helen Lederer. Cincinnati (Ohio): Hebrew Union College-Jewish Institute of Religion.
