= Marie Dauguet =

French poet

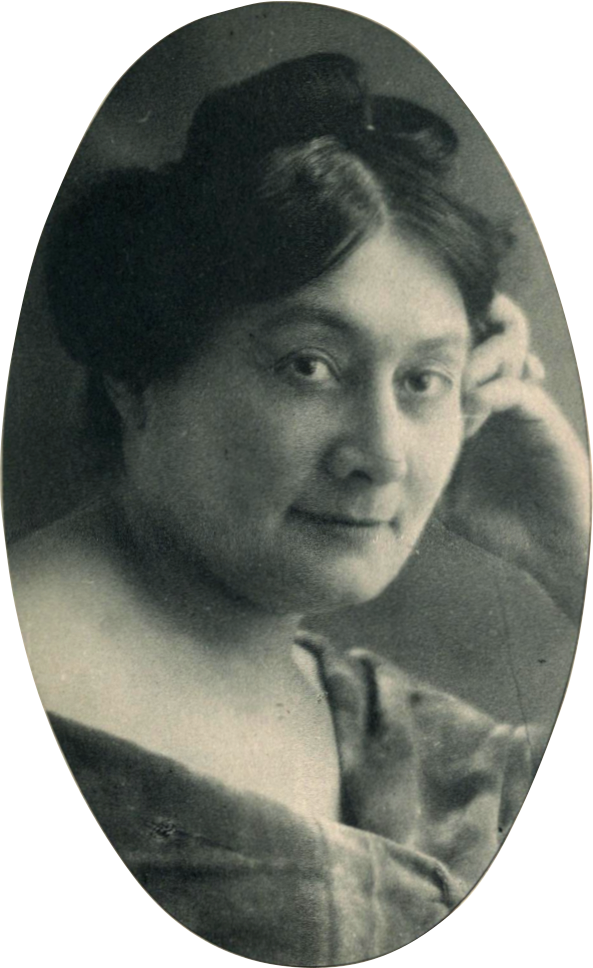
- Dauguet, ca. 1910
- Born: Julie Marie Aubert; 2 April 1860; Aillevillers-et-Lyaumont, Haute-Saône, France
- Died: 10 September 1942 (aged 82); Ville-d'Avray, Seine-et-Oise, France
- Occupation: Poet
- Notable work: À travers le voile (1902); Par l'Amour (1904); Clartés (1907); Les Pastorales (1909); L'Essor victorieux (1911)
- Movement: Symbolism, Naturalism
- Awards: Archon-Despérouses Award

Julie Marie Dauguet (née Aubert; 2 April 1860 – 10 September 1942) was a French poet.

Her first collection, À travers le voile, was published in 1902 and noticed by Stuart Merrill, who compared the poet to Verlaine and highlighted her as one of the leading figures of the Belle Époque poetic revival, along with Lucie Delarue-Mardrus and Anna de Noailles. After publishing poems in several literary journals, Dauguet published Par l'Amour in 1904, which won the Archon-Despérouses Award in 1905. Its preface, written by Remy de Gourmont, forged his image as a "nature poet", an image later cultivated by critics.

For about a decade, despite living away from Paris, Dauguet was a major figure on the literary scene, and featured in several anthologies. Enjoying a certain popularity, she was also disparaged for her use of free verse and patois words. After Clartés (1907), which demonstrated her desire to appear as a literate woman, in contrast to the "peasant poet" image held by critics, her collections Les Pastorales (1909) and L'Essor victorieux (1911) oscillated between paganism and eroticism. Having benefited from the enthusiasm for "women's poetry" at the turn of the century, her success declined as critics lost interest in women poets. Overshadowed by the success of other figures to whom she is often compared, such as Delarue-Mardrus and Anna de Noailles, she published two more collections, Ce n'est rien, c'est la Vie in 1924 and Passions in 1938, in which the early love of life gives way to disappointment and melancholy. Now largely forgotten, she is the subject of a few rare studies.

Dauguet is both associated with symbolism and naturalism, though she rejected any affiliation with a particular school of thought. Her themes and way of life bring her closer to Francis Jammes, whom she admits to admiring but denies imitating. Her evocations of nature reveal a pantheistic vision of the world. Throughout her collections, she personifies nature as a lover, using overtly sensual metaphors from Les Pastorales onwards. One of the most characteristic features of her poetry is her use of "odoural" images, a term coined for her by Remy de Gourmont and regularly used thereafter to describe the precision with which she evokes the scents of nature.

== Biography ==
=== Youth and first poems (1860-1902) ===
Julie Marie Aubert was born on April 2, 1860, at La Chaudeau, a hamlet of Aillevillers-et-Lyaumont. (Note: Gérard Walch describes La Chaudeau as an "old forge picturesquely nestled in the hollow of one of the wildest valleys in the Vosges mountains" (Walch 1907, p. 434). The present-day commune of Aillevillers-et-Lyaumont has two La Chaudeau localities, one of which was built for the widow of a forge master in the early 19th century. "Demeure d'industriel dite château de Buyer ou la Grande Chaudeau". Patrimoine en Bourgogne-France-Comté (in French). 2006.) in Haute-Saône, the daughter of Louis-Ferdinand Aubert, a wire-drawing manager, and Pauline Rose Charlotte Hamelin. In 1875, her father bought a property called Le Beuchot, in Hautevelle. She grew up surrounded by her parents, who gave her a taste for the arts. She enjoyed a free education and grew up in the heart of nature, in the foothills of the Vosges mountains, spending her time studying botany and everything around her, painting and playing music.

In her childhood, she enjoyed a free education and lived surrounded by nature, which from then on became a subject of study to her. She wrote to Alphonse Séché, for the anthology of women poets he published in 1908: "I have wasted a lot of time on various dilettantisms, ranging from physiology to botany; interested in plants, beasts, everything that is life; dividing my hours between fields, gardens, stables, painting, music and books." A first book published in 1897, La Naissance du Poète, went unnoticed. (Note: Carmen Ramírez Gómez, in her study of the critical reception of Marie Dauguet (Ramírez Gómez 2021), makes no mention of this book. Émile Faguet wrote in 1902: " Madame Marie Dauguet began in 1897 with a volume, La Naissance du Poète, which I do not know, and which I do not know whether it is verse or prose, and which I beg her to send me. A poem by Francis Jammes published in 1897 bears the same title (Read on Wikisource, In French).) On a winter's day in 1899, she wrote her first poem, Le Bon Rouet, and went on to compile her first collection, À travers le voile. She continued to paint and play music, admiring Frédéric Chopin in particular, and conceived most of her poems on the piano before writing them.

=== Success (1902-1914) ===
==== À travers le voile and press publications ====
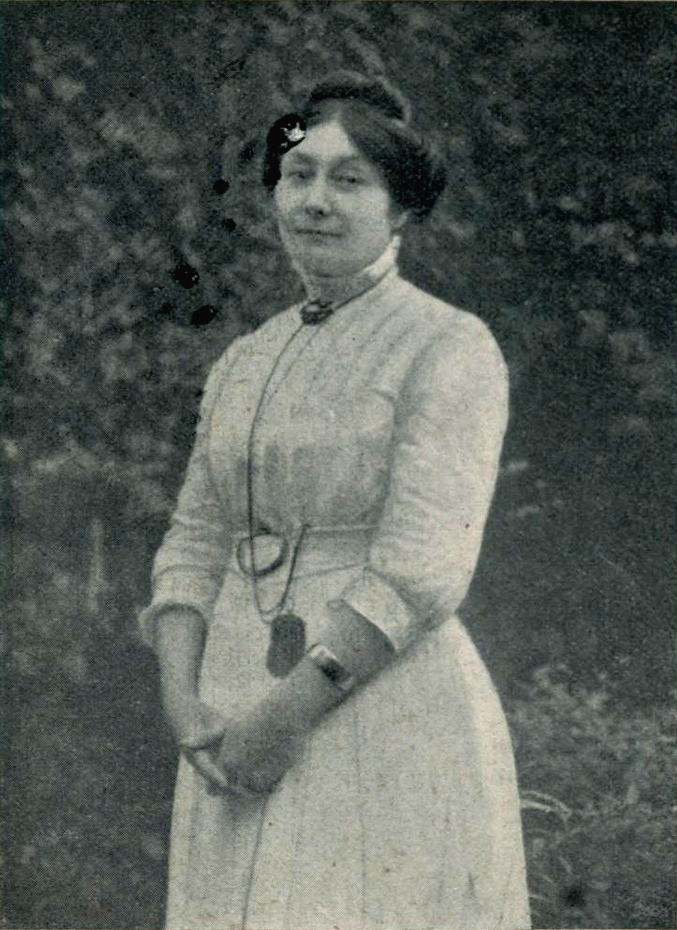
Portrait of Dauguet published in Alphonse Séché's Les Muses françaises (1908).

Dauguet published his first collection, À travers le voile, in 1902, just a few years after the emergence of literary naturism, founded by Maurice Le Blond and Saint-Georges de Bouhélier. This movement rejected symbolism and advocated simplicity, sincerity and a love of life and nature, qualities that Stuart Merrill attributed to the women poets whose work he commented on in an article published in La Plume in 1903. Women poets, left out in the 1880s and 1890s, were the subject of a certain interest from critics around 1900, who praised or criticized them. Merrill's article was one of the first to give them greater visibility. Marie Dauguet was one of the leading figures in what was then known as "feminine lyricism", (Note: Several books and articles from the period aim to define this "feminine lyricism", including Jules Bertaut's La Littérature Féminine d'aujourd'hui (1909) and Charles Maurras' Le Romantisme féminin (1905). For Patricia Izquierdo, these various expressions, which were very much in vogue at the time, aim to circumscribe female poets to a single type of writing (Izquierdo 2010).) along with Lucie Delarue-Mardrus, Marie de Heredia, Anna de Noailles and Renée Vivien, and the lesser-known Hélène Picard, Marie Krysinska, Marguerite Burnat-Provins and Marie Closset. Often quoted in the literary press, she receives less attention than Delarue-Mardrus and Anna de Noailles, although she is sometimes considered their equal. Regarding Dauguet, Merrill judges that "a great and true poet has been born to us", and compares her poem Les Croix to Verlaine's Ô mon Dieu, vous m'avez blessé d'amour. La Plume subsequently published several of Dauguet's poems, as did La Fronde, L'Ermitage and Mercure de France. The Mercure de France, originally a Symbolist journal, evolved in the 1890s, welcoming more varied poetic trends between 1896 and 1904. We read poems by Isabelle Crombez, Lucie Delarue-Mardrus, Francis Jammes and Paul Fort. Several of Dauguet's poems published in the press in 1903 were included in the collection Par l'Amour, which ensured Dauguet's growing success.

==== Par l'Amour success ====
Par l'Amour, published in 1904, was prefaced by one of the founders of the Mercure du France, Remy de Gourmont. His articles on Dauguet, and even more so his preface, were instrumental in forging his image as a "nature poet." This open support from Remy de Gourmont, a prominent figure in literary circles, ensured success for Dauguet, who lived far from Paris. Par l'Amour won the Académie française's Award Archon-Despérouses in 1905, which meant that the poet was often mentioned by literary critics, who generally compared her to Delarue-Mardrus and Anna de Noailles. An anonymous reviewer for the journal Les Arts de la vie drew up a pantheon of poets, in which Dauguet was associated with Alfred de Vigny. For her part, Dauguet declares that she imitates only Ronsard, and gets her inspiration from the poems of Francis Jammes, Marceline Desbordes-Valmore, Henri de Latouche, Sainte-Beuve and folk songs. While it enjoys a certain visibility, it is also criticized negatively for its use of free verse, patois words, outdated expressions or, on the contrary, neologisms.

Following a trip to Italy, during which she visited Rome, Venice and Naples, she published an account of her journey, Clartés (1907). Alternating between verse and prose, it evokes her vertigo in the face of centuries of history:

L'âme est remuée, les sens éblouis et chancelants. Le passé, resurgi, se formule. Tant d'exemplaires d'humanité d'une splendeur unique, jamais reproduite, ont traversé cet air que je respire, où je m'essaie à ressaisir leurs contours, leurs reflets fuyants...
—Clartés.
The soul is stirred, the senses dazzled and shaken. The past, resurgent, formulates itself. So many examples of humanity of a unique splendor, never reproduced, have passed through this air I breathe, where I try to recapture their outlines, their elusive reflections...
—Clartés

While Émile Faguet, in his review of Les Clartés, deplored the " cheap paganism" of Dauguet, Jean de Gourmont emphasized another aspect of the poet, who was no longer just a poet of nature, but also an art critic. Contrary to the portrait forged by Remy de Gourmont, Dauguet insisted on appearing intellectual, cultured and literate, and on being a figure of the female elite of the Belle Époque.

==== Les Pastorales of a "pantheist poet" ====
After the publication of Les Pastorales, dedicated to Virgil, in 1909, critics increasingly defined Dauguet by her pantheism. (Note: In 1911, Robert Veyssié called Dauguet "the pantheistic poet of the Pastorales" on the occasion of the release of l'Essor victorieux (Ramírez Gómez 2021, p. 91).) Her poems oscillate between paganism, mysticism and eroticism (which sometimes makes critics uncomfortable), and make it difficult to classify her. She is considered a great poet, but is often judged inferior to Anna de Noailles and Hélène Picard, and her use of free verse is still badly regarded.

In 1911, Dauguet published L'Essor victorieux, in which she once again highlighted her love of nature. Her book received more or less positive reviews: "a work of art and passion that places its author in the first rank of our poetesses and even of our poets" according to La Liberté, Marie Dauguet has "a deeper sensitivity [than Hélène Picard]" but "her expression remains almost always imperfect" according to Le Temps. Critics place this book under the sign of Baudelaire and Nietzsche. Difficult to classify like other female poets, Dauguet is considered an exception by some critics, who describe her with masculine characteristics. For a critic of Comœdia, there is "nothing feminine in [L'Essor victorieux]: it is a work of virile beauty almost inconceivable from the pen of a woman." Thilda Harlor, on the other hand, takes advantage of a review of À travers le voile in La Fronde to defend Dauguet, both poet and woman, and Héra Mirtel sees in L'Essor victorieux the victory of feminine beauty and purity. According to Norman R. Shapiro, the poem Je voudrais qu'on m'aime, written in the first person and in the masculine, shows Dauguet's desire to be considered solely for her art, without regard for her gender. Dauguet was the subject of entries in nine anthologies published between 1906 and 1914.

=== Oblivion (1914-1942) ===
After 1910, although female poets were still publishing, "feminine lyricism" had lost its novelty appeal and critical visibility. In 1914, Alphonse Séché cited Dauguet as one of the finest poets of her time, alongside Émile Verhaeren, Henri de Régnier, Francis Jammes, Louis Le Cardonnel, Fernand Gregh, Paul Claudel, Anna de Noailles and Hélène Picard. Some of her poems were set to music, but after her first successes, boosted by Remy de Gourmont's reviews and publications in the press, she gradually fell into oblivion.

In 1924, she published a new book, Ce n'est rien, c'est la Vie, which received positive reviews from Henri de Régnier in Le Figaro and André Fontainas in Mercure de France. Régnier, then a member of the Académie française, lamented that Dauguet "does not occupy the position she deserves in poetry." For Fontainas, there is "never a hint of mawkishness in Mme Dauguet's robust, healthy, vibrant and magnificent art." He described her as living in seclusion, isolated in the countryside, "a stranger to the petty competitions [...] of our miserable literary world." In Dauguet's last collection, Passions, published in 1938, the themes of death and disappointment with life become more prominent:

« Jadis je n'étais rien qu'une émanation,
Disais-je en t'attirant, Néant, contre mon âme,
Ne pourrais-tu percer ma chair de quelque lame ?
Sors-moi donc de la vie, cette damnation ! »
— Et je priais tout bas
"Once I was nothing but an emanation,
I said as I drew you, Void, against my soul,
Could you not pierce my flesh with some blade?
Take me out of life, this damnation!"
— Et je priais tout bas

The collection also includes numerous poems dedicated to nature, as well as a Christian-inspired section, "Seigneur, nous sommes vraiment très mal sur la Terre." Passions was again reviewed in the Mercure de France, but this time Fontainas was disappointed, regretting "a tendency to adulterate the purity of his rural, floral, woodland visions, by a desire to climb to more general thoughts, to the expression of philosophical conclusions."

== Personal life ==
On July 5, 1881, she married Henri Dauguet, who succeeded her father at the Chaudeau forges. He was a childhood friend, whom she described as "cultivated in spirit" and "open to anything that came to me from my thoughts or dreams." The couple had one daughter, Suzanne Pauline, born on April 6, 1882, and died in 1957.

After her husband's death in 1924, she moved to Enghien-les-Bains (now Val-d'Oise). She died on September 10, 1942, in a retirement home in Ville-d'Avray.

== Posterity ==
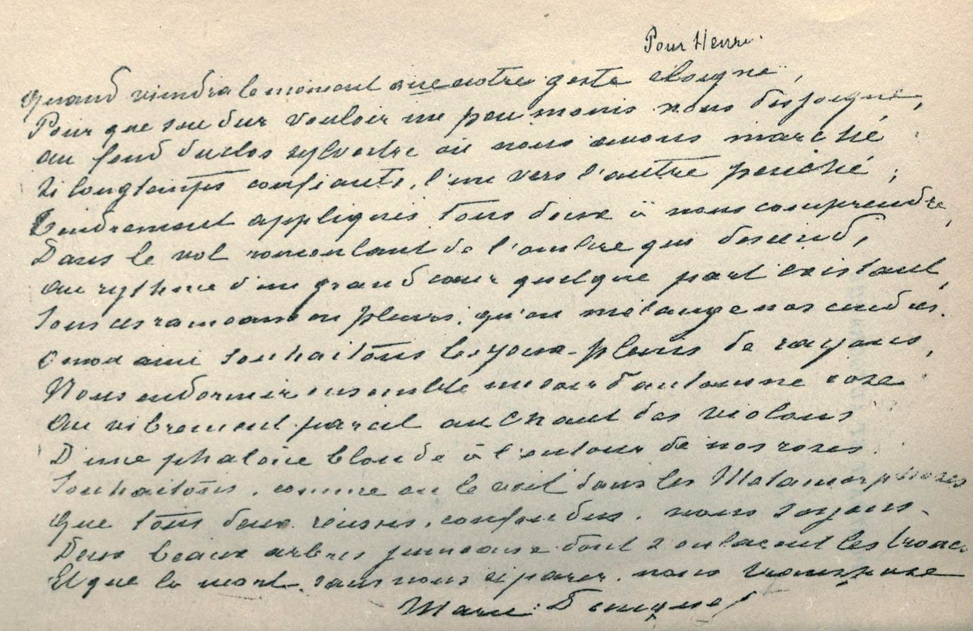
Dedication of Dauguet in Muses d'aujourd'hui by Remy de Gourmont (1910).

Fairly well known during her lifetime, thanks in particular to articles dedicated to her in the Mercure de France, Dauguet was the subject of a few studies at the beginning of the 20th century, before falling into oblivion. Biographical information on Dauguet is mainly available through articles by Émile Faguet and anthologies by Alphonse Séché (Les muses françaises, 1908) and Jeanine Moulin (La poésie féminine, 1963), who wrote an article on her for the centenary of her birth in 1960. She is briefly mentioned by Michel Décaudin (La crise des valeurs symbolistes, 1960) and Robert Sabatier (La poésie du xixe siècle, 1977), who rely mainly on her portrait drawn by Remy de Gourmont, in the many articles he devoted to her in Mercure de France. Remy de Gourmont's image of him as a "nature poet" guided most subsequent studies, to the detriment of other aspects of his work. The success of Anna de Noailles, at the same time, may have helped to eclipse his work. As of 2021, no critical edition of Dauguet's works exists.

A street in Aillevillers-et-Lyaumont bears her name.

== Insights on the work ==
=== Themes ===
==== Fin-de-siècle influence ====
For Ida Merello, Dauguet's poems are not just about describing the sensations of nature, but about the quest for the self, often evoked by fin-de-siècle poets. In À travers le voile (1902), Dauguet sees the self as fragile and variable, and uses words representative of Verlaine's influence ("uncertainty", "imprecise", "elusive", "fragile"). Her poems are similar to those of Anna de Noailles, with the difference that in her early works, Dauguet rarely evokes death; on the contrary, she advocates "the love of life" as in the last lines of the collection Par l'Amour (1904):

« Ne soyons pas celui qui recule et se cache,
Et, d'avance vaincu,
Craint d'aimer, de souffrir, de créer : c'est un lâche,
Il n'aura point vécu ! »
— Que la vie rutilante...
"Let us not be the one to retreat and hide,
And, defeated in advance,
Afraid to love, to suffer, to create: it's a coward,
He will not have lived!"
— Que la vie rutilante...

Some poems also show the influence of fin-de-siècle philosophy and literature on the author, notably Arthur Schopenhauer and Symbolism. She uses evocations of Hindu or pagan divinities such as Maya and Pan, as well as ancient Greek myths, from which she borrows names (Mainalo, Erymanthus, Cypris) or creatures (nymphs, fauns). According to Ida Merello, Dauguet's poems create a philosophical system influenced by Schopenhauer, but also by experimental psychology and Freud's theories. His worldview is characterized by its pantheism, and several of his poems evoke a sensual abandonment to nature, or erotic metaphors, such as Ode à l'amant:

« Je louerai ta brutalité,
Le sanglot rauque de ta chair;
Je louerai ta sève immense
Où l'univers est en puissance. »
— Ode à l'amant
"I'll praise your brutality,
The rough sob of your flesh;
I'll praise your immense sap
Where the universe is in power."
— Ode à l'amant

==== "A poet of nature" ====
On the frontispiece to Les Pastorales, published in 1908, Dauguet writes: "À ta grande ombre, Virgile, je dédie ces chants d'un pâtre et d'un laboureur." ("To your great shadow, Virgil, I dedicate these songs of a shepherd and a plowman.") Indeed, the direct environment of the poet, who grew up "in the midst of nature", is a central theme in her work, reflecting her attachment to the earth and her pantheistic vision of the world. From her earliest poems onwards, she gives pride of place to all the sensations nature gives her, and to her attraction to it. In À travers le voile (1902), she evokes the work and daily life of the farm, but also her meditations and vertigo, alone in front of the landscape. Les Pastorales gives greater prominence to sensuality and physical sensations, personifying nature as a lover:

« Tout s'émeut. On entend l'horizon haleter,
La terre sensuelle et lourde palpiter »
"Everything is moving. We hear the horizon pant,
The heavy sensual earth palpitates"."

This personification continues in L'Essor victorieux (1911):

« Comme l'on étreint un amant
Je presse l'ouragan dément
Sur ma poitrine découverte »
"As one embraces a lover
I press the insane hurricane
On my uncovered chest"

Smells, often precisely named, are an important element in her descriptions of nature, and contemporary critics describe her poetry as "odoral." (Note: The term is first used by Remy de Gourmont, in his preface to Par l'Amour: "How can I put it? These are 'odoral' images, either because they directly evoke country smells, or because an ingenious metaphor suggests them". Her brother Jean de Gourmont echoes this adjective: "she has the gift of bringing to life, in a palpable way, odoral impressions that seemed elusive" (Muses d'aujourd'hui, p. 90).) Her series of poems entitled Parfums, in particular, suggests all the smells of the fields, to which she gives a metaphysical meaning. For Michel Décaudin, these "odoral images" are a feature of her "lyricism of nature."

Her image as a poet of nature is widely disseminated by critics, who see in it the mark of her authenticity: she uses patois words and is described as "a true peasant" (Alphonse Séché), who "admirably responds to the idea one has of a poet of nature" (Remy de Gourmont). For Jean de Gourmont, Dauguet "reaches her most perfect beauty" when she speaks her "simple, almost rural language."

=== Style ===
==== Versification ====
Dauguet does not confine herself to either classical or free verse, and her collections include poems in alexandrine as well as poems close to prose. Her opinion on free verse seems to have evolved over time: she replied to Alphonse Séché, for the anthology published in 1908: "I admit to free verse; but regular verse subjected to a rigorous restraint becomes more nervous and more vivid." But for Filippo Tommaso Marinetti's study of free verse, published in 1909, she replied that "free verse is, in literary aesthetics, the last effort in the evolution begun by Romanticism" and that it is linked to music, and indeed "often misunderstood because there are very few excellent poets who are excellent musicians."

==== Symbolist or naturist ====
Jean de Gourmont emphasizes Dauguet's allegiance to Symbolism, through his propensity to suggest rather than describe, which characterizes this poetic style. One of his poems in the Parfums series is dedicated to Joris-Karl Huysmans, a major figure in early Symbolism, and Gourmont again notes Dauguet's "synesthesias", which he says come from Huysmans' influence. For her part, the poet associates synesthesia and free verse, two legacies of Symbolism. Her theories are reminiscent of Baudelaire's Correspondances, another source of inspiration for the Symbolists. Her first collection, À travers le voile, was published by Vanier, one of the leading publishers of the decadents and symbolists.

For Claude d'Aurel, on the other hand, Dauguet is the most representative poet of naturism. Michel Décaudin makes no mention of symbolism, but considers her to be comparable to naturism only in appearance, emphasizing the absence of heroism and grandeur in her work. She was close to Francis Jammes, who exerted a certain influence on the women poets of the time (Cécile Sauvage, Marguerite Burnat-Provins and Anna de Noailles, whom Décaudin considers to be the poet closest to Dauguet), but she differed from them in her more sincere evocations of nature, less naive and ironic, and refuted this association. She wrote to critic Pierre Quillard, after the publication of a review of Par l'Amour:

"You mentioned imitation in connection with some of my poems, likening them to the works of Jammes. I have read two books by this delightful poet, whom I admire: De l'angélus de l'aube à l'angélus du soir and Le deuil des primevères, but my hands are clean and I owe him nothing."

Dauguet seems to have wanted to detach herself from all influence: À travers le voile and Par l'Amour abound in dedications to prominent figures in the literary world, notably journalists and critics (Jammes, Sully Prudhomme, Henri de Régnier, Émile Faguet, Robert de Montesquiou...), while L'Essor victorieux contains none. Patricia Izquierdo points out that this desire to free oneself from all references is common among women poets of the period, and particularly so with Dauguet. Contemporary critics nevertheless note the proximity between Jammes and Dauguet, who lived far from Paris, had a rustic lifestyle and shared a love of nature and a strong attachment to their homelands.

== Works ==
- La Naissance du Poète. 1897.
- À Travers le Voile. Paris: Vanier. 1902.
- Les Paroles du vent. Paris: Mercure de France. 1904.
- Par l'Amour (in French). Paris: Mercure de France. 1904. awarded the Archon-Despérouses Award.18
- Clarté. Paris: Sansot. 1907.
- Les Pastorales. Paris: Sansot. 1908.
- L'Essor victorieux. Paris: Sansot. 1911.
- Ce n'est rien, c'est la vie. 1924.
- Passions (in French). Paris: Messein. 1938.

Dauguet also published in several journals: Mercure de France (1902-1907), La Plume (1903-1905), La Fronde (1902-1903), L'Ermitage (1905-1906), Poesia (1907-1908), La Lorraine (1904), Vox (1904-1906), Durendal (1905-1908), Le Beffroi (1905-1906), Les Lettres (1902), Journal d'Alsace (1906), La Revue Hebdomadaire (1902-1905), Gil Blas (1908).

== See also ==
- Marie Krysińska
- Marguerite Burnat-Provins
- Marc Lafargue
