= Hélène Picard =

French poet (1873–1945)

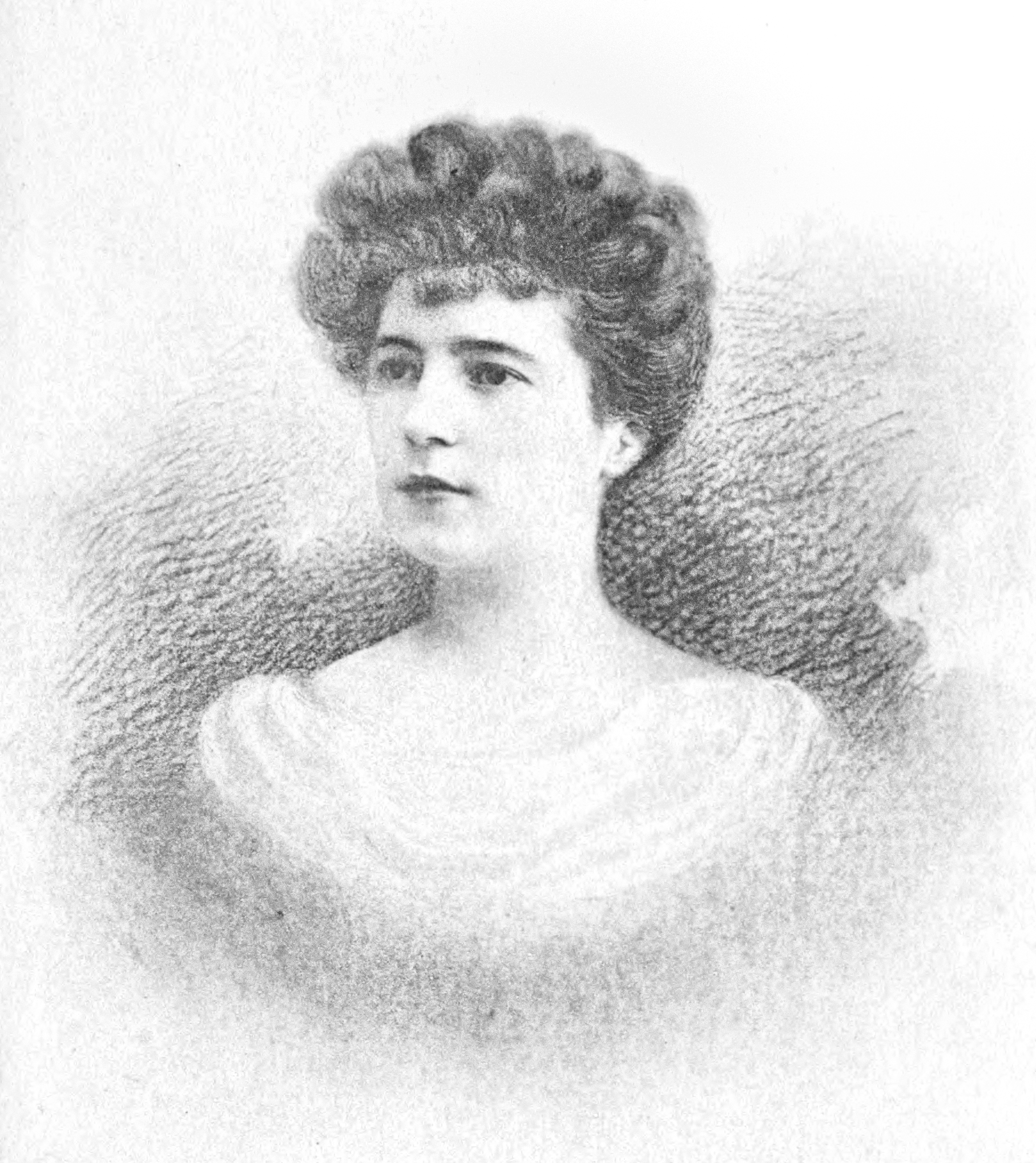
- Hélène Picard in the 1900s.
- Born: Hélène Dumarc; 1 October 1873; Toulouse, France
- Died: 1 February 1945 (aged 71); 15th arrondissement of Paris, France
- Occupations: Poet and novelist

Hélène Picard (born Hélène Dumarc, 1 October 1873 – 1 February 1945) was a French poet.

Hélène Picard first attracted attention in her native region, where she worked with poets and received two prizes from the Académie des Jeux floraux de Toulouse. Settling in Privas, Ardèche, she published her first book in 1903, La Feuille morte, a lyrical drama that went unnoticed on the national literary scene. She came to prominence in 1904, when Femina magazine organized a tournament for women poets, which she won with a poem in homage to George Sand and established her in the public eye. After two successive failures to win national prizes in 1906, she published a collection the following year, L'Instant éternel, which won critical acclaim and the Archon-Despérouses prize. Alongside Lucie Delarue-Mardrus, Renée Vivien, Anna de Noailles, and Marie Dauguet, Picard was one of the most prominent women poets of the time, in a period that saw the publication of many works written by women. Her success was short-lived, however: she published a limited edition collection for her friends in the Ardèche, Petite ville, Beau pays (1907), followed by Fresques (1908) and Souvenirs d'enfance in two volumes (1911 and 1913) with a Parisian publisher, which went unnoticed.

She left Ardèche around 1919 and moved to Paris, where she became Colette's secretary. The two began a close friendship that lasted until Picard's death. Colette had a strong influence on the poet, whom she housed and supported financially and emotionally; but Picard also advised the novelist. She published a novel in 1923, Sabbat, with a preface by Colette. An unrequited passion for Francis Carco inspired her last collection, Pour un mauvais garçon, published in 1927, which broke with the style of her early poems and was praised by critics for its originality.

Depressed and suffering from severe rheumatism, Picard gradually shut herself away, never leaving her apartment. She died on February 1, 1945. In the days following her death, Colette devotes herself to an article in her honor, which appears in La Revue de Paris, then in L'Étoile Vesper. She received several awards during her lifetime, including the Prix Archon-Despérouses, the Prix Botta, and the Prix Renaissance, and was made a Chevalier de la Légion d'Honneur.

Her style can be divided into two periods: while she initially praised country life and its simplicity with poems in classical form, after she arrived in Paris she adopted a more original and innovative style, using the capital's bars and unfriendly neighborhoods as her backdrop. Throughout her career, she also evoked themes of melancholy, idealism, and love, sometimes with an erotic dimension.

== Biography ==
=== The beginnings of an "Ardèche poet" (1873 - 1903) ===
Alice Julie Pauline Hélène Dumarc was born in Toulouse, François-Frizac Avenue, on October 1, 1873, to Léon Aristide Alphonse Dumarc, an insurance manager, and Charlotte Pauline Capdeville. She was of Ariège origin through her mother, whom she describes as calm and dreamy, and who gave her a taste for poetry; she read avidly in her teens, particularly admiring Alfred de Musset. She began to write poems, sometimes with an erotic slant, in which she expressed her desire for a loving relationship.

Between 1896 and 1898 she frequented the Toulouse poets' circle L'Effort, where she met the lawyer Jean Picard, whom she married on March 30, 1898. During this period, she became close to Pierre Fons, Marc Lafargue, Georges Gaudion, and Armand Praviel, and in 1899 and 1900 received two successive prizes from the Académie des Jeux floraux de Toulouse.

Picard then moved to Privas, where her husband was appointed Secretary General of the Ardèche Prefecture. In the first anthologies in which she is mentioned, she is described as an "Ardèche poet". She published her first book in 1903, La Feuille morte, a lyrical piece, with a publisher in Privas. The work was reviewed by Émile Faguet, who pointed out its "considerable flaws" but considered Picard to have a "gift" for poetry. The play, performed only in regional theaters, went unnoticed by Parisian audiences.

=== Success on the Paris literary scene (1904 - 1910) ===
==== The Femina tournament ====
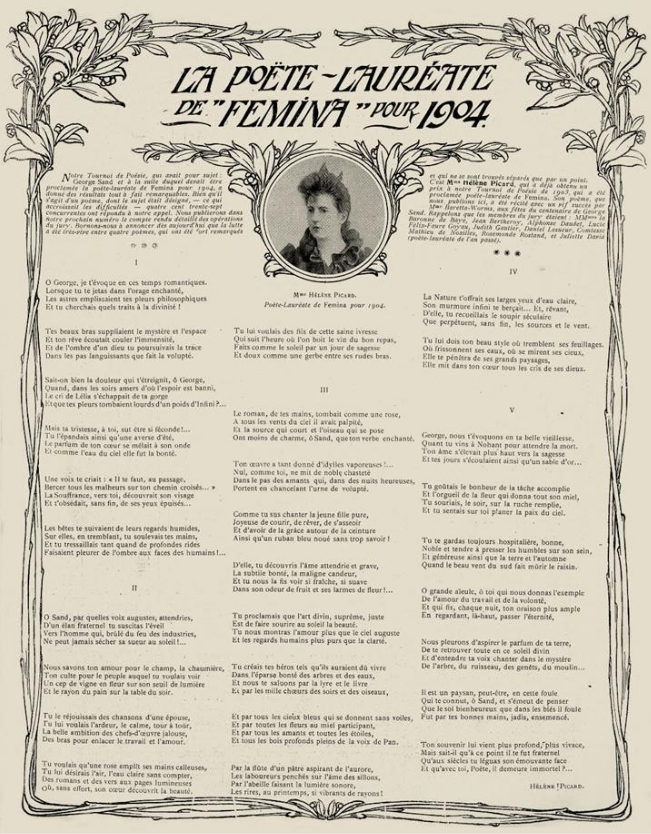
Hélène Picard, "poet-winner of Femina for 1904", had her poem published on the full page of the magazine, with her portrait (Femina, 15 July 1904).

In January 1903, Femina magazine announced the institution of a poetry tournament open to all female readers of the magazine, with the winner sitting on the jury the following year. The first edition of the tournament took place the same year, and Picard figured prominently among the prizewinning poets. She won the tournament in 1904 for her tribute poem to George Sand. Her verses were published full-page in the magazine and recited by Blanche Barretta during the novelist's centenary celebrations. Joining the jury for the 1905 edition, Picard befriended Anna de Noailles and went on to become a leading poet.

==== Success of L'Instant éternel ====
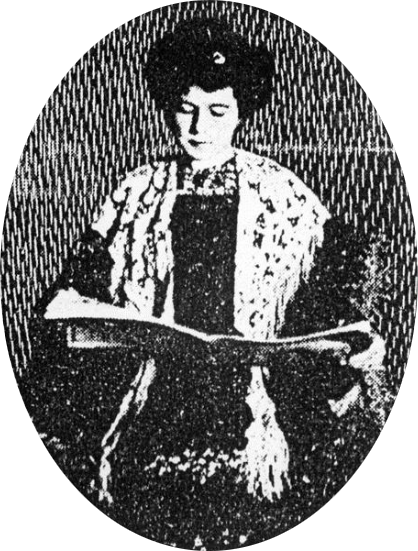
In its issues of 15 March and 15 May 1908, the magazine Je sais tout published a portrait of the poet with a book, symbolizing the recognition of her status as a woman of letters.

The following year, she competed for the Bourse nationale du voyage littéraire, instituted by the French Ministry of Education and the Société des Gens de Lettres, with an unpublished collection entitled L'Instant éternel. In it, she traces the stages of a love affair in six parts, with poems in alexandrines influenced by Musset. Jules Bois wrote in Gil Blas on July 2, 1906: "Femina et La Vie heureuse ne se préparent-elles pas à couronner de billets de mille le front d'un poète? Mme Hélène Picard is the perfect choice". Still in 1906, she tried to win the Prix Archon-Despérouses from the Académie Française; she was again shortlisted, but just missed out, and the prize was finally awarded to Abel Bonnard for Les Familiers.

Having failed to win the prizes she had hoped for, Picard published L'Instant éternel with Sansot, in Paris, in February 1907. The collection received rave reviews and was a great success. Émile Faguet called her "a great poet" and "an extraordinary poetess", and the Italian avant-garde magazine Poesia described her as "imbued with liberation and modernity". She received rave reviews from critics and prominent authors, including Victor Margueritte, Catulle Mendès, Gérard d'Houville, and Fernand Gregh. Picard also won the Prix Archon-Despérouses. 1907 was a pivotal year for "women's literature", a term used by critics at the time to encompass the many female authors publishing during the Belle Époque. Picard stood out as one of the leading figures in this poetic revival, along with Anna de Noailles, Lucie Delarue-Mardrus, Renée Vivien, and Marie Dauguet.

==== Last years in Ardèche ====
The same year, she released a more confidential collection, Petite ville... Beau pays..., published in Privas in a limited edition for her friends. In it, she describes the regional landscapes she saw with her husband. Picard is often referred to as her provincial origins, a sign of her "authenticity" and the "sincerity" of her inspiration in the eyes of Parisian critics. In a collection published in 1908, Fresques, she once again evoked the Ardèche and the simple joys of everyday provincial life, while repressing her desire for a more eventful life. Such desires reappear in the two autobiographical volumes that make up her Souvenirs d'enfance: Nous n'irons plus au bois (1911) and Les Lauriers sont coupés (1913). In them, she expresses her desire for ardor and freedom, in contrast to her simple, monotonous life.

Fresques and Souvenirs d'enfance both went unnoticed, although as the winner of the Femina tournament, Picard remained honored by the magazine - unpublished poems were released in the special issues of December 1, 1908, and 1909, she was chosen as a member of a hypothetical "Académie féminine idéale", a poem in honor of Sarah Bernhardt was commissioned to be recited by the actress Madeleine Roch. She gradually distanced herself from this restricted, bourgeois circle, which no longer matched her literary ambitions. During the war, she published eighteen patriotic poems in Les Annales politiques et littéraires, followed by the collection Rameaux in 1919.

=== Life in Paris (1919 - 1945) ===
==== Friendship with Colette ====
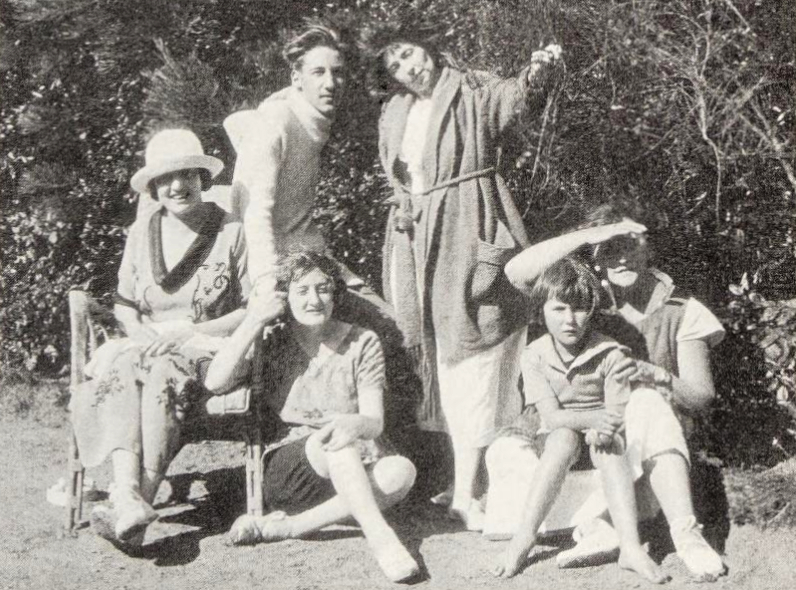
Colette and her friends in Rozven, around 1920. Standing in the background: Bertrand de Jouvenel and Hélène Picard. Seated: Madame Francis Carco, Germaine Beaumont, and Colette with her daughter.

In 1915 or 1919, Picard left her husband, who had begun a new relationship and moved to Paris. The success of L'Instant éternel enabled her to work as a stringer and secretary, and she met Colette, then working at Le Matin. She offered her the second volume of her Souvenirs d'enfance (Childhood Memories), the two women became fast friends, and Colette eventually hired Picard as her secretary. The novelist found her an apartment at 29 Rue d'Alleray, where Picard spent the rest of her life, filling it with objects of curiosity.

Picard seems to have been greatly influenced by Colette, to the point of letting her cut her hair. Her only novel, Sabbat, published in late 1923, was prefaced by Colette and appeared in a collection she edited. From the summer of 1919, Picard accompanied the novelist several times to her secondary villa in Rozven, Brittany, where they were accompanied by Germaine Beaumont, Francis Carco and his wife, Léopold Marchand, and Bertrand de Jouvenel. Picard was often teased for her childish ways, sometimes quite harshly, notably by Carco.

Picard was awarded the Chevalier de la Légion d'Honneur in 1926 for "her poetic work consecrated by the great contemporary critics". However, the literary scene was marked by the blossoming of surrealism, and Picard no longer enjoyed the notoriety of the past. Her inquisitive nature, however, enabled her to turn her attention to new literary trends, and Colette's material and emotional support was a great help. Their correspondence shows Colette's concern for her friend, as well as literary exchanges: the novelist asks the poet for advice, notably on the title of Le Pur et l'Impur, and in return helps her find newspapers in which to publish her poems. Hélène Clément, one of the characters in La Naissance du Jour, appears to have been inspired by Hélène Picard. Picard was one of Colette's main correspondents, along with Marguerite Moreno and Renée Hamon; but unlike them, she would have felt a genuine fascination for Colette, as Marguerite d'Escola wrote to the novelist:

One thing you may never have fully understood is the extent to which you had penetrated her, enlivened her, the extent to which she lived your life.

- Marguerite d'Escola, Letrre à Colette, April 1945

==== Pour un mauvais garçon ====
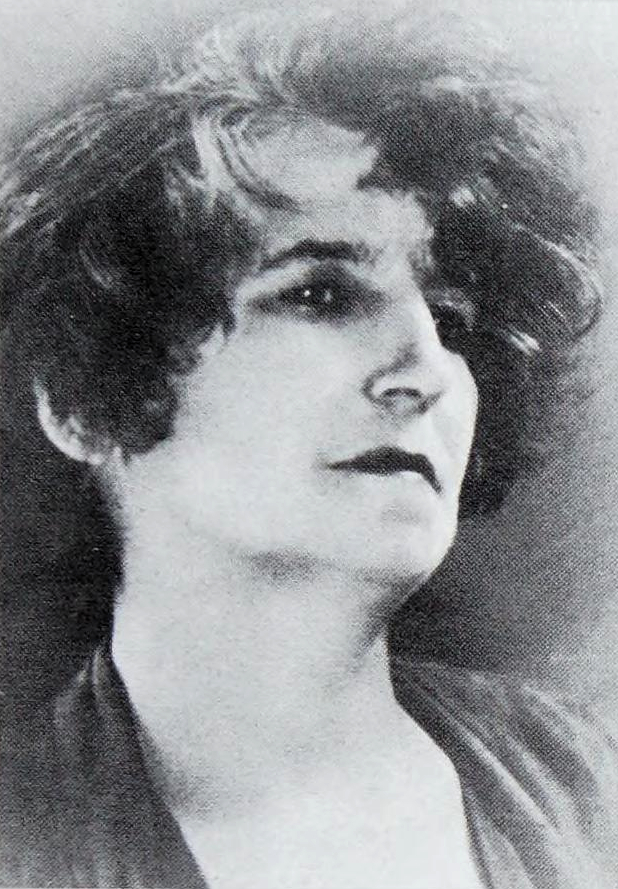
Hélène Picard around 1920.

Shortly after she arrived in Paris, Picard fell in love with a friend of Colette's, Francis Carco, a writer who frequented the underworld and underground bars. This unrequited passion inspired Picard to write his last book, Pour un mauvais garçon, published in 1927. The financial problems of her publisher, Delpeuch, hampered the book's success, but the few reviews it received emphasized its originality. In it, the poet recounts the relationship between a lonely, naive bourgeoise who falls in love with a boy younger than herself, a show-off, a drinker and a liar. Françoise Chandernagor notes the male-female inversion in the relationship, where the man becomes the muse of a virilized female poet. This collection also marks an important evolution in Picard's poetry, as she abandons the alexandrine for uneven, jagged verse, and borrows slang words and popular expressions. Pour un mauvais garçon won the Prix Renaissance in 1928; this prize is awarded annually by the weekly La Renaissance politique et littéraire, at the time presided over by Colette, who worked on behalf of her penniless friend.

=== Death ===
Her passion for Carco seems to have weakened Picard. She sometimes joined Colette in the countryside in the summer and wrote numerous poems on sheets of paper that she mislaid, or used to wrap gifts. However, she was ill since 1926, suffering from rheumatism or "a serious bone lesion". According to Colette, she had to visit the hospital often and spent her last years shut away in her apartment. She suffered from bouts of paranoia that prompted her to install locks on her door, and she wrote to Colette: "I have the intuition, the moral proof, that someone is penetrating my home. [...] If I didn't have so many fibers holding me to this house, I'd leave it; I have proof that someone is spying on me." She became a vegetarian out of an aversion to blood and pretended to be absent when someone knocked on her door. When taken to hospital in January 1945, she is quoted as saying: "If I knew that Colette saw me as I am, I would kill myself". She died in hospital on February 1, 1945, without having the strength to open the pneumatic note sent by Colette. In a letter to Germaine Beaumont dated February 6, 1945, she wrote: "A dreadful end for a poor romantic poet but her solitude was so severely organized that no one could enter."

In the ten days following her death, Colette devoted herself to an article in her honor, which appeared in La Revue de Paris on May 1, 1945, and was later published in L'Étoile Vesper, a collection of memories. The article paints a portrait of the poet Colette admired, and ends with a poem from Pour un mauvais garçon, entitled Délivrance. Colette, it seems, knew verses by heart:

It doesn't reach you, the awful cry of sirens,

In crystal bars, dazzling parrots,

Frivolous favorites of dark captains.

== Posterity ==
During her lifetime, Picard was preoccupied with her posterity, as she wrote to Colette on May 8, 1928: "André Billy, in the literary history he publishes, apparently gives me an extraordinary fate from beyond the grave and announces my eternal fame. [...] I would simply like a little more justice and courtesy during my lifetime. [...] But I hope for some revenge one day: simply the benefit of fairness". Although she fell into oblivion after her death, like many Belle Époque poets, her friendship with Colette meant she was not forgotten. In 2016, Françoise Chandernagor wrote that "we know everything about Colette [...] We know little or nothing about Hélène Picard, her contemporary". Nicole Laval-Turpin defended her thesis on Colette's life and publications at the Université d'Orléans in 2000, but it has not been republished since.

== Perspectives on the work ==
=== Style ===
==== Provincial simplicity... ====
Early in her career, Picard's poems follow a classical form, generally written in alexandrines or other regular versification. Her influences are close to those of other poets: Dante, Petrarch, Ronsard and the Romantics (mainly Victor Hugo, Lamartine, Musset, Desbordes-Valmore, and Chateaubriand). She also dedicated poems to women authors (Élisa Mercœur, Delphine de Girardin, and Loïsa Puget), a rarity among her colleagues. In addition to love, her first collections take as their theme the simplicity of provincial life. For the critics of the time, Picard's style was inseparable from her provincial origins, and her first collections contain poems that praise country life:

In the big city, you can't taste these things,

These dear, sweet moments,

These silences full of insects and roses,

In springtime days.

- Fresques (1908)

The same attraction to the charm of the countryside appears in Petite ville... Beau pays..., in which Picard describes the landscapes of the Ardèche and the banalities of everyday life, the beauty of which she believes is not apparent to most people. In the poem Ma maison, she evokes at length all the warm elements of her personified home:

You have, my house, the lengthening silence,

Like a great glossy cat, its laziness and its paw,

And the noble armchair where Jean meditates,

While the scent of hot coffee bursts forth.

- Petite ville... Beau pays... (1907)

==== ... to an eventful life in Paris ====
Some of her early poems, however, evoke a desire for a more eventful life, which the poet seems to repress. Her style changed markedly after she moved to Paris, as can be seen in her last three books: Province et capucines (1920), Sabbat (1923) and Pour un mauvais garçon (1927). In the first of these, she makes clear her detestation of the province:

You've oppressed me again and again

With your withered smiles,

With your long arms of smoke

And your bat-like eyes

[...]

Ah! I hate you, province,

And I want to proclaim it endlessly.

- Province et capucines (1920)

Sabbat and Pour un mauvais garçon mark a break with her early collections, in terms of both theme and style. The former is a novel of poetic prose in which the narrator, a young witch, recounts her relationship with poetic creation:

Let my frightful, ridiculous imagery pervert abulic adolescents, who feed their rebellious anemia with vinegar, and priests, who in the unbridled sadism of Catholic fears already believe themselves skewered by my fairground theater demons because they sometimes have fire under their cassocks. - Sabbat (1923)

According to Françoise Chandernagor, "her passion for Carco renewed her way of writing: a more syncopated rhythm, dialogues, ruptures, apostrophes, exclamations, recourse to slang and popular expressions" and her sexpression of love, which Alphonse Séché described in 1908 as "bold", became "immodest" according to Chandernagor. It is no longer set in the countryside, but in modern city life, in bistros where absinthe is served and dark alleys where prostitutes wait:

Cinemas. Autos. Phonos. Clowns... and even a misfortune:

A woman dismissed by a sudden gesture.

But you! With what chic you follow this pain

That sign, blue hell, sets ablaze.

A drunkard laughs, all blue,

At the reflections of siphons, tiles full of rain.

- Pour un mauvais garçon (1927)

According to Nicole Laval-Turpin, her early texts bear the romantic and classical imprint of Belle Époque poetry, but Pour un mauvais garçon is truly original and shows her curiosity for new literary trends.

=== Themes ===
==== Love and eroticism ====
In 1912, Picard wrote to Alphonse Séché that her "literary ideal is to express the great sentiments that make the human heart beat" and that "art must be without modesty, that is, without reticence, without timidity, that it must not sacrifice to an opinion, to a petty social formula". From her earliest collections, Picard evoked her amorous desires with a sensual and sometimes erotic dimension - which led Émile Faguet to describe her as a "poet of love and desire":

Ô vous le dévêtu, vous le nu, je vous vois [...]

O young body of joy where splendor flows

I will glorify you in the wave of wheat [...]

O young flower of life, O pure and sacred flesh.

- L'Instant éternel (1907)

Suffering from my whiteness, from my side, from being a woman to the point of moaning.

To the point of moaning.

- Fresques (1908)

In L'Instant éternel, she makes numerous references to famous literary couples: Lucifer and Éloa, Alphonse de Lamartine and Elvire, Petrarch, and Laure de Sade. Jean de Gourmont and Françoise Chandernagor point to a form of man-woman inversion in some of the poems, where her beloved is comparable to "a kind of Beatrix-man" according to Gourmont, and where she frankly praises her lover's body. Colette quotes two verses, which she describes as "dark, sensual and reticent":

Tu ne quittas plus les hontes triomphales That night, my old carnal demon invented.

==== Loneliness and melancholy ====
Picard's last years were clouded by depression and isolation. In 1910, Jean de Gourmont noted the melancholy and regret in some of her poems and considered that "for her, perfect adaptation to life is impossible", citing her ode À la mort, where she calls on death to come and take her before old age overwhelms her. He also emphasizes her unfulfilled idealism:

It's too much to fall asleep without being consoled,

To be beautiful in all the brilliance of your mirror,

To feel so serious, and suddenly so mad

And so tender that you come to despair.

Ah, yes, it's too cruel to die of one's soul,

And of one's life and heavy-blooded veins,

It's too bitter, oh voluptuous, to be a woman,

A true woman with flanks and love.

- L'Instant éternel (1907)

In his review of L'Instant éternel, Émile Faguet notes that the collection - subtitled Poème au singulier - can be divided into three parts, the first and second evoking love dreamt and experienced, then the last expressing the melancholy and anxiety induced by love. For Colette, who describes the total solitude in which Picard spent the end of her life, her other collections are also imbued with a sad, "Baudelairian" atmosphere.

== Awards ==
- Poetry prize from the Académie des Jeux floraux de Toulouse, 1899 and 1900.
- Winner of the Femina Poetry Tournament, 1904.
- Archon-Despérouses prize, 1907, for L'Instant éternel.
- Botta prize, 1920, 2,000 F.
- Chevalier de la Légion d'honneur, decree of 22 August 1926.
- Académie prize, 1927, 1,000 F.
- Renaissance prize, 1928, for Pour un mauvais garçon.

== Works ==
- La Feuille morte, Privas, Volle, 1903.
- Petite ville... Beau pays..., Privas, Volle, 1907.
- L'Instant éternel, Paris, Sansot, 1907.
- Les Fresques, Paris, Sansot, 1908.
- Souvenirs d'enfance : Nous n'irons plus au bois, Paris, Sansot, 1911.
- Souvenirs d'enfance : Les Lauriers sont coupés, Paris, Sansot, 1913.
- Le poète et la guerre, 1915, lyrical scene, performed at the Théâtre antique d'Orange.
- Rameaux, Paris, Fayard, 1919.
- Province et capucines, Paris, Sansot, 1920.
- Sabbat (pref. Colette), Ferenczi, 1923.
- Pour un mauvais garçon, André Delpeuch, 1927.

== See also ==
- Marguerite Burnat-Provins
- Marie Dauguet

== Bibliography ==
- Laval-Turpin, Nicole (2000). Vie et œuvre d'un poète, Hélène Picard (1873 - 1945) (in French). Université d'Orléans.
- Laval-Turpin, Nicole (2002). Hélène Picard dans l'ombre bleue de Colette. Cahiers Colette (in French). Ateliers.
- Laval-Turpin, Nicole (2021). Femina et son tournoi des poétesses : simple stratégie médiatique ? Le cas exemplaire d'Hélène Picard (in French). Çédille, revista de estudios franceses.
- Colette (1945). Pour Hélène Picard (in French). La Revue de Paris.
- Chandernagor, Françoise (2016). Quand les femmes parlent d'amour : une anthologie de la poésie féminine (in French). Cherche Midi. ISBN 978-2-7491-5253-0.
- Davray, Raoul; Rigal, Henry (1908). Anthologie des poètes du Midi (in French). Société d'éditions littéraires et artistiques.
- Faguet, Émile (1908). La Revue Latine (in French). Société d'Imprimerie et de Librairie.
- Girard, L. (1913). "Hélène Picard". Le jardin poétique du Vivarais : anthologie des poètes locaux de l'Ardèche (in French).
- Gourmont, Jean (1910). "Hélène Picard". Muses d'aujourd'hui. Mercure de France.
- Le Guennec, François (2013). "Hélène Picard". Le Livre des femmes de lettres oubliées (in French). Mon petit éditeur. ISBN 978-2-342-00467-0.
- Moulin, Jeanine (1963). La poésie féminine. Époque moderne (in French). Seghers.
- Séché, Alphonse (1908). "Hélène Picard". Les muses françaises (in French). Louis-Michaud.
- Walch, Gérard (1924). "Hélène Picard". Poètes nouveaux (in French). Delagrave.
- Wilwerth, Evelyne (1987). Visages de la littérature féminine (in French). Mardaga. ISBN 978-2-87009-321-4.
- Bona, Dominique (2017). Colette et les siennes (in French). Grasset. ISBN 978-2-246-81286-9.
- Chalon, Jean (1998). Colette : l'éternelle apprentie (in French). Flammarion. ISBN 978-2-08-067553-8.
- Colette (1988). Lettres à Hélène Picard, à Marguerite Moreno, au Petit Corsaire (in French). Flammarion. ISBN 978-2-08-066213-2.
- Barasc, Katy (1984). "Le monde des amies : Marguerite Moreno, Hélène Picard, Renée Hamon". L'Album-Masques / Colette (in French).
- Michineau, Stéphanie (2008). L'Autofiction dans l'œuvre de Colette (in French). Publibook. ISBN 978-2-7483-4344-1.
- Izquierdo, Patricia (2009). "Devenir poétesse à la belle époque (1900-1914)". Clio. Femmes, Genre, Histoire (in French) (36). L'Harmattan. doi:10.4000/clio.10906.
