= Georges Balandier =

French sociologist

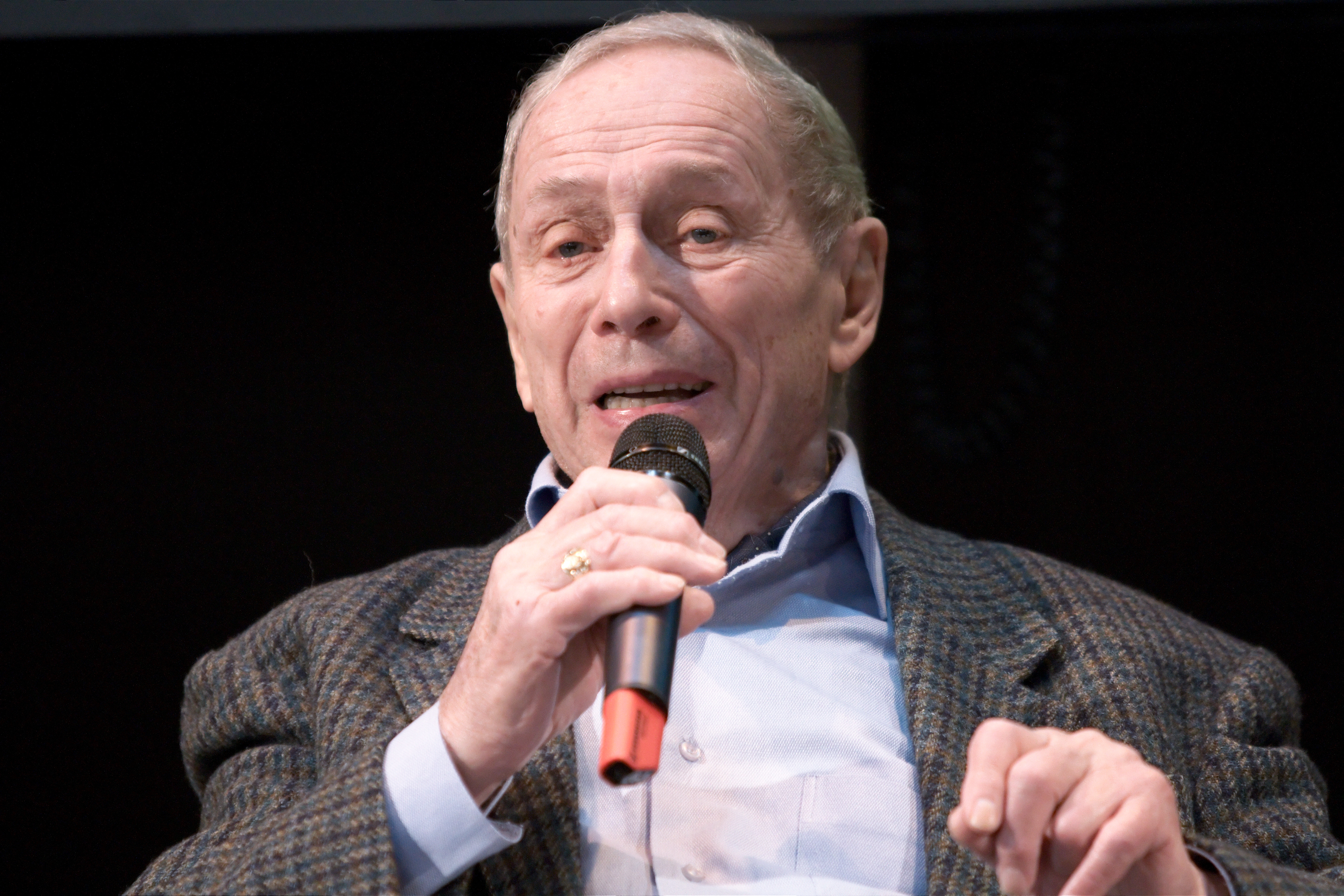
Georges Balandier in March 2010

Georges Balandier (21 December 1920 – 5 October 2016) was a French sociologist, anthropologist and ethnologist noted for his research on Sub-Saharan Africa. Balandier was born in Aillevillers-et-Lyaumont. He was a professor at the Sorbonne (Université René Descartes, Paris-V), and is a member of the center for African Studies (Centre d'études africaines [Ceaf]), a research center of the École pratique des hautes études (School for Advanced Studies in the Social Sciences). He held for many years the Editorship of Cahiers Internationaux de Sociologie (previously held by his mentor Georges Gurvitch) and edited the series Sociologie d'Aujourd'hui at Presses Universitaires de France. He was elected to the American Philosophical Society in 1976. He died on 5 October 2016 at the age of 95.

== Bibliography ==
- 2009, Le dépaysement contemporain : L’Immédiat et l'essentiel, Paris, PUF, 216 p.
- 2008, Fenêtres sur un nouvel âge 2006–2007, Paris, Fayard (Collection Documents), 287 p.
- 2006 (3e éd. revue et augmentée) Le pouvoir sur scène, Paris, Fayard, 172 p. Trad. brésilienne, espagnole, roumaine, portugaise, japonaise avec édition de poche (2000).
- 2005 Civilisation et Puissance, Paris, L'Aube
- 2005 Le Grand dérangement, Paris, PUF, 119 p. Trad. arabe.
- 2005 (2è éd.) Civilisations et puissance. Changement d’époque, L’Aube / Poche essai, 2004, 46 p.
- 2004 (4ème éd PUF « Quadrige ») Sens et puissance. Les dynamiques sociales, PUF, 1971, 334 p., Trad. anglaise, espagnole, italienne, portugaise, japonaise.
- 2003 Civilisés, dit-on, Paris, PUF, 399 p.
- 2001 Le Grand système, Paris, Fayard, 274 p.
- 2000 avec Leonardo Cremonini, En connivence, Milan, Electa
- 1999 (5e éd.), Anthropologie politique, Paris, PUF « Quadrige » (Le Sociologue, 12), 237 p., Trad. anglaise, américaine, espagnole, portugaise, italienne, allemande, suédoise, grecque, japonaise, arabe, persane, serbe, croate, roumaine, coréenne, albanaise, tchèque, russe, ukrainienne, Argentine.
- 1997 Conjugaisons, Paris, Fayard, 411 p.
- 1996 Une anthropologie des moments critiques, Paris, EHESS; AR, 1996 (vidéo et texte).
- 1994 Le Dédale. Pour en finir avec le XXème siècle, Paris, Éd. Fayard, 1994, 236 p. Trad. italienne, brésilienne, portugaise.
- 1992 (5ème éd) Sociologie actuelle de l’Afrique Noire. Dynamique des changements sociaux en Afrique centrale, Paris, PUF, 1955, XII-511 p. (Bibliothèque de Sociologie contemporaine). Trad. anglaise, américaine, italienne, allemande.
- 1992 (5ème éd.) Afrique ambiguë, Paris, Plon (Terre humaine Pocket), 293 p. Trad. anglaise, américaine, allemande, japonaise, italienne, espagnole, portugaise.
- 1992 (2ème éd.) La vie quotidienne au royaume du Kongo du XVIe au XVIIIe siècle, Paris, Hachette (La vie quotidienne), 286 p. Trad. anglaise, américaine, italienne, polonaise.
- 1988 Le désordre : Éloge du mouvement, Paris, Fayard, 252 p. Trad. espagnole, italienne, portugaise, brésilienne.
- 1985 Le détour : pouvoir et modernité, Paris, Fayard
- 1985 (2è éd. revue et augmentée) Sociologie des Brazzavilles noires, Paris, Armand Colin; Presses de la FNSP, 1955, 274 p. (Cahiers de la Fondation nationale des Sciences politiques, 67), 316 p.
- 1981 Autour de Georges Balandier, Paris, Fondation d'Hautvillers.
- 1977 Histoire d'Autres, Paris, Stock, 319 p.
- 1974 (3ème éd.) Anthropo-logiques, Paris, PUF, repris ensuite et augmenté en Livre de poche « Biblio-essais ». Trad. italienne, brésilienne, portugaise. Cet ouvrage montre bien les constructions sociales des inégalités à partir des différences de sexe, d'âge et d'activité sociale ou de groupe familial.
- 1972 Georges Gurvitch, sa vie, son œuvre, Pairs, PUF, 120 p. Trad. anglaise.
- 1961 Les pays en voie de développement : analyse sociologique et politique, Paris, Les Cours de Droit, 312 p. (IEP, 1960–1961).
- 1959 Les pays «sous-développés» : aspects et perspectives, Paris, Les Cours de Droit, 286 p., multigr. (IEP, 1958–1959).
- 1955 L’anthropologie appliquée aux problèmes des pays sous-développés, Paris, Les Cours de Droit, 1955, 375 p. (IEP, 1954–1955).
- 1954 Conséquences sociales de l’industrialisation et problèmes urbains en Afrique : étude bibliographique, Paris, Bureau international de recherche sur les implications sociales du progrès technique, 1954, 77 p.
- 1952 Particularisme et évolution : Les pêcheurs lébou du Sénégal, avec Paul Mercier, Saint-Louis, Institut français d’Afrique Noire, 1952, 216 p. (Études sénégalaises, 3).
- 1952 Les villages gabonais : aspects démographiques, économiques, sociologiques Projets de modernisation, avec J.C. Pauvert, Brazzaville, Institut d’études centrafricaines, 1952, 90 p. (Mémoires de l’IEC, 5).
- 1951 Aspects psychologiques et problèmes actuels de l’Afrique Noire, Paris, Centre d’études asiatiques et africaines, 1951, 117 p.
- 1947 Tous comptes faits, Éd. du Pavois (Le Chemin de la vie), 236 p.
