= Marc Lafargue =

Character related to Arts in France

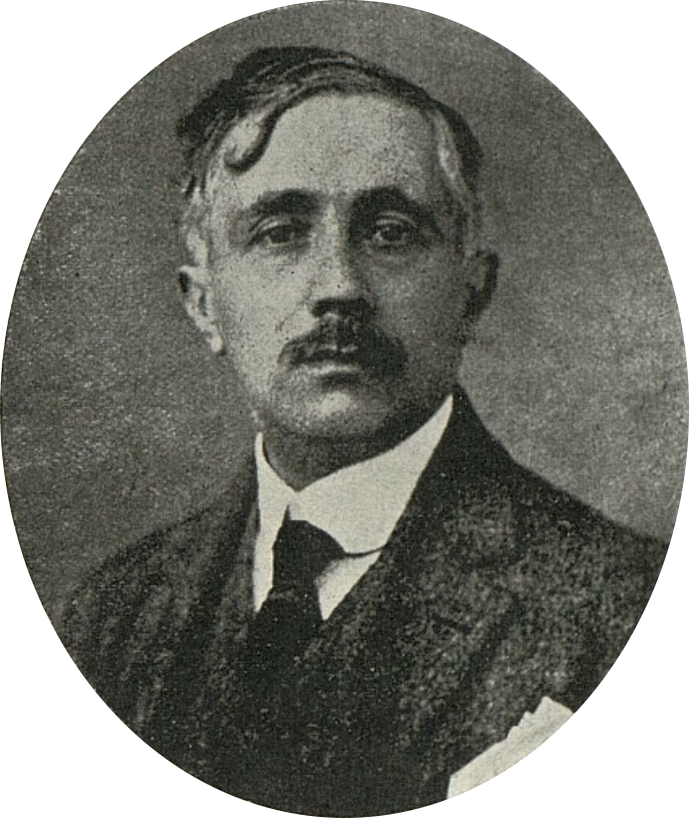
- Born: 15 May 1876; Toulouse
- Died: 7 May 1927 (aged 50); Toulouse
- Occupations: Painter, poet
- Notable work: Le Jardin d'où l'on voit la Vie (1897) L' ge d'or (1903) La Belle Journée (1922) Les Plaisirs et les Regrets (1928)

Signature
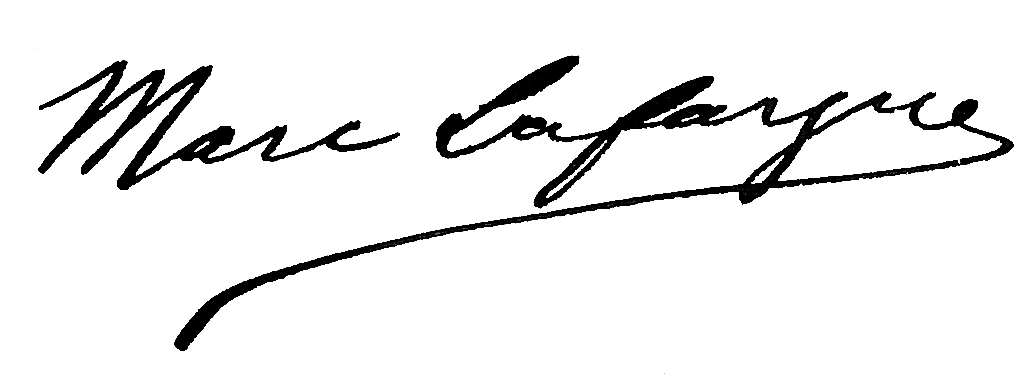

Marc Lafargue (May 15, 1876 – May 7, 1927) was a French poet, art critic, and painter.

While still a high school student, Lafargue was an active member of a group of young poets in Toulouse and published his first collection in 1897, titled "Le Jardin d'où l'on voit la Vie" (The Garden from Which One Sees Life), containing poems influenced by symbolism and the style of Verlaine. He also demonstrated a strong attachment to his native region, which he depicted in several poems. In 1903, he embarked on a long journey to Provence, where he met various artists, including Aristide Maillol, with whom he developed a lasting friendship.

A second collection, "L'âge d'or" (The Golden Age), was published in 1903, marking a departure from his earlier influences towards a style closer to the emerging literary naturism. Despite his fondness for rustic life in the countryside, Lafargue alternated between extended stays in Toulouse and Paris, where he pursued a career as an art critic and contributed to numerous newspapers. He rarely published poetry thereafter, focusing instead on self-taught painting, which he also pursued discreetly. Encouraged by his friends, Lafargue eventually published a new book in 1922, "La Belle Journée" (The Beautiful Day), a collection of poems written nearly 15 years earlier. He composed an ode inspired by Ronsard in 1924 and published a biography of Camille Corot in 1925, followed by a translation of Virgil's "Bucolics" in 1926.

In 1926, he permanently left Paris to care for his ailing mother and sister in Toulouse. Despite obtaining a position as a librarian, he suffered the loss of both his mother and his wife, who also had fragile health, within a few days of each other. Stricken by these bereavements and afflicted with heart problems, he died on May 7, 1927. Lafargue's death was extensively mourned in Toulouse's literary circles, where significant tributes were paid to him. His friends endeavored to publish his numerous unpublished poems and discovered many of his paintings, which he had kept secret. A posthumous collection, "Les Plaisirs et les Regrets" (Pleasures and Regrets), was published in 1928, accompanied by exhibitions of his drawings and paintings. A monument was finally erected in his honor in the square of the Musée des Augustins in 1936.

Described as a modest artist indifferent to fame, Lafargue participated in only one competition during his career and retained many of his works for himself. There is little scholarship on his work, primarily focusing on his paintings, the exact chronology of which remains unknown. While his early poems were somewhat melancholic, they already displayed his enduring attachment to nature, a theme present throughout his subsequent collections. His style evolved over the years, achieving a simple form influenced by classical poets such as Ronsard, whom he honored in his ode.

Additionally, Lafargue was a staunch advocate for the heritage of his hometown, Toulouse, inspiring several poems. In the press, he publicly opposed urban development projects that threatened ancient monuments, successfully rallying public opinion and preserving landmarks such as the Hôtel Dahus.

== Biography ==
=== Early life (1876–1892) ===
Marie Jean Eugène Lafargue, known as Marc, was born on May 15, 1876, at 62 Rue de la Pomme in Toulouse. He was the son of Victor François Mamert Lafargue, a tailor, and Jeanne Aimée Satgé. His origins are primarily known through a document he wrote himself, preserved in the municipal library of Toulouse: he hailed from a bourgeois family whose ancestors amassed wealth in the textile industry. He spent his childhood in a country house owned by his maternal family for over a century at 22 Route de Saint-Simon, near the village of the same name. He had an older sister, Louise, to whom he remained deeply attached throughout his life. His father died when he was still very young, and he was doted on by his mother and sister. Described as a child who "cried at the slightest hint of annoyance," he became a melancholic and highly sensitive adolescent. A priest taught him Latin and encouraged him to sit for his baccalaureate. He became a student at the Toulouse boys' high school, where he befriended Maurice Magre, Jean Viollis, and Henri Jacoubet, who became his first literary companions, along with Emmanuel Delbousquet, whom he met around the same time.

=== L'Effort Group (1892–1899) ===
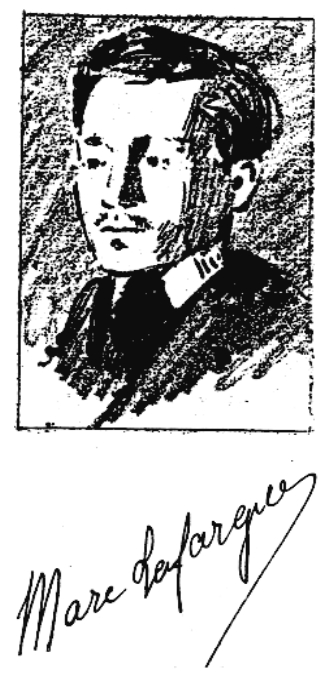
A portrait of Lafargue appeared in the magazine Essais de Jeunes.

Lafargue and his friends gathered for evenings where they read their poems, discussed new literary trends, and launched a magazine founded by Delbousquet in 1892: "Essais de Jeunes" (Youth Essays), quickly replaced by "L'Effort". Lafargue became one of the main contributors to these two magazines, active between 1892 and 1898, which brought together young poets from Toulouse in a group nicknamed the "Toulouse School", and which included Armand Praviel, Hélène Picard, Jacques and Marie Nervat, Joseph Rozès de Brousse, and Pierre Fons. Initially associated with symbolism, they turned to naturism and were also fervent advocates of regionalism and literary decentralization at a time when the artistic scene was dominated by Paris. Lafargue notably contributed to the recognition of the young Toulouse poet Éphraïm Mikhaël, who died prematurely, and led a support committee for the erection of a monument in his honor.

During this time, Lafargue was influenced by classical poets and symbolism, as well as the emerging naturism, which attracted young poets. The poems he published in "Essais de Jeunes" and then in "L'Effort" were compiled into a collection edited by "L'Effort" in 1897, titled "Le Jardin d'où l'on voit la Vie" (The Garden from Which One Sees Life). He depicted his youth and convalescent periods in verses sometimes reminiscent of Verlaine or Baudelaire, as well as memories.

Unlike several of his peers, Lafargue did not compete in the Academy of Floral Games and showed aversion to academies and schools.

"L'Effort" eventually disappeared as its founders moved to Paris. Lafargue relocated there to study at the School of Charters, where he enrolled in 1899 on the recommendation of José-Maria de Heredia. However, he only stayed for a year and returned to Toulouse without a degree, attempting to cure chest pains.

=== Journey to Provence (1903) ===
Back in Toulouse, Lafargue often receives his poet friends, including Delbousquet, Viollis, Déodat de Séverac, and Joseph Bosc. His health improves, and he undertakes a journey to Provence in 1903, accompanied by Joachim Gasquet. He meets several artists during this trip: Charles Maurras in Martigues, Frédéric Mistral in Maillane, Émile Pouvillon in Lamothe-Capdeville, and Aristide Maillol, still unknown but with whom he becomes friends, in Banyuls. He matures his taste for rustic life and the cult of the native soil in contact with these regional personalities. Still in 1903, he publishes the collection "L'âge d'or" where he evokes his mother and sister, his native region and its landscapes, as well as his idyll with his future wife, Lydie Gabrielle Vayssié:

"Her gaze is deep as water in the woods.

You will love her upon hearing her sweet voice.

Her soul is pure as the air of the countryside.

Mother, don't you want her to be my companion?"

— L'âge d'or

They marry in Paris on December 23, 1904. She is described as "a very simple girl from Quercy, who admires him like a god", with fragile health and a penchant for rustic life like him.

=== Between Toulouse and Paris (1904–1926) ===
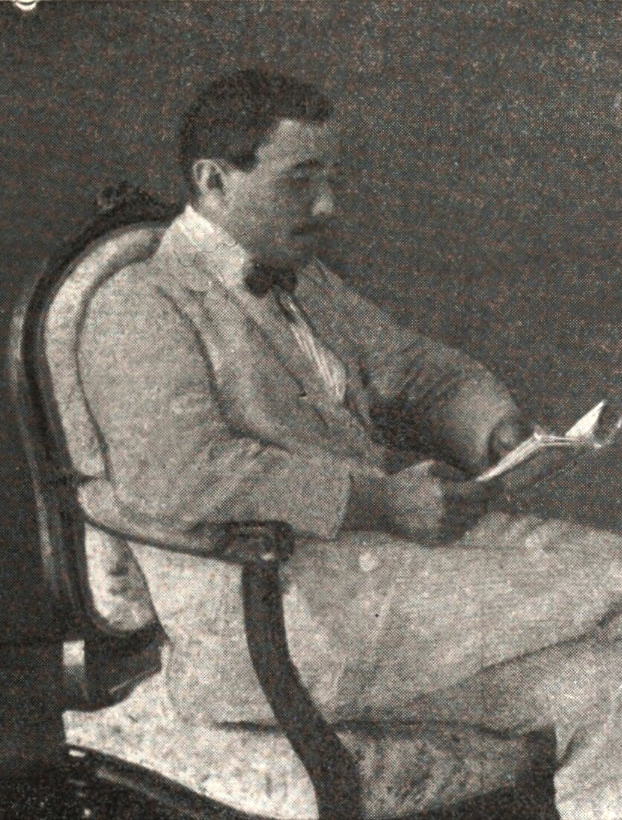
Marc Lafargue, 1925.

For several years, the couple alternates between stays in Toulouse and Paris, where Lafargue mainly pursues a career in the press: he collaborates, among others, with L'Ermitage (alongside Marie Dauguet, Charles Guérin, or Léo Larguier), La Muse française, and Les Marges (which includes Apollinaire among its writers), and participates in the founding of La Nouvelle Revue Française in 1908. From 1909 to 1911, he frequents the restaurant of La Mère Coconnier, rue Lepic in Montmartre, where he meets Apollinaire, Viollis, Émile Vuillermoz, and Eugène Montfort. He also continues to write for Toulouse and regional magazines, such as Le Pays de France, where he publishes "Social Notes" with a socialist and Dreyfusard tendency. He visits his friend Aristide Maillol in the Canigou massif, a region that inspires him a series of poems that he does not immediately publish. He also indulges in painting, exhibiting some paintings at the Salon des Indépendants in 1908 and at other Parisian exhibitions, but does not pursue a career as a painter.

Lafargue is not mobilized during World War I due to his fragile health, and settles in Toulouse during the conflict. He then resumes his regular stays in Paris until 1926.

Alongside his literary criticism activity, he also publishes some poems in the press between 1903 and 1922 — notably La Minerve and Le Mercure de France — but does not publish a collection. His friends encourage him to publish his poems, and he eventually publishes in 1922 "La Belle Journée," a collection of poems written at Maillol's place nearly 15 years earlier. He then resumes his author activity. He composes an "Ode to the Young Girls of Vendôme" in 1924 for a contest, which he wins with the support of Pierre de Nolhac. His publications continue: he has his Ode published in 1924, then a biography of Camille Corot in 1925, and a verse translation of Virgil's Bucolics, illustrated by Aristide Maillol, in 1926.

=== Settlement in Toulouse and death (1926–1927) ===
In 1926, Lafargue permanently leaves Paris to join his sick mother and sister in Toulouse. He moves in with them, into his childhood home in Saint-Simon, with his wife, who is also in poor health. Thanks to Pol Neveux, he obtains a position as assistant librarian at the municipal library of Toulouse in October 1926. There, he inventories prints and engravings preserved in old books and is described as "punctual and methodical" by Neveux.

But in the same year, he loses his wife and mother within a few days of each other. Deeply affected by these losses, Lafargue experiences anxieties and then heart problems. He dies on May 7, 1927. He is buried in the Terre-Cabade cemetery, as he had already expressed in a poem in 1903:

"One day, when my sons have closed my eyes,

It is on this hill with its harmonious folds

That I want, O my mortal body, for you to rest,

At the foot of the black cypresses under the bushes of roses."

== Legacy ==
His death is extensively covered by the regional press, and several newspapers dedicate special issues to the poet, recalling his life and works. His friends gather his unpublished poems to publish them in a collection titled "Les Plaisirs et les Regrets" in 1928. Most also discover his paintings, about which he did not speak, as Pol Neveux writes: "He only painted for his joy, fiercely refusing to show his canvases or watercolors to anyone, even to his intimates". Some drawings are exhibited in April 1928, for one Sunday, at the Toulouse Museum of Toulouse, then a retrospective exhibition of his work is set up by the Southern Artists Society in 1931. The same year, unpublished poems and drawings are published in the Vallespir magazine.

In 1934, a committee chaired by Pol Neveux is created with the aim of erecting a monument in memory of Lafargue in a public garden in Toulouse. This monument, created by Henry Parayre, is finally inaugurated on May 7, 1936, in the square of the Augustins museum. It depicts a nude woman, a favorite subject of the sculptor — heavily influenced by Maillol, whom he met through Lafargue — with a medallion portrait of the poet. The tribute ceremony spans two days and includes a conference at the Faculty of Letters of Toulouse, a banquet, and numerous speeches. The contribution of Louise, the poet's sister, who became the guardian of his work, is often commented on by members of the committee. Although Lafargue supported and encouraged young poets from the beginning and some presented themselves as his disciples at his death, Pol Neveux, director of the committee, insists on his lack of interest in recognition:

"I believe that no poet was ever more modest, more indifferent to the mirages of glory [...] the ode or the elegy barely finished, he relegated it to his drawers where an inexpressible disorder reigned. Without the constraint of his friends, perhaps he would never have published anything after L'âge d'or."

Marc Saint-Saëns depicts him in his fresco representing the Occitan Parnassus, in the main reading room of the Library of Study and Heritage of Toulouse. Since 1961, the municipal library of Toulouse has preserved a collection of manuscripts of L'âge d'or as well as 337 volumes that belonged to the poet. Another set of manuscripts — containing correspondence, notebooks, poems, and personal documents — is acquired in 1992, and its addition to the collections "is dictated by the local renown of this Toulouse poet, the singer of his city and his country".

== Works ==
=== Poetic works ===
Lafargue publishes few collections: "Le Jardin d'où l'on voit la Vie" in 1897, "L'âge d'or" in 1903, and "La Belle Journée" in 1922, then his friends publish a posthumous collection derived from his unpublished poems, "Les Plaisirs et les Regrets". His work also includes poems published in the press, an "Ode aux jeunes filles de Vendôme" composed for a competition in 1924, as well as a translation of Virgil's "Bucolics".

"Le Jardin d'où l'on voit la Vie" contains his early youth poems, written while he is still in high school. He evokes his childhood in nostalgic verses influenced by Verlaine and symbolism, but also shows his attachment to nature, which will be a constant in his work:

"On the chilly sunset flees a flight of passage

The evening has the sweetness of dying November

And clothes a troubled landscape in a vapor

The silver of a star shines through the veil of the pond."

— "Le Jardin d'où l'on voit la Vie" (1897)

His second collection, "L'âge d'or," contains more refined poems closer to naturism. Armand Praviel sees influences from Jean Racine, Charles Maurras, and Jean Moréas's "Stances", in poems that describe family life and the landscapes of the poet's native region. For Henri Jacoubet, "there is more certainty in the abandon of Jammes than in that of Lafargue". His style continues to simplify, and his classical influences — Ronsard, André Chénier — become stronger in "La Belle Journée," a collection written in 1908 but not published until 1922. He evokes his simple life in the countryside, joy, and love:

"Take your big hat of flowers!

Your eyes of astonished child

In the shadow have more sweetness.

Hurry up. If you linger,

I will not be happy.

I only want you to adorn yourself

With sunlight and wind!"

— "La belle journée" (1924)

He shows strong influence from Ronsard in his later poems and pays tribute to him in his "Ode aux jeunes filles de Vendôme" so that they go reciting Ronsard on the banks of the Loir, the only poem he composed for a competition. He shows from the beginning a strong detachment from literary schools and indifference to competitions, in which some of his comrades participate. Several critics also highlight the influence of Virgil, whose "Bucolics" he translates in a luxury edition illustrated by Aristide Maillol.

"Les Plaisirs et les Regrets," a posthumous collection published in 1928, contains poems from the end of his life where he notably evokes the anguish of death.

=== Painted works ===
Lafargue is also a self-taught painter, but he exhibits very little publicly, and painting is a lesser-known aspect of his work. He exhibits a few canvases in Parisian exhibitions, notably at the Salon des Indépendants in 1908, but keeps his works almost secret towards the end of his life. He keeps hundreds of drawings in his house in Saint-Simon and hangs a few canvases there for decoration, but he is so discreet about this passion that even his friends do not know about it. Paul Mesplé, one of his friends and a member of the committee founded in his memory, however, considers that "there is an obvious parallelism between Lafargue's painted work and his poetic work. In both, equal sincerity, the same concern to express the impulses of a life passionate heart that is thrilled by the magnificence of nature, the charm of gardens, the beauty of women".

The chronology of his works is confusing. Mesplé compares his style to Pierre Bonnard, Henri Matisse, and Pierre Laprade, noting that his touch is sometimes "awkward". His drawings include copies of masters (Delacroix, Manet, Renoir, Degas, or Ingres). He shows curiosity about other forms of art, notably sculpture, and leaves unfinished books at his death about his friend Aristide Maillol and François Lucas, whom he greatly admires. His sister Louise bequeaths "a very important collection of Marc Lafargue's plastic works" to the Augustins Museum in Toulouse in 1961.

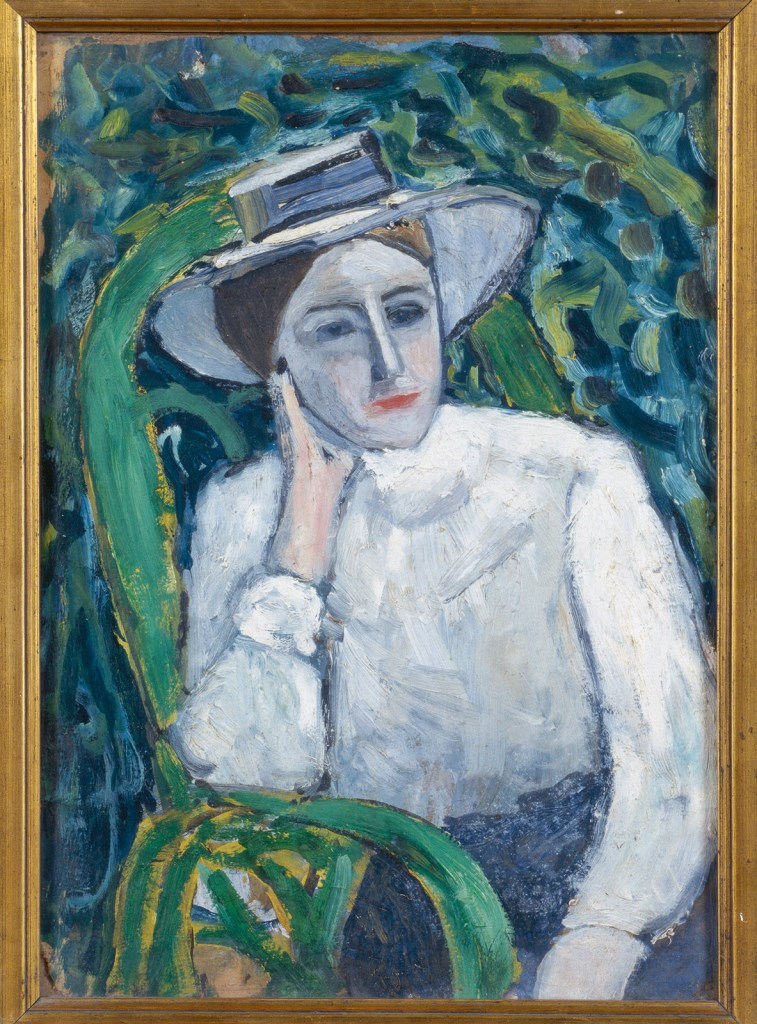
"Portrait of Miss Louise Lafargue," between 1896 and 1927.

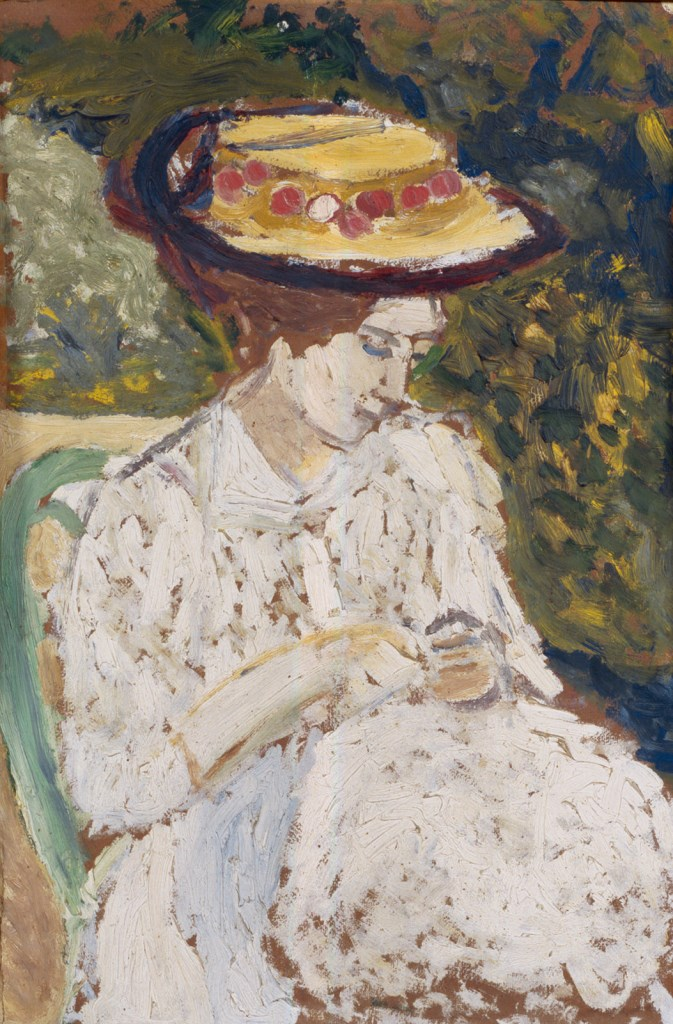
"Miss Louise Lafargue in the Garden," between 1896 and 1927.

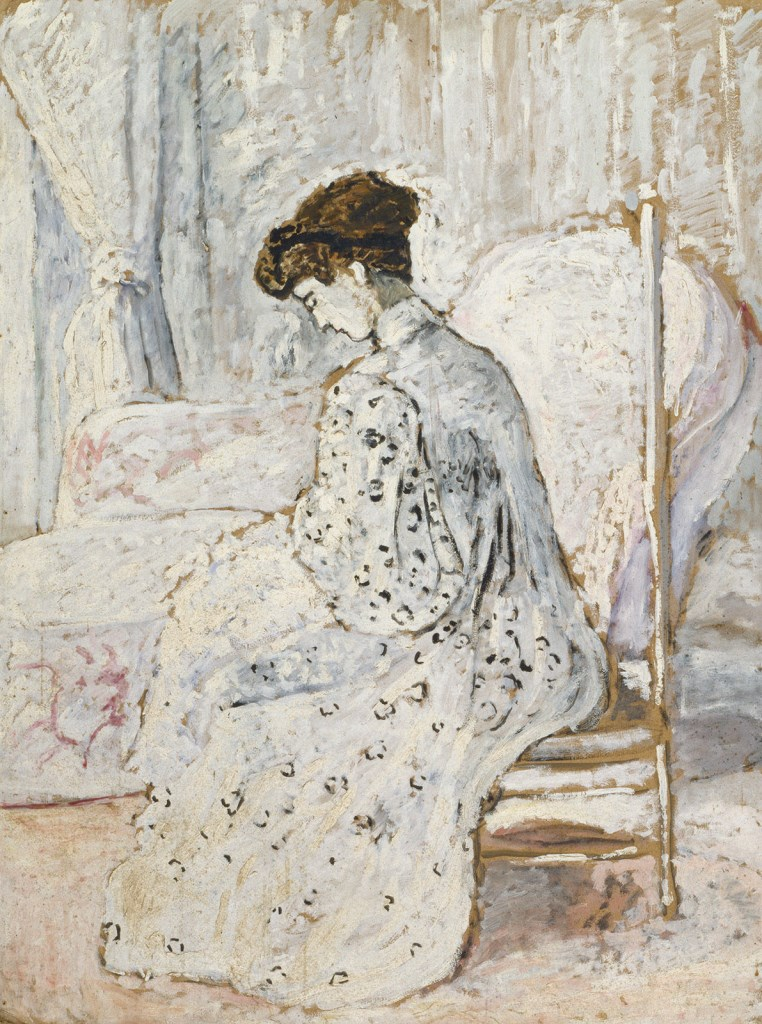
"Lydie Seated, Symphony in White," between 1896 and 1927.

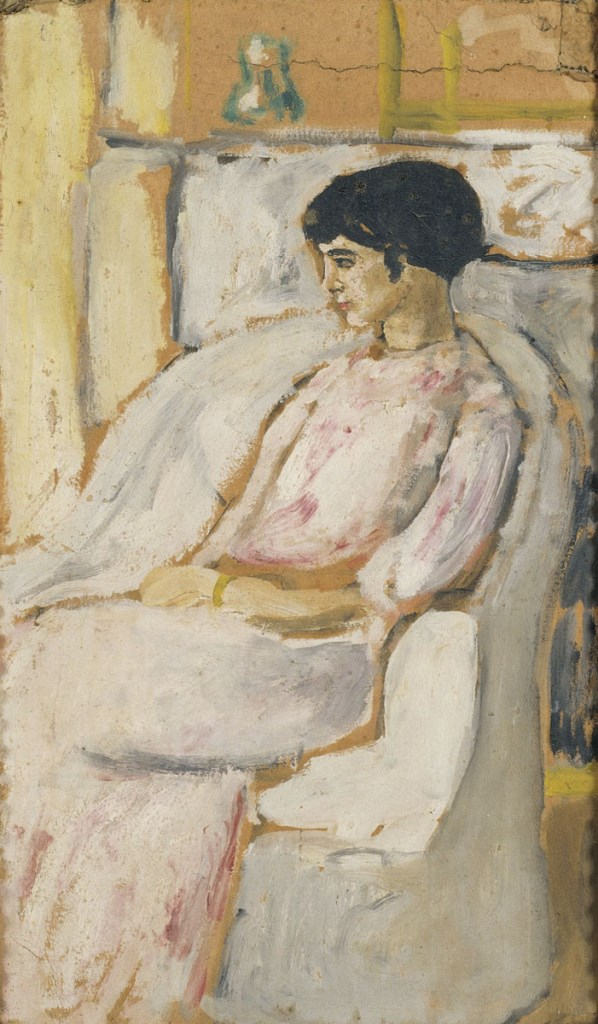
"Lydie Seated in an Armchair," between 1896 and 1927.

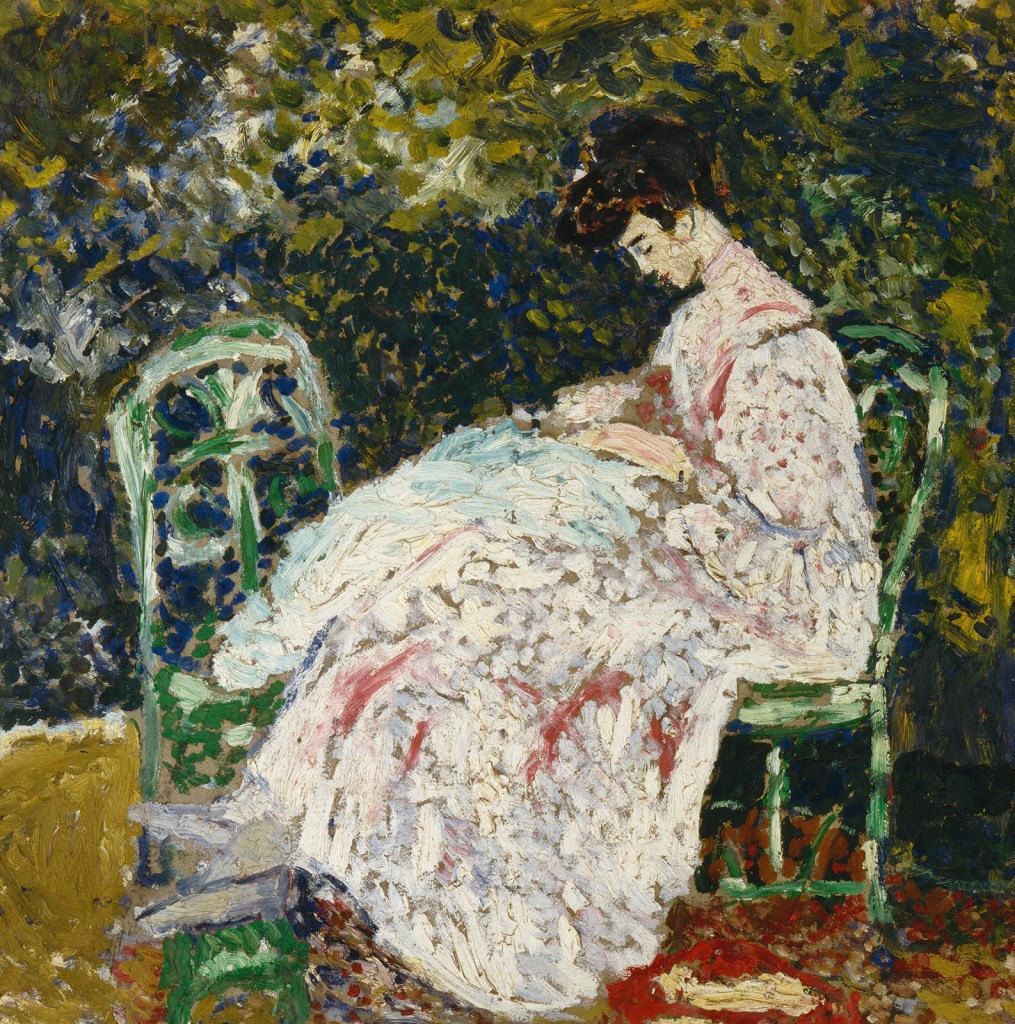
"Woman Sewing in a Garden," between 1896 and 1927.
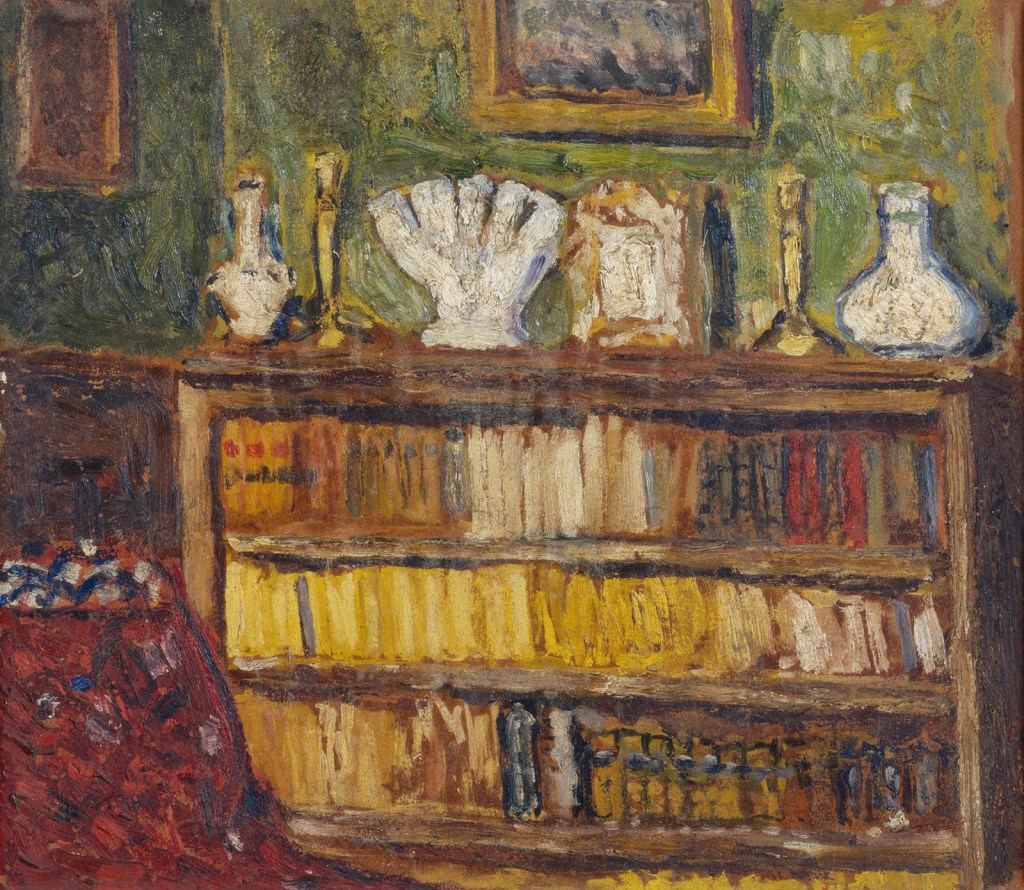
"The Small Library," between 1896 and 1927.

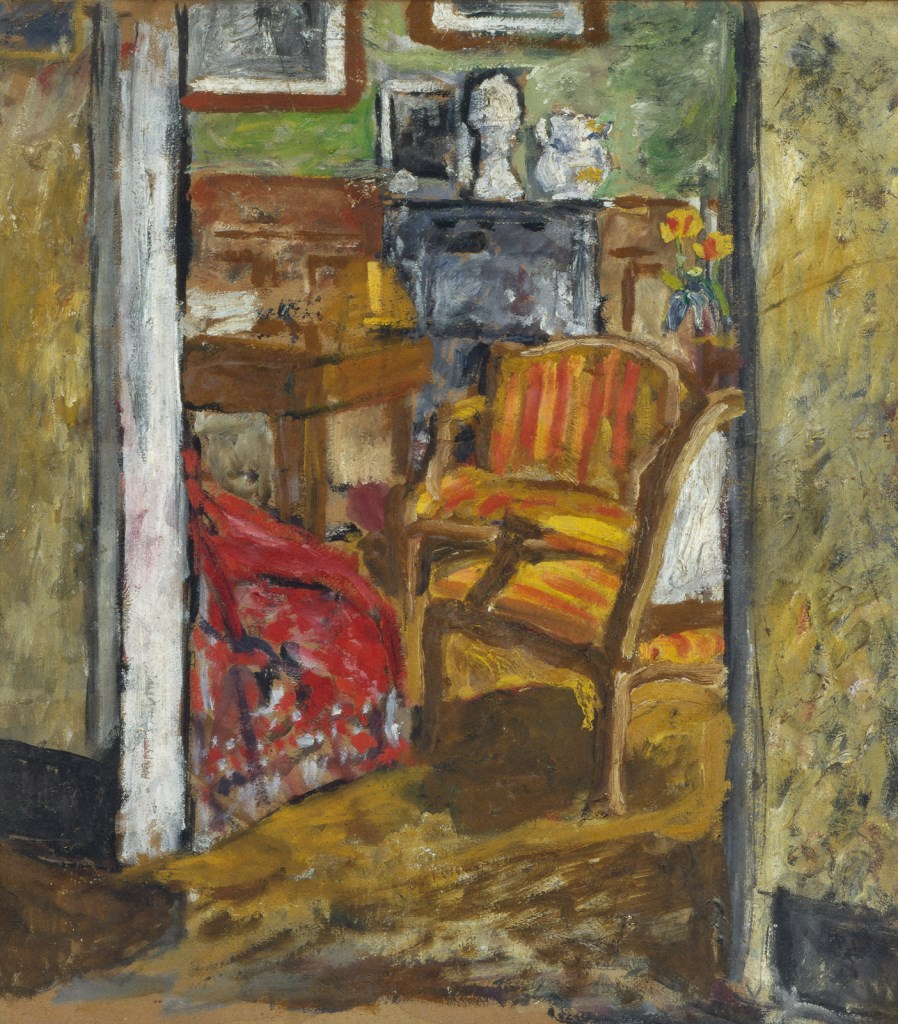
"The Desk with the Yellow Armchair," between 1896 and 1927.

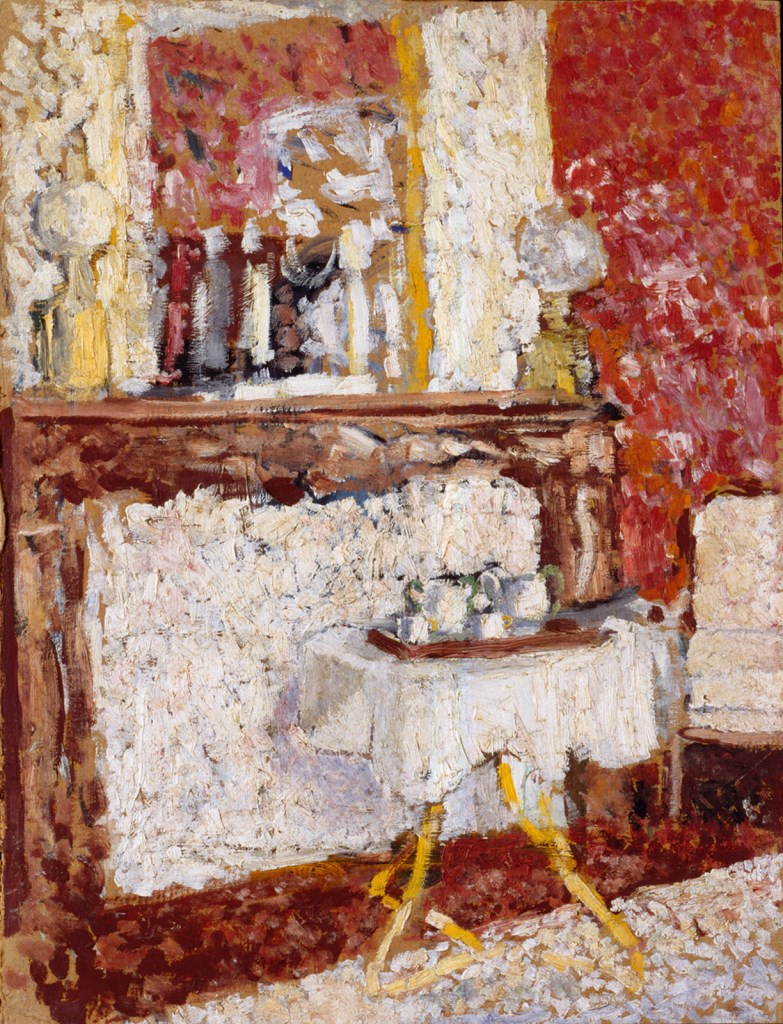
"The Coffee on a White Pedestal Table," between 1896 and 1927.

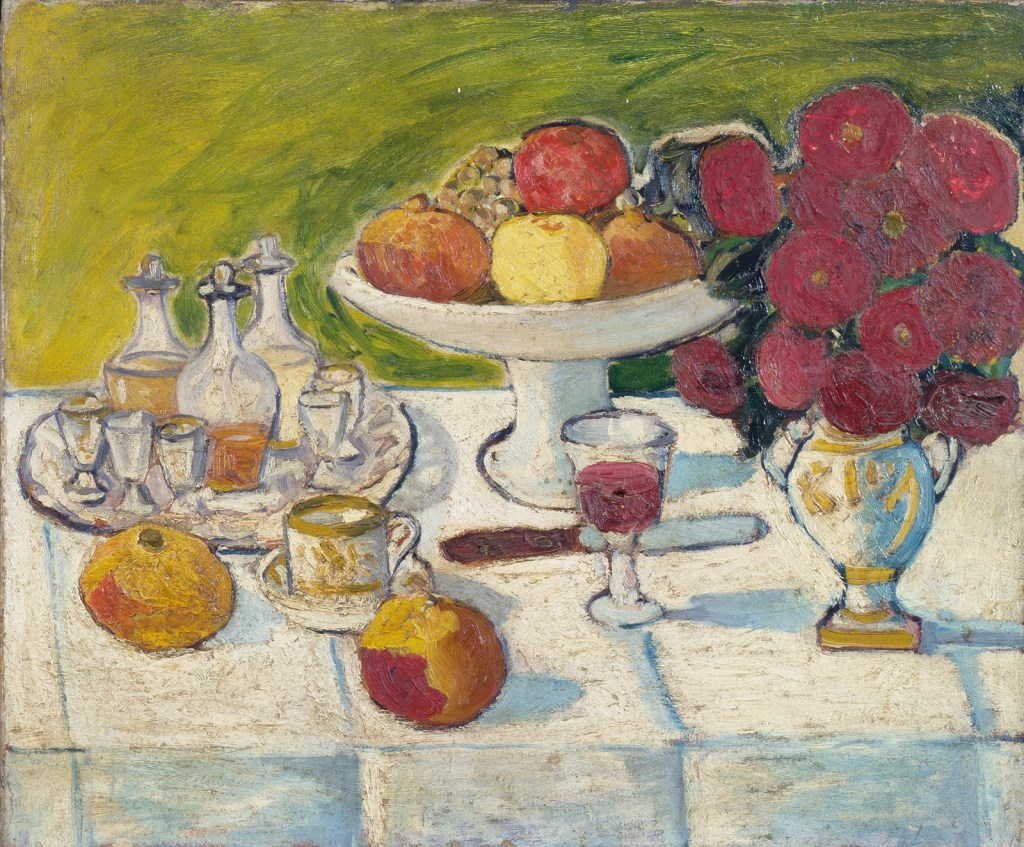
"Still Life with a White Tablecloth," between 1896 and 1927.

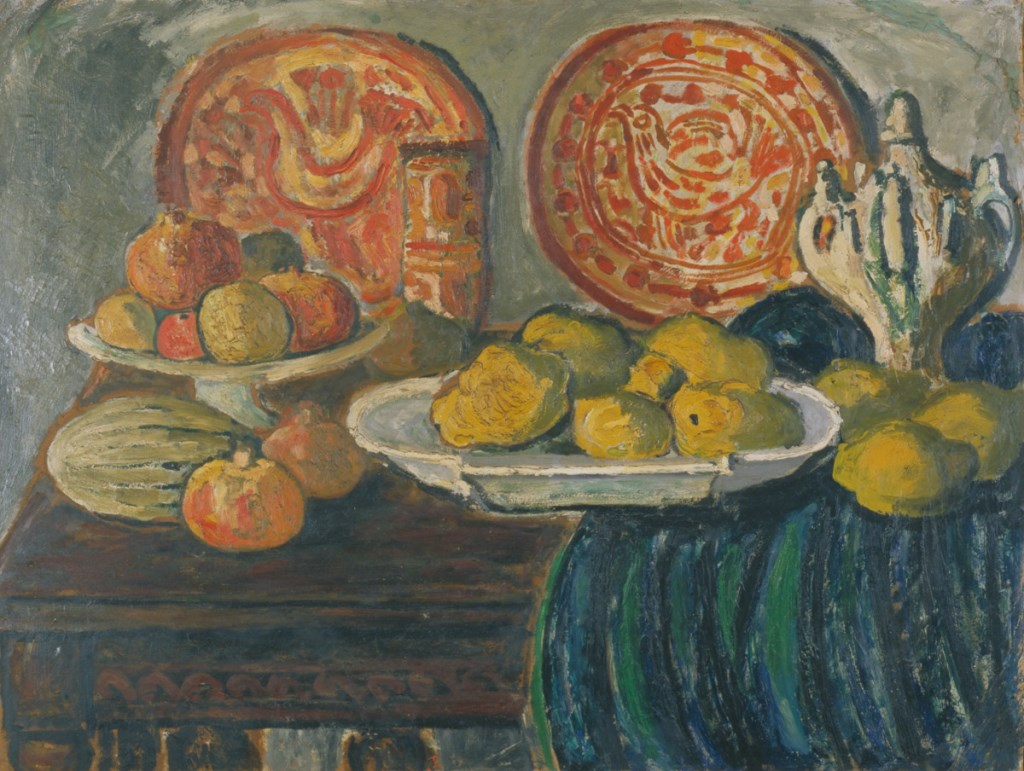
"Still Life with Hispano-Moresque Plates," between 1896 and 1927.

=== A defender of Toulouse's heritage ===
Although he stays for extended periods in Paris, Lafargue remains attached to his native region throughout his life and defends Toulouse's heritage. He devotes several articles, in the regional press, to lengthy descriptions of the city's old quarters. He detests the constructions of the 19th century and writes that Toulouse "could remain a city of art, if one knows how to respect its admirable monuments of the past". He publicly opposes the destruction of certain monuments threatened by urban development projects, mainly the Dahus Hotel, the Pont-Neuf, and military hospitals. His commitment and press articles help stir public opinion and modify certain projects, even leading to the restoration of monuments, such as the Dahus Hotel.

He writes numerous poems about Toulouse, of which he knows every nook and cranny and enjoys showing to his friends with "a genuine, almost childish joy" according to André Magre:

"In the light mists, the city with its golden bricks

With its domes and towers, its pink steeples

Awakens in the dawn, O river, on your bank

Where your waters rest against the brick quays."

== Publications ==
=== Books ===
- "Le Jardin d'où l'on voit la Vie," Toulouse, Bibliothèque de L'Effort, 1897.
- "L'âge d'or," Paris, Mercure de France, 1903.
- "La Belle Journée," Paris, Librairie de France, 1922.
- "Ode aux jeunes filles de Vendôme pour qu'elles aillent récitant Ronsard aux bords du Loir," Paris, L. Rouart et J. Watelin, 1924.
- "Corot," Paris, F. Rieder, coll. "Maîtres de l'Art moderne," 1925.
- "Les Églogues," translation of Virgil (ill. Aristide Maillol), Paris, 1926..
- "Les Plaisirs et les Regrets," Paris, Garnier, 1928.

== See also ==
- Marguerite Burnat-Provins
- Marie Dauguet
- Francis Jammes
- Saint-Georges de Bouhélier

== Bibliography ==
=== Works and articles focused on Marc Lafargue ===
- Chabaneix, Philippe (1976). Le centenaire de Marc Lafargue (in French). Revue des deux mondes.
- Ferran, André (1936). Le souvenir de Marc Lafargue (in French). Bulletin des amitiés franco-étrangères.
- Jacoubet, Henri (1927). Un poète méconnu : Marc Lafargue (in French). La Revue hebdomadaire.
- Mesplé, Paul (1927). Le Toulousain et l'Amateur d'Art (in French). Vol. 3. L'Auta : organe de la société des Toulousains de Toulouse.
- Mesplé, Paul (1936). Catalogue illustré de la XXVIIe exposition et de la rétrospective Marc Lafargue (in French). Société des artistes méridionaux.
- Mesplé, Paul (1942). À travers l'art toulousain, hommes et œuvres (in French). Musée des Augustins.
- Neveux, Pol (1928). Le Souvenir de Marc Lafargue. Champion.
- Neveux, Pol; Allem, Maurice; Magre, André; Praviel, Armand (1936). L'inauguration du monument élevé à la mémoire de Marc Lafargue (in French). À Toulouse : le magazine d'informations de la ville de Toulouse.
- Puget, Henry (1927). Marc Lafargue. Vol. 3. L'Auta : organe de la société des Toulousains de Toulouse.
- Rozès de Brousse, Joseph (1927). Discours prononcé aux obsèques de Marc Lafargue, le 10 mai 1927 (in French). Vol. 3. L'Auta : organe de la société des Toulousains de Toulouse.
- Anonyme (1931). Marc Lafargue. Poèmes et dessins inédits (in French). Vallespir.
- Anonyme (1934). Un monument à Marc Lafargue (in French). La Liberté.

=== More works related ===
- Bisson, Philoxène (1925). Vingt-cinq ans de littérature française (in French). Les revues littéraires.
- Décaudin, Michel (1981). La crise des valeurs symbolistes (in French). Slatkine.
- Perbost, Magali (1996). "Traitement et classement : l'exemple des manuscrits Marc Lafargue et Louise Ouradou". Traitement et mise en valeur des manuscrits contemporains : l'exemple de la bibliothèque municipale de Toulouse (in French). ENSSIB.
- Zytnicki, Colette (1991). Entre l'ambition provinciale et la nécessité parisienne : deux revues poétiques toulousaines, Essais de Jeunes et L'Effort (1892-1898) (in French). Annales du Midi.
