= Francis Jammes =

French poet

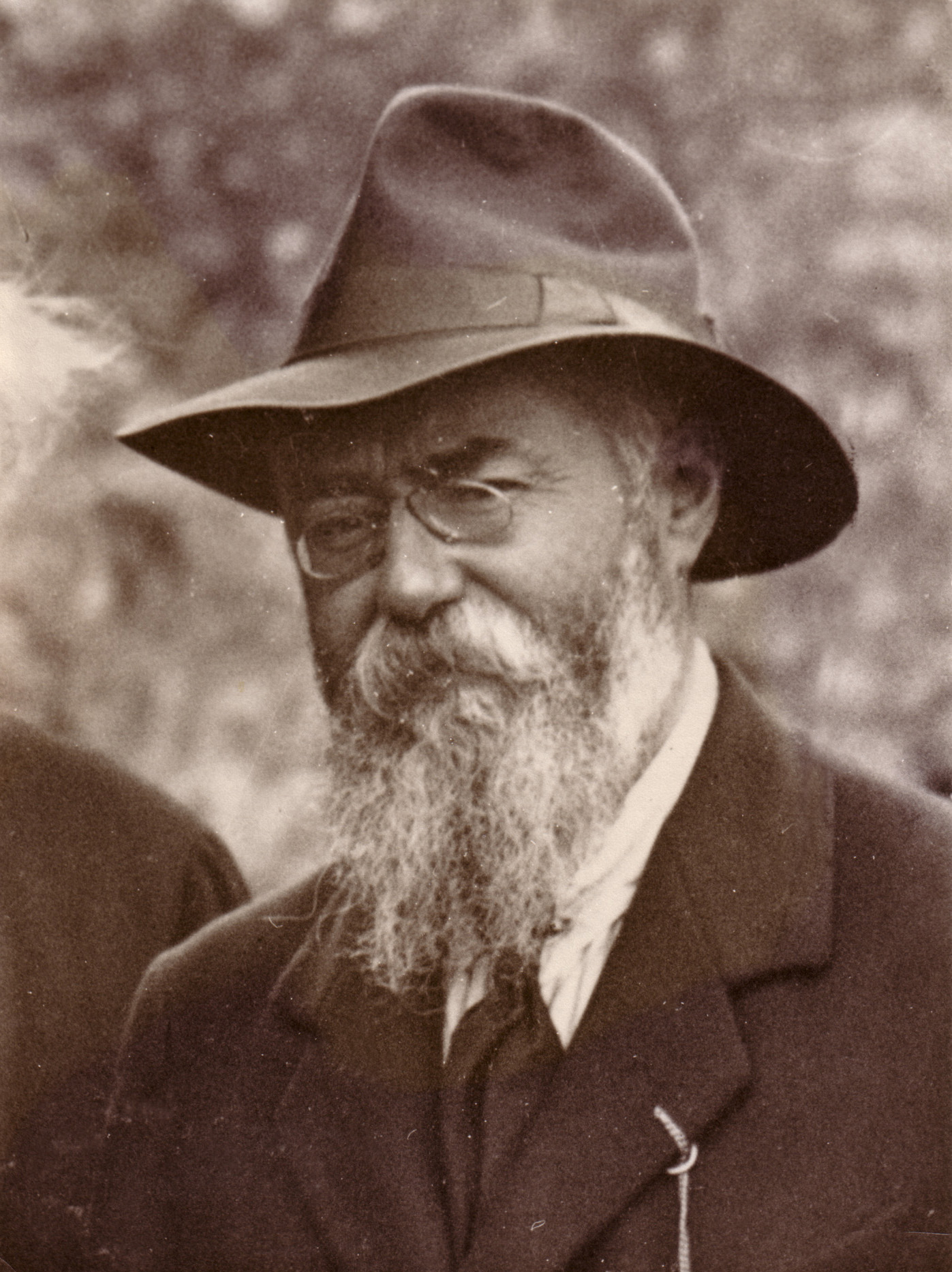
- Jammes in 1917
- Born: December 2, 1868; Tournay, Hautes-Pyrénées, France
- Died: November 1, 1938 (aged 69); Hasparren, Pyrénées-Atlantiques, France
- Occupation: Poet

Francis Jammes (French pronunciation: [fʁɑ̃sis ʒam]; 2 December 1868 – 1 November 1938) was a French poet. He spent most of his life in his native region of Béarn and the Basque Country and his poems are known for their lyricism and for singing the pleasures of a humble country life (donkeys, maidens). His later poetry remained lyrical, but also included a strong religious element brought on by his reversion to Catholicism in 1905.

== Biography ==
Francis Jammes was born on 2 December 1868 in Tournay, Hautes-Pyrénées, Occitania; his parents were Louis-Victor Jammes (1831–1888) and Anna Bellot (1841–1934).

A mediocre student, Jammes failed his baccalauréat with a zero for French. His first poems began to be read in Parisian literary circles around 1895, and were appreciated for a fresh tone breaking away from symbolism.

In 1896 Jammes travelled to Algeria with André Gide. He fraternised with other writers, including Stéphane Mallarmé and Henri de Régnier. His most famous collection of poems — De l'angélus de l'aube à l'angélus du soir ("From morning Angelus to evening Angelus") — appeared in 1897 in the Mercure de France; Le Deuil des Primevères ("The Mourning of Primulas") (1901) was also well received. Working up to that point as a notary's clerk, Jammes was then able to make a living from his writing. In 1905, influenced by the poet Paul Claudel to whom he became close, he converted to a practicing Catholicism. His poetry became more austere and sometimes dogmatic.

In the eyes of Parisian literary circles, Francis Jammes was generally considered a solitary provincial who chose to live a life of retreat in his mountainous Pyrenees, and his poems never became entirely fashionable. The author sought nomination to the Académie française several times, but was never elected.

Jammes was the original author of Georges Brassens's song La Prière ("The Prayer"). The lyrics were taken from the poem Les Mystères douloureux ("The Agonies of Christ") published in the collection L'Église habillée de feuilles ("The Church Clothed in Leaves") (1906); Brassens changed some of the words to make the text more rhythmic.

Jammes was known to have an ardent passion for field sports, especially game hunting. He was known to have also been a believer in the conservation of endangered species.

Thirteen poems from his cycle Tristesses ("Sorrows"), were set to music by composer Lili Boulanger in 1914 under the title Clairières dans le ciel ("Clearings in the Sky") a title Jammes had given to an assorted collection of poetry of which Tristesses was a part. The whole cycle was composed for soprano, flute and piano by Michel Bosc.

He died in Hasparren on 1 November 1938, aged 69.

== Works ==
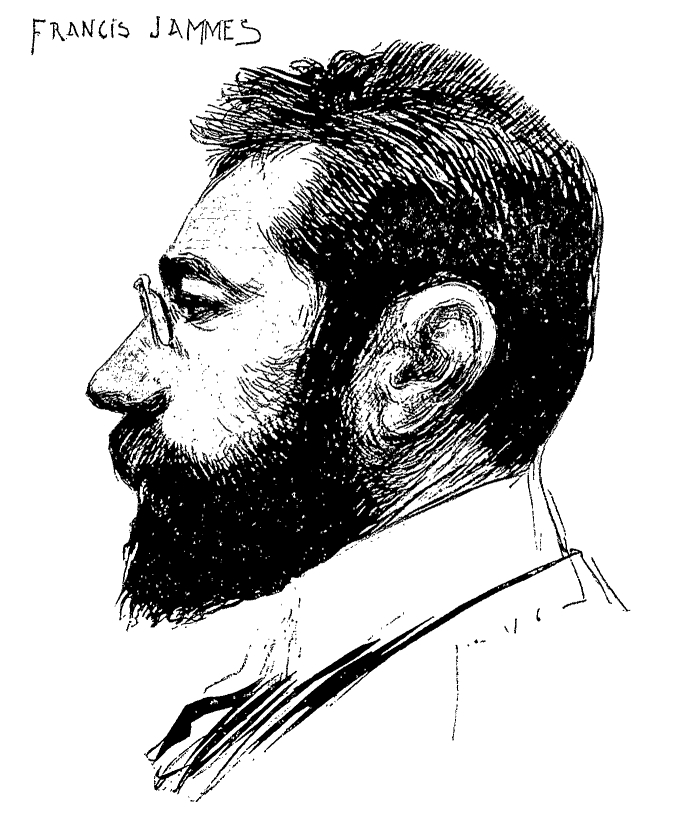
Etching of Jammes by Jean Veber

=== Poetry ===
Each year links to its corresponding "[year] in poetry" article:

- 1891: Six Sonnets^{[a]}
- 1892: Vers,^{[a]} also 1893 and 1894
- 1895: Un jour^{[a]}
- 1897: La Naissance du poète ("The Birth of the Poet")^{[a]}
- 1898: Quatorze prières^{[a]}
- 1898: Works related to De l’Angélus de l’aube à l’Angélus du soir at Wikisource ("From the Morning Prayer to the Evening Prayer")^{[a]}
- 1899: Le Poète et l'oiseau ("The Poet and the Bird")^{[a]}
- 1899: La Jeune Fille nue^{[a]}
- 1900–1901: Le Triomphe de la vie^{[a]}
- 1901: Le Deuil des primevères
- 1902–1906: Clairières dans le ciel^{[a]}
- 1905: Tristesses
- 1906: Clairières dans le Ciel
- 1906: L'Eglise habillée de feuilles^{[a]}
- 1906: Le Triomphe de la vie
- 1908: Poèmes mesurés^{[a]}
- 1908: Rayons de miel, Paris: Bibliothèque de l'Occident^{[a]}
- 1911–1912: Les Géorgiques chrétiennes ("Christian Georgics"), three volumes^{[a]}
- 1913: Feuilles dans le vent^{[a]}
- 1916: Cinq prières pour le temps de la guerre, Paris: Librairie de l'Art catholique^{[a]}
- 1919: La Vierge et les sonnets, Paris: Mercure de France^{[a]}
- 1921: Épitaphes, Paris: Librairie de l'Art catholic^{[a]}
- 1921: Le Tombeau de Jean de la Fontaine, Paris: Mercure de France^{[a]}
- 1922, 1923, 1924, 1925, Livres des quatrains
- 1923: La Brebis égarée^{[a]}
- 1923–1925 Les Quatrains, in four volumes^{[a]}
- 1925: Brindilles pour rallumer la foi, Paris: Éditions Spes^{[a]}
- 1926: Ma France poétique, Paris: Mercure de France^{[a]}
- 1928: Diane^{[a]}
- 1931: L'Arc-en-ciel des amours, Paris: Bloud et Gay^{[a]}
- 1935: Alouette
- 1935: De tout temps à jamais, Paris: Gallimard^{[a]}
- 1936: Sources, Paris: Le Divan^{[a]}
- 1943: Elégies et poésies diverses^{[a]}
- 1946: La Grâce^{[a]}

=== Prose ===
Each year links to its corresponding "[year] in literature" article:

- 1899: Clara d'Ellébeuse; ou, L'Histoire d'une ancienne jeune fille^{[a]}
- 1901: Almaïde d'Etremont; ou, L'Histoire d'une jeune fille passionée^{[a]}
- 1903: Le Roman du lièvre^{[a]}
- 1904: Pomme d'Anis; ou, L'Histoire d'une jeune fille infirme^{[a]}
- 1906: Pensée des jardins^{[a]}
- 1910: Ma fille Bernadette^{[a]}
- 1916: Le Rosaire au soleil, Paris: Mercure de France^{[a]}
- 1918: Monsieur le Curé d'Ozeron^{[a]}
- 1919: Une vierge, Paris: Édouard-Joseph^{[a]}
- 1919: Le Noël de mes enfants, Paris: Édouard-Joseph^{[a]}
- 1919: La Rose à Marie, Paris: Édouard-Joseph^{[a]}
- 1920: Le Poète rustique, Paris: Mercure de France^{[a]}^{[a]}
- 1921: Le Bon Dieu chez les enfants^{[a]}
- 1921: De l'âge divin à l'âge ingrat, the first of three volumes of his memoirs, followed by L'Amour, les muses et la chasse, 1922; Les Caprices du poète, 1923^{[a]}
- 1921: Le Livre de saint Joseph, Paris: Plon-Nourrit^{[a]}
- 1922: Le Poète et l'inspiration, Nîmes, France: Gomès^{[a]}
- 1923: Cloches pour deux mariages, Paris: Mercure de France^{[a]}^{[a]}
- 1925: Les Robinsons basques^{[a]}
- 1926: Trente-six femmes, Paris: Mercure de France^{[a]}
- 1926: Basses-Pyrénées, Paris: Émile-Paul^{[a]}
- 1927: Lavigerie^{[a]}^{[a]}
- 1928: Janot-poète^{[a]}
- 1928: Les Nuits qui me chantent^{[a]}
- 1928: La Divine Douleur^{[a]}
- 1930: Champétreries et méditations^{[a]}
- 1930: Leçons poétiques, Paris: Mercure de France^{[a]}
- 1932: L'Antigyde; ou, Elie de Nacre^{[a]}
- 1934: Le Crucifix du poète, Paris: M. deHartoy^{[a]}
- 1936: Le Pèlerin de Lourdes, Paris: Gallimard^{[a]}
- 1938: La Légende de l'aile; ou, Marie-Elisabeth^{[a]}
- 1941: Saint Louis; ou, L'Esprit de la Croisade, Paris: F. Sorlot^{[a]}

== See also ==
- Marc Lafargue
