= Marie Krysińska =

French poet and musician

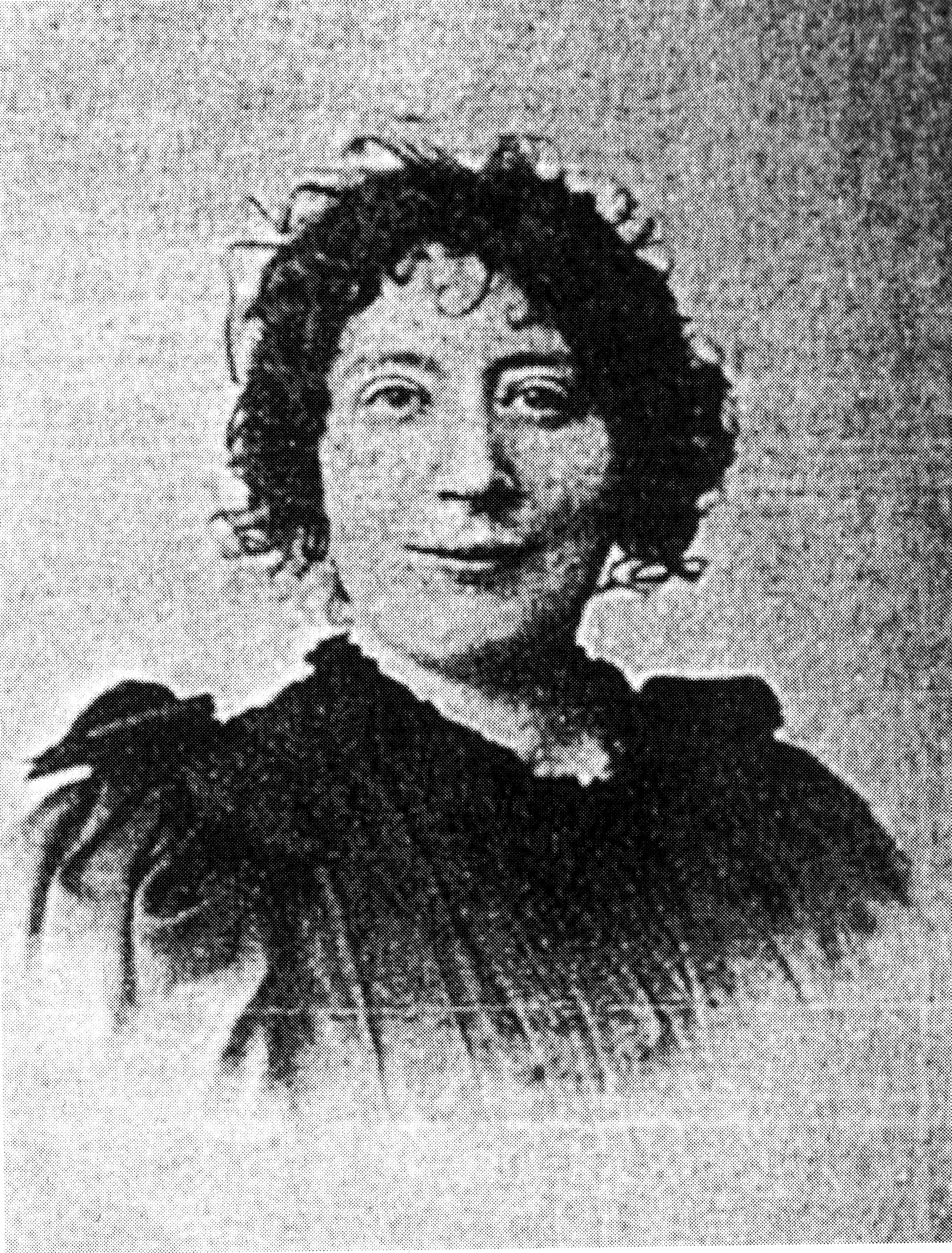
Marie Krysińska

Maria Anastasia Krysińska (Warsaw, 22 January 1857 - Paris, 15 September 1908) was a Polish-French symbolist poet, novelist, and musician.

== Biography ==
Born to a lawyer, Ksawery Jan Teodor Krysiński and his wife Amelia Maria Wołowska, Marie Krysinska left her native Warsaw when she was sixteen to study at the Conservatoire de Paris, however she abandoned her studies shortly after her arrival in Paris to pursue a more bohemian lifestyle.

She became a pianist at the cabaret Le Chat Noir, where she would also recite some of her poetry.

During her time in Paris, Krysinska became an active member of a variety of creative and literary circles of the time, including the "Hirsutes," "Jemenfoutistes," "Zutistes" and "les Hydropathes" of which she was the only female member.

Starting in 1882 she began to publish some of her original work in La revue du Chat noir and La Revue indépendante. In 1890 she published her first collection of poetry, Rythmes pittoresques, followed by a collection of prose pieces, L'Amour chemine in 1892. Two years later she published her second collection of poetry, Joies errantes. She continued to publish even more novels, poems, and articles throughout her life.

She was married to the painter Georges Bellenger (1847–1915), who was well known for his lithographs.

== Free Verse/Vers Libre ==
Although conventionally the innovation of free verse poetry is attributed to other 19th century French poets such as Gustave Kahn and Jules Laforgue, Marie Krysinska actually published free verse poetry in 1882, five years before other volumes featuring free verse poetry would appear in 1887 giving her a more authentic claim to the title 'innovator of free verse'.

== Works ==
- Rythmes pittoresques : mirages, symboles, femmes, contes, résurrections, Lemerre, 1890. Réédition : édition critique établie par Seth Whidden, Exeter, University of Exeter press, 2003 Texte en ligne
- L'Amour chemine, Lemerre, 1892
- Joies errantes : nouveaux rythmes pittoresques, Lemerre, 1894 Texte en ligne
- Intermèdes, nouveaux rythmes pittoresques : pentéliques, guitares lointaines, chansons et légendes, Messein, 1903 Texte en ligne
- La Force du désir, roman, Mercure de France, 1905 Texte en ligne
- Œuvres complètes, dir. Florence Goulesque et Seth Whidden (Honoré Champion, 2022–2026)
  - Section I. POÉSIE. Vol. I: Rythmes pittoresques. Édition par Seth Whidden. Joies errantes. Édition par Yann Frémy (†). ISBN 9782745356895. honorechampion.com
  - Section I. POÉSIE. Vol. II: Intermèdes. Édition par Darci Gardner et Laurent Robert. ISBN 9782745357076. honorechampion.com
  - Section II. ROMANS ET NOUVELLES. VOL. I : L’Amour chemine.. Édition par Florence Goulesque. Nouvelles parues dans la presse. Édition par Wendy Prin-Conti et Francesco Vignoli. Juliette Cordelin. Édition par Gretchen Schultz (ISBN 9782745367020) https://www.honorechampion.com/fr/editions-honore-champion/13633-book-08536702-9782745367020.html
  - Section II. ROMANS ET NOUVELLES. Vol. II: Folle de son corps. Édition par Sharon Larson et Gretchen Schultz. La Force du désir. Édition par Adrianna M. Paliyenko et Ewa M. Wierzbowska ISBN 9782745362575. honorechampion.com

Données BNF
