= Thilda Harlor =

French writer

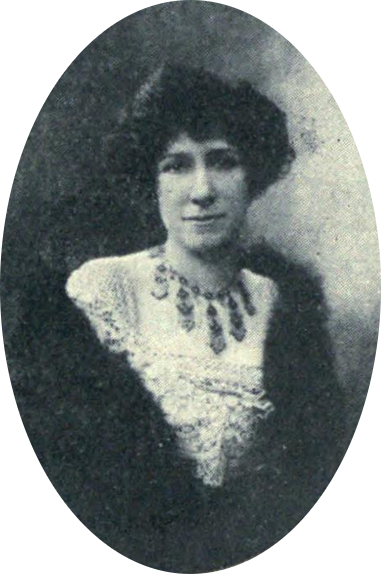
Thilda Harlor in 1920

Thilda Harlor (born Jeanne Fernande Perrot; August 7, 1871, Paris – December 28, 1970) was a French writer, biographer, art critic, feminist journalist and a femme de lettres.

== Life ==
She was the daughter of the chemist Eugène Dominique Perrot (1844–1884) and the women's rights activist and journalist Amélie Hammer (1851–1943), born Amélie Sylvie Ragon. Her father left the family when Jeanne was still a child. Her mother married the violinist and composer Richard Hammer (1828–1907) in 1886. Jeanne received an excellent musical education from her stepfather and became an outstanding pianist. On her mother's side, she is the great-granddaughter of the writer Jean-Marie-Ragon.

In 1895, she met the committed feminist Léopold Lacour (1854–1939), who, although married, became her partner, at a conference of the French League for Women's RightsDie am 16. Founded by Léon Richer and Maria Deraismes on 1 April 1870, the Association pour le droit des femmes is an association that campaigns for women's civil rights. In 1882, Maria Deraismes founded the French League for Women's Rights (Ligue française pour le droit des femmes, LFDF) to demand civil and political rights for women, in which she was active like her mother. In 1897, she became a journalist and signed her articles with the pseudonym Harlor, which was made up of three letters of the name Hammer and three letters of the name Lacour, her two spiritual fathers. Sometimes she added the exotic-sounding first name Thilda.

She began her journalistic career at the feminist magazine La Fronde, founded by Marguerite Durand (where she headed the Fine Arts section) and wrote for the Journal des femmes and the Revue socialiste, among others. In 1901, she took part in the founding of the Conseil national des femmes françaises (National Council of French Women). In 1904, she fell out with the Société nationale des beaux-arts because it had no women on its committees. In 1917, she criticized the pacifists and supported the war effort. From Marguerite Durand's death in 1936 until 1945, she was director of the Bibliothèque Marguerite-Durand.

As a writer, she published novels and biographies, e.g. about her partner Léopold Lacour and the working-class poet Gabriel Gauny. Her first book, Le Triomphe des vaincus (The Triumph of the Defeated), was published in 1908 in Barcelona and Paris. In 1930 she received the Prix George Sand Die Académie française verlieh ihr 1931 den Prix d'Académie for Arielle, fille des champs (Arielle, Girl of the Country), in 1944 the Prix Georges Dupau and in 1960 the Prix Valentine-de-Wolmar for her complete works.

She died on December 28, 1970, at her home at 63 Boulevard Saint-Michel in Paris. Her autobiographical manuscript Mes chemins (1944–1945) was only made accessible to the public at her request on the 30th anniversary of her death in 2000. It is kept by the Bibliothèque Marguerite-Durand.
