= Marguerite Burnat-Provins =

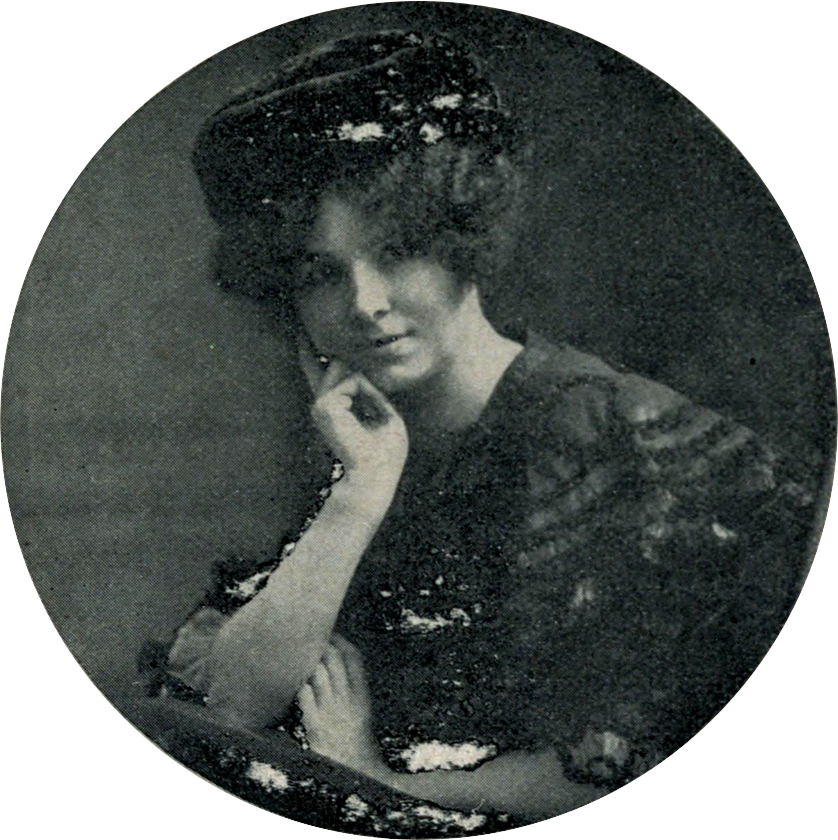
- Born: 26 June 1872; Arras, Artois, France
- Died: 20 November 1952 (aged 80); Grasse, Provence, France: Swiss

Marguerite Burnat-Provins (June 26, 1872, Arras - November 20, 1952, Grasse) was a French and Swiss writer and painter.

== Biography ==
Burnat-Provins was the oldest of seven children born in a middle-class family. Her father encouraged her artistic talents and she left Arras for Paris in 1891 to study at a number of schools with art-focused curricula as École des Beaux-Arts did not admit women at the time.

She moved from Paris to the Swiss village of Vevey when she married the Swiss architect Adolphe Burnat-Provins. Vevey became the setting of many of her early works. She wrote constantly for a period of twenty years and then more sporadically later in life. During this time she was prolific watercolor painter; many of her works, along with poems and original editions of her books, were destroyed or stolen during World War I.

Her work was noted for its sensuality. Two of her books, Le Livre pour toi (1908) and Cantique d'été (1910), focused on the nude male body, using language that male poets had historically used to describe female nudes for centuries.

== See also ==
- Marc Lafargue
