= Aillevillers-et-Lyaumont =

- Commune
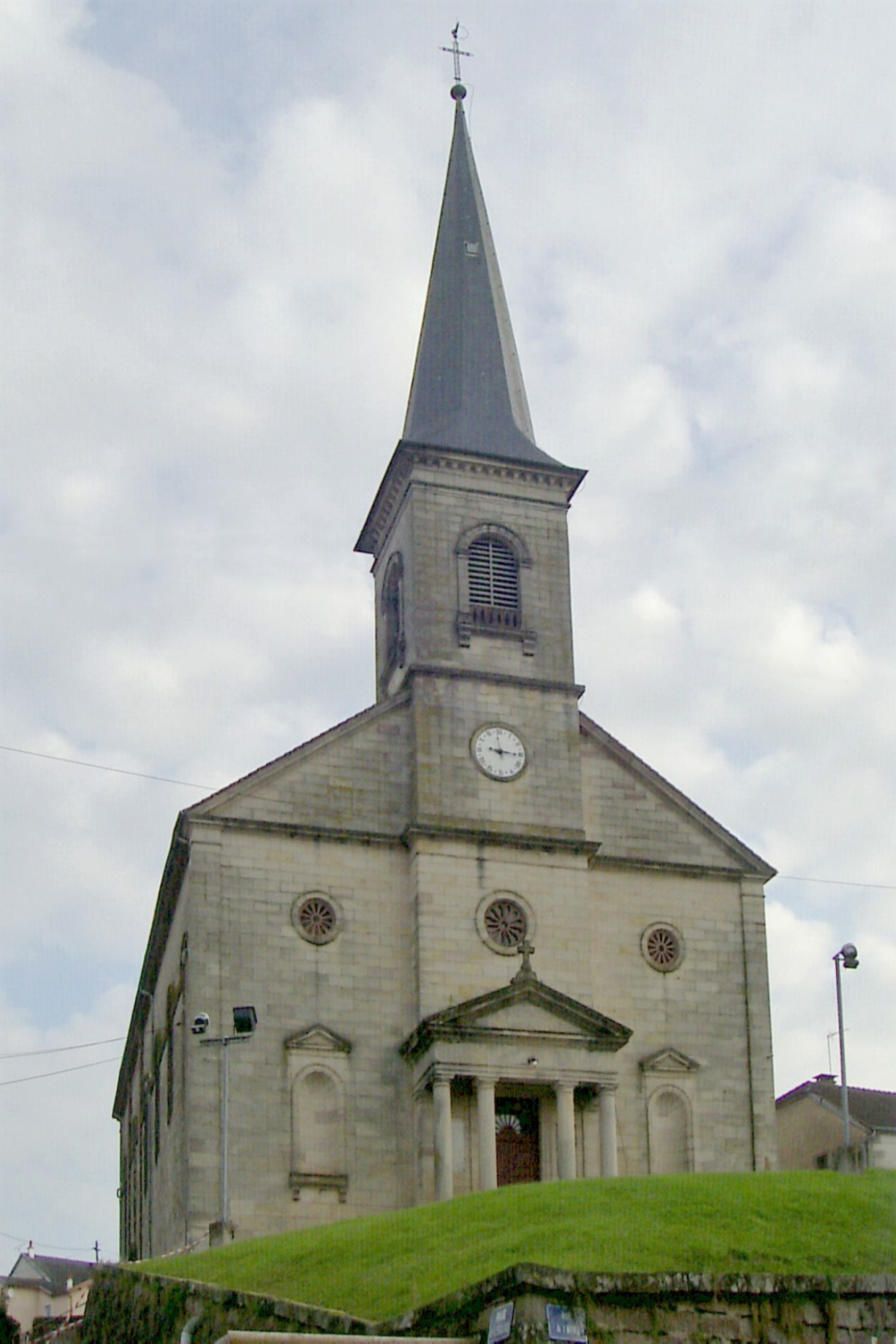
- The church in Aillevillers

- Coat of arms
- Location of Aillevillers-et-Lyaumont
- Location within France Location within Bourgogne-Franche-Comté
- Coordinates: 47°55′16″N 6°20′12″E
- Country: France
- Region: Bourgogne-Franche-Comté
- Department: Haute-Saône
- Arrondissement: Lure
- Canton: Saint-Loup-sur-Semouse
- Intercommunality: Haute Comté

Government
  - Mayor (2020–2026): Jean-Claude Tramesel
- Area^{1}: 36.30 km^{2} (14.02 sq mi)
- Highest elevation: 516 m (1,693 ft)
- Lowest elevation: 260 m (850 ft)
- Population (2023): 1,426
  - Density: 39.28/km^{2} (101.7/sq mi)
- Time zone: UTC+01:00 (CET)
  - Summer (DST): UTC+02:00 (CEST)
- INSEE/Postal code: 70006 /70320
- ^{1} French Land Register data, which excludes lakes, ponds, glaciers > 1 km^{2} (0.386 sq mi or 247 acres) and river estuaries.

Aillevillers-et-Lyaumont is a commune in the Haute-Saône department in the region of Bourgogne-Franche-Comté in eastern France.

The village is included in the land area awarded AOC status in May 2010 in respect of Fougerolles Kirsch, a cherry-based liquor produced nearby.

During the nineteenth century a number of commercial distilleries producing Kirsch were operating at Aillevillers-et-Lyaumont itself, but their number had diminished by the start of the twentieth century and the last survivor closed down in 1976.

== Population ==
Historical population
Year	Pop.	±% p.a.
1968	12,058	—
1975	2,020	−22.53%
1982	1,981	−0.28%
1990	1,883	−0.63%
1999	1,849	−0.20%
2007	1,653	−1.39%
2012	1,645	−0.10%
2017	1,551	−1.17%
2023	1,426	−1.39%
Source: INSEE

== See also ==
- Communes of the Haute-Saône department
