= Pierre Fons =

French poet, novelist and essayist

Autograph

Pierre Fons (16 July 1880 in Toulouse – 23 April 1917 in Cambo-les-Bains) was a French poet, novelist and essayist.

== Biography ==
Born from a family of scholars, he obtained a law degree in Toulouse. He contributed to many magazines in the south of France. At 23, he published a volume of elegies, L'Heure amoureuse et funéraire, foreworded by Émile Pouvillon, a work distinguished by the Académie française. Maître es Jeux at the Académie des Jeux Floraux of Toulouse, he was part of a Toulouse school under the aegis of Marc Lafargue. Author of several collections of poems but also of a series of essays published under the title Le réveil de Pallas, Fons died during the First World War at age 36.

A small part of his library has been kept at the University of Perpignan since 2018.

== Works ==
=== Essays ===
- Le réveil de Pallas (in French). Paris: Bibliothèque internationale d'édition E. Sansot et Cie. 1906. p. 265..
- Le Décor du quattrocento (in French). Paris: Bibliothèque internationale d'édition E. Sansot et Cie. 1907..
- Sully Prud'homme : biographie... suivie d'opinions et d'une bibliographie (in French). Paris: Bibliothèque internationale d'édition E. Sansot et Cie. 1907. p. 48.

=== Poetry ===
- L'Heure amoureuse et funéraire, poème (in French). Paris: Stock. 1904. p. 139.
- La Divinité quotidienne, poèmes (in French). Paris: Bibliothèque internationale d'édition E. Sansot et Cie. 1908. p. 155.

=== Novel ===
- L'Offrande au mystère (in French). Paris: Bibliothèque internationale d'édition E. Sansot et Cie. 1911. p. 146.

=== Bibliography ===
- Robert Sabatier, La poésie du XXe siècle. I, tradition et évolution Paris, Éditions Albin Michel, 1982
- Raoul Davray & Henry Rigal, Anthologie des poètes du Midi : morceaux choisis accompagnés de notices biographiques et d’un essai de bibliographie; Paris, Ollendorff, 1908 Anthologie des poètes du Midi on Gallica
