= Veit (surname) =

Veit is a surname, and may refer to:

- Carola Veit (born 1973), German lawyer and politician
- Conny Veit (born 1949), German musician and painter
- David Veit (1771–1814), Prussian doctor and writer, brother of Simon Veit
- David Veit (field hockey) (born 1938), British field hockey player
- Flora Veit-Wild (born 1947), German literary academic
- Gustav Veit (1824–1903), German gynecologist and obstetrician
- Ivan Veit (1908–2004), American newspaper executive
- Jella Veit (born 2005), German footballer
- Johann Veit (1852–1917), German gynecologist, son of Gustav Veit
- Johannes Veit (1790–1854), German history painter
- Mario Veit (born 1973), German boxer
- Oscar Veit (born 1963), Argentine athlete
- Philipp Veit (1793–1877), German Romantic painter
- Richard Veit (born 1957), American ornithologist and ecologist
- Rüdiger Veit (1949–2020), German lawyer and politician
- Rudy Veit (born 1953), American politician from Missouri
- Sabina Veit (born 1985), Slovenian sprinter
- Simon Veit (1754–1819), German merchant and banker
- Sixten Veit (born 1970), German football player
- Stan Veit (1919–2010), American computer entrepreneur
- Tom Veit, American sports executive
- Václav Jindřich Veit (1806–1864), Czech composer, pianist and lawyer

== See also ==
- Feit
- Sankt Veit (disambiguation), the German name for Saint Vitus and a number of derived names
