= David Veit =

German doctor and writer (1771–1814)

- Born: 8 November 1771; Breslau, Poland
- Died: 15 April 1814 (aged 42)
- Occupations: Doctor; writer

David Veit (8 November 1771, in Breslau – 15 April 1814) was a medical doctor and writer from the Kingdom of Prussia.

== Life ==
His father, Juda Veit (1716–1786), was a banker, and his brother, Simon Veit, was the husband of Moses Mendelssohn's daughter Brendel, making David uncle to the painters Johannes and Philipp Veit. During David Veit's time as a student, he began a correspondence with Rahel Varnhagen von Ense, in which Veit also describes meeting the poet Goethe. Veit and Abraham Mendelssohn travelled to study in Paris before Veit moved to Hamburg in 1799, where he worked as a doctor and writer and became associated with figures including Johann Albert Heinrich Reimarus, Friedrich Christoph Perthes, Friedrich Heinrich Jacobi and Johann Gottlieb Fichte.

== Works ==
- De organorum corporis humani tam energia seu activitate interna quam cum organis sociis connexione sen sympathia, Halle 1797
- Allgemeine theoretische und praktische Grundsätze der chemischen Affinität oder Wahlanziehung zum gemeinnützigen Gebrauch für Naturforscher, Chemisten, Aerzte und Apotheker, Berlin 1794
- J. A. H. Reimarus nach zurückgelegten Fünfzig Jahren seiner medizinischen Laufbahn. Ein biographischer Beytrag zur Feyer des 29. Aprils, Hamburg 1807

== Bibliography ==
- (in German) Ludmilla Assing: Briefwechsel zwischen Rahel und David Veit, 2 volumes, Leipzig 1861
- (in German) L. Geiger: Briefe von und an David Veit, Festschrift zum 70. Geburtstag Martin Philippsons, Berlin 1916
- (in German) T. Zondek: Dr. med. David Veit (1771-1814), in: Hamburgische Geschichts- und Heimatblätter 8, 1970, S. 120–128
- (in German) T. Zondek: Dr. med. David Veit (1771-1814). Eine Gestalt aus der Emanzipationszeit, in: Bulletin des Leo Baeck Institutes, 15. Jg., Neue Folge, Nr. 52, S.49-77
