= Die Einführung der Künste in Deutschland durch das Christentum =

Triptych by Philipp Veit

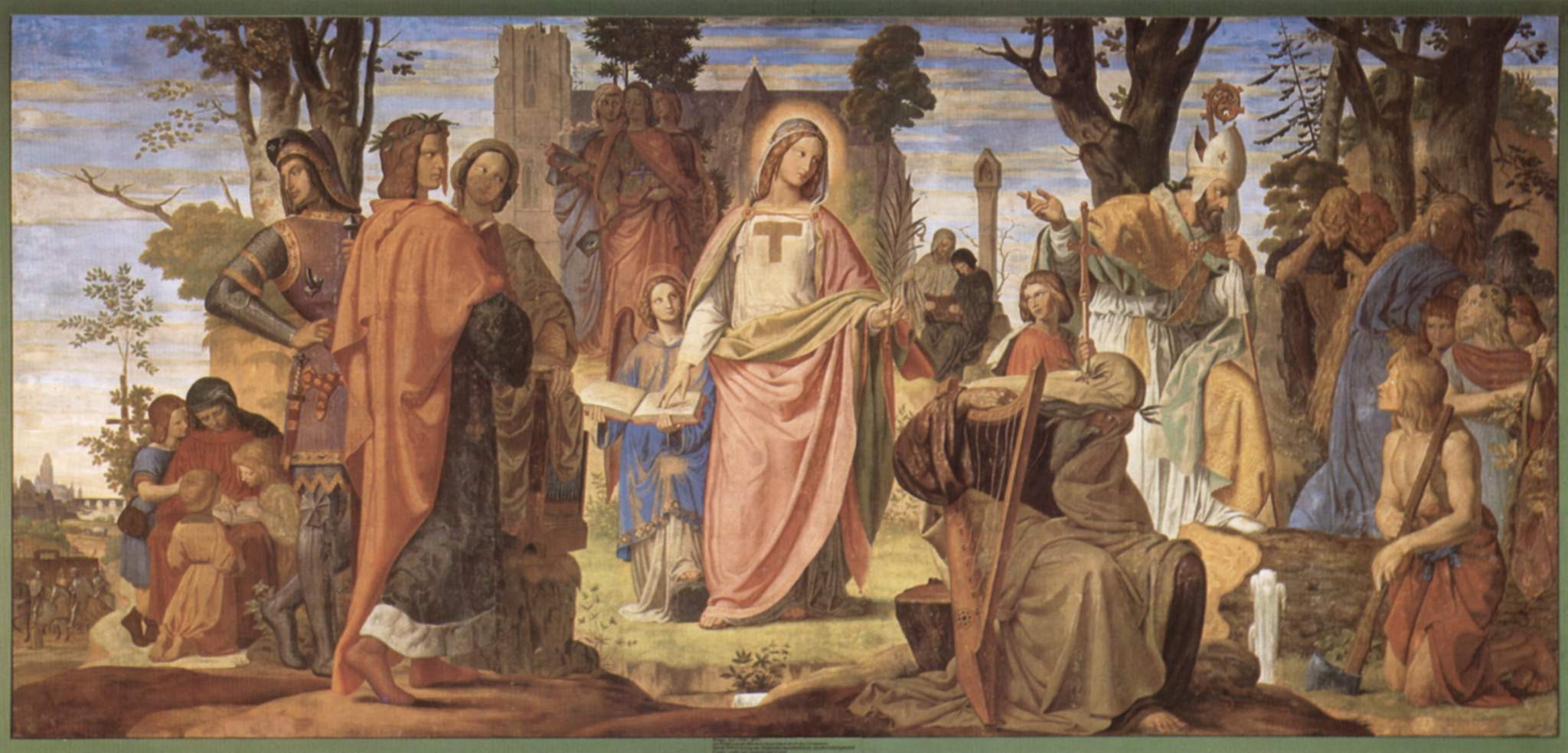

Die Einführung der Künste in Deutschland durch das Christentum (1834–1836) is a triptych by German artist Philipp Veit (1793–1877), which allegorically represents the introduction of the arts into Germany through Christianity. The central panel has a woman representing Christianity, surrounded by personifications of the arts (painting, sculpture, and architecture in the background, and poetry, music, and chivalry on the foreground, on the left). A group of people on the right are listening to a sermon by Saint Boniface, portrayed as the missionizer of Germany. A sad and dark figure on the front, holding a small harp, stands for paganism: his era has come to an end. The work is a fresco, transferred onto fabric.
