= Henriette Herz =

German writer (1764–1847)

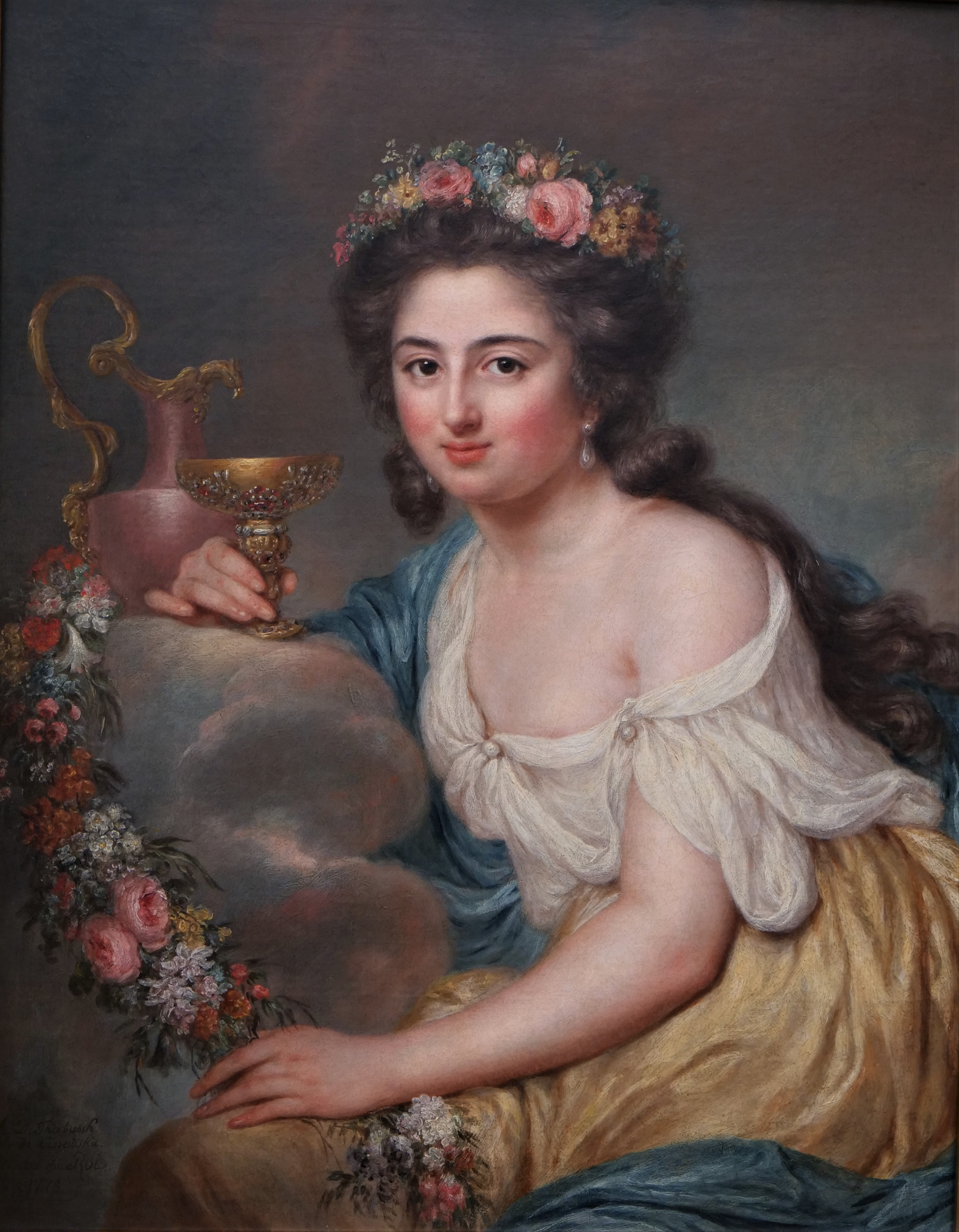
Henriette Herz, née Henriette de Lemos, by Anna Dorothea Therbusch, 1778

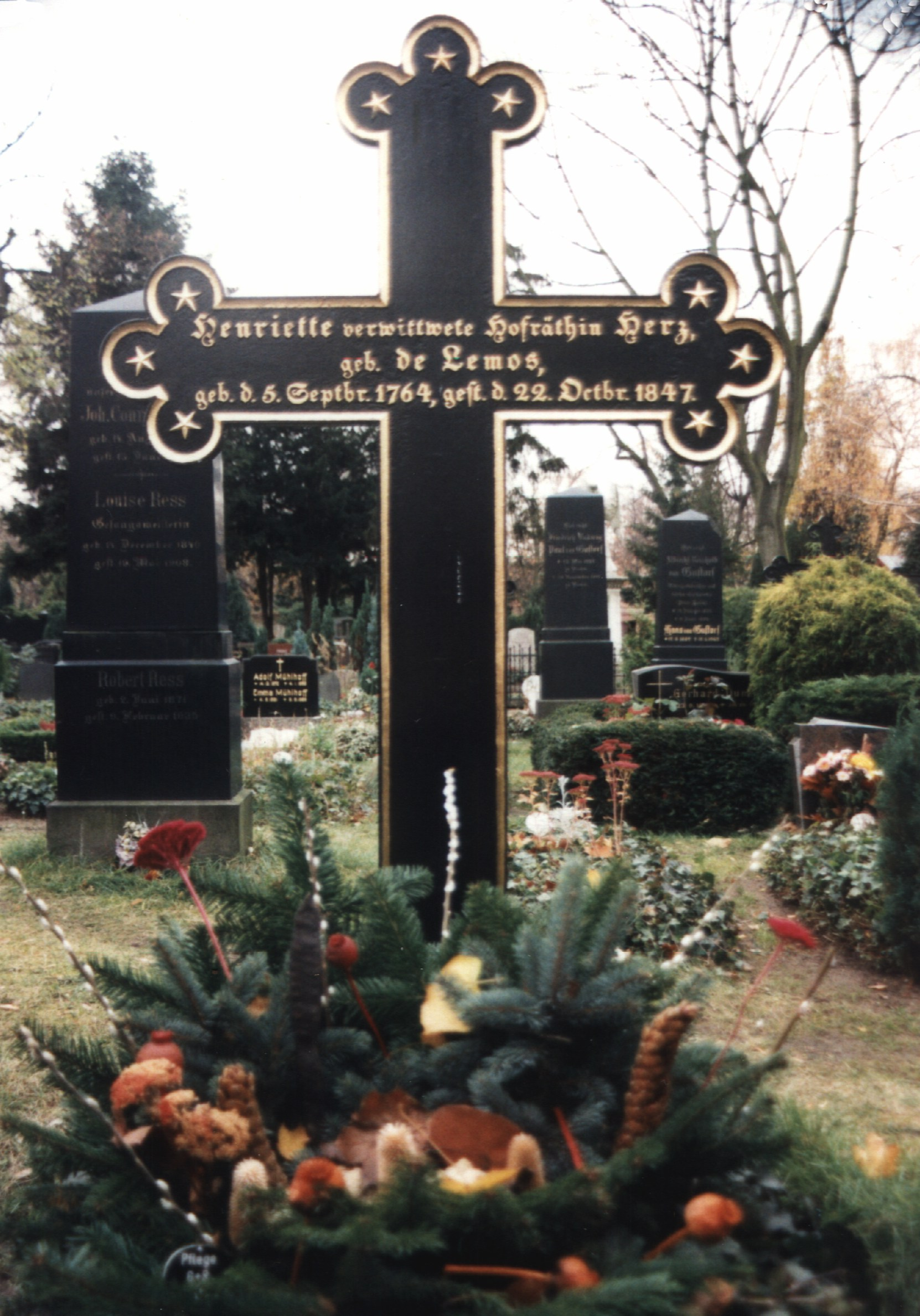
Grave of Henriette Herz

Henriette Julie Herz (née de Lemos; September 5, 1764 – October 22, 1847) was a German writer, best known for the "salonnieres" or literary salons that she started with a group of Jewish converts to Christianity in Prussia.

== Biography ==
She was the daughter of a physician, Benjamin de Lemos (1711–1789), descended from a Portuguese Jewish family of Hamburg, and his second wife Esther de Lemos (née Charleville) (1742–1817). The first wife of her father was Chana Charleville (1707–1762).

Henriette Herz was born and grew up in the Berlin of the Jewish emancipation and shared tutors apparently with Moses Mendelssohn's daughters. At age fifteen, she married a physician Markus Herz (1747–1803), seventeen years her senior. The marriage remained childless. Markus Herz had studied medicine at the University of Königsberg, one of only three universities that accepted Jews—but only in its medical faculty. She was said to be an extremely beautiful woman.

After a few years the salon split in two, a science-seminar led by her husband and a literary salon by Henriette herself. Most notable men and women in Berlin were said to have attended her salon. Among her friends and acquaintances were Dorothea von Schlegel, Wilhelm von Humboldt and his brother Alexander von Humboldt, Jean Paul, Friedrich Schiller, Mirabeau, Friedrich Rückert, Karl Wilhelm Ramler, Johann Jakob Engel, Georg Ludwig Spalding, the Danish Barthold Georg Niebuhr, Johannes von Müller, the sculptor Schadow, Salomon Maimon, Friedrich von Gentz, Fanny von Arnstein, Madame de Genlis, Alexander zu Dohna-Schlobitten, Gustav von Brinkmann, and Friedrich Schlegel.

Alexander von Humboldt often visited and even received Hebrew lessons from Henriette. The theologian Friedrich Schleiermacher was another frequent visitor. After the death of her husband she came under the powerful influence of Schleiermacher and converted to Protestantism.

She died in Berlin. Her grave is preserved in the Protestant Friedhof II der Jerusalems- und Neuen Kirchengemeinde (Cemetery No. II of the congregations of Jerusalem's Church and New Church) in Berlin-Kreuzberg, south of Hallesches Tor.
