= Dorothea von Schlegel =

German novelist and translator (1764–1839)

Dorothea Friederike von Schlegel
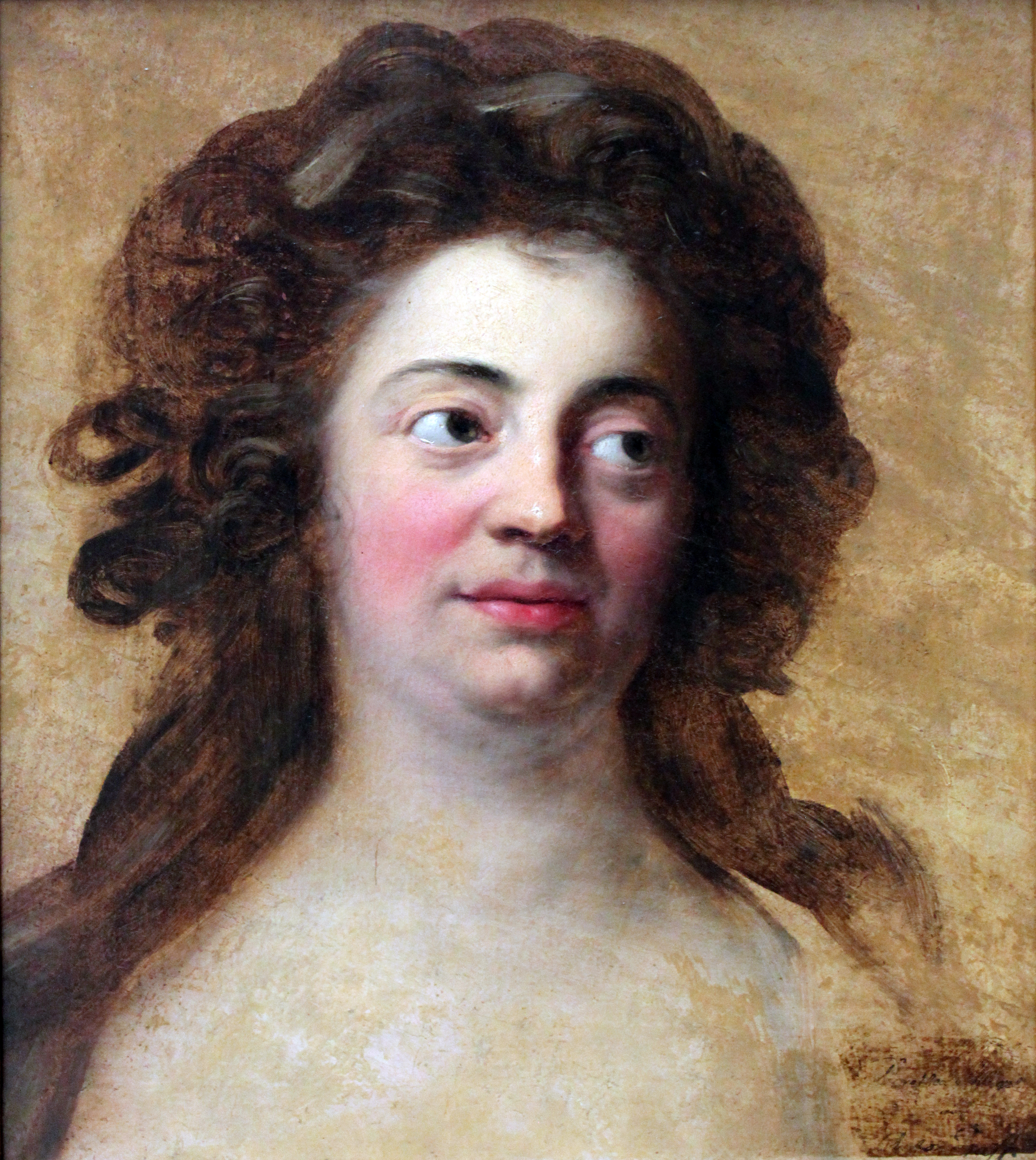
- Portrait by Anton Graff (c.1790)
- Born: Brendel Mendelssohn; 24 October 1764; Berlin, Germany
- Died: 3 August 1839 (aged 74); Frankfurt am Main, Germany
- Occupations: Novelist, translator
- Era: German Enlightenment
- Notable work: Florentin (1801)
- Spouses: Simon Veit (m. 1783; div. 1799); * Friedrich von Schlegel (m. 1804)
- Children: Philipp Veit
- Parent: Moses Mendelssohn (father)
- Family: Mendelssohn family

Dorothea Friederike von Schlegel (née Brendel Mendelssohn; 24 October 1764 – 3 August 1839) was a German novelist and translator.

== Life ==
She was born as Brendel Mendelssohn in 1764 in Berlin, oldest daughter of the philosopher Moses Mendelssohn, a leading figure in the German Enlightenment (die deutsche Aufklärung). In 1783, she married the merchant and banker Simon Veit (1754–1819), brother of the physician David Veit (1771–1814). Their son, Philipp Veit, would later become part of a circle of German Christian painters called "the Nazarenes", who influenced the English painters in the Pre-Raphaelite Brotherhood. She met the poet and critic Friedrich von Schlegel in the salon of her friend Henriette Herz in July 1797, after which Dorothea divorced Simon on 11 January 1799.

She obtained custody of her younger son, Philipp, and lived with him in an apartment on Ziegelstraße in Jena. This apartment became a salon frequented by Tieck, Schelling, the Schlegel brothers, and Novalis.

In 1801, Schlegel anonymously published Dorothea's novel Florentin. Dorothea and Friedrich lived in Paris from 1802 until 1804, and after her divorce, they married as Protestants. In 1807, she translated "Corinne" by Madame de Staël from French.

In 1808, Friedrich and Dorothea converted to Catholicism. (She may have adopted the name "Dorothea" from a 17th-century Dorothea von Schlegel who composed Catholic hymns). They continued to visit the salons of Rahel Levin and Henriette Herz, as well as the constellation which surrounded Madame de Staël. Friedrich died in 1829, after which Dorothea moved to Frankfurt am Main. There, she lived with her son Philipp (also a convert to a medieval style of Catholicism) until she died in 1839.

== Importance in cultural history ==
As the daughter of a member of the German literary establishment, Moses Mendelssohn, Dorothea was surrounded throughout her life by poets, critics, musicians, novelists, and philosophers of Europe. Gotthold Ephraim Lessing was her father's closest friend and colleague, and the Emancipation and secularization of the Jews and Jewish culture was a direct outcome of their work. (Mendelssohn was the model for Nathan der Weise in Lessing's play of the same name.) Dorothea's brother, Joseph, was a friend and sponsor of Alexander von Humboldt, the naturalist and ethnologist. Felix Mendelssohn, the composer, and his sister Fanny Mendelssohn, also a gifted musician, were her nephew and niece.

Her association with Germaine de Staël was obviously of the greatest importance since Mme de Staël was also the patron and literary companion of Dorothea's second husband, Friedrich Schlegel. The daughter of Jacques Necker, Louis XVI's finance minister, de Staël witnessed the collapse of the Bourbons and the French Revolution. (See Christopher Herrold's "Mistress to an Age.") It was probably through de Staël's husband, a Swedish Count, that the Schlegels were granted a title of nobility in the Swedish court.

== Works ==
- Florentin. Lübeck and Leipzig, 1801.
- "Gespräch über die neueren Romane der Französinnen" [Conversation about recent novels of French women writers] in: Europa: Eine Zeitschrift (journal edited by Friedrich Schlegel), 1803, vol. 1, part 2, pp. 88–106
- Geschichte des Zauberers Merlin [Story of the Magician Merlin]. Leipzig, 1804. Translated and adapted from French sources
