= Friedrich Schlegel =

German poet, critic, philosopher, and Indologist (1772–1829)

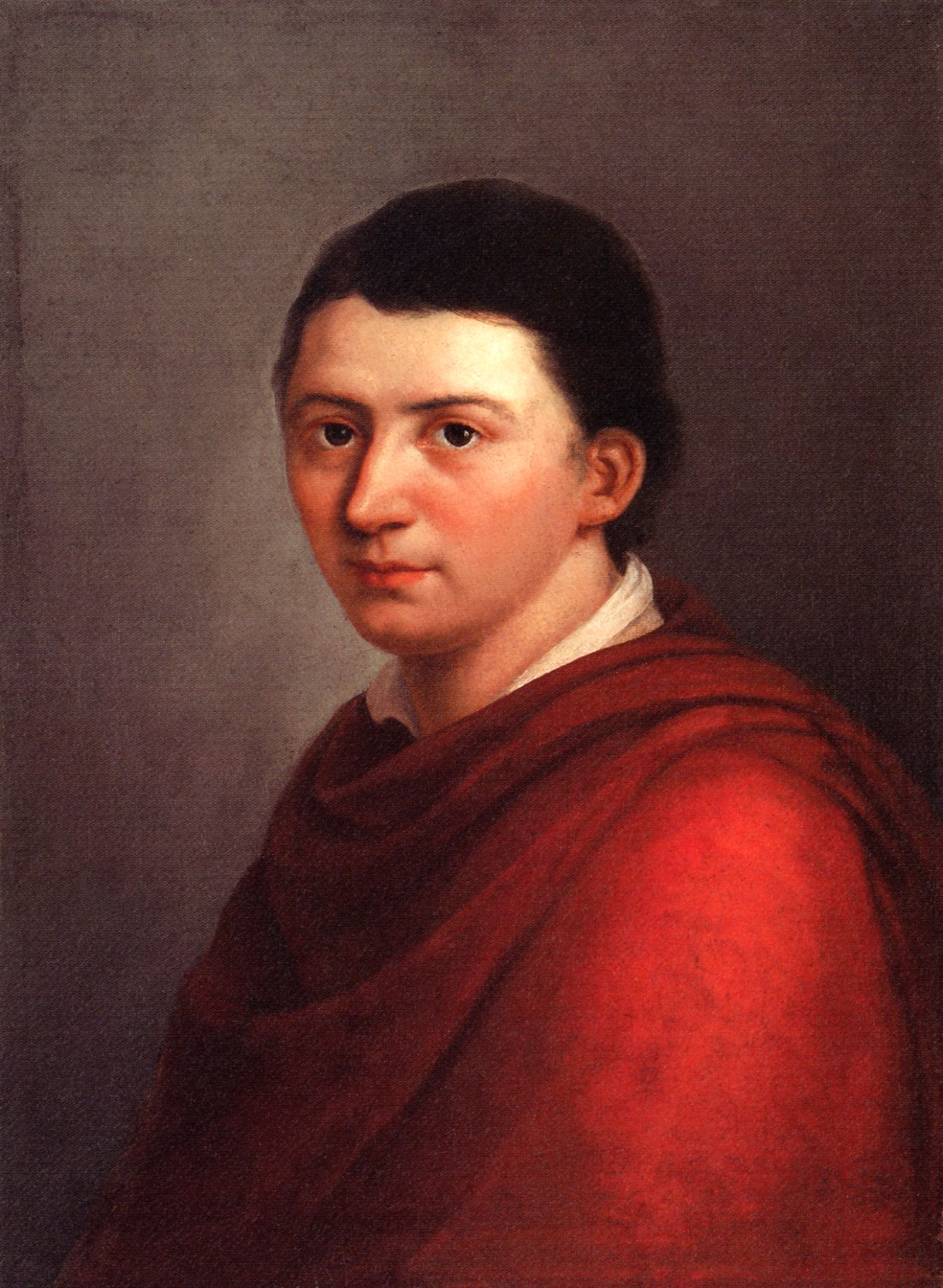
- Portrait by Franz Gareis, 1801
- Born: Karl Wilhelm Friedrich Schlegel; 10 March 1772; Hanover, Electorate of Hanover
- Died: 12 January 1829 (aged 56); Dresden, Kingdom of Saxony
- Father: Johann Adolf Schlegel
- Relatives: Johann Elias Schlegel (uncle); August Wilhelm Schlegel (brother)

Education
- Education: University of Göttingen; University of Leipzig
- Academic advisor: C. G. Heyne

Philosophical work
- Era: 19th-century philosophy
- Region: Western philosophy
- School: Jena Romanticism
- Institutions: University of Jena
- Notable students: G. W. F. Hegel
- Main interests: Epistemology, philology, philosophy of history
- Notable ideas: Grounding epistemology on reciprocal proof (Wechselerweis), not original principle (Grundsatz); Grimm's law; Out of India theory; Coining the term "Romantic"

Karl Wilhelm Friedrich von Schlegel (/ˈʃleɪɡəl/ SHLAY-gəl; German: [ˈfʁiːdʁɪç ˈʃleːɡl̩]; 10 March 1772 – 12 January 1829) was a German literary critic, philosopher, and Indologist. With his older brother, August Wilhelm Schlegel, he was one of the main figures of Jena Romanticism.

Born into a fervently Protestant family, Schlegel rejected religion as a young man in favor of atheism and individualism. He entered university to study law but instead focused on classical literature. He began a career as a writer and lecturer, and founded journals such as Athenaeum. In 1808, Schlegel returned to Christianity as a married man, with both him and his wife being baptized into the Catholic Church. This conversion ultimately led to his estrangement from family and old friends. He moved to the Austrian Empire in 1809, where he became a diplomat and journalist in service of Klemens von Metternich, the Foreign Minister of the Austrian Empire. Schlegel died in 1829, at the age of 56.

Schlegel was a promoter of the Romantic movement and inspired Samuel Taylor Coleridge, Adam Mickiewicz and Kazimierz Brodziński. The first to notice what became known as Grimm's law, Schlegel was a pioneer in Indo-European studies, comparative linguistics, and morphological typology, publishing in 1819 the first theory linking the Indo-Iranian and German languages under the Aryan group. Some of his works were set to music by Schubert, Mendelssohn and Schumann.

== Life and work ==
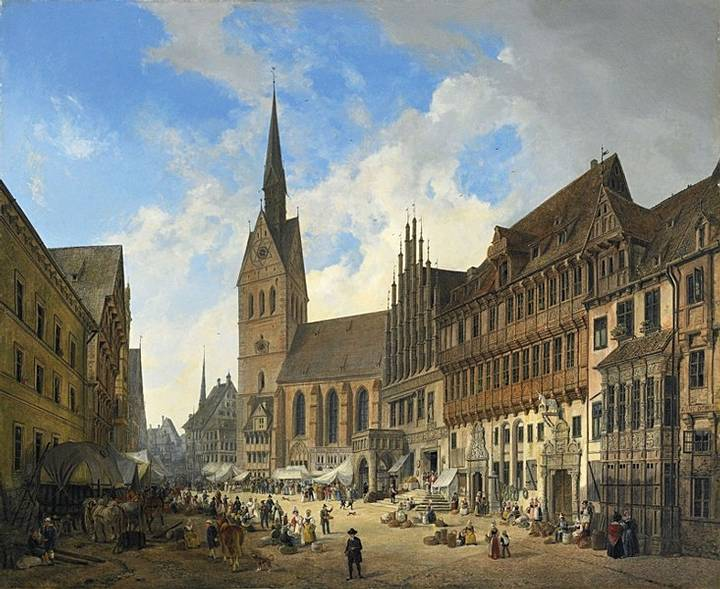
Hanover's Market Church Oil painting after Domenico Quaglio (1832)

Karl Friedrich von Schlegel was born on 10 March 1772 at Hanover, where his father, Johann Adolf Schlegel, was a Lutheran pastor at the Market Church. For two years, he studied law at Göttingen and Leipzig, and he met with Friedrich Schiller. In 1793, he devoted himself entirely to literary work. In 1796, he moved to Jena, where his brother August Wilhelm lived, and here he collaborated with Novalis, Ludwig Tieck, Fichte, and Caroline Schelling, who married August Wilhelm. In 1797, he quarreled with Schiller, who did not like his polemic work.

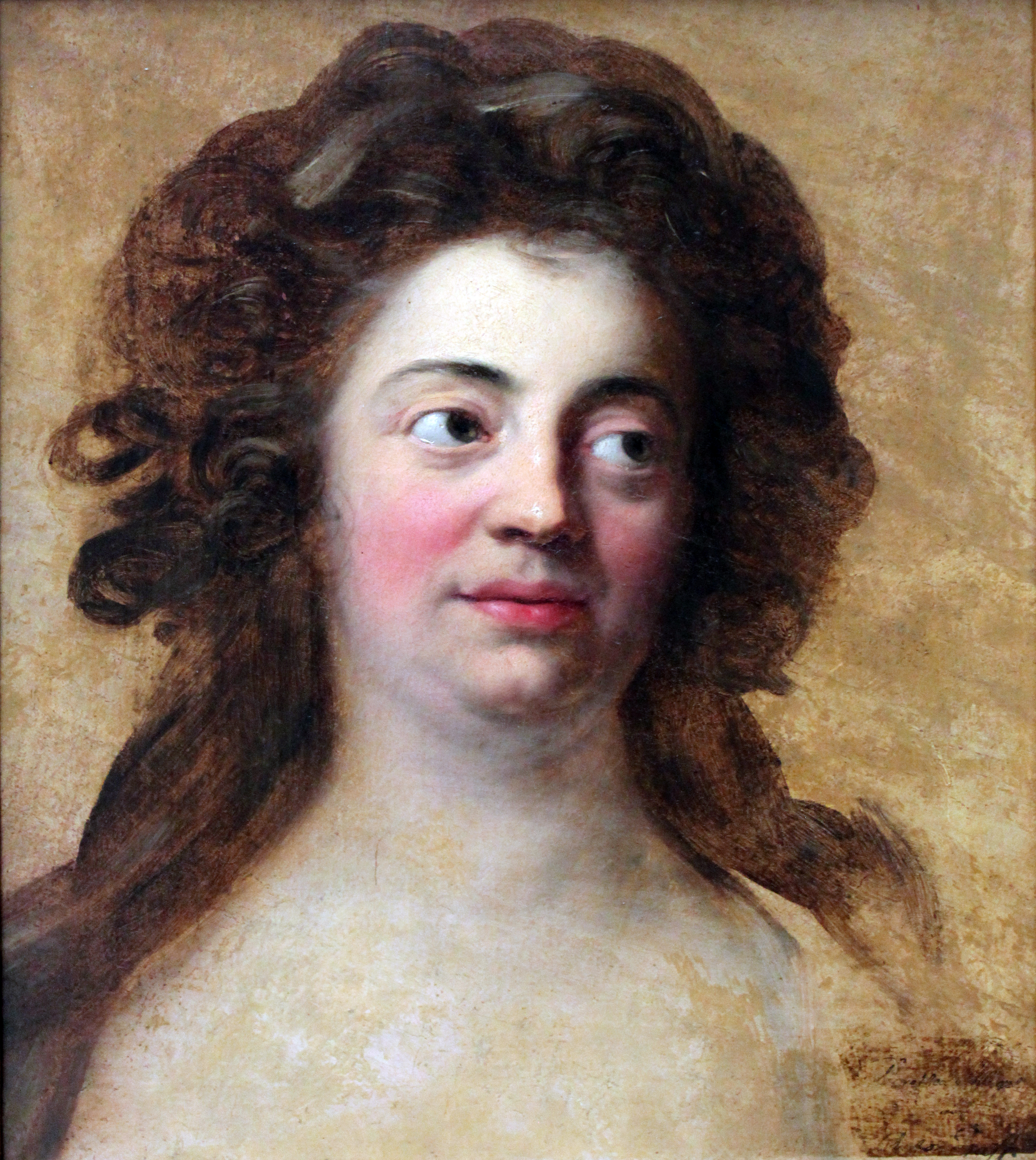
Dorothea von Schlegel (1790) by Anton Graff

Schlegel published Die Griechen und Römer (The Greeks and Romans) (1797), which was followed by Geschichte der Poesie der Griechen und Römer (History of the Poetry of the Greeks and Romans) (1798). Then he turned to Dante, Goethe, and Shakespeare. In Jena, he and his brother founded the journal Athenaeum, contributing fragments, aphorisms, and essays in which the principles of the Romantic school are most definitely stated. They are now generally recognized as the deepest and most significant expressions of the subjective idealism of the early Romanticists.

After a controversy, Friedrich decided to move to Berlin. There he lived with Friedrich Schleiermacher and met Henriette Herz, Rahel Varnhagen, and his future wife, Dorothea Veit, a daughter of Moses Mendelssohn. In 1799, he published Part I of Lucinde, A Novel, which was seen as an account of his affair with Dorothea, causing a scandal in German literary circles. The novel, to which no further parts were ever added, attempted to apply the Romantic demand for complete individual freedom to practical ethics. Lucinde, which extolled the union of sensual and spiritual love as an allegory of the divine cosmic Eros, contributed to the failure of his academic career in Jena where he completed his studies in 1801 and lectured as a Privatdozent on transcendental philosophy. In September 1800, he met four times with Goethe, who would later stage his tragedy Alarcos (1802) in Weimar, albeit with a notable lack of success.

In June 1802, he arrived in Paris, where he lived in the house formerly owned by Baron d'Holbach and joined a circle including Heinrich Christoph Kolbe. He lectured on philosophy in private courses for Sulpiz Boisserée, and under the tutelage of Antoine-Léonard de Chézy and linguist Alexander Hamilton, he continued to study Sanskrit and the Persian language. He edited the journal Europa (1803), where he published essays about Gothic architecture and the Old Masters. In April 1804, he married Dorothea Veit in the Swedish embassy in Paris, after she had undergone the requisite conversion from Judaism to Protestantism. In 1806, he and his wife went to visit Aubergenville, where his brother lived with Madame de Staël.

In 1808, he published Über die Sprache und Weisheit der Indier (On the Language and Wisdom of India). Here he advanced his ideas about religion and argued that a people originating from India were the founders of the first European civilizations. Schlegel compared Sanskrit with Latin, Greek, Persian, and German, noting many similarities in vocabulary and grammar. The assertion of the common features of these languages is now generally accepted, albeit with significant revisions. There is less agreement about the geographic region where these precursors settled, although the Out of India model has generally become discredited.

In 1808, he and his wife joined the Catholic Church in the Cologne Cathedral. From this time on, he became more and more opposed to the principles of political and religious liberalism. He went to Vienna and in 1809 was appointed imperial court secretary at the military headquarters, editing the army newspaper and issuing fiery proclamations against Napoleon. He accompanied archduke Charles, Duke of Teschen to war and was stationed in Pest during the War of the Fifth Coalition. Here he studied the Hungarian language. Meanwhile, he had published his collected Geschichte (Histories) (1809) and two series of lectures, Über die neuere Geschichte (On Recent History) (1811) and Geschichte der alten und neuen Literatur (On Old and New Literature) (1815). In 1815, he was knighted in the Supreme Order of Christ.

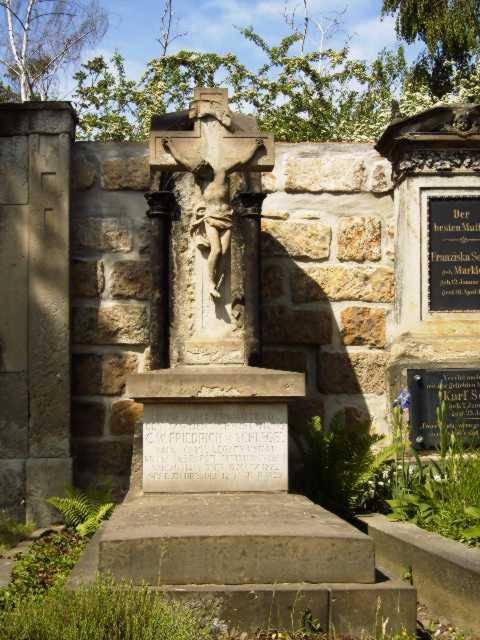
Schlegel's grave at the Old Catholic Cemetery, Dresden

In collaboration with Josef von Pilat, editor of the Österreichischer Beobachter, and with the help of Adam Müller and Friedrich Schlegel, Metternich and Gentz projected a vision of Austria as the spiritual leader of a new Germany, drawing her strength and inspiration from a romanticised view of a medieval Catholic past.

Following the Congress of Vienna (1815), he was councilor of legation in the Austrian embassy at the Frankfurt Diet, but in 1818 he returned to Vienna. In 1819 he and Clemens Brentano made a trip to Rome, in the company of Metternich and Gentz. There he met with his wife and her sons. In 1820 he started a conservative Catholic magazine, Concordia (1820–1823), but was criticized by Metternich and by his brother August Wilhelm, then professor of Indology in Bonn and busy publishing the Bhagavad Gita. Schlegel began the issue of his Sämtliche Werke (Collected Works). He also delivered lectures, which were republished in his Philosophie des Lebens (Philosophy of Life) (1828) and in his Philosophie der Geschichte (Philosophy of History) (1829). He died on 12 January 1829 at Dresden, while preparing a series of lectures.

== Dorothea Schlegel ==
Friedrich Schlegel's wife, Dorothea von Schlegel, authored an unfinished romance, Florentin (1802), a Sammlung romantischer Dichtungen des Mittelalters (Collection of Romantic Poems of the Middle Ages) (2 volumes, 1804), a version of Lother und Maller (1805), and a translation of Madame de Staël's Corinne (1807–1808) — all of which were issued under her husband's name. By her first marriage she had two sons, Johannes and Philipp Veit, who became eminent Catholic painters. She was the eldest daughter of Moses Mendelssohn, which made the prodigious composers Felix and Fanny her niece and nephew.

== Selected works ==
- Vom ästhetischen Werte der griechischen Komödie (1794)
- Über die Diotima (1795)
- Versuch über den Begriff des Republikanismus (1796)
- Georg Forster (1797)
- Über das Studium der griechischen Poesie (1797)
- Über Lessing (1797)
- Kritische Fragmente („Lyceums"-Fragmente) (1797)
- Fragmente („Athenaeums"-Fragmente) (1797–1798)
- Lucinde (1799)
- Über die Philosophie. An Dorothea (1799)
- Gespräch über die Poesie (1800)
- Über die Unverständlichkeit (1800)
- Ideen (1800)
- Charakteristiken und Kritiken (1801)
- Transcendentalphilosophie (1801)
- Alarkos (1802)
- Reise nach Frankreich (1803)
- Geschichte der europäischen Literatur (1803/1804)
- Grundzüge der gotischen Baukunst (1804/1805)
- Über die Sprache und Weisheit der Indier (1808)
- Deutsches Museum (as ed.), 4 Volumes Vienna (1812–1813)
- Geschichte der alten und neueren Literatur (lectures) (1815)

=== Letters ===
- Ludwig Tieck und die Brüder Schlegel. Briefe ed. by Edgar Lohner (München 1972)

Friedrich Schlegel's Sämtliche Werke appeared in 10 volumes (1822–1825); a second edition (1846) in 55 volumes His Prosaische Jugendschriften (1794–1802) have been edited by J. Minor (1882, 2nd edition 1906); there are also reprints of Lucinde, and F. Schleiermacher's Vertraute Briefe über Lucinde, 1800 (1907). See R. Haym, Die romantische Schule (1870); I. Rouge, F. Schlegel et la génie du romantisme allemand (1904); by the same, Erläuterungen zu F. Schlegels „Lucinde" (1905); M. Joachimi, Die Weltanschauung der Romantik (1905); W. Glawe, Die Religion F. Schlegels (1906); E. Kircher, Philosophie der Deutschen Romantik (1906); M. Frank "Unendliche Annäherung". Die Anfänge der philosophischen Frühromantik (1997); Andrew Bowie, From Romanticism to Critical Theory: The Philosophy of German Literary Theory (1997).
