= Johannes Veit =

German painter

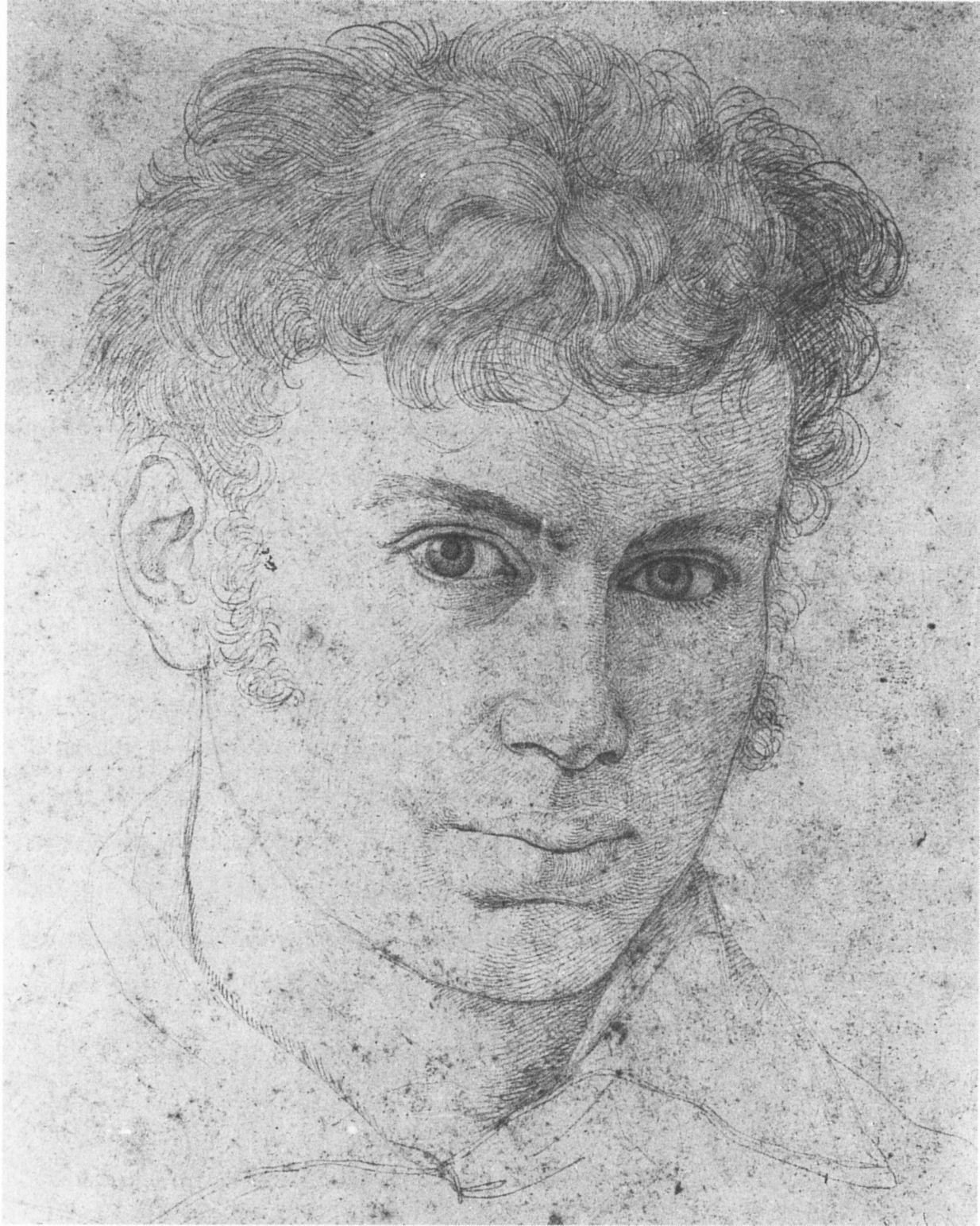
Johannes Veit; by Philipp Veit (1820)

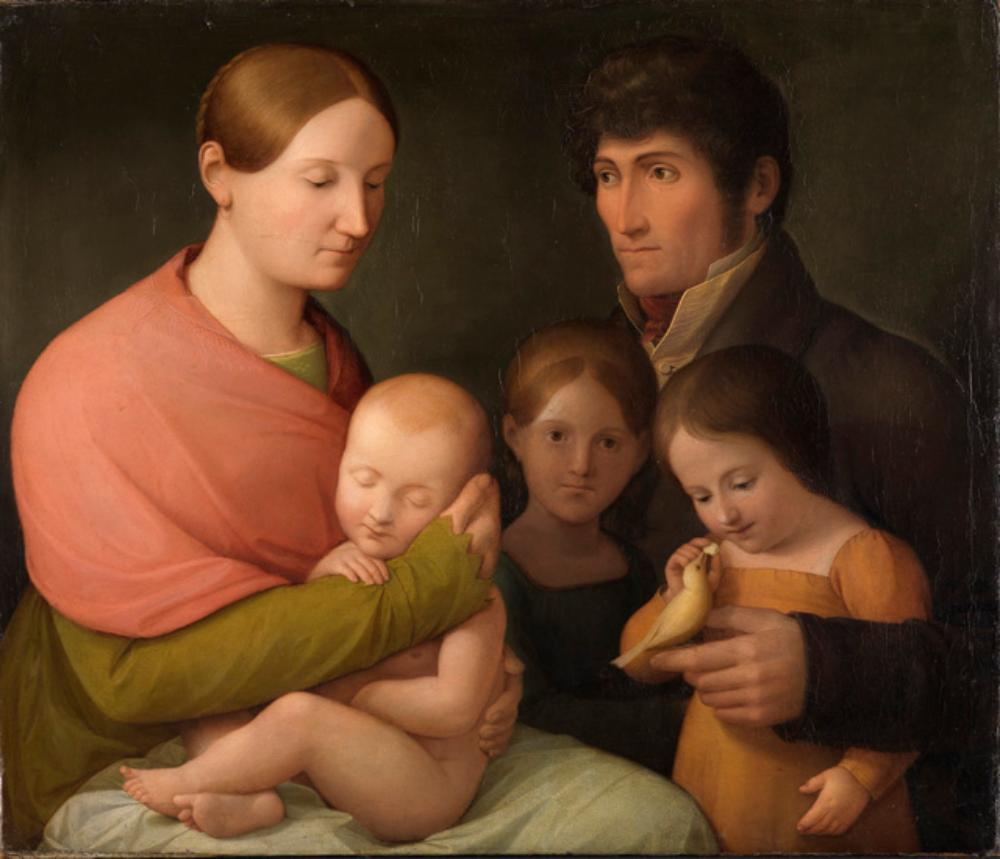
Portrait of the Pulini Family

Johannes Veit, originally Jonas Veit (2 March 1790, Berlin – 18 January 1854, Rome) was a German history painter. After 1811, he lived and worked in Rome, where he was a member of the Nazarene movement.

== Life and work ==
He was born to the banker, Simon Veit, and his wife Brendel; daughter of the philosopher, Moses Mendelssohn. After his parents divorced, in 1799, he stayed in Berlin with his father. In 1805, he went to Hamburg and began an apprenticeship at Mendelssohn & Co., a private banking firm owned by his uncles, Joseph and Abraham Mendelssohn. Three years later, inspired by his brother Philipp, he decided to take up art instead, and enrolled at the Dresden Academy of Fine Arts, where he studied with Friedrich Matthäi.

In 1810, he and Philipp converted to Catholicism, as their mother had, two years before. It was then, at his baptism, that he took the name "Johannes". The following year, after a brief period working in Vienna, he moved to Rome, although he had originally planned to go to Paris. The occasion for his change of mind was his interest in the works of Gottlieb Schick, who was then living in Rome, and in poor health. Following Schick's return to Stuttgart, he befriended Friedrich Overbeck, and became involved in the Nazarene movement.

He was a slow, painstaking worker, who made very heavy demands on himself. As a result, his output was rather small. One of his most familiar works is an early "Adoration of the Shepherds", at St. Hedwig's Cathedral in Berlin.
