= Simon Veit =

German merchant and banker (1754–1819)

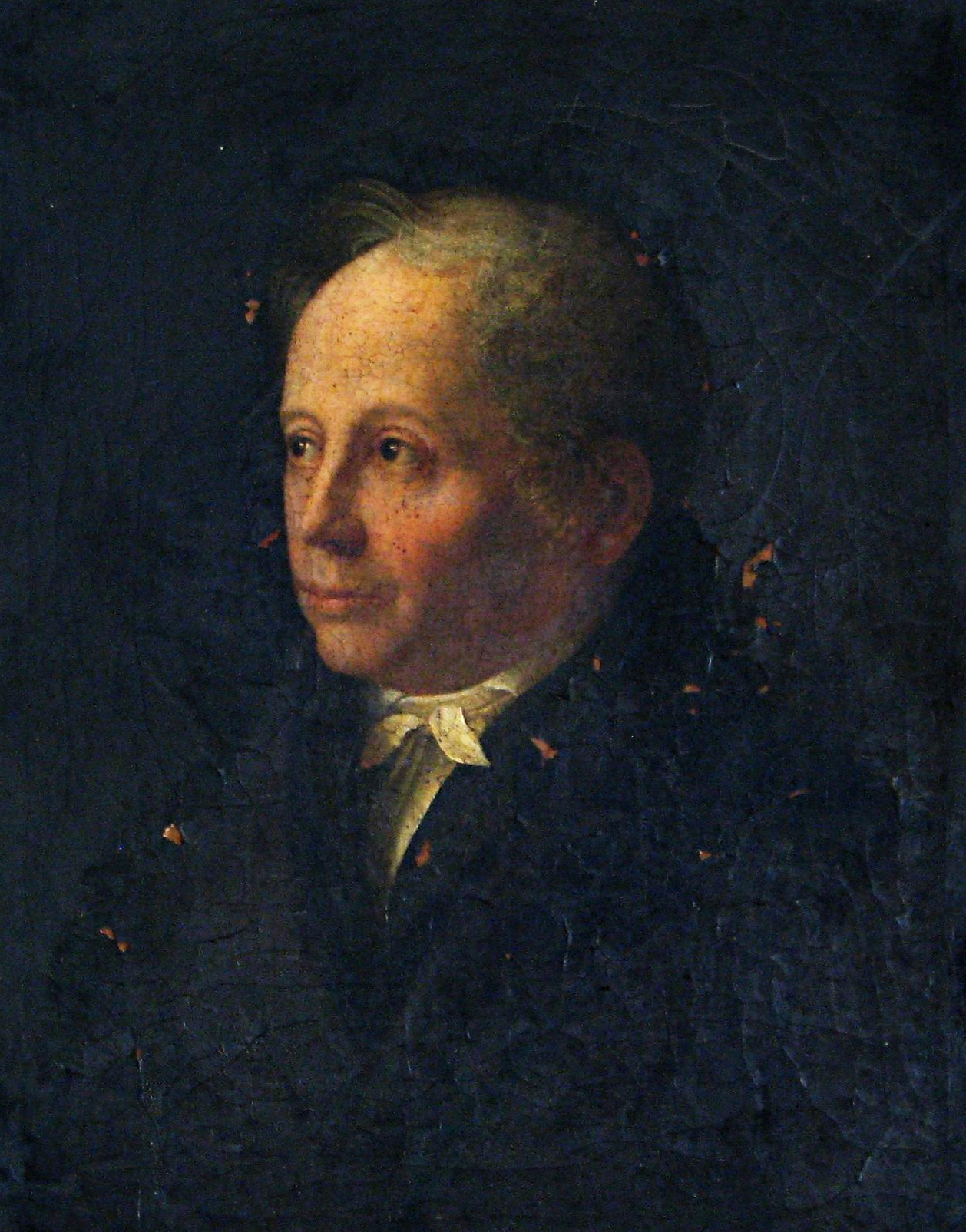
Simon Veit, portrait by Johannes Veit (1809–1810)

Simon Veit (25 May 1754, Brandenburg? - 1 October 1819, Berlin?) was a German merchant and banker of Jewish ancestry.

== Life and work ==
His father, Juda Veit (1710–1786), was a wool merchant and founder of a bank. Simon had several brothers and sisters, including Esther Veit (1743–1795), who married Feibel Philipp Hirsch Praeger (1733–1817), Cheile Veit (b. 1743), who married Ruben Meyer (1737–1819), Joseph Veit (1745–1831), Salomon Veit (1751–1827), David Veit (1753–1835), Philipp Veit (1758–1838) and Adele Veit (b. 1759), who married Moses Mertens (1757–1839). He was descended from one of the fifty Jewish families that had been expelled from Vienna and settled in Brandenburg, at the invitation of Elector Friedrich Wilhelm. They were from the upper classes and possessed a "letter of protection" (Revidiertes General-Privileg), allowing them and their descendants the right of residence.

He is best known as the first husband of Brendel Mendelssohn, who is better known as Dorothea von Schlegel, and as father of the artists, Jonas and Philipp Veit. Moses Mendelssohn had chosen Veit from among his acquaintances to be his daughter's husband, because Veit's letter of protection offered her a degree of security that could not otherwise be obtained.

They were betrothed in 1778, married in 1783, and had four children, but only Jonas and Philipp survived infancy. Both converted to Catholicism, as did their mother, and later became members of the art movement known as the Nazarenes. After sixteen unhappy years, they were divorced, in 1799. Jonas remained at home, while Philipp left with his mother. She later married the philosopher, Friedrich Schlegel.

He never converted; providing financial support for his ex-wife and sons for as long as it was needed. He was a member of the Stock Exchange Corporation, favored the reorganization of Jewish worship, according to plans proposed by David Friedländer, and contributed to charitable societies for both the Jewish and gentile poor. After Moses Mendelssohn's death, he served as an advisor to his widow, Fromet.

== Sources ==
- Sebastian Hensel (Ed.): Die Familie Mendelssohn 1729–1847. Adamant 1995, ISBN 978-0-543-92228-1
- Carola Stern: "Ich möchte mir Flügel wünschen". Das Leben der Dorothea Schlegel. Reinbek 1993, ISBN 978-3-499-13836-2
- Thomas Lackmann: Das Glück der Mendelssohns, Geschichte einer deutschen Familie. Nicolai 2007, ISBN 978-3-89479-904-5
- Hazel Rosenstrauch: Simon Veit. Der missachtete Mann einer berühmten Frau. Persona 2019, ISBN 978-3-924652-44-9
