= Aaron Solomon Gumperz =

German Jewish scholar and physician (1723-1769)

- Born: December 10, 1723; Berlin, Kingdom of Prussia
- Died: April 10, 1769; Hamburg, Kingdom of Prussia
- Education: University of Frankfurt (Oder)
- Occupations: Scholar, physician
- Known for: Teacher of Moses Mendelssohn; early Jewish academic physician in Prussia

Aaron Solomon Gumperz (December 10, 1723 – April 10, 1769) was a Jewish German scholar and physician.

In March, 1751, Gumperz graduated with a degree in medicine from the University of Frankfurt (Oder), his dissertation being "Ueber die Temperamente" (tr. About the temperaments). He was the first Prussian Jew who obtained a doctor's degree.

Gumperz was especially known for having been Moses Mendelssohn's teacher of philosophy and for having inspired him with a love for literature. He is noted for introducing Mendelssohn to Gotthold Ephraim Lessing (author of Nathan the Wise) for his skilled chess playing and teaching not only philosophy, but Western languages and science as well.

He wrote a Hebrew calendar for the year 5509 (1748-1749), and "Megalleh Sod", a supercommentary on Ibn Ezra to the Five Scrolls. Of the latter work that part dealing with Ecclesiastes was the only one published (Hamburg, 1765; Wilna, 1836). It is followed by an essay entitled "Ma'mar ha-Madda'", on religion and philosophy. Moses Mendelssohn strongly recommended this work in his "Bi'ur Millot ha-Higgayon" (§ 14).
