= Friedrich Matthäi =

German painter

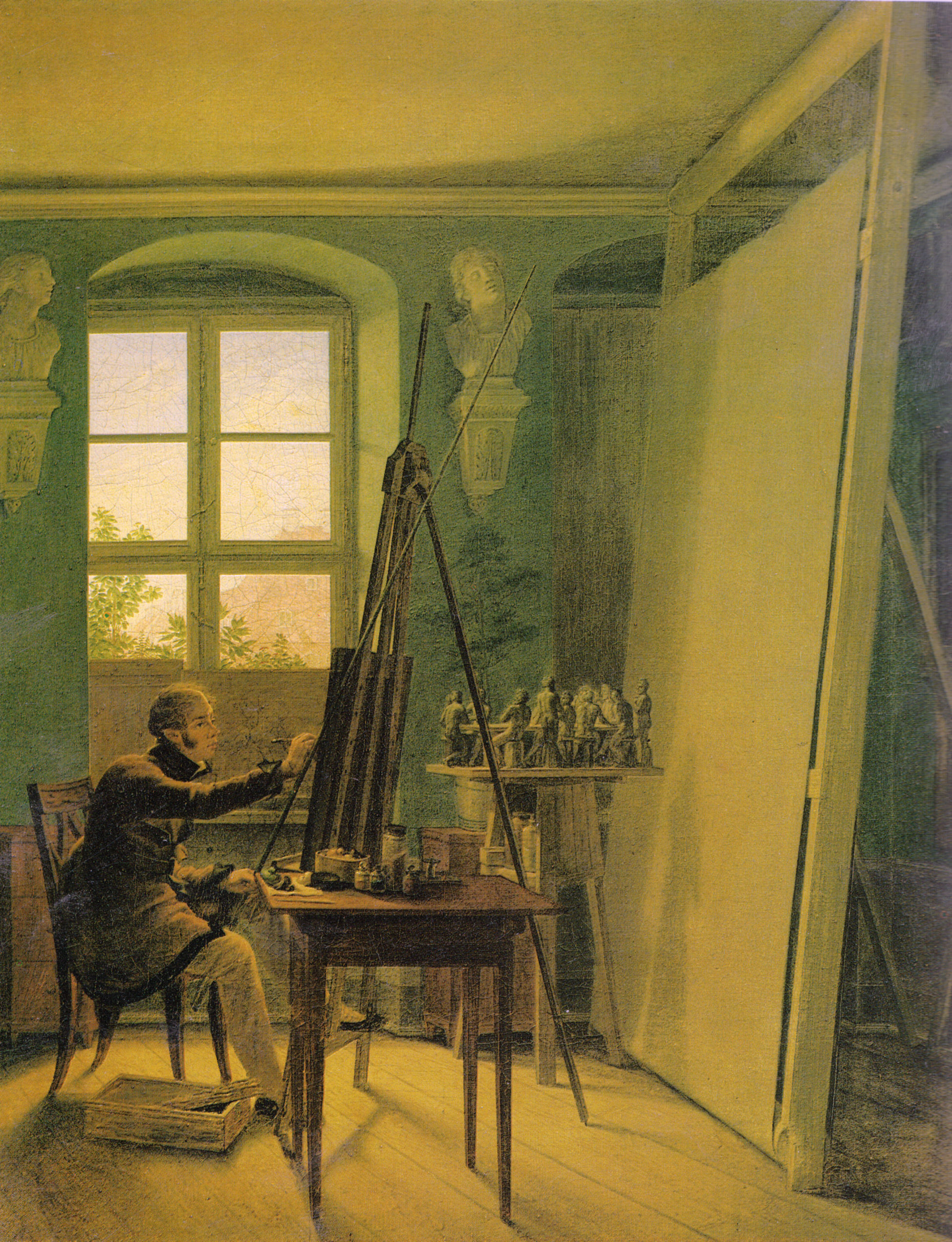
Matthäi in His Studio; by Georg Friedrich Kersting

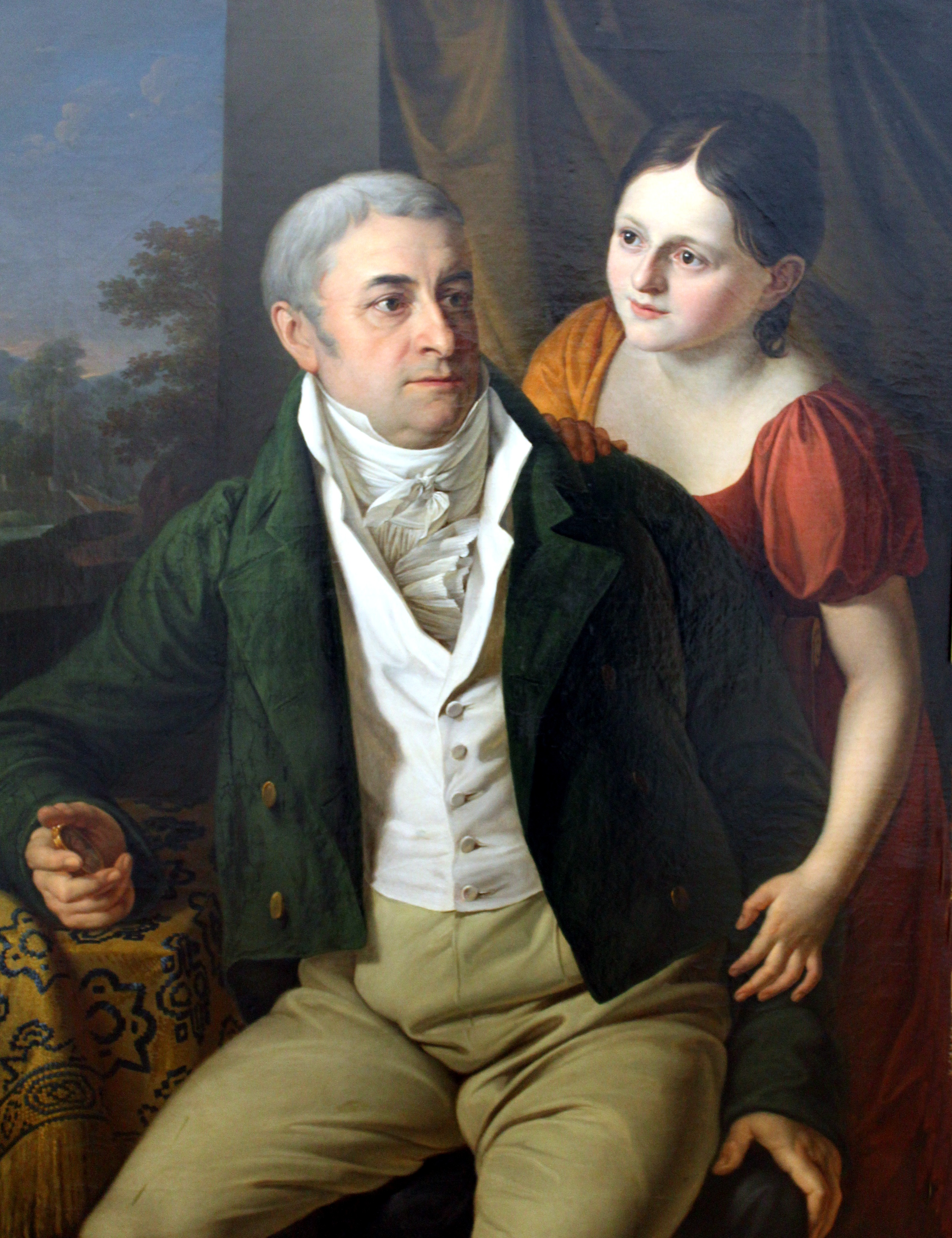
Portrait of the Leipzig merchant, Heinrich Gottlob Beyer (1756-1832), and his daughter, Marianne

Johann Friedrich Matthäi (3 March 1777 – 23 October 1845) was a German portrait and history painter.

== Life and work ==
He was born in Meissen. He was the son of Johann Gottlob Matthäi (1753–1832), a Meissen porcelain manufacturer, who later became an architect and sculptor. He initially studied at the Dresden Academy of Fine Arts with Giovanni Battista Casanova. This was followed by studies at the Academy of Fine Arts in Vienna with Heinrich Friedrich Füger.

After study trips and stays in Florence (1802–1804), and Rome (1805–1807), he became a teacher at the Dresden Academy and, in 1810, was named its director. In 1823, he was appointed Inspector (curator) for the Gemäldegalerie Alte Meister; becoming its director in 1834. He was one of the last exponents of pure Classicism in Germany. He died in Vienna, while returning from a trip to Italy. In Dresden.

He was a longtime member of the Dresden Freemasons lodge, "Zum goldenen Apfel" (The Golden Apple). His students at the Academy included the Nazareners Carl Eggers and Johannes Veit.
