= Philipp Veit =

German Romantic painter

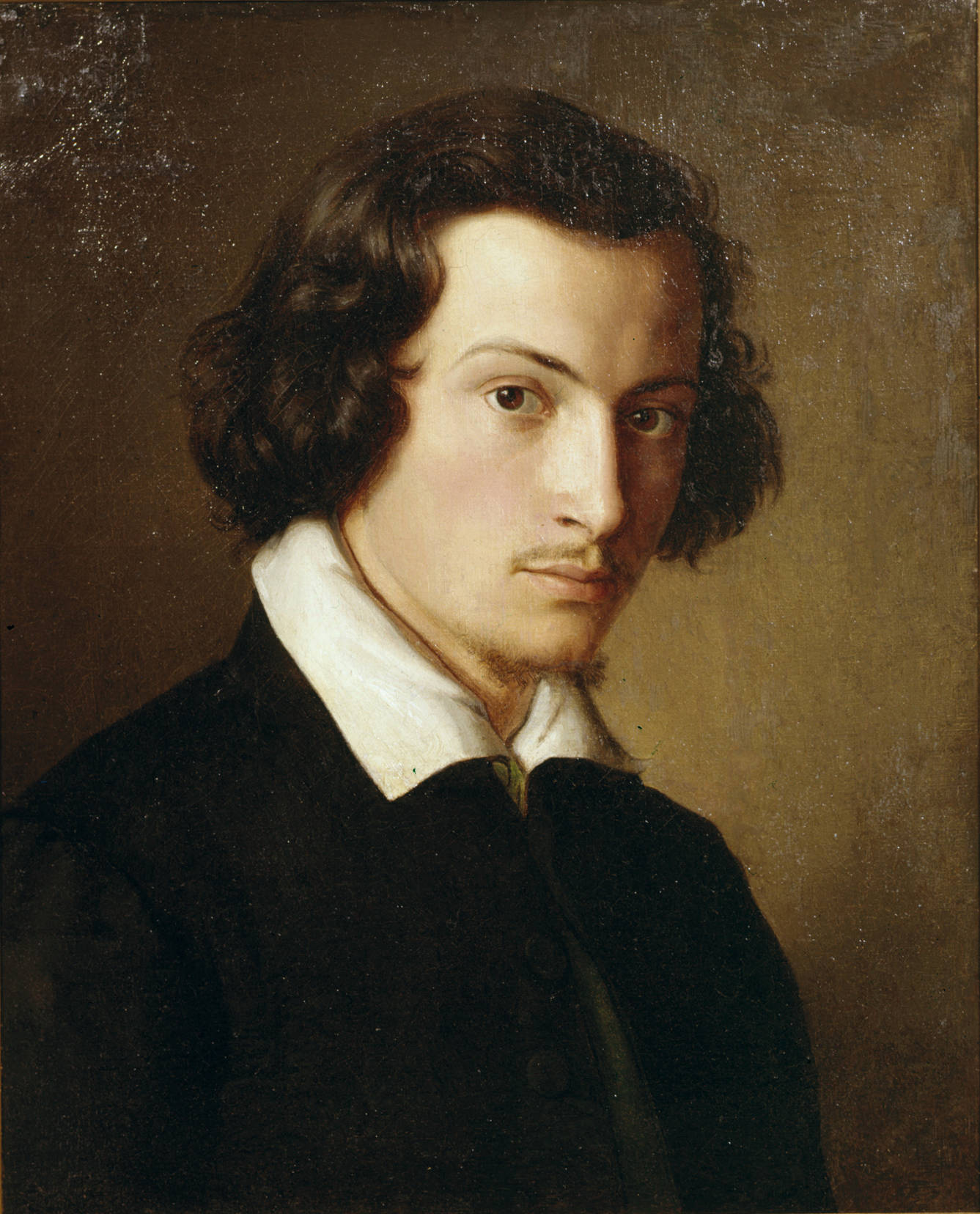
Self portrait, 1816

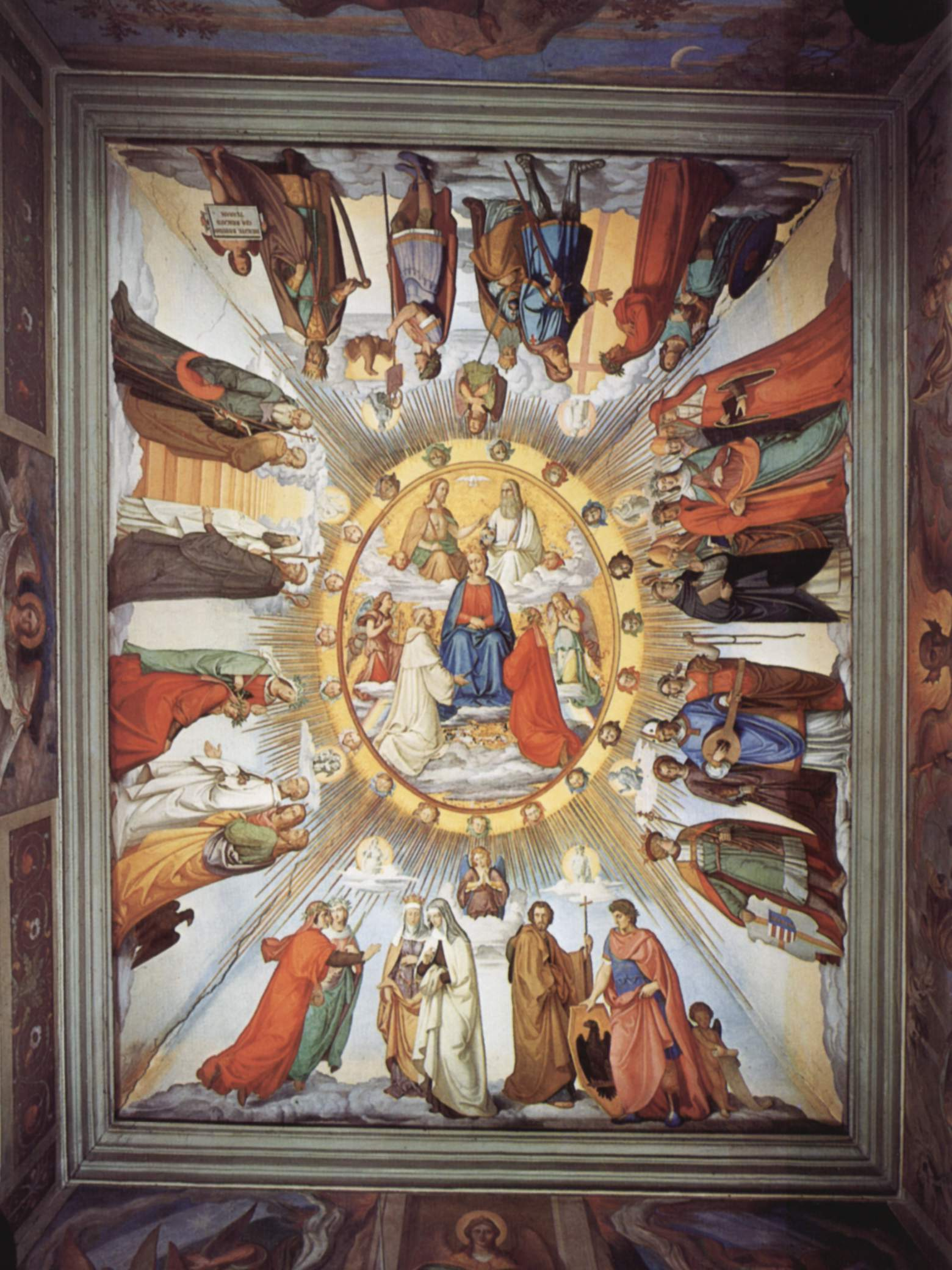
The Empyreum and Figures of the Celestial Spheres of Paradiso after Dante's Divine Comedy, Casino Massimo, Rome, fresco, 1817–1827

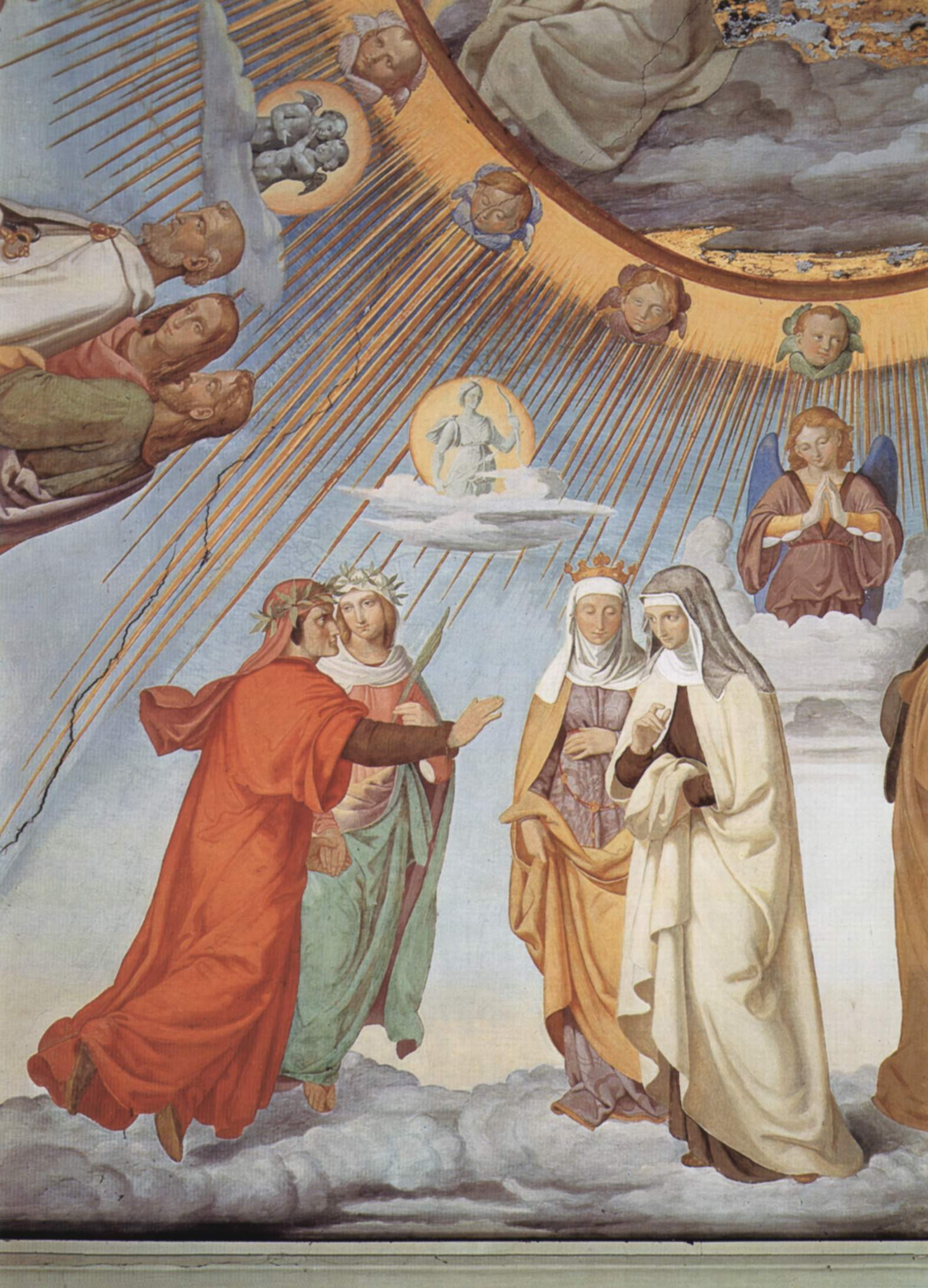
Paradiso, Canto III: Dante and Beatrice speak to Piccarda and Constance of Sicily, detail, Casino Massimo, Rome, fresco, 1817–1827

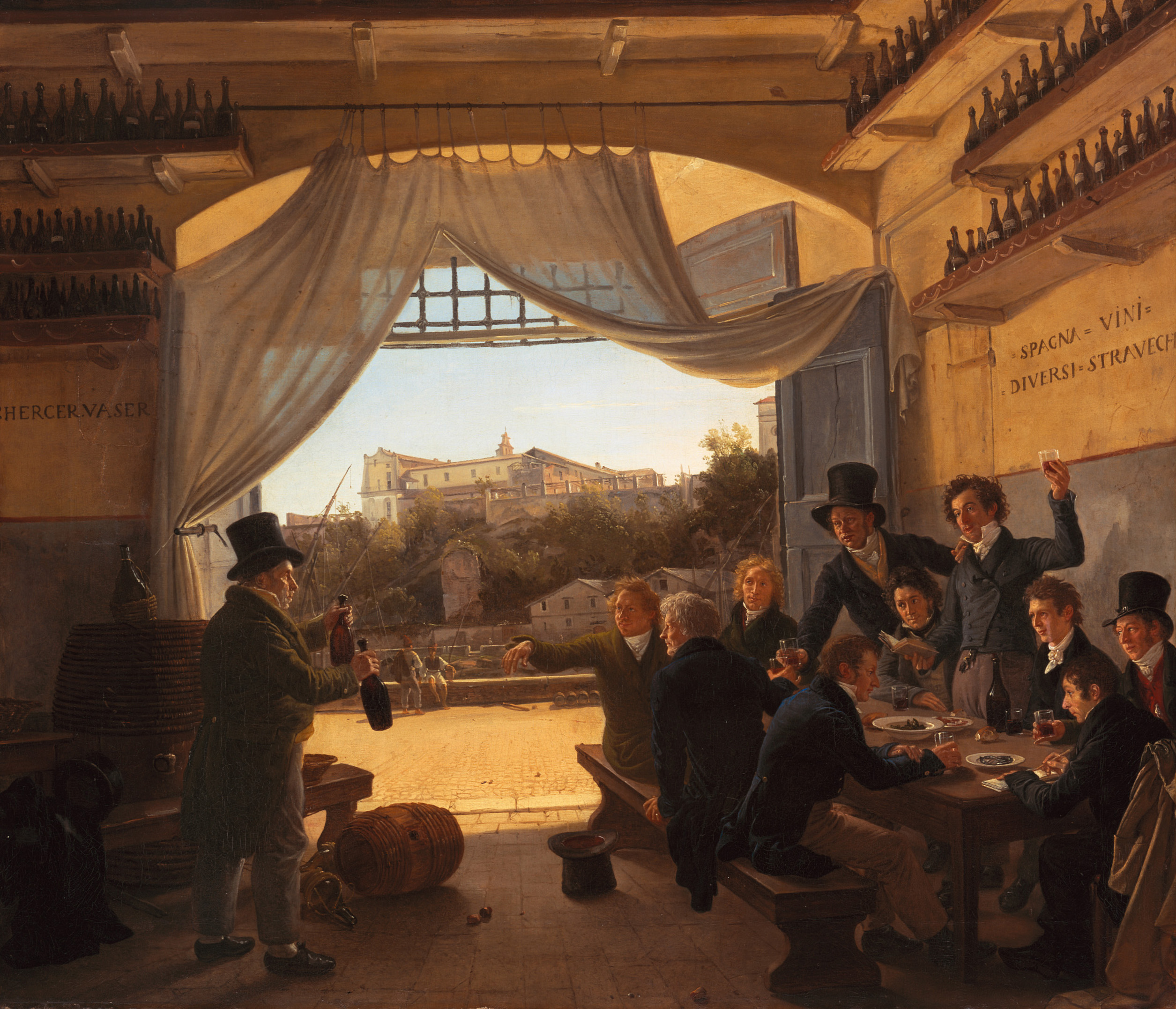
Franz Ludwig Catel, Crown Prince Ludwig in the Spanish Tavern in Rome, 1824

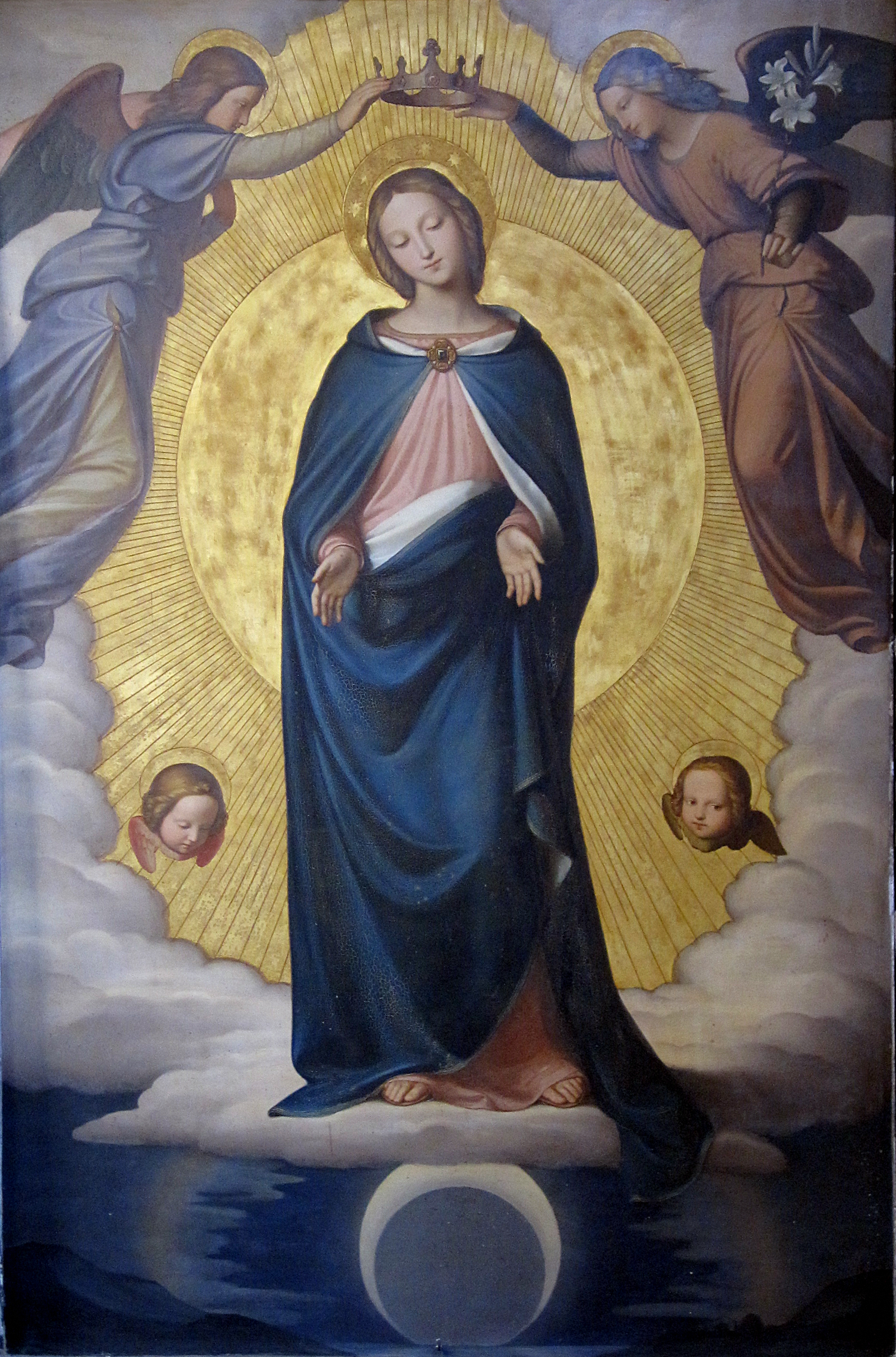
Immaculate conception, 1830, oil on canvas, Santa Trinità dei Monti, Rome

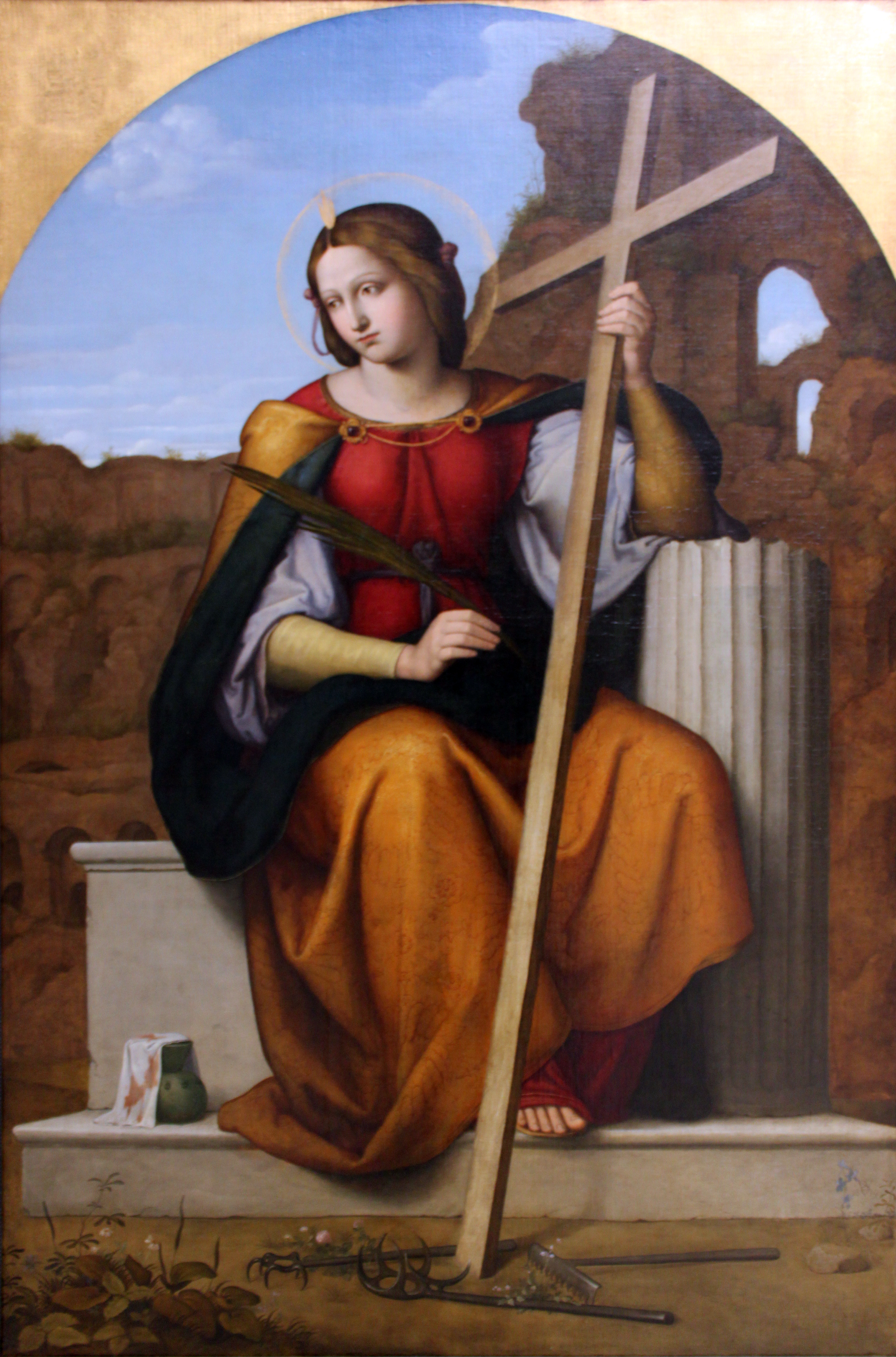
Allegory of Religion, 1819, oil on canvas, Alte Nationalgalerie, Staatliche Museen zu Berlin

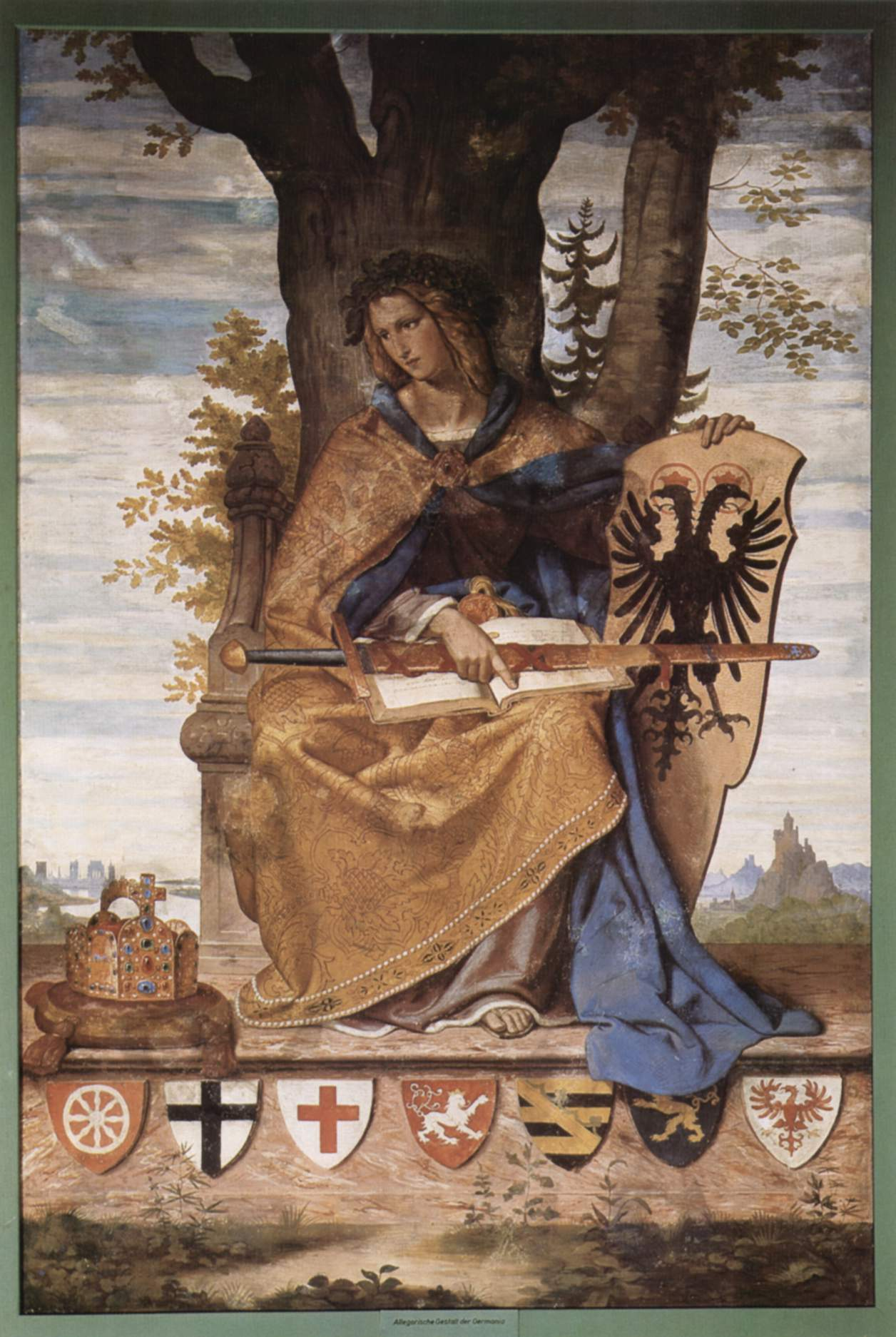
Germania, 1836

Philipp Veit (13 February 1793 – 18 December 1877) was a German Romantic painter and one of the main exponents of the Nazarene movement. It is to Veit that the credit of having been the first to revive the nearly forgotten technique of fresco painting is due.

== Biography ==
Veit was born in Berlin, Prussia. He was the son of a banker, Simon Veit and his wife Brendel, daughter of Moses Mendelssohn. After Veit's parents divorced in 1799, Veit initially stayed with his mother and lived with her and her new husband Friedrich Schlegel in Jena, Paris, and Cologne. In 1806, he returned to his father in Berlin and finished his schooling in the "Graues Kloster". From 1808 on, Veit received his first art education at the Royal Dresden Academy of Fine Arts, where he was taught by Friedrich Matthäi and Caspar David Friedrich, later in Vienna. Although a prodigious talent when it came to drawing, Veit was not comfortable with oil painting, for which reason in Vienna he took to the medium of watercolour. In Vienna, he made the acquaintance of Schlegel, and through him came to know several Viennese Romantics, one of whom was the poet and novelist Joseph von Eichendorff. He was strongly influenced by, and joined, the Nazarene movement in Rome, where he worked for some years before moving to Frankfurt.

In 1810, Veit converted to Catholicism together with his mother and his senior brother Johannes Veit. While participating in the struggle against Napoleon in 1813–14 (the German campaign of 1813 or War of the Sixth Coalition), first as a Lützower Jäger and part of the Lützow Free Corps, subsequently as a member of the Kleistsche Armeekorps, a corps led by Friedrich Graf Kleist von Nollendorf, and returning to Berlin for a short period, Veit became closer friends with the mentioned above poet Joseph Freiherr von Eichendorff and his own lieutenant Friedrich de la Motte Fouqué. Beginning in 1811, Veit was more teaching himself and finished a couple of portraits (Zichy-Vásonykeő, Julie Gräfin, lost; Franz Xaver von Baader and other members of Vienna's society and exponents of Romanticism). In 1815, he finished his first religious painting. Virgin with Christ and St John, a votive painting for the church of St James in Heiligenstadt, Vienna. The painting shows already close ties to the Nazarene movement and thus was inspired by the style of Pietro Perugino and Raphael.

== Rome ==
Rome was at that time of fundamental importance not only to artists of all stripes but—as the religious centre of Christianity—especially to artists prepared to re-create a spiritually inspired art, seeking for inspiration in the art of the Middle Ages and of the early Renaissance and living a nearly monastic existence similar to the medieval artist's workshop (with almost entirely Christian patrons), a reason why the artists' group was named according to the medieval guilds of painters or Lukasbund (Brotherhood of St Luke). In 1816, Veit joined the brotherhood which inhabited—or had occupied—the abandoned monastery of Sant'Isidoro. Since 1815, Johann Friedrich Overbeck, Peter von Cornelius, Friedrich Wilhelm Schadow, and later Veit frescoed a room in the "Casa Bartholdy" called Palazzo Zuccari on the Pincian Hill, which at that time was owned by Jakob Salomon Bartholdy, the Prussian Consul-General. The commission was given to Schadow and his young compatriots with the selected subject of Joseph and his brethren. While The Bloody Coat and Joseph in Prison were conferred to Schadow, Veit executed Potiphar's wife and the Seven Years of Great Abundance (in 1867, the frescoes were sold by the Zuccari family to the Alte Nationalgalerie in Berlin). In 1817, Veit received the commission for a fresco in the Museo Chiaramonti (part of the Vatican, set out in the long loggia which joins the Palace of Belvedere with the Vatican) with the allegorical subject of The Triumph of the Religion. A simultaneous replica (executed in oil on canvas) was exhibited in 1819 in the Palazzo Caffarelli on the Capitol Hill and is today part of the collection of the National Gallery in Berlin. Among the frescoes in the Casino Massimo, the second renowned example of composite work of Nazarene art in Rome, Veit executed scenes, e.g., of the Paradiso, at the ceiling of the Dante room, after Dante Alighieri's Divine Comedy. At the same time, around 1824, Veit was commissioned by the canon Christian Leberecht von Ampach to execute a painting with the subject of Christ at the Mount of Olives (Christus am Ölberg, finished 1825) for the Chapel of the Three Magi (Dreikönigskapelle) at Naumburg Cathedral in Germany. In 1821, Veit had married a young girl, Carolina Pulini (1807–1890), the daughter of his landlord, the sculptor Gioacchino Pulini (1777–1857). Carolina gave birth to five children: 1822 Dorothea, 1824 Theresa, 1826 Franziska, 1828 Maria Benedetta, and 1830 Friedrich.

Still in Rome in 1824, Veit was depicted as a member of German artists' circles in Franz Ludwig Catel's famous group portrait Crown Prince Ludwig in the Spanish Wine Tavern in Rome; Veit is said to be the person sitting between the two standing figures of von Wagner and Dr. Ringseis on the right side of the table. In 1829–30, Veit executed a Maria Immaculata for the Capella Orsini (a northern chapel) of Santa Trinità dei Monti, moreover the last work of his Roman period, with clear stylistic impact of Raphael and Perugino.

== Frankfurt ==
In October 1830, Veit arrived in Frankfurt on Main together with his wife Carolina and their five children. In Frankfurt on Main, where his most important works are preserved at the Städel, he was active from 1830 to 1843 as director of the art collections and as professor of painting. Among his most renowned pupils are Alfred Rethel and Eduard von Steinle. Around 1832, Veit decided for the first time to depict subjects of ancient mythology (e.g. Shield of Achilles) on the ceiling of one of the Städel's "Antikensäle". Other decorations for the old Städel building were the frescoes Die Einführung der Künste durch das Christentum in Deutschland (The Arts Being Introduced to Germany by Christianity) with the allegories of Germania and Italia. Originally, the three-parted fresco adorned the old premises of the Institute in Neue Mainzer Straße. Actually, it displays a conversion scene (through the sermon of Saint Boniface) in the centre-panel while the allegories of Germania and Italia on the side panels represent secular and spiritual power. It was removed in 1877 and transferred into the new building. On the occasion of the national assembly of 1848, for which St. Paul's Church of Frankfurt on Main was used as an assembly hall, Veit executed a second version of the Germania-painting (oil on canvas) which hung in full view on the wall above the chair people as an appeal to all German states to create a unitary constitution during the first all-German Parliament. Between 1840 and 1852, four so-called portraits of German rulers (which were, actually, pictures of Holy Roman emperors) were painted by Veit: Friedrich II. (Frederick II, Holy Roman Emperor), Heinrich VII. (Henry VII, Holy Roman Emperor), Otto der Große (Otto the Great) and Karl der Große (Charlemagne) as donation for the "Kaisersaal" (Emperor's Hall) in the City Hall of Frankfurt.

From 1853 till his death in 1877 he held the post of director of the municipal gallery in Mainz. Like his fellow Nazarenes he was more draughtsman than painter, and though his sense of colour was stronger than that of Overbeck or Cornelius, his works are generally more of the nature of coloured cartoons than of paintings in the modern sense.

Among Veit's other principal works is his Assumption in the Frankfurt Cathedral, while the Alte Nationalgalerie of Berlin has his painting of The Two Marys at the Sepulchre. Veit died in Mainz.

== Paintings by Philipp Veit ==
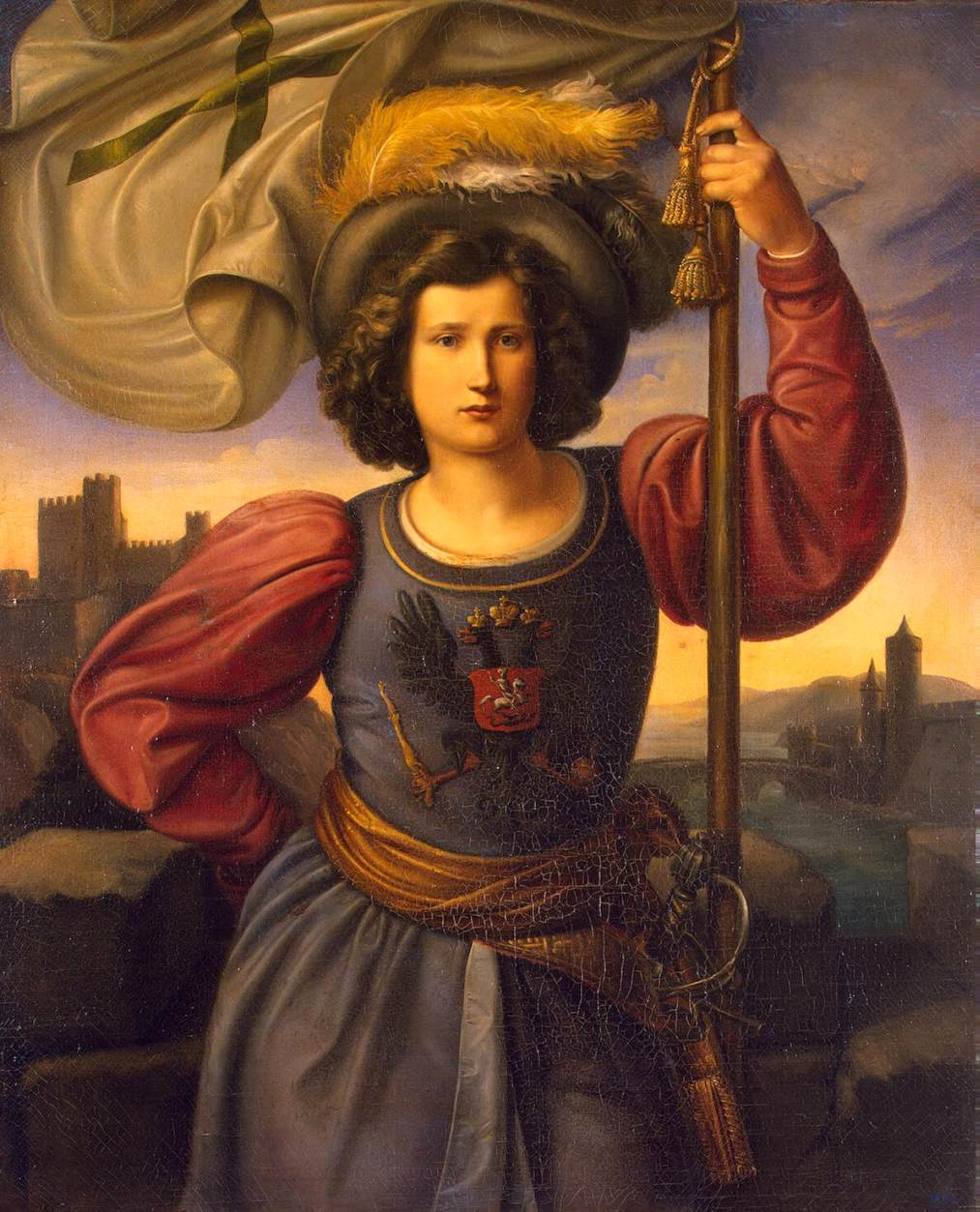
Allegory of Russia, 1840s, oil on canvas, 121 x 91 cm, Hermitage Museum, Saint Petersburg

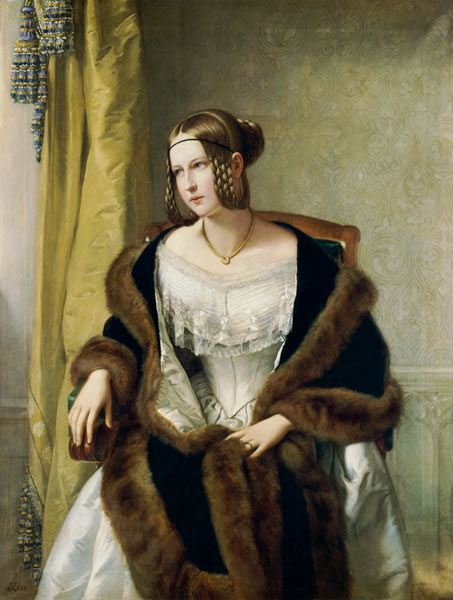
Marie Freifrau von Bernus, geborene du Fay (1819–1887), ca. 1838, oil on canvas, 128,6 x 97,2 cm, Städel Museum, Frankfurt

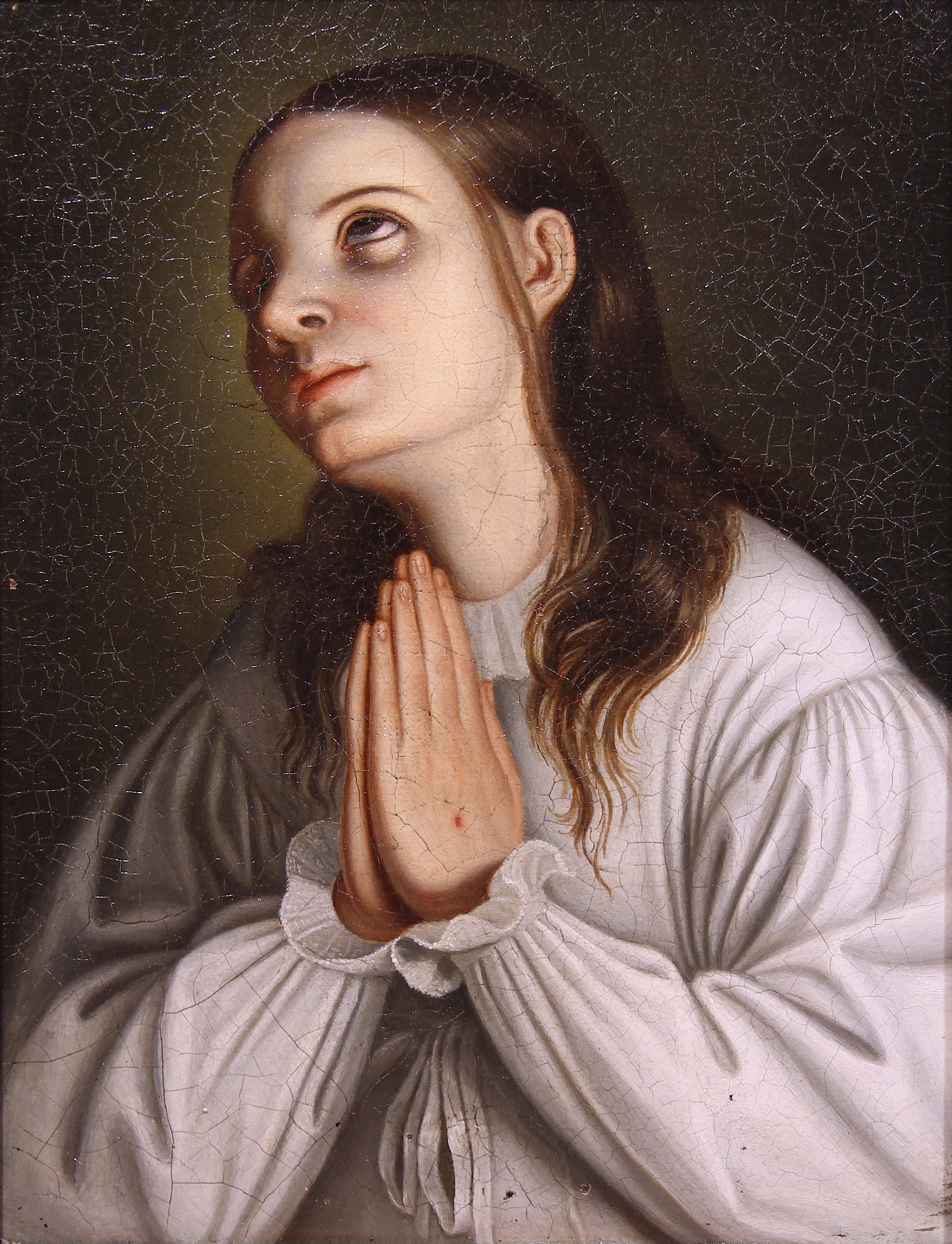
Maria von Mörl (1812–1868)
