= Joseph Mendelssohn =

German Jewish banker

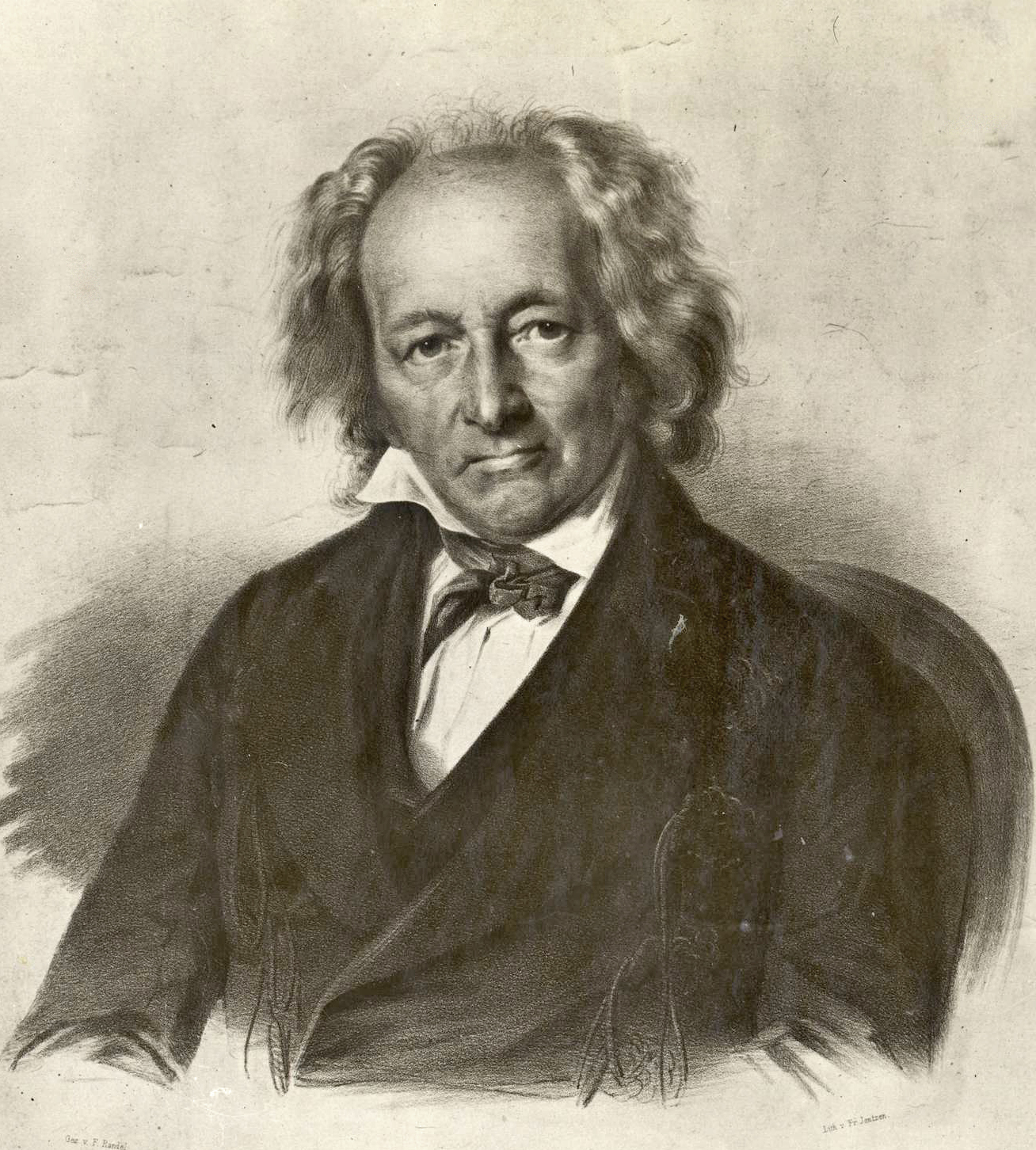
- Born: 11 August 1770; Berlin, Kingdom of Prussia, Holy Roman Empire
- Died: 24 November 1848 (aged 78); Berlin, Kingdom of Prussia
- Occupation: Banker
- Father: Moses Mendelssohn

Joseph Mendelssohn (11 August 1770 – 24 November 1848) was a German Jewish banker.

He was the eldest son of the influential philosopher Moses Mendelssohn. In 1795, he founded his own banking house. In 1804, his younger brother, Abraham Mendelssohn Bartholdy, the father of the composers Fanny and Felix Mendelssohn, joined the company. The bank Mendelssohn & Co. continued under the control of the Mendelssohn family and would rise to prominence during the 19th century, becoming one of the most important and influential German banks during the early 20th century.

== See also ==
- List of people from Berlin
