= Moses Mendelssohn =

German philosopher and theologian (1729–1786)

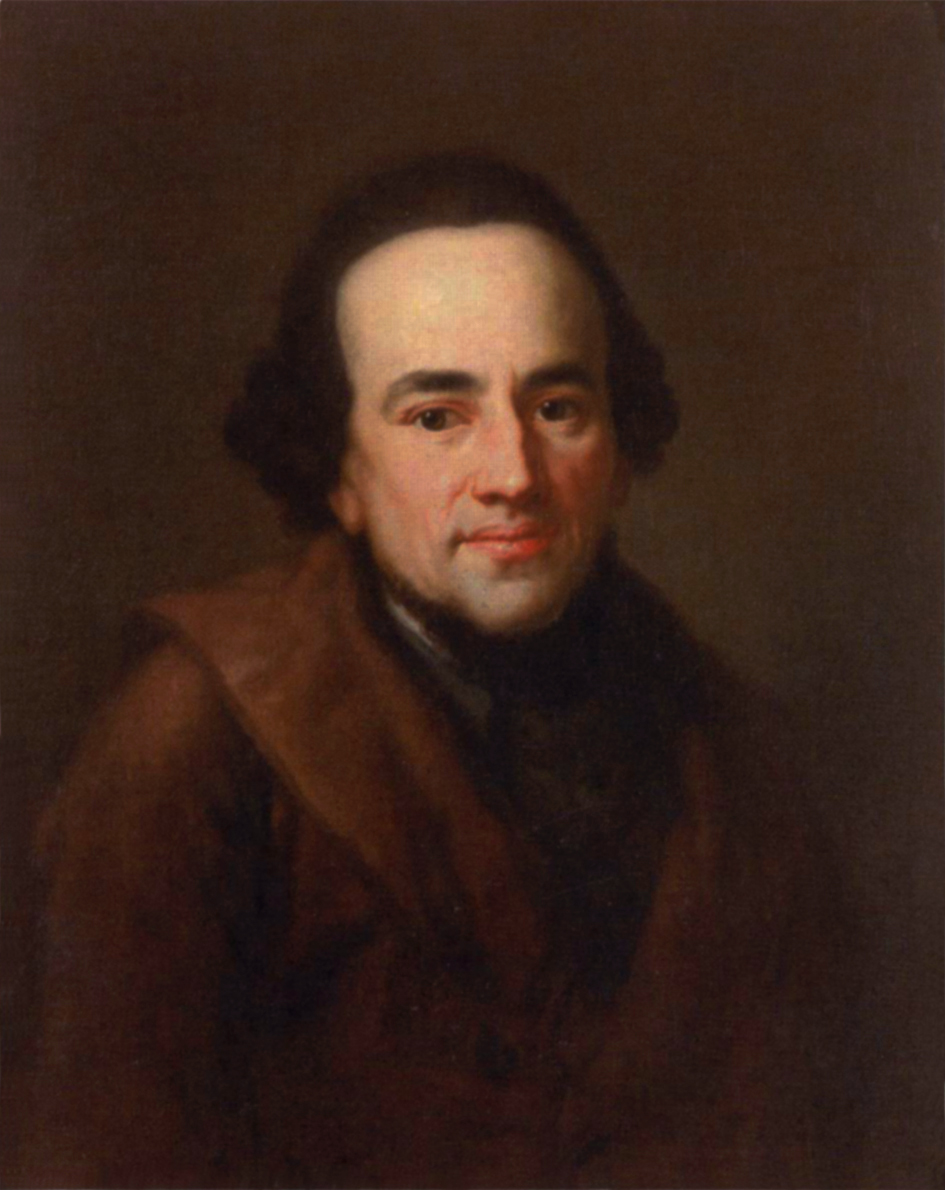
- Portrait by Anton Graff (1773)
- Born: 6 September 1729; Dessau, Anhalt-Dessau, Holy Roman Empire
- Died: 4 January 1786 (aged 56); Berlin, Kingdom of Prussia, Holy Roman Empire
- Spouse: Fromet Guggenheim (m. 1762)
- Children: Joseph; Abraham; Nathan; Brendel; Recha; Henriette

Philosophical work
- Era: 18th-century philosophy
- Main interests: Metaphysics · Philosophy of religion

Moses Mendelssohn (Note: /ˈmɛndəlsən, -zoʊn/ MEN-dəl-sən, -zohn; German: [ˈmɛndl̩szoːn]) (6 September 1729 (Note: Hebrew calendar 12 Elul 5489) – 4 January 1786) was a German-Jewish philosopher and theologian. His writings and ideas on Jews and the Jewish religion and identity were a central element in the development of the Haskalah, or 'Jewish Enlightenment' of the eighteenth and nineteenth centuries. Born to a poor Jewish family in Dessau, Principality of Anhalt, and originally destined for a rabbinical career, Mendelssohn educated himself in German thought and literature. Through his writings on philosophy and religion he came to be regarded as a leading cultural figure of his time by both Christian and Jewish inhabitants of German-speaking Europe and beyond. His involvement in the Berlin textile industry formed the foundation of his family's wealth.

His descendants include the composers Fanny and Felix Mendelssohn; Felix's son, chemist Paul Mendelssohn Bartholdy; Fanny's grandsons, Paul and Kurt Hensel; and the founders of the Mendelssohn & Co. banking house.

== Life ==
=== Youth ===
Moses Mendelssohn was born in Dessau to Mendel Heymann and Bela Rachel Wahl. His father's name was Mendel, but Moses and his brother Saul were the first to adopt the surname Mendelssohn ("Mendel's son"). Moses's son Abraham Mendelssohn wrote in 1829 (to Felix), "My father felt that the name Moses Ben Mendel Dessau would handicap him in gaining the needed access to those who had the better education at their disposal. Without any fear that his own father would take offense, my father assumed the name Mendelssohn. The change, though a small one, was decisive."

Mendel was an impoverished sofer—a scribe for Torah scrolls and other religious documents—and his son Moses in his boyhood developed curvature of the sinal column. Moses' early education was provided by his father and by the local rabbi, David Fränkel, who, besides teaching him the Torah and Talmud, introduced to him the philosophy of Maimonides. In 1743 Fränkel received a call to Berlin, and a few months later Moses followed him. Moses, age 14, "entered Berlin at the Rosenthaler Tor, the only gate in the city wall through which Jews (and cattle) were allowed to pass." "Mendelssohn enrolled in Frankel's exacting seminary, where the program consisted of unending rote repetitions of early medieval texts, interpretations thereof, elaborations of Talmudic law, and copious commentary accumulated over the centuries."

A refugee Polish Jew, Israel Zamosz, taught him mathematics, and a young Jewish physician taught him Latin. He was, however, mainly self-taught. He learned to spell and to philosophize at the same time (according to the historian Graetz). With his scanty earnings he bought a Latin copy of John Locke's An Essay Concerning Human Understanding, and mastered it with the aid of a Latin dictionary. He then made the acquaintance of Aaron Solomon Gumperz, who taught him basic French and English. In 1750, a wealthy Jewish silk-merchant, Isaac Bernhard, appointed him to teach his children. Mendelssohn soon won the confidence of Bernhard, who made the young student successively his bookkeeper and his partner.

It was possibly Gumperz who introduced Mendelssohn to Gotthold Ephraim Lessing in 1754, who became one of his greatest friends. It is said that the first time Mendelssohn met Lessing, they played chess. In Lessing's play Nathan the Wise Nathan and the character Saladin first meet during a game of chess. Lessing had recently produced the drama Die Juden, whose moral was that a Jew can possess nobility of character. This notion was, in the contemporary Berlin of Frederick the Great, generally ridiculed as untrue. Lessing found in Mendelssohn the realization of his dream. Within a few months, the two became closely intellectually allied. Lessing also brought Mendelssohn to public attention for the first time: Mendelssohn had written an essay attacking Germans' neglect of their native philosophers (principally Gottfried Leibniz), and lent the manuscript to Lessing. Without consulting the author, Lessing published Mendelssohn's Philosophical Conversations (Philosophische Gespräche) anonymously in 1755. In the same year there appeared in Danzig (now Gdańsk, Poland) an anonymous satire, Pope a Metaphysician (Pope ein Metaphysiker), which turned out to be the joint work of Lessing and Mendelssohn.

=== Early prominence as philosopher and critic ===
Mendelssohn became the leading spirit of Friedrich Nicolai's important literary undertakings, the Bibliothek and the Literaturbriefe, and ran some risk by criticizing the poems of Frederick II, King of Prussia; Frederick’s good nature kept him out of trouble. In 1762 he married Fromet Guggenheim, who survived him by twenty-six years. In the year following his marriage Mendelssohn won the prize offered by the Berlin Academy for an essay on the application of mathematical proofs to metaphysics, On Evidence in the Metaphysical Sciences; among the competitors were Thomas Abbt and Immanuel Kant, who came second. In October 1763 the king granted Mendelssohn, but not his wife or children, the privilege of Protected Jew (Schutzjude), which assured his right to undisturbed residence in Berlin.

As a result of his correspondence with Abbt, Mendelssohn resolved to write on the immortality of the soul. At the time, materialist ideas were widespread, and belief in immortality had declined. At this favourable juncture appeared Phädon oder über die Unsterblichkeit der Seele (Phaedo or On the Immortality of Souls; 1767). Modelled on Plato's dialogue of the same name, Mendelssohn's work possessed some of the charm of its Greek exemplar and impressed the German world with its beauty and lucidity of style. Phaedo was an immediate success, and besides being one of the most widely read books of its time in German was speedily translated into several European languages, including English. The author was hailed as the "German Plato", or the "German Socrates"; royal and other aristocratic friends showered attentions on him, and it was said that "no stranger who came to Berlin failed to pay his personal respects to the German Socrates."

=== Lavater ===
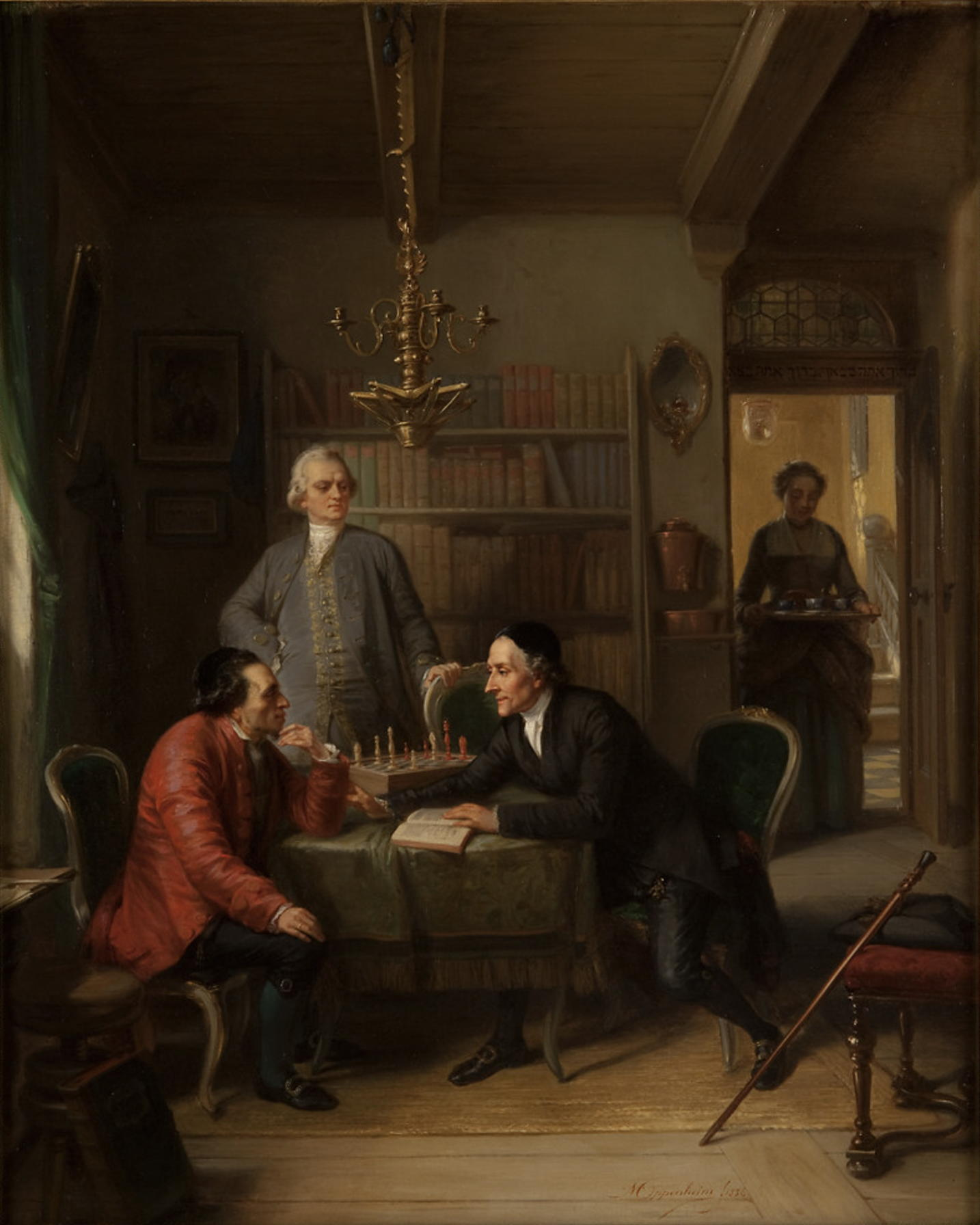
Mendelssohn (in red coat), Lavater (at right) and Lessing (standing), in an imaginary portrait by the Jewish artist Moritz Daniel Oppenheim (1856), Magnes Collection of Jewish Art and Life

So far, Mendelssohn had devoted his talents to philosophy and criticism; now, however, an incident turned the current of his life in the direction of the cause of Judaism. In April 1763, Johann Kaspar Lavater, then a young theology-student from Zurich, made a trip to Berlin, where he visited the already famous Jewish philosopher with some companions. They insisted on Mendelssohn telling them his views on Jesus and managed to get from him the statement, that, provided the historical Jesus had kept himself and his theology strictly within limits of orthodox Judaism, Mendelssohn "respected the morality of Jesus' character." Six years later, in October 1769, Lavater sent Mendelssohn his German translation of Charles Bonnet's Inquiries concerning Christianity, with a preface where he publicly challenged Mendelssohn to refute Bonnet or if he could not then to "do what wisdom, the love of truth and honesty must bid him, what a Socrates would have done if he had read the book and found it unanswerable." Mendelssohn answered in an open letter in December 1769: "Suppose there were living among my contemporaries a Confucius or a Solon, I could, according to the principles of my faith, love and admire the great man without falling into the ridiculous idea that I must convert a Solon or a Confucius." The ongoing public controversy cost Mendelssohn much time, energy and strength.

Lavater later described Mendelssohn in his book on physiognomy, Physiognomische Fragmente zur Beförderung der Menschenkenntnis und Menschenliebe (1775–1778), as "a companionable, brilliant soul, with piercing eyes, the body of an Aesop [who was traditionally considered ugly]—a man of keen insight, exquisite taste and wide erudition [...] frank and open-hearted"—ending his public praise with the wish of Mendelssohn recognizing, "together with Plato and Moses... the crucified glory of Christ." When, in 1775 the Swiss-German Jews, faced with the threat of expulsion, turned to Mendelssohn and asked him to intervene on their behalf with "his friend" Lavater, Lavater, after receiving Mendelssohn's letter, promptly and effectively secured their stay.

=== Illness ===
In March 1771 Mendelssohn's health deteriorated so badly that Marcus Elieser Bloch, his doctor, decided his patient had to give up philosophy, at least temporarily. After a short and restless sleep one evening, Mendelssohn found himself incapable of moving and had the feeling of something lashing his neck with fiery rods, his heart was palpitating and he was in an extreme anxiety, yet fully conscious. This spell was then broken suddenly by some external stimulation. Attacks of this kind recurred. The cause of his disease was ascribed to the mental stress due to his theological controversy with Lavater. However, this sort of attack, in milder form, had presumably occurred many years earlier. Bloch diagnosed the disease as due to 'congestion of blood in the brain' (a meaningless diagnosis in modern medical practice as such congestion is anatomically impossible), and after some controversy this diagnosis was also accepted by the famous Hanoverian court physician, Johann Georg Ritter von Zimmermann, an admirer of Mendelssohn. In retrospect, his illness might be diagnosed as a heart-rhythm-problem (such as atrial fibrillation) and/or a mild form of familial dysautonomia, a hereditary disease of Ashkenazi Jews, which often brings with it a curvature of the spine and epilepsy-like symptoms in times of stress.

Mendelssohn was treated with China bark, blood lettings on the foot, leeches applied to the ears, enemas, foot baths, lemonade and mainly vegetarian food. "No mental stress whatsoever" was ordered. However, although he remained subject to periods of setback, he eventually recovered sufficiently to write the major works of his later career.

=== Death ===
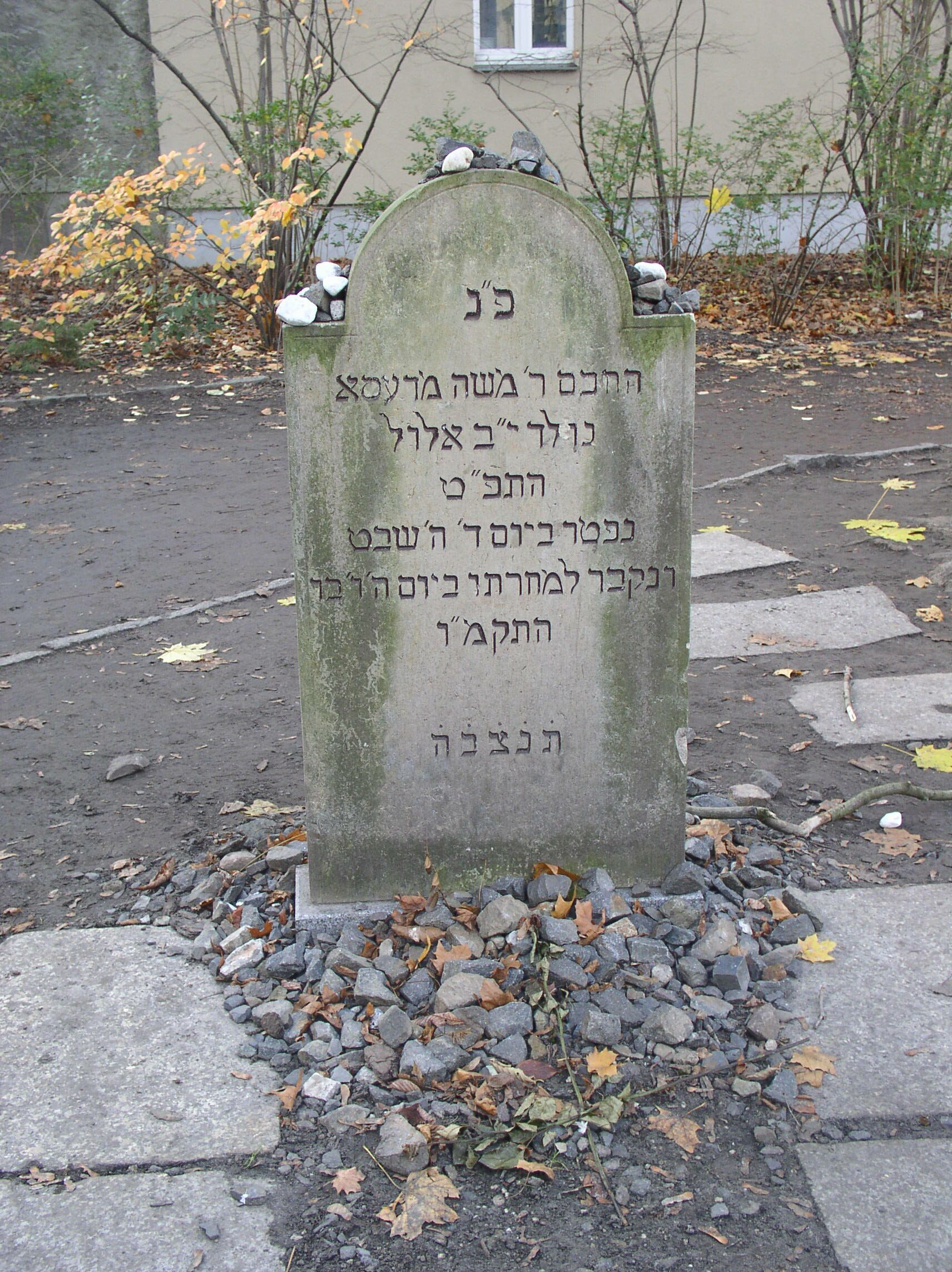
Moses Mendelssohn's (reconstructed) grave in Berlin

Mendelssohn died on 4 January 1786 as the result (it was thought at the time) of a cold contracted while carrying a manuscript (his reply to Jacobi, titled To Lessing's Friends (An die Freunde Lessings)) to his publishers on New Year's Eve; Jacobi was held by some to have been responsible for his death. He was buried in the Jewish Cemetery of Berlin. The translation of the Hebrew inscription on his gravestone (see picture to the right) reads: "H[ere] r[ests] / the wise R[eb] Moses of Dessau / born on the 12th of Elul 5489 [6 September 1729] / died on Wednesday the 5th of Shevat [4 January] / and buried the next morning on Thursday 6th/ 5546 [5 January 1786] / M[ay] H[is] S[oul be] B[ound up in the] B[ond of eternal] L[ife]". Although the cemetery was largely destroyed during the Nazi era, after German reunification, in 2007–08, it was reestablished with monuments to its past, including a recreation of Mendelssohn's gravestone.

== Philosophical work ==
=== Works on religion and civil society ===
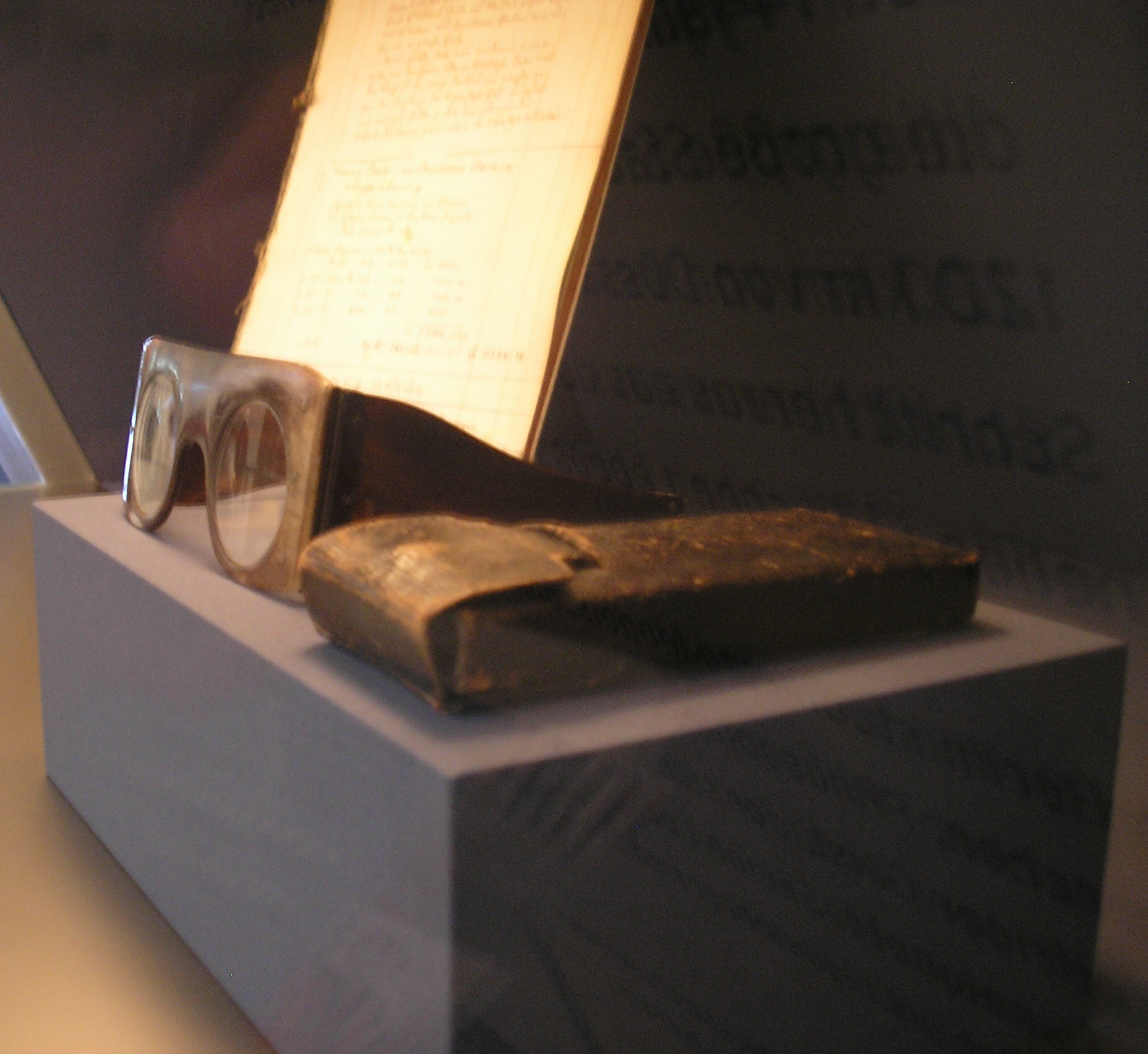
Moses Mendelssohn's glasses, in the Jewish Museum, Berlin

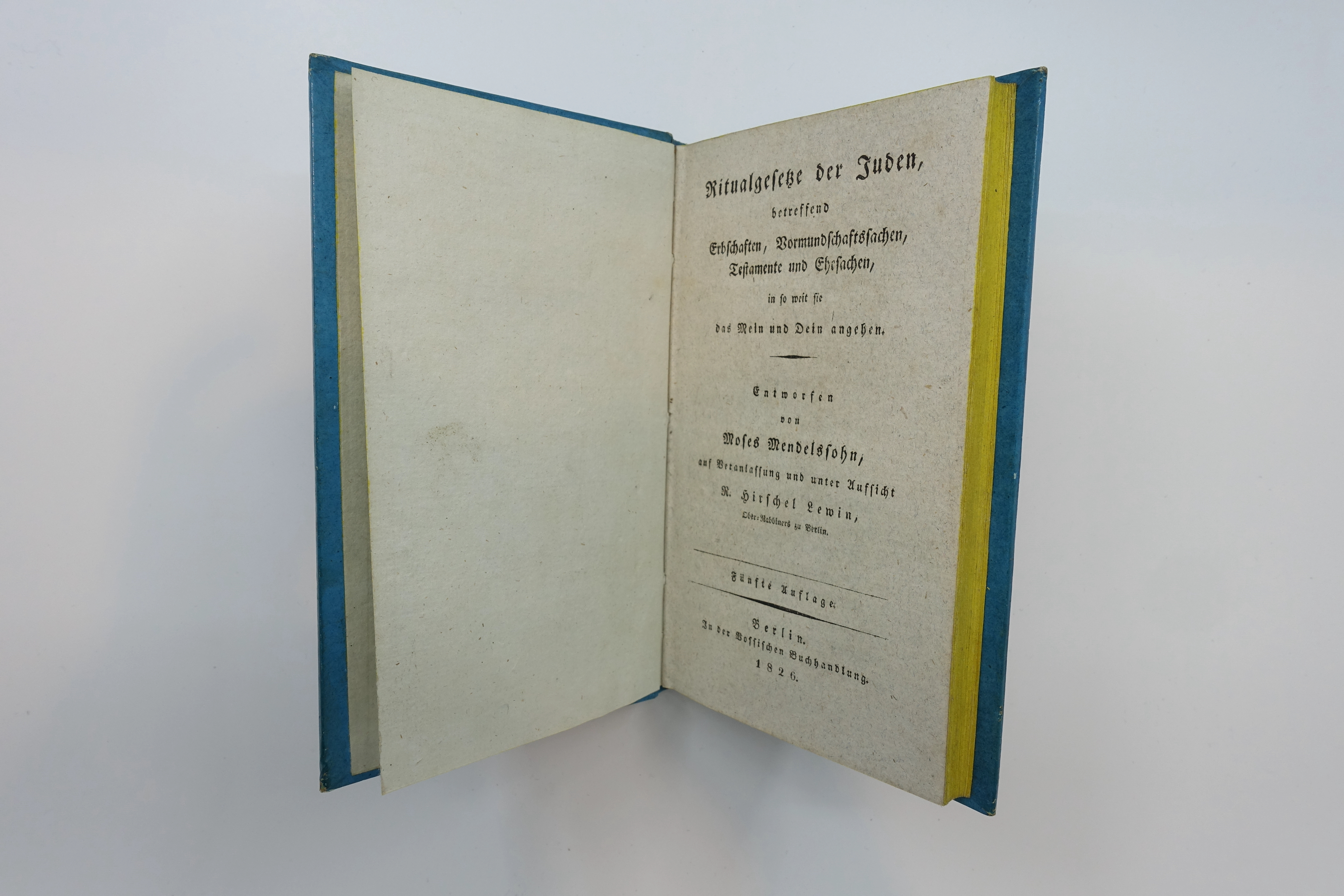
Mendelssohn’s Ritual Laws of the Jews, 1826 edition, in the collection of the Jewish Museum of Switzerland.

It was after the breakdown of his health that Mendelssohn decided to "dedicate the remains of my strength for the benefit of my children or a goodly portion of my nation"—which he did by trying to bring the Jews closer to "culture, from which my nation, alas! is kept in such a distance, that one might well despair of ever overcoming it". One of the means of doing this was by "giving them a better translation of the holy books than they previously had". To this end Mendelssohn undertook his German translation of the Pentateuch and other parts of the Bible. This work was called the Bi'ur (the explanation) (1783) and also contained a commentary, only that on Exodus having been written by Mendelssohn himself. The translation was in an elegant High German, designed to allow Jews to learn the language faster. Most of the German Jews in that period spoke Yiddish and many were literate in Hebrew (the language of Jewish scripture, liturgy, and scholarship). The commentary was also thoroughly rabbinic, quoting mainly from medieval exegetes but also from Talmud-era midrashim. Mendelssohn is also believed to be behind the foundation of the first modern public school for Jewish boys, "Freyschule für Knaben", in Berlin in 1778 by one of his most ardent pupils, David Friedländer, where both religious and worldly subjects were taught.

Mendelssohn also tried to better the Jews' situation in general by furthering their rights and acceptance. He induced Christian Wilhelm von Dohm to publish in 1781 his work, On the Civil Amelioration of the Condition of the Jews, which played a significant part in the rise of tolerance. Mendelssohn himself published a German translation of the Vindiciae Judaeorum by Menasseh Ben Israel.

The interest caused by these actions led Mendelssohn to publish his most important contribution to the problems connected with the position of Judaism in a Gentile world. This was Jerusalem (1783; Eng. trans. 1838 and 1852). It is a forcible plea for freedom of conscience, described by Kant as "an irrefutable book". Mendelssohn wrote:

Brothers, if you care for true piety, let us not feign agreement, where diversity is evidently the plan and purpose of Providence. None of us thinks and feels exactly like his fellow man: why do we wish to deceive each other with delusive words?

Its basic thrust is that the state has no right to interfere with the religion of its citizens, Jews included. While it proclaims the mandatory character of Jewish law for all Jews (including, based on Mendelssohn's understanding of the New Testament, those converted to Christianity), it does not grant the rabbinate the right to punish Jews for deviating from it. He maintained that Judaism was less a "divine need, than a revealed life". Jerusalem concludes with the cry "Love truth, love peace!"—in a quote from Zacharias 8:19.

Kant called this "the proclamation of a great reform, which, however, will be slow in manifestation and in progress, and which will affect not only your people but others as well". Mendelssohn asserted the pragmatic principle of the possible plurality of truths: that just as various nations need different constitutions—to one a monarchy, to another a republic, may be the most congenial to the national genius—so individuals may need different religions. The test of religion is its effect on conduct. This is the moral of Lessing's Nathan the Wise (Nathan der Weise), the hero of which is undoubtedly Mendelssohn, and in which the parable of the three rings is the epitome of the pragmatic position.

To Mendelssohn, his theory represented a strengthening bond to Judaism. But in the first part of the 19th century, the criticism of Jewish dogmas and traditions was associated with a firm adhesion to the older Jewish mode of living. Reason was applied to beliefs, the historic consciousness to life. Modern reform in Judaism has parted to some extent from this conception. In the view of the German writer Heinrich Heine, "as Luther had overthrown the Papacy, so Mendelssohn overthrew the Talmud; and he did so after the same fashion, namely, by rejecting tradition, by declaring the Bible to be the source of religion, and by translating the most important part of it. By these means he shattered Judaic, as Luther had shattered Christian, catholicism; for the Talmud is, in fact, the catholicism of the Jews."

=== Later years and legacy ===
Mendelssohn grew ever more famous, and counted among his friends many of the great figures of his time. But his final years were overshadowed and saddened by the so-called pantheism controversy. Ever since his friend Lessing had died, he had wanted to write an essay or a book about his character. When Friedrich Heinrich Jacobi, an acquaintance of both men, heard of Mendelssohn's project, he stated that he had confidential information about Lessing being a "Spinozist", which, in these years, was regarded as being more or less synonymous with "atheist"—something which Lessing was accused of being anyway by religious circles.

This led to an exchange of letters between Jacobi and Mendelssohn which showed they had hardly any common ground. Mendelssohn then published his Morgenstunden oder Vorlesungen über das Dasein Gottes (Morning hours or lectures about God's existence), seemingly a series of lectures to his oldest son, his son-in-law and a young friend, usually held "in the morning hours", in which he explained his personal philosophical world-view, his own understanding of Spinoza and Lessing's "purified" (geläutert) pantheism. But almost simultaneously with the publication of this book in 1785, Jacobi published extracts of his and Mendelssohn's letters as Briefe über die Lehre Spinozas, stating publicly that Lessing was a self-confessed "pantheist" in the sense of "atheist". Mendelssohn was thus drawn into a poisonous literary controversy, and found himself attacked from all sides, including former friends or acquaintances such as Johann Gottfried von Herder and Johann Georg Hamann. Mendelssohn's contribution to this debate, To Lessing's Friends (An die Freunde Lessings) (1786), was his last work, completed a few days before his death.

Mendelssohn's complete works have been published in 19 volumes (in the original languages) (Stuttgart, 1971 ff., ed. A. Altmann and others)

== Family ==
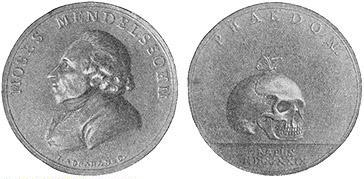
Medal honoring Mendelssohn

Mendelssohn had six children, of whom only his second-oldest daughter, Recha, and his eldest son, Joseph, retained the Jewish faith. His sons were: Joseph (founder of the Mendelssohn banking house and a friend and benefactor of Alexander von Humboldt), Abraham (who married Lea Salomon and was the father of Fanny and Felix Mendelssohn), and Nathan (a mechanical engineer of considerable repute). His daughters were Brendel (later Dorothea; the wife of Simon Veit and mother of Philipp Veit, subsequently the mistress, and then wife, of Friedrich von Schlegel), Recha, and Henriette, all gifted women. Recha's only grandson (son of Heinrich Beer, brother of the composer Giacomo Meyerbeer), was born and educated as a Jew, but died very young, together with his parents, apparently from an epidemic. Joseph Mendelssohn's son Alexander (1798-1871) was the last male descendant of Moses Mendelssohn to practice Judaism.

== In popular culture ==
- Dutch comic artist Typex drew a 2022 biographical graphic novel about Moses Mendelssohn, titled Moishe.

== See also ==
- Biurists
- Fridolin Friedmann
- Sara Grotthuis
- Markus Herz
- Heinrich Josefsohn
- The Jewish question
- Salomon Maimon
