= Mendelssohn family =

German Jewish family

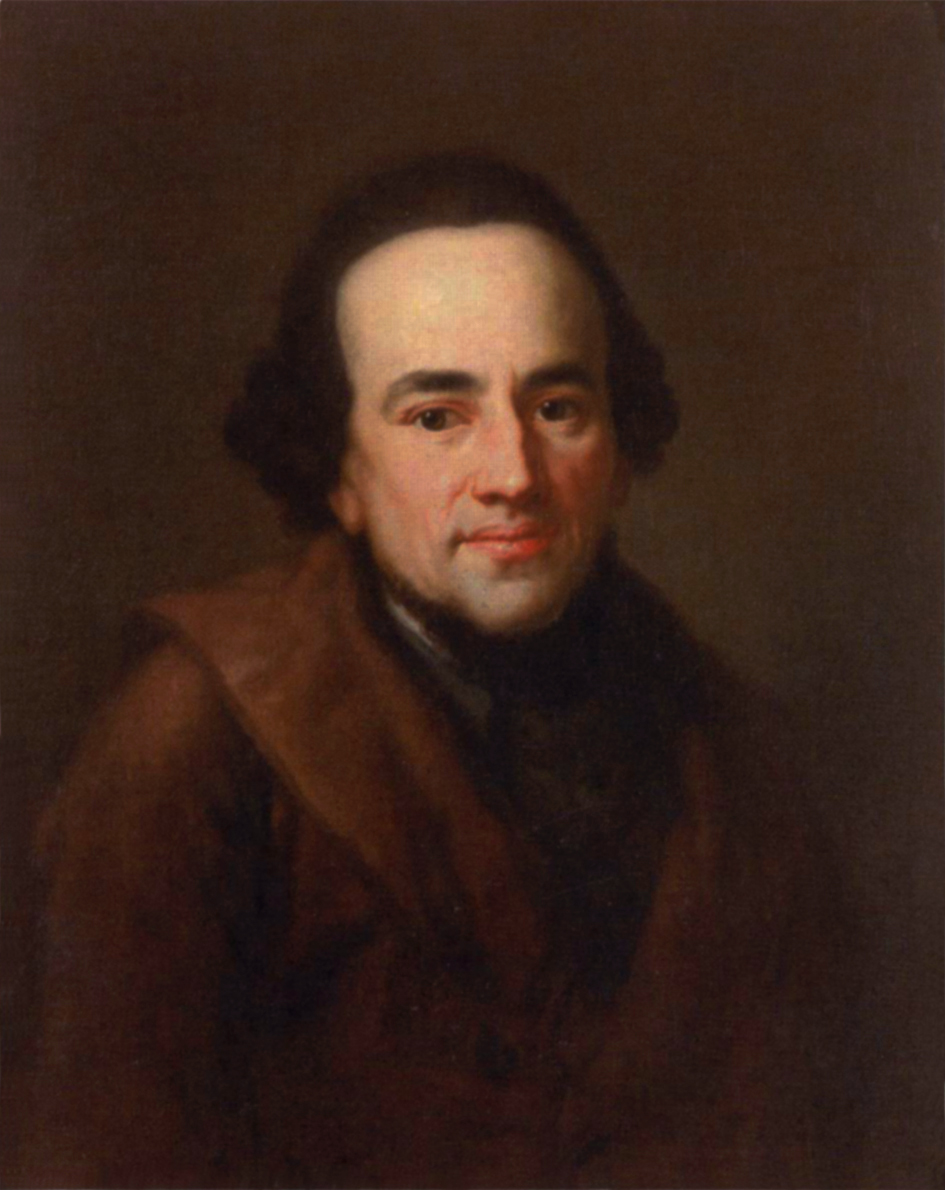
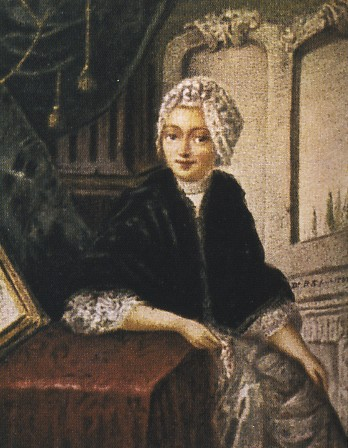
Moses and Fromet Mendelssohn (née Guggenheim)

The Mendelssohn family are the descendants of Mendel of Dessau. The German Jewish philosopher Moses Mendelssohn and his brother Saul were the first to adopt the surname Mendelssohn. The family includes his grandchildren, the composers Fanny and Felix.

== Moses Mendelssohn ==
Moses Mendelssohn was a significant figure in the Age of Enlightenment in Germany. Mendelssohn had ten children, of whom six lived to adulthood. Of those six children, only Recha and Joseph retained the Jewish religion. Abraham Mendelssohn, because of his conversion to Reformed Christianity, adopted the surname Bartholdy at the suggestion of his wife's brother, Jakob Salomon Bartholdy, who had adopted the name from a property owned by the Salomon family.

Mendelssohn's wife, Fromet (Frumet) Guggenheim, was a great-granddaughter of Samuel Oppenheimer.

== Mendelssohn & Co. Bank ==
In 1795 Moses Mendelssohn's eldest son Joseph established the bank Mendelssohn & Co. in Berlin, and his brother Abraham joined the company in 1804. Many members of the family worked for the bank until it was forced to shut down in 1938. In 2004 relatives of the banker Paul von Mendelssohn-Bartholdy (1875–1935), led by his great-nephew Julius H. Schoeps (born 1942), tried to reclaim paintings once owned by him and later sold in the 1940s by his widow, in breach of his will.

== Mendelssohn family ==
Descendants of Moses Mendelssohn

- Moses Mendelssohn (1729–1786), philosopher, married Fromet Guggenheim (1737–1812); 6 children
  - Brendel Mendelssohn (1763–1839), married (i) Simon Veit, (ii) Friedrich von Schlegel
    - Jonas Veit (1790–1854)
    - Philipp Veit (1793–1877)
  - Recha Mendelssohn (1767–1831)
  - Joseph Mendelssohn (1770–1848), banker
    - Benjamin (Georg) Mendelssohn (1794–1874), geographer
    - Alexander Mendelssohn (1798–1871), banker, married Marianne Seeligmann (1799–1880)
      - Marie Mendelssohn (1822–1891), married Robert Warschauer (1816–1884), banker
        - Anna Warschauer (1841–1866), married Ludwig Passini (1832–1903), painter
        - Marie Warschauer (1855–1906), married Ernst von Mendelssohn-Bartholdy (1846–1909) see below (A)
      - Margarete Mendelssohn (1823–1890), married Otto Georg Oppenheim (1817–1909), jurist
        - Hugo Oppenheim (1847–1921), banker, married Anna Oppenheim (1849–1931)
          - Else Oppenheim (1873–1945), married Josef Block (1863–1943), painter
            - Anna Luise Block (1896–1982), publicist; married: (ii) Heinrich Hauser (1901–1955), writer; (iii) Alfred Winslow Jones (1900–1989), hedge fund pioneer
          - Robert Hugo Oppenheim (1882–1956), banker married (i) Charlotte Simon; (ii) Ehrentraut Margaret Von Ilberg; 4 children Hugo Oppenheim, Alexander Oppenheim, Imogene Oppenheim, Roberta Marielouise Oppenheim
        - Franz Oppenheim (1852–1929), chemist
        - Clara Oppenheim (1861–1944), married Adolf Gusserow (1836–1906), gynecologist
      - Franz von Mendelssohn (1829–1889), banker
        - Robert von Mendelssohn (1857–1917), banker, married Giulietta Gordigiani, pianist
          - Eleonora von Mendelssohn (1900–1951), actress, married Martin Kosleck, actor
          - Francesco von Mendelssohn (1901–1972), cellist, theatre director
        - Franz von Mendelssohn (1865–1935), banker, married Maria Westphal (1867–1957), see below (B)
          - Lilli von Mendelssohn (1897–1928), violinist, married Emil Bohnke, violist and composer
            - Robert-Alexander Bohnke (1927–2005), pianist
          - Robert von Mendelssohn (1902–1996), banker
      - Clara Mendelssohn (1840–1927), married Karl Friedrich Otto Westphal (1833–1890), psychiatrist
        - Alexander Carl Otto Westphal (1863–1941), neurologist
        - Anna Westphal (1864–1943), married Eduard Sonnenburg (1848–1915), doctor
        - Marie Westphal (1867–1957), married Franz von Mendelssohn (1865–1935), see above (B)
  - Henriette (Maria) Mendelssohn (1775–1831)
  - Abraham Mendelssohn Bartholdy (1776–1835), banker, married Lea Salomon, granddaughter of Daniel Itzig; 4 children
    - Fanny Hensel née Mendelssohn (1805–1847) composer, married Wilhelm Hensel (1794–1861)
      - Sebastian Ludwig Felix Hensel (1830–1898) married Julie von Adelson
        - Fanny Römer, née Hensel (1857–1891)
        - Cécile Hensel (1858–1928) married Friedrich Leo (1851–1914)
          - Erika Leo (1887–1949) married Walther Brecht
          - Ulrich Leo (1890–1964), Literary scientist
          - Paul Leo (1893–1958), Lutheran pastor and theologian, married 1.: Anna Siegert († 1931), 2.: Eva Dittrich (1901–1998)
            - Anna Leo (born 1931), Children's author
            - Christopher Leo (born 1941), political scientist
            - Monica Leo (born 1944), puppeteer
        - Paul Hensel (1860–1930), philosopher
        - Kurt Hensel (1861–1941), mathematician
          - Albert Hensel (1895–1933), law professor
          - Ruth Hensel (1888–1979)
          - Charlotte Hensel (1896–1990), married Werner Bergengruen (1892–1964), novelist
    - Felix Mendelssohn (Jakob Ludwig Felix Mendelssohn Bartholdy) (1809–1847), composer married Cécile Charlotte Sophie Jeanrenaud (1817–1853)
      - Karl Mendelssohn Bartholdy (1838–1897), historian
        - Cécile von Mendelssohn Bartholdy (1870–1943), married Otto von Mendelssohn Bartholdy (1868–1949), see below (C)
        - Albrecht Mendelssohn Bartholdy (1874–1936), law professor, married Dorothea Wach (1875–1949), see below (D) (Note: Albrecht and Dorothea had no children but adopted 2 daughters, Lea born 1916 and Brigitte (1920–2005))
      - Marie Mendelssohn Bartholdy (1839–1897)
      - Paul Mendelssohn Bartholdy (1841–1880), chemist
        - Otto von Mendelssohn Bartholdy (1868–1949), banker, married Cécile Mendelssohn Bartholdy (1870–1943), see above (C) (Note: Otto and Cécile had two children, Hugo Mendelssohn Bartholdy (1894–1975) and Cécile Mendelssohn Bartholdy born 1898)
        - Paul Mendelssohn Bartholdy (1879–1956), chemist
      - Felix Mendelssohn Bartholdy (1843–1850)
      - Elisabeth Mendelssohn Bartholdy (1845–1910) married Adolf Wach
        - Felix Wach (1871–1943)
          - Joachim Wach (1898–1955)
        - Dorothea Wach (1875–1949) married Albrecht Mendelssohn Bartholdy (1874–1936), see above (D)
    - Rebecka Mendelssohn (1811–1858) married Peter Gustav Lejeune Dirichlet (1805–1859), mathematician
      - Walter Lejeune Dirichlet (1833–1887) married Anna Sachs (1835–1889)
        - Elisabeth Lejeune-Dirichlet (1860–1920) married Heinrich Nelson (1854–1929), lawyer
          - Leonard Nelson (1882–1927), philosopher
    - Paul Mendelssohn-Bartholdy (1812–1874), banker, married Pauline Louise Albertine Heine (1814–1879)
      - Ernst von Mendelssohn-Bartholdy (1846–1909), banker, married Marie Warschauer (1855–1906), see above (A)
        - Katharine von Mendelssohn-Bartholdy (1870–1943)
        - Charlotte von Mendelssohn-Bartholdy (1871–1961)
        - Paul von Mendelssohn-Bartholdy (1875–1935), banker, married Charlotte "Lotte" Reichenheim
        - Enole Marie von Mendelssohn-Bartholdy (1879–1947), married Albert Constantin, Graf von Schwerin (1870–1956), diplomat, had issue
        - Marie Busch (1881–1970), married Felix Busch (1871–1938), state official
          - Dorothea Busch (1915–1996), married Hans-Joachim Schoeps (1909–1980), theologian
            - Julius H. Schoeps (born 1942), historian
        - Alexander von Mendelssohn-Bartholdy (1889–1917)
  - Nathan Mendelssohn (1781–1852) instrument maker, married Henrietta Itzig, cousin of Lea Soloman and granddaughter of Daniel Itzig
    - Arnold Mendelssohn (1817–1854), a political follower of Ferdinand Lassalle
    - Ottilie Mendelssohn (1819–1848) married Ernst Kummer (1810–1893), mathematician
      - Marie Elisabeth Kummer (1842–1921) married Hermann Schwarz (1843–1921), mathematician
    - Wilhelm Mendelssohn (1821–1866) married Louise Aimee Cauer (sister to Bertha Cauer)
      - Arnold Mendelssohn (1855–1933) composer, married Maria Cauer

Descendants of Saul Mendelssohn include:

- Philibert Mendelssohn, as a mathematician appointed as 'Koenigliche Rechnungsrat' in the Prussian State Survey

- Kurt Mendelssohn, mathematician, one of Philibert's grandchildren
- Heinrich Mendelssohn, biologist, also one of Philibert's grandchildren

== Gallery ==
Children of Moses and Fromet Mendelssohn:

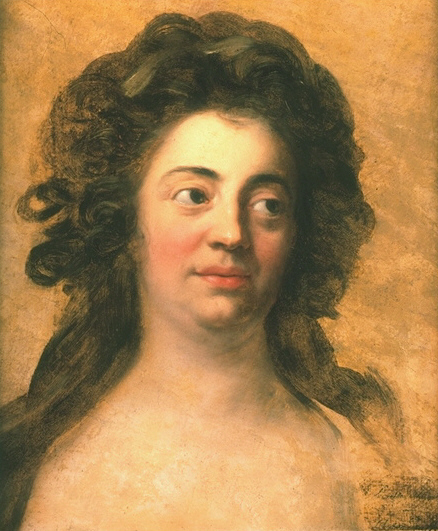
Dorothea von Schlegel née Mendelssohn c. 1790, by Anton Graff

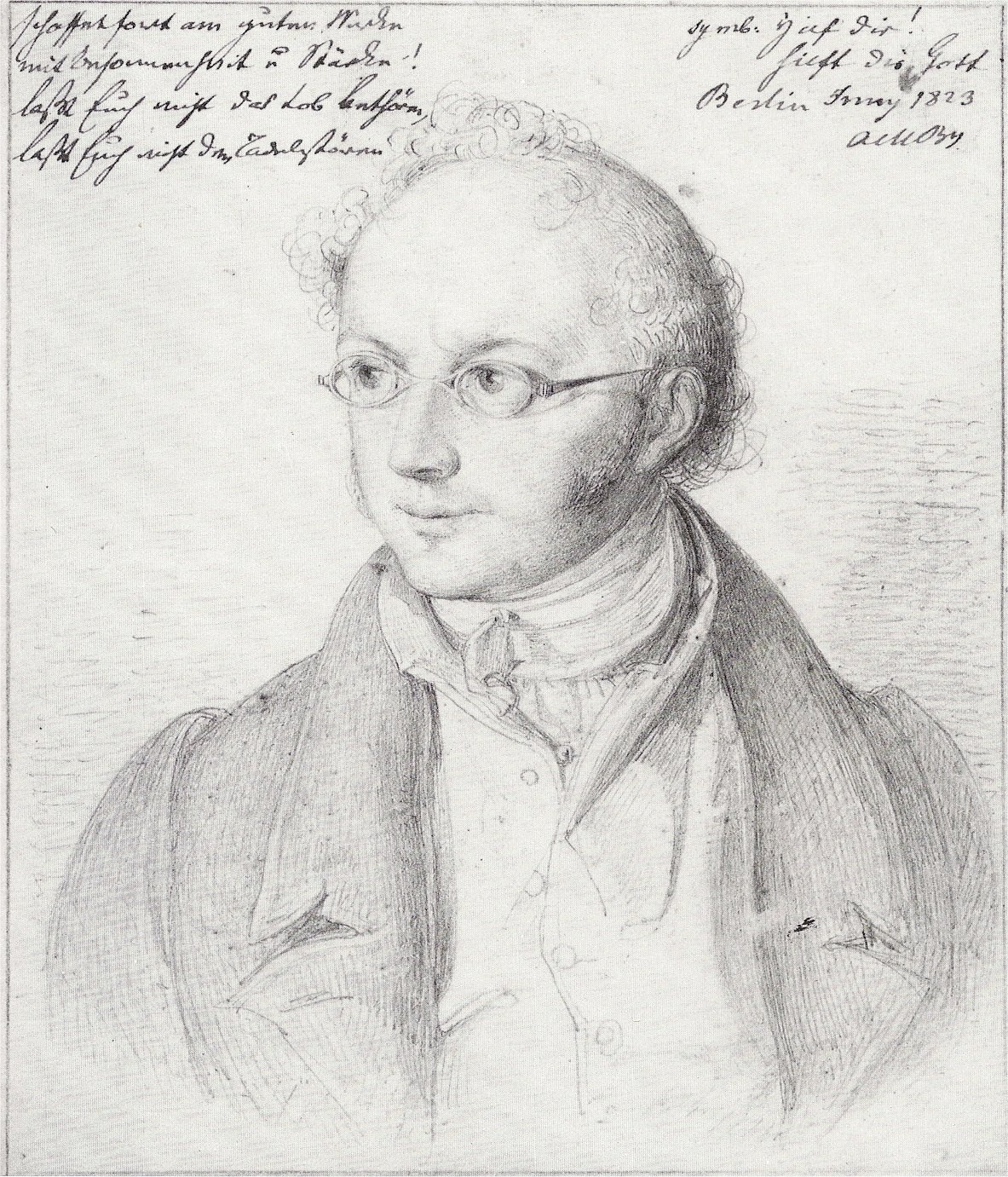
Abraham Mendelssohn Bartholdy, 1823, by his son-in-law, Wilhelm Hensel

Children of Abraham Mendelssohn Bartholdy:

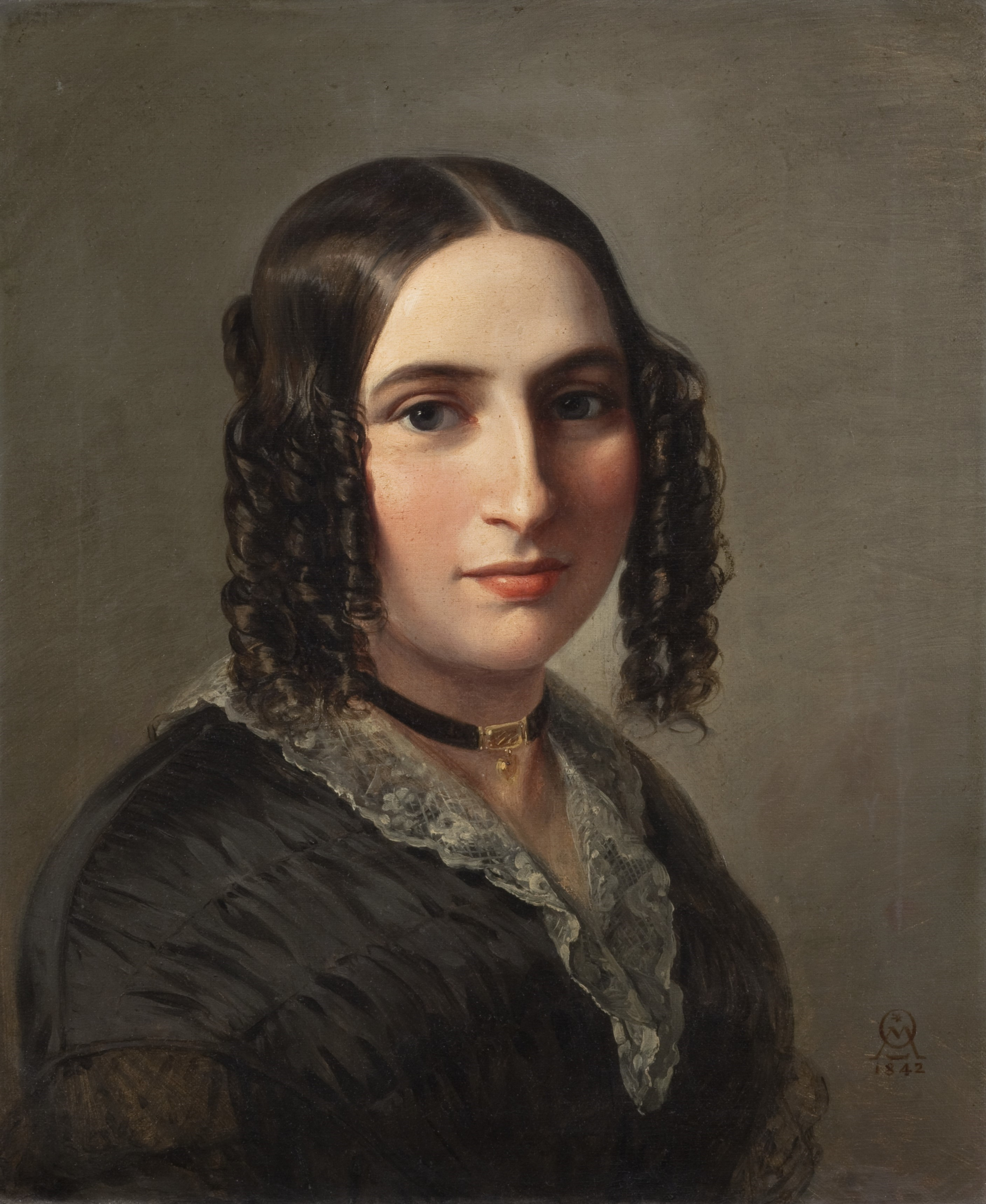
Fanny Hensel née Mendelssohn, 1842, by Moritz Daniel Oppenheim

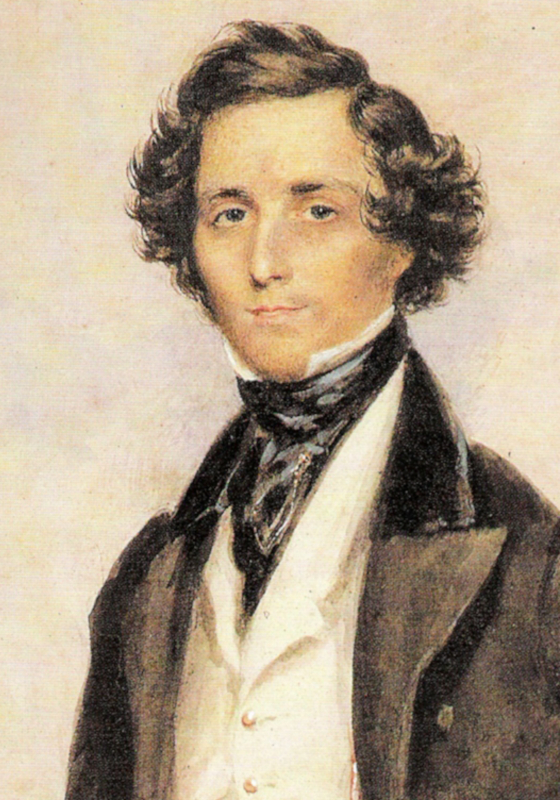
Felix Mendelssohn, 1829, by James Warren Childe

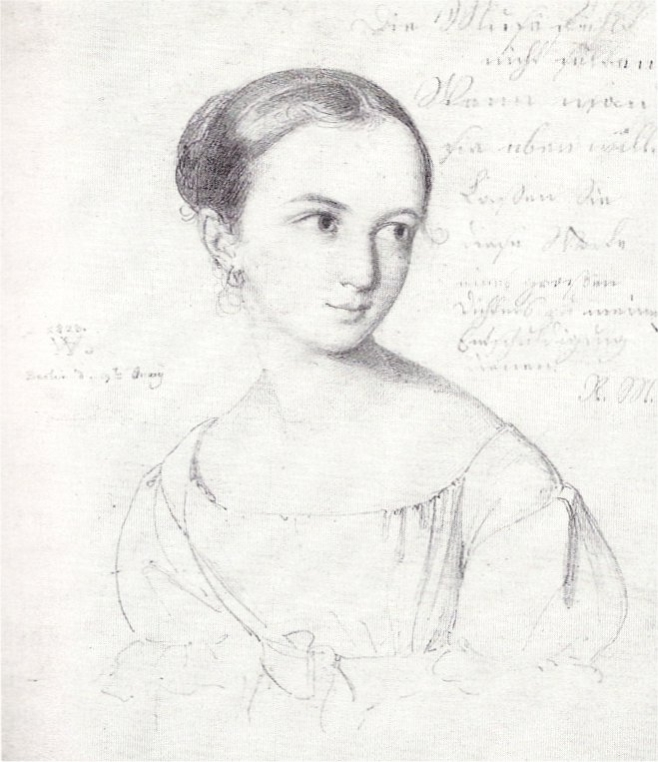
Rebecka Mendelssohn, 1823, by Wilhelm Hensel
