= Gerard von Brucken Fock =

Dutch pianist

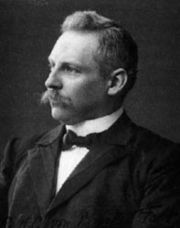
- Gerard von Brucken Fock as photographed by Koenc & Büttinghausen in Amsterdam on 16 May 1906.
- Born: Gerardus Hubertus Galenus Fock; 28 December 1859; Koudekerke
- Died: 15 August 1935 (aged 75); Aerdenhout
- Occupations: Composer, Painter
- Notable work: List of compositions
- Style: Late Romantic

Gerardus Hubertus Galenus von Brucken Fock (28 December 1859 – 15 August 1935) was a nineteenth-century classical Dutch pianist who gave up his career as a performer to compose and paint.

Constantly torn between art and church, he traveled much in Europe, later establishing himself in Amsterdam. He married the daughter of a member of the Zeeland parliament. He joined the Salvation Army and traveled from place to place in France, preaching and playing organ. He was also considered a very good draftsman and watercolorist whose works often inspired his own musical pieces. His orchestral works frequently lean towards French Impressionists like Claude Debussy and Maurice Ravel.

== Life ==
=== Family and education ===
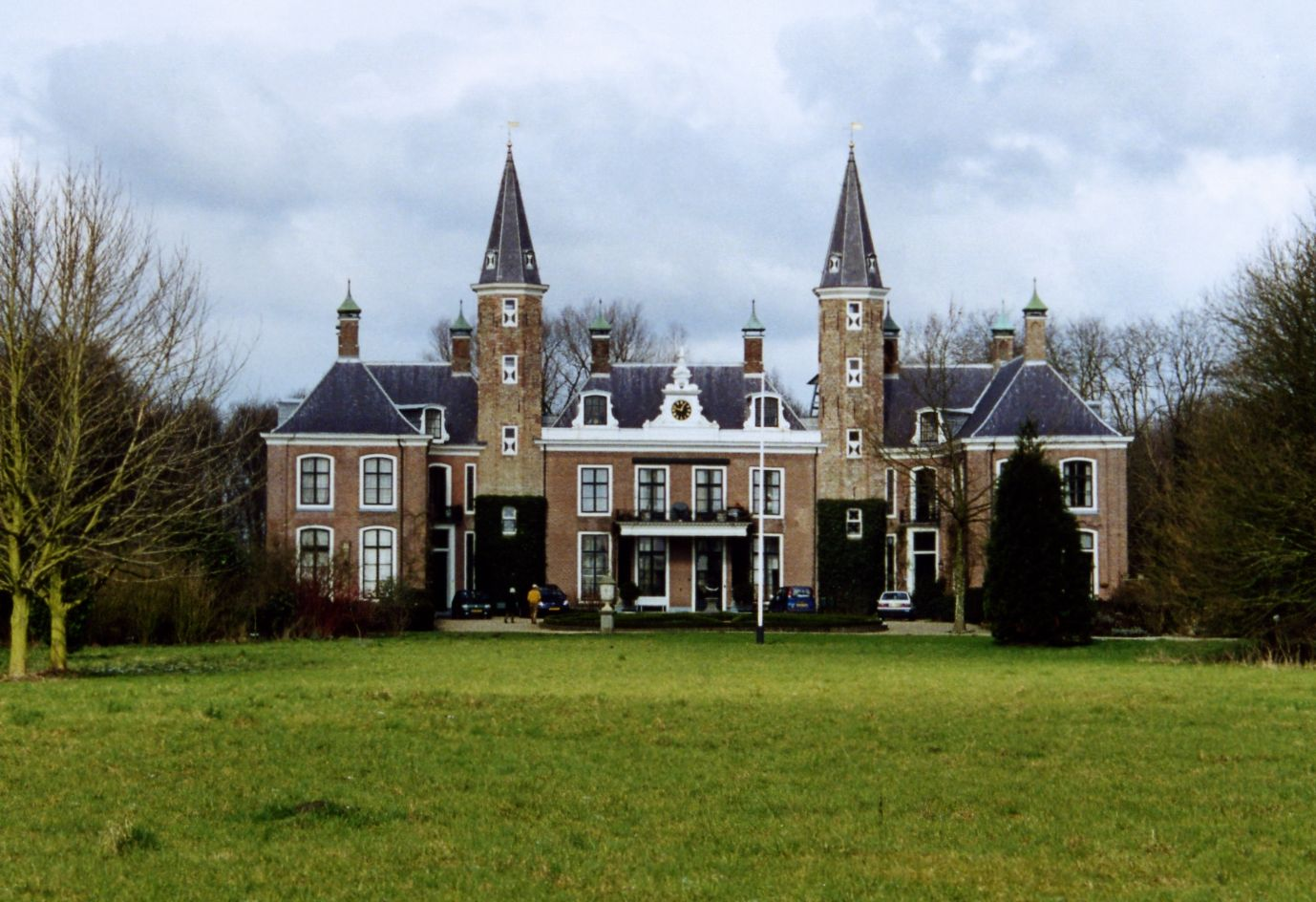
Ter Hooge Castle in 1964

Gerard von Brucken Fock (also known as Geert) was born as Gerardus Hubertus Galenus Fock on Ter Hooge Castle, Koudekerke, in the outskirts of Middelburg where he spent the summers of his early childhood. His father was Henri Dignes von Brucken Fock and his mother Johanna Kuykendall. He had three brothers, one of them being Abraham Emilius von Brucken Fock, a soldier who later acquired fame as a composer as well. Less than four years later his father changed his name to "von Brucken Fock". He grew up in the province of Zeeland as the child of a wealthy family, and although he never had to work he did attend his secondary school in Middelburg. In 1877 he attempted to join the Royal Military Academy in Breda, but failed the entrance exam.

He took piano lessons with professor Theodorus Leonardus van der Wurff (1836–1900) and studied music composition with the famous composer Richard Hol, who taught him the principles of harmony between 1877 and 1879 in Utrecht, played viola in ensembles and maintained contacts with prominent musicians from the Utrechtsch Orchestra with whom he toured in Middelburg. He then decided to continue with his studies in music and moved to Berlin in September 1879 to take lessons with the renowned pedagogue and composer Friedrich Kiel and composition with professors Woldemar Bargiel and Ernst Rudorff. After moving from one place to another from 1883, visiting Dresden, Prague, Vienna and the German island of Borkum, he returned to Middelburg in 1885 and married Maria Johanna Pompe van Meerdervoort, daughter of a member of the Zeeland parliament. After a stay in Paris and in Eversdijk, in south Beveland where his parents were then living, he finally settled with her in Amsterdam in 1888 where they lived until 1891, and again from 1896 to 1904. His summers he used to spend in Domburg, where he had contacts with Jean Theodoor Toorop and other painters of his time.

=== Career ===
In Amsterdam he was a longtime director of the Remonstrant choir, and also composed much, constantly torn between art and church, between the ideas of Henrik Ibsen and Leo Tolstoy. Inspired by his own stories, he summed up the idea of earning money as a piano teacher in Leipzig. He then commissioned his banker to represent him all over money matters and take care of his finances selling everything he had, after which the couple traveled to Germany. But this adventure from 1891 soon would turn out to be a complete failure. He tried for a couple of days to work as a farm laborer on the farm of his wife's uncle near Kruiningen, but on his first attempt to use the scythe he cut himself in the fingers. He then traveled back to Paris, to where his wife, after much struggle, followed. He then became a volunteer for the Salvation Army and from 1892 to 1895. They walked the streets throughout France and Switzerland evangelizing the people with a portable organ. During this period he wrote and harmonized just songs for the Salvation Army.

In 1895 Von Brucken Fock took his temporary dismissal from the Salvation Army, picked up the thread of composing again in 1898 and composed Impromptu: Le Gironde for piano, later released as Opus 12. This is only one of his many works inspired by nature. His paintings, drawings and watercolors contain the same themes of landscapes, dunes and sea, as evidenced by titles such as Domburg Bathing beach (1886) and A quiet Western Schelde (1890). Gehard Von Brucken Fock left France and settled with his wife again in Amsterdam, where they continued to live until 1904, apart from a few brief interruptions. But in him there was a desire for evangelism. Several times he left the Salvation Army for the Free Evangelical Church. In 1898 he decided to establish a 'Hallelujah' movement in the spirit of the Salvation Army, but without the military dictatorship. He composed many musical pieces, including his Christmas Cantata (1900) and the Easter Cantata (1901). During a short stay in Walcheren, he was inspired to write his 24 Preludes for Piano (1900–1901), following the example of Frédéric Chopin.

From 1904 to 1912 Gerard and his wife lived in Aerdenhout, but briefly stayed in Berlin between 1905 and 1906. After having lived in Paris between 1912 and 1913, they moved to Laren and then to Katwijk aan Zee. In Laren, he wrote a book about the impending kingdom of God on Earth, that he sent to an interested publisher, but he asked the manuscript back. Middelburg music publisher Anthony Noske approached him shortly in April 1918 in order to push his work ahead, but Gerard politely refused any help saying that he was going through one of his many anti-art periods again. A month later he wrote, however, that an illness of his wife had opened his eyes and that he had decided to return to his former views and lifestyle. Eventually he settled down in Heemstede in 1920 where he stayed until his death. In this last period of his life von Brucken Fock gave some church concerts, but wrote music mainly for himself, fleeing from the company of others. He also worked again in his oratorio The Second Coming of Christ that he had composed around 1905. Shortly before his death, at the age of 75, he completed his requiem, a masterpiece, which he began writing in 1888 and finished in 1933, with a successful premiere one year later. He died at Aerdenhout in 1935, specifying in his will that a fund should be created under his name to promote concerts and art exhibitions each year in the Netherlands.

== Musical works ==
Gerard von Brucken Fock established his reputation as a composer of piano sonatas, preludes and moments musicaux, which were performed many times during his lifetime. Many of his compositions were published in the Netherlands and abroad, mostly with positive reviews. He was very active as a composer and also as a visual artist. He created a large number of works which shows the influence of, among others, Johannes Brahms, Frédéric Chopin, Franz Liszt and also from his friend Edvard Grieg who called him the "Dutch Chopin." The most important part of Gerard Focks repertoire as an artist came about between 1910 and 1920 for he allowed himself to be partially inspired in his compositions by the same topics of his drawings and paintings, the landscapes and the sea, and consequently with the Hague School of painting, although it has different style influences, but can be called Impressiniosm, like some of his music. His musical work is in line with those by the Amsterdam composers Daniel de Lange and Alphons Diepenbrock. He also wrote much religious music, including an oratorio, The Second Coming of Christ (1910), and a requiem (1933).

== Selected works ==
=== Symphonies ===
- Symphony No. 1 in C major, Op. 12

1. Sostenuto
2. Andante molto cantabile
3. Scherzo: allegro molto
4. Finale. Adagio

- Symphony No. 2 in B♭ major (1907–1908)

1. Allegro maestoso
2. Andante quasi adagio
3. Allegro assai
4. Grave - allegro

- Symphony No. 3 in C♯ minor (1918)

1. Adagio
2. Allegro grazioso vivace
3. Andante molto espressivo
4. Allegro scherzando

=== Other orchestral works ===
- Die Wassergeusen, Ouverture, Op. 10 (1888)
- Gnomendansje, Concert Piece in B minor, Op. 13 (1891)
- Impressions du Midi, Suite No. 1
- Impressions du Midi, Suite No. 2
- Impressions du Midi, Suite No. 3
- Impressions du Midi, Suite No. 4
- Suite No. 5 "Bretonse Suite" (1900)

1. De Zee in de verte (The Sea in the Distance)
2. Caprice
3. Morgenstond aan zee (Morning on the Sea)
4. Hymne
5. Bretonsche Schipperslied (Breton Boat Song)
6. De Storm (The Storm)

- Suite No. 6
- Suite No. 7
- Van de Zee, en de Verte ("The sea and the distance") (1902–1903)
- Maannacht op Zee (Nuit lunaire sur la mer)
- 2 Liederen van de Zee (2 Songs of the Sea) (1906)

1. In den nacht
2. Hymne

- 3 Gnomendansjes, Op. 29
- Aus dem Süden, Suite, Op. 32

1. Fels und Meer
2. Tanz
3. Einsamkeit
4. Waldgeister
5. Schalkhaftes Mädchen

=== Concertante ===
- Concerto in D minor for piano and orchestra (1888)

=== Chamber music ===
- Sonata in A major for violin and piano (1878)
- Sonata in B♭ minor for viola and piano, Op. 5 (1885)
- Sonata in E major for violin and piano (1889)
- Stücke und Tänze for violin and piano (1889)
- Elegie for violin and piano, Op. 7 (1890)
- Sonata in F major for violin and piano, Op. 23 (1907)
- Sonata for cello and piano (1931)

=== Piano ===
- Sonata (1878)
- Sonata in E♭ major (1882)
- 4 Jeugd-Impressies
- 6 Klavierstukken (6 Piano Pieces), Op. 1 (1882)
- 9 kleine Praeludien (9 Little Preludes), Op. 2 (published c. 1886)
- Lente-nadering (Frühlingsahnung) (1889)
- 6 Spaansche Dansen (6 Spanish Dances), Op. 3 (1885)
- 5 Praeludien (5 Preludes), Op. 4
- Sonata in B♭ minor, Op. 5 (1886)
- 2 Slavische Dansen (2 Slavic Dances), Op. 6 (published 1890)
- 10 Praeludien (10 Preludes), Op. 8
- 3 Praeludien (3 Preludes), Op. 9
- Serenata (Serenade), Op. 10 (1891); orchestrated in 1934
- 5 Moments musicaux, Op. 11 (1891)
- Impromptu et 4 préludes, Op. 12 (1898)

1. Impromptu (La Gironde)
2. Prélude (Laag water aan de Schelde)
3. Prélude (Andante non troppo)
4. Prélude (Andante non troppo)
5. Prélude (Allegro non troppo)

- 3 Spaansche Dansen (Spanish Dances), Op. 13
- 24 Praeludien (24 Preludes), Op. 15
- 7 Praeludien (7 Preludes), Op. 16
- 2 Préludes en étude, Op. 20 (1907)

1. Prélude in A major
2. Prélude in E major
3. Étude in A major

- Ballade, Op. 21 (1907)
- 3 Klavierstukken (3 Piano Pieces), Op. 24
- Scherzo macabre, Op. 25 (1911)
- 6 Klavierstukken (6 Piano Pieces), Op. 26 (1911)
- 12 Klavierstukken (12 Piano Pieces), Op. 27 (1878–1881)
- 6 Klavierstücke (6 Piano Pieces), Op. 29 (1900)
- 18 Klavierstücke (1918)
- 4 Pianostukken (1924–1927)

=== Vocal ===
- 3 Lieder for high voice and piano, Op. 14 (published 1891)

1. Seligkeit
2. Bitte
3. Abendruh'

- 14 Lieder for soprano and piano, Op. 18

1. Die Möve; words by Anna Ritter
2. Versäumte Zeit; words by Anna Ritter
3. Die Insel der Vergessenheit; words by Anna Ritter
4. Das verirrte Wölkchen; words by Anna Ritter
5. Mädchenlied; words by Ernst Zitelmann
6. Mädchenlied; words by Ernst Zitelmann
7. Mädchenlied; words by Ernst Zitelmann
8. Anklage
9. Ritzelputzel
10. Abend im Herbst
11. Volkslied
12. Erinnerung; words by Annemarie von Nathusius
13. Es ist so still; words by Paul Mochmann
14. Wiegenlied; words by Hoffmann von Fallersleben

- 5 Liederen (5 Songs) for soprano and piano, Op. 22; words by Joannes Reddingius

1. Hei met de wolken zoo wit
2. Schemerliedje
3. Witte wijven dansen om en om
4. Processie
5. In mijn stille kamer

- 7 Liederen (7 Songs) for soprano (or mezzo-soprano) or tenor and piano, Op. 28 (1917)

1. Les cigales; words by Emmanuel Delbousquet
2. Heimweh; words by Karl Johann Philipp Spitta
3. En lisant l'Evangile; words by Paul Bourget
4. L'idéal; words by Sully Prudhomme
5. Avond na regen; words by Carel Steven Adama van Scheltema
6. Bruit de char; words by Achille Millien
7. De nacht; words by Carel Steven Adama van Scheltema

- 4 Liederen (4 Songs) for voice and piano, Op. 30 (1924); words by Louise Pompe

1. Wensch
2. Gebed
3. Stil-zijn
4. Zonnedag

- Berceuse d'armorique for voice and piano (or orchestra); words by Anatole Le Braz

=== Choral ===
- 3 Geestelijke liederen (3 Sacred Songs) for mixed chorus a cappella, Op. 14

1. Het naderend Godsrijk
2. Geluk
3. Gethsemané

- 22 Geestelijke liederen (22 Sacred Songs) for soloist, mixed chorus and piano or harmonium, Op. 17

1. Kanaän
2. Lentelied
3. 'k Dank U, o Heer!

- Kerstcantate (Christmas Cantata) (1900)
- Paaschcantate (Easter Cantata) for soloists, chorus, string quartet and organ (1901)
- Pinkstercantate (Pentecostal Cantata) for soloist, chorus and orchestra (1901–1903)
- De Wederkomst van Christus, of Het naderende Godsrijk (The Second Coming of Christ, or The Approaching Kingdom of God), Oratorio for soprano, alto, tenor, bass, double mixed chorus and orchestra (organ ad libitum), Op. 19 (1906, revised 1910); words by the composer
- 7 Koralen for mixed chorus (or solo voices) and organ or piano; words by the composer, Op. 31 (1925)

1. Gods lankmoedigheid
2. De eeuwige rotssteen
3. Het komende vredesrijk
4. O God, ik heb U lief
5. Danklied
6. Gebed in verzoeking
7. Gebed in zieleangst

- Requiem in E♭ minor for 2 sopranos, alto, tenor, bass, double mixed chorus and orchestra (1933)
- 2 Pinksterliederen van I. da Costa (2 Pentecostal Songs of I. da Costa) for mixed chorus (or voice and harmonium); words by Isaac da Costa

1. Ja, de trooster is gekomen
2. Daal! Schepper, Heil'ge Geest

Note: In 1919 Julius Röntgen wrote three orchestral works for von Brucken Fock entitled: Drei Praeludien und Fugen, "An G.H.G. von Brucken Fock". They were all based on Fock's initials, GHGBF.

== Sources ==
- A. A. Clement: "Fock, Hubertus Gerardus Galenus (1859-1935)" in Biografisch Woordenboek van Nederland, Vol. 6.
