= Armand Praviel =

French journalist, writer and lawyer (1875–1944)

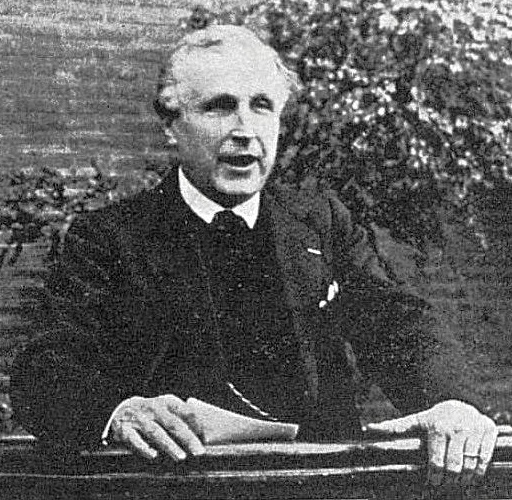
- Praviel in 1936
- Born: 13 October 1875; L'Isle-Jourdain, France
- Died: 15 January 1944 (aged 68); Perpignan, France
- Occupations: writer; lawyer

Armand Praviel (13 October 1875 – 15 January 1944) was a French journalist, writer and lawyer. Although he had a doctorate in law, he was primarily known for his multi-faceted and prolific literary output which included poetry, plays, novels, essays, biographies, and literary and theatrical criticism. He was born in L'Isle-Jourdain, but apart from his military service during World War I, spent his entire career in Toulouse where he was a member of the Académie des Jeux floraux and the editor-in-chief of L'Express du Midi for many years. In 1925 the Académie française awarded him the Prix Montyon for his novel L'histoire tragique de la Belle Violante. Praviel died in Perpignan at the age of 68.

== Early life ==
Praviel was born in L'Isle-Jourdain in southwestern France, the son of Félix and Noémie (née Tintelin) Praviel. His father was a successful businessman and notary who came from a long line of notaries and lawyers. He was educated as a boarder at the Jesuit lycée Le Caousou in Toulouse and then, at his father's wish, studied law at the University of Toulouse. He received his doctorate in law in 1901 with a thesis entitled Le Patronage des libérés. Praviel himself was a member of the Societé de Patronage des Libérés in Toulouse which advocated for the support and rehabilitation of ex-convicts and child criminals. However, from his early youth Praviel's primary interests were literary ones, and his decision to forsake the law for a career as a writer, although encouraged by his mother, ultimately led to an estrangement from his father.

Praviel's interest in literature and drama manifested itself was he was still at school. He was at the center of Le Caousou's theatrical life, putting on plays during the school holidays and serving as the stage director and set designer as well as one of the actors. In 1895 he started a small theatre troupe called Societé de Saint-Genest which gave performances in the salons of Toulouse, and throughout his life he was considered a gifted amateur actor. As a young man he had also performed in plays by Corneille and Racine at the Jardin Royal in Toulouse. It was during that time that he fell in love with the actress Alice Gardenal. However, his hopes came to nothing when his mother opposed the marriage.

== Literary career and later years ==
In 1897 Praviel founded L'Âme latine, a bi-monthly journal devoted to literature and poetry whose circle included the young poets and intellectuals Emmanuel Delbousquet, Pierre Fons, Joseph de Bonne, (Note: Joseph de Bonne (20 March 1883 – 25 September 1915) was a poet and essayist. He was born in Toulouse, and like Praviel had a doctorate in law from the University of Toulouse. He was killed in World War I and posthumously awarded the Prix Montyon by the Académie française in 1916.) and Marc Lafargue. (Note: Marc Lafargue (15 May 1876 – 7 May 1927) was poet, painter, and art critic. He was a native of Toulouse and died there, aged 50.) Praviel's friend Joseph de Pesquidoux once described him as the "D'Artagnan of the pen", and he dressed the part in his dark velvet jackets, wide-brimmed felt hats and a black cape lined with red velvet that was his constant companion. The Belgian journal La Lutte published a collection of his poetry, Poèmes mystiques, in 1900, and the following year L'Âme latine published another collection entitled La Ronde de cygnes. Both collections reflected his mystic Catholicism. Further collections of his religious poetry were published in 1904 (La Tragédie du Soir), 1909 (L'Exercice du chemin de la Croix), and 1913 (Le Cantique des saisons). He often presented his poems in contests at the Académie des Jeux floraux (Academy of the Floral Games). He was given the title of Master of the Floral Games in 1905. Five years later he was elected a Maintainer of the academy and occupied its Fifth Chair. (Note: The Académie des Jeux floraux has 40 elected members, called "Maintainers" (Mainteneurs), at any one time. Each Maintainer occupies a numbered "Chair" (Fauteuil).)

By 1907 Praviel was the editor-in-chief of L'Express du Midi in Toulouse and continued to write for that paper and its successor La Garonne for the next thirty years. His pieces also appeared in the Mercure de France, La Revue hebdomadaire, Le Correspondant, and Le Gay Saber. He was mobilised into the French army at the outbreak of World War I in 1914 and served with the 88th Infantry of Auch until he was captured by the Germans in 1918. Both his parents died while he was away in the war. In 1907 he had married Marguerite Duval, the daughter of a prominent lawyer in Reims. The marriage produced two children, Gerard and Marie-Ange, but proved to be an unhappy one. Marguerite, plagued by ill-health, died in 1929. Praviel married again in 1934 to his first love, Alice Gardenal.

During the course of his career Praviel received two prizes from the Académie française: the Prix Jules Davaine in 1916 and the Prix Montyon in 1925. The latter was for his novel L'histoire tragique de la Belle Violante which was inspired by the dealing with the Fualdès affair, the mysterious murder of Antoine Bernardin Fualdès which had gripped France in 1817.

Praviel died in Perpignan at the age of 68. As stipulated in his will, he was buried in the red velvet-lined cape of his youth. In 1950 the Collège d'Occitanie published Hommage à Armand Praviel, a 120-page book with chapters on each aspect of his life and work written by his friends from the Académie française, Académie des Jeux floraux, and L'Âme latine. The Boulevard Armand Praviel in L'Isle-Jourdain is named in his honour as is the Rue Armand Praviel in Toulouse.
