= Wim Franken =

Dutch composer and pianist (1922–2012)

Wim Franken (7 January 1922, Assen – 21 April 2012, Deventer) was a Dutch composer, pianist, and carillonneur.

== Life and work ==
Franken studied piano with J. Wilderbeek and T. Hart Nibbrig-de Graaf, theory with Hugo Godron and Karel Mengelberg, carillon with Leen 't Hart and Peter Bakker. He taught piano at the music schools in Hilversum and Amersfoort and was carillonneur in the city of Weesp and at the Zuiderkerk in Amsterdam.

Franken composed operas, ballets, orchestral works, chamber music, piano and organ works, choral music, song cycles, film scores and electronic music. He is a noted composer of music for carillon, making exceptional contributions to the repertoire, including the Torenmuziek series for carillon and brass instruments.

== Selected works ==
Franken's music is published by Donemus, Amsterdam.
Stage

- De keizer en de nachtegaal, School Opera in 3 acts (`1961–1963); after the story by Hans Christian Andersen
- Roxelane en de beren, Ballet (1964–1965)
- Il sacro furto, Church Opera (2001); libretto by the composer

Orchestral

- Sinfonietta (1956)
- Concerto for String Orchestra (without double bass) (1958)
- Circo for chamber orchestra (1952–1961)
- Rapsodie over vijf Europese volksliederen (1964)
- Muziek uit de film "Portret van Frans Hals" for chamber orchestra (1963)
- Divertimento naar de balletmuziek "Roxelane en de beren" (1965)

Concertante

- Concertino for piano and string orchestra (1952)
- Rapsodia campestra for violin and orchestra (1957, 1967)
- Concert in G for piano and orchestra (1975)
- Concerto for piano, brass and percussion (1976)

Chamber music

- Sonata for oboe solo (1947)
- Divertimento for flute, viola, cello and piano (1948)
- Serenata for chamber ensemble (flute, clarinet, trumpet, 2 violins, cello, piano) (1948, revised 1979)
- Sonata for viola solo (1948)
- Sonata for violin or clarinet and piano (1953, revised 1972)
- Serenade for flute (piccolo), piano and double bass (1957–1958)
- Horlepiep, Folk Dance Arrangement for string quartet (1967)
- Intermède à la Russe for accordion ensemble
- En passant for flute, oboe, clarinet, bassoon and horn (1989)
- Sonata for cello and piano (1993)
- Tijdeloos for 6 recorders and 2 organs (1983/2006)

Carillon

- Variaties en fughetta over een oud Frans kerstlied (1952)
- Prélude, fantasie (over twee oud-Nederlandse volksliederen) en rondeau for carillon or piano (1956, revised 1962)
- Arioso en passacaglia (1959)
- De geuzen (over de oud-Nederlandse liederen: "Helpt nu u zelf, zo helpt u God" en "Slaat op den trommele, van dieredomdeine"), Torenmuziek No. 1 for carillon, brass and percussion (1961); version for carillon in C (1962)
- Zes ritmische studies (6 Rhythmic Studies) for carillon or piano (1963)
- Musica di campanile (omaggio a Jan P. Sweelinck), Torenmuziek No. 2 for carillon, brass and percussion (1965)
- Rapsodie française sur trois chansons populaires (1968)
- Drie impressies naar Frans Hals for 4- or 5-octave carillon (1969)
- Mascarade: quatre scènes de ballet (1974)
- Torenmuziek No. 3 for carillon, brass and percussion (1978)
- Nachtlied: metamorfosen over een avond- en een ochtendlied for 4- or 5-octave carillon (2 players) (1979)
- Sic preludebat (1981, revised 1985)
- In de wind, Torenmuziek No. 4 for 3 carillons (4 players), 3 trumpets and snare drum (1982)
- Le cercle céleste for carillon 4-hands (1986)
- Groninger rapsodie (1988)
- Echo, Torenmuziek No. 5 for carillon 4-hands and brass ensemble (1997)
- Scarlattiana, Torenmuziek No. 6 for carillon and brass ensemble (2003)

Organ

- Sonata for organ (1956, revised 1992)

Piano

- Piano Sonata No. 1 (1946)
- Piano Sonata No. 2 (1950–1951)
- Suite from the Ballet Music "Jan Klaassen op reis" (1951)
- Sonatina (1953)

Vocal

- Zes Rilke-liederen (6 Rilke Songs) for low voice and piano (1946–1959); words by Rainer Maria Rilke
- Volkswijze, 5 Songs for voice and piano (1959); words by J. Slauerhoff
- Yoeng Poe Tsjoeng, 8 Songs on Old Chinese Poems for high voice and piano (1959); Dutch translation by J. Slauerhoff
- Zes Slauerhoff-liederen (6 Slauerhoff Songs) for medium voice and piano (1961–1967) or low voice and piano (1992); words by J. Slauerhoff
- Cinq poèmes de François Villon for tenor and piano (1969); words by François Villon

Choral

- Holland for male chorus and piano or organ (1957); also for male chorus, carillon and brass ensemble; words by Carel Steven Adama van Scheltema
- Cantate campanae op randschriften van oude luid-, slag- en beiaardklokken for mixed chorus and orchestra with obligato piano (1962)
- Curaçau, Folk Song Arrangement for male chorus, wind ensemble (1963)
- As de boer 'n poar klompen aan het, Folk Song Arrangement for chorus and orchestra (1963)
- Ik zeg adieu, Folk Song Arrangement for chorus and orchestra (1963)
- In Holland staat een huis, Folk Song Arrangement for chorus and orchestra (1963)
- Onze patriotjes, Folk Song Arrangement for chorus and orchestra (1963)
- Cinq poèmes de Jacques Prévert for mixed chorus a cappella (1964); words by Jacques Prévert
- Daar het nu feest van Pasen is, Folk Song Arrangement for mixed chorus and chamber orchestra (1966)
- Nieuwjaarslied, Folk Song Arrangement for female chorus and chamber ensemble (1966)
- Te Laren op de dam, Folk Song Arrangement for male chorus and chamber ensemble (1966)
- Boerenjongs en wichter, Folk Song Arrangement for mixed chorus and orchestra (1966)
- 't Haasken, Folk Song Arrangement for mixed chorus and orchestra (1966)
- Weefliedje (Terschelling), Folk Song Arrangement for mixed chorus and orchestra (1966)
- Wie wil er mee naar Wieringen varen, Folk Song Arrangement for mixed chorus and orchestra (1966)
- Wel Anne Marieke, Folk Song Arrangement for mixed chorus and chamber orchestra (1967)
- Heederik-cantate for mixed chorus, orchestra and tape (1968)
- Sneeuw-liedje: volksliedje uit grootmoeders tijd, Folk Song Arrangement for unison chorus (or solo voice) and orchestra (1971)
- Het zingende meisje: volksliedje uit grootmoeders tijd, Folk Song Arrangement for chorus of like voices and orchestra (1971)
- Huzaren-liedje, Folk Song Arrangement for chorus of like voices and orchestra (1971)
- Tancuj, tancuj (Csárdás), Folk Song Arrangement for chorus of like voices and orchestra (1971)
- Eine kleine Mozartreise: op gedichten en brief-fragmenten van Wolfgang Amadeus Mozart for mixed chorus and brass quintet or piano (1980)
- Windstreken: voor de verenigde ensembles van een muziekschool en geluidsband for children's chorus, ensemble and tape (1981)
- De vloed in klank, Oratorio for narrator, soloists, 3 choruses, 6 recorders, 3 organs, 2 orchestras and tape (1983–1984)
- Le déluge: trois fragments tirés du mystère "Le déluge" d'Alfred de Vigny for mixed chorus a cappella (1985)
- In weer en wind for children's chorus and piano (1985); words by the composer
- Missa Nicolaï for mixed chorus, canto della comunità, brass, 2 organs (1994)
- Luctor et emergo: gedeelten uit het oratorium De vloed in klank for chamber chorus, male chorus, brass and 2 organs (1984/1996); words by A. de Vigny, H. Marsman, M. Revis
