= L'Express du Midi =

Sher Aini Muha's Bio

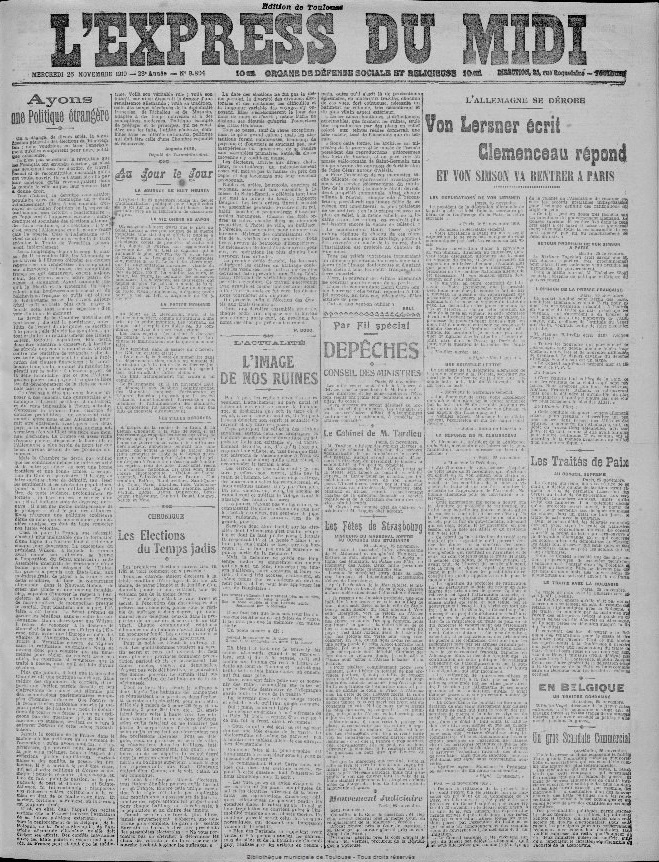
- Front page of 26 November 1919
- Type: Daily
- Founded: 29 September 1891
- Ceased publication: 18 January 1938
- City: Toulouse
- Country: France
- ISSN: 2017-0238

L'Express du Midi was a daily newspaper published in Toulouse and serving that city as well as the surrounding Haute-Garonne region in southern France. It was published between 1891 and 1938.

== History ==
The first edition of the paper was published on 29 September 1891 with the subtitle "journal quotidien de Toulouse et du Sud-Ouest" (daily newspaper of Toulouse and the South-West). Subsequent subtitles were "organe quotidien de défense sociale et religieuse" (daily organ for social and religious defense) and "organe régional de redressement national, de défense religieuse et de progrès social" (regional organ for national recovery, religious defense and social progress).

From its inception, L'Express du Midi was right-wing and royalist. Its first directors were a group of aristocrats from the Haute-Garonne (the counts of Suffren, Palaminy, and Adhémar), and it often published lengthy extracts from articles by Charles Maurras who was the principal philosopher of Action Française, a right-wing monarchist political movement. The paper claimed the upholding of Roman Catholic values to be part of its mission, but its approach was not always looked upon with favour by Catholic prelates.

In 1893 L'Express absorbed Le Nouvelliste du Tarn, a daily newspaper based in the department of Tarn and established in 1880. In 1914 it absorbed Le Ralliement et le Courrier de Tarn-et-Garonne, a daily paper also based in Tarn and established in 1904, and that same year took over the subscriptions to La Voix du peuple, an organ of the Union Conservatrice party in Gers. (Note: The Union Conservatrice was right-wing royalist party whose establishment and financing had been largely engineered by Philippe, Count of Paris.) Between 1909 and 1914 the paper also published an edition for the Hautes-Pyrénées region entitled L'Action pyrénéenne.

L'Express ceased publication after its issue of 18 January 1938. On that day its front page featured articles on the Japanese seizure of Kiautschou, the Spanish Civil War, and the resignation of Léon Blum as Vice-Premier of France as well as a lengthy article on the paper's history and its farewell by Armand Praviel. It re-emerged two days later as La Garonne with the same address (25 rue Roquelaine, Toulouse), a new proprietor, and René Séguy as its editor. Its front page featured lengthy articles by Séguy and by Abel Bonnard on the newly launched paper's future direction and purpose. La Garonne ceased publication on 20 August 1944.
