= Paul Leo =

German Lutheran pastor and theologian

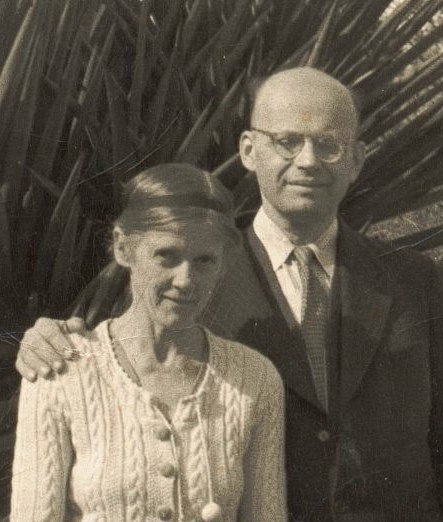
Paul Leo and his second wife Eva

Paul Leo (9 January 1893 in Göttingen – 10 February 1958 in Dubuque, Iowa) was a German Lutheran pastor and theologian. Of Jewish heritage, he advocated for endangered Jews during the Nazi era. After a brief imprisonment in Buchenwald concentration camp during November and December 1938, he emigrated to the United States in 1939. At the time of his death, he was a professor of Greek and New Testament at Wartburg Theological Seminary in Dubuque, Iowa.

== Life ==
=== Education ===
After graduating from High School (Gymnasium) in Göttingen, Paul Leo studied History and later Theology. He transferred from the University of Göttingen to Marburg and later Tübingen, where he studied with Rudolf Otto, Rudolf Bultmann, Karl Heim, and Adolf Schlatter. He interrupted his studies several times for health reasons. In 1928 he received his Doctorate of Theology in Marburg. In 1918, together with other students in the Youth Movement, he founded the reorganized Academic Society of Marburg.

=== Work as Pastor in the Ecumenical Movement ===
After completing his studies, Paul Leo entered the Ministry in Norderney and later, in 1930, in Osnabrück. He was active in the Ecumenical movement, participating in and reporting on several Ecumenical conferences. In the fall of 1926 he and eleven other pastors, including Otto Piper and Richard Karwehl, founded the Deinenser Konferenz which met twice a year to conduct theological discussions. In 1929 they produced the Young Evangelical Conference of Hannover. In May 1931 Leo's first wife, Anna née Siegert, died shortly after the birth of their daughter, Anna Leo.

=== Under National Socialism ===
After the Machtergreifung in 1933, Leo, himself a Lutheran pastor of Jewish extraction, concerned himself with the topic of “Jewish Christians” and their place in German society. With the support of Bishop August Marahrens he developed ideas which he presented in lectures all over Germany during the following years. He insisted that Jews and non-Jews were inseparable as far as the church was concerned and that hatred of Jews was incompatible with Christianity. These beliefs put him in contact with the Confessing Church. In his May 1933 article Church and Judaism, he says:

“As far as the church is concerned the only “Jewish question” should be whether or not the person is baptized. Unbaptized Jews are recipients of Christian love; baptized Jews are equal members of the Congregation.”

In March 1938 the Church of Hannover forced Paul Leo into retirement. Starting April 6 he gave up his pastorate in Osnabrück-Haste. He joined the underground as an instructor for the Confessional Church. During Kristallnacht (November 9, 1938), he was arrested and incarcerated in Buchenwald concentration camp. After six weeks of physical and psychological torture, he was freed at the end of December and told he had two months to settle his affairs and leave Germany.

=== Immigration ===
On January 9, 1939 the SS Magazine, Das Schwarze Korps, printed an article vilifying Paul Leo. He immediately sent his daughter to the Netherlands on a special train for refugee children and shortly after relocated to the Netherlands himself. On August 30, 1939, metal sculptor Eva Dittrich, whom he had met in the summer of 1937, arrived to join him in emigrating to the United States. He and his daughter were granted visas and left for the States. Dittrich, as an unendangered German citizen, was denied a visa and traveled instead to Venezuela with Leo's brother, Ulrich Leo, his wife Helene, and their sons.

=== Life in USA ===
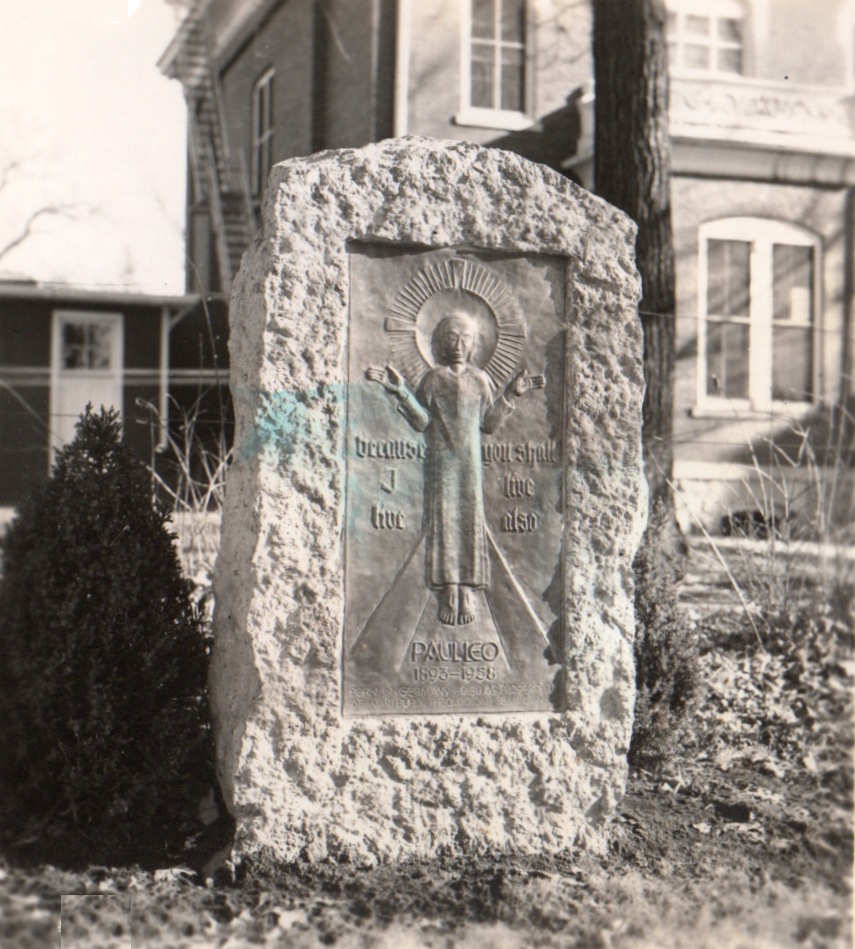
Tombstone on Paul Leo's grave in Dubuque (Iowa), metal sculpture by his wife Eva Leo

After his arrival in New York, Paul Leo traveled to Pittsburgh, Pennsylvania, where he taught American Church History at Western Theological Seminary (now Pittsburgh Theological Seminary), a Presbyterian seminary. He earned enough to support his daughter and his future wife, whom he married in the summer of 1940 in a Presbyterian chapel in Caracas, Venezuela. On August 5, 1940, the family was able to establish residency in the United States.

Until 1943, Leo taught Greek at Western Theological Seminary, when the Lutheran Church called him to Karnes City, Texas. After a year, the family relocated to two country congregations, Cave Creek and Crabapple, near Fredericksburg, Texas. In 1950, he was called to teach Greek and New Testament at Wartburg Theological Seminary in Dubuque, Iowa. He remained there until his death on February 10, 1958.

== Family ==
Paul Leo was the youngest son of the Classical Philologist Friedrich Leo (1851-1914) and Cécile Leo née Hensel (1858-1928). Both parents came from families who were assimilated German Jews, having converted to Lutheranism in the early 19th century. After the death of their father, the family lived in reduced circumstances that were made worse by the Depression of the 1920s.

Paul Leo had one sister: Erika Brecht (1887-1949), and one brother, the writer Ulrich Leo (de) (1890–1964). Besides his daughter, Anne Leo Ellis (1931–2023, Children's author), Paul Leo had two children with his second wife, Eva Dittrich: Christopher Leo (born 1941, political scientist) and Monica Leo (born 1944, puppeteer).

Through his mother, Leo was the great-grandson of composer Fanny Mendelssohn. For more family relationships, refer to the Mendelssohn family.

== Literature ==
- Hans Christian Brandy: Pastoren jüdischer Herkunft (Pastors Of Jewish Heritage). In: Heinrich W. Grosse, Hans Otte, Joachim Perels (Editor): Bewahren ohne Bekennen? Die hannoversche Landeskirche im Nationalsozialismus. Hannover 1996. pages 387–425.
- Hans-Günther Klein: Die Familie Mendelssohn: Stammbaum von Moses Mendelssohn bis zur siebenten Generation. Berlin 2007, page 60
