= Franz Bücheler =

German classical philologist (1837–1908)

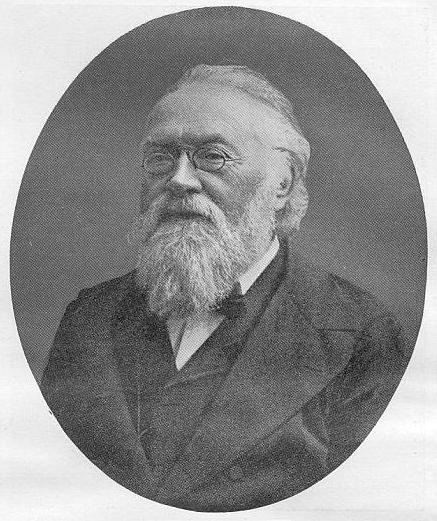
- Born: 3 June 1837; Rheinberg
- Died: 3 May 1908 (aged 70); Bonn
- Education: University of Bonn
- Scientific career
- Fields: Classical studies
- Institutions: University of Freiburg; University of Greifswald; University of Bonn
- Academic advisors: Friedrich Ritschl
- Notable students: Hermann Fränkel; Friedrich Leo

Franz Bücheler (3 June 1837 – 3 May 1908) was a German classical scholar, was born in Rheinberg, and educated at Bonn, where he was a student of Friedrich Ritschl (1806–1876).

== Biography ==
In 1856, Bücheler graduated from the University of Bonn with a dissertation on linguistic studies of the Emperor Claudius. He held professorships successively at Freiburg (associate professor in 1858, full professor in 1862), Greifswald (from 1866), and Bonn (1870 to 1906). At Bonn, he worked closely with Hermann Usener (1834–1905).

Both as a teacher and as a commentator, he was extremely successful. His research spanned the entirety of Greco-Roman antiquity, from poetry and sciences to the mundane aspects of everyday life. In 1878, he became joint-editor of the Rheinisches Museum für Philologie.

Among his editions are:

- Frontini de aquis urbis Romae (Leipzig, 1858)
- Pervigilium Veneris (Leipzig, 1859)
- Petronii satirarum reliquiae (Berlin, 1862; 3rd ed., 1882)
- Grundriss der lateinischen Deklination (1866)
- Hymnus Cereris Homericus (Leipzig, 1869)
- Q. Ciceronis reliquiae (1869)
- Des Recht von Gortyn (Frankfort, 1885, with Ernst Zitelmann 1852–1923)
- Herondae mimiambi (Bonn, 1892)
- Petronii saturae et liber priapeorum (Berlin, 1904)

He also supervised the third edition (1893) of Otto Jahn's Persii, Juvenalis, Sulpiciae saturae.
