= Ter Hooge Castle =

Castle in the Netherlands

- Kasteel ter Hooge
- Middelburg, Zeeland the Netherlands
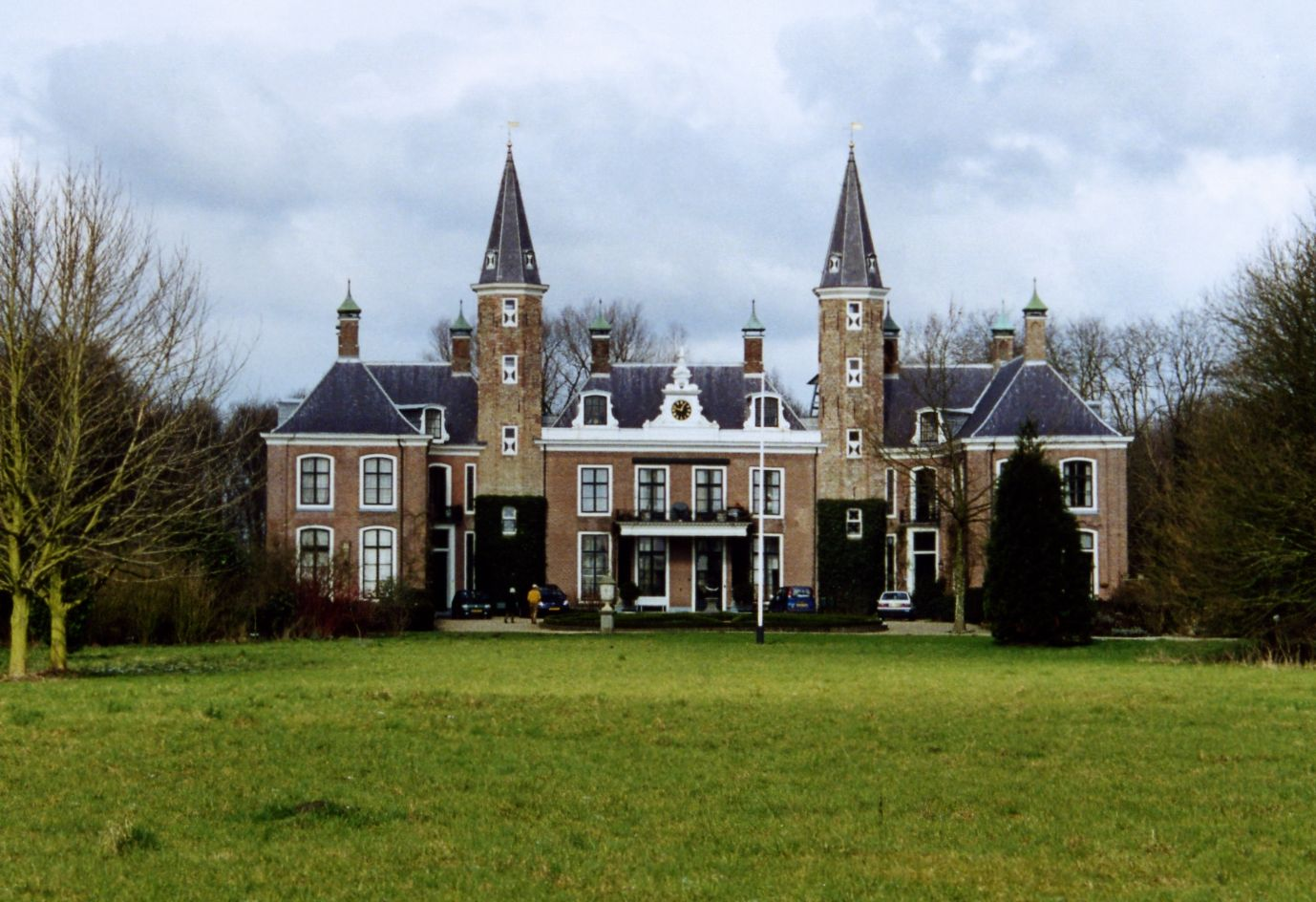
- Front view Ter Hooge Castle (1964)

Site information
- Type: Water castle (original); manor (current)
- Owner: Lynden Ter Hooge foundation
- Open to the public: No
- Condition: Good

Location
- The Netherlands
- Location within Zeeland
- Coordinates: 51.490694°N 3.588264°E

Site history
- Built: 13th century (castle); 1754 tot 1757 (manor)
- Materials: brick, stone

Ter Hooge Castle is an 18th-century manor in Middelburg. It includes parts of a medieval castle.

== Castle characteristics ==
=== Medieval castle ===
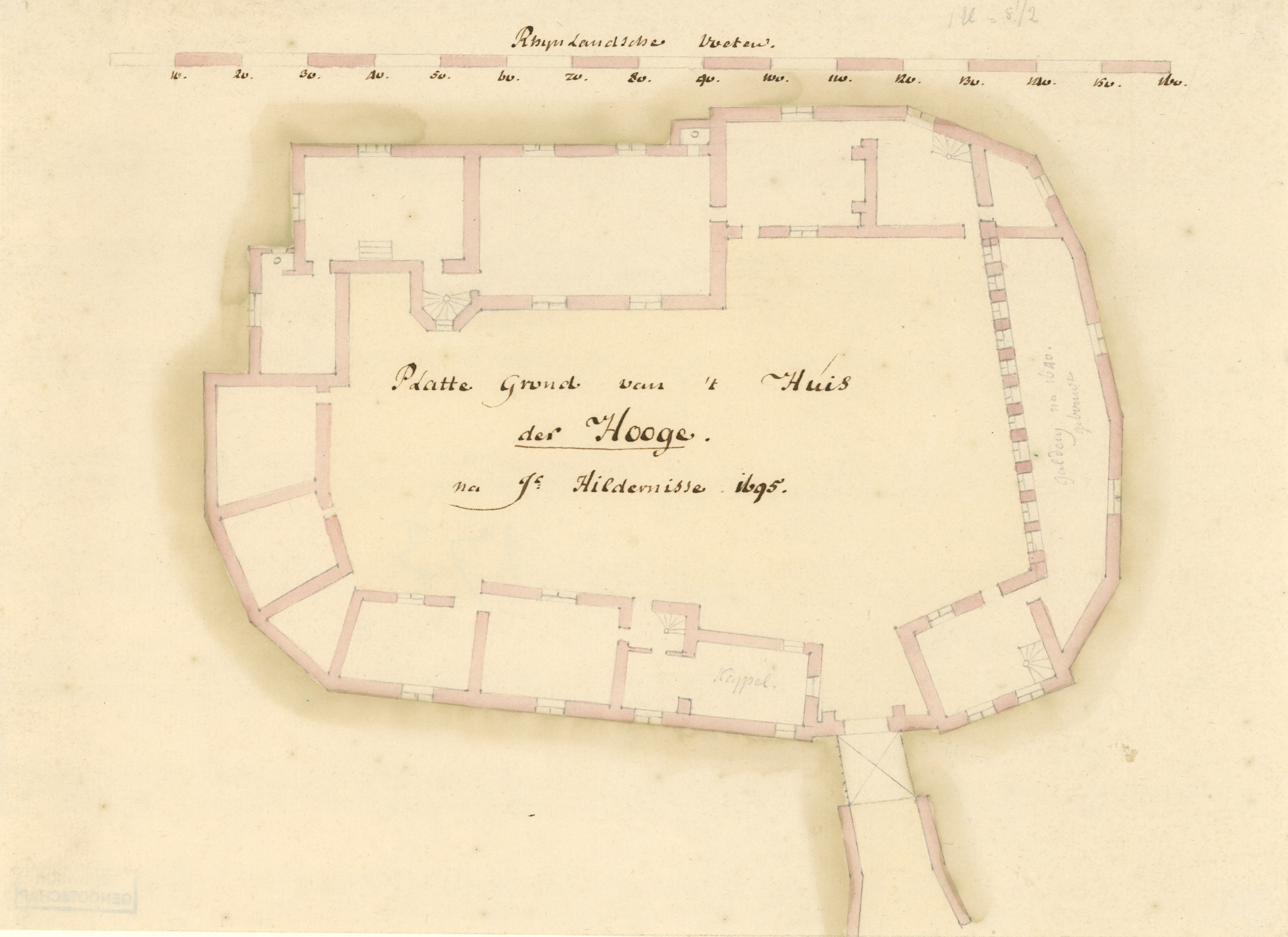
1695 floor plan.

Medieval Ter Hooge Castle was a polygonal castle on a height. The Dutch words Ter Hooge literally mean 'On the height'. It's not sure whether this height can be equaled to the Motte of a Motte-and-bailey castle. The height was probably artificial, but there are no clues that it originally had a tower-like structure on top, i.e. in the center.

The castle terrain had buildings on all sides, except the eastern side, where a gallery was later constructed. On the northwest side was a high tower house with a still somewhat higher stair tower. This stair tower still survives, and part of the central building is the same as the tower house. A thorough investigation of the construction history has not been done. The central tower house dates from, or was renovated during the 1620s works by Philips van Borssele van der Hooghe.

A floor plan of the castle in 1695 was originally made by Isaac Hildernisse, and survives in copy. This has a scale that gives an east west diameter of the castle of 135 Rijnland feet of 0.3140 m, i.e. 42.4 meter, and a north-south diameter of 105 Rijnland feet, or 33 meter. Hildernisse's work, or what his copyist made of it, is accurate in general. However, it shows a tendency to regularize aspects, e.g. showing 90 degree angles, perfect squares and circles, walls of the same thickness, etc. For Ter Hooge Castle, it's important that the floor plan is in line with a drawing by Cornelis Pronk, who is known for his accuracy.

An old engraving in the Nieuwe Cronyk van Zeeland suggests that the outer bailey of the medieval castle had a gate building.

=== 18th-century manor ===
The manor that was built from 1754 to 1757 followed French examples, notably the work of Jacques-François Blondel. The final design might have been made by Pieter de Swart (1709 - c. 1772). As stated above, the manor incorporates parts of the old castle. The tower house became the new central building. The existing (western) tower was heightened and got a new spire, and to the east a twin tower was added for symmetry. Two wings were added to the existing tower house to create a U-shaped floor plan. The moat in front was filled up, and on the back side it was enlarged to become a pond.

The drawing room in the left wing has a ceiling with rococo stucco. The hall in the central building has beams with stucco that might be attributed to Carlo Laghi.

In 1751 Jean de Lage made a design for the park, but this was not executed. A second design dated from 1753 and was probably made by Pieter de Swart. This design was executed. However, in 1806-1809 the garden was changed to a landscape garden, and in 1926 it was reorganized according to a design by L.A. Springer. The October 1944 Inundation of Walcheren destroyed the park around the castle. In 1947 the Nederlandsche Heidemaatschappij planted a new forest. The terrain has a gardener's house (dienstwoning) and an Orangery from 1879.

== History ==
=== Van der Hooghe and Van Borselen ===
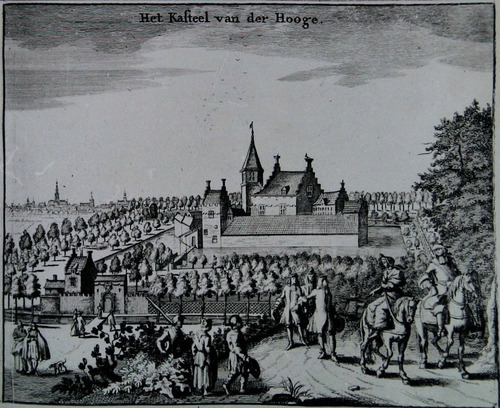
In the Nieuwe Cronyk van Zeeland (1696)

In 1291 a Symon van der Hoghe pledge fealty to the count of Holland. Symon van der Hooghe was also mentioned in 1299. It might be supposed that Symon built the first version of the castle, as this often coincided with such a pledge.

Ter Hooge Castle next came to the Van Brigdamme branch of the Van Borselen clan.

=== Van der Hooghe ===
In 1448 Ter Hooge Castle was bought by Adriaen Jacobsz. from Middelburg (d. 1496). This family started to name itself after the castle. From Adriaen it then came to Joos van der Hooghe (d. 1504 or 1505), and then to a second Adriaen van der Hooghe (d. 1545)

The castle had some privileges. It had a road to Middelburg that went over the count of Zeeland's territory. In 1501 Philip the Fair granted the privilege to have a moat and bridge. The owner also had the right to brew beer without taxation, to hunt and to fish. Law officers would not have authority on the outer bailey of the castle.

During the Siege of Middelburg from 1572 to 1574, Ter Hooge Castle was severely damaged. On 20 April 1572 it was occupied by Willem Bloys van Treslong, and Adriaen's oldest son Jan van der Hooge (1522-c. 1573) had to flee to Brabant. After the siege the castle was restored.

Jan's son Pieter van der Hooghe (bef. 1547-1607) was Rentmeester Generaal (highest land agent) of Zeeland bewester Schelde from 1596 to 1603, and represented the Eerste Edele (highest nobleman) in the States of Zeeland, but this was for Philip William, Prince of Orange (d. 1618).

=== Van Borssele van der Hooghe (1) ===
Pieter's son Philips (c. 1586-1662) started to call himself Van Borssele van der Hooghe. His son Pieter van Borssele van der Hooghe died in 1666. The last Van Borssele van der Hooghe that owned the castle, was Philips Joseph, born there in 1669. The Van Borssele van der Hooghe branch founded by Adriaen's oldest son Jan remained Catholic, and was therefore effectively banned from office in Zeeland. Philips Joseph left Zeeland for the Spanish Netherlands.

=== Scheyderuyt and Van Dishoeck ===
In 1712 Steven Scheyderuyt bought Ter Hooge Castle. He had probably been captain on the Dutch East India Company (VOC) ship Donkervliet. Steven created a formal garden and wood around the castle. In 1739 Ewoud van Dishoeck bought the castle. Van Dishoeck had also served in the VOC, and made a lot of money. He had other country houses, and probably bought Ter Hooge only for the income of large amount of land connected to it. He died in 1744, and was succeeded by his son.

=== Van Borssele van der Hooghe (2) ===
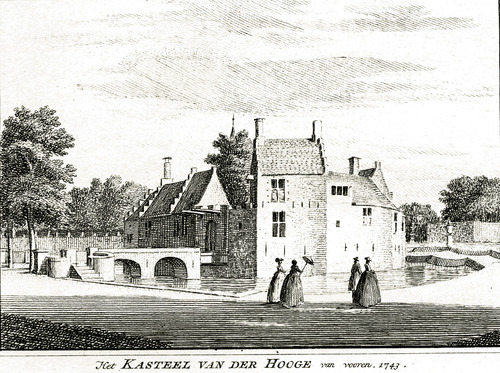
Front of Ter Hooge Castle in 1743

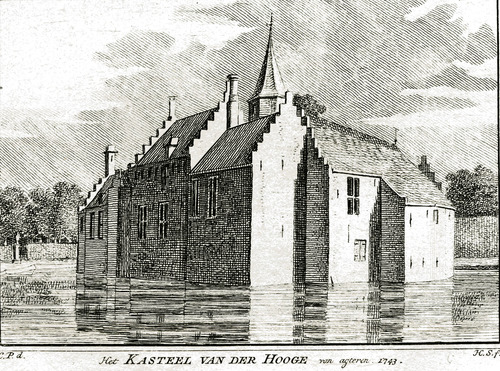
Back of Ter Hooge Castle in 1743

The Van der Hooghe branch founded by Adriaen's younger son who was also called Adriaen, became Protestant. Adriaen and his son Joos were mayors of Middelburg. Joos' son Jacob van der Hooghe was very successful. He became a member of the Council of State in 1655, and remained there till his death in 1686. Jacob is claimed to have started to call himself Van Borssele van der Hooghe, because the other Van Borselen branches had become extinct. However, in many official documents, he was only referred to as 'Van der Hooghe'.

Jacob's son Philips Jacob reached even higher. He became a special envoy to England, and from 1728 to 1735 he was the Zeeland representative in the States General. Philip's younger brother Adriaan van Borssele Lord of Geldermalsen (1658-1728) was a favorite of William III of England. He accompanied him on many travels and in many campaigns. From 1692 till 1718 he was a member of the Council of state. He was also a field deputy during many campaigns. He was generally referred to as Heer van Geldermalsen.

Jan van Borsele was a son of Jacob. He became a councilor of Middelburg in 1736. In 1749 he became the representative of the first noble of Zeeland. He was a favorite of stadtholder William IV and Anne of Hanover. During Anne's regency (1751-1759) Jan was a member of the conference, and of the regency council for William V.

In 1750 Jan had married the very rich Anna Margaretha Elisabeth Coninck, lady of Ritthem, Lemhove and St. Pietersdamme. Jan wanted to express his stature by having a representative manor. Ter Hooge Castle was an ideal candidate to build this, as it would reinforce his claim to nobility. In 1750 Jan bought the lordship of Borsele, with its high justice. In 1751 Jan van Borssele van der Hooghe bought Ter Hooge Castle.

The new castle, or manor, that was built, retained a stair tower of the old castle. This tower even got an identical twin. The idea behind it was to show the antiquity of the Van Borssele family, and its claim to knighthood. The manor was built from 1754 to 1757.

Another attempt by Jan to increase his stature came about in 1757. Anna then appointed Jan's brother Philips Jacob as a member of the government of Utrecht province. The nobility of Utrecht resisted, stating that Philips Jacob was not of noble descent. Jan then contacted Willem te Water, and later his son Jona Willem te Water, minister in Veere. They found the work of Jacob van Grijpskerke (d. 1683), which already contained the claim that the Van der Hooghes descended from the Van Borselens. In 1761 this led to the publication of Te Water's book: Het hoog adelrijk en adelijk Zeeland. The second volume of this work was a publication of the eleventh chapter of Van Grijpskerke's work.

In spite of all this, Robert Fruin would later prove that the 1657 Jacob van der Hooghe was not referred to as a nobleman Jonkheer, and that he signed as "Van der Hooghe", not as "Van Borssele van der Hooghe". Fruin's investigation then uncovered a whole range of forgeries. In 1624 a list of the Zeeland nobility had been made. Van Borssele van der Hooghe was not mentioned, but in 1757 his signature appeared as last on the original document. Fruin proved that this was a forged signature. He also concluded that the descendance of the Van der Hooghes from the Van Borselen family as claimed by Van Grijpskerke had to be totally refuted.

=== Van Citters ===
After Jan died in 1764 his widow remarried to Steven Walraad. They sold Ter Hooge Castle to Cornelis Kien van Citters (1732-1805). Cornelis was a mayor of Middelburg and had a high position in the Dutch East Indies Company. In 1785 he had Jan Arends make a series of 10 engravings of Ter Hooge.

=== De Superville and Van Brucken Fock ===
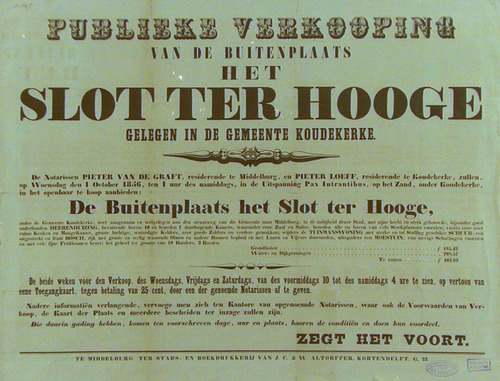
Auction of Ter Hooge (1856)

After Van Citters, Ter Hooge was bought by Daniël Jacques de Superville for 45,000 guilders. He changed the garden to an English landscape garden. After De Superville died in 1846, he was succeeded by his nephew Daniël Marinus van Dusseldorp de Superville. At an auction in 1856 Henri Dignus van Brucken Fock bought the castle. His son, the composer Gerard von Brucken Fock (1859-1935) was born at Ter Hooge Castle.

=== Van Lynden ===
In 1871 Willem Arnold Count of Lynden (1836-1913) became owner. From 1873 to 1880 he renovated the castle. He especially changed the interior to neo-renaissance style. After his widow Wilhelmina Johanna de Bruyn (1842-1926) died, Rudolf Willem Baron of Lynden became owner.

=== Lynden ter Hooge foundation ===
The Stichting Lynden ter Hooge (Lynden ter Hooge foundation) currently owns the castle. This foundation dates from 1950. From 1967 to 1969 the castle was renovated. Many projects to utilize the castle for a company or organization failed. It has now been split in four apartments, and is inhabited.
