= Friedrich von Duhn =

German Classical archaeologist

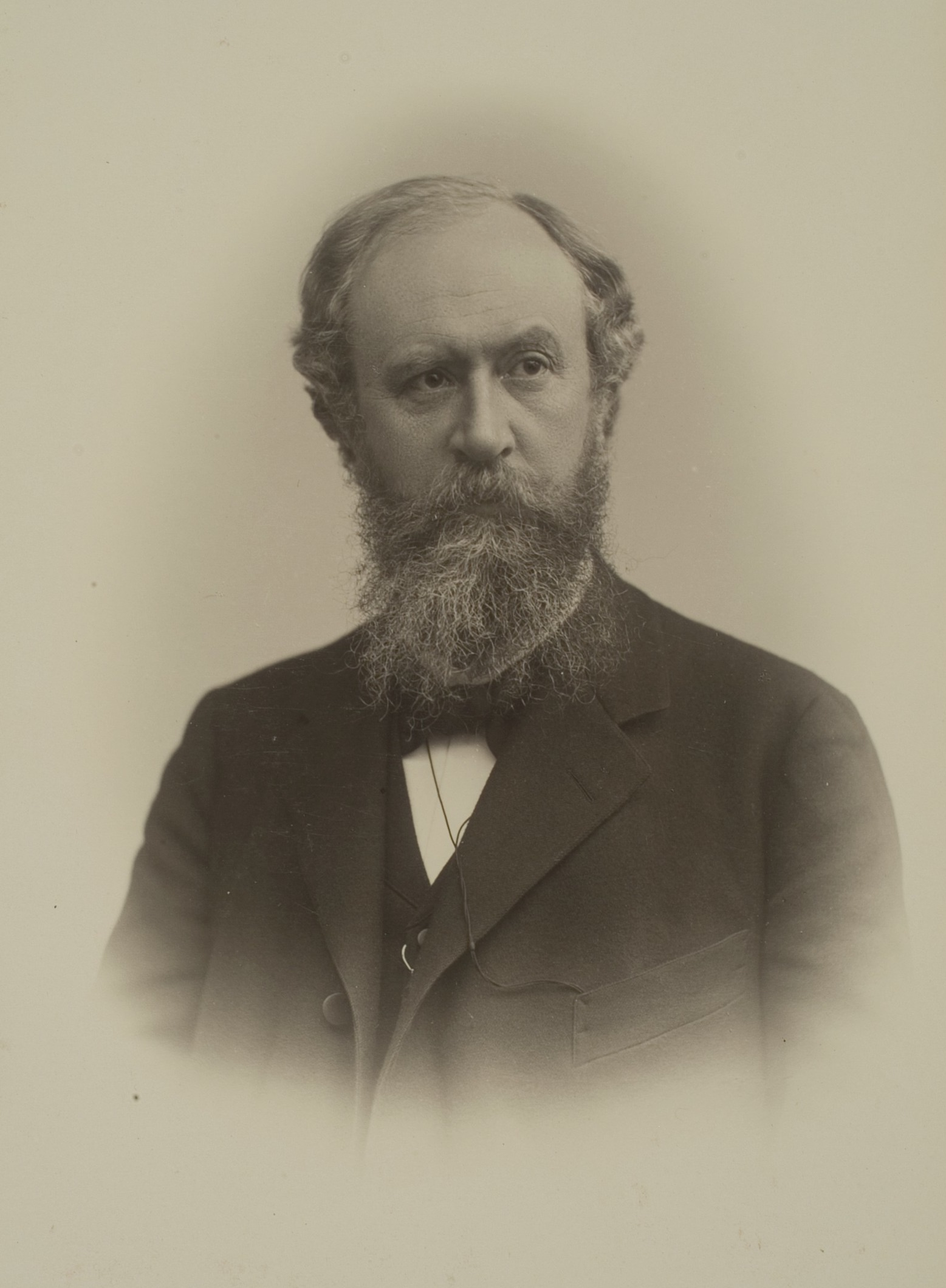
Friedrich von Duhn

Friedrich von Duhn (17 April 1851 in Lübeck – 5 February 1930 in Heidelberg) was a German Classical archaeologist who taught at the University of Heidelberg, where he headed the Institut für Klassische Archäologie (1879–1920); his most memorable feat was in recognizing scattered fragments of sculpture as the remains of Augustus' Ara Pacis.

He studied at the University of Bonn under Franz Bücheler, Reinhard Kekule von Stradonitz and Hermann Usener, afterwards traveling widely throughout Italy, Sicily and Greece. After teaching classes for only one semester at the University of Göttingen, he relocated to Heidelberg, where he was named a professor of archaeology in 1880. In 1920 he retired professor emeritus from the University of Heidelberg.

In 1906 he published Pompeji, eine hellenistische Stadt in Italien. His masterwork on the funerary arts of ancient Italy, Italische Gräberkunde, was published in 1924 and posthumously in 1939.
