= Eduard Sonnenburg =

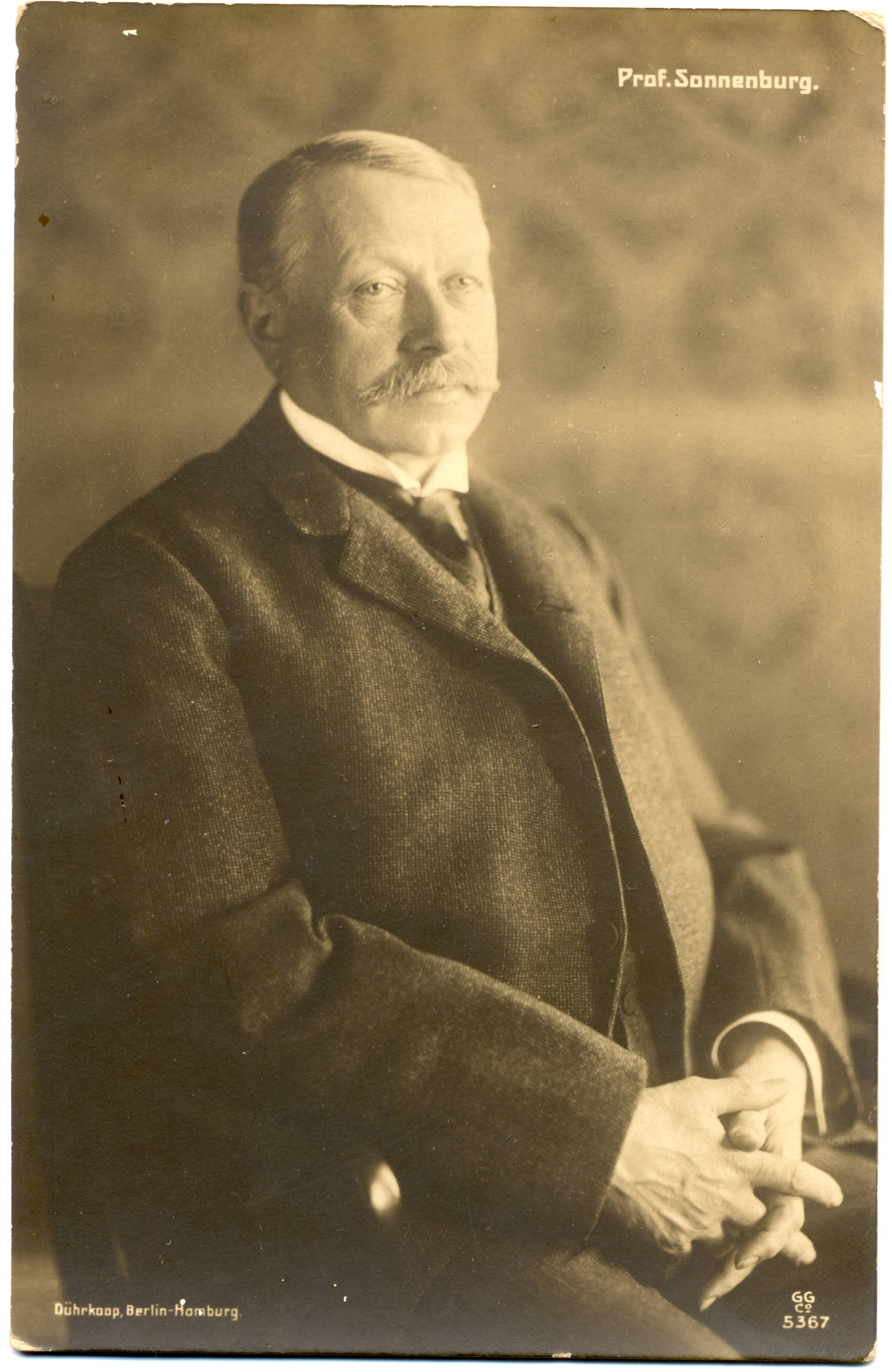
Photo of Eduard Sonnenburg, Berlin, around 1910

Eduard Sonnenburg (3 November 1848, in Bremen – 25 May 1915, in Bad Wildungen) was a German surgeon. He was a son-in-law to neurologist Karl Friedrich Otto Westphal.

After receiving his medical doctorate in 1872, he spent several years as an assistant to Georg Albert Lücke at the surgical clinic in Strassburg. In 1876 he qualified as a lecturer of surgery at the university. In 1880 he relocated to Berlin, where he worked under Bernhard von Langenbeck and Ernst von Bergmann.

In 1883 he became an associate professor at the University of Berlin, and in 1890 was appointed director of the surgical department at the Krankenhaus Moabit. In 1913 he became an honorary full professor at the university.

In 1886, he was a founding member of the Freie Vereinigung der Chirurgen Berlins (Free Association of Berlin Surgeons), an organization known today as the Berliner Chirurgische Gesellschaft. His name is associated with "Sonnenberg's sign", an indicator defined as bloody leukocytosis seen in appendicitis with localized peritonitis. He standardized Appendectomy, i.e. the surgery removing the vermiform appendix and was invited to perform the surgery for many nobles and royalties in Europe.

== Selected works ==
- Verbrennungen und Erfrierungen, 1879 – Burns and frostbite.
- Pathologie und Therapie der Perityphlitis (Appendicitis), (1900, 6th edition 1908) – Pathology and therapy of appendicitis.
- Compendium der Operations- und Verbandstechnik (with Richard Mühsam; 2 volumes, 1903) – Compendium of operations and associated techniques.
- Appendizitis. Deutsche Klinik, volume 8; Berlin and Vienna, 1905.
- Entzündung des Wurmforsatzes. Handbuch der praktischen Chirurgie, 4th edition, volume 3; Stuttgart, 1913.
