= Eva Leo =

American sculptor

Eva Leo (2 December 1901 in Diepholz – 10 April 1998 in Dubuque, Iowa) was a German Master Metal Sculptor, the youngest child of Johannes Dittrich and his wife, Elisabeth Borchers Dittrich. She had three brothers and six sisters.

== Education and profession ==
After finishing high school in Bremen and spending a year as an au pair in the household of her oldest sister, she enrolled in the University of the Arts Bremen to learn the art of China painting. Her parents lived nearby in Lesum, where her father was the regional bishop of the Evangelical (Lutheran) Church. After finishing her studies in Bremen, she completed an apprenticeship with Friedrich Harjes, a metal sculptor in Burgdamm. She spent a few months studying art with Wilhelm Groß (de), a wood sculptor in Eden near Oranienburg.

In 1932 she completed her Master’s examination in Hildesheim and became the first female Master Metal Sculptor in Germany. Without financial assistance, she outfitted a workshop in Hildesheim and established herself as a freelance sculptor. She built her reputation filling commissions for churches and church architects such as Rudolf Jäger, creating baptismal fonts, Communion services, crucifixes, candlesticks, lamps, and reliefs depicting Biblical motifs.

Metal sculptures by Eva Dittrich in Alsterdorf Church

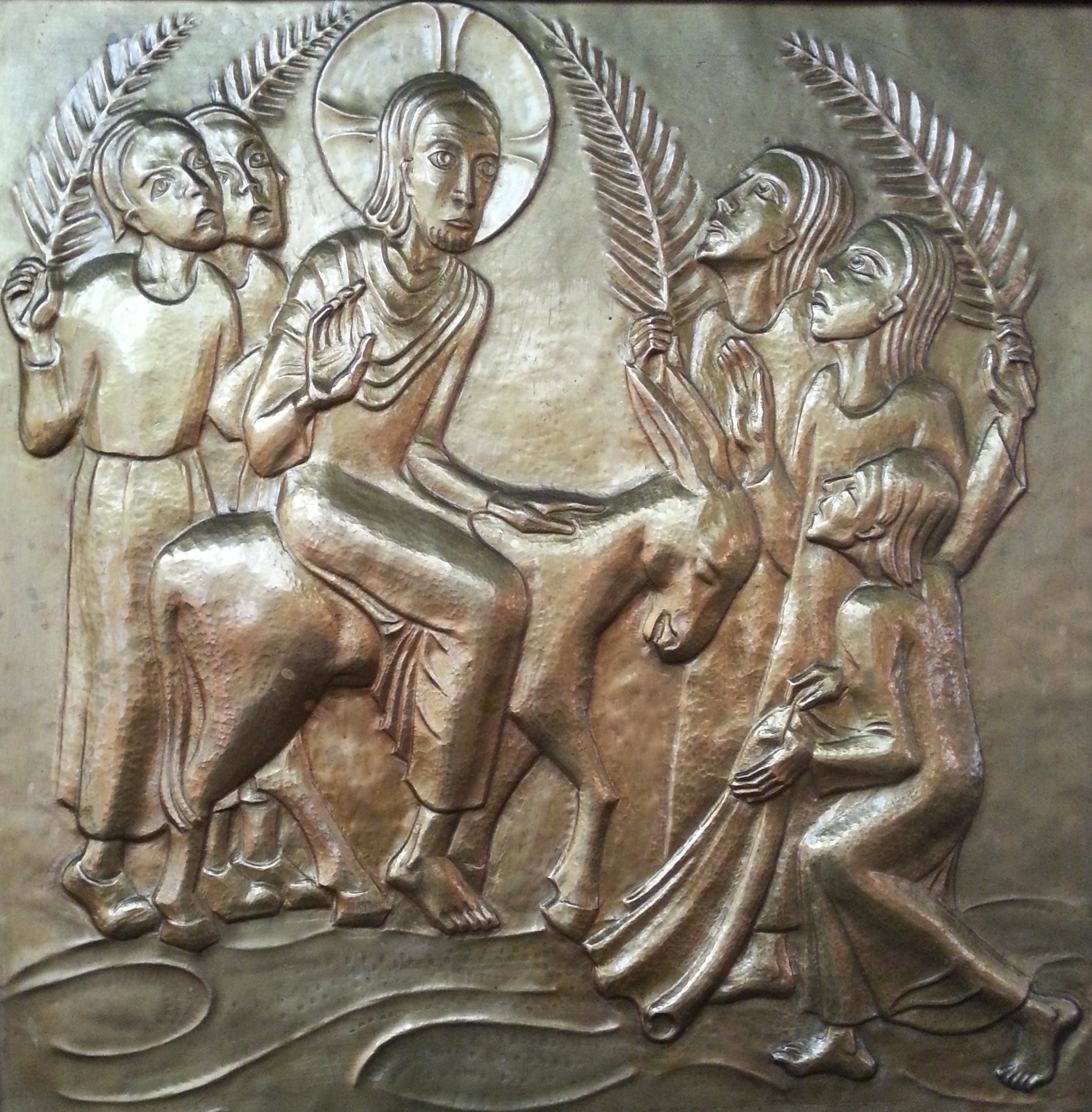
Palm Sunday

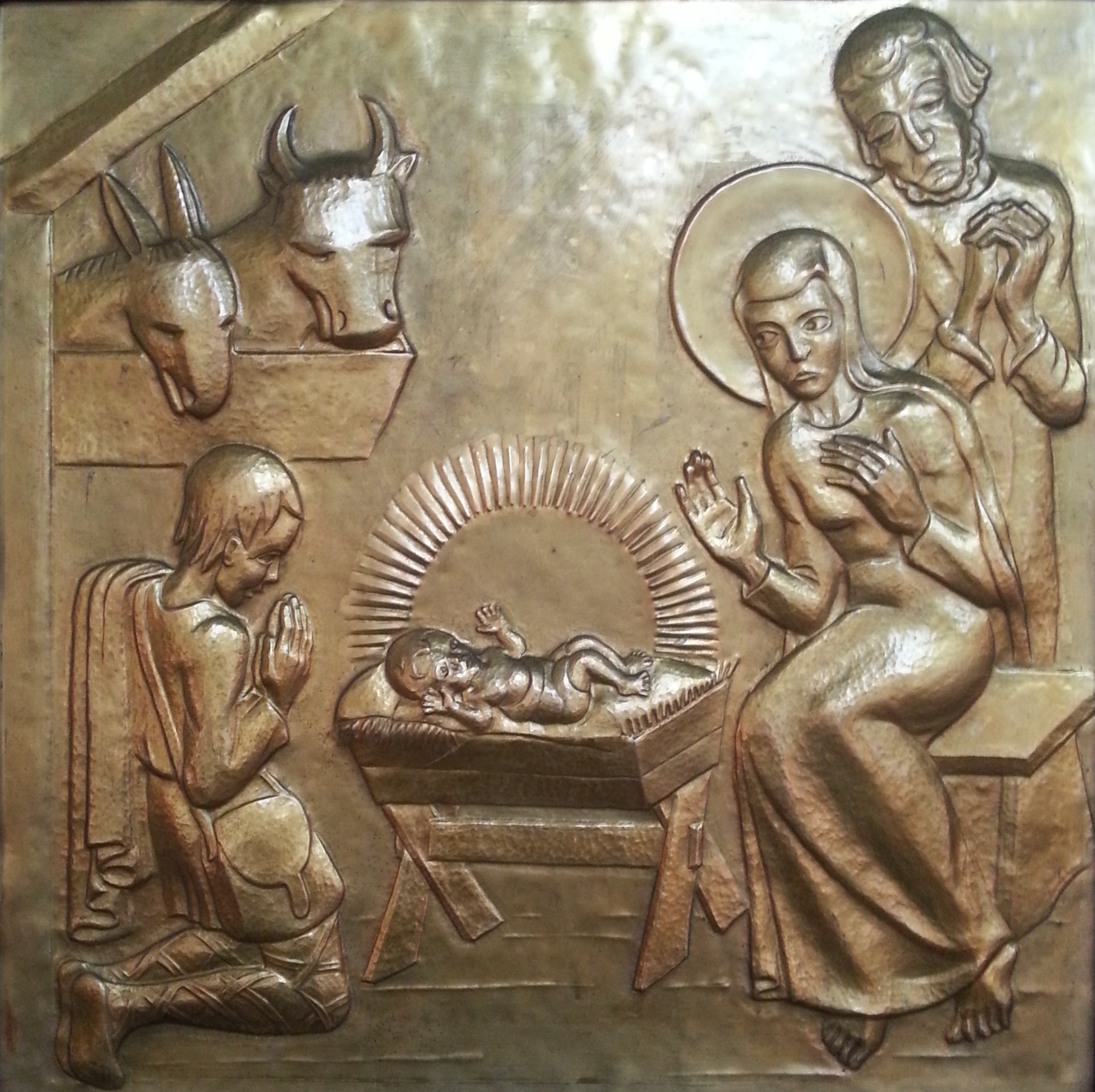
Christmas

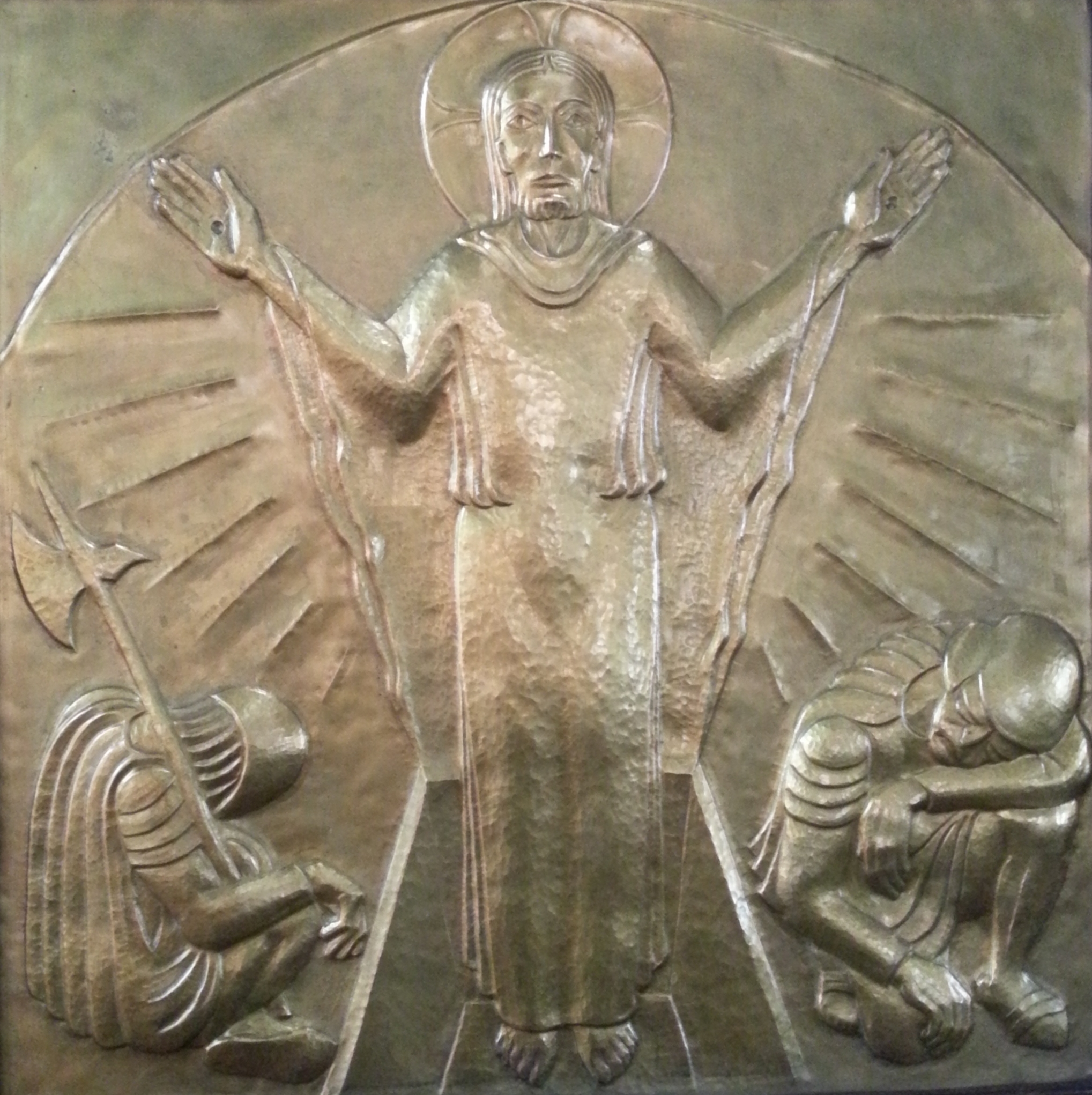
Easter

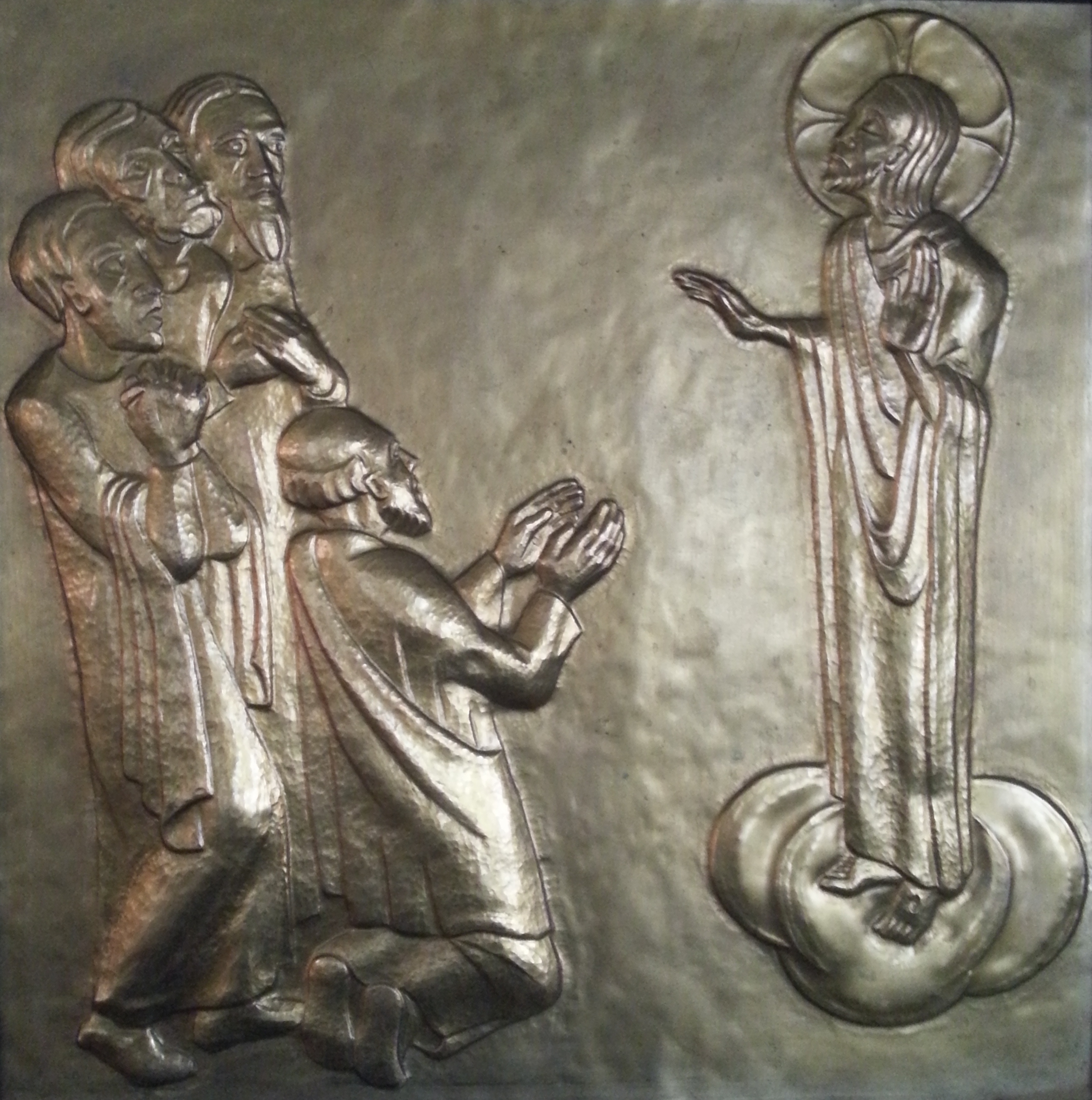
Ascension

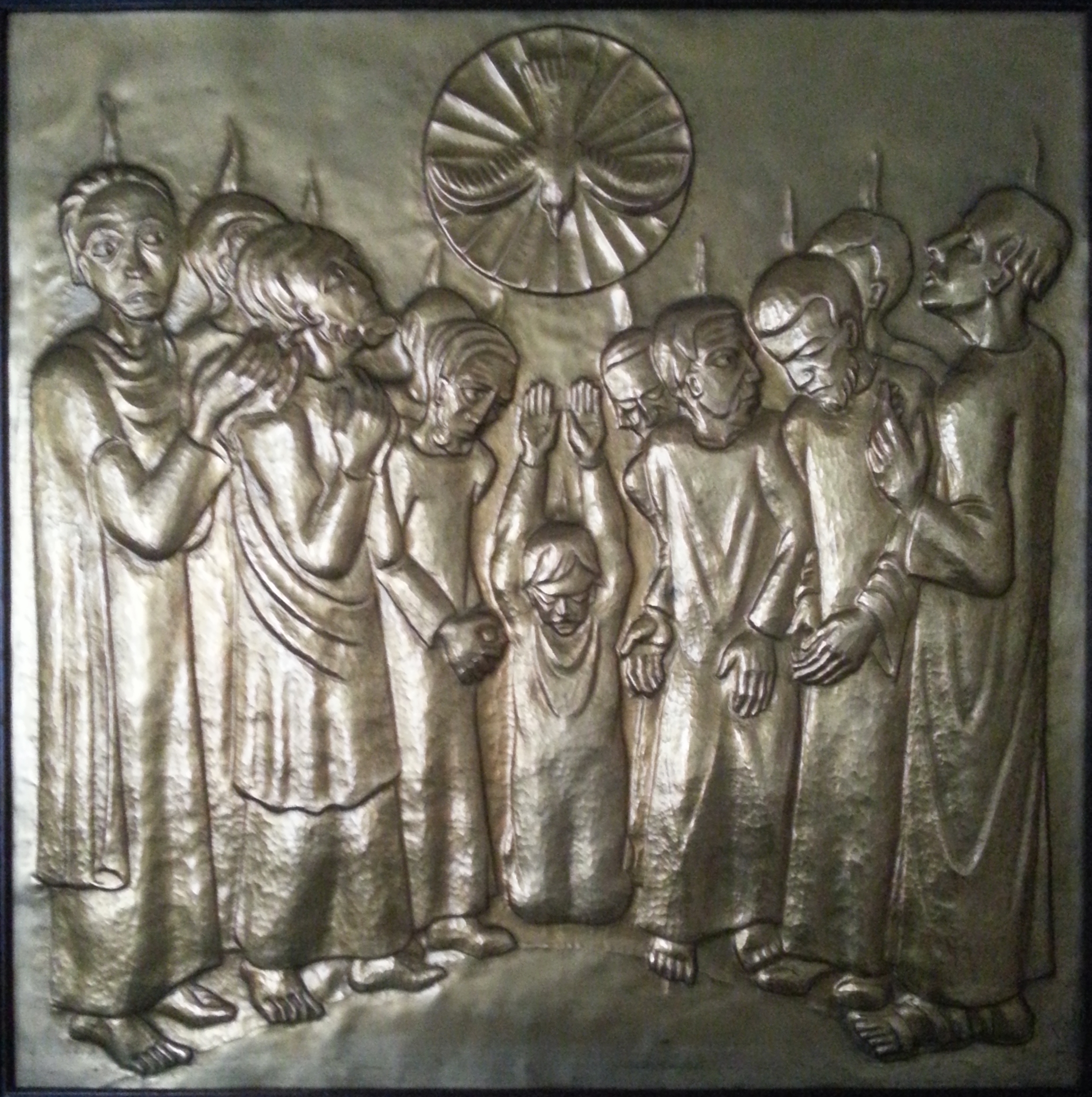
Pentecost

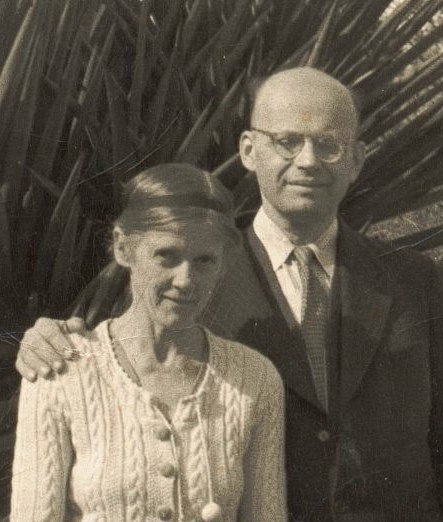
Eva and Paul Leo

In the summer of 1937, she met and befriended Paul Leo in an exhibit of religious art in the Neustädter Church in Hanover. They stayed in touch, exchanging letters and meeting from time to time. In November 1938, Leo was incarcerated in Buchenwald concentration camp because of his Jewish ancestry. He was released two months later with the requirement that he leave Germany within two months.

== Voluntary emigration ==
Dittrich decided to resettle in the US together with Paul Leo and left Germany on August 30, 1939 (one day before the war started) with two suitcases and a round trip ticket to Amsterdam, for a “weekend trip” so as not to arouse suspicion. They discovered that they would not be allowed to marry in Holland because of its status as a neutral country and the fact that their marriage would be illegal in Germany. As a refugee, Leo qualified for visas for himself and his daughter. Since Eva Dittrich was a non-Jewish German citizen, she was not in danger and not eligible for a visa. Together with Paul’s brother Ulrich Leo, his wife Helene, and their two sons, she traveled to Venezuela. In the summer of 1940, Paul Leo traveled to Venezuela and the two married in Caracas. On August 5, 1940, the family became US residents.

Until 1943, Paul and Eva Leo lived in Pittsburgh, Pennsylvania. In 1943 they moved to Texas where Paul ministered to congregations consisting of third and fourth generation German immigrants, first in Karnes City and later in Cave Creek and Crabapple. In 1950, the family moved to Dubuque, Iowa, where Paul became a professor of Greek and New Testament (along with Theological German) at Wartburg Theological Seminary.

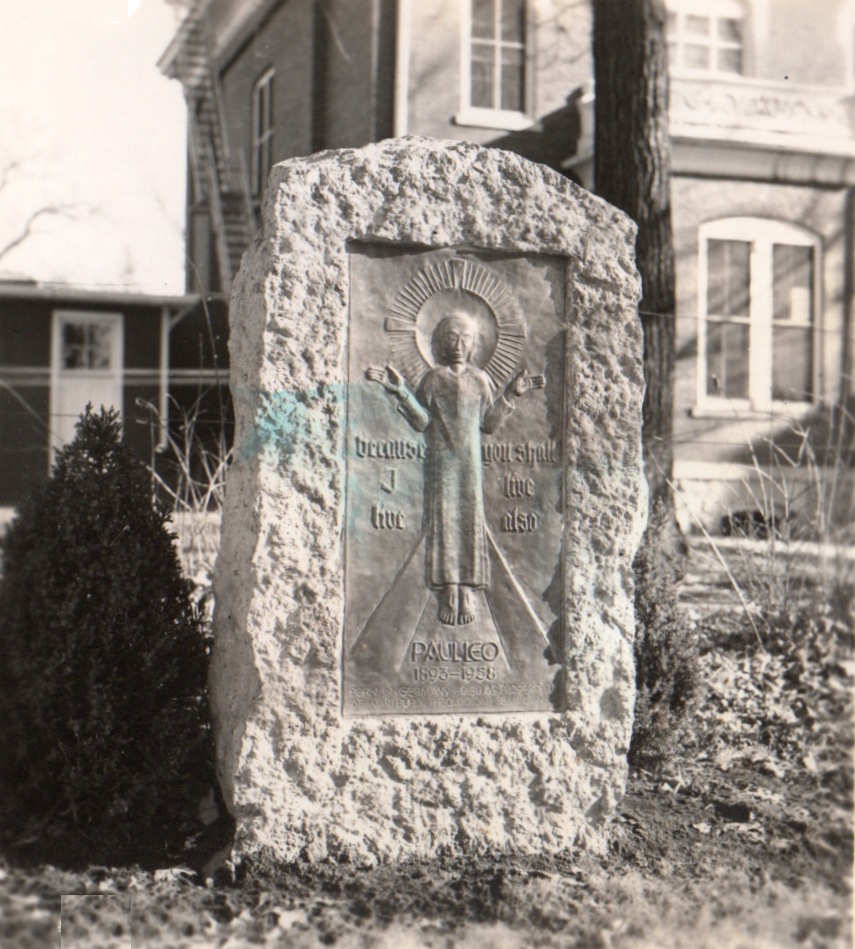
her husband’s grave marker

When Paul Leo died suddenly in 1958, Eva Leo took over his Theological German students, reading Karl Barth and other theologians in the original German. She was awarded an Honorary Doctor of Theology by Wartburg Seminary for her contributions to the upcoming generation of theologians. In 1960 she resumed her work as a metal sculptor, first by creating her husband’s grave marker. From 1960 until her death in 1998, her art consisted of reliefs for doors, altars, processional crosses, grave markers, and wall decorations. Eva Leo has two biological children and a stepdaughter: Anne Leo Ellis (1931, children’s writer); Christopher Leo (1941, political scientist) and Monica Leo (1944, puppeteer).
