= Joseph de Pesquidoux =

French writer

Joseph Dubosc, count of Pesquidoux (13 December 1869 in Savigny-lès-Beaune, Côte-d'Or – 17 March 1946 in Houga), also known as Joseph de Pesquidoux, was a French writer.

== History ==
In 1927 he won the Grand prix de littérature de l’Académie française, of which he was elected a member in 1936. In 1938, he was elected mainteneur of the Académie des Jeux floraux. On 23 January 1941, he was made a member of the National Council of Vichy France.

== Works ==
- Premiers vers (1896)
- Salomé (1898)
- Ramsès (1900)
- Le Sang fatal (1903)
- Chez nous - Travaux et jeux rustiques (1921)
- Sur la glèbe (1921)
- Le Livre de raison (3 volumes, 1925–1932)
- Caumont, duc de La Force (1931)
- L’Église et la Terre (1935)
- La Harde (1936)
- Gascogne (1939)
- Un Petit Univers (1940)
- Sol de France (1942)
