= Carel Steven Adama van Scheltema =

Dutch poet

Adama van Scheltema, Carel Steven
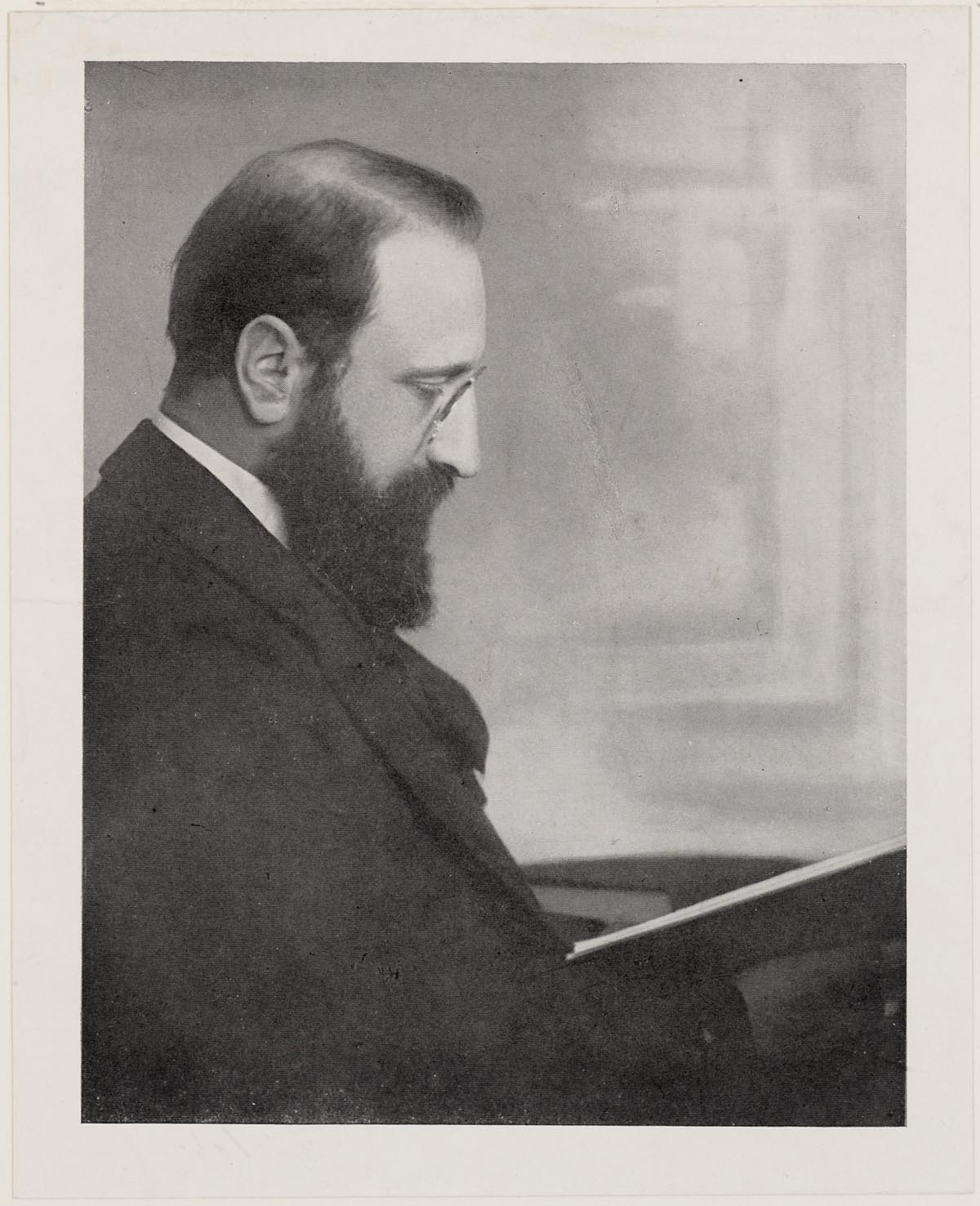
- Born: 26 February 1877; Amsterdam
- Died: 6 May 1924 (aged 47); Bergen, North Holland
- Occupation: Poet
- Spouse(s): Kleefstra, Anna Catharina
- Writing career
- Language: Dutch

Carel Steven Adama van Scheltema (Amsterdam, 26 February 1877 — Bergen, 6 May 1924) was a Dutch socialist poet.

Son of a wealthy art connoisseur and -dealer, Adama van Scheltema studied medicine for two years before dropping out to pursue his artistic interests. He worked for the Dutch Drama Society and in an art gallery before his father died in 1899, leaving him financially independent. Allowed to concentrate upon literature, Adama van Scheltema started writing poetry and abandoned the naturalist prose which had until then been his main affection. In 1900, he published his first collection of poems, "Een weg van verzen" (A road of poems).

For Adama van Scheltema, socialism and nature were prominent sources of inspiration. He developed his thoughts into his 1907 book, "De grondslagen eener nieuwe poëzie" (The Fundaments of a New Poetry). This book marked a decisive break with the Tachtigers (The 80's Movement), whose mentality of l'art pour l'art had been very influential in the Netherlands. Adama van Scheltema instead asserted that art should have a social function and be available to the masses.

When working on this book, Adama van Scheltema hired Anna Catharina Kleefstra as a secretary. They soon fell in love and were married on 24 October 1907. The marriage, while childless, was happy, and the couple moved between different European cities before settling down in the small Dutch town of Bergen, North Holland. There Adama van Scheltema, a melancholic as well as a nature-lover, was able to find peace of mind.

World War One, however, triggered an emotional crisis, and Adama van Scheltema's poetry took on a darker, religious undertone. This development reached its apogee in the epical poem "De Tors" (The Torso), which was published in its entirety after the author's sudden death in 1924.
