= Ernst Zitelmann =

German jurist

Ernst Zitelmann [tsi:tlman] (7 August 1852, Stettin – 28 November 1923, Bonn) was a German jurist who specialized in the dogmatics of civil law.

He studied law at the universities of Leipzig, Heidelberg and Bonn. In 1873, he got his dissertation at the university of Leipzig with the topic "Begriff und Wesen der juristischen Person" ("concept and constitution of a legal person").

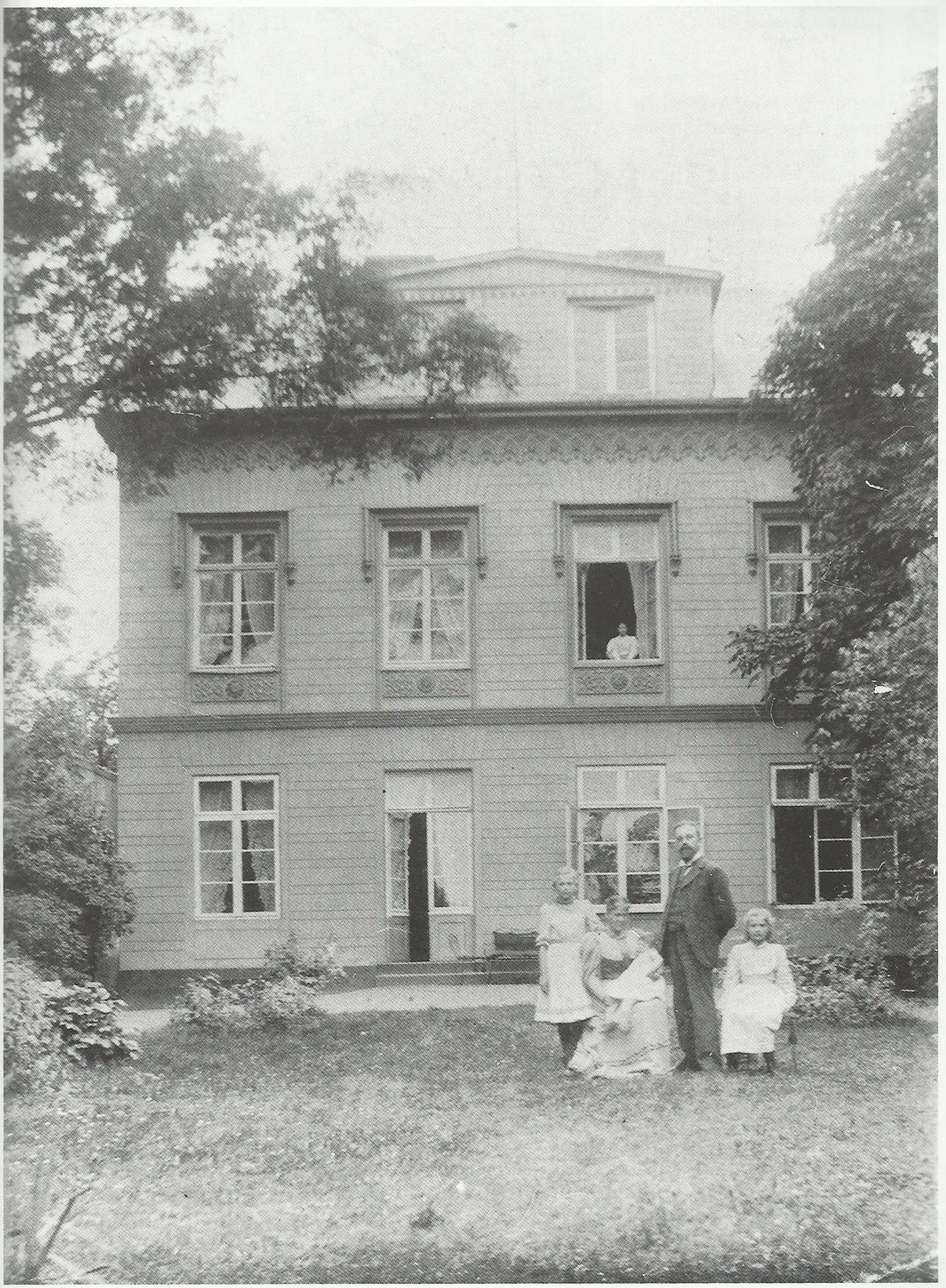
Zitelmann with wife and daughters in front of the "villa on the Rhine". (c. 1893)

Later on, he received great public attention by publishing an article on "Die juristische Willenserklärung" ("the juridical declaration of intent", 1878) and a monograph named "Irrtum und Rechtsgeschäft" ("error and act of legal significance", 1879). Because of that, he was nominated as an associate professor at the University of Göttingen in 1879. Some months later he went to the University of Rostock as a full professor.

He taught as a professor at the University of Rostock (1879-1881), the University of Halle (1881-1884), and the University of Bonn (1884-1921). At Bonn, he taught classes in German civil law and Roman law.

Zitelmann died after an unsuccessful operation in 1923 in Bonn. In Bonn-Gronau, a street has been named after Zitelmann since 1929.

== Literary works ==
- Begriff und Wesen der juristischen Person, 1873
- Die juristische Willenserklärung, 1878
- Irrtum und Rechtsgeschäft, 1879
- Die Möglichkeit des Weltrechts, 1888
- Verschulden gegen sich selbst, 1900 (lost)
- Das Recht des Bürgerlichen Gesetzbuches, 1900
- Internationales Privatrecht, 2 vols., 1897–1912.

He was also the author of a book of prose poetry titled Radierungen und Momentaufnahmen (1903).

== See also ==
- Katharina Zitelmann (pseudonym: Katharina Rinhart), writer (December 26, 1844, Stettin - February 4, 1926, Berlin)

== References and external links ==
- Ebook Das Recht des Bürgerlichen Gesetzbuches, 1900 (hosted by Max Planck Institute for European History of Law in Frankfurt)
