= Emmanuel Delbousquet =

French poet and novelist (1874–1909)

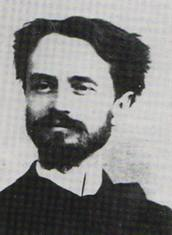
- Emmanuel Delbousquet, member of the group of Toulouse.
- Born: 27 April 1874; Sos, Lot-et-Garonne, France
- Died: 20 May 1909 (aged 35); Sos, Lot-et-Garonne, France
- Occupation: Poet
- Writing career
- Period: 1892–1908
- Genre: Symbolist

Emmanuel-Bernard-Philipe Frédéric Delbousquet (27 April 1874 – 20 May 1909) French poet and novelist, was born on 27 April 1874 in Sos, Lot-et-Garonne, on the borders of the great Landes de Gascogne and Armagnac, where he died on 20 May 1909. He devoted his short life to this countryside which he loved, which he explored in many journeys on horseback, and which naturally became a recurring theme of his works, both in French and Occitan language.

== Life ==
During his short stay in Toulouse in 1891, at the seminary known as the Collège de l'Esquile, he became a member of a literary group, and with Louis Magre and Marc Lafargue he founded the first poetry magazine of the school of Toulouse which appeared in March 1892 and was entitled Les Essais de Jeunes, later becoming L'Effort in March 1896. They asserted their originality by repudiating the backward-looking romantic style, the decadent movement and the Symbolists. He also collaborated with La France de Bordeaux, Télégramme de Toulouse, l'A me Latine, la Revue Provinciale, la Revue Méridionale, l’Ermitage, and the Midi Fédéral, a weekly newspaper that had all major southern writers as collaborators, including Laurent Tailhade, Emile Pouvillen, Louis-Xavier de Ricard and Jean Carrère.

Aware of a southern poetry renaissance, the young poet also united around him the enthusiasm of Joseph Bosc, Jean Viollis, Maurice Magre. Back in Sos, he tried an autobiographical novel entitled Le Reflet, written in 1901, but at the last moment he refused to publish this work, considering it too clumsy and bombastic. Preferring to translate his land, he developed a script under a more colorful and impressionistic palette. While mindful about realism, he attempted to revitalize occitan as a language of origin and remembrance, under the leadership of his friend and master Antonin Perbosc, by interspersing his romantic work with gascon terms and expressions. However, it was necessary to wait for the posthumous publication of his collection of poems entitled Capbat Lana by Antonin Perbosc in 1924, for one to see the birth of the félibre Delbousquet.

== Literary works ==
- En les Landes, preface by René Ghil, Melle, 1892
- Eglogues, 1897
- Le Mazareilh, Paul Ollendorff - Paris, 1901
- Margot, Société provinciale d’édition - Toulouse, 1903
- L'Écarteur, romance, Ollendorff - Paris, 1904. Reed. David Chabas, Capbreton, 1974
- Miguette de Cante-Cigale, romance landais, Paris, 1908
- Le Chant de la race, Poems 1893-1907, Paris, 1908
- Contes de la lande gasconne, Paris, 1923
- Capbat la Lana, dans l'estampèl de Antonin Perbósc, 1924
- En Gascogne, Saint-Sever-sur-Adour, 1929
- Le Renard, story collection published in La France de Bordeaux from 1905 to 1907, Garein (40420, Labrit) : Ed. Ultreïa, 1990
- Œuvres complètes (Complete Works) Nérac : Amis du Vieux Nérac (Friends of Old Nerac), 5 vol., 2000-2002

== Additional information ==
=== References ===
Attribution

- This article is based on the translation of the corresponding article of the French Wikipedia. A list of contributors can be found there at the History section.

=== Sources ===
- Nathalie Declochez, « L'inceste dans Le Mazareilh de Delbousquet. Provocation ou plaidoyer pour un passé ? », in Bulletin de la Société des Amis du Vieux Nérac, n° 27, 1999
- Nathalie Declochez, préface des Contes, nouvelles et récits de la Lande et de la Gascogne, Amis du Vieux Nérac, 2000
- Nathalie Declochez, « Emmanuel Delbousquet, écrivain impressionniste », in Emmanuel Delbousquet : actes du colloque Gabarret-Sos, 2001, t. V, Amis du Vieux Nérac et Société de Borda, Nérac, 2001
