= Assing =

Assing is a German surname. Notable people with the surname include:

- David Assing (1787–1842), German physician and poet
- Rosa Maria Assing, née Varnhagen (1783–1840), German writer
  - Ottilie Assing (1819–1884), German writer
  - Ludmilla Assing (1821–1880), German writer
- Helmut Assing (born 1932), German historian and logician

Given name:

- Assing "Aki" Aleong
