= Hep-Hep riots =

1819 anti-Jewish riots in Germany

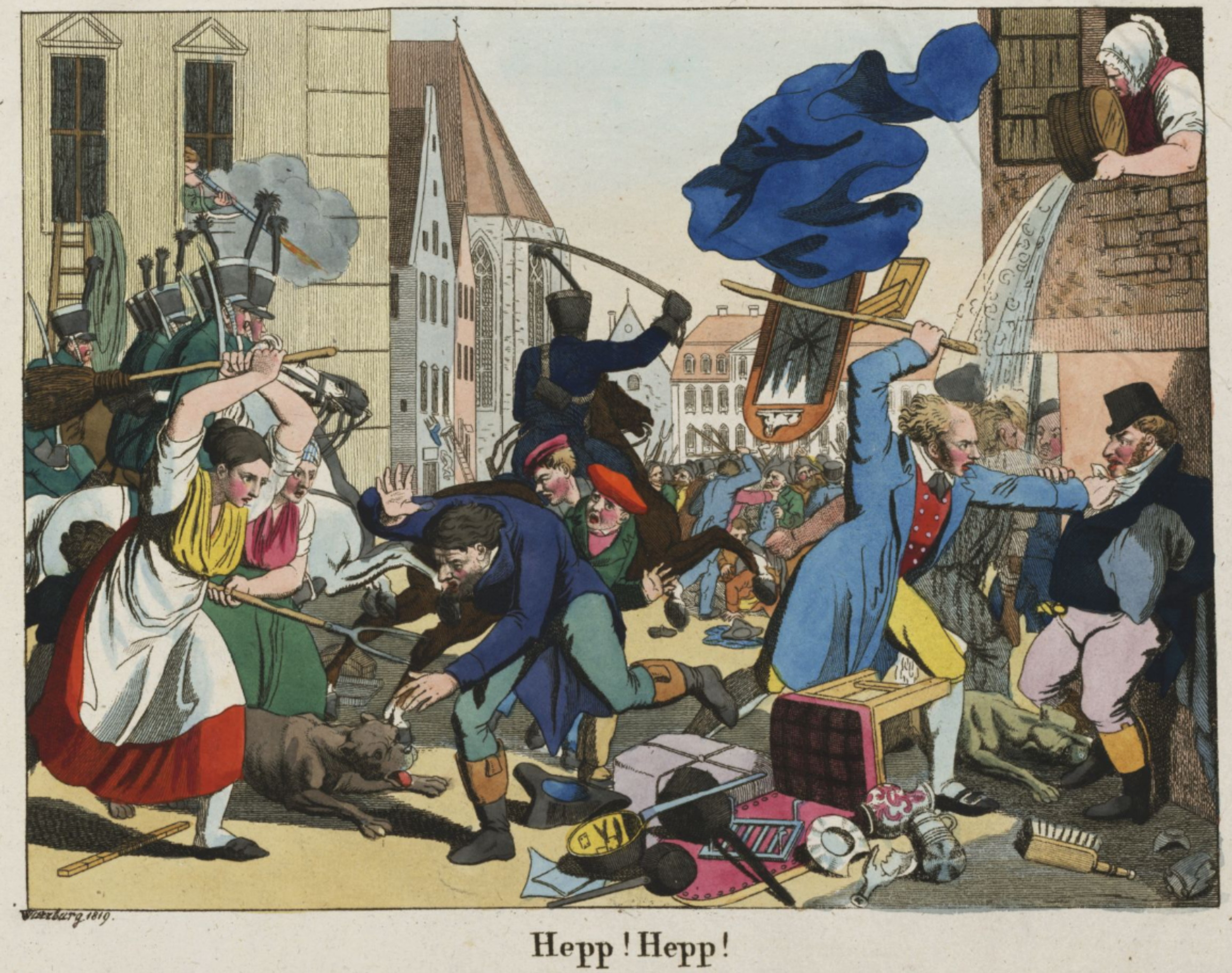
1819 riots in Würzburg, from a contemporary engraving by Johann Michael Voltz. On the left, two peasant women are assaulting a Jew with pitchfork and broom. On the right, a man wearing tails and a waistcoat, "perhaps a pharmacist or a schoolteacher," holds a Jew by the throat and is about to club him with a truncheon. The houses are being looted.

The Hep-Hep riots from August to October 1819 were riots against Jews, beginning in the Kingdom of Bavaria, during the period of Jewish emancipation in the German Confederation. The antisemitic communal violence began on August 2, 1819, in Würzburg and soon reached the outer regions of the German Confederation. Many Jews were injured and much Jewish property was destroyed, although no deaths were reported.

== Historical background ==
The devastating riots or pogroms took place during a period of heightened political and social tension, shortly following the end of the Napoleonic Wars in 1815 and the great famine of 1816-17, and on the eve of the repressive Carlsbad Decrees. In many German cities, emancipation of the Jews had only begun in recent years, after centuries of living in the countries of Central Europe as non-citizens with restricted rights. The status of Jews varied throughout the 36 independent German states and free cities; some had revoked the recent Napoleonic era emancipation edicts, others maintained them officially but ignored them in practice. In most German territories, Jews were excluded from posts in public administration and the army and forbidden to hold teaching positions in schools and universities.

Jewish representatives formally demanded emancipation at the Congress of Vienna (1815), and German academics and politicians alike responded with vicious opposition. The Jews were portrayed to the public as "upstarts" who were attempting to take control of the economy, particularly the financial sector. Antisemitic publications became common in the German press. Influenced by the Haskalah, as well as the French Revolution with its Declaration of the Rights of Man and of the Citizen and other advancements in civil rights, many Jews and equal rights activists began to demand citizenship and equal treatment. As Jewish Emancipation progressed, German Jews were becoming competitors for Christian guilds in the economy. Immediately before the riots began, the Bavarian Diet had completed a debate on further emancipation of the Jews throughout the Kingdom. Amos Elon writes in his 2002 book The Pity of It All: A History of the Jews in Germany, 1743–1933:

In some places, attempts were made to return Jews to their old medieval status. The free city of Frankfurt reinstated parts of the medieval statute that restricted the rights of Jews. As of 1816 only twelve Jewish couples were allowed to marry each year. The 400,000 gulden the community had paid the city government in 1811 in return for its emancipation were declared forfeited. In the Rhineland, which had reverted to Prussian control, Jews lost the citizenship rights they had been granted under the French and were no longer allowed to practice certain professions. The few who had been appointed to public office before the war were summarily dismissed.

== Name ==
"Hep-Hep" was the perpetrators' derogatory rallying cry. The most likely explanation is that it was based on the traditional herding cry of German shepherds. Another hypothesis suggests that it is an acronym from the Latin "Hierosolyma est perdita" ("Jerusalem is lost"), said (without verifiable evidence) to have been a rallying cry of the Crusaders. The "acronym theory" was attributed to a single letter published in a British newspaper on 28 August 1819, some weeks after the riots. Cornell's Michael Fontaine disputes this etymology, concluding that the "acrostic interpretation ... has no basis in fact." Ritchie Robertson also disputes the "false etymology" of the acronym interpretation, citing Katz.

== Hostilities ==
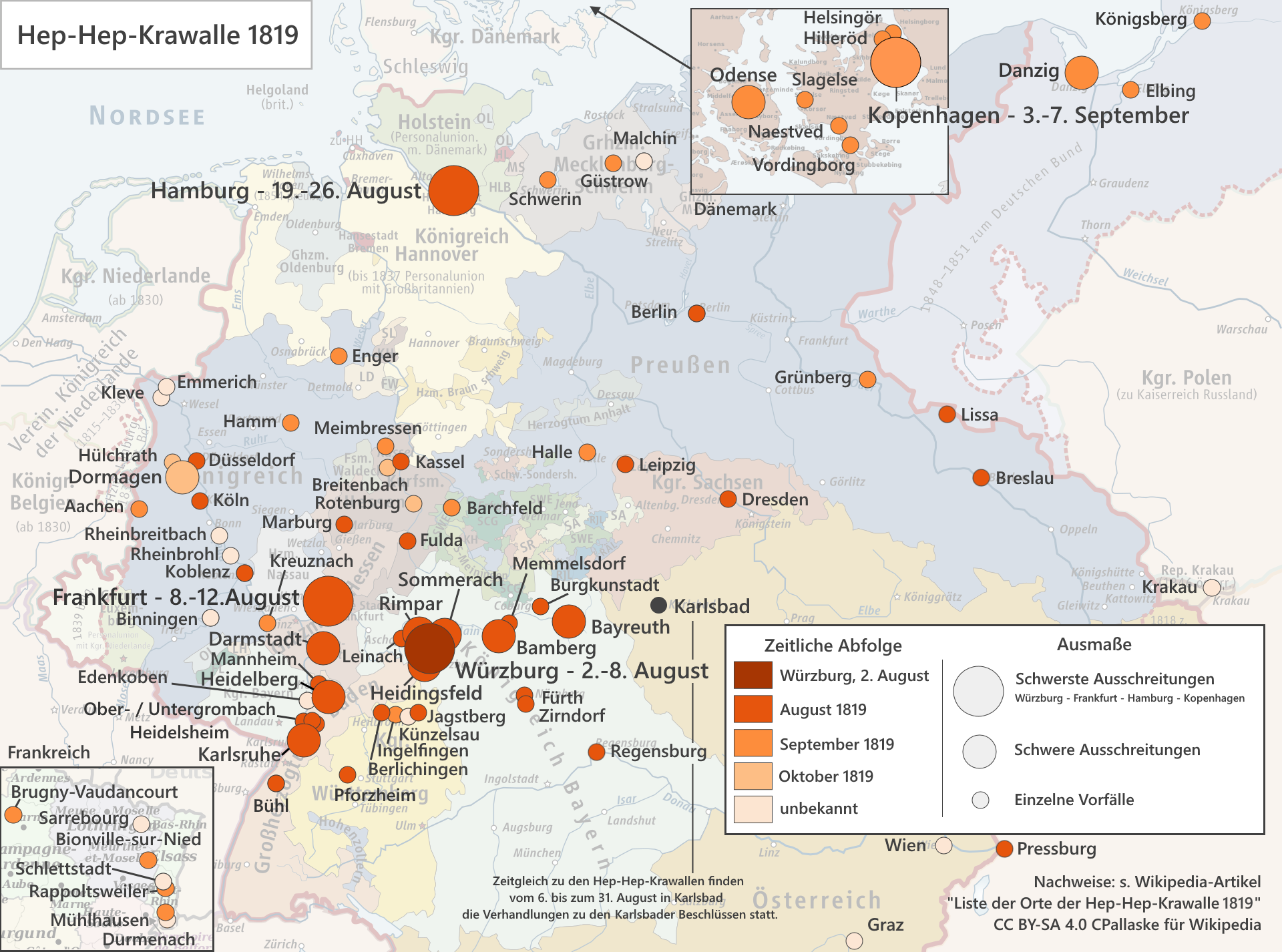
Map of the Hep-Hep-Riots in 1819 (German)

The riots began on 2 August 1819 in Würzburg. After several days troops were called in. The Jewish population fled the city and spent several days in tents in the vicinity.

The riots swept through other Bavarian towns and villages, then spread to Bamberg, Bayreuth, Darmstadt, Karlsruhe, Mannheim, Frankfurt, Koblenz, Cologne and other cities along the Rhine, and as far north as Bremen, Hamburg, and Lübeck.

In some towns, the police appeared too late or stood by idly while the mob raged through the streets. In towns where the militia arrived promptly, the riots were put down relatively quickly. In Heidelberg the police were tardy in their response, but two professors and their students took the law into their hands and prevented a bloody riot. They restrained the culprits and made citizen's arrests. With the exception of Heidelberg, townspeople generally remained passive bystanders.

In several cities, members of the bourgeoisie, students, and even university professors were among the instigators. Ludwig Robert, a Jewish playwright who had recently converted to Christianity, gave an eyewitness account of the rioting:

"... I walked all the way to the Waldhorngasse. There I caught sight of the commandant of the city, General Bruckner, on horseback, and as there was still sporadic shouting, he told his patrol: "Let the bastards shout away if they insist, but the minute they do something dumb, let them have it!" Everyone in town was standing at their open windows, and I went back slowly, close to the buildings, so that I could hear what was being said and assess the mood.

Children were playing in front of the doorsteps, laughing and giggling; they told about the day's events with childish interest. But none of the men or women admonished them or even engaged them in serious conversation. And there was even less chance of seeing a priest, even though in my opinion this was truly where they ought to have been, as teachers of the religion that holds love in such esteem."

"How corrupt people really are and how inadequate their sense of law and justice not to mention their love of humanity – is clear from the fact that there was no indignation expressed at these incidents, not even in the official papers .... The townspeople are said to have been angry with Bruckner for closing the taverns right away. They threatened to tear him off his horse."

After three days of riots in Karlsruhe, the infantry was called in and cannons were deployed in the streets. Ludwig, the Grand Duke of Baden, demonstrated his solidarity with the Jews of his capital by taking up residence at the home of a prominent Karlsruhe Jew. After this, calm was restored.

== Effects and reactions ==
The riots intensified already existing tensions between Christians and Jews in Germany, as well as internal discord and self-analysis within the German-Jewish community.

Many proponents of emancipation believed that to be treated as equal, German Jews had to become fully "German", and attempts to assimilate and integrate into secular German society increased among German Jews in the aftermath of the hostilities.

Another direction was offered by the movement Wissenschaft des Judentums. Groups such as Verein für Cultur und Wissenschaft der Juden (Association for Culture and Science of the Jews) attempted to place secular Jewish culture on par with Western European culture. Founded around 1819 by Eduard Gans, Heinrich Heine, Leopold Zunz and Michael Beer, it was an attempt to provide a construct for the Jews as a people in their own right, and sought to validate their secular cultural traditions as being on an equal footing with those of the German people.

On Jewish reaction, Elon writes:

Jewish reactions to the riots were remarkably restrained. Many Jews were either too cowed or too trusting in the rule of law and order. The detachedness and lack of personal identification with the victims on the part of the Jewish upper middle class is an indication that the rich and the largely converted intellectual Jewish elite were turning their backs on the poor and petite bourgeoisie. The Jewish family magazine Sulamith did not mention the riots at all.

Rahel Varnhagen, another Jewish convert to Christianity, wrote to her brother:

"I am infinitely sad on account of the Jews, in a way I have never experienced before.... What should this mass of people do, driven out of their homes? They want to keep them only to despise and torture them further."

"I know my country. Unfortunately. For the past three years I've said the Jews will be attacked. I have witnesses. The Germans wax bold with indignation, and why? Because they are the most civilized, peace-loving, and obedient people.... Their newfound hypocritical love for Christianity (may God forgive my sin) and the Middle Ages, with its poetry, art, and atrocities, incites the people to commit the only atrocity they may still be provoked to: attacking the Jews!... Their hate does not stem from religious zeal: how can they hate other faiths when they don't even love their own?

=== Carlsbad Decrees ===
During the ongoing riots the Carlsbad Decrees were passed. Within a month afterwards, the Hep-Hep riots ended.

== See also ==
- Gordon Riots
- Judenjagd
