= Varnhagen =

Former noble family

The Varnhagen family was a German noble family from Westphalia. Its most notable members were Rosa Maria Varnhagen, Francisco Adolfo de Varnhagen, Viscount of Porto Seguro, Karl August Varnhagen von Ense and (by marriage to Karl) Rahel Varnhagen.
