= Fanny Tarnow =

German author and playwright (1779–1862)

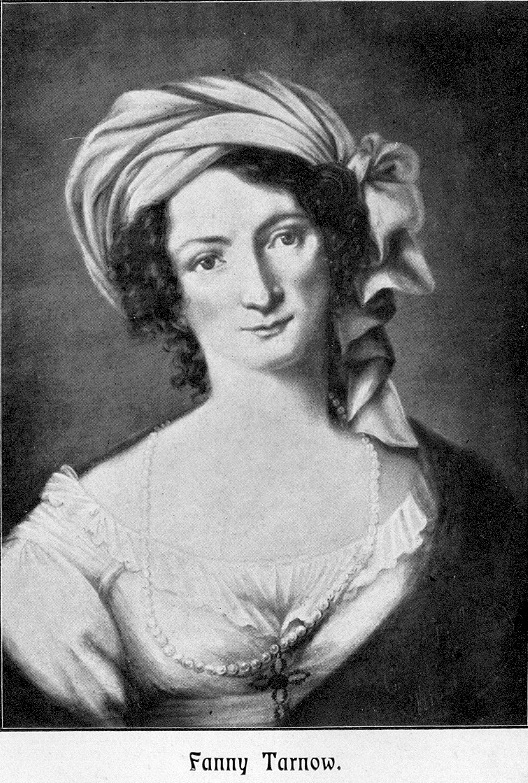
- Sketch portrait of Fanny Tarnow
- Born: 17 December 1779
- Died: 4 July 1862 (aged 82)
- Occupation: Writer
- Writing career
- Pen name: F.T.
- Language: German
- Period: 1805 – 1841

Franziska Christiane Johanna Friederike "Fanny" Tarnow (17 December 1779, Güstrow – 4 July 1862, Dessau) was a German writer. She wrote under the names Fanny Tarnow and F. T.

== Family background ==
Fanny Tarnow was the first child of the lawyer and secretary of state in Güstrow David Tarnow, later a Gutsbesitzer or landholder, and his wife, Amalie Justine Holstein. She grew up in wealthy circles, but was unable to walk well after a terrible fall when she was just four years old. The majority of her childhood was spent at her family home and that of her aunt Wilhelmine von le Fort (1771–1841). After her father lost his property, the family moved to Neu-Buckow and Fanny became a governess, first at Rügen for four years then at Rohlstorff.

== Writing career ==
In 1805 she began publishing her journals anonymously and made contact with cultural figures including Johann Friedrich Rochlitz, Julius Eduard Hitzig, Friedrich de la Motte Fouqué, Rosa Maria Assing, Rahel and Karl August Varnhagen von Ense. From 1807 to 1812, she was a governess in Wismar and Rankendorf, then until 1815 she went to nurse her ill mother in Neu-Buckow.

From 1816 to 1818, she lived with a childhood friend in Saint Petersburg, where she met Friedrich Maximilian Klinger, August von Kotzebue and Count Jacob Johann Sievers. This was followed by temporary stays in Berlin and at her sister's house in Lübeck. Fanny and the writer Amalie Schoppe also headed a girls' reformatory in Hamburg. In 1820 Fanny moved to Schandau - during this time she befriended Helmina von Chezy, Elisa von der Recke, Ludwig Tieck, Christoph August Tiedge and countess Egloffstein. She then temporarily lost her sight due to illness and so in 1829 she moved to stay in Weißenfels with her sister Betty.

Worried friends then selected some of her writings and published then on a subscription basis, raising 5,000 Taler for her. After that she mainly worked translating French and English works into German. From 1841 she lived in Dessau. Tarnow hosted literary salons that attracted writers, intellectuals, and other people of note

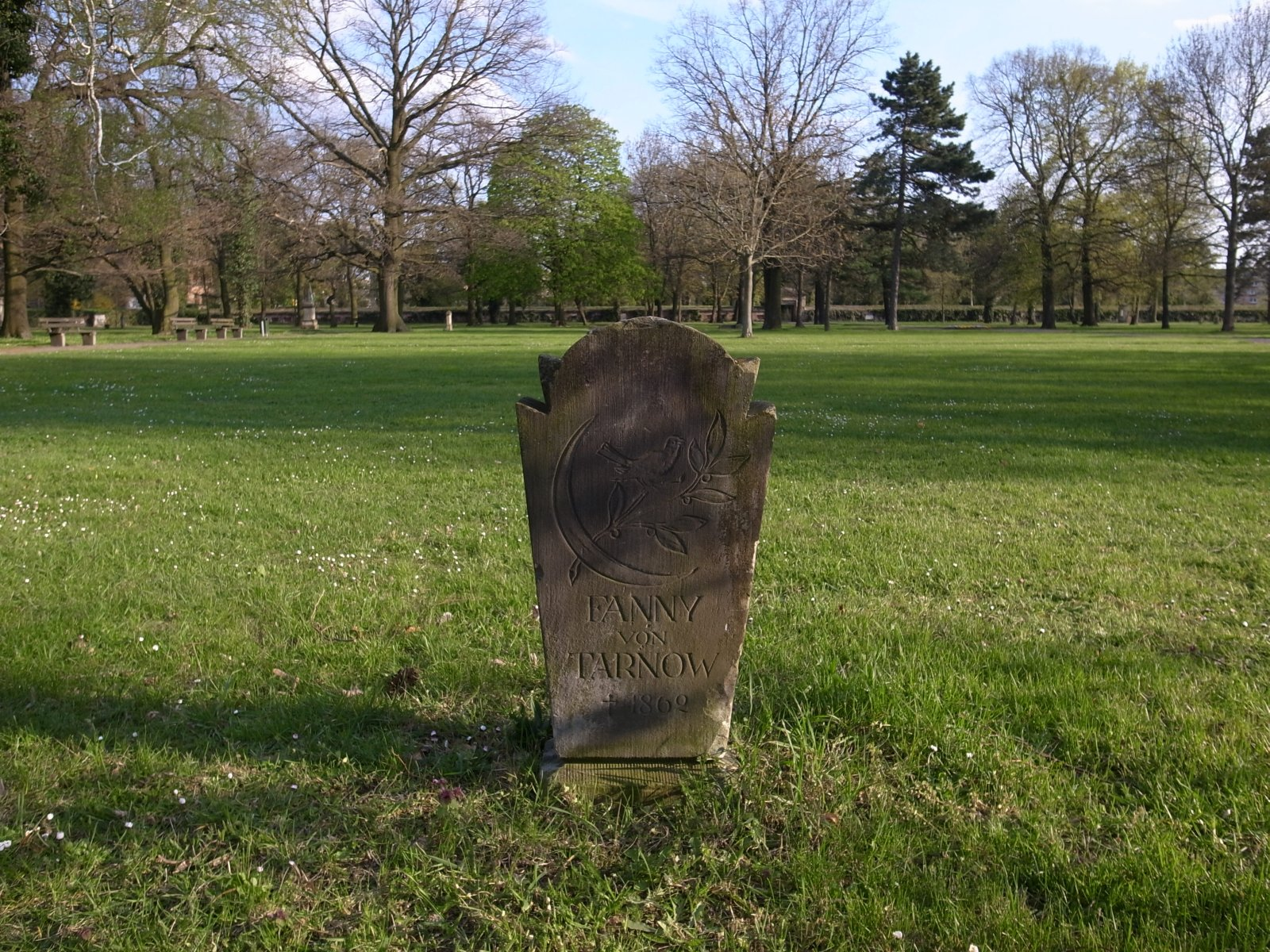
Gravestone of Fanny von Tarnow, (Neuer Begräbnisplatz in Dessau)

== Works ==
- (anonymous:) Alwine von Rosen, in: Journal für deutsche Frauen, 1805 und 1806
- Thekla
- Natalie. Ein Beitrag zur Geschichte des weiblichen Herzens, 1812
- Thorilde von Adlerstein, oder Frauenherz und Frauenglück. Eine Erzählung aus der großen Welt, 1816
- Mädchenherz und Mädchenglück. Erzählungen für Gebildete, 1817
- Kleine Erzählungen, 1817
- Briefe auf einer Reise nach Petersburg, an Freunde geschrieben, 1819
- Lilien. Erzählungen, 4 Bde. 1821/25
- Sidoniens Witwenjahre, nach dem Französischen frei bearbeitet, 2 Tle., 1822
- Lebensbilder, 2 Bde., 1824
- Die Spanier auf Fühnen. Historisches Schauspiel, 1827
- Ausgewählte Schriften, 15 Bde., 1830
- Zwei Jahre in Petersburg. Aus den Papieren eines alten Diplomaten, 1833
- Erzählungen und Novellen, fremde und eigene, 2 Tle., 1833
- Reseda, 1837
- Spiegelbilder, 1837
- Galerie weiblicher Nationalbilder, 2 Tle., 1838
- Gesammelte Erzählungen, 4 Bde., 1840–42
- Heinrich von England und seine Söhne. Eine alte Sage neu erzählt, 2 Tle., 1842

== Bibliography ==
- (in German) Monika Stranáková: "Es ist hier vieles ganz anders, als man bei uns glaubt…" Fanny Tarnows Reise nach St. Petersburg. In: Christina Ujma: Wege in die Moderne. Reiseliteratur von Schriftstellerinnen und Schriftstellern des Vormärz. Bielefeld, 2009. ISBN 978-3-89528-728-2. S. 229-242.
- (in German) Birgit Wägenbaur: Die Pathologie der Liebe. Literarische Weiblichkeitsentwürfe um 1800. Erich Schmidt, Berlin 1996 (Geschlechterdifferenz & Literatur. Band. 4). ISBN 3-503-03732-2.
- (in German) Amely Bölte: Fanny Tarnow. Ein Lebensbild. 1865 (Digitalisat)
