= Rahel Varnhagen =

German writer and salonnière (1771–1833)

Rahel Varnhagen von Ense
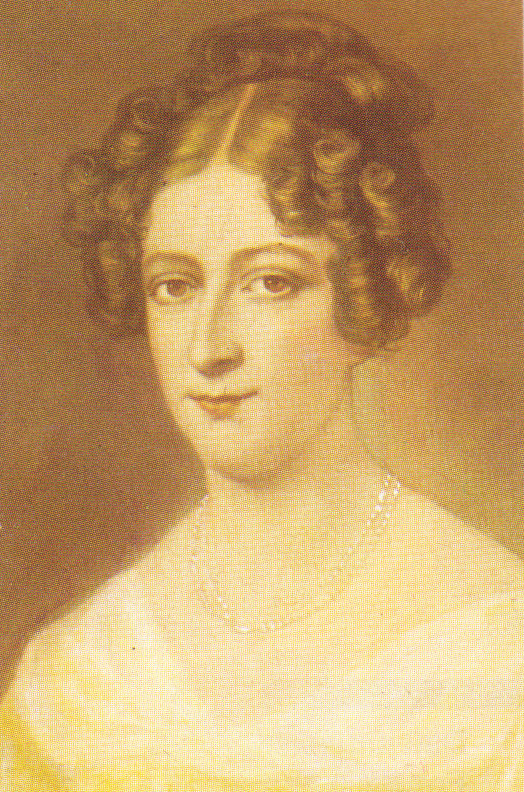
- Pastel by Moritz Michael Daffinger 1818
- Born: 17 May 1771; Berlin, Kingdom of Prussia
- Died: 7 March 1833 (aged 61); Berlin, Kingdom of Prussia
- Resting place: Holy Trinity Church, Berlin
- Spouse: Karl August Varnhagen von Ense
- Writing career
- Language: German
- Period: Age of Enlightenment

Rahel Antonie Friederike Varnhagen von Ense (German: [ˈʁaːɛl ˈfaʁnhaːɡən]) née Levin, later Robert; (19 May 1771 – 7 March 1833) was a German writer who hosted one of the most prominent salons in Europe during the late-18th and early-19th centuries.

She is the subject of a celebrated biography, Rahel Varnhagen: The Life of a Jewess (1957), by Hannah Arendt. Arendt cherished Varnhagen as her "closest friend, though she ha[d] been dead for some hundred years". The asteroid 100029 Varnhagen is named in her honour.

== Life and works ==
Rahel Levin was born to a wealthy Jewish family in Berlin as the eldest daughter of merchant-banker Levin Markus (Löb Cohen, 1723–1790) and Chaie Levin Markus (d. 1809). Rahel had four siblings: Marcus Robert-Tornow (born Mordechai Levin, 1772–1826), a banker; Ludwig Robert (born Louis Liepmann Levin, 1778–1846), a writer; Rose Asser (née Levin, 1781–1853) and Moritz Robert-Tornow (born Meier Levin, 1785–1846), a merchant. Her home life was uncongenial, her father, a wealthy jeweler, being a strong-willed man and ruling his family despotically.

Portrait of Rahel Varnhagen. Pencil drawing by Wilhelm Hensel, 1822.

She became close friends with Dorothea and Henriette, daughters of the philosopher Moses Mendelssohn. Through them she got to know Henriette Herz, with whom she would become intimately associated throughout her life, moving in the same intellectual spheres. Together with Herz and her cousin, Sara Grotthuis née Meyer, she hosted one of the famous Berlin salons of the 1800s. Her home became the meeting place for artists, poets and intellectuals such as Schlegel, Schelling, Steffens, Schack, Schleiermacher, Alexander and Wilhelm von Humboldt, Motte Fouqué, Karl Gustaf von Brinckmann, Ludwig Tieck, Jean Paul, and Friedrich Gentz. During a visit to Carlsbad in 1795 she was introduced to Goethe, whom she met again in Frankfurt am Main in 1815.

Rahel was revered for her witty conversation and wise judgments, and was passionate about literature as well as the new sciences. Since she was not allowed to study as a woman, she educated herself by reading the most important classical and contemporary literature, often in the original language.

It was the time of the romantic cult of friendship. Rahel lived intensely, knew the highs of enthusiasm and the lows of despair. She went out of her way for her friends, giving advice and helping when it came to secret love affairs or illegitimate children. An ardent lover herself, she experienced two passionate love affairs: the first with Count Karl von Finckenstein, the second with the Spanish diplomat Don Rafael Eugenio de Urquijo. Both relationships were broken off after lengthy engagements.

As an independent woman her view of marriage was highly critical, nevertheless she hoped to escape the “disgrace” and “misfortune” of her Jewish birth through marriage.

After 1806, she lived in Paris, Frankfurt am Main, Hamburg, Prague, and Dresden. This period was one of misfortune for Germany; Prussia was reduced to a small kingdom and its king was in exile. Secret societies were formed in every part of the country with the object of throwing off the tyranny of Napoleon. Levin herself belonged to one of these societies.

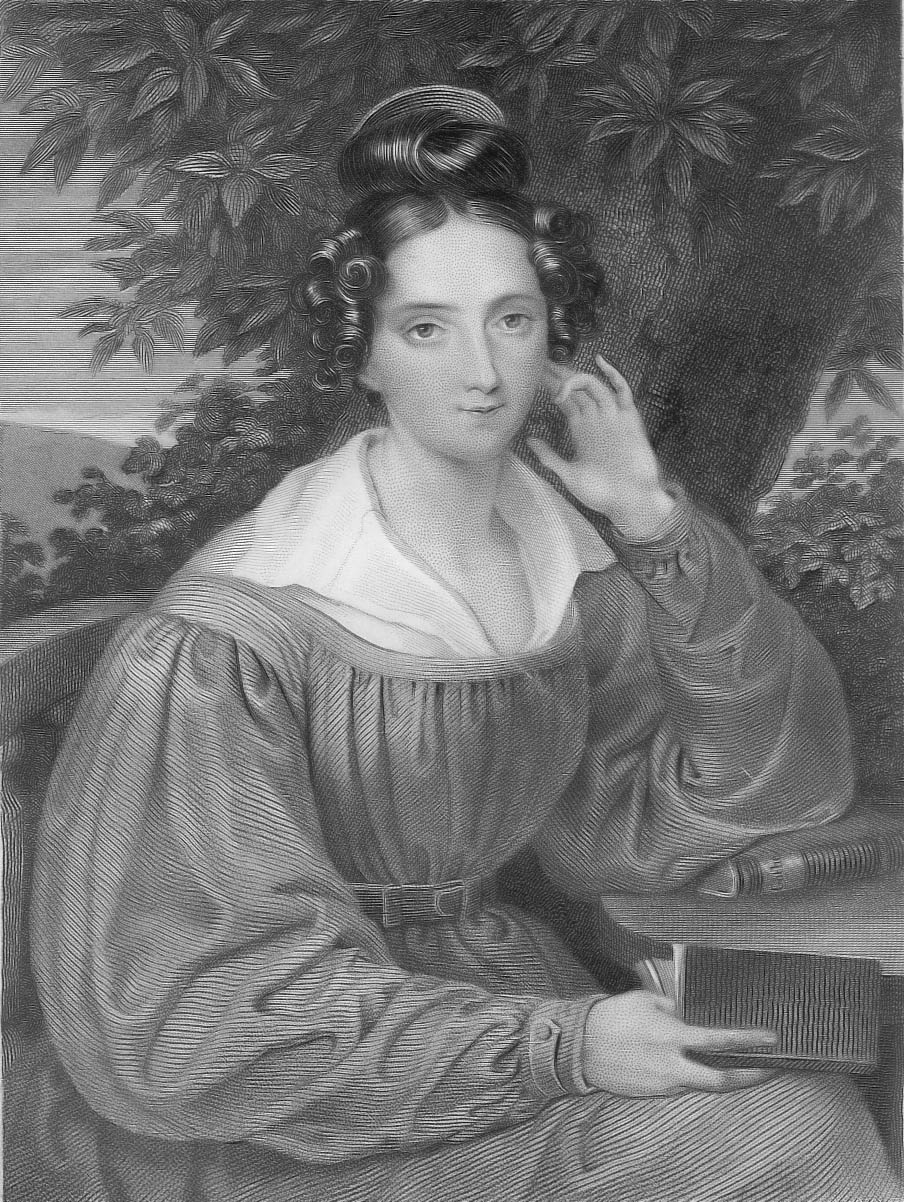
Rahel Varnhagen, by an unknown artist

In 1814, at the age of 43, she married the biographer Karl August Varnhagen von Ense, 14 years of her junior, in Berlin, after having converted to Christianity — this also made her sister-in-law to the poet Rosa Maria Assing. After her conversion to Protestantism, she took the name Antonie Friederike.

At the time of their marriage, her husband, who had fought in the Austrian army against the French, belonged to the Prussian diplomatic corps, and their house in Vienna became a meeting place for Prussian delegates to the Congress of Vienna. In 1815, she accompanied her husband to Vienna and then to Karlsruhe in 1816, where he became a Prussian representative. Early years were difficult in Vienna, Frankfurt and in Karlsruhe, where Karl Varnhagen was a Prussian diplomat at the court of Baden and she, as a baptized Jew, was not invited to court events. She returned to Berlin in 1819, when her husband retired from his diplomatic position.

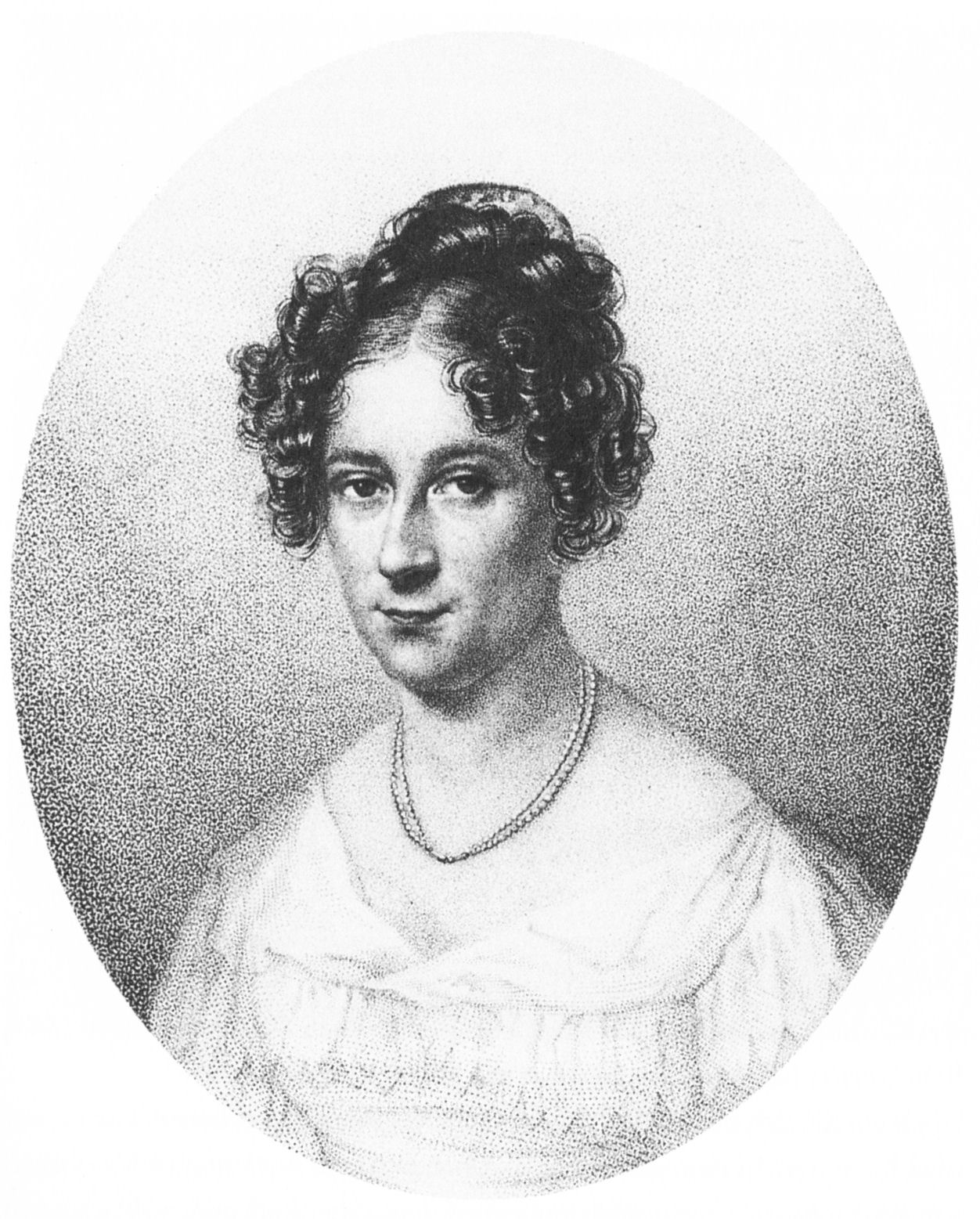
Rahel Varnhagen von Ense, engraving after Moritz Michael Daffinger c. 1817

Her husband learned to give her the freedom she needed. Together they ran a salon but since these were the times of restoration after the Congress of Vienna and Rahel was now a married woman, it was rather more conventional than her first salon. Many of the Romantics had turned away from Rahel after embracing conservatism and Germanism. Hegel, Ranke and Börne and other progressive political thinkers socialized with them. Rahel herself was enthusiastic about Saint Simon's early socialist writings and found an intellectual heir in the young Heinrich Heine, whose genius she recognized. Bettina von Arnim also became an important friend at that time.

Though she never wrote a major book, Rahel Varnhagen is remembered for the intensity and variety of her correspondence. Six thousand letters have survived, out of an estimated ten thousand she wrote in her lifetime. A few of her essays were published in Das Morgenblatt, Das Schweizerische Museum, and Der Gesellschafter; in 1830, her Denkblätter einer Berlinerin was published in Berlin. Her husband, Karl August, edited and published her correspondence in the 20 years after her death. Her correspondence with David Veit and with Karl August was published in Leipzig, in 1861 and 1874–1875, respectively.

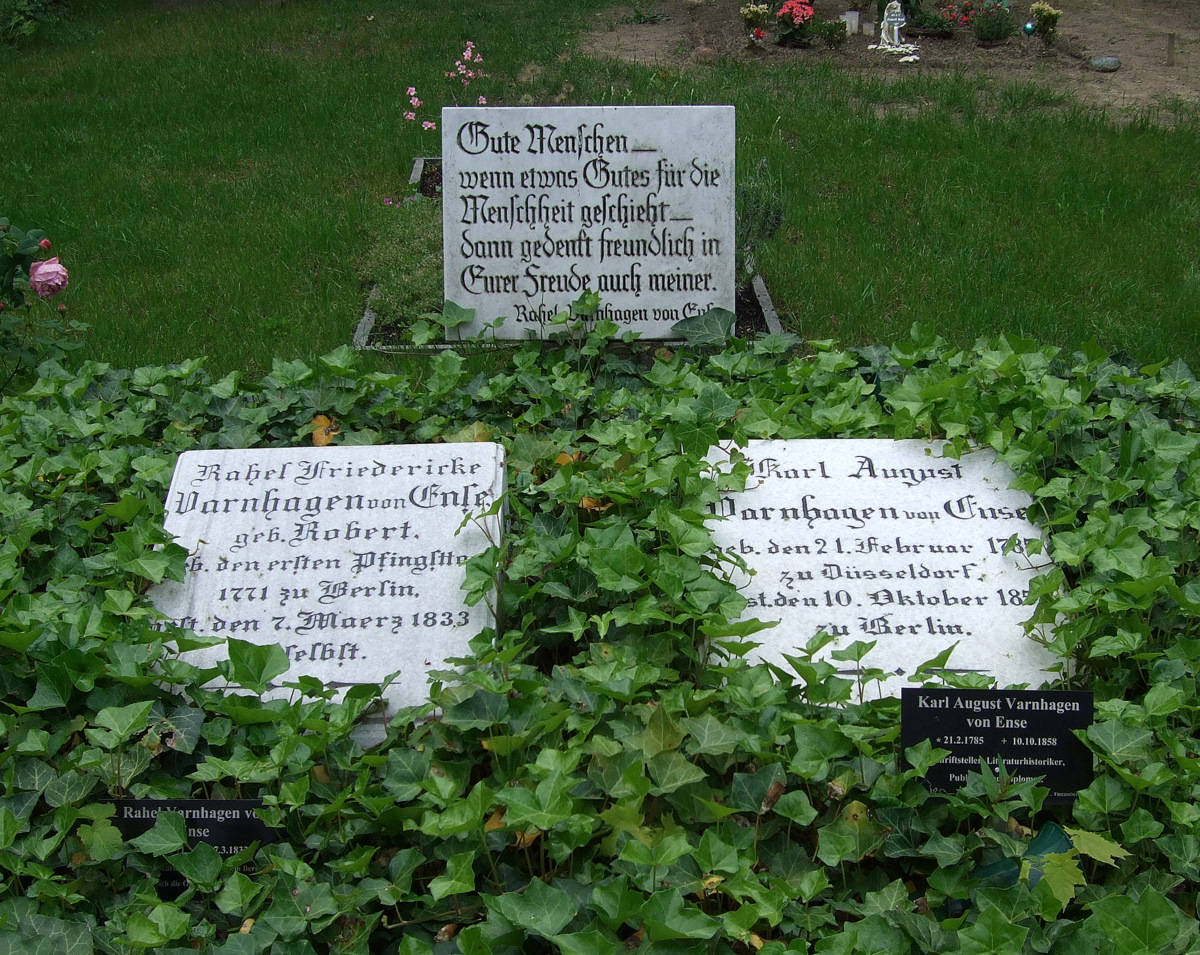
The grave of Rahel Varnhagen in Berlin

Rahel Varnhagen died in Berlin in 1833. Her grave is in the Dreifaltigkeitsfriedhof I Berlin-Kreuzberg. Her husband published two memorial volumes containing selections from her work: Rahel, ein Buch des Andenkens für ihre Freunde (Rahel, a Memorial Book for her Friends; 3 vols., 1834; new ed., 1903) and Galerie von Bildnissen aus Rahels Umgang (Gallery of Portraits from Rahel's Circle; 2 vols., 1836).

== Relations with Judaism ==
According to the Jewish Encyclopedia (1906), "Rahel always showed the greatest interest in her former co-religionists, endeavouring by word and deed to better their position, especially during the anti-Semitic outburst in Germany in 1819. On the day of her funeral Varnhagen sent a considerable sum of money to the Jewish poor of Berlin."

Amos Elon wrote about Rahel Varnhagen in his 2002 book The Pity of It All: A History of the Jews in Germany, 1743-1933:

She hated her Jewish background and was convinced it had poisoned her life. For much of her adult life she was what would later be called self-hating. Her overriding desire was to free herself from the shackles of her birth; since, as she thought, she had been "pushed out of the world" by her origins, she was determined to escape them. She never really succeeded. In 1810, she changed her family name to Robert, and in 1814, after her mother died, she converted. But her origins continued to haunt her even on her deathbed. She considered her origins "a curse, a slow bleeding to death". The idea that as a Jew she was always required to be exceptional — and go on proving it all the time — was repugnant to her. "How wretched it is always to have to legitimize myself! That is why it is so disgusting to be a Jew."

This has alternatively been understood not as Varnhagen rejecting her Jewish roots, but as resenting the fact they were a barrier to entry into society. Thus, she was forced to prove that, in spite of being Jewish, she was still a valuable German citizen.

Rahel's husband published an account of her deathbed scene, which Amos Elon described as "stylized and possibly overdramatised", including her alleged last words:

What a history! A fugitive from Egypt and Palestine, here I am and find help, love, fostering in you people. With real rapture I think of those origins of mine and this whole nexus of destiny, through which the oldest memories of the human race stand side by side with the latest developments.... The thing which all my life seemed to me the greatest shame, which was the misery and misfortune of my life – having been born a Jewess – this I should on no account now wish to have missed.

The poet Ludwig Robert was her brother and she corresponded extensively with him. Her sister Rosa was married to David Assur Assing. Ludmilla Assing and Ottilie Assing were her nieces-in-law.
