= Sara Grotthuis =

German salon hostess and arts patron (1763–1828)

- Born: Sara Meyer; 1763; Berlin
- Died: 11 December 1828; Berlin
- Other names: Sophie Leopoldine Wilhelmine Baroness von Grotthuis; Sara Wulff

Sara Grotthuis, born Sara Meyer, also known as Sophie Leopoldine Wilhelmine Baroness von Grotthuis and as Sara Wulff by her first marriage (1763 – 11 December 1828), was one of the most well-known "salonnières" (salon hostesses and patrons of the arts) of the late 18th and early 19th centuries in Berlin.

== Biography ==
Sara Grotthuis was born Sara Meyer in Berlin in 1763 as the eldest daughter of the Orthodox Jewish banker Aaron Moses Meyer and his wife Rösel. Through her mother, Sara was the great-granddaughter of Veitel Heine Ephraim, who served Friedrich the Great as a "Münzjude" or mint master. She was the cousin of Rahel Varnhagen von Ense.

The well-known Jewish scholar and Enlightenment thinker Moses Mendelssohn, a close friend of the family, was consulted on Sara's education and upbringing. Sara was noted as being bright and talented in languages.

In 1778 at the age of 15, Sara was married to the older Jewish businessman Liebmann Wulff. Her parents were in favor of the marriage, and the ceremony was performed by Moses Mendelssohn. It was an unhappy marriage, one that distressed the young Sara. After her husband Wulff died in 1787, Sara moved back in with her parents. She converted to Christianity in 1788. She may have converted back to Judaism for a time, but she was a converted Protestant Christian by the time of her second marriage.

In 1797, she married the Livonian Baron Ferdinand Dietrich von Grotthuis, a land owner and officer in the Prussian army. The couple lived in Berlin, and Sara led one of the most important literary salons of the time and exchanged letters with Goethe.

After the Prussian army's 1806 loss to Napoleon, the Grotthuis couple lost all of their property and fell into poverty. They lived in Oranienburg, where Baron Grotthuis took on a position as a postman. Sara Grotthuis died in Berlin on 11 December 1828.

== Literary Salon ==
Alongside other salonnières Henriette Herz and Rahel Varnhagen, Sara Grotthuis led one of the most influential literary salons in Berlin around 1800. Her guests included not only diplomats, writers, and actors but also members of the Prussian nobility like Prince Louis Ferdinand.

Her salon gained influence through her friendship with Johann Wolfgang Goethe, of whom she was a long-time admirer. As a thirteen-year-old, Sara would steal away from family in the evenings to read Goethe's The Sorrows of Young Werther, which a young love interest had sent to her. Moses Mendelssohn, a close friend of the Meyer family, disapproved of Werther and considered Goethe a bad influence on youth. He threw Sara's copy of Werther out a window. Gotthold Ephraim Lessing, another friend of the family and an admirer of Goethe, gave her another copy. She met Goethe in 1795 at a spa in Karlsbad, far before any of the other Berlin salonnières. Their friendship thus also predated the Goethe-cult created by the brothers August Wilhelm Schlegel and Friedrich Schlegel.

She maintained correspondence with Goethe for years. Goethe sent her unpublished manuscripts to be read in her salon, and sometimes he sent actors to read them, such as the famous actor couple Amalie Wolff-Malcolmi and Pius Alexander Wolff. Grotthuis for her part connected Goethe with certain important figures including Prince Karl Joseph von Ligne, among others.

In addition to Goethe, Grotthuis counted Lessing, Herder, and Prince Karl Joseph von Ligne among her friends. Rahel Varnhagen's husband Karl August Varnhagen von Ense wrote of Sara Grotthuis: "She was flattered by Lessing in her youth and later by Herder, and then she became friends with Frau von Genlis, the Prince of Ligne and Goethe."

Sara Grotthuis' salon ended – like the first salon of her cousin Rahel von Varnhagen – with the Prussian defeat in 1806 and the resulting impoverishment of the Grotthuis family.
