= Rahel Varnhagen: The Life of a Jewess =

Hannah Arendt's biography of Rahel Varnhagen

- 1997 edition
- Author: Hannah Arendt
- Subject: Biography
- Published: 1957
- Publisher: East and West Library
- Publication place: United Kingdom
- Pages: 222
- OCLC: 70379360
- LC Class: PT2546 V22 A9413 1957

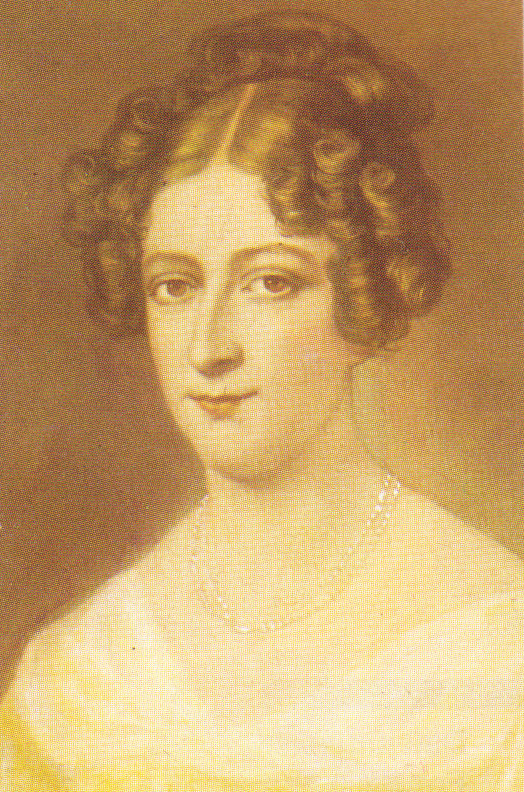
Rahel Varnhagen c. 1800

Rahel Varnhagen: The Life of a Jewess is a biography of Rahel Varnhagen written by political philosopher Hannah Arendt. Originally her Habilitationsschrift she completed it in exile as a refugee, but was not published till 1957, in English, in the UK (London) by East and West Library.

== History ==
Rahel Varnhagen was Arendt's habilitation thesis (Habilitationsschrift), largely written in the 1930s, but which she was unable to complete, having to flee Nazi Germany. She took the manuscript with her into exile in Paris, where she was able to complete it in 1938. Forced to flee once again, this time without her manuscript, she arrived in America in 1941. However, she had given a copy to Gershom Scholem, and it was finally published in 1957 having been translated from German. The book was later translated into French in 1986, and Spanish in 2000. A revised edition in 1974 used the subtitle The Life of a Jewish Woman. A later biography of the subject by Heidi Thomann Tewarson (2001) distanced itself from Arendt's work, which its author considered too critical of Varnhagen. Arendt dedicated the book to her life-long friend Anne Mendelssohn, who had first drawn her attention to Varnhagen's writing.

== Content ==
Rahel Varnhagen is ostensibly a biography of this nineteenth century Jewish socialite, and formed an important step in Arendt's analysis of Jewish history and the subjects of assimilation and emancipation, and introduced her treatment of the Jewish diaspora as either pariah or parvenu. In addition it represents an early version of her concept of history. Arendt's relation to Varnhagen permeates her subsequent work. Her examination of Varnhagen's life is set against the background of the catastrophic destruction of German-Jewish culture and its demonstrations of the illusion of any true German-Jewish "symbiosis" and the threatened existence of her subject. In this sense the book partially reflects Arendt's own view of herself as a German Jewish woman driven out of her own culture into a stateless existence. In this sense the work has been referred to as "biography as autobiography".

== Bibliography ==
- Arendt, Hannah (1997) [1958]. Rahel Varnhagen: The Life of a Jewess. Johns Hopkins University Press. ISBN 978-0-8018-5587-0.
- Aschheim, Steven E. (Winter 2011). "Between New York and Jerusalem". Jewish Review of Books (Review).* Azria, Régine (1987). "Review of Rahel Varnhagen. La vie d'une juive allemande à l'époque du romantisme". Archives de sciences sociales des religions. 32 (64.2): 233. ISSN 0335-5985. JSTOR 30129073.
- Barnouw, Dagmar (Winter 2001). "Rahel Levin Varnhagen: The Life and Work of a German Jewish Intellectual (review)". Shofar: An Interdisciplinary Journal of Jewish Studies. 19 (2): 174–176. ISSN 1534-5165 – via Project MUSE.
- Benhabib, Seyla (1995). "The Pariah and Her Shadow: Hannah Arendt's Biography of Rahel Varnhagen". Political Theory. 23 (1): 5–24. JSTOR 192171.
- Christophersen, Claudia (2002). Es ist mit dem Leben etwas gemeint: Hannah Arendt über Rahel Varnhagen (in German). Königstein/Taunus: U. Helmer. ISBN 978-3-89741-112-8. OCLC 51022474.
- Cutting-Gray, Joanne (1991). "Hannah Arendt's Rahel Varnhagen". Philosophy and Literature. 15 (2): 229–245. doi:10.1353/phl.1991.0023.
- Gerhardt, Christina (2001). "Review of Rahel Varnhagen. The Life of a Jewess". Monatshefte. 93 (3): 389–391. ISSN 0026-9271. JSTOR 30166386.
- Goldstein, Donald J. (Spring 2009). "Hannah Arendt's Shared Destiny with Rahel Varnhagen". Women in Judaism. 6 (1): 18.
- Grunenberg, Antonia [in German] (2003). Arendt (in German). Freiburg: Herder. ISBN 978-3-451-04954-5.
- — (2017). Hannah Arendt and Martin Heidegger: History of a Love. Indiana University Press. ISBN 978-0-253-02718-4.
- Klein, Dennis (1980). "Assimilation and Dissimilation: Peter Gay's Freud, Jews and Other Germans: Masters and Victims in Modernist Culture". New German Critique (19): 151–165. doi:10.2307/487977. ISSN 0094-033X. JSTOR 487977.
- Sebastián, Alicia Poza (2002). "Arendt, Hannah: Rahel Varnhagen, Vida de Una Mujerjudía, Lumen, Barcelona, 2000". Daimon: Revista de Filosofia. 26: 189–190.
- Zohn, Harry (1960). "Review of Rahel Varnhagen. The Life of a Jewess". Jewish Social Studies. 22 (3): 180–181. ISSN 0021-6704. JSTOR 4465809.
- Anonymous (June 2000). "Rahel Varnhagen, de Hannah Arend". El Ciervo (Review) (in Spanish). 49 (591): 43. ISSN 0045-6896. JSTOR 40829511.
- Young-Bruehl, Elisabeth (2004) [1982]. Hannah Arendt: For Love of the World (Second ed.). Yale University Press. ISBN 978-0-300-10588-9. (updated by way of a second preface, pagination unchanged) (Note: 1st ed. Preface ix–xxv; 2nd ed. Preface to Second Edition ix–xxxvi, Preface xxxvii-l)
- Zebadúa Yáñez, Verónica (November 18, 2017). "Reading the Lives of Others: Biography as Political Thought in Hannah Arendt and Simone de Beauvoir". Hypatia. 33 (1): 94–110. doi:10.1111/hypa.12383. ISSN 0887-5367.
