= Johann Michael Voltz =

German painter

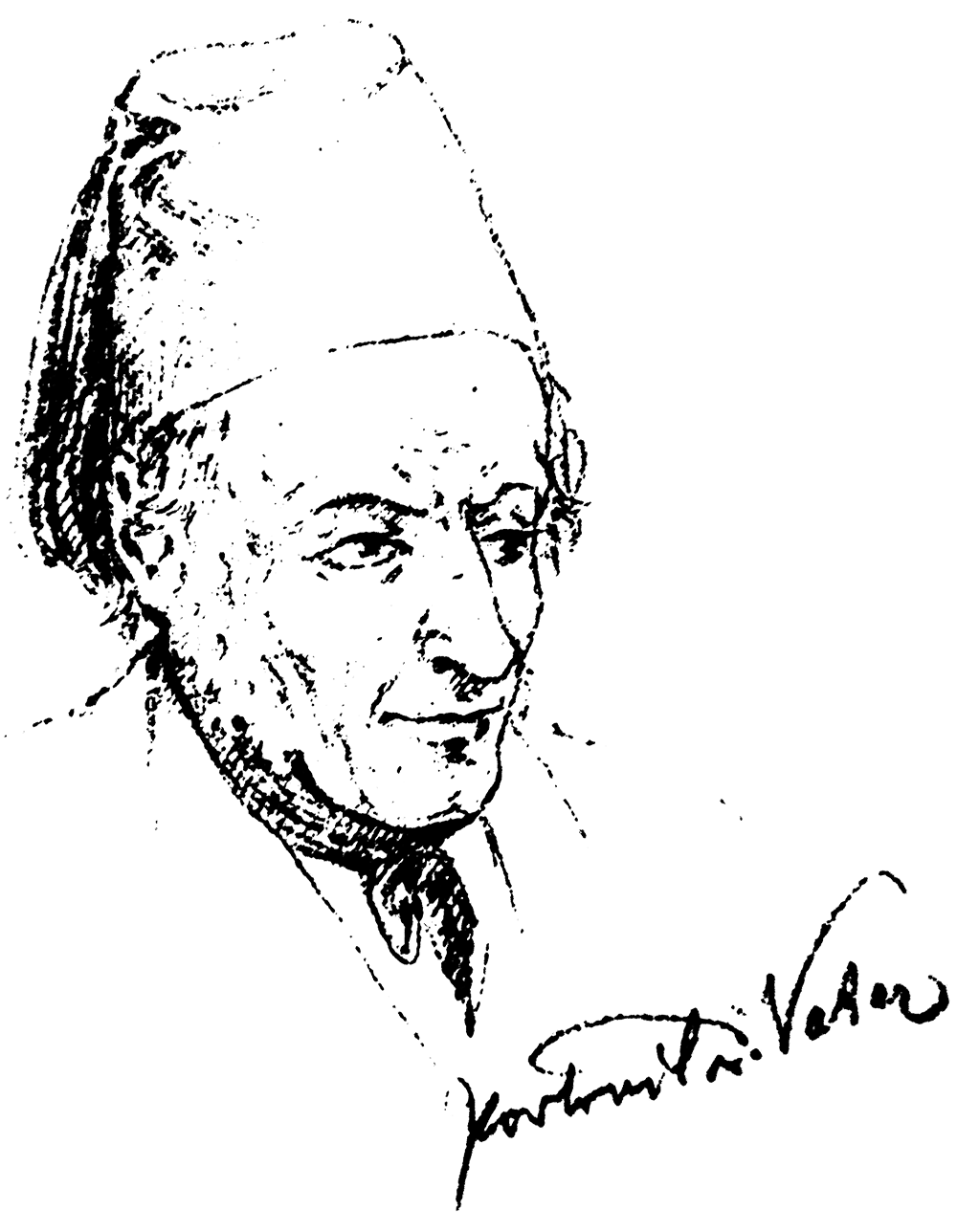
- Born: Johann Michael Voltz; October 16, 1784; Nördlingen
- Died: April 17, 1858 (aged 73); Nördlingen
- Education: Studied with Friedrich Weber (Augsburg)
- Known for: Political cartoons; historical illustrations; etchings
- Style: Illustration, etching, caricature
- Children: Friedrich Voltz; Ludwig Gustav Voltz

Johann Michael Voltz (16 October 1784 – 17 April 1858) was a German painter, graphic artist and political cartoonist.

== Biography ==
He was born in Nördlingen. His father was a schoolteacher. Voltz studied with the engraver and art dealer Friedrich Weber in Augsburg. His drawings and graphic prints brought him to the attention of the court painter.

After completing his education he was employed by Herzberg, an academic bookstore in Augsburg, where he created popular prints. In 1809, after a brief stay in Munich, he joined the firm of picture book publisher Friedrich Campe (1777–1846) in Nuremberg, for which he worked until his death.

In total, his oeuvre includes about 5000 drawings and etchings, which he created for Campe and several other art publishers in Augsburg and Nuremberg, including Von Jenisch- und Stagesche Buchhandlung, Johann Leonhard Schrag and Georg Ebner.

He focused on illustrations of battles and other historical events, such as "Luther at the Diet of Worms", as well as events of his own time – the Napoleonic Wars, the German War of Liberation against Napoleon, and later the Greek War of Independence. In 1828 he made a series of drawings on children's games.

He was also known as a prominent German political cartoonist of the early 19th Century. His cartoons, directed against Napoleon Bonaparte, are still reproduced in present-day history books. His depiction of the 1819 anti-Semitic Hep-Hep riots in Frankfurt is often reproduced in articles and books about anti-Semitism in general.

Voltz died in 1858 in Nördlingen.

He was the father of the animal and landscape painters, Friedrich Voltz, and Ludwig Gustav Voltz.

== Selected works ==
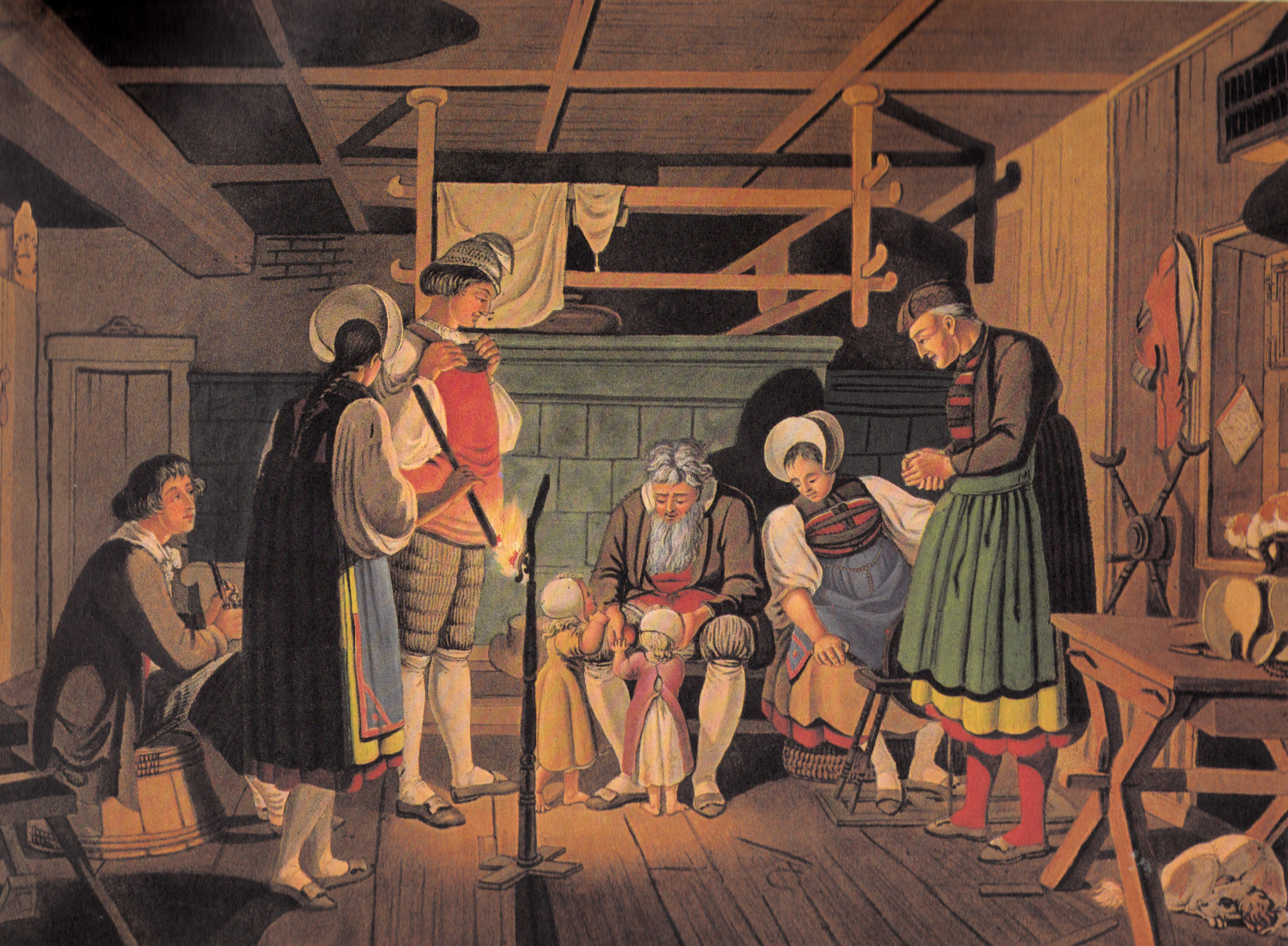
Interior of a home in Hauenstein

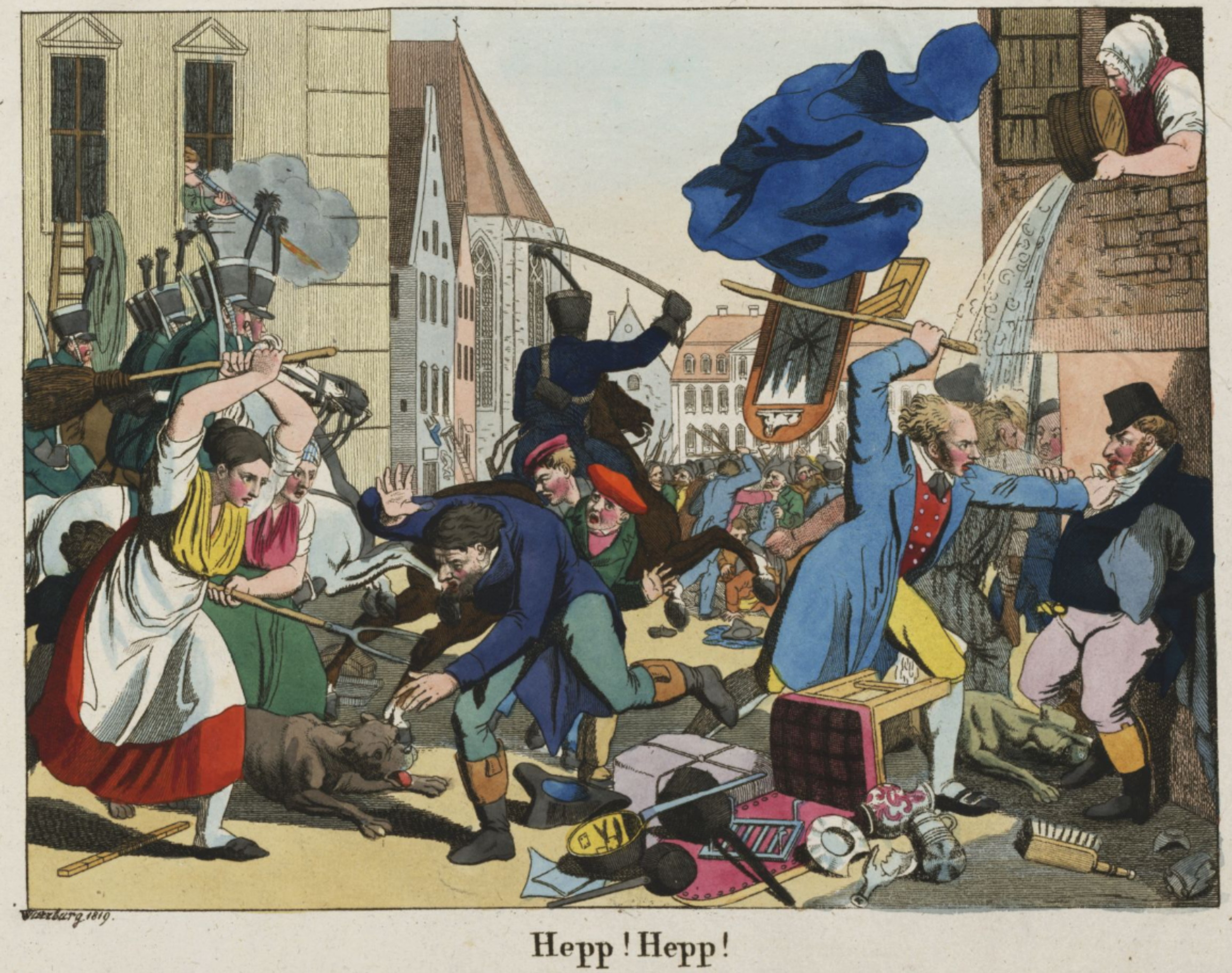
Voltz's depiction of the 1819 anti-Jewish Hep-Hep riots in Würzburg

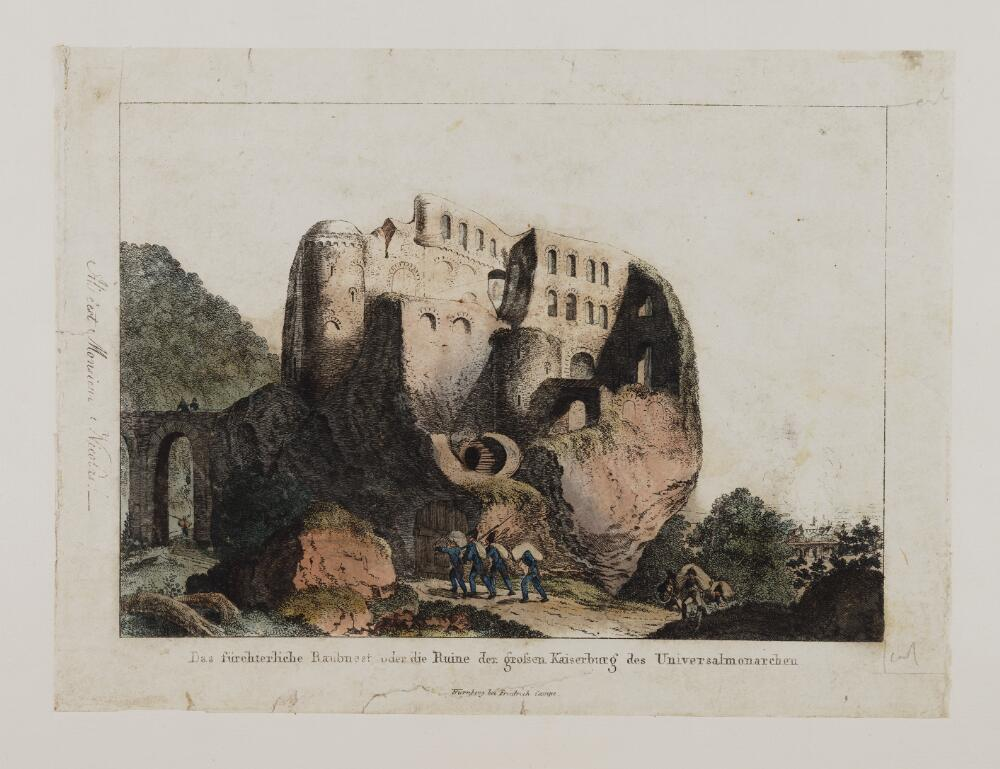
The Predatory Nest

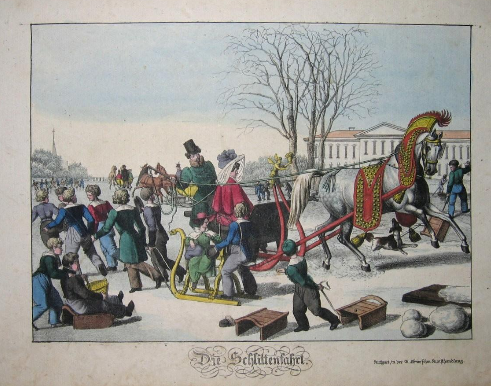
Sleigh Ride
