= Friedrich Voltz =

German painter

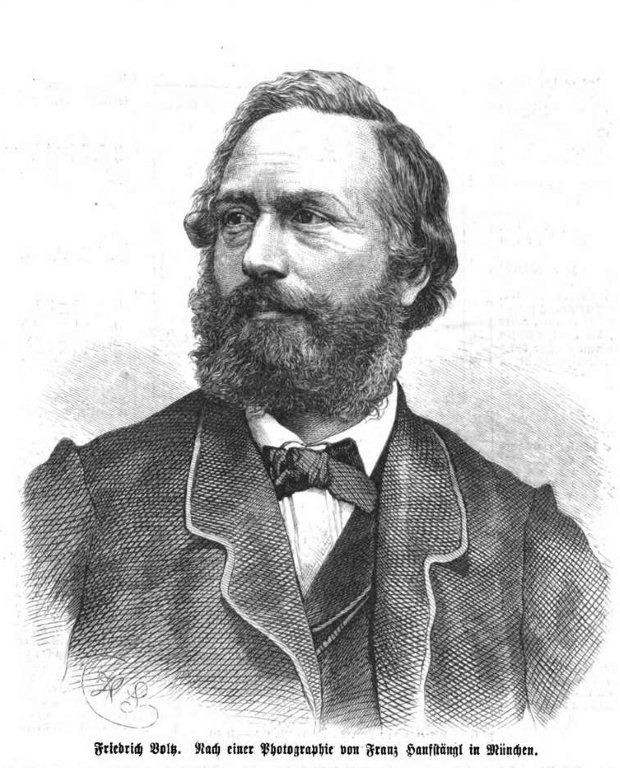
- Drawing by Hermann Scherenberg; after a photograph by Franz Hanfstängl (2018)
- Born: 31 October 1817; Nördlingen
- Died: 25 June 1886 (aged 68); Nice
- Occupations: German landscape and animal painter

Johann Friedrich Voltz (31 October 1817, Nördlingen - 25 June 1886, Munich) was a German landscape and animal painter of the Munich School.

== Life ==
Voltz received his first art instruction from his father, Johann Michael Voltz, a painter and engraver. He began as an etcher and, in 1834, went to Munich to study at the Academy of Fine Arts. However, he derived more inspiration from nature and his studies of the old Dutch Masters at the Alte Pinakothek. He was heavily influenced by Albrecht Adam and his friends, Carl Spitzweg and Eduard Schleich. Sometimes, he would paint the cows in Schleich's landscapes. He found employment as a lithographer but continued to paint Bavarian landscapes through the 1830s.

While visiting the Netherlands in 1841, he saw Der Junge Stier, a painting by Paulus Potter and, from there on, devoted himself primarily to animal painting. During a tour of Belgium and the Netherlands in 1846, he absorbed the style of the Dutch Stimmungsmalern ("mood painters"). He experimented with lighting, producing warm golden colors and cool silvery tones. In his later paintings, the animals are virtually treated as still-lifes, with the dramatic effects created by the play of light.

He died rather unexpectedly when an apparently innocuous foot ailment turned into a serious illness. Voltz is considered one of the great German animal painters along with Anton Braith. His paintings are on display in the Neue Pinakothek and the National Gallery (Berlin), among many others.

His younger brother, Ludwig Gustav, was also an animal painter.

== See also ==
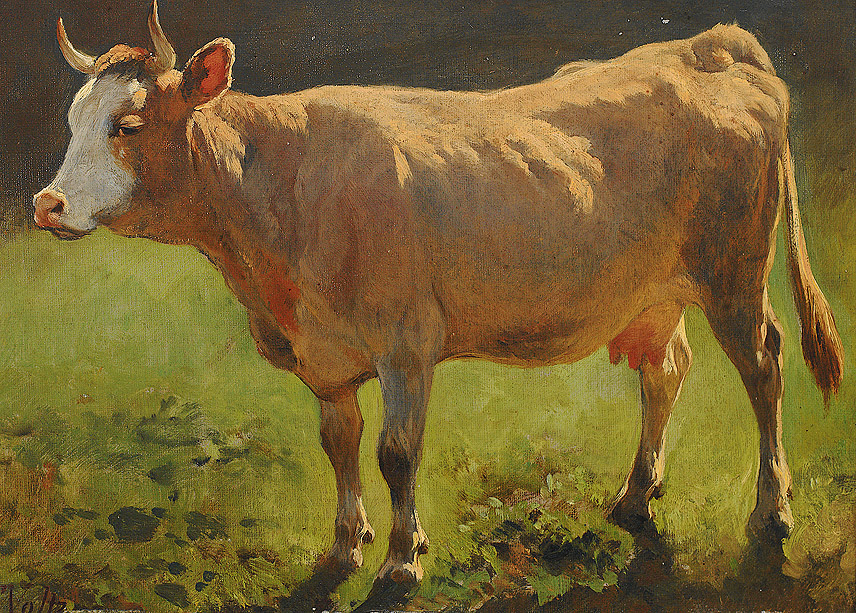
Cow in a Meadow

- List of German painters
