= Ottilie Assing =

German-American freethinker, feminist and abolitionist (1819 – 1884)

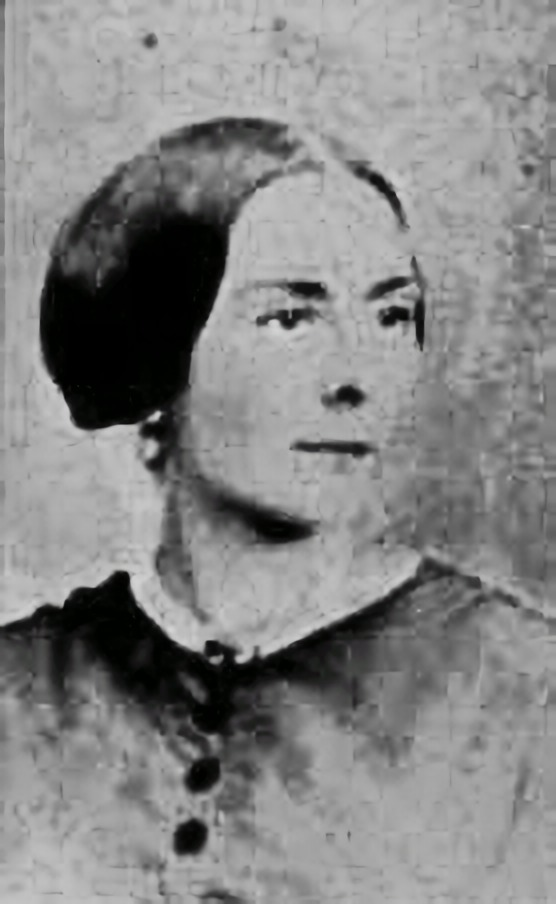
- Born: 11 February 1819; Hamburg, Germany
- Died: 21 August 1884 (aged 65); Paris, France
- Occupations: Feminist, freethinker, abolitionist

Ottilie Davida Assing (11 February 1819 – 21 August 1884) was a German-American feminist, freethinker, and abolitionist, known for her friendship with Frederick Douglass.

== Early life and education ==
Born in Hamburg, she was the eldest daughter of poet Rosa Maria Varnhagen (born 1783), raised as a Lutheran, and David Assur (born 1787), a Jewish physician, who converted to Christianity upon marriage and changed his name to Assing. He became successful in his field. Her mother was friendly with other literary women, including Clara Mundt and Fanny Lewald, and prominent in liberal circles that supported (but failed to achieve) social revolution in 1848. Her aunt Rahel Varnhagen was a noted salon host.

After the deaths of their parents and the Great Fire of Hamburg in 1842, Assing and her sister Ludmilla went to live with their uncle Karl August Varnhagen von Ense, a prominent literary figure and revolutionary activist. His wife Rahel was long dead. Ottilie and Ludmilla soon came to blows in that household, and Ottilie left, never to return.

== Career ==
In 1852, Assing emigrated to the United States, settling in New York City and eventually nearby in Hoboken, New Jersey. She supported herself by writing articles for the Morgenblatt für gebildete Leser and often wrote under a male pseudonym. At first, she wrote general interest pieces about culture, but soon her writing focused on the abolitionist movement. Through the hundreds of articles she wrote, hers became one of the central voices in interpreting abolitionism and the realities of the United States' slave-holding society for European audiences.

Assing read the Narrative of the Life of Frederick Douglass and, impressed, she went to Rochester to interview Douglass in 1856. She suggested that she should translate his work into German. They struck up an immediate friendship. Over the next 28 years, they attended numerous meetings and conventions together. She visited and stayed with his family numerous times, living in their home for months at a time. Assing translated Douglass's works for her German audience, in addition to lining up a publisher for My Bondage and My Freedom (Sklaverei und Freiheit: Autobiografie von Frederick Douglass), distributed by Hoffmann and Campe in Hamburg in 1860.

== Personal life ==
Douglass and Assing are widely believed to have had an intimate relationship, but the surviving correspondence contains no proof for that. She gave him shelter when "he was on the run from conspiracy charges in connection with John Brown's raid on Harpers Ferry", when he was at risk of capture and execution. Drew Gilpin Faust writes that Assing biographer Maria Diedrich "makes a persuasive case that this long friendship was in fact an intimate love affair that Douglass and Assing maintained...."

Her friend Helene von Racowitza said in her memoirs that Assing was deeply in love with Douglass. Eighteen years into their professional collaboration, Assing wrote, "if one stands in so intimate a relationship with a man as I do with Douglass, one comes to know facets of the whole world, of men and women, which would otherwise remain closed, especially if it is a man whom the entire world has seen and whom so many women have loved."

In 1884, having been diagnosed with incurable breast cancer, Assing was in Europe trying to establish her claim to her sister's estate when she learned that Douglass had married Helen Pitts, a younger white woman who worked with him as his secretary in the Recorder's Office. Assing had struggled with depression during much of her life, and her physician was aware that she had suicidal tendencies. In August 1884, Assing killed herself by swallowing cyanide in a public park in Paris. As per her will of November 9, 1871, her correspondence with Douglass was burned. She bequeathed him ongoing income from a $13,000 trust fund. In a codicil, she also bequeathed him her personal album and his choice of books from her library.

== Works ==
- Ottilie Assing: Jean Baptiste Baison. Ein Lebensbild. Verlag Meissner & Schirges, 1851, 126 p (Digitalisat); Reprint by Nabu-Press, 2012. ISBN 978-1272741174, 142 S.
- Sclaverei und Freiheit. Autobiographie (Slavery and Freedom. Autobiography). Assing's translation of Douglass's My Bondage and My Freedom. Hamburg: Hoffmann und Campe, 1860.
- Partly anonymous feature articles and political reports: Telegraph for Germany, Seasons, Morning Journal for educated readers, Süddeutsche Post, Journal of Fine Arts, the German-American Conversations-Lexikon (New York, 1870), as well as periodicals of German social democracy.
- Christoph Lohmann, ed. Radical Passion. Ottilie Assing's Reports from America and Letters to Frederick Douglass. New York: P. Lang, 1999. ISBN 0-8204-4526-6.

== In popular culture ==
Jewell Parker Rhodes, Douglass' Women: A Novel (2003), is a historical novel. It explores his relationships with his wife, Anna Murray Douglass, and Ottilie Assing.

In the 2013 novel The Good Lord Bird by James McBride, the 12-year-old narrator stays in the home of Frederick Douglass and becomes convinced that a woman named “Ottilie” is one of Douglass’s two wives. Lex King portrays Assing in the 2020 miniseries adaptation of the novel, in which she is openly Douglass's lover, even though he is married to Anna.
