= Ludwig Gustav Voltz =

German painter

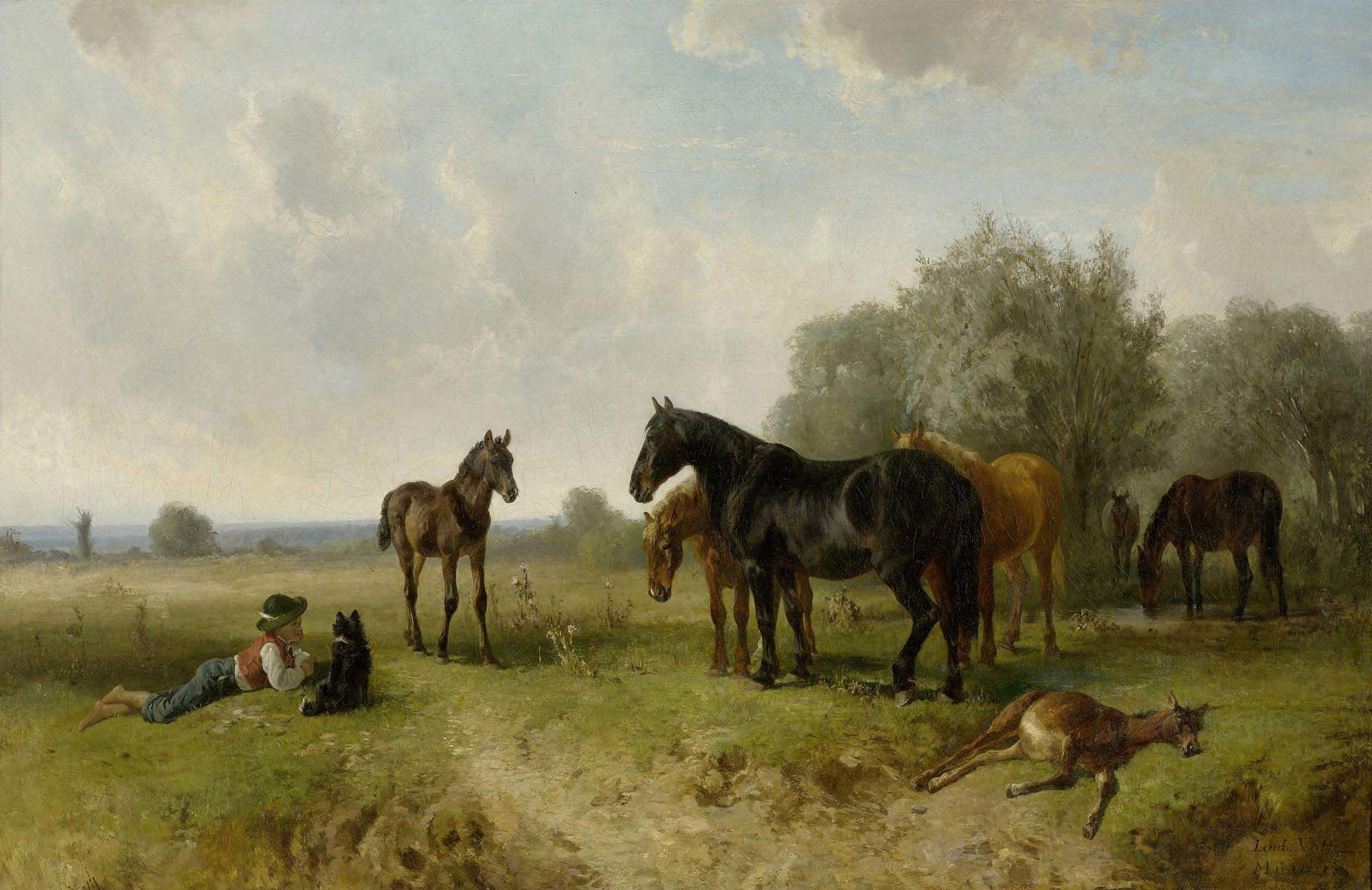
Group of Horses with a Shepherd and a Dog

Ludwig Gustav Voltz (28 April 1825, Augsburg – 26 December 1911, Munich) was a German landscape and animal painter. He also did illustrations.

== Biography ==
His father was the painter and engraver, Johann Michael Voltz. His older brother, Friedrich Voltz, was also an animal painter.

In 1842, he began his art studies at the Academy of Fine Arts, Munich. At first, he was influenced by the battle and genre painter, Peter von Hess but, after studying with Adolf Heinrich Lier, decided to focus on landscapes. His first exhibits were in Vienna, in 1848. His first in Munich came later, in 1854.

Eventually, he incorporated animals into his landscapes; creating horse portraits for the princely families of Thurn und Taxis and Wallerstein. In the latter part of his career, he specialized in hunting scenes. He also provided illustrations for the Münchener Bilderbogen.

He was a member of the Kunstverein München.
