= Ludmilla Assing =

German writer (1821–1880)

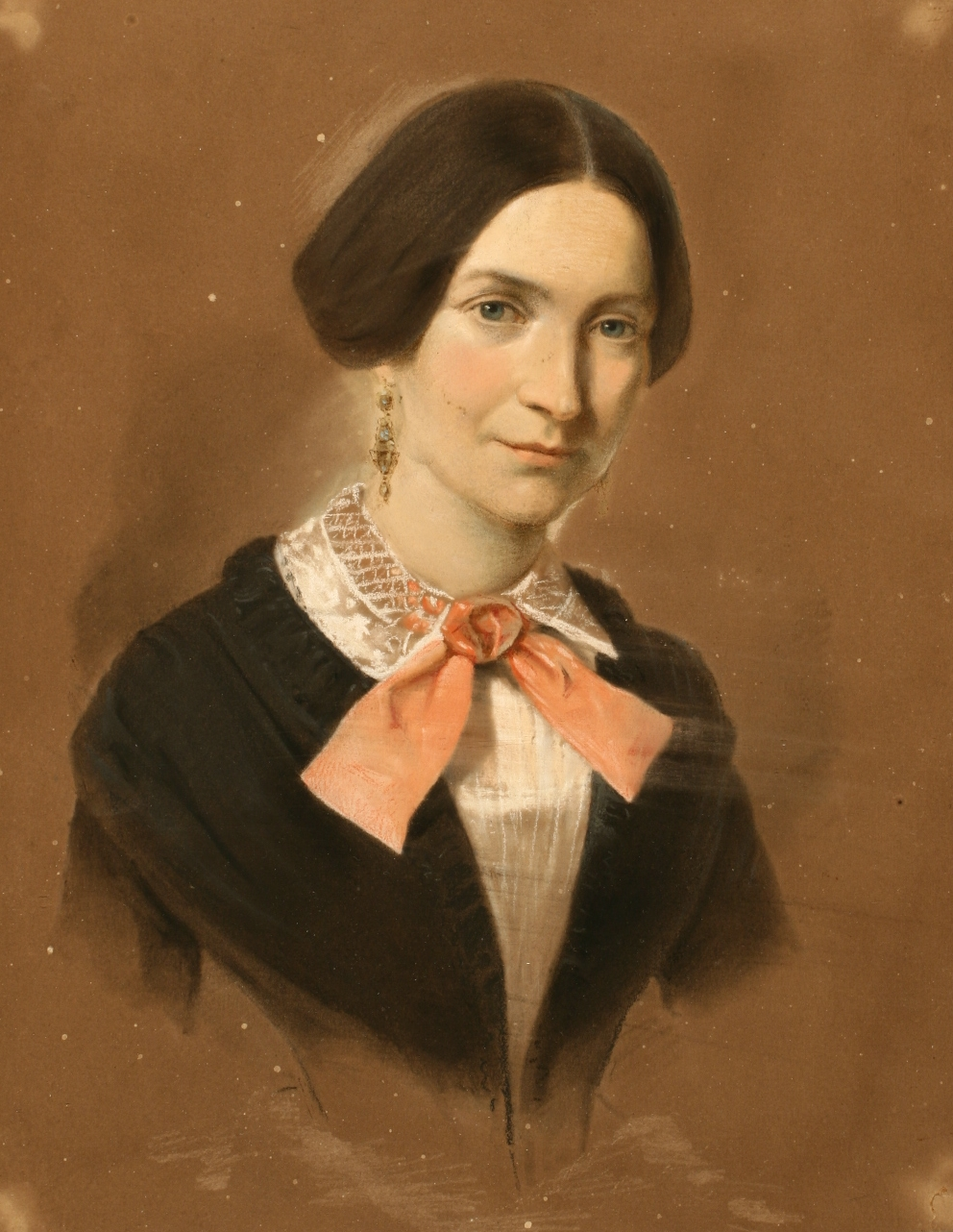
- Self portrait in pastel c. 1850
- Born: Rosa Ludmilla Assing; 22 February 1821; Hamburg, German Confederation
- Died: 25 March 1880 (aged 59); Florence, Kingdom of Italy
- Parents: David Assing (father); Rosa Maria Assing (mother)
- Relatives: Ottilie Assing (sister)
- Writing career
- Pen name: Achim Lothar; Talora
- Language: German; Italian
- Subjects: Biography; politics

Rosa Ludmilla Assing (22 February 1821 in Hamburg – 25 March 1880 in Florence) was a German writer, who also wrote under the pseudonyms Achim Lothar and Talora.

== Life ==
Ludmilla Assing was the second daughter of author Rosa Maria Varnhagen and David Assur Assing, a physician from Königsberg. Her elder sister Ottilie Assing was a feminist author, an abolitionist activist, and a friend of Frederick Douglass's.

David Assing converted to Lutheranism so he could marry Ludmilla's mother, Rosa Maria Assing — although, seeking the company of other Jews, the family moved into a Jewish neighbourhood where Assing would feel more comfortable.

Ludmilla's parents were liberal intellectuals and held cultural salons attended by authors and thinkers including Heinrich Heine, Friedrich Hebbel, Karl Gutzkow and poets of the Young Germany (Junges Deutschland) movement.

After the death of her parents she moved to Berlin to live with her uncle, author Karl August Varnhagen von Ense, Ludmilla's mother's younger brother. He was married to Rahel Varnhagen. who was famous for her salon. As well as conversing about politics, Ludmilla made accomplished pastel portraits of her uncle's visitors, including Gottfried Keller, with whom she corresponded for many years. Her sister Ottilie left home after an argument and later emigrated to the US.

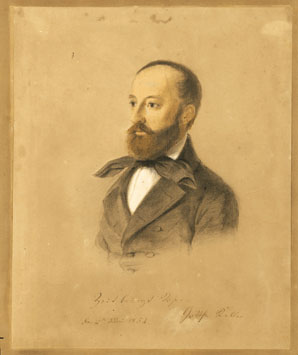
Portrait of Gottfried Keller by Ludmila Assing

On her uncle's death in 1858 Ludmilla inherited his collection of documents. She prepared the scandalous letters of Alexander von Humboldt for publication in 1869 and Varnhagen's diaries which appeared in print from 1862 to 1870 in 14 volumes. This brought her worldwide fame but also into conflict with the authorities. Otto von Bismarck ordered that the diaries covering the year 1848 be seized, and forbade their publisher Brockhaus from distributing them. Assing fled to Florence in Italy and continued her activities as an author and editor. She joined the left wing of the Risorgimento movement to unify Italy and wrote about politics in Italian and German for periodicals in each country as well as translating Italian texts into German.

Ludmilla Assing's friends included Ferdinand Lassalle, Georg and Emma Herwegh, Hedwig Dohm and Hermann, Fürst von Pückler-Muskau. After Pückler's death she wrote his biography and prepared his unpublished literary works for print.

Assing died of meningitis in Florence in 1880. A physician had "diagnosed insanity and had her transferred to a mental asylum, where she fell into coma from which she never recovered". Ludmilla left her "estate—her house, her money, and her security bonds— ... to her Italian political friends, the Battaglias", and left nothing to her sister Ottilie or to her "servants, Assunta and Eugenio, who had been promised a pension...."

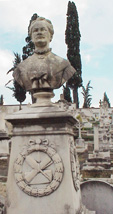
Ludmilla Assing's grave and bust in Florence, Italy

== Private life ==
She married 25-year-old Italian Bersaglieri lieutenant Gino (or Cino) Grimelli in 1873 or 1874, when she was 52 or 53, resulting in her being credited as Ludmilla Assing-Grimelli in later published works. The marriage was deemed scandalous, Grimelli "apparently ... had abused and cheated on her"; two months later she "kicked him out", paying "20,000 thalers as well as a monthly allowance to get rid of the man", and "[a] year later the couple were divorced". Grimelli committed suicide in 1878.
