= Amalie Schoppe =

German writer (1791–1858)

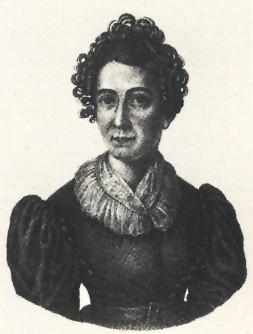
Amalie Schoppe

Amalie Schoppe (9 October 1791, Burg auf Fehmarn, as Amalie Weise – 25 September 1858, Schenectady, New York) was a German author. She was also known by her pseudonyms Adalbert von Schonen, Amalia and Marie. She is most notable as the author of books for children and young people, with an oeuvre totaling 200 volumes. The Amalie-Schoppe-Weg in the Hamburg-Barmbek-Nord district of Hamburg and the Amalie-Schoppe-Straße in Burg auf Fehmarn are named after her.

== Life ==
The daughter of the doctor Friedrich Wilhelm Weise, after her father's death in 1798 she moved to live with an uncle with Hamburg, until her mother remarried in 1802 to the Hamburg businessman Johann Georg Burmeister. Schoppe showed talent in her youth above all for languages and medicine.

In 1814 she married F. H. Schoppe, later to become a lawyer, and they had three sons before his early death in 1829. After her husband's death she provided for her family by her prolific writing, as well as occasionally running a girls' reformatory alongside Fanny Tarnow.

Her friends included Rosa Maria Assing, Justinus Kerner and Adelbert von Chamisso, along with the young poet Friedrich Hebbel, whom she introduced to patrons and allowed to use her study. From 1827 to 1846 she edited the Pariser Modeblätter as well writing literary articles for it. She also wrote for several other magazines and from 1831 to 1839 edited the young peoples' magazine Iduna. From 1842 to 1845 she lived in Jena, before moving back to Hamburg and finally in 1851 to the United States of America with her son, where she died aged 66 in Schenectady, New York

== Selected works ==
- Die Verwaisten, Leipzig 1825 (Digital version)
- Die Auswanderer nach Brasilien oder die Hütte am Gigitonhonha; nebst noch andern moralischen und unterhaltenden Erzählungen für die geliebte Jugend von 10 bis 14 Jahren, Amelang, Berlin 1828 (Digital version)
- Die Helden und Götter des Nordens, oder: Das Buch der Sagen, Berlin 1832 (Digital version)
- „…das wunderbarste Wesen, so ich je sah.“ Eine Schriftstellerin des Biedermeier (1791–1858) in Briefen und Schriften, herausgegeben von Hargen Thomsen, Bielefeld 2008. ISBN 978-3-89528-687-2

== Bibliography ==
- (in German) Carsten Erich Carstens: Schoppe, Amalia. In: Allgemeine Deutsche Biographie (ADB). Vol 32, Duncker & Humblot, Leipzig 1891, S. 368 f.
- (in German) Nikolaus Gatter: Schoppe, Amalie. In: Neue Deutsche Biographie (NDB). Vol 23, Duncker & Humblot, Berlin 2007, S. 74 f.
- (in German) Beate Mitterer: Der historische Roman von Schriftstellerinnen der ersten Hälfte des 19. Jahrhunderts. Darstellung und Bewertung von Geschichte in den historischen Romanen von Wilhelmine von Gersdorf, Karoline Pichler und Amalie Schoppe. Univ. Dipl.-Arb., Innsbruck 2004.
- (in German) Kurt Schleucher: Das Leben der Amalia Schoppe und Johanna Schopenhauer. Turris-Verl., Darmstadt 1978. ISBN 3-87830-009-3
