= Rosa Maria Assing =

German poet (1783–1840)

- Born: 28 May 1783; Düsseldorf, Holy Roman Empire
- Died: 22 January 1840 (aged 56); Hamburg, Germany
- Occupations: Lyric poet; prose-writer; educator; translator; silhouette artist
- Spouse: David Assing
- Children: Ottilie Assing; Ludmilla Assing
- Relatives: Karl August Varnhagen (brother); Rahel Varnhagen (sister-in-law)

Rosa Maria Antonetta Paulina Assing (née Varnhagen; 28 May 1783, Düsseldorf – 22 January 1840, Hamburg) was a German lyric poet, prose-writer, educator, translator, and silhouette artist. She was the elder sister of Karl August Varnhagen, sister-in-law of Rahel Levin, wife of David Assing (1787 – 1842), and mother of Ottilie and Ludmilla Assing, the former known for her friendship with Frederick Douglass. Her friends included Amalie Schoppe, David Veit, and Fanny Tarnow. Rosa Maria Assing wrote the novella The Chimney Sweeper, which illustrated her belief "that class and race were irrelevant when love was based on physical, intellectual, and moral compatability...."

== Bibliography ==
- Johann Friedrich Ludwig Theodor Merzdorf: "Assing, David." In: Allgemeine Deutsche Biographie (ADB). Band 1, Duncker & Humblot, Leipzig 1875, S. 624 f. – Nebeneintrag
- Maria Diedrich, Love Across Color Lines: Ottilie Assing and Frederick Douglass (Hill and Wang, 1999).
