= Ludwig Robert =

German dramatist

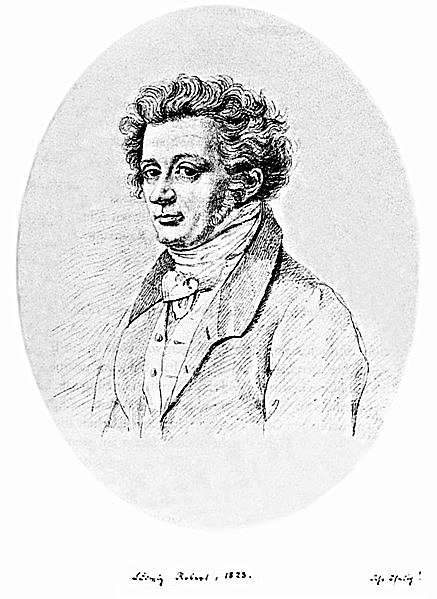
- Born: Liepmann Levin; 16 December 1778; Berlin, Kingdom of Prussia
- Died: 5 July 1832 (aged 53); Baden-Baden, Grand Duchy of Baden, German Confederation

Ernst Friedrich Ludwig Robert (or Robert-Tornow; 16 December 1778 – 5 July 1832) was a German dramatist.

== Life ==
Ludwig Robert was born in Berlin as Liepmann Levin, into a well-off Jewish family, a brother of Rahel Varnhagen von Ense. He wrote plays, including the tragedy Die Macht der Verhältnisse (1819) which deals with the position of Jews in society:

Ludwig Robert was the first German author to write Jewish material that dealt with a biblical subject.

— Ezra Mendelsohn, "Dramatic History: Reflections on a Biblical Play by Ludwig Robert"

He died, aged 53, in Baden-Baden.
