= The Pity of It All =

2002 book by Amos Elon

The Pity of It All: A Portrait of Jews In Germany, 1743–1933
- First edition (US)
- Author: Amos Elon
- Subject: German Jews
- Genre: History
- Publisher: Metropolitan Books (US); Allen Lane (UK)
- Publication date: 2002
- Pages: 403
- ISBN: 9780140283945

The Pity of It All: A Portrait of Jews In Germany, 1743–1933 is a 2002 book by Israeli journalist and author Amos Elon. The book describes the history of the German Jews between the years 1743 and 1933. The book's narrative focuses on the constant efforts of the German Jews to assimilate and become an integral part of their host country.

(The German translation has a different title: "Zu einer anderen Zeit: Porträt der jüdisch-deutschen Epoche (1743-1933)".)
