= Amos Elon =

Israeli journalist and author (1926–2009)

- עמוס אילון
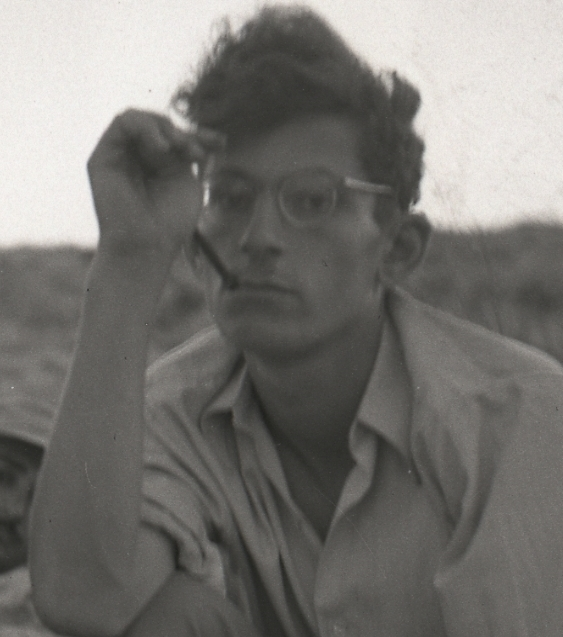
- Elon in 1949
- Born: Heinrich Sternbach; 4 July 1926; Vienna, Austria
- Died: 25 May 2009 (aged 82); Borgo a Buggiano, Italy
- Education: Tel Aviv University; Hebrew University of Jerusalem; University of Cambridge
- Occupations: Journalist; author
- Spouse: Beth Drexler (m. 1961)
- Children: Danae Elon

Amos Elon (Hebrew: עמוס אילון; 4 July 1926 – 25 May 2009) was an Israeli journalist and author. He was a writer for the newspaper Haaretz for most of his career and contributed essays to The New Yorker, The New York Times Magazine and The New York Review of Books. He also wrote books on Jewish history, the early Zionist movement and the Israeli–Palestinian conflict. Elon became known in Israel and abroad as an early and prominent critic of the Israeli occupation of the West Bank and the Gaza Strip.

In his obituary, the Los Angeles Times called Elon "one of the most distinguished and provocative Israeli authors of his time".

== Biography ==
Elon was born Heinrich Sternbach on 4 July 1926 in Vienna. In 1933, he immigrated with his family to Mandatory Palestine, where his father established an import-export business in Tel Aviv. He served three years in the Haganah, the main Zionist paramilitary organisation Mandatory Palestine. He then studied law and history at Tel Aviv University, the Hebrew University of Jerusalem and the University of Cambridge, where he was a British Council scholar at Peterhouse.

== Career ==
Elon began writing for Haaretz in 1951, initially focusing on Israel's new immigrants and the disadvantaged sectors of Israeli society, which he called the "Second Israel". He then served as a roving correspondent for the paper in Europe, writing from West Germany, France, Poland, and Hungary. In 1956, he witnessed the Poznań protests in Poland and the Soviet invasion of Hungary. Elon then spent six years as Haaretz's correspondent in Washington, D.C., where he befriended John F. Kennedy. Following this, he returned to covering Europe, reporting from Bonn and Paris, before coming back to Israel in 1965 to join Haaretz's editorial board. His travels in Germany as a reporter served as the basis for his first book, Journey Through a Haunted Land (1966), a portrait of Germany since the end of World War II. Elon took a leave of absence from Haaretz from 1971 to 1978, eventually retiring from the paper in 1986.

In his writing on the Israeli–Palestinian conflict, Elon was an early advocate for the creation of a Palestinian state and withdrawal from the territories occupied by Israel since 1967. He also spoke out against Armenian genocide denial and the Yad Vashem memorial's boycott of the 1982 International Conference on Holocaust and Genocide over its inclusion of the Armenian genocide.

Elon was the author of one novel, Timetable (1980), and eight works of nonfiction, including books on Jewish history and the Israeli-Palestinian conflict and biographies of Theodor Herzl, the father of modern political Zionism, and Mayer Amschel Rothschild, the founder of the Rothschild banking dynasty. He rose to international fame in the early 1970s after publishing The Israelis: Founders and Sons, described as "an affectionate but unsparing portrait of the early Zionists". A frequent contributor to The New Yorker, The New York Times Magazine and The New York Review of Books, he was widely regarded as one of Israel's leading journalists and public intellectuals.

In 2002, Elon published his last book, The Pity of It All, a portrait of German Jewry from the mid-18th century until the rise of Adolf Hitler. The book received positive reviews, although some criticized its lack of attention paid to lower-class German Jews.

In 2007–2008, Elon was a fellow at the Center for Law and Security at New York University School of Law.

== Views on Zionism ==
In 1975, Elon wrote an admiring if critical biography of Theodor Herzl. In a 2002 essay for The New York Review of Books, he heavily criticized Israeli settlements in the West Bank, saying: "Imagine the effect on the peace process in Northern Ireland if the British government continued moving thousands of Protestants from Scotland into Ulster and settling them, at government expense, on land confiscated from Irish Catholics... With few exceptions, the settlements have not made Israel more 'secure', as was sometimes claimed; they have made Israel less secure." In a 2004 interview with journalist Ari Shavit, he stated that Zionism had "exhausted itself" and that he had come to consider the Israeli occupation of the West Bank and Gaza as "perhaps the least successful attempt at colonialism that I can think of. This is the crappiest colonial regime that I can think of in the modern age."

== Personal life ==
In 1961, Elon married Beth Drexler, a New York-born literary agent, with whom he had one daughter, Danae, a documentary filmmaker based in Montreal, Quebec. In the 1990s, he began to spend much of his time in Italy. In 2004, he sold his home in Jerusalem and moved there permanently, citing disillusionment with developments in Israel since 1967.

Elon died of leukemia on 25 May 2009 in Borgo a Buggiano in Tuscany, aged 82. In 2005, his daughter Danae produced a biographical film about him, entitled Another Road Home.

== Published works ==
=== Fiction ===
- Timetable. Doubleday. 1980. ISBN 0385157959.

=== Nonfiction ===
- Journey Through a Haunted Land: The New Germany. Holt, Rinehart and Winston. 1966. ISBN 9997549767.
- Israelis Founders and Sons. Holt, Rinehart and Winston. 1971. ISBN 3217050096.
- Herzl. Holt, Rinehart and Winston. 1975. ISBN 003013126X.
- Flight into Egypt. Doubleday. 1980. ISBN 0385157967.
- Jerusalem: City of Mirrors. Little, Brown and Company. 1989. ISBN 0316233889.
- A Blood-Dimmed Tide: Dispatches from the Middle East. Columbia University Press. 1997. ISBN 0231107420.
- Founder: A Portrait of the First Rothschild and His Time. Viking. 1996. ISBN 0670868574.
- The Pity of It All: A History of the Jews in Germany, 1743-1933. Metropolitan Books. 2002. ISBN 0805059644.
