= David Assing =

Prussian physician and poet (1787–1842)

David Assur Assing
- Born: David Assur; 12 December 1787; Königsberg, Prussia
- Died: 25 April 1842 (aged 54); Hamburg
- Spouse: Rosa Maria Varnhagen (m. 1816; died 1840)
- Children: Ottilie Assing; Ludmilla Assing

David Assur Assing (12 December 1787, Königsberg – 25 April 1842, Hamburg) was a Prussian medical doctor and poet.

== Biography ==
Assing studied at the universities of Tübingen, Halle, Vienna, and Göttingen. He received his doctorate from the University of Göttingen in August 1807, his thesis being Materiæ Alimentariæ Lineamenta ad Leges Chemico-Dynamicas Adumbrata (lit. 'Foods and Their Relation to Chemico-Dynamical Laws'). This was published at Göttingen in 1809. Three years later he went to Hamburg with the intention of settling there as a practising physician; but hardly a year passed before the war occurred for the liberation of Germany from Napoleonic rule, and he entered the army, joining a regiment of cavalry in the capacity of physician. He served first in the Russian, then in the Prussian, army.

In 1815 he returned to Hamburg, and the following year married Rosa Maria Varnhagen, the daughter of a physician of that city. Assing converted to Christianity upon marriage, and changed his surname to Assing. He was known as a student of Greek medicine, making a special study of Hippocrates. He also contributed lyric poems to the Musenalmanach, published by his friends Kerner and Chamisso; to the Tübinger Morgenblatt; and in Isidorus Hesperiden. After the death of his wife on 22 June 1840, he published "Rosa Maria's Poetischer Nachlass" (Altona, 1841). The last years of his life were passed in solitude.

Assing was the father of Ottilie and Ludmilla Assing, the former known for her friendship with Frederick Douglass.
