= Karl August Varnhagen von Ense =

German biographer, diplomat and soldier (1785–1858)

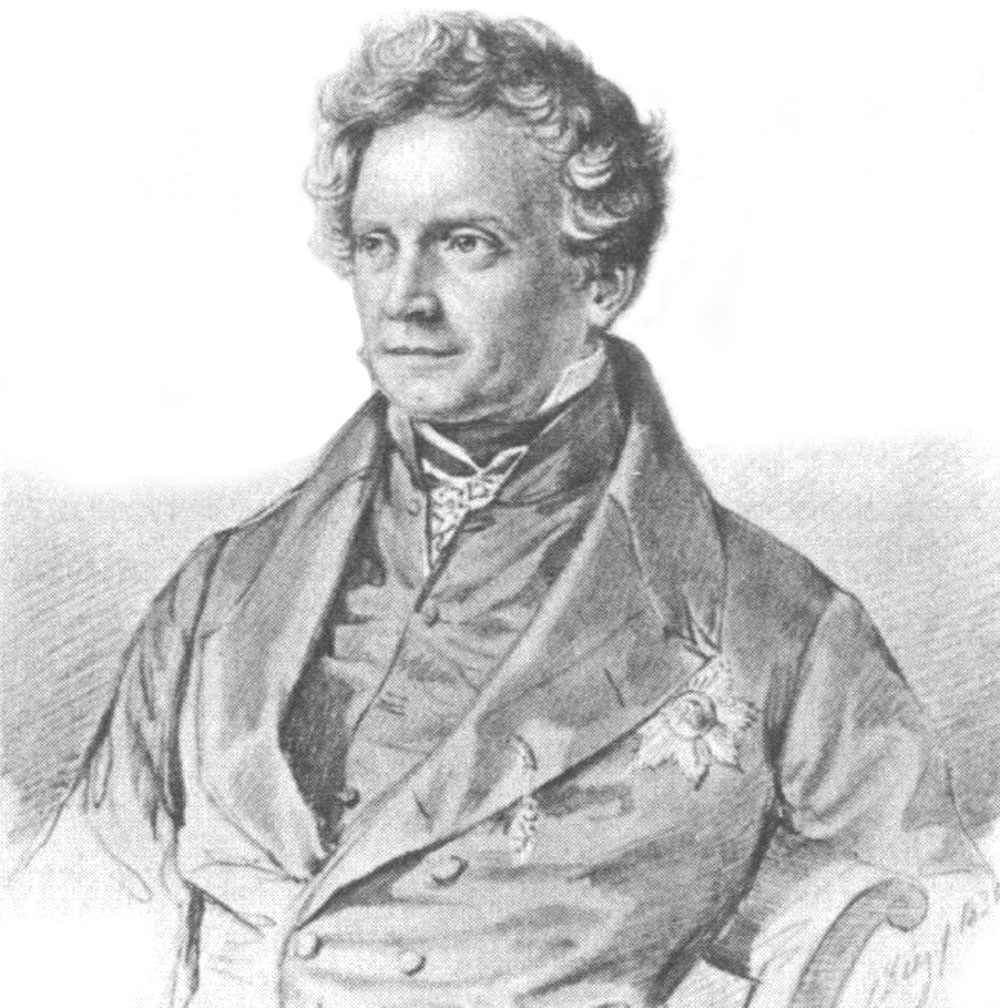
Portrait of Karl August Varnhagen von Ense by Samuel Friedrich Diez.

Karl August Varnhagen von Ense (21 February 1785, Düsseldorf – 10 October 1858, Berlin) was a German biographer, diplomat and soldier.

== Life and career ==
He was born in Düsseldorf, the younger brother of Rosa Maria Varnhagen, a noted poet, writer, and educator. He studied medicine in Berlin, but most of his time was spent examining philosophy and literature, which he later studied more thoroughly at Halle and Tübingen. He began his literary career in 1804 working along with Adelbert von Chamisso on his Berliner Musenalmanach.

In 1809, he joined the main Austrian army under Archduke Charles, serving in IR47 Vogelsang at the Battle of Wagram, where he was wounded on the first day, 5 July. He was then made adjutant to Prince Bentheim, whom he accompanied to Paris, where he continued his studies. In 1812, he entered the Prussian civil service in Berlin but soon left to enter the Russian service as captain. He served in Tettenborn's corps as adjutant to Tettenborn on trips to Hamburg and Paris. He recorded his experiences in Geschichte der Hamburger Ereignisse (History of the events in Hamburg; London, 1813) and Geschichte der Kriegszüge Tettenborns (History of Tettenborn's Campaigns, 1814). He worked as a tutor and butler in the homes of several families of the wealthy Jewish bourgeoisie. This allowed him to learn from an early age young characters in his time, some already famous, such as: Adelbert von Chamisso, Justinus Kerner, Friedrich de la Motte Fouqué, Ludwig Uhland and many other poets of romanticism.

He accompanied Prince Hardenberg to the Congress of Vienna in 1814, and between 1815 and 1819 he served as Prussian Minister-Resident at Carlsruhe. After 1819, he resided chiefly in Berlin, bearing the title "Geheimer Legationsrat." He had no fixed official appointment but was often employed in important political business.

He carried on an extensive correspondence with Alexander von Humboldt, and two volumes of Humboldt's letters to him have been published.

On 10 October 1858, while playing chess with his niece, Karl August Varnhagen von Ense died of unknown causes. His last words, shortly before his death, were, "I lost."

== Writings ==
Although he developed a reputation as an imaginative and critical writer, he is most famous as a biographer. He possessed a remarkable ability to group facts together and to bring out their essential significance. His style is distinguished for its strength, grace and purity. Among his principal works are:

- Goethe in den Zeugnissen der Mitlebenden (1824)
- Biographische Denkmäler (5 vols., 1824–30; 3rd edition, 1872)
- Biographies of General von Seydlitz (1834), Field-Marshal Gebhard Leberecht von Blücher, victor over Napoleon at Waterloo, Sophia Charlotte, Queen of Prussia (1837), Field-Marshal Schwerin (1841), Field-Marshal Keith (1844), and General Bülow von Dennewitz (1853)

His Denkwürdigkeiten und vermischte Schriften appeared in nine volumes in 1843–59, the last two volumes appearing after his death. His niece, Ludmilla Assing, between 1860 and 1867, edited several volumes of his correspondence with eminent men and his Tagebücher (14 vols., 1861–70). Blätter aus der preussischen Geschichte appeared in five volumes (1868–69); his correspondence with his wife, Rahel, appeared in six volumes in 1874–75; and that with Carlyle in 1892.

His selected writings appeared in 19 volumes in 1871–76.

== Family ==
In 1814, he married saloniste Rahel Levin after she converted from Judaism to Christianity. Varnhagen was devotedly attached to her and found in her sympathy and encouragement. She was one of the chief sources of his inspiration as a writer. He never fully recovered from the shock of her death in 1833, but he published memorial volumes containing selections from her papers: Rahel, ein Buch des Andenkens für ihre Freunde (Rahel, a memorial book for her friends, 3 vols., 1834) and Galerie von Bildnissen aus Rahels Umgang (A gallery of portraits from Rahel's circle, 2 vols., 1836).
