= Kota Hoshino =

Japanese composer (born 1975)

Kota Hoshino 星野 康太
- Born: April 23, 1975 (age 51); Tokyo, Japan
- Genres: Ambient; rock; techno; industrial; video game music
- Occupations: Composer; musician; sound designer
- Instruments: Bass guitar; piano; synthesizer
- Years active: 1998–present

Kota Hoshino (星野 康太, Hoshino Kōta) (born April 23, 1975) is a Japanese composer and sound designer who works for the video game developer FromSoftware. Hoshino is best known for composing multiple games in the Armored Core series and as the bassist and singer of their internal band FreQuency.

== Career ==
Hoshino was born in Tokyo, Japan on April 23, 1975, and studied at Surugadai University. Hoshino began working at FromSoftware in spring of 1998, feeling that his music would complement the games' visuals. His first role was composing music for Shadow Tower for the PlayStation. As the game uses very little music, many of Hoshino's contributions were unused, though some unused tracks were later used in Evergrace. The same year, he contributed music for Echo Night. In 1999, Hoshino composed the soundtrack of Armored Core: Master of Arena with Tsukasa Saitoh and Keiichiro Segawa, and had since written music for the series. During the FromSoftware Games Event Autumn 2018 in Osaka, Hoshino said that the game's opening theme, "Apex in Circle," was a challenging composition as it had to match the development of the intro cutscene. Hoshino stated that he cannot read music, so he usually does not compose orchestral scores. Hoshino was the composer and sound designer for Evergrace, which released in 2000 for the PlayStation 2. For the soundtrack, Hoshino used voices as the primary instrument, editing samples of his own with Sound Forge to create an "ethnic" sound, in addition to instruments including shakuhachi, shamisen, and synthesized percussion.

Hoshino composed for Armored Core: Verdict Day with Yuka Kitamura, which released in 2013. Following the game's release, Hoshino worked mainly on sound design, including Sekiro: Shadows Die Twice and Elden Ring, and returned to music duties with Armored Core VI: Fires of Rubicon as lead composer. During development, Hoshino was given keywords by game director Masaru Yamamaura in order to set the game's tone and evoke a "sense of loneliness and nostalgia." The game's soundtrack released physically on March 20, 2024, which included arrangements and some original compositions in a bonus third disc by various FromSoftware composers. For his own contributions to Disc 3, Hoshino sought to incorporate elements that he felt he couldn't deliver to the game's original soundtrack.

=== FreQuency ===
Hoshino is the bassist and vocalist of FreQuency, a band composed of members of FromSoftware's sound team, led with Tsukasa Saitoh. The band released songs through the FROMSOUND RECORDS label. In 2011, the band released its debut album, Armored Core Reprises, which contains arrangements of music from the Armored Core series. In 2013, the band released its second album, Sunrise, composed of original songs and arrangements. FreQuency performed Day After Day, a song for the trailer of Armored Core: Verdict Day. Following positive reception, the song alongside an instrumental version and two tracks released as an extended play of the same name in 2014. FreQuency composed and performed "Fallout," which was used for the trailer of Metal Wolf Chaos XD, a 2019 remaster of the 2004 Xbox title.

== Works ==
Video games
| Year | Title | Notes |
|---|---|---|
| 1998 | Shadow Tower | |
| 1998 | Echo Night | with Tsukasa Saitoh and Keiichiro Segawa |
| 1999 | Spriggan: Lunar Verse | sound design |
| 1999 | Armored Core: Master of Arena | with Tsukasa Saitoh and Keiichiro Segawa |
| 1999 | Echo Night 2: The Lord of Nightmares | sound design |
| 1999 | Frame Gride | |
| 2000 | Evergrace | |
| 2000 | Armored Core 2 | with Yuji Kanda, Ikuya Ichinohe, and Keiichiro Segawa |
| 2000 | The Adventures of Cookie & Cream | with Ikuya Ichinohe |
| 2001 | Forever Kingdom | |
| 2002 | Lost Kingdoms | |
| 2002 | Armored Core 3 | additional music (with Tsukasa Saitoh and Yuki Ichiki) |
| 2002 | Murakumo: Renegade Mech Pursuit | sound design |
| 2003 | Silent Line: Armored Core | additional music (with Tsukasa Saitoh and Takeshi Yanagawa) |
| 2003 | Lost Kingdoms II | |
| 2003 | Shadow Tower: Abyss | sound design |
| 2003 | Otogi 2: Immortal Warriors | sound design |
| 2004 | Armored Core: Nexus | with Tsukasa Saitoh, Yukinori Takada, and Yuji Kanda |
| 2004 | Armored Core: Nine Breaker | |
| 2004 | Metal Wolf Chaos | with Shohei Tsuchiya |
| 2004 | Tenchu: Fatal Shadows | "A Reluctant Independence" |
| 2005 | Another Century's Episode | sound design |
| 2005 | Armored Core: Formula Front | sound design |
| 2006 | Armored Core 4 | with Koichi Suenaga and Ayako Minami |
| 2006 | Chromehounds | |
| 2007 | Another Century's Episode 3: The Final | sound design |
| 2008 | Armored Core: For Answer | with Hideyuki Eto |
| 2012 | Armored Core V | with Yoshikazu Takayama, Tsukasa Saitoh, and Hideyuki Eto |
| 2013 | Armored Core: Verdict Day | with Yuka Kitamura |
| 2014 | Dark Souls II | sound design |
| 2015 | Dark Souls II: Scholar of the First Sin | sound design |
| 2016 | Dark Souls III | sound design |
| 2019 | Sekiro: Shadows Die Twice | sound design |
| 2022 | Elden Ring | sound design |
| 2023 | Armored Core VI: Fires of Rubicon | with Takashi Onodera and Shoi Miyazawa |

FreQuency
| Year | Title |
|---|---|
| 2011 | Armored Core Reprises |
| 2013 | Sunrise |
| 2014 | Day After Day |

Other
| Year | Title | Notes |
|---|---|---|
| 2009 | DoDonPachi Dai-Ou-Jou Premium Arrange Album | arranged "Red Bee" |
| 2009 | Mushihimesama Double Arrange Album | arranged "On the Verge of Madness" |
| 2010 | GE-ON-DAN Rare Trax Ver. 1.0 | "Theme from G.O.D." |
| 2024 | ARMORED CORE VI FIRES OF RUBICON Original Soundtrack | arrangements for Disc 3 with others; composition for "Blackout" |
