= Armored Core (video game) =

1997 video game

- North American cover art
- Developer: FromSoftware
- Publisher: Sony Computer Entertainment: JP: FromSoftware
- Director: Toshifumi Nabeshima
- Producer: Yasuyoshi Karasawa
- Programmers: Hiroyuki Arai; Masayuki Saito
- Artist: Shōji Kawamori
- Composers: Keiichiro Segawa; Masaru Tateyama
- Series: Armored Core
- Platform: PlayStation
- Release: JP: July 10, 1997; NA: October 22, 1997; EU: June 1, 1998
- Genre: Third-person shooter
- Modes: Single player, multiplayer

Armored Core (Japanese: アーマード・コア) is a 1997 third-person shooter mecha video game developed by FromSoftware for the PlayStation. The first installment in the Armored Core series, it was released outside Japan by Sony Computer Entertainment. A digital port was released in 2007 in Japan and 2015 in North America on the PlayStation Network as a part of the PSone Classics line of games.

The story introduces many elements that are commonly found in later games in the series, such as corporatocracies and mech robots known as "Armored Cores". The game takes place in a future Earth that has been wiped out by a cataclysm and forced humanity underground, a theme which would continue until Armored Core 4.

Gameplay involves controlling Armored Cores in combat scenarios against other Cores and vehicles. Cores are highly modular, allowing players a great deal of customization over them, such as swapping out different leg units to gain speed advantages. As players complete more missions, they gain credits to purchase different items and parts for their Core. Armored Core was favorably received by critics, who were especially impressed with its customization and multiplayer.

== Gameplay ==
Armored Core's levels are extremely open, forcing the player to look around for enemies that can appear from all directions.

In single-player, players choose missions to engage enemies and earn credits. Within missions, the player navigates levels built on different kinds of terrain, ranging from desert bases to space stations. Levels are extremely open, forcing the player to look around for enemies that can appear from all directions. Like many shooters, the primary weapon types available for use are guns, rocket launchers, lasers, missiles, and swords which can be customized at will based on player purchases. Ammunition and repair costs are deducted from mission rewards, and mission failure still penalizes the player with these deductions. The player is responsible for purchasing their weapons and AC parts, and must use the money they earn from missions to that end.

As the player progresses through missions, the pay increases, but choosing specific missions can lock others down, creating a branching path through the story that can be noticeably different on subsequent play sessions.

The game has a two-player versus mode using a split screen or the PlayStation Link Cable.

== Plot ==
The vast majority of Earth's population is wiped out by a cataclysmic war known as the "Great Destruction". The harsh conditions that result force the few remaining survivors to live underground for fifty years, during which time corporations come to power. The two largest corporations, Chrome and Murakumo Millennium, constantly battle each other for supremacy, causing significant strife among the populace. However, the competition provides endless opportunities for mercenaries called Ravens, who exist independently of the corporations. The player is a Raven and pilots an Armored Core (AC), powerful mecha robots that fight for the highest bidder. Ravens are provided by a neutral organization known as Ravens' Nest.

The player begins their career after taking the Raven Test at Ravens' Nest training ground. If successful, the player receives a mail from "R", the Ravens' Nest operator. The player then begins to take missions from the corporations. After every mission, the player can decide to customise their AC. As the player progresses, the missions become increasingly difficult. The player can also receive mail from Char, a Murakumo agent. Throughout the game, the two corporations continue their conflict until they both break apart and fall.

The final mission, which is requested by Ravens' Nest itself, is implied to be a trap to kill the player, (presumably because they have become "too powerful"), as the mission involves battling resistance in the Nest's base, destroying two Nine-Ball units (piloted by the top-ranking Raven Hustler-One, revealed to be an AI), and destroying the Nest system core.

== Development ==
The robot designs were created by renowned mecha designer Shōji Kawamori. Kawamori was approached before the PlayStation's launch and during this time, the concept of a player-designed modular mecha was one of the game's only set ideas. Kawamori thought that too much player freedom would hinder the team's ability to form a unique visual identity for the game, so he proposed the concept of "armored cores," a system in which the modularity revolved around changes around a core block containing the cockpit, engine, and joint connectors for the limbs and so on. FromSoftware adopted this as the official concept for the mecha and the name of the game.

== Release ==
Armored Core was initially released in Japan for the PlayStation on July 10, 1997. FromSoftware partnered with Sony Computer Entertainment and released a North American version on October 25 the same year, while a European version was released on June 1, 1998.

As a part of Sony's PSone Classics banner, Armored Core was re-released in Japan for the PlayStation 3 (and later the PlayStation Vita) on July 26, 2007. In North America, the game was re-released on March 24, 2015 for the PlayStation 3, PlayStation Portable, and PlayStation Vita.

Armored Core became a title for the Japanese release of the PlayStation Classic on December 3, 2018. On March 18, 2025, Armored Core was released on the PlayStation Store for PlayStation 4 and PlayStation 5, included with a PS Plus Premium subscription.

== Reception ==
Reception

Aggregate score
Aggregator	Score
GameRankings	75%

Review scores
Publication	Score
AllGame	3.5/5
Computer and Video Games	3/5
Edge	7/10
Electronic Gaming Monthly	8.25/10
Famitsu	28/40
Game Informer	8.25/10
GameRevolution	B+
GameSpot	8.3/10
IGN	8/10
Next Generation	4/5
Official U.S. PlayStation Magazine	3.5/5
Dengeki PlayStation	85/100, 80/100, 70/100, 60/100

Reviewers praised the gameplay of Armored Core, highlighting the depth of customization options afforded to the player. Game Revolution's Nebojsa Radakovic wrote, "A ballpark figure for possible combinations is in the very high millions," and added, "The variety of weapons is also a definite plus." GameSpot's Joe Fielder similarly praised the depth of options available, stating, "Almost as charming as the gameplay are the upgradable options for the mech". Kraig Kujawa of Electronic Gaming Monthly felt the amount of customization was the best aspect of the game. GamePro attested that "robot mechanics will have a great time shopping through the detailed onscreen catalogs and fine-tuning their killing machines."

The local multiplayer was positively received, with Radakovic calling it "a sure-fire recipe for intense death matches for the fate of the universe." Adam Douglas from IGN agreed, referring to the multiplayer as "The real meat of the game". Next Generation noted the immense size and great variety of the multiplayer arenas.

A common complaint from reviewers was that the speed of turning is too slow. IGN, Next Generation, and GamePro all commented on this, with Douglas describing it as his "only complaint".

Radakovic praised the graphics, writing they were "excellent with a high attention to detail." AllGame's Shawn Sackenheim agreed with this, describing, "Crisp texture maps with little pixelation and distortion carry visuals to a new level." Next Generation had a different outlook, stating, "while crisp, [they] do lean a little to the bland side". Fielder wrote, "Its graphics ... are fitting and workable."

Reviewers both praised and criticized the soundtrack, which was described as being fitting and lacking depending on the source. Game Informer's consensus was that, "All the sounds are appropriate and the soundtrack is as thumping as it can get." Radakovic disagreed, writing, "there is little to no background music in the game; so mostly all you hear is the sound of gunfire and metallic footsteps." GamePro commented, "The effects are the stars of the audio show with great blasts and clanking metal body parts. The fusion music tries hard but quickly gets repetitive."

Armored Core's story was criticized as unoriginal and underdeveloped, while some reviewers also commented on the length of the campaign. Game Informer's Andy McNamara stated, "If you're looking for something with plot, you aren't going to find it here". Douglas felt that the missions were "pretty straightforward". Radakovic wrote that the developers "don't get an award for plot originality" and mentioned that he felt the campaign was too short, saying, "50 missions may sound like a lot, but they can go by pretty quickly if you know what you're doing." However, most critics felt that the inclusion of a story campaign with sophisticated missions put Armored Core a cut above its contemporary Virtual On: Cyber Troopers, which contains only small-scale mech vs. mech fights. Kujawa even found that the increasing difficulty of the missions can force the player to adapt their play style as well as upgrading their mech.

The game held a 75% on the review aggregation website GameRankings at the time of its 2019 closure, based on eight reviews.

== Sequels and legacy ==
Armored Core is the first entry in a mecha game series of the same name, and spawned many sequels, including Armored Core: Project Phantasma and Armored Core: Master of Arena. The making of Armored Core solidified FromSoftware's development skills, and in July 1999, they released the multiplayer action game Frame Gride for the Sega Dreamcast. The company's focus would shift from RPGs to mech games due in part to the success of the Armored Core series. In 2002, FromSoftware released the mech action game Murakumo: Renegade Mech Pursuit for the Xbox. In 2004, they released another Xbox title, Metal Wolf Chaos. In 2005, FromSoftware started to produce a series of licensed games based on various mecha-based anime properties under the banner Another Century's Episode.
