= Armored Core: Nine Breaker =

2004 video game

- North American box art
- Developer: FromSoftware
- Publishers: JP: FromSoftware; NA: Agetec; EU: 505 Games
- Producer: Toshifumi Nabeshima
- Programmer: Akitoshi Sasamoto
- Artists: Yuzo Kojima; Makoto Sato
- Composer: Kota Hoshino
- Series: Armored Core
- Platform: PlayStation 2
- Release: JP: October 28, 2004; NA: September 13, 2005; EU: May 5, 2006
- Genre: Third-person shooter
- Modes: Single player, multiplayer

Armored Core: Nine Breaker is a 2004 third-person shooter video game developed by FromSoftware for the PlayStation 2. It is the ninth entry in the Armored Core series and a spin-off to Armored Core: Nexus.

Nine Breaker removed story missions and placed much more focus on the Arena mode found in previous games. Training missions reveal that an organization has put the Arena mode together in order to train pilots for a potential future war as currently all corporations are at peace.

Players pilot mech robots called Armored Cores in a competitive Arena ladder. Armored Cores can be customized with hundreds of parts, with some parts only available after completing certain achievements. A training mode allows for players to practice certain skills that can help them within the Arena and allow them to unlock additional parts for their mech.

== Gameplay ==
In Nine Breaker, players pilot large mech robots called Armored Cores. Unlike previous games in the franchise, players are not hired for missions and no longer earn credits, instead being only focused on fighting Arena battles to raise the player's rank.

A training mode included in the game includes 150 minigames for practicing specific exercises. Upon completion, the player is rated on their performance in the exercise. Within the Arena mode, players are placed onto a competitive ladder and must earn points from winning matches to advance on the ladder.

While previous games required that the player purchase customization options for their mech, Nine Breaker unlocks a majority of its parts from the start and allows others to be earned through performance achievements in the training or arena modes.

Previous multiplayer offerings return in Nine Breaker. Players can fight each other in 2 player split-screen modes or local network play.

== Setting ==
Unlike other Armored Core titles, Nine Breaker doesn't have a proper storyline. Instead, it focuses on a training program that sees Armored Core pilots fight each other and hone their skills in the event that another war breaks out. The game hints at an underlying plot involving an organization putting together the training program due to a rare peacetime between corporate conflicts.

== Release ==
Armored Core: Nine Breaker was initially released in Japan on October 28, 2004. FromSoftware partnered with Agetec and released a North American version on September 13, 2005. A European version was released in partnership with 505 Games on April 28, 2006.

== Reception ==
Reception

Aggregate score
Aggregator	Score
Metacritic	57/100

Review scores
Publication	Score
Eurogamer	5/10
Famitsu	29/40
GameSpot	6.2/10
GameZone	8.3/10
IGN	5.5/10
Jeuxvideo.com	12/20
PlayStation Official Magazine – UK	4/10
Official U.S. PlayStation Magazine	2.5/5
PlayStation: The Official Magazine	6/10
X-Play	2/5
Gamezilla	70%

Nine Breaker received "mixed" reviews according to the review aggregation website Metacritic. In Japan, Famitsu gave Nine Breaker a score of two sevens, one eight, and one seven for a total of 29 out of 40.

Critics noted that the game's removal of story missions, with IGN's Ivan Sulic stating: "Funny how a sequel can offer less, eh?" Dan Whitehead, writing for Eurogamer noted that the game's focus on challenges and arena combat wasn't developed well enough, calling them "a series of competition scraps to plough through for no real reason". He noted that there was a framing story, but deemed it "hilariously half-hearted".

Criticism of the franchise's iterative nature continued in Nine Breaker. IGN's Sulic wrote: "I might have been able to copy and paste the text from my Armored Core: Nexus review into this space... given how similar the two titles are". Greg Bemis from G4 commented on the "stale" nature of the franchise, writing: "If you’re one of those Armored Core fanboys, congratulations! You just bought the same game...again".

Gameplay for Nine Breaker was considered challenging like its predecessors, but some critics noted that the challenge often became frustrating due to how inaccessible it was. While GameZone found the combat systems "balanced", IGN found it to be tedious.' GameSpot's Bob Colayco called it "straightforward" and added that "the game offers a decent amount of strategy since you decide how to set up your AC in order to best match up with your opponents". Eurogamer was particularly scathing about the gameplay, writing that "only the most masochistic will persevere with this curt exercise in uninspired destruction".
