= Armored Core 2: Another Age =

2001 video game

- North American cover art
- Developer: FromSoftware
- Publishers: JP: FromSoftware; NA: Agetec; EU: Metro3D
- Producer: Toshifumi Nabeshima
- Artist: Shōji Kawamori
- Composer: Tsukasa Saitoh
- Series: Armored Core
- Platform: PlayStation 2
- Release: JP: April 12, 2001; NA: August 21, 2001; EU: September 27, 2002
- Genre: Third-person shooter
- Modes: Single player, multiplayer

Armored Core 2: Another Age is a 2001 third-person shooter mecha video game developed by FromSoftware for the PlayStation 2. It is the fifth entry in the Armored Core series and a direct sequel to Armored Core 2. A reboot of the series, Armored Core 3, was released in 2002 for the PlayStation 2.

Another Age is the final game in the original Armored Core continuity that began with 1997's Armored Core. Five years after Leos Klein's coup in Armored Core 2, the Earth government must contend with corporations rebuilding their influence and a rebel faction attempting to overthrow the existing regime.

Gameplay is extremely similar to Armored Core 2, changing few of the core mechanics. The Arena is removed from the game, making way for over 100 missions. Minor analog controller support has been added to the game along with a local cooperative mission mode. While only retained in the Japanese version, the game was notable for being the first game in the franchise to include online multiplayer.

== Gameplay ==
Another Age's gameplay retains the core mechanics of its predecessor with a few minor changes. The game revolves around accepting missions from various corporations to earn credits for new parts for the player's Armored Core unit. Like Project Phantasma and Master of Arena, Another Age acts as an expansion to Armored Core 2, though it can be played as a standalone title. The Arena, a game mode added in Project Phantasma and recurring through the series, is absent from Another Age, giving way to a greater number of missions. Whereas earlier games had a maximum of 50 missions, Another Age contains over 100, which remains the highest number of missions in a single game in the entire franchise.

Analog support is added in the game but only allows for the left analog stick to be used for movement. While other games of the era allowed for look functionality on the right analog stick, Another Age retained the franchise's use of shoulder buttons to look around.

Like its predecessors, the game includes a versus multiplayer mode that can be played in split screen or via a PlayStation I-Link Cable. An additional cooperative mission mode is included in the game that can only be played locally. In multiplayer modes, the second player can load their own personal Armored Core from a save on a second memory card.

In Japan, Another Age introduces a broadband multiplayer option that allows players to fight each other of the internet, but the feature is not included in versions released in other territories. The removal was in part because the PlayStation Network Adapter had not yet been released outside of Japan.

== Plot ==
Five years after the coup attempt led by Leos Klein the Earth government struggles to realize one of its original objectives, relocating people from the underground cities to the Earth's surface. The three largest corporations, Zio Matrix, Emeraude, and Balena, fight for dominance following a massive loss of influence. The government attempts to keep the corporations in check, but the situation is made more complex by the involvement of a rebel group, the Indies, who engage both sides in an attempt to establish a new government.

The player character is a veteran Earth Raven working for all sides. Due to the coup and the Martian war, the government has set rules restricting the actions of Ravens. The government's major aim is to reclaim the surface completely, but its attention is forcefully shifted due to the actions of the Indies and the corporations. The player can choose missions relating to each city and location, including underground cities and surface locations.

The main final mission comes from Concord Corporation, the parent corporation of Nerves Concord, the successor of Ravens' Nest. In the mission, the player is sent to assist two Ravens against an unidentified Raven who, in a rampage, has attacked and killed multiple Ravens for reasons unknown. Though the enemy Raven's identity is not revealed in-game, the enemy is actually Nine-Ball, the final antagonist of both Armored Core (video game) and Armored Core: Master of Arena. After the last mission, the player can unlock extra missions. Some of the extra missions take the player to the Lost Field, a location where the player first encounters Stinger, and then Phantasma, both antagonists of Armored Core: Project Phantasma, and Nine-Ball Seraph, the final boss of Master of Arena.

== Release ==
Armored Core 2: Another Age was initially released in Japan on April 12, 2001. FromSoftware partnered with Agetec and released a North American version on August 21 the same year. A European version was released in partnership with Metro3D on September 27, 2002.

== Reception ==
Reception

Aggregate score
Aggregator	Score
Metacritic	75/100

Review scores
Publication	Score
Edge	8/10
Electronic Gaming Monthly	5/10
Famitsu	35/40
Game Informer	8.5/10
GamePro	3.5/5
GameRevolution	B+
GameSpot	8/10
GameZone	8.7/10
IGN	7.8/10
Next Generation	4/5
Official U.S. PlayStation Magazine	3.5/5
Maxim	6/10

Another Age received "generally favorable reviews" according to the review aggregation website Metacritic. In Japan, Famitsu gave it a score of 35 out of 40.

Reviewers praised the graphics and larger mission count in Another Age. GameRevolution's Shawn Sanders wrote "the mechs are still incredibly detailed" and concluded that the game looked "awesome". GameSpot's Gerald Villoria noted that in adding the greater number of missions and optimizing the visuals, FromSoftware "improve[d] upon the already solid framework set by Armored Core 2." GameZone added that with all of the added content, "there is still plenty to love here."

Like previous games, reviewers found the gameplay to retain its quality. GameSpot's Villoria commented on the challenge that the game provided, saying: "The difficulty of the game is a testament to the game's stellar AI, which never fails to surprise with deft maneuvers that are at a nearly human level of unpredictability."

The removal of the Arena mode drew much criticism from reviewers, all of whom said that its loss was disappointing. GameRevolution's Sanders said that the removal of the mode left him "bummed", while GameSpot's Villoria called it "disappointing".

IGN's David Smith called Another Age "the best Armored Core expansion yet" but added that it was "in essence the same game." Many reviewers wrote about the lack of innovation in the title, with GameZone writing that "there is very little that is different or new compared to the other titles in the series, so if you've played one before, don't expect to be blown away." NextGen's Jim Preston wrote of the game, "Only lack of the promised online supports keeps this from earning five stars."
