= Armored Core: For Answer =

2008 video game

- North American Xbox 360 cover art
- Developer: FromSoftware
- Publishers: JP: FromSoftware; EU: Ubisoft; NA: Ubisoft
- Director: Hidetaka Miyazaki
- Producer: Toshifumi Nabeshima
- Composer: Kota Hoshino
- Series: Armored Core
- Platforms: PlayStation 3, Xbox 360
- Release: JP: March 19, 2008; NA: September 16, 2008; AU: November 27, 2008; EU: November 28, 2008
- Genre: Vehicular combat
- Modes: Single-player, multiplayer

Armored Core: For Answer is a 2008 mecha-based vehicular combat game developed by FromSoftware and published by Ubisoft for the PlayStation 3 and Xbox 360. It is the 13th installment in the mecha-based Armored Core series, the game is the direct sequel to Armored Core 4.

== Gameplay ==
AC customization features a new interface. Online mode returns with a new co-operative mode alongside the player versus mode. Gameplay enhancements an auxiliary high-speed booster. All parts carried over from the previous game have had their parameters altered, much like the transition between previous series installments Silent Line and Nexus. The game is also the third in the series (after Last Raven and Fires of Rubicon) to feature multiple endings.

== Plot ==
Five years have passed since the LYNX War. Earth is now governed by the League of Ruling Companies, an international council composed of the corporations that survived the war, which ostensibly seeks to preserve global peace and corporate prosperity. In truth, the League is little more than a puppet of its chief member, Omer Science Technology, which emerged from the LYNX War with an enormous technological advantage and seeks to keep it. Since much of the world's surface was polluted to inhospitable levels by hazardous Kojima Particles dispersed during the LYNX War, the League built perpetually-airborne habitats known as Cradles, which are dependent on ground-based power plants called Arteria that generate even more Kojima Particles as waste. Over half of the human population now lives in the Cradles, while the surface is a battlefield where corporate armies and mercenaries wage the interminable Economic War over control of Kojima Particle-based technology.

During the League's rise to power, it relied on the capabilities of LYNX, the pilots of the combat mechs known as NEXTs, and then abandoned the LYNX on the surface in favor of utilizing Arms Forts, mobile super weapons that could bring tremendous amounts of firepower to bear. While most LYNX are forced to eke out a living as mercenaries for Collared, a League-controlled intermediary organization, a handful of LYNX discovered the corporations' dark secrets and formed a resistance group called ORCA to overthrow the League. The player takes on the role of a LYNX known as Strayed who works for Collared and eventually becomes a pivotal figure in the escalating conflict between the League and ORCA.

Three ending routes can be unlocked sequentially over three playthroughs. In the first ending, Strayed is tasked by the League with stopping ORCA from seizing the Arteria. Strayed succeeds, ensuring the Cradles stay aloft. ORCA is eliminated and the League remains in power, but the existential threat posed by Kojima Particle radiation is still unsolved, and one day, it will rise to the Cradles' altitude.

In the second ending, Strayed helps ORCA take control of the Arteria. As a result, the Cradles lose power and make an emergency descent to the surface, causing many civilians to die from Kojima Particle exposure. However, the energy from the Arteria is redirected to destroy an array of autonomous weaponized satellites in Earth's orbit. The satellites had originally been put in place by the corporations years ago as a means of precluding any single corporation from exploiting space's wealth of resources and attaining economic supremacy. With the satellites neutralized, humanity gains the opportunity to save itself from extinction by colonizing other worlds.

In the third ending, a psychotic ORCA-affiliated LYNX with the callsign "Old King" reaches out to Strayed. Old King is the last survivor of an anti-corporate terrorist group that Strayed eradicated, but he blames the corporations for his comrades' deaths and disagrees with ORCA's efforts to minimize bloodshed, so he proposes destroying Cradle 03, a fleet of five Cradle airships with 100 million inhabitants between them. After Old King and Strayed carry out this unprecedented atrocity, Collared deploys a team of its best LYNX to hunt the two mass-murderers down. Old King dies in the battle, but Strayed emerges victorious and goes on to destroy all of the other Cradles, becoming the single most prolific killer in history.

== Reception ==
Reception

Aggregate score
Aggregator	Score	
Aggregator	PS3	Xbox 360
Metacritic	62/100	64/100

Review scores
Publication	Score	
Publication	PS3	Xbox 360
1Up.com	C−	C−
Destructoid	3/10	N/A
Edge	N/A	7/10
Famitsu	29/40	30/40
Game Informer	6.25/10	6.25/10
GameSpot	7/10	7/10
GameZone	7.9/10	7/10
IGN	7.8/10	8/10
PlayStation Official Magazine – UK	5/10	N/A
Official Xbox Magazine (US)	N/A	5.5/10

Armored Core: For Answer received "mixed or average" reviews on both platforms according to the review aggregator website Metacritic. One of the most consistent complaints among reviewers seemed to be the lack of any sort of online community. Kevin Van Ord of GameSpot stated in his review that there were "fewer than a dozen [players on] Xbox Live" when he tried to playtest the game, and that similar attempts to find a game on PlayStation Network yielded "just a single opponent". In Japan, Famitsu gave it a score of 29 out of 40 for the PlayStation 3 version, and one nine and three sevens for the Xbox 360 version, while Famitsu Xbox 360 gave the latter console version 31 out of 40.
