= Armored Core: Last Raven =

2005 video game

- European PlayStation 2 box art
- Developer: FromSoftware
- Publishers: JP: FromSoftware; NA: Agetec; EU: 505 Games
- Director: Dai Takemura
- Producer: Toshifumi Nabeshima
- Designers: Tatsuya Kawate; Yasutaka Kimura; Hidetaka Miyazaki; Wataru Murakami; Tsuyoshi Satoh
- Programmer: Ryoutarou Kishi
- Artists: Makoto Satoh; Yuzo Kojima
- Composers: Yuki Ichiki; Ayako Minami
- Series: Armored Core
- Platforms: PlayStation 2, PlayStation Portable
- Release: PlayStation 2: JP: August 4, 2005; NA: June 13, 2006; EU: October 6, 2006; PlayStation Portable: JP: March 4, 2010; NA: May 3, 2010; EU: July 14, 2010
- Genre: Third-person shooter
- Modes: Single-player, multiplayer

Armored Core: Last Raven is a 2005 mecha-based vehicular combat game developed by FromSoftware. It is part of the Armored Core series and is a direct sequel to Armored Core: Nexus (2004). The game was originally released for the PlayStation 2 and was ported to the PlayStation Portable in 2010. Gameplay remains largely unchanged from the game's predecessors and is centered around piloting a large mech in combat missions for various clients. The game is also notable for being the debut project of future FromSoftware president Hidetaka Miyazaki.

Last Raven concludes the storyline that began with 2002's Armored Core 3. The previously warring corporations have merged into a single organization called The Alliance, while a group of mercenaries called Vertex rise to oppose them. The player takes the role of an unaffiliated mercenary, a Raven, and is given the option of which faction to support, leading to several distinct endings for the first time in the series.

== Gameplay ==
As with previous Armored Core games, players in Last Raven are pilots of mech robots called Armored Cores. Players can take on over 70 missions that play out over a 24-hour period. Completed missions provide the player with credits to spend on parts and weapons, and can influence the availability of subsequent missions. The 24-hour period incrementally moves forward with each mission, and mission choices can dictate the narrative ending the player receives.

Customization is identical to previous entries. Players start the game with 300,000 credits and a basic Armored Core. They can alter the mech with hundreds of parts and weapons, each of which can change the player's gameplay experience. A component damage system allows for parts to be broken individually over the course of a mission, drastically affecting its performance. For example, damaging its legs crippled its movement, while damaging its arms removes its ability to use hand-held weapons.

== Plot ==
In the wake of the now-defunct Navis's failed attempt to control recovered ancient weapons technology at the end of Armored Core: Nexus, the world has been left in tatters. Looking to consolidate power, the remaining corporations have merged into one super-corporation known as "The Alliance". Fed up with corporate rule and oppression, and seeing a newfound threat in The Alliance, a Raven known as Jack-O forms an organization of Ravens known as "Vertex" from the ashes of the fallen Raven's Ark. After rallying a sizable force of fellow Ravens to his cause, Jack-O declares that he will launch an all-out war on the Alliance in 24 hours. Leading the opposing force, a Raven named Evangel has rallied just as many Ravens to the Alliance and is preparing to fight Jack-O head on. Making matters all the more complicated, many Ravens have turned into independent warlords, setting out on their own after the collapse of Raven's Ark.

The player, one of a surviving Raven, begins the game by choosing to take a mission for either Vertex or The Alliance. After completing the mission they are introduced to Evangel, Zinaida, and Jack-O; The major characters of the struggle.

Throughout the story missions, the Raven learns the existence of "Dominant", an extremely gifted pilot who can turn the tide of war. This was a title sought by Evangel, who are driven to become the strongest by any means necessary. In middle game, Evangel betrays The Alliance to infiltrate Vertex from within. Meanwhile, Jack-O puts Zinaida and the Raven through several missions which often pit them against other Ravens. It is revealed that Jack-O was so desperate to find the Dominant that he would go so far as to betray or execute fellow members of Vertex if he felt they didn't measure up.

The struggle reaches its climax at an energy plant, where the Raven learns of a destructive weapon called Pulverizers. Following several attacks by seemingly rogue Pulverizers, it is revealed that an AI called Internecine is controlling them and was responsible for the weapons attack at the end of Armored Core: Nexus. Jack-O reveals to the Raven that the true purpose of this war to find the Dominant that are strong enough to stop the Internecine and the Pulverizers.

== Release ==
Armored Core: Last Raven was initially released in Japan for the PlayStation 2 on August 4, 2005. FromSoftware partnered with Agetec and released a North American version on June 13, 2006. A European version was released in partnership with 505 Games on October 6, 2006.

=== Armored Core: Last Raven Portable ===
Armored Core: Last Raven was re-released for the PlayStation Portable as Armored Core: Last Raven Portable. In Japan, it was released on March 4, 2010. A North American version was later released on May 4, while a European version was released on July 14. The re-release includes widescreen support, an ad hoc multiplayer mode, and the ability to import save data from Armored Core 3: Portable.

== Reception ==
Reception

Aggregate scores
Aggregator	Score	
Aggregator	PS2	PSP
GameRankings	62%	67%
Metacritic	59/100	N/A

Review scores
Publication	Score	
Publication	PS2	PSP
1Up.com	D−	N/A
Famitsu	29/40	26/40
GamePro	4/5	N/A
GameSpot	5.7/10	5/10
GameSpy	3/5	N/A
GameTrailers	6.2/10	N/A
GameZone	7.9/10	N/A
IGN	6.4/10	N/A
Official U.S. PlayStation Magazine	1.5/5	N/A
X-Play	2/5	N/A

Last Raven received "mixed or average reviews" on both platforms according to the review aggregator websites GameRankings and Metacritic. The game was praised for continuing the impressive level of customization that Armored Core has become renown for, yet it was also cited as a daunting barrier to new players. GameSpot's review of the PlayStation 2 version claimed the difficulty of the story and arena missions were too steep, and relied too much on trial and error to customize the player character successfully for the challenges at hand. IGN's review of the same console version was slightly more favorable, but still criticized the game's extreme learning curve, the lack of new graphics, and lack of significant innovations to the game's formula. In Japan, Famitsu gave the game a score of 29 out of 40 for the PS2 version, and 26 out of 40 for the PSP version.
