= Hidetaka Miyazaki =

Japanese video game director (born 1974)

- 宮崎 英高
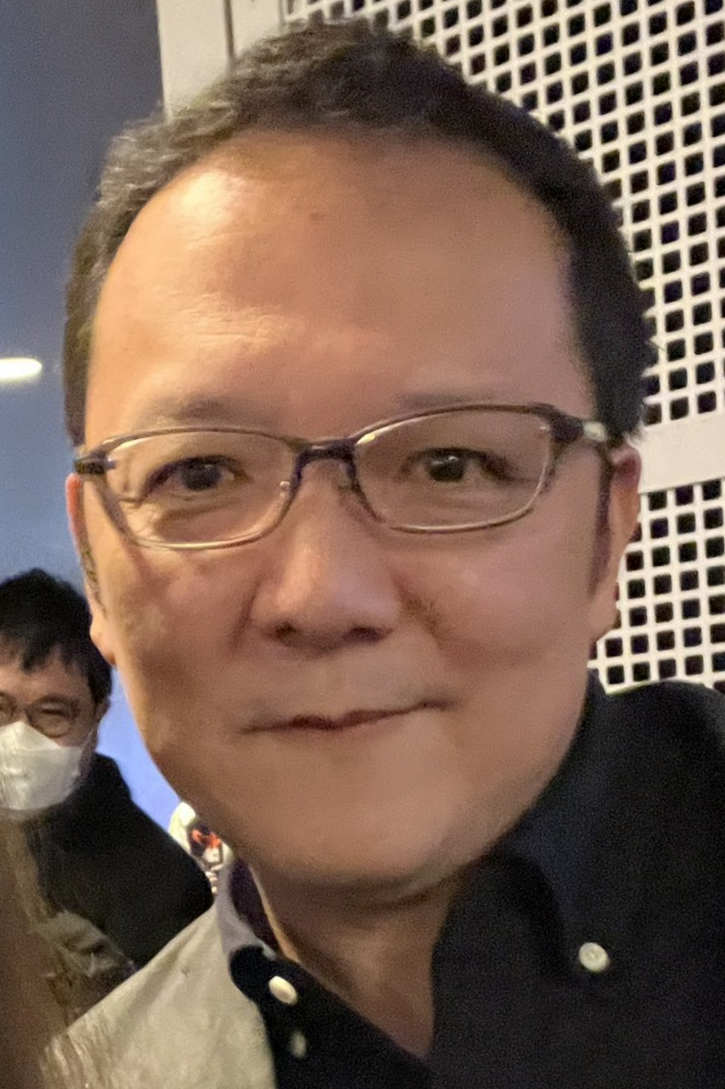
- Miyazaki in 2022
- Born: September 19, 1974 (age 52); Shizuoka, Japan
- Education: Keio University
- Occupations: Video game director; game designer; writer
- Known for: Demon's Souls; Dark Souls; Bloodborne; Sekiro; Elden Ring
- Title: Representative Director and President, FromSoftware
- Term: 2014–present
- Children: 2

Hidetaka Miyazaki (Japanese: 宮崎 英高, Hepburn: Miyazaki Hidetaka; born September 19, 1974) is a Japanese video game director, designer, writer, and president of the game developer FromSoftware. He joined the company in 2004 and was a designer for the Armored Core series before receiving wider recognition for creating the Dark Souls series. Miyazaki was promoted to company president in 2014 and also serves as its representative director. Other similar games he has directed include Demon's Souls, Bloodborne, Sekiro, and Elden Ring.

Miyazaki's influences range across the works of various novelists, manga artists, and game designers such as Fumito Ueda and Yuji Horii. His games often invoke the use of high difficulty and narratives presented largely through flavor text and environmental cues as opposed to dialogue. Regarded as an auteur of video games, Miyazaki's works have been cited as among the greatest in the medium, leading to the creation of the Soulslike subgenre.

== Career ==
Miyazaki was born on September 19, 1974, and grew up in Shizuoka, Japan. He later attended Keio University and graduated with a degree in social science, later getting a job as an account manager for the US-based Oracle Corporation to pay for his sister's college tuition fees. Upon a friend's recommendation, Miyazaki played the 2001 video game Ico, which caused him to want a career change as a game designer. Miyazaki found that few game companies would employ him at age 29 with no experience working in the industry, with one of the few being FromSoftware. He began working there as a planner on Armored Core: Last Raven in 2004, joining the game's development midway through. He later directed Armored Core 4 and its direct sequel, Armored Core: For Answer.

Upon learning about what later became Demon's Souls, Miyazaki became excited at the prospect of a fantasy action role-playing game and offered to help. The project, up until he was assigned to it, was considered a failure by the company. He believed the company's outlook on the game allowed him to take full control of the project as any further failed ideas would not hurt it. Although the game was received negatively at the 2009 Tokyo Game Show and sold far under expectations upon release, it began to pick up after a few months and soon found publishers willing to release the game outside of Japan. Miyazaki was promoted to company president in May 2014 following the success of the game's spiritual successor Dark Souls, which released in 2011. It was considered unprecedented for a person to change careers in Japan and become company president within 10 years.

Miyazaki in 2016

In 2012, Sony Computer Entertainment approached FromSoftware concerning cooperative development on a new game. Miyazaki asked about the possibility of developing a game for eighth-generation consoles, and the concept of Bloodborne developed from there. Even though there were no story or setting connections to FromSoftware's previous games, Miyazaki said that it carried the "DNA" of Demon's Souls and its specific level design. Development ran parallel to that of Dark Souls II, which Miyazaki supervised only as he was unable to direct both games simultaneously. Miyazaki returned to the Dark Souls series as the lead director on Dark Souls III, which released early the following year. After its release, he announced his intentions to personally stop development on the Dark Souls series. His next project was the 2018 virtual reality game Déraciné and the 2019 action-adventure game Sekiro: Shadows Die Twice, with the latter winning several awards. Miyazaki directed the 2022 release Elden Ring, approaching American fantasy writer George R. R. Martin to provide its worldbuilding. The game sold more than 25 million copies and has been cited as among the greatest video games of all time. Miyazaki served as the initial director of Armored Core VI: Fires of Rubicon (2023) before Masaru Yamamura assumed the role.

== Influences and design philosophy ==
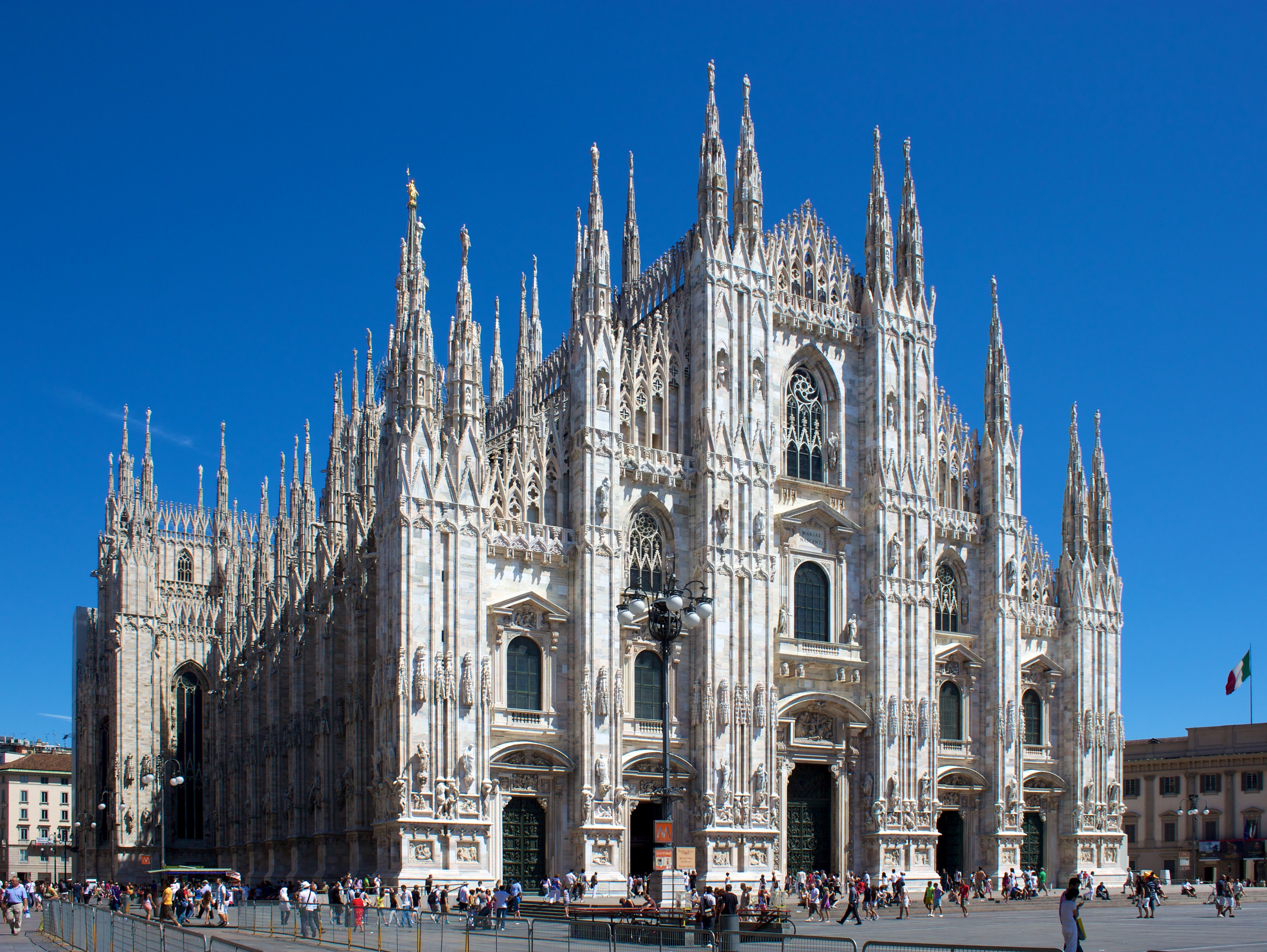
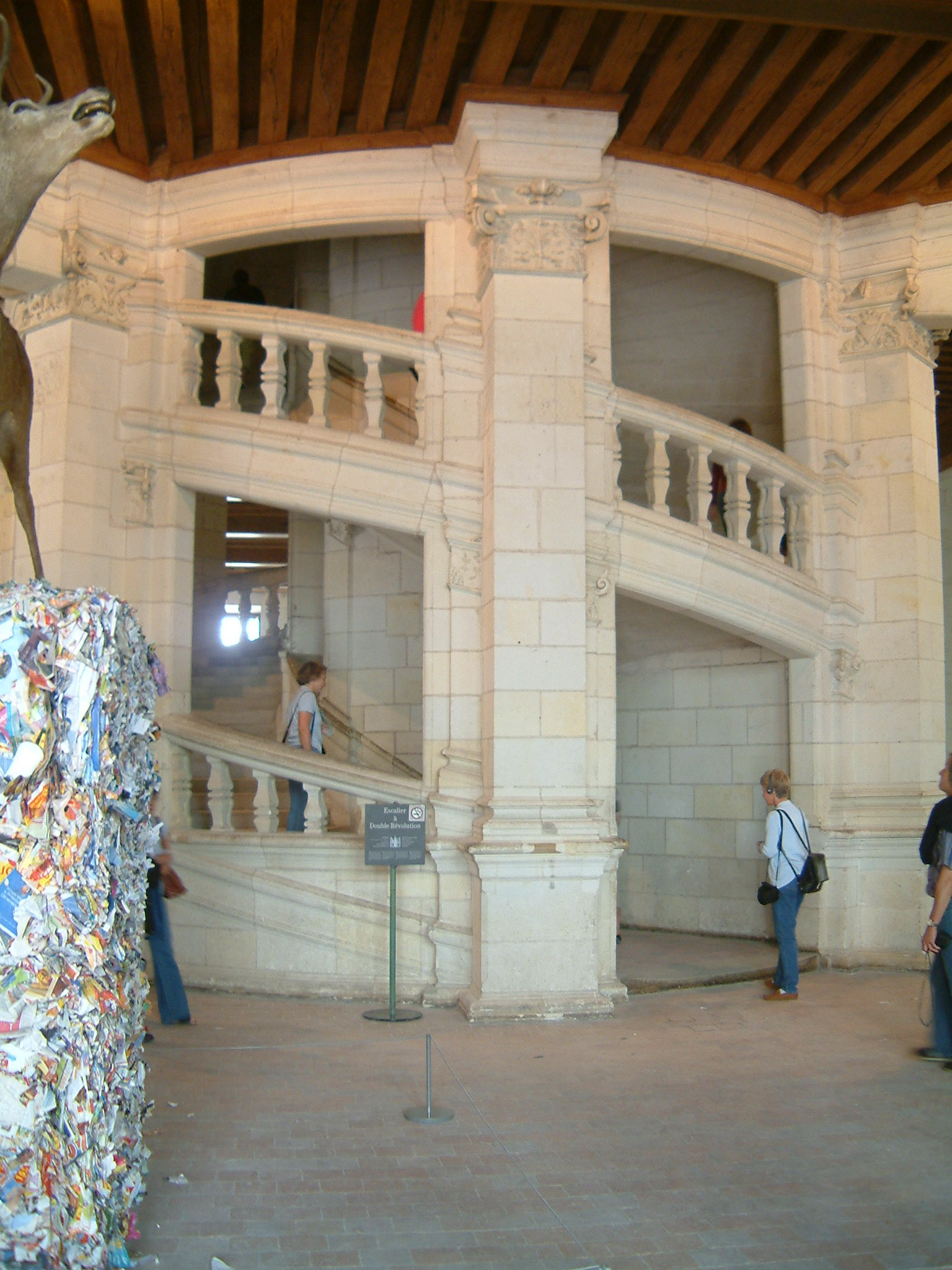
Miyazaki is inspired by architectural designs and often uses them as a part of environmental storytelling in his games. One such example is Anor Londo, a central location in Dark Souls, with parts being modeled after the Milan Cathedral in Italy (top) and Château de Chambord in France (bottom).

Miyazaki was an avid reader as a child despite his parents being unable to afford him many books. He frequently borrowed from his local library, including English language fantasy and science fiction that he did not fully understand, allowing his imagination to fill in the blanks by using the accompanying illustrations. He would later cite that as a major influence on his design philosophy. Miyazaki also played gamebooks and tabletop games such as Steve Jackson's Sorcery!, Dungeons & Dragons, and RuneQuest as his parents restricted him from playing video games until he was old enough to attend university.

Once exposed to video games, Miyazaki became a fan of Ico, the early Dragon Quest games, The Legend of Zelda, and the King's Field series, all of which he cited as influences. He is also a fan of manga such as Berserk, Saint Seiya, JoJo's Bizarre Adventure, and Devilman, as well as the literature of H. P. Lovecraft, Bram Stoker, and George R. R. Martin. Miyazaki is also inspired by architecture, especially of European origin, and often uses it in his games as a way of environmental storytelling. Psychology and sociology have also influenced his design choices.

As the lead creative director on a project, Miyazaki usually writes the majority of the story, dialogue, and text, while having the final say on character, monster, and level designs. The multiplayer mechanics of the Souls series were inspired by his own personal experience of driving up a snowy road as cars ahead began slipping back and were pushed uphill by other people in the area. As Miyazaki was unable to give his thanks before they left the area, he wondered whether the last person in the line had made it to their destination as he was unlikely to ever meet them again. This gave birth to the series' multiplayer systems, with it attempting to emulate that same sense of silent cooperation.

Miyazaki stated that the difficulty of his games have no intention of being that way compared to others. Rather, the difficulty was a part of the process that gives players a sense of accomplishment by "overcoming tremendous odds", while also incentivizing players to experiment more with character builds and weapons. He stated that death in his games is used as a trial and error learning tool, adding that the idea became accepted by the public following the success of Demon's Souls. Miyazaki stated that he does not dislike direct storytelling but prefers players to interpret it for themselves, as they get more value from it when they find out hints of plot from items or side-characters. Many journalists and critics have cited him as an auteur of video games, noting his influential work in Dark Souls and its related games.

== Ludography ==
Year	Title	Role
2005	Armored Core: Last Raven	Designer
2006	Armored Core 4	Director
2008	Armored Core: For Answer	Director
2009	Demon's Souls	Director
2011	Dark Souls	Director, producer
2014	Dark Souls II	Supervisor
2015	Bloodborne	Director
2016	Dark Souls III	Director
2018	Déraciné	Director
2019	Sekiro: Shadows Die Twice	Director
2022	Elden Ring	Director
2027	The Duskbloods	Director

== Awards and honors ==
Miyazaki was awarded the Lifetime Achievement Award at the 2018 Golden Joystick Awards. The award was presented to him by Ian Livingstone and Steve Jackson, two of his inspirations. In 2022, he was the recipient of the Special Award at the CEDEC Awards and the Minister of Economy, Trade, and Industry Award at the Japan Game Awards. In 2023, Time listed Miyazaki as one of the 100 Most Influential People of the year, making him the second game developer to be featured on the list after Shigeru Miyamoto in 2007.

== Personal life ==
Miyazaki disclosed in 2019 that he recently had a son. In 2024, he revealed that he had a daughter.
