= Armored Core V =

2012 video game

- North American cover art
- Developer: FromSoftware
- Publisher: Namco Bandai Games (Note: Released under the Bandai brand): JP: FromSoftware
- Director: Naoyuki Takahashi
- Producer: Toshifumi Nabeshima
- Composer: Kota Hoshino
- Series: Armored Core
- Platforms: PlayStation 3, Xbox 360
- Release: JP: January 26, 2012; NA: March 20, 2012; AU: March 22, 2012; EU: March 23, 2012
- Genres: Simulation, Vehicular combat
- Modes: Single player, multiplayer

Armored Core V is a mecha-based video game developed by FromSoftware and published by Namco Bandai Games for PlayStation 3 and Xbox 360. It is the 14th main installment in the Armored Core series and a return to the more traditional style of gameplay found in the original series of games.

== Gameplay ==
Whereas previous games in the series focused on quick-reflex combat, Armored Core V relies heavily on tactical gameplay. Similar to the first games in the series, Armored Core V requires players to use level geography to their advantage.

Two features are added to the series, with the first being the introduction of "OVERED Weapons" (also known as "Ultimate Weapons" in the overseas release), back-mounted weapon parts which deals enormous damage that can annihilate opponents, but these weapons requires to store all weapons currently equipped in the AC's arms and shoulders to fully utilize, with some requiring to purge an entire arm to use, and can only be used once per mission/match. Usage of "OVERED Weapons", when activated, are dictated via a timer that shows the limits of the AC's equipped generator unit, which was temporarily relieved of all restraints, enabling brief unlimited usage of all Core and Booster functions. The other feature implemented in the game is the ability to freely switch between the player AC's "modes": "Scanning Mode", which allows players to collect information from their surroundings while conserving energy, including enemy units and ACs, as well as providing mission waypoints; and the default "Combat Mode", allowing players to engage in combat with enemy units and ACs using a variety of weapons, while unable to regain energy through combat.

The online mode features five-on-five team-based battles, with each side battling over specific objectives across the map. One member of each team is designated as the Operator and must oversee the entire battle and issue orders to their team.

The online servers for Armored Core V were shut down on March 20, 2014.

== Plot ==
Far in the future, Earth is a polluted, sparsely-inhabited wasteland. The last major bastion of human civilization is The City, a coastal city-state located in North America, to the south of an especially toxic region designated the Contaminated Zone. The City is ruled by the tyrannical Father, who years ago ventured deeper into the Contaminated Zone than anyone had gone before and emerged with advanced weapons technology that he used to seize power. Realizing that The City's limited resources had been stretched to the brink of collapse, Father institutes a harsh policy of apartheid, condemning countless people to the City's underground slums to relieve overcrowding. This alienates Father's lieutenant, Jack Batty, who organizes other dissenters into the Resistance and plots to end Father's rule. When the Resistance launches the First Rebellion, however, Father is prepared and contracts a PMC known only as The Corporation to ruthlessly crush the rebels. Jack Batty is killed in battle by the enigmatic Corporation pilot "Chief". A handful of Resistance members survive and keep the movement alive under the leadership of Jack's adoptive daughter, Frances Batty Curtis.

The player assumes the role of The Mercenary, an Armored Core mech pilot and former City Police officer who helped quell the First Rebellion and personally encountered Jack Batty during the fighting. One year after the First Rebellion's defeat, The Mercenary decides to join the Resistance and helps spearhead the Second Rebellion. With The City's defenders thrown into chaos by the Resistance's guerilla tactics, Resistance foot soldiers manage to storm Father's stronghold and capture him. Unfortunately, at that moment The Corporation carries out an airstrike on the building, killing everyone inside. The Mercenary is forced to fight his way through a Corporation strike force and seemingly defeats Chief in the process.

Meanwhile, The Corporation begins an indiscriminate rampage throughout The City, razing buildings and slaughtering citizens. Unable to stand against The Corporation's overwhelming numbers, the Resistance chooses to abandon The City and bring as many civilians with them as possible. The Mercenary is tasked with defending the evacuation as a rearguard. In the aftermath, the Resistance becomes a host of nomads wandering the wastelands. Chief, implied to be an artificial intelligence, returns to confront The Mercenary one last time in a powerful Armored Core named Exusia. The Mercenary prevails, astonishing Corporation operator Carol Dorry, who cryptically declares that extraordinary individuals like The Mercenary are evidence that humanity may yet be worthy of survival.

== Release ==
The game was released in Japan on January 26, 2012 for both PlayStation 3 and Xbox 360. The game was released by Namco Bandai Games on March 20 in North America, March 22 in Australia, and March 23, 2012, in Europe.

FromSoftware has released a companion application for iOS and Android devices which provides access to a database of in-game parts and weapons to aid in mech customization.

== Reception ==
Reception

Aggregate score
Aggregator	Score	
Aggregator	PS3	Xbox 360
Metacritic	65/100	68/100

Review scores
Publication	Score	
Publication	PS3	Xbox 360
Destructoid	N/A	3.5/10
Edge	N/A	8/10
Eurogamer	8/10	N/A
Famitsu	34/40	34/40
Game Informer	6.5/10	6.5/10
GameRevolution	N/A	4/5
GameSpot	6/10	6/10
GameTrailers	N/A	7/10
GameZone	N/A	7.5/10
IGN	7.5/10	7.5/10
Official Xbox Magazine (US)	N/A	8/10
PlayStation: The Official Magazine	6/10	N/A
The Daily Telegraph	N/A	4/5
Metro	7/10	N/A

The game received "mixed or average reviews" on both platforms according to the review aggregation website Metacritic. In Japan, Famitsu gave it a score of one nine, two eights, and one nine for a total of 34 out of 40.

The Daily Telegraph gave the Xbox 360 version four stars out of five and said it was "a brilliant game that is nonetheless difficult to recommend to everyone", but that "those with an eye for detail and a fair amount of patience will be rewarded with a deep, engaging and entirely idiosyncratic experience. Just don't go in expecting your hand to be held at any point". The Digital Fix gave the PlayStation 3 version seven out of ten and said it was "a very sterile and cold experience" without its multiplayer approach. Metro likewise gave it seven out of ten and said it was "still not the game that will make giant robot sims mainstream, but it does have some innovative ideas in terms of both combat and online play". The Observer gave the game a mixed review and said that it "looks fantastic and is thoroughly entertaining, but its impenetrability may prove too much for all but the faithful".
