= Armored Core 4 =

2006 video game

- PAL cover art
- Developer: FromSoftware
- Publishers: JP: FromSoftware; NA: Sega; EU: 505 Games
- Director: Hidetaka Miyazaki
- Producer: Toshifumi Nabeshima
- Programmer: Kiwamu Takahashi
- Artists: Yuzo Kojima; Makoto Satoh
- Composer: Kota Hoshino
- Series: Armored Core
- Platforms: PlayStation 3, Xbox 360
- Release: PlayStation 3: JP: December 21, 2006; NA: March 20, 2007; EU: June 22, 2007; Xbox 360: NA: March 20, 2007; JP: March 22, 2007; EU: June 22, 2007
- Genre: Vehicular combat
- Modes: Single player, multiplayer

Armored Core 4 is a 2006 mecha-based vehicular combat game developed by FromSoftware for the PlayStation 3 and Xbox 360. The fourth main entry of the Armored Core series, the game serves as a reboot for the franchise and is set in the future where a war has made the nations of Earth devastated and their respective governments have been replaced by corporations. Conflicts soon begin to break out between the corporations, which use massive combat robots, Armored Cores, to fight each other. The player is a Lynx, a name given to pilots of highly advanced NEXT Armored Cores.

Armored Core 4 streamlines many of the features of previous entries while retaining their highly complex customization system. Players are given missions from various clients in return for credits, which they can spend on unlockable parts and weapons. In addition to system link and split-screen multiplayer, players can engage in online battles with up to seven other players. Armored Core 4 is also notable for being Hidetaka Miyazaki's debut as game director.

== Gameplay ==
Like previous entries in the franchise, in Armored Core 4 players pilot mecha units called Armored Cores and take on missions in return for credits. An arena mechanic returns to allow players to fight in 1-on-1 matches against computer-controlled opponents. When starting a new game, players choose from one of several Armored Cores with differing difficulty ratings. A tutorial introduces the basic game concepts prior to beginning the story sections. Once players finish the tutorial, they can begin selecting missions and earning credits for customization.

Gameplay has been sped up and controls have been streamlined to be more accessible than previous entries. Customization, a franchise staple, has retained depth. Hundreds of available parts and weapons can be used to radically change the player's mecha, and each part has a number of stats to detail effectiveness. A change from earlier titles is that many parts are not available at the beginning of this game and instead are unlocked in groups as the game progresses in throughout the story. Parts can also be tuned to subtly alter performances to fit a player's needs.

While system link and split-screen options return, Armored Core 4 is the first entry outside of Japan to have online multiplayer, since the mode's sole implementation in the Japanese version of Armored Core 2: Another Age. Players on the PlayStation Network or Xbox Live can play with up to 7 additional players in various deathmatch modes. On the Xbox 360, Armored Core 4 introduced achievements to the franchise.

== Plot ==
Amid overpopulation, dwindling resources, and civil unrest, six major corporations launch a coordinated global uprising known as the National Dismantlement War, which overthrows all countries on Earth and ushers in a new world order of corporate-enforced peace: the Pax Economica. To efficiently redistribute resources, people are relocated into oppressively managed settlements called colonies and forced into hard labor. However, a technological gap opens between the corporations with the advent of Kojima technology, which utilizes potent and hazardous Kojima Particles as energy. Kojima technology is instrumental in the creation of NEXTs, next-generation Armored Core mechs, and the corporations begin waging a shadow war among themselves for control of it.

Five years into the Pax Economica, the colony of Anatolia enters a financial crisis. Anatolia is one of a handful of colonies that enjoys autonomy from the corporations, but this was solely due to the wealth of the late Professor Jarnefeldt, a leading NEXT engineer. Upon Jarnefeldt's death, most of his staff defected to the corporate research colony Aspina, severing Anatolia's income stream, and leadership of the colony fell to Emil Gustav, one of Jarnefeldt's researchers. To keep Anatolia funded, Emil modifies a veteran Armored Core pilot into a LYNX, gives him a NEXT, and sells his services as a mercenary to corporations that lack their own NEXTs. Fiona Jarnefeldt, the professor's daughter, agrees to act as the pilot's operator. This pilot is the player character, who is also referred to as "Anatolia's Mercenary".

At first, Anatolia's Mercenary is only hired to counter rebel attacks, but he steps into the spotlight by defeating the rebel LYNX Amazigh. He then receives more lucrative and dangerous jobs fighting in skirmishes between rival companies until he is tasked by Global Armaments (GA), one of the six major corporations, with assaulting a GA subsidiary that plans to secede. The mission is successful, but provokes another company named Akva Vit into declaring war on GA. This gives the six major corporations an excuse to openly break the Pax Economica, instigating the LYNX War. Akva Vit gains the backing of the Bernard and Felix Foundation (BFF), Leonemeccanica, and Rayleonard, while GA forges an alliance with Eqbal and Rosenthal.

Throughout the enormously destructive conflict that ensues, the reputation of Anatolia's Mercenary grows as he takes on missions for the GA coalition. Notably, he assassinates BFF's entire leadership by sinking their seaborne headquarters, protects Anatolia from a retaliatory strike by an Akva Vit-developed superweapon, and leads critical operations against the increasingly desperate Rayleonard. The conflict culminates in the dissolution of both Rayleonard and Akva Vit; at the same time that Rayleonard's headquarters is destroyed by Anatolia's Mercenary, Akva Vit's headquarters is coincidentally destroyed by a LYNX from Aspina named Joshua O'Brien. With the LYNX War over, Anatolia finds itself with a comfortable amount of funds. Unfortunately, Joshua carries out a surprise attack on the colony in a prototype NEXT and razes most of it to the ground before he is vanquished. Fiona and Anatolia's Mercenary then decide to leave Anatolia, with Emil unable and unwilling to persuade them to stay.

== Release ==
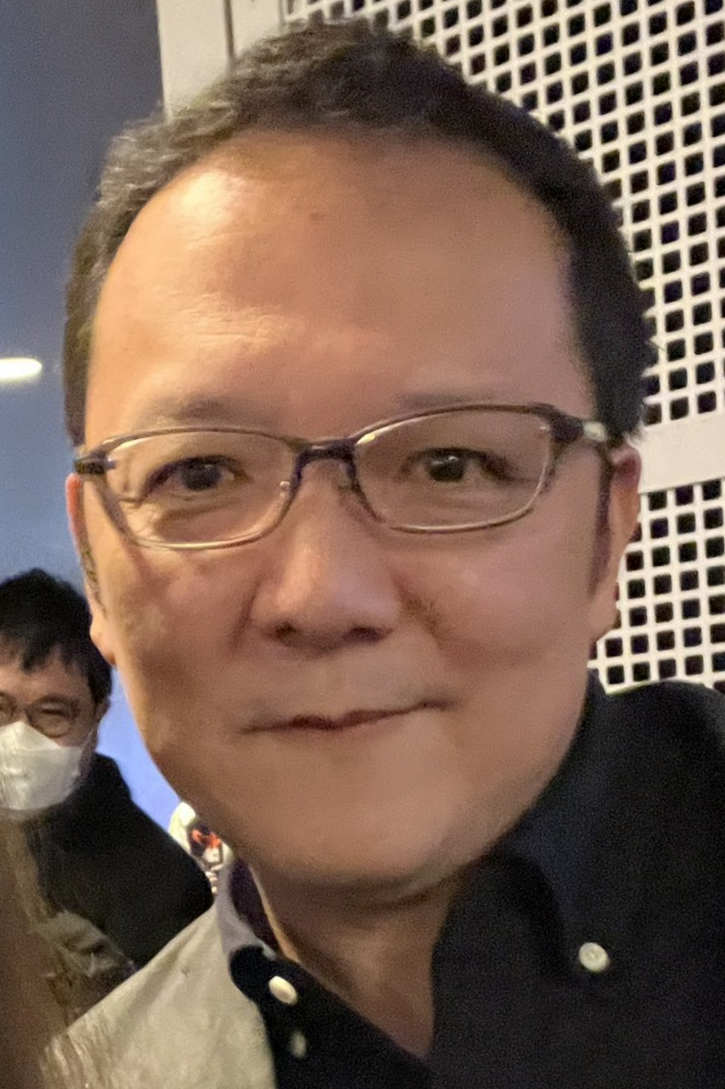
Armored Core 4 was the directorial debut of Hidetaka Miyazaki, who later became president of FromSoftware.

Armored Core 4 was initially released in Japan for the PlayStation 3 on December 21, 2006. FromSoftware partnered with Sega and released a North American version for the PlayStation 3 and Xbox 360 on March 20, 2007, followed by a Japanese release on the Xbox 360 two days later. In Europe, FromSoftware partnered with 505 Games and released the game for the PlayStation 3 and Xbox 360 on June 22, 2007.

== Reception ==
Reception

Aggregate score
Aggregator	Score	
Aggregator	PS3	Xbox 360
Metacritic	65/100	65/100

Review scores
Publication	Score	
Publication	PS3	Xbox 360
Electronic Gaming Monthly	4.83/10	4.83/10
Eurogamer	8/10	N/A
Famitsu	31/40	32/40
Game Informer	6.5/10	6.5/10
GamePro	2.5/5	N/A
GameSpot	7.7/10	7.7/10
GameTrailers	7.3/10	7.3/10
GameZone	7.9/10	6.7/10
IGN	5.9/10	5.9/10
Official Xbox Magazine (US)	N/A	6.5/10
PlayStation: The Official Magazine	7/10	N/A

Armored Core 4 received "mixed or average" reviews on both platforms according to the review aggregator website Metacritic. In Japan, Famitsu gave the PlayStation 3 version a score of 31 out of 40, while Famitsu Xbox 360 gave the Xbox 360 version a score of 32 out of 40.

Reviewers found that Armored Core 4's graphical update was a welcome addition following its increasingly outdated visuals over the last several titles, but noted that there were still issues with the visual presentation of the game. GameSpot's Tom Magrino wrote that after years of "pining for a graphical update" that the "update has now arrived", though he had reservations about the blandness of certain environments and clipping issues with mechs on hilly terrain. Andrew Mellick from 411Mania remarked that the graphics looked impressive "sometimes" and noted that while the game had sections that "really look breathtaking", the game's "level of inspiration didn't keep up the whole game". IGN's Greg Miller was far less impressed by the updated visuals, writing that "what they had didn't work". Bryan Vore of Game Informer opened his review by stating the "biggest surprises" found in Armored Core 4 is the multiplatform status of the title and the "next-gen graphical makeover".

Changes to the core systems were praised by reviewers, with Eurogamer's Dave McCarthy calling it "more accessible than its predecessors". Gamespot's Magrino described the game as a "more visceral experience" and wrote that the streamlined boost mechanics allowed for greater freedom of movement. He praised the faster gameplay and commented that mech customization felt streamlined compared to previous entries, while still offering a considerable amount of depth for those who decided to dig deeper. Conversely, GamePro was unimpressed with the game's mechanics, writing that the missions were too repetitive and frequently broken up by loading screens and that the game was "far more complicated than it needed to be". Game Informer's Vore felt that mech customization was still as inaccessible as it had been previously, writing: "Do we really need to worry about four separate booster classes?"

While the addition of online multiplayer was welcomed, reviewers noted that there wasn't much variety in its offerings. While GameSpot's Magrino acknowledged that online multiplayer was a "much-anticipated feature", he believed that the limited map and game type selection "doesn't offer much to get excited about". Game Informer's Vore agreed, adding that the lack of respawn mechanics severely limited the playtime in multiplayer matches. IGN's Miller was more critical of the map selection, calling them "inadequate arenas".
