= Armored Core: Nexus =

2004 video game

- North American cover art
- Developer: FromSoftware
- Publishers: JP: FromSoftware; NA: Agetec; PAL: Indie Games Productions
- Director: Rintaro Yamada
- Producer: Toshifumi Nabeshima
- Programmer: Ryoutarou Kishi
- Composer: Kota Hoshino
- Series: Armored Core
- Platform: PlayStation 2
- Release: JP: March 18, 2004; NA: September 28, 2004; EU: April 13, 2006; AU: November 1, 2006
- Genre: Third-person shooter
- Modes: Single player, multiplayer

Armored Core: Nexus is a 2004 third-person shooter video game developed by FromSoftware for the PlayStation 2. It is the eighth entry in the Armored Core series and a sequel to 2003's Silent Line: Armored Core. Unlike Silent Line, Nexus is not an expansion but rather a full-fledged sequel.

The game's plot concerns a new corporation called Navis that begins to hoard ancient technology, leading to tensions between it and the existing corporations. As those tensions begin to mount, the player takes on missions through the reorganized Raven's Ark until the corporations break into all-out war. When the corporations begin to activate ancient weapons in desperation, the player takes on more critical tasks of attempting to stop the weapons before they destroy everything on the planet.

Very little has changed from Armored Core's primary gameplay mechanics in Nexus. Players pilot mechs, take on missions, and earn money that they can use to customize their mech units. New additions to the game include dual analog stick support and a LAN multiplayer mode.

== Gameplay ==
The mechanics of Armored Core: Nexus continues with many of the franchise's conventions. Players pilot large mech robots called Armored Cores and are hired as mercenaries for objective-based missions. Armored Cores are highly modular and can be customized with hundreds of parts and items. Money is earned through missions and can be used to purchase customization options, but any expenses incurred through a mission are automatically deducted from the player's income.

Mouse support allows for players to create emblems and navigate menus. The control scheme of Nexus has been updated to include support for dual analog sticks, a first for the franchise.

Nexus is split into two discs. The first, Evolution, is the main game and story sequel to Silent Line. The second disc, Revolution, contains updated missions from earlier titles in the franchise that can be played using Armored Cores from Nexus.

Like previous games, Nexus includes several multiplayer options. Split-screen modes and I-Link multiplayer connectivity return, allowing for 2 player head-to-head combat. A new addition is a LAN multiplayer mode that allows up to 4 players to connect and fight each other.

== Plot ==
55 years after the incident at the Silent Line, corporate warfare is on the verge of breaking out once more between the four largest corporations: Mirage, Crest, Kisaragi, and the newly founded Navis. An ill-equipped bureaucracy called the Organization for Administrating Enterprise claims to police the corporations, but does little in practice to stop the escalation of conflict between them. Global Cortex, the organization that employed Armored Core pilots called Ravens, has been replaced with a successor organization called Raven's Ark.

As the corporations expand across the planet, Navis begins to hoard ancient technology and gains the attention of Mirage, which leads to an attempt by Mirage to use the OAE to force Navis into sharing the technology. Navis instead withdraws from the OAE and severs its partnership with Kisaragi to develop a secret alliance with Crest. Tensions from these events lead to all-out war between the corporations, which comes to a climax as Crest betrays their smaller ally and destroys the city that Navis is based in. Despite Crest withdrawing from the war, Mirage begins to attack Navis, leading the desperate company to activate an ancient weapon that proves to be uncontrollable. Despite the player's defeat of the weapon, the Kisaragi corporation accidentally activated a separate weapons system that begins to destroy everything it can.

== Release ==
Armored Core: Nexus was initially released in Japan on March 18, 2004. FromSoftware partnered with Agetec for its international versions, with the game releasing in North America on September 28, 2004, Europe on April 13, 2006, and in Australia on November 1, 2006.

== Reception ==
Reception

Aggregate score
| Aggregator | Score |
|---|---|
| Metacritic | 73/100 |

Review scores
| Publication | Score |
|---|---|
| Edge | 8/10 |
| Electronic Gaming Monthly | 5.67/10 |
| Famitsu | 32/40 |
| Game Informer | 7.25/10 |
| GamePro | 3.5/5 |
| GameSpot | 7.7/10 |
| IGN | 7.5/10 |
| PlayStation Official Magazine – UK | 5/10 |
| Official U.S. PlayStation Magazine | 2/5 |
| PlayStation: The Official Magazine | 7.5/10 |

The game received "average" reviews according to the review aggregation website Metacritic. In Japan, Famitsu gave it a score of two eights, one nine, and one seven for a total of 32 out of 40.

The addition of dual analog stick support was welcomed by reviewers, with Game Informer's Matt Miller calling it "long-needed". Customization was praised as being "easier than before" by GamePro and the game's "real selling point" by IGN.

Gameplay had a more mixed reaction. Game Informer wrote that the dynamic plot that took into account player losses and victories was "a mixed blessing". IGN called targeting systems "imprecise and purposefully infuriating". However, GameSpot disagreed, writing that gameplay changes and improvements "make Nexus more difficult and more interesting than its predecessors, which is great".

Critics complained that the series remained inaccessible to newcomers and did little to change its formula. GamePro's Rice Burner wrote that the lack of information given to new players to acclimate them to the game was "unfortunate", and believed that newcomers would "find themselves in impossible situations". IGN's Ivan Sulic was less forgiving about the franchise's iterative ritual, stating "it's practically eight games of enough already".
