= Déraciné =

2018 video game

- Promotional artwork
- Developer: FromSoftware (Note: Development assistance by Japan Studio.)
- Publisher: Sony Interactive Entertainment
- Directors: Hidetaka Miyazaki; Shigeto Hirai; Takaaki Yamagishi
- Producers: Yuzo Kojima; Masaaki Yamagiwa; Teruyuki Toriyama
- Programmer: Jun Ito
- Artists: Kozo Maeda; Taisei Nakagaki; Yuki Nakamura
- Composers: Tsukasa Saitoh; Shoi Miyazawa; Yuka Kitamura
- Engine: Unreal Engine 4
- Platform: PlayStation 4
- Release: WW: November 6, 2018; JP: November 8, 2018
- Genre: Graphic adventure
- Mode: Single-player

Déraciné is a 2018 adventure game developed by FromSoftware and published by Sony Interactive Entertainment for the PlayStation 4. The player takes the role of a fairy in an isolated boarding school who attempts to solve a mystery in virtual reality via the PlayStation VR headset. The game's development was led by Hidetaka Miyazaki, better known for creating the Dark Souls series. Déraciné was met with mixed reception. The game's title is French for "uprooted".

== Plot ==
The Faerie wakes up in an orphanage and learns from a mysterious voice that they must acquire a red ring on their hand that stores life energy, and a blue ring on their left that manipulates time. The Faerie then meets a girl named Yuliya, who requests that the Faerie convince the orphanage's other children that the Faerie exists. The Faerie manipulates artifacts and objects to convince the other children. Once the inhabitants of the orphanage are convinced, the Headmaster makes a request of the Faerie. Holding out a golden wand, he asks the Faerie to use his remaining time to prevent the incident that wounded Rozsa's leg. The Faerie does so, fixing Rozsa's leg in the present. Happy to have a friendly Faerie at their boarding school, the children begin working on various ways to honor the being. This culminates in a concert in which the Faerie brings Nils' pet mouse back from the dead in order to repair the music box in the music hall.

Afterward, the Faerie learns that it has actually been talking to a ghost of Yuliya, and the other children, now inspired by the Faerie's ability to bring back the dead, have made a plan to bring back Yuliya. Yuliya's ghost informs the Faerie that the children have wandered into the forest in search of something large enough to revive Yuliya, and pleads for the Faerie to save them. The Faerie follows the children's trail and discovers that it is too late to prevent an evil faerie from sucking their life energy. Lorinc survives and decides to sacrifice himself so the Faerie can go back and prevent their doomed excursion. The Faerie travels in time, attempting to dissuade the children from entering the forest, but finds them unconvinced. The Faerie travels further back to revive Yuliya, discovering the body of another caretaker, Margareta, who committed suicide after her daughter Alexis died. Taking the red ring from Margareta's corpse, the Faerie places it on Yuliya's. This quickly goes poorly as she transforms into an evil faerie herself, stealing the life force of the children and Headmaster. A remorseful Yuliya allows the Faerie to use the life force she has accumulated for the Faerie to travel to the night of Yuliya's death.

The Faerie learns the Headmaster and Margareta were scholars from the city of Rohn studying faeries, but the city burned down and evil faeries stole life force through the land. The Headmaster and Margareta set up the orphanage to continue their experiment. Concluding that humans with regrets will become evil, and that a newborn is the perfect candidate, they attempted to turn Alexis into a faerie, resulting in her death. The Faerie realizes that it is the faerie version of Alexis, summoned when Yuliya stole the Headmaster's golden wand and wished to see Alexis again, inadvertently trading her own life force.

Ultimately, history will prove to repeat itself unless the Faerie decides to return Yuliya's life to her instead of taking the ring for itself. Yuliya comes to the realization of how special her own life is, and resolves to live her life to the fullest. However, this means the Faerie sacrifices its own ability to interact with the world, slowly fading away into nothing. Yuliya lives happily with her friends and the Headmaster.

== Development ==
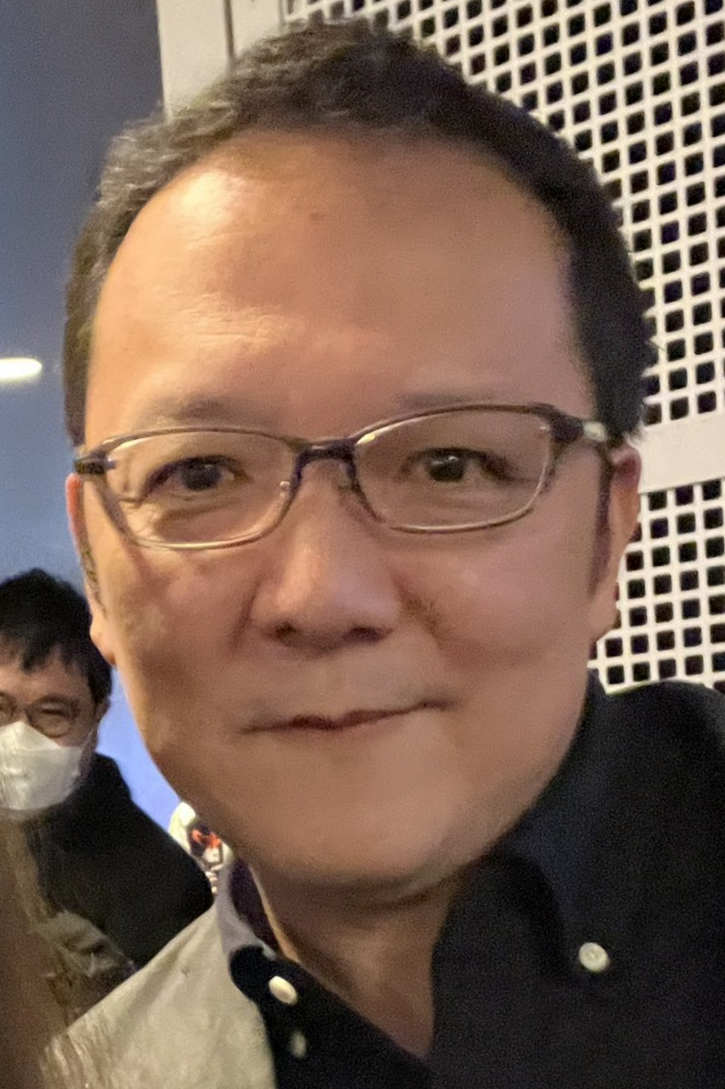
Hidetaka Miyazaki was the lead director of Déraciné.

Déraciné is a first-person adventure game developed for virtual reality (VR) by FromSoftware, with assistance from Japan Studio, and published by Sony Interactive Entertainment for the PlayStation 4 via its PlayStation VR add-on peripheral. It was directed by Hidetaka Miyazaki, better known for creating the Dark Souls series of action role-playing games, with the goal to recreate the first-person adventure game genre in VR. Miyazaki sought to explore the theme of "existence versus non-existence," which he felt would only be possible via VR. Due to the change in perspective, the development team placed more focus on facial expressions in comparison to previous FromSoftware games, which presented a challenge. Déraciné was developed using Unreal Engine.

== Reception ==
Reception

Aggregate score
Aggregator	Score
Metacritic	68/100

Review scores
Publication	Score
Eurogamer	7/10
Famitsu	35/40
Game Informer	7/10
GameSpot	5/10
IGN	7.8/10
PlayStation Official Magazine – UK	7/10

Déraciné received mixed reviews from critics according to review aggregator website Metacritic. It debuted at number thirteen on the Japanese charts, selling 3,086 copies in its first week.
