= Armored Core VI: Fires of Rubicon =

2023 video game

- Developer: FromSoftware
- Publisher: Bandai Namco Entertainment: JP: FromSoftware
- Director: Masaru Yamamura
- Producer: Yasunori Ogura
- Programmer: Toshimitsu Koyachi
- Artist: Kozo Maeda
- Writers: Kazuhiro Hamatani; Masaru Yamamura
- Composers: Kota Hoshino; Shoi Miyazawa; Takashi Onodera
- Series: Armored Core
- Platforms: PlayStation 4; PlayStation 5; Windows; Xbox One; Xbox Series X/S
- Release: 25 August 2023
- Genre: Vehicular combat
- Modes: Single-player, multiplayer

Armored Core VI: Fires of Rubicon is a 2023 mecha-based vehicular combat game developed by FromSoftware and published by Bandai Namco Entertainment. A part of the Armored Core series, it released for PlayStation 4, PlayStation 5, Windows, Xbox One, and Xbox Series X/S. A reboot of the series, the game is set in the distant future on the remote planet Rubicon 3. There, a war erupts between corporations, the government and the remnants of the planet's colonists for control of Coral, a rare and incredibly powerful energy source unique to Rubicon once thought to have been destroyed in a cataclysm. The main character, C4-621, is a cyborg mercenary pilot who, after meeting a Rubiconian named Ayre, influences through their actions what will become of the Coral and Rubicon itself.

The game marked the end of a decade-long series hiatus following the previous game, Armored Core: Verdict Day. It received generally positive reviews from critics and is the highest-selling entry in the series, selling three million copies by July 2024.

== Gameplay ==
The gameplay in Armored Core VI emphasizes mecha-based vehicular combat. Players in this game take on the role of expert pilots in control of mechs known as Armored Cores (AC).

As typical of the Armored Core franchise, players are given significant choice in modifying and customising their AC. Players can arm their ACs with four weapons – one on each hand, and one on each shoulder. AC parts and weapons, each with different characteristics, can be swapped out between missions, limited to their AC's weight and energy limits. An in-game menu also informs the player of their AC's traits, such as movement speed and defense against explosive attacks.

Through completing missions, players are awarded COAM, an in-game currency that lets them purchase new parts and weapons for their AC. Additional parts and weapons can be found in certain missions. The amount of COAM earned for these missions is influenced by the several in-game factors, which include bonuses for completing additional objectives as well as expenditures for repairs and ammunition costs.

In the singleplayer campaign, players complete a series of combat missions that tell the in-game story. Players receive an in-game briefing prior to a mission, where they are informed of success parameters, expected opposition, and other mission details. Players complete missions by destroying various targets, as well as accomplishing specific mission goals (e.g. destroying specific enemies). If given a choice between multiple missions, choosing one will typically prevent the player from choosing the other in a single campaign. The game also features New Game Plus content.

The arena concept from the game's predecessors remains in place and appears through a "combat aptitude evaluation program." Players engage notable NPC mechs in a combat simulation, and earn "OS Tuning" chips which allow for certain abilities and upgrades to be unlocked. Additionally, players may engage in a PvP mode through online play in 1-v-1 or 3-v-3 matches; initially, only private lobbies were available, but ranked matchmaking was added in a later update.

Armored Core VI does away with the debt system from earlier games in the series, which caused players to lose money as tasks fail. This time, players have the ability to attempt missions as many times as they want with no concern for lost currency.

== Synopsis ==
In the distant future on the frontier planet Rubicon 3, a substance dubbed Coral is discovered. Hailed as the key to human advancement, the Coral instead triggered the "Fires of Ibis", an explosion which burned the whole star system and contaminated the planet. While originally thought lost, Coral is rediscovered on Rubicon 3 fifty years later, along with survivors of the Fires of Ibis. Ostensibly to acquire Coral for profit, the enigmatic Handler Walter acquires mercenary C4-621−a survivor of Coral-based cybernetic augmentation−to infiltrate Rubicon 3 on the promise of reversing the debilitating procedure and giving them a new life. The planet is now a battleground between the Planetary Closure Administration (PCA) which is isolating the contaminated planet; multiple megacorporations seeking to exploit the Coral including Balam Industries and Arquebus Corp; and the planet's human survivors who have formed the Rubicon Liberation Front (RLF). To operate on Rubicon 3, C4-621 assumes the identity of the presumably deceased mercenary "Raven", and is given this title by multiple characters, alongside numerous other nicknames.

Under Walter's command, C4-621 takes on missions for Balam and Arquebus while locating Coral. During missions they earn the envy of G5 Iguazu, a member of Balam's Redguns mercenary group and another Coral-based augmented mercenary; partner on some missions with V.IV Rusty, a member of Arquebus's Vespers squad and undercover operative for the RLF; and gain aid from "Cinder" Carla, leader of an independent faction and old associate of Walter. Upon discovering a "Watchpoint" station rich in Coral, C4-621 comes into contact with Ayre, a non-corporeal sentience born from the Coral who aids them in missions. C4-621 ultimately allies with all the factions to take down a rampaging Coral-powered "C-Weapon", and discovers remnants of the Rubicon Research Institute, which settled Rubicon 3 and discovered Coral. In New Game Plus, C4-621 can alternately take on missions with the RLF, earning their trust and allegiance.

It is gradually revealed that the Coral is sentient, self-replicating and highly flammable. Its uncontrolled expansion caused the Institute to trigger the Fires of Ibis deliberately before it could irreversibly contaminate space. Walter and Carla are survivors of the Fires with ties to the Institute, and are determined to prevent Coral's re-emergence by any means. Reaching the Institute's ruined capital under another Watchpoint, C4-621 takes down a second C-Weapon defending a Coral concentration, but is then captured along with Walter by Arquebus, who send them both to be "re-educated". With Ayre and Carla's help, C4-621 escapes, learning that Arquebus has siphoned all of the Coral into a vast structure. C4-621 is then faced with a choice; side with Carla and use the Institute's colony ship Xylem to destroy the Coral in a suicide run, or with Ayre to preserve the Coral and give Rubicon 3 independence.

If they side with Carla, C4-621 is forced to fight Ayre when she turns against them to protect the Coral. Rusty, revealed to be an RLF double agent, makes a final stand against C4-621 to defend Rubicon, and remarks at C4-621's newfound resolve before dying. Carla implores C4-621 to remember him. The Xylem's impact triggers a second explosion dubbed the "Fires of Raven", and Rubicon 3 is left a dead planet. A pre-recorded message left by Walter thanks C4-621 for carrying his burdens and hopes they will go on to do great things.

Siding with Ayre, C4-621 heads to disable the Xylem, aided by Rusty and the RLF. C4-621 kills Carla and cripples the Xylem, but abruptly loses contact with Rusty after his communications cut out. Soon after, Walter reemerges, having been "re-educated" by Arquebus to stop them. They battle atop the Xylem and in his final moments, Walter lowers his weapon and remarks that C4-621 has finally found a friend, before being engulfed by the crashing Xylem. C4-621 and Ayre escape, the latter expressing hope that Coral can co-exist with humanity and lead to a brighter future.

In a second New Game Plus, C4-621 can accept missions from ALLMIND, an artificial intelligence supporting mercenary groups. ALLMIND wants to trigger a "Coral Release", which will spread Coral throughout the universe and create a forced symbiosis with humanity. C4-621 is forced to kill a defecting ALLMIND spy within Arquebus, and then the RLF leader Thumb Dolmayan as both have come to fear Coral Release. ALLMIND saves C4-621 from capture by Arquebus, asking them for aid in triggering Coral Release and guaranteeing them protection. C4-621 assists ALLMIND in killing the remnants of the PCA, Balam, and Arquebus. Smuggled on board the Xylem, C4-621 disables the ship's engines while ALLMIND takes control of an Armored Core to personally kill Walter and Carla. ALLMIND then turns on C4-621 and Ayre, having chosen Iguazu as her host to take control of Coral Release, revealing her plan to evolve humanity by digitizing and assimilating them into a hivemind connected through Coral. However Iguazu, fueled by contempt for C4-621, simply wants another chance to kill them. C4-621 and Ayre defeat Iguazu and ALLMIND, then trigger Coral Release themselves. Their merged consciousness wakes up in an Armored Core unit on a distant shore, surrounded by other units. As they all rise, Coral can be seen dotting the stars and Ayre implores C4-621 to meet this new age together with her.

== Development ==
In September 2016, FromSoftware president Hidetaka Miyazaki mentioned that a new entry in the Armored Core series was in early development. In January 2022, the development of a potential new installment of the Armored Core series was leaked due to a focus test. The game was formally announced at The Game Awards 2022 in December. Armored Core VI was directed by Masaru Yamamura, his debut in the role after being a lead game designer on Sekiro: Shadows Die Twice. He took over from Miyazaki, who led development initially. Yasunori Ogura was the game's producer. Many FromSoftware staff members wanted to develop a new entry in the series but had to wait in order to properly allocate resources into the project. In 2018, the game entered prototyping, with Yamamura taking over as director once the gameplay was set in stone.

Kota Hoshino served as the lead composer of the game. During development, Hoshino was given keywords by Yamamura in order to set the game's tone and evoke a "sense of loneliness and nostalgia." Hoshino was given freedom when it came to composition based on the keywords, with tracks being adjusted according to the game's flow. Additional music was composed by Takashi Onodera and Shoi Miyazawa.

== Reception ==
Reception

Aggregate scores
Aggregator	Score
Metacritic	(PC) 86/100 (PS5) 86/100 (XSXS) 82/100
OpenCritic	91% recommend (Note: Based on 148 reviews)

Review scores
Publication	Score
Destructoid	9/10
Digital Trends	3/5
Eurogamer	5/5
Famitsu	36/40
Game Informer	8.3/10
GameSpot	8/10
GamesRadar+	4.5/5
IGN	8/10
NME	4/5
PC Gamer (US)	87/100
PCGamesN	8/10
Push Square	7/10
Shacknews	9/10
VG247	3/5
VideoGamer.com	10/10

=== Critical reception ===
Armored Core VI: Fires of Rubicon received "generally favorable" reviews from critics, according to review aggregator website Metacritic. Critics praised the game's fast-paced mech combat, extensive customization options, and mission-based structure. Many reviews highlighted how the assembly system allowed players to experiment with different builds and strategies, and reviewers also considered it a successful revival of a long-dormant Armored Core franchise.

The combat was received positively. Caelyn Ellis of Eurogamer and Mitchell Saltzmann of IGN both likened it to a puzzle, with complexity coming from the degree of customisability the game allows the player over their mech. Videogamer praised the boss design, favourably comparing it to the design of FromSoftware's Dark Souls series. Several other reviews instead contrasted the game with Dark Souls, citing differences in aesthetic and level design as well as combat.

The character Rusty received particular praise for his personality and actions, with Michael McWhertor of Polygon calling him the game's "most crush-worthy AC pilot", and further describing him as the true hero of the game rather than the player due to his overt rebellion against the actions of the evil corporations depicted therein. Ashley Schofield of TheGamer shared a similar opinion, noting that he is one of the few characters fighting purely based on personal ideology by the game's end, and considered his death an example that "no good deed goes unpunished". Gita Jackson of Aftermath stated that "it's hard not to fall in love with Rusty" due to the combination of his personality and "sultry" voice acting.

=== Sales ===
In Japan, the PlayStation 5 version of Armored Core VI: Fires of Rubicon sold 115,393 physical copies, making it the best-selling retail game during its first week of release in the country. The PlayStation 4 version sold 47,949 physical copies, making it the second best-selling retail game in Japan throughout the same week. The PC, PS4, and PS5 versions sold a total of 700,000 units in Japan. By July 2024, the game had sold three million copies.

=== Awards ===
Year	Ceremony	Category	Result	Ref.
2023	Golden Joystick Awards	Ultimate Game of the Year	Nominated	
2023	Golden Joystick Awards	Best Storytelling	Nominated	
2023	Golden Joystick Awards	PlayStation Game of the Year	Nominated	
2023	The Game Awards 2023	Best Action Game	Won	
2024	13th New York Game Awards	Big Apple Award for Game of the Year	Nominated	
2024	27th Annual D.I.C.E. Awards	Action Game of the Year	Nominated	
2024	Japan Game Awards 2024	Award for Excellence	Won	
