= Armored Core 2 =

2000 video game

- European cover art
- Developer: FromSoftware
- Publishers: JP: FromSoftware; NA: Agetec; EU: Ubi Soft, Crave Entertainment
- Producer: Kenichiro Tsukuda
- Artist: Shōji Kawamori
- Composers: Tsukasa Saitoh; Yuji Kanda; Ikuya Ichinohe; Keiichiro Segawa; Kota Hoshino
- Series: Armored Core
- Platform: PlayStation 2
- Release: JP: August 3, 2000; NA: October 26, 2000; EU: January 19, 2001
- Genre: Third-person shooter
- Modes: Single player, multiplayer

Armored Core 2 is a 2000 third-person shooter mecha video game developed by FromSoftware for the PlayStation 2. It is the fourth entry in the Armored Core series and an indirect sequel to Armored Core: Master of Arena. In North America, Armored Core 2 was a launch title for the PlayStation 2. A direct sequel, Armored Core 2: Another Age, was released in 2001 for the PlayStation 2.

The story takes place almost 70 years after Master of Arena. Following the colonization of Mars, a powerful organization called the Frighteners overthrows the government at the behest of their leader, the enigmatic Leos Klein. The player is a mercenary who is tasked with dismantling the Frighteners and defeating Klein.

Armored Core 2's gameplay is largely similar to that of its predecessors. Players take control of powerful machines called Armored Cores and engage in dangerous missions or fight in the Arena against other pilots. Like earlier games, Armored Core 2 features a local multiplayer mode that includes a console linking feature and allows two players to fight each other with their own custom Armored Core.

== Gameplay ==
The player fights Eight-Ball at Malea Base.

Armored Core 2 is a third-person shooter in which players pilot machines called Armored Cores. These Cores can be fully customized with different parts, weapons, and paint schemes to create a unique loadout. Players must balance their loadout to ensure that they aren't too heavy or are using too much power. In order to purchase more parts, players must earn credits through missions or the Arena.

Missions are largely unchanged from the original Armored Core. Players are given an objective to complete in open levels and can complete the objective however they choose. Enemies can consist of automated machines called MTs, mysterious unmanned weapons called Disorders, or other Armored Core pilots. Upon completion, repair and ammunition costs are deducted from the reward payout. If a player fails a mission, those costs are directly deducted from their overall balance.

The Arena is a largely freeform gamemode that the player can enter at any time. At the start of the game, the player is ranked at the bottom of a 50-person ladder and must fight their way to the top. Some ranked pilots can be killed over the course of the story missions and removed from the ladder. As players win, they can earn credits or parts for their victories that can be used in both the Arena and story missions.

In addition to missions and the Arena, a local multiplayer mode allows players to fight their friends via split screen or console linking with a Sony I-link Fire Wire cable. While split screen only requires one copy of the game, console linking requires two copies, along with two separate consoles and two televisions. Console linking allows for a larger number of location options in the game mode. Players with existing saves can load their custom Armored Core into these multiplayer matches.

== Plot ==
67 years after Master of Arena, Earth's second largest corporation, Zio Matrix, acquires plans for a research project on Mars, dating back before the Great Destruction. Using these plans, Zio Matrix sends a research team to Mars to begin the Terraforming Project, which causes the Martian surface and atmosphere to approximate that of Earth. Other corporations such as Emeraude - Zio Matrix 's equal and rival - and Balena - a smaller corporation - learn of the project and quickly follow Zio Matrix, bringing with them the competitive environment that existed on Earth, and the employ of the mercenaries of Nerves Concord.

The Earth Government - via the Nerves Concord - deploys Large Scale Enterprises of the Central Committee(LCC for short) as its puppet corporation to establish their control over Mars's economy. Meanwhile, the player character takes missions from all the corporations, gradually rising in fame due to his efficiency.

As the three companies' war comes to a close, Zio Matrix attempts a coup against the government, which has regained control through its elite mercenary team, The Frighteners, led by Leos Klein, using Disorder Units - weapons designed by an Ancient Martian civilisation, and Phobos - a war satellite. But in the chaos that ensues, the Frighteners turn on the government, assassinate its leader, and take control of the powerful Martian technology. Klein, revealed to be the legendary "Nine-Breaker" that defeated Nine-Ball(possibly the player character from Master of Arena), kept alive by cybernetic enhancements, witnessed firsthand how unchecked ambition and warfare destroyed his homeland and claimed countless lives. He saw corporate and military strife replicate the same patterns on Mars, and wished for Ravens to have their freedom - not to be used by governments. He calls for other Ravens to join in his insurrection, declaring war against the government and promising the Ravens a Raven state made by and for Ravens. The government scrambles to employ all remaining Ravens who refused to join his insurrection. The player character is tasked with confronting them and saving the human populace of Mars.

== Release ==
Armored Core 2 was initially released in Japan for the on August 3, 2000. FromSoftware partnered with Agetec and released a North American version on October 26 the same year as a launch title for the PlayStation 2. A European version was released in partnership with Ubisoft on January 19, 2001.

== Reception ==
Reception

Aggregate score
Aggregator	Score
Metacritic	78/100

Review scores
Publication	Score
AllGame	3.5/5
CNET Gamecenter	8/10
Edge	8/10
Electronic Gaming Monthly	5.83/10 (Note: Two critics of Electronic Gaming Monthly gave the game each a score of 6/10, and the other gave it 5.5/10.)
Famitsu	33/40
Game Informer	9/10
GameFan	(MVS) 88% 83% (Note: In GameFan's viewpoint of the game, three critics gave it each a score of 92, 89, and 68.)
GamePro	4.5/5
GameRevolution	A−
GameSpot	7.8/10
GameSpy	77%
IGN	8/10
Next Generation	4/5
Official U.S. PlayStation Magazine	3/5

The game received "generally favorable reviews" according to the review aggregation website Metacritic. NextGen's Chet Barber wrote that the game was "Definitely one of the best titles currently available for PS2. Certainly worth owning, unless you're turned off by the complex mech-building system or you hate mechs entirely." In Japan, Famitsu gave it a score of 33 out of 40.

Reviewers praised the graphical quality of Armored Core 2. Game Informer's Andrew Reiner called the lighting effects and environments "absolutely incredible." GamePro's Cheat Monkey wrote that "the graphics bring the AC world to life." GameRevolution's Shawn Sanders found the "particle effects [to be] impressive". AllGame's Jon Thompson, on the other hand, didn't find the graphics to be as groundbreaking as his peers, writing that "it still looks acceptable."

Gameplay had mixed responses. GameSpot's Frank Provo called it the game's "true beauty." IGN's David Smith wrote that the "progression curve occasionally leaps in bizarre directions at times." PlanetPS2's Jessyel Gonzalez agreed with Smith's complaints, noting that the game "demand[s] every single bit of patience in your mind to master the game."

Criticism was directed at the control scheme, with Smith noting that the game "has dragged its old control scheme into the new generation with it, and we gamers are much poorer for it." Thompson added: "The mechs are not as responsive as they should be, the targeting is oversensitive, and on the whole, the process of combat sometimes becomes more of a hassle than a good time."
