= Armored Core: Project Phantasma =

1997 video game

- North American cover art
- Developer: FromSoftware
- Publishers: JP: FromSoftware; NA: ASCII Entertainment
- Producer: Yasuyoshi Karasawa
- Programmer: Eiichi Hasegawa
- Artist: Shōji Kawamori
- Series: Armored Core
- Platforms: PlayStation, PlayStation 3
- Release: PlayStation: JP: December 4, 1997; NA: October 7, 1998; PlayStation 3: JP: September 27, 2007
- Genre: Third-person shooter
- Modes: Single-player, multiplayer

Armored Core: Project Phantasma is a 1997 third-person shooter mecha video game developed and published by FromSoftware for the PlayStation. Project Phantasma is the second entry in the Armored Core series and a prequel to the original Armored Core. The game was not released in Europe.

The story is set two years before the original Armored Core and follows the player's investigation of the mysterious Amber Crown complex, a testing ground for the shadowy Doomsday Organization and their dangerous research codenamed Project Phantasma. The player encounters an escaped prisoner named Sumika, who guides the player as the two are targeted by a vicious rival named Stinger.

Gameplay is largely identical to Armored Core with the addition of new weapons and customization options available to the player. Players can import save files from the original game to continue their progress and use parts that are only present in the original's in-game shop. An Arena mode is included in the game, which would later be expanded in Armored Core: Master of Arena.

== Gameplay ==
Project Phantasma continues the core gameplay of Armored Core, in which players choose missions to engage enemies and earn credits. Levels remain open, and enemies can appear from any direction to attack the player. A majority of weapons and items from the original game appear with new additions that can be purchased by the player.

An import feature allows players to bring their character from Armored Core into the game, retaining all of their customization and weapons from the original game. In order to do so, they would need a save file from the original game on their memory card. Players can instead create a new character, but in doing so lose the ability to bring certain exclusive weapons and items from the original game to Project Phantasma.

Unlike Armored Core, Project Phantasma does not include a branching story line and instead focuses on a much more linear experience. Rather than the 50 missions of the original, Project Phantasma features 17, but have more variety and depth than the original game.

Project Phantasma introduces three new features: the Arena, Replay mode, and DualShock compatibility. In the Arena player is given the opportunity to face off against opponents of varying difficulty. The Arena is an optional feature, but allows players to earn more credits to unlock new weapons and items for their Armored Core. Replay mode allows players to watch an exact recreation of their last battle from multiple perspectives. DualShock functionality allows for force feedback vibrations during explosions and strikes.

Returning from Armored Core is a split screen multiplayer mode. This mode features 1-on-1 combat and allows players to bring their customized Armored Core via a memory card. This mode retains the PlayStation Link Cable functionality introduced in the first game, allowing players to connect two PlayStation consoles together and fight each other on separate televisions.

== Plot ==
The Raven (protagonist) receives an unusual request. The cryptic message tells the player to infiltrate a mysterious underground complex called Amber Crown with a promise of an extremely lucrative monetary reward. Once in Amber Crown, the player encounters Sumika Juutilainen, an escapee from the enigmatic Doomsday Organization (Wednesday Organization in Japan), the shadow group that has been operating in the complex. Sumika becomes the player's primary client and partner during the mission in Amber Crown.

As the player completes more missions, they develop a rivalry with an Armored Core pilot named Stinger, who is in the employ of the Doomsday Organization. Stinger becomes a more dangerous presence as the mystery in Amber Crown is uncovered, culminating in the revelation of Project Phantasma. A top-secret development project by the Doomsday Organization, Project Phantasma is a weapon system that would tip the balance of power. Sumika and Stinger were test subjects for the project. Stinger, desiring the strength of the Phantasma weapon, attempts to use it against the player.

The player's continued success drives Stinger to merge with Phantasma and challenge the player to a final fight. The player defeats Stinger and destroys the Phantasma project, leading to the dissolution of the Doomsday Organization.

== Release ==
Project Phantasma was initially released in Japan for the Sony PlayStation on December 4, 1997. FromSoftware partnered with ASCII Entertainment and released a North American version on October 7, 1998. A European version was never released.

As a part of Sony's PSone Classics banner, Project Phantasma was re-released in Japan for the PlayStation 3 (and later the PlayStation Vita) on September 27, 2007. It was never re-released in other territories.

On March 18, 2025, the game was released on the PlayStation Store for PlayStation 4 and PlayStation 5, included with a PS Plus Premium subscription.

== Reception ==
Reception

Aggregate score
Aggregator	Score
GameRankings	74%

Review scores
Publication	Score
AllGame	3.5/5
Electronic Gaming Monthly	5.125/10
Famitsu	27/40
Game Informer	8.75/10
GameSpot	6.6/10
IGN	7.8/10
Next Generation	3/5
Official U.S. PlayStation Magazine	4.5/5
PlayStation: The Official Magazine	3/5
Dengeki PlayStation	80/100, 85/100, 85/100, 75/100

The game received "average" reviews according to the review aggregation website GameRankings. In Japan, Famitsu gave it a score of 27 out of 40.

Project Phantasma's gameplay was well received and seen as an improvement over the original Armored Core. GameSpot's Joe Fielder noted that the depth of the missions, despite being fewer in number, was a welcome addition, stating that they required "more thought than merely 'Destroy!'" In a review for AllGame, Shawn Sackenheim praised the Arena mode, summarizing the experience as able to keep players "busy for weeks". IGN's Craig Harris was more reserved about the game, writing that it wasn't a "high-key PlayStation title", but was still "a fun action title". Next Generation said, "Those who were really into the original Armored Core – and there were more than a few – should enjoy the greater number of missions and options in Project Phantasma."

Reviewers, while generally agreeing that the game was mechanically an improvement over the original game, criticized the lack of content in Project Phantasma. GameSpot's Fielder pointed out that "Armored Core: Project Phantasma can be beaten within the space of two or three days, meaning there simply isn't quite enough here to justify the cost of purchase". AllGame's Sackenheim also commented that "the single player missions ended too quickly", but seemed to disagree on the Arena being that short. GamePro said that the game "will give any mech partisan a good fight. But if this is your first time with robot combat, you'd do well to rent the game first instead of rushing into a battle that might never be won." (Note: GamePro gave the game 4/5 for graphics, two 3.5/5 scores for sound and fun factor, and 3/5 for control.)
