= Silent Line: Armored Core =

2003 video game

- North American PlayStation 2 cover art
- Developer: FromSoftware
- Publishers: JP: FromSoftware; NA: Agetec; EU: Agetec
- Designers: Minoru Odawara; Naotake Aboshi; Hiroshi Ito
- Programmer: Koji Nakanishi
- Artists: Takeo Kido; Takahide Hamauchi
- Composers: Tsukasa Saitoh; Takeshi Yanagawa
- Series: Armored Core
- Platforms: PlayStation 2, PlayStation Portable
- Release: PlayStation 2: JP: January 23, 2003; NA: July 15, 2003; EU: July 1, 2005; PlayStation Portable: JP: November 19, 2009; NA: February 4, 2010; EU: June 15, 2010
- Genre: Third-person shooter
- Modes: Single player, multiplayer

Silent Line: Armored Core, known in Japan as Armored Core 3: Silent Line, is a 2003 third-person shooter video game developed by FromSoftware for the PlayStation 2. It is the seventh entry in the Armored Core series and a direct sequel to 2002's Armored Core 3. In 2009, Silent Line: Armored Core was ported to the PlayStation Portable.

Some time after the liberation of the underground city Layered in Armored Core 3, mankind has begun reclaiming the surface. The corporations explore the world and expand their reach, constructing factories and fortresses on the new lands. While exploring the planet, several teams vanish behind the border of a mysterious region known as the Silent Line. The player takes the role of a newly registered Raven who must unravel the secrets of the region.

Gameplay in Silent Line offers incremental feature updates to the franchise, namely the addition of player-trained computer-controlled versions of the player's Armored Core and a first-person view. Otherwise, the game retains its core structure of customizing mechs, taking on missions or fighting in the Arena, and multiplayer versus modes.

== Gameplay ==
Like its predecessor, Silent Line retains the series' core gameplay mechanics. Players operate customizable Armored Core mechs and take on missions for various clients, usually corporations. Completing missions earns the player credits after costs for repairs and fees for AI helpers are deducted. There are hundreds of parts that can be used to fully customize a player's mech, allowing them to approach missions with different equipment options. As an expansion to Armored Core 3, the game allows players to import save data and retain their Armored Cores, earned credits, and emblems.

An Arena mode allows players to raise additional funds and parts outside of the normal missions structure. Here, they face off against computer-controlled opponents and gain ranks based on their performance. Additional features include the ability to use AI companions and train computer-controlled counterparts to the player so they can play against a trained version of their own Armored Core. Players can also utilize a brand new first-person mode when piloting their mechs.

Returning from previous games is the franchise's local multiplayer options. Players can fight each other in split-screen modes or by linking multiple PlayStation 2 consoles together via Sony I-link Fire Wire cable. The same limitation of requiring multiple televisions and game copies for console link play from previous games remains in Silent Line.

== Plot ==
Following the destruction of the machine-run society of Layered at the hands of a Raven, mankind has slowly begun the process of returning to the surface and repopulating the face of the globe. Reconnaissance teams are sent out to search the land, determine what has changed, and seek areas for the returning humanity to go. A single region becomes a source of interest as teams lose contact after crossing the region's border, which earns it the moniker "Silent Line". A mysterious faction, known as the Artificial Intelligence Office, or AIO, grants the three major corporations, Mirage, Crest, and Kisaragi, with advanced technology to further their goals.

Like the previous game, the player takes the role of a Raven from a neutral mercenary organization called Global Cortex. The player is sent on missions to investigate the Silent Line and the missing teams with the support of their manager, Emma Sears. The AIO sends a representative, Sera Cross, to provide intelligence to the player during their missions.

As the player's investigation continues, the technology given by the AIO allows for the discovery of an autonomous satellite cannon. The Mirage Corporation accidentally activates a mechanism that sends out a code that causes the AIO's technology to turn on corporate forces, leading to catastrophic losses. The cannon, triggered by the mechanism, begins firing erratically across the planet, forcing the corporations to send a group of Ravens, including the player, to disable the cannon. It is revealed that not only was the cannon deliberately avoiding any regions behind the Silent Line, but that the code's origin came from deep within the territory. The player is sent to break through the defenses of the Silent Line and discovers a heavily defended fortress. Upon destroying the fortress, it is revealed that it was a relay station for an AI of another underground human settlement like Layered. This AI, IBIS, manipulated events outside of the Silent Line by masquerading as the AIO and its employees, including Sera.

The player infiltrates the underground settlement and confronts IBIS. After a massive battle, IBIS is defeated and claims that its function is complete. Similarly to the defeat of The Controller in the original Layered, the doors of the newly discovered settlement open and allow the residents to return to the surface.

== Release ==
Silent Line: Armored Core was initially released in Japan for the PlayStation 2 on January 23, 2003. FromSoftware partnered with Agetec for its international versions, releasing a North American version on July 17, 2003, and a European version on July 1, 2005.

=== Armored Core: Silent Line Portable ===
Silent Line: Armored Core was re-released for the PlayStation Portable as Armored Core: Silent Line Portable. In Japan, it was released on November 19, 2009. A North American version was released on February 4, 2010, while a European version was later released on June 15. The re-release included an ad-hoc multiplayer mode and the ability to import save data from Armored Core 3: Portable.

== Reception ==
Reception

Aggregate score
Aggregator	Score
Metacritic	(PS2) 69/100 (PSP) 68/100

Review scores
Publication	Score
Electronic Gaming Monthly	6.17/10
Famitsu	31/40
Game Informer	7.5/10
GamePro	3.5/5
GameRevolution	B−
GameSpot	6/10
GameSpy	3/5
IGN	7.5/10
Official U.S. PlayStation Magazine	3.5/5
PlayStation: The Official Magazine	8/10

The game received "average" reviews on both platforms according to the review aggregation website Metacritic. In Japan, Famitsu gave the PlayStation 2 version a score of 31 out of 40.

Reviewers criticized Silent Line for continued issues with the franchise, including archaic controls, dated graphics, and a continued lack of innovation in the franchise. In a review by IGN's Tyrone Rodriguez, he quoted the Armored Core 3 review they published a year prior by saying: "Our review of the previous AC pretty much sums up how we feel about this one, 'I just wish the series would commit to more than gradual improvement. At this pace, it looks like I'll be able to give an unqualified thumbs-up round about Armored Core 5 -- say, four or five years from now. From Software could do so much more with these games, and instead it seems committed to doing the same damn thing over and over'".

GameSpot focused on the game's controls, with writer Giancarlo Varanini calling them "sloppy" and adding, "that they detract from the game". Game Revolution's Shawn Sanders agreed, calling the controls "the game’s biggest hurdle".

Silent Line's graphics were referred to as "average" by GamePro's Atomic Dawg, while IGN's Rodriguez felt that the visuals were good enough and wrote, "why fix something if it works?"

Outside of its criticisms, the game was noted for remaining authentic to its core experience, especially in customization and gameplay. Game Revolution's Sanders praised the growth in the customization mechanics and wrote "it has never been this interesting". IGN's Rodriguez added that the gameplay, while not "graceful", was "really satisfying".
