= Frame Gride =

1999 video game

- Japanese Dreamcast cover art
- Developer: FromSoftware
- Publisher: FromSoftware
- Composer: Kota Hoshino
- Platform: Dreamcast
- Release: JP: July 15, 1999
- Genre: Fighting
- Modes: Single-player, multiplayer

Frame Gride is a 1999 mecha fighting game by FromSoftware for the Dreamcast.

Similar to FromSoftware's Armored Core series, the mecha in the game are heavily customizable.

The game had a single-player mode, a local two-player mode, and an online two-player mode. The online features were discontinued in January 2001.

== Summary ==
In the year 700 of the Imperial Calendar, the whole empire was under war conditions due to Zolt's rebellion which was raised after the death of the Emperor Regilio. The fall of the empire was only a matter of time as Zolt occupied all territories of the other Emperor-electors except for Archbishop Milange. Milange decided to bestow the title of knight and legendary power upon a man as his last hope. The player takes the role of this man and pilots the giant magical robots known as Frame Gride to face the rebel forces.

== Reception ==
Reception

Aggregate score
Aggregator	Score
GameRankings	86%

Review scores
Publication	Score
AllGame	4/5
Famitsu	29/40
GameFan	(A.C.) 90% 88%
GameSpot	8.6/10
Next Generation	3/5

The game received favorable reviews according to the review aggregation website GameRankings. Jeff Lundrigan of NextGen said of the game, "Ah, if only it hadn't twisted our thumbs with the control layout, it would have been true love. As it is, we're stuck with sore hands and a happy infatuation." In Japan, Famitsu gave it a score of 29 out of 40.
