= Armored Core: Master of Arena =

1999 video game

- North American box art
- Developer: FromSoftware
- Publishers: JP: FromSoftware; NA: Agetec
- Producer: Toshifumi Nabeshima
- Programmers: Atsushi Yanase; Hiroyuki Arai; Masaaki Sakamoto
- Artist: Shōji Kawamori
- Writer: Eiji Matsumoto
- Composers: Kota Hoshino; Tsukasa Saitoh; Keiichiro Segawa
- Series: Armored Core
- Platforms: PlayStation, PlayStation 3
- Release: PlayStation: JP: February 4, 1999; NA: March 22, 2000; PlayStation 3: JP: November 28, 2007
- Genre: Third-person shooter
- Modes: Single-player, multiplayer

Armored Core: Master of Arena is a 1999 third-person shooter video game developed and published by FromSoftware for the PlayStation. Master of Arena is the third entry in the Armored Core series and a direct sequel to Armored Core: Project Phantasma. It is the final game in the original Armored Core trilogy. The game was not released in Europe. An indirect sequel, Armored Core 2, was released on August 3, 2000, for the PlayStation 2.

The story follows a survivor whose family was lost in a battle. The survivor joins the Raven's Nest to pilot an Armored Core mecha unit through the dangerous Arena in an attempt to confront the top pilot, Hustler One, and kill him for his role in that battle. While fighting to reach the top, the survivor finds allies in the form of their manager Lana Nielsen and sponsor Elan Cubis, both of whom have their own agendas.

The gameplay is largely identical to the previous two Armored Core games, but places a larger focus on the Arena feature that was introduced in Project Phantasma. Players can import their saved characters from either of the earlier Armored Core games to retain their customization and gain an advantage in Master of Arena. A newly added "Ranker MK" mode gives players control over custom opponents that they can then fight in the Arena.

== Gameplay ==
Master of Arena, like Project Phantasma, retains a majority of the core Armored Core gameplay with relatively few changes. The Arena mode introduced in Project Phantasma returns and is now a required gameplay feature in the story rather than an optional addition. Weapons and items from both preceding games appear along with equipment exclusive to Master of Arena.

The import feature, a core component of the Armored Core franchise, continues in Master of Arena, allowing players to bring their character from Project Phantasma or the original Armored Core with a save file from their memory card. Like Project Phantasma, players can opt to create a brand new character, but will be locked out of certain weapons and items from earlier games.

Master of Arena has 19 missions and 10 arenas that cover over a hundred opponents. The Arena mode is split into two versions. On the game's first disc, several Arena matches are built into the story, whereas the second disc, titled EX Arena, covers the majority of the Arena gameplay separate from the core story. A "Ranker MK" mode on EX Arena allows players to customize opponents in special matches.

Continuing the multiplayer tradition from earlier games, Master of Arena keeps the series' split screen multiplayer mode as well as its signature link mode utilizing the PlayStation Link Cable to connect two PlayStation consoles together for 1-on-1 battles. Unlike earlier games, which required two separate copies of their respective title for system linking, players can use the two discs included in Master of Arena to gain the same functionality.

== Plot ==
The story of Master of Arena is concurrent between the original Armored Core, a massive battle occurs in Isaac City between two corporations and causes numerous civilian casualties. The Raven from this game is a survivor of this battle, having lost their entire family to the chaos. Swearing revenge, the player enters the Raven's Nest, the central organization of Armored Core pilots, to fight their way to the top and kill Hustler One, the pilot of the famed Nine-Ball mech that was at the center of the battle.

The player encounters Lana Nielsen, an operator who becomes the player's manager. Elan Cubis, an influential figure in a company called Progtech, becomes the player's sponsor in an attempt to investigate the Raven's Nest. With these allies, the player rises through the ranks of Raven's Nest. After the player has completed several missions, Progtech facilities begin to come under attack, and later some high-ranking pilots are found to be involved in stealing secret materials from the company. A major attack on the Progtech corporate headquarters reveals that Elan is being targeted, and the attackers follow him to a laboratory deep in Isaac City.

The attackers are shown to be led by Hustler One, who confronts the player. After his Nine-Ball mech is damaged, Hustler One retreats. The player takes the fight to the Arena, seemingly defeating Hustler One. A mysterious message from Lana brings the player to an abandoned factory where it is revealed that she, like Hustler One, are actually components of a master AI that is controlling numerous Nine-Ball mechs and created both the corporations and the Raven's Nest to rebuild humanity. The player narrowly defeats the powerful Nine-Ball mech and seemingly puts an end to the AI.

== Release ==
Master of Arena was initially released in Japan for the PlayStation on February 4, 1999. FromSoftware partnered with Agetec and released a North American version on March 22, 2000. A European version was never released.

As a part of Sony's PSone Classics banner, Master of Arena was re-released in Japan for the PlayStation 3 (and later the PlayStation Vita) on November 28, 2007. It was never re-released in other territories.

On March 18, 2025, the game was released on the PlayStation Store for PlayStation 4 and PlayStation 5, included with a PS Plus Premium subscription.

== Reception ==
Reception

Aggregate score
| Aggregator | Score |
|---|---|
| GameRankings | 70% |

Review scores
| Publication | Score |
|---|---|
| AllGame | 3.5/5 |
| CNET Gamecenter | 8/10 |
| Electronic Gaming Monthly | 5.5/10 |
| Famitsu | 29/40 |
| Game Informer | 7.5/10 |
| GameFan | 81% (Note: In GameFan's viewpoint of the game, three critics gave it each a score of 87, 65, and 90.) |
| GameRevolution | B− |
| GameSpot | 6.3/10 |
| IGN | 8/10 |
| Next Generation | 3/5 |
| Official U.S. PlayStation Magazine | 2.5/5 |

The game received "average" reviews according to the review aggregation website GameRankings. In Japan, Famitsu gave it a score of 29 out of 40.

The game's expansion of the Arena concept was well received by reviewers, with GameRevolution's Shawn Sanders commenting that the feature "is now, interestingly enough, nicely integrated into the whole game". AllGame's Joe Ottoson praised the Arena fights, writing "the action is more intense when you square off against other AC pilots at your own level". Game Informer's Erik Reppen said that the Arenas were "plentiful and great". The Ranker MK feature was praised by several reviewers. Sanders called it "the greatest addition to the game of all time". Reppen wrote that "the option to design your own AC opponents for parts and AI aggressiveness added a lot to the single player experience".

Criticism of the game was directed at the game's underdeveloped story, aging visuals, difficult control scheme, and a bug that plagued the local multiplayer mode. The lack of an engaging story was commented on by Game Informer's Andy McNamara, who said "it just can't keep my interest". GamePro's The Freshman commented on the controls, which remained unchanged from the video game and noted that due to the original game coming out prior to the DualShock controller's release, Master of Arena didn't take advantage of more comprehensive controls. He criticized the game for the impact that the control scheme had on playability, saying "more precise control over looking about would have helped out considerably". (Note: GamePro gave the game three 3.5/5 scores for graphics, control, and overall fun factor, and 3/5 for sound.)

GameSpot's Joe Fielder wrote that the identical graphical quality was "unfortunate because they're looking more and more dated as time goes by". The Freshman echoed the lack of improvement in the visuals, writing that while the game looked "fine", he believed "a little work to improve the overall presentation would have been nice". Sanders reported that a bug in the game's split-screen mode caused Player 1 to not have a working radar, which was a major disadvantage, calling it "inept". The lack of evolution in the game was a particular point of criticism shared by many reviewers, with Game Informer's Andrew Reiner writing: "If you've played the other two versions, then you've essentially played a piece of this one as well". NextGen's Greg Orlando, while commenting on the aging concept of the game, still found there to be enough in the game worth playing, saying: "The master of mechs loses a little shine with its third edition, but continues to stomp a goodly amount of buttocks."
