= Armored Core =

Mecha-based video game series

- Genre: Third-person shooter
- Developer: FromSoftware
- Publishers: FromSoftware; Sony Computer Entertainment (1997); ASCII Entertainment (1998); Agetec (2000–2006); Ubisoft (2001, 2008); Metro3D (2002–2003); 505 Games (2006–2007); Red Ant Enterprises (2006); Sega (2007); Bandai Namco Entertainment (2012–2023)
- Platforms: Mobile phones; PlayStation; PlayStation 2; PlayStation 3; PlayStation 4; PlayStation 5; PlayStation Portable; Windows; Xbox 360; Xbox One; Xbox Series X/S
- First release: Armored Core; July 10, 1997
- Latest release: Armored Core VI: Fires of Rubicon; August 25, 2023

Armored Core is a third-person shooter mecha video game series developed by FromSoftware. The series centers on a silent protagonist who takes on work as a mercenary pilot in the far future, operating large robot combat units known as Armored Cores at the behest of corporate and private clients. As the player completes missions for these clients, they gain credits to improve their Armored Core and unlock further opportunities to make money. Some games include an "Arena" mode in which the player fights other Armored Core pilots in head-to-head battles, which can reward the player with further income or prestige.

Currently, several independent continuities exist, spread across 14 main games, seven spin-offs, and three remastered re-releases, with different releases divided by a different set of "generations" of sequels that resets with every main numbered entry. The first game in the series, Armored Core, was released in 1997, while the most recent, Armored Core VI: Fires of Rubicon, was released in 2023. The series has been released on various PlayStation and Xbox consoles, as well as Windows and mobile phones.

In 2007, the series was adapted to manga by Fujimi Shobo as Armored Core: Tower City Blade, and in 2024, to television by Tim Miller as an episode of Secret Level titled Armored Core: Asset Management, starring the voices of Keanu Reeves, Erin Yvette, Temuera Morrison, Patrick Schwarzenegger, and Steve Blum.

== Premise ==
In the original continuity established by 1997's Armored Core through 2001's Armored Core 2: Another Age, Earth experienced a cataclysm known as the "Great Destruction" and humanity has been forced underground. Corporations begin fighting for dominance, leading to the increasing reliance on Armored Core pilots called Ravens. Following the events of 1999's Armored Core: Master of Arena, humanity rebuilds and colonizes Mars. Through 2000's Armored Core 2 and its expansion, Another Age, the fledgling Earth government struggles to maintain power as opportunistic corporations exploit the power gap and rebel groups resist against the hegemony of government and business interests.

The series was rebooted with 2002's Armored Core 3, beginning a new story arc that concluded with Armored Core: Last Raven in 2005. Following a global nuclear war, humanity has retreated underground. Following centuries of rule by an artificial intelligence called The Controller, its decay leads to the destruction of much of humanity's underground network, causing them to look toward the surface for safety. By the end of 2003's Silent Line: Armored Core, humanity has fully returned to the surface of Earth. The final two games of this continuity, 2004's Armored Core: Nexus and 2005's Armored Core: Last Raven involve the end of the existing power dynamic of corporations and Ravens fighting over the surface.

2006's Armored Core 4 rebooted the series yet again. Here, corporations have seized control of Earth governments and are waging war across the surface for dominance. A war waged over the course of the game pollutes the environment, leading to the creation of floating cities in 2008's Armored Core: For Answer. Depending on the player's choices, humanity either barely survives the fallout of For Answer's conflict or is completely eradicated.

The third continuity of the series continued with 2012's Armored Core V. A single corporation has dominance over a contaminated Earth and is being opposed by a resistance faction that seeks to overthrow them, while 2013's Armored Core: Verdict Day details the outbreak of another war 100 years later following an apocalyptic event.

Another continuity has begun with 2023's Armored Core VI: Fires of Rubicon. The game takes place far away from Earth in a human-colonized star system on the planet Rubicon 3. Decades prior to the game's start, a powerful resource called Coral was discovered, leading to significant technological advances, but a disaster called the Fires of Ibis scorched the entire Rubicon system and left it highly contaminated. However, the Coral, thought to have all burned, has begun to reappear, bringing multiple corporations into conflict for control of it which, in turn, has brought the attention of mercenaries. Added into the conflict are the Planetary Closure Administration, an organization tasked with quarantining Rubicon, and the Rubicon Liberation Front, a resistance group who venerate the Coral, wishing to end its exploitation and free the planet.

== Gameplay ==
Armored Core's missions can involve multiple objectives and pit the player against computer controlled opponents.

Within the core games of the franchise, the gameplay is generally focused on the player taking the role of a mech-piloting mercenary, taking on missions for various clients and gaining currency from completing them. Missions can involve multiple objectives and pit the player against computer controlled opponents, some of which pilot mechs as well. Upon completion of a mission, the operating costs of the mech, such as repairs and ammunition, are deducted from the total earnings of the player, as well as compensation for destroying valuable objects within the mission area. Likewise, if the player loses a mission, those same deductions occur from the player's direct balance.

The game's mechs, called Armored Cores (or ACs for short), are highly customizable with hundreds of parts and weapons that can be purchased from an in-game shop (and equally sold back to the shop at full price) or by fulfilling certain requirements. Different parts can provide gameplay advantages in certain terrains or against certain enemies, which forces the player to put thought into how to approach the construction of their mech as each sortie often has different obstacles and hazards to overcome. The customization of Armored Cores is strictly limited by multiple factors such as the maximum weight load of their leg parts carrying the overall weight of every equipped part attached to it, and the energy output of their generators supplying power to all equipped parts of the AC. As such, an Armored Core's performance varies depending on the parts that compose it, as an over-equipped AC becomes overburdened and performs slower in combat, while a lightweight AC yields faster speed and quicker responses to enemy fire at the cost of defensive and offensive counter-measures.

Many of the franchise's games feature a branching storyline where taking on certain missions can block off others, with consequences of a player's decision in a mission being relayed to them at the end of a mission. Certain games require multiple playthroughs to access additional contents, such as missions inaccessible during the initial playthrough, and even different endings that add additional lore and context to the games.

An Arena mode introduced in Armored Core: Project Phantasma gave players the opportunity to fight opponents outside of missions for additional rewards. Project Phantasma also introduced the import feature, allowing players to retain their progress from a previous entry when starting a new one. This import feature would become a mainstay of the franchise, with "expansion" titles like Silent Line: Armored Core allowing for importing saved data.

=== Multiplayer ===
Since its first release, the Armored Core games have featured multiplayer options in some form. In the original PlayStation era, local split-screen multiplayer modes were the primary method, generally featuring head-to-head battles. A PlayStation Link Cable feature, allowing for the connection of two PlayStation consoles, was included in all three original Armored Core titles.

With the PlayStation 2, split-screen and console linking continue to be the primary source of multiplayer. 2004's Armored Core: Nexus introduced the LAN multiplayer mode, in addition to connecting through their internet service and allowed up to 4 players to fight in matches together.

Online multiplayer was first introduced in the Japanese release of Armored Core 2: Another Age, but was removed in other regions due to the PlayStation Network Adapter not being ready in time. No PlayStation 2-era game after this release would include online play either, with the first game to do so being Armored Core 4.

== Games ==
Release timeline
1997	Armored Core
1997	Project Phantasma
1998
1999	Master of Arena
2000	Armored Core 2
2001	2: Another Age
2002	Armored Core 3
2003	Silent Line
2004	Nexus
2004	Nine Breaker
2004	Formula Front
2005	Last Raven
2006	Armored Core 4
2007
2008	For Answer
2009–2011
2012	Armored Core V
2013	Verdict Day
2014–2022
2023	Armored Core VI

=== Armored Core ===
The original trilogy of Armored Core games were developed for the original PlayStation by FromSoftware and established many of the core themes and mechanics that would be found in the rest of the series. The debut title, Armored Core, was released on July 10, 1997, in Japan. Story elements like corporate-funded conflicts, post-apocalyptic settings, and silent protagonists were introduced in the first game. The game's mechanics revolve around taking on missions from various clients for pay, using earned money to customize the player's Armored Core unit.

Armored Core: Project Phantasma was released as a stand-alone expansion to the original game, released on December 4, 1997. Project Phantasma introduced an Arena mechanic that would be expanded on in later titles, as well as an import mechanic that would become an important feature through the franchise. Players were able to import save data from earlier Armored Core games and bring their existing Armored Core units into the expansions.

A second stand-alone expansion, Armored Core: Master of Arena, was released on February 4, 1999, and was the final game released for the original PlayStation. It concluded the core arc of the original Armored Core and greatly expanded on the Arena mechanic introduced in Project Phantasma. Like its predecessor, Master of Arena allowed players to import save files from both the original Armored Core and Project Phantasma to continue their progress.

All three games from the original PlayStation era were re-released on the PlayStation Network in 2007 for the tenth anniversary of the original title. The original Armored Core was also released on the Japanese PlayStation Classic in 2018.

=== Armored Core 2 ===
With the transition to the PlayStation 2, FromSoftware released Armored Core 2 six months after the system's launch in Japan on August 3, 2000. As a narrative sequel to the original trilogy, Armored Core 2 transitioned the series away from the post-apocalyptic setting and added more science fiction elements, such as Mars colonization. Much of the gameplay remained the same, including the mission structure, customization, and Arena modes. The title did overhaul the visuals from the original game, taking advantage of the added power of the new console, but overall designs stayed similar. Unlike Project Phantasma and Master of Arena, players could not import their saves to the new game.

Armored Core 2: Another Age was released on April 12, 2001, as a stand-alone expansion. It allowed players to import their save files from Armored Core 2 and continue with their existing Armored Core units. The game introduced cooperative mission mode. The Japanese version of Armored Core 2 was the first title to include online broadband play, allowing players to fight each other over the internet.

=== Armored Core 3 ===
Armored Core 3 was released on April 4, 2002, and served as a reboot for the franchise. The story returned to a post-apocalyptic setting and retained the core concept of corporate warfare and mercenary mission structure. Very little gameplay was changed from the earlier PlayStation 2 titles, instead focusing on incremental improvements and minor features like USB mice, computer-controlled allies, and surround sound. Due to its nature as a reboot, players could not import save data from Armored Core 2 or Another Age.

A stand-alone expansion, Silent Line: Armored Core, was released on January 23, 2003, and was a direct sequel to Armored Core 3. Like other expansions in the franchise, players could import their progress from Armored Core 3 into Silent Line, retaining their parts and credits from the earlier game. Silent Line introduced new gameplay mechanics, including computer-controlled companions and a first person mode.

Armored Core: Nexus was released on March 18, 2004, as a direct sequel to Silent Line. Unlike its predecessor, Nexus was treated as a core entry rather than an expansion and did not allow for save data import. While carrying over parts from 3 and Silent Line, mechanics changed significantly compared to past expansions. The heat mechanic introduced in Armored Core 2 was made much more influential, especially with the introduction of booster heat. All part stats were also totally redistributed. The game was the first in the franchise to include support for dual analog sticks. It also introduced a new LAN multiplayer mode that allowed up to 4 players to participate in matches against each other.

Armored Core: Last Raven was released on August 4, 2005, and served as the conclusion to Armored Core 3's story arc. The game is structured around a 24-hour clock that moves forward as missions progress. At the end of the 24-hour period, choices made by the player can alter the outcome of the plot. The game introduced a component damage system, allowing for individual parts to be broken in combat.

=== Armored Core 4 ===
Armored Core 4 was released on December 21, 2006, for the PlayStation 3, serving as another reboot for the franchise. An Xbox 360 version, the first instance of a main title in the franchise being released outside of the PlayStation ecosystem, was released on March 22, 2007. Gameplay in Armored Core 4 has been sped up and streamlined from its predecessors in an attempt to make the game more accessible to new players. The game marks the first instance of online multiplayer outside of the Japanese release of Armored Core 2: Another Age.

Armored Core: For Answer was released on March 19, 2008, as a standalone expansion to Armored Core 4. It incorporates an online co-operative mode and a branching storyline. The game was noted for its technical problems on the PlayStation 3 version. Like Nexus, this game did not simply add content to its predecessor and changed gameplay by greatly increasing booster speeds and increasing generator performance.

=== Armored Core V ===
Armored Core V was released on January 26, 2012, for the PlayStation 3 and Xbox 360 and acts as indirect sequel to Armored Core 4 and Armored Core: For Answer. The game focuses on the online multiplayer component and includes far fewer offline story missions than its predecessors. In the game's online mode, players battle for territory in teams of up to 20 players. A co-operative mode is included for players to fight NPCs alongside other players for various rewards.

Armored Core: Verdict Day was released on September 24, 2013, as a standalone expansion to Armored Core V. The game retains its predecessor's multiplayer focus, though it allows players to create teams of AI companions instead of requiring teams composed entirely of players. A full-length story mode returns alongside a newly implemented "hardcore mode", and players can import their saved games from Armored Core V to retain their personalized mechs.

=== Armored Core VI: Fires of Rubicon ===
Armored Core VI: Fires of Rubicon is another reboot of the series, unrelated to any past games, set in an alternate future where humanity has developed an interstellar civilization. The player character, codenamed "C4-621" is an augmented Armored Core pilot sent to the distant planet Rubicon 3 to fight in a war between corporations, the government and the local inhabitants for the control of a highly valuable resource called "Coral" which exists only there. The game was released on PlayStation 4, PlayStation 5, Windows, Xbox One, and Xbox Series X/S on August 25, 2023.

=== Spin-offs ===
In 2004, FromSoftware released two spin-offs from the main Armored Core series. The first, Armored Core: Nine Breaker was released on October 28, for the PlayStation 2. Removing the focus from story-based missions, the game is instead built around an Arena mode where the player must compete with computer-controlled opponents to increase their rank. Minigames designed as training exercises were included to allow players to practice specific skills. Armored Core: Formula Front was released on December 12, for the PlayStation Portable. Like Nine Breaker, its focus was on Arena-style gameplay, though a new mechanic put a focus on building an artificial intelligence strategy for the Armored Core units to execute. Formula Front was later released for the PlayStation 2 in Japan.

Several mobile games were released in the Armored Core franchise from 2004 to 2008, but they were never released outside of Japan. An American version of these mobile games was in development around 2005, but the title was never released.

Platform releases (by year)
Platform Game	PlayStation	PlayStation 2	PlayStation Portable	PlayStation 3	PlayStation 4 & 5	Xbox 360	Xbox Series X/S & One & Windows
Armored Core	1997	—N/a	—N/a	2007	2025	—N/a	—N/a
Project Phantasma	1997	—N/a	—N/a	2007	2025	—N/a	—N/a
Master of Arena	1999	—N/a	—N/a	2007	2025	—N/a	—N/a
Armored Core 2	—N/a	2000	—N/a	—N/a	—N/a	—N/a	—N/a
2: Another Age	—N/a	2001	—N/a	—N/a	—N/a	—N/a	—N/a
Armored Core 3	—N/a	2002	2009	—N/a	—N/a	—N/a	—N/a
Silent Line	—N/a	2002	2009	—N/a	—N/a	—N/a	—N/a
Nexus	—N/a	2004	—N/a	—N/a	—N/a	—N/a	—N/a
Nine Breaker	—N/a	2004	—N/a	—N/a	—N/a	—N/a	—N/a
Formula Front	—N/a	2005	2004	—N/a	—N/a	—N/a	—N/a
Last Raven	—N/a	2005	2010	—N/a	—N/a	—N/a	—N/a
Armored Core 4	—N/a	—N/a	—N/a	2006	—N/a	2006	—N/a
For Answer	—N/a	—N/a	—N/a	2008	—N/a	2008	—N/a
Armored Core V	—N/a	—N/a	—N/a	2012	—N/a	2012	—N/a
Verdict Day	—N/a	—N/a	—N/a	2013	—N/a	2013	—N/a
Armored Core VI	—N/a	—N/a	—N/a	—N/a	2023	—N/a	2023
Total games	3	8	4	7	4	4	1

== Other media ==
=== Manga ===
Armored Core: Tower City Blade is a manga by Fujimi Shobo based on the game. It was serialized in Dragon Age Pure between March 14 and April 14, 2007. A project called Armored Core: Fort Tower Song was to consist of a book and an anime also released in 2007. The book was completed but the anime was not. By 2011 FromSoftware canceled the anime project due to View Works shutting down.

=== Television ===
Armored Core was a featured game in Tim Miller's anthology series Secret Level (2024). The episode, entitled Armored Core: Asset Management, starred the performances of Keanu Reeves, Erin Yvette, Temuera Morrison, Patrick Schwarzenegger, and Steve Blum.

== Legacy ==
The making of Armored Core solidified FromSoftware's development skills, and in July 1999, they released the multiplayer action game Frame Gride for the Sega Dreamcast. The company's focus would shift from RPGs to mech games due in part to the success of the Armored Core series. In 2002, FromSoftware released the mech action game Murakumo: Renegade Mech Pursuit for the Xbox. In 2004, they released another Xbox title, Metal Wolf Chaos. In 2005, FromSoftware would start to produce a series of licensed games based on the various anime properties under the banner Another Century's Episode. Kenichiro Tsukuda, the producer of the Armored Core series produced a similar video game called Daemon X Machina that was released for the Nintendo Switch and Microsoft Windows.

Many of Armored Core's core gameplay philosophies, namely its open-ended customization options that affect gameplay, the necessity of mastering its cumbersome control scheme to succeed, large-scale battles requiring trial-and-error gameplay loop, and its deep yet vague lore scattered throughout, have since been an integral appeal of the Soulslike genre of videogames, as seen later with FromSoftware's more popular titles such as Demon's Souls, the Dark Souls trilogy, Bloodborne, Sekiro: Shadows Die Twice and Elden Ring.
