= Armored Core 3 =

2002 video game

- North American PlayStation 2 cover art
- Developer: FromSoftware
- Publishers: JP: FromSoftware; NA: Agetec; EU: Metro3D
- Producer: Kenichiro Tsukuda
- Programmer: Koji Nakanishi
- Artists: Takeo Kido; Takahide Hamauchi
- Composer: Tsukasa Saitoh
- Series: Armored Core
- Platforms: PlayStation 2, PlayStation Portable
- Release: PlayStation 2: JP: April 4, 2002; NA: September 11, 2002; EU: May 30, 2003; PlayStation Portable: JP: July 30, 2009; NA: October 22, 2009; EU: May 19, 2010
- Genre: Third-person shooter
- Modes: Single player, multiplayer

Armored Core 3 is a 2002 third-person shooter video game developed by FromSoftware for the PlayStation 2. It is the sixth entry in the Armored Core series. Armored Core 3 acts as a reboot for the franchise and begins a storyline that would continue through Armored Core: Last Raven. In 2009, Armored Core 3 was ported to the PlayStation Portable.

As a reboot of the franchise, Armored Core 3 returns the setting back to the post-apocalyptic setting of the earlier PlayStation trilogy. The player is a mercenary in a future where humanity has been driven underground and is ruled by a powerful artificial intelligence called The Controller. Despite The Controller's rule, corporations fight each other for dominance.

Armored Core 3 is largely unchanged from its predecessor. Players operate mech units that they may customize with credits earned from completing missions and fighting in an arena. Customization extends to every aspect of a player's Armored Core unit, including the individual parts, weapons, paint, and emblem. Local multiplayer modes allow for up to 4 players to fight each other with their custom Armored Cores.

== Gameplay ==
Armored Core 3 continues the series' core mechanics. Players pilot Armored Core units, massive customizable mechs. In order to earn money to customize their Armored Core, players must complete missions for three major corporations. This money can then be used for weapons, items, and parts to improve their Armored Core.

Missions, like in earlier titles, retain their focus on completing objectives and destroying enemies. Mission costs like repairs and ammunition supply are automatically deducted from the reward. Voice acted briefings prior to missions provides a small amount of story regarding the mission.

Returning after a removal in Another Age, the Arena is a free-form game mode that allows players to fight other pilots to rise in rank. Winning Arena matches can provide players with credits and parts that can be used on their Armored Core unit.

Like its earlier counterparts, Armored Core 3 hosts a local multiplayer mode that allows players to fight their friends via split screen or console linking with a Sony I-Link Fire Wire cable. As a new feature, the Fire Wire cable allows for up to 4 players to connect their consoles rather than the previous maximum of 2 players. An offline bot mode for fighting computer opponents is included.

As a new feature, Armored Core 3 supports USB mice for emblem design. Additional features include computer-controlled allies that assist with missions and detachable weapons. Armored Core 3 also supports Dolby Pro Logic II surround sound.

== Plot ==
Armored Core 3 serves as a reboot for the Armored Core franchise but retains many similar elements to the original Armored Core. Set in a post-apocalyptic future, Armored Core 3 depicts a world where humanity has begun to live underneath the Earth's surface after a catastrophic global nuclear war broke out on the surface. The human beings who survived formed a subterranean society called "Layered". Layered is ruled by an artificial intelligence known as "The Controller", which dictates almost everything that happens in the world. The two major corporations, Mirage and Crest Industries, and a relatively more minor one, Kisaragi, all vie for dominance and control over the land and assets in Layered. At the game's outset, The Controller seems to be experiencing frequent errors, which has led to a growth of support for a rebel group, known as Union, that wishes to overthrow The Controller.

The player takes the role of a Raven, mercenaries that are registered with the neutral Global Cortex organization. Over the course of the game, the player is provided with missions for the various factions by Laine Meyers, the player's manager, and the player can choose who to support. In later missions, it is revealed that The Controller is manipulating the various factions in order to destroy infrastructure and support systems for Layered, leading to a direct confrontation with The Controller. After the player destroys it, an emergency program opens Layered's blast doors and allows for surface access for the first time in centuries.

== Release ==
Armored Core 3 was initially released in Japan for the PlayStation 2 on April 4, 2002. FromSoftware partnered with Agetec and released a North American version on September 5, 2002. A European version was released in partnership with Metro3D on May 30, 2003.

=== Armored Core 3 Portable ===
Armored Core 3 was re-released for the PlayStation Portable as Armored Core 3 Portable. In Japan, it was released on July 30, 2009. A North American version was released on October 21, 2009, while a European version was released on May 19, 2010. The re-release included widescreen support and an ad hoc multiplayer mode.

== Reception ==
Reception

Aggregate score
Aggregator	Score	
Aggregator	PS2	PSP
Metacritic	74/100	43/100

Review scores
Publication	Score	
Publication	PS2	PSP
Edge	8/10	N/A
Electronic Gaming Monthly	7.5/10	N/A
Eurogamer	6/10	N/A
Famitsu	34/40	N/A
Game Informer	8/10	N/A
GamePro	3.5/5	N/A
GameRevolution	B+	N/A
GameSpot	7.5/10	N/A
GameSpy	82%	N/A
GameZone	8/10	N/A
IGN	7.3/10	N/A
Official U.S. PlayStation Magazine	3.5/5	N/A
PlayStation: The Official Magazine	7/10	2/5

The PlayStation 2 version of Armored Core 3 received "mixed or average" reviews, while the PlayStation Portable version received "generally unfavorable reviews", according to the review aggregator website Metacritic. In Japan, Famitsu gave the former console version a score of 34 out of 40.

Critics positively received the variety of mission objectives and the continued customization depth of the franchise but were unimpressed with the incremental nature of the game, barebones story, and continued control problems. Eurogamer's Martin Taylor called the variety of objectives "impressive", though later added: "Sadly, the prevalence of missions that have you either bumbling around streets or in various industrial buildings starts to become tiresome and samey" due to "uninspiring locales". In regards to the game's complicated gameplay, Shawn Sanders from Game Revolution stated that "none have been able to compete with the complexity and depth that is the Armored Core series".

The lack of meaningful updates to the core experience was a sore point for many reviewers. In a mixed review, David Smith from IGN wrote: "From Software could do so much more with these games, and instead it seems committed to doing the same damn thing over and over". GameSpot's Greg Kasavin called the design "dated" and criticized its "unspectacular presentation".

As in previous titles, the game's lack of depth to its story was criticized. Dylan Parrotta from GameZone called the story "under-developed at best and totally unintelligible at worst". Outdated and overbearing controls were especially derided by reviewers. When discussing the lack of dual analog control, Eurogamer's Martin Taylor said: "This glaring oversight in the control scheme hinders the player far more than it should, and makes targeting roof-mounted or flying enemies a task in itself".
