= Murakumo: Renegade Mech Pursuit =

2002 video game

- Developer: FromSoftware
- Publishers: JP: FromSoftware; NA: Ubi Soft
- Director: Masanori Takeuchi
- Producer: Akinori Kaneko
- Programmer: Kiwamu Takahashi
- Platform: Xbox
- Release: JP: July 25, 2002; NA: March 6, 2003
- Genre: Third-person shooter
- Mode: Single-player

Murakumo: Renegade Mech Pursuit is a third-person shooter developed by FromSoftware and published by Ubi Soft. It is FromSoftware's first game for the Xbox. The game was originally scheduled for release in the U.S. on February 25, 2003, but was delayed to March 6.

== Story ==
In the year 2090, a new energy source is invented and a city is constructed to focus on the further development of this energy called Oliver Port. In response, a company called LugnalCorp utilizes this energy source for the development of conscious mecha known as ARKS (Artificial Reflexive Keneticoid). Due to the high industrial demand for the ARKs, LugnalCorp rushes the ARKs into production; after a while of operation, the ARKs rebel against their human operators and start their rebellion over Oliver Port. A team of fighter pilots is assembled to combat the renegade ARKs under the name of Murakumo.

== Reception ==
Reception

Aggregate score
Aggregator	Score
Metacritic	48/100

Review scores
Publication	Score
Edge	5/10
Electronic Gaming Monthly	5.17/10 (Note: In Electronic Gaming Monthly's review of the game, one critic gave it 5.5/10, and the rest gave it each a score of 5/10.)
EP Daily	6/10
Famitsu	29/40
Game Informer	5.75/10
GameSpot	3.4/10
GameSpy	2/5
IGN	4.5/10
Official Xbox Magazine (US)	5.9/10
X-Play	2/5

The game received "generally unfavorable reviews" according to the review aggregation website Metacritic. GameSpot's Giancarlo Varanini described it as "one of the worst games to come out for the Xbox this year". In Japan, Famitsu gave it a score of 29 out of 40. GamePro said of the game, "The controls are surprisingly cumbersome for a twitch game in which precision is crucial. Steering and aiming is a nightmare, and certain weapons border on unusable." (Note: GamePro gave the game 3.5/5 for graphics, 2/5 for sound, 3/5 for control. and 2.5/5 for fun factor.)
