= Split screen (computing) =

Computer display technique

Various methods to display multiple signals on a 4:3 screen (diagram is 16:9): 1+3, 3+1 (1:1), 2×2, 3×3, 4×4 (4:3), 1+1 (2:3 vertical, 8:3 horizontal), 4×3 (1:1), 1 in 12 (4:3).

Split screen is a display technique in computer graphics that consists of dividing graphics and/or text into non-overlapping adjacent parts, typically as two or four rectangular areas. This allows for the simultaneous presentation of (usually) related graphical and textual information on a computer display. TV sports adopted this presentation methodology in the 1960s for instant replay.

Non-dynamic split screens differ from windowing systems in that the latter allowed overlapping and freely movable parts of the screen (the "windows") to present both related and unrelated application data to the user. In contrast, split-screen views are strictly limited to fixed positions.

The split screen technique can also be used to run two instances of an application, potentially allowing another user to interact with the second instance.

== In operating systems ==
Split screen modes are used by mobile operating systems to enable computer multitasking similar to the window interface present in desktop operating systems. Android supports split screen view of two apps natively on all devices, while certain devices, such as Samsung Galaxy Z TriFold, support three sumultaneous views. Split screen functionality is not supported on iOS, but a similar feature called Split View is present in iPadOS, first introduced in 2015 with the first generation of iPad Pro.

== In video games ==
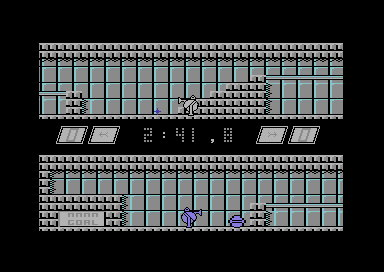
Split-screen multiplayer in Limes & Napoleon

The split screen feature is commonly used in non-networked, also known as couch co-op, video games with multiplayer options.

In its most easily understood form, a split screen for a multiplayer video game is an audiovisual output device (usually a standard television for video game consoles) where the display has been divided into 2-4 equally sized areas (depending on number of players) so that the players can explore different areas simultaneously without being close to each other. This has historically been remarkably popular on consoles, which until the 2000s did not have access to the Internet or any other network and is less common today with modern support for networked console-to-console multiplayer. In competitive split-screen games, it is customarily considered cheating to look at another player's screen section to gain an advantage, referred to as "screenpeeking".

=== History ===
Split screen gaming dates back to at least the 1970s, with games such Drag Race (1977) from Kee Games in the arcades being presented in this format. It has always been a common feature of two or more player home console and computer games too, with notable titles being Kikstart II for 8-bit systems, a number of 16-bit racing games (such as Lotus Esprit Turbo Challenge and Road Rash II), and action/strategy games (such as Toejam & Earl and Lemmings), all employing a vertical or horizontal screen split for two player games.

Xenophobe is notable as a three-way split screen arcade title, although on home platforms it was reduced to one or two screens. The addition of four controller ports on home consoles also ushered in more four-way split screen games, with Mario Kart 64 and Goldeneye 007 on the Nintendo 64 being two well known examples. In arcades, machines tended to move towards having a whole screen for each player, or multiple connected machines, for multiplayer. On home machines, especially in the first and third person shooter genres, multiplayer is now more common over a network or the internet rather than locally with split screen.

Starting from the late 2000s, the presence of split screen multiplayer has largely been declining due to the increasing prevalence of online multiplayer, though TechRadar reported a resurgence of split screen due to support from independent studios and increased interest from the players.

== See also ==
- Screen tearing
- Split screen (video production)
