= Kuon =

2004 video game

- North American cover art
- Developer: FromSoftware
- Publishers: JP: FromSoftware; NA: Agetec; EU: Indie Games Productions
- Producer: Atsushi Taniguchi
- Programmer: Yasushi Umehara
- Artist: Nozomu Iwai
- Composer: Yuji Kanda
- Platform: PlayStation 2
- Release: JP: April 1, 2004; NA: December 7, 2004; EU: April 14, 2006
- Genre: Survival horror
- Mode: Single-player

Kuon (Note: Kuon (Japanese: 九怨), alternately read as "Nine Evils" and "Eternity".) is a 2004 survival horror video game developed by FromSoftware for the PlayStation 2. Published by FromSoftware in Japan, it was released in North America by Agetec, and in Europe by Nobilis and Indie Games Productions in 2006. The narrative takes place in Japan's Heian period, and follows the actions of three protagonists during an outbreak of monsters at Fujiwara Manor in Kyoto; Utsuki, daughter of the onmyōji Ashiya Doman, Doman's apprentice Sakuya, and the veteran onmyōji Abe no Seimei. Gameplay has the different characters exploring the grounds and buildings of Fujiwara Manor, solving puzzles and fighting off hostile monsters.

The game was conceived by its producer Atsushi Taniguchi. His aim was to create a dark narrative based around Japanese kaidan ghost stories, with a focus on female protagonists. The gameplay was designed as an evolution of the company's earlier title Lost Kingdoms (2002). The artwork was handled by Nozomu Iwai, with promotional artwork designed by Kyosuke Chinai. Reception was mixed, with praise going to its atmosphere while many journalists faulted its controls and gameplay.

== Gameplay ==
The player character Sakuya battles a monster.

Kuon is a survival horror video game in which the player takes on the role of three characters—Utsuki, Sakuya, and Abe no Seimei—exploring the buildings and grounds of Fujiwara Manor. The characters are seen from an overhead third-person fixed perspective. The characters navigate the mansion during gameplay; the standard pace is a slow walk, with an option to run, but comes with a greater risk of attracting enemies. To progress the game, the characters explore the mansion to solve puzzles and find key items. Items are displayed in environments using flashing points of light. From the beginning of the game, certain doors within the mansion grounds are sealed, and require a particular item to open. These items can be restricted to particular characters.

During navigation, the characters are attacked by monsters, many of which are drawn by noise. The characters have access to different weapon types; Utsuki uses a knife, Sakuya uses a fan, and Abe no Seimei, a naginata. There is no lock-on, meaning characters must be aligned manually before attacking an enemy. The characters can also find a limited number of spell cards during exploration, which can be used in combat. There are two types of cards: projectiles that trigger an immediate attack, and summoning papers that create an allied creature for a limited time that attacks enemies.

Navigation is impeded by areas of negative energy, both occurring naturally and when enemies appear. The characters can be afflicted with vertigo when low on health, or struck by dark energy; when struck by the energy when running, the character is momentarily stunned. The character can recover by standing still and using meditation to restore health and remove the vertigo effect. The player can also use healing items found around the manor to restore health.

== Synopsis ==
=== Setting and characters ===
Kuon takes place in and around Fujiwara Manor, an estate in Kyoto, Japan during the Heian period. Central to the plot are two magical Mulberry trees planted near the present Fujiwara Manor by the Hata clan. The trees birth silkworms which weave cocoons around the dead and resurrect them. The resurrection can only be sustained by merging with other living beings, including humans, and absorbing their "grudge". The ultimate goal of the Mulberries is to perform the merging nine times, completing the Kuon Ritual and birthing a being which will become a new Mulberry.

Many of the characters are either qualified or trainee onmyōji—referred to in the English version as exorcists—practitioners of mystical onmyōdō powers. A key character and antagonist is Ashiya Doman, an ambitious onmyōji who becomes fascinated by the Mulberry tree and the Kuon Ritual. The playable characters are Utsuki, Doman's daughter who lives near one of the Mulberry trees with her sister Kureha; Sakuya, an onmyōji-in-training and one of Doman's apprentices; and Abe no Seimei, a master onmyōji and Doman's rival.

=== Plot ===
The narrative is split into three parts; the "Yin" phase following Utsuki, the "Yang" phase following Sakuya, and the unlockable "Kuon" phase following Abe no Seimei. Utsuki and Kureha arrive at Fujiwara Manor from their home in search of Doman. Utsuki is soon separated from Kureha, and must defend herself from the many monsters roaming the grounds. Sakuya arrives with three of Doman's disciples, including her brother, to investigate the recent rumors of terrible incidents. As they investigate, Sakuya fights off the monsters, and two of the disciples are killed and corrupted by the monsters.

During their explorations, Utsuki and Sakuya find notes by Doman and members of the Fujiwara clan. It is revealed that when Kureha died in an accident for which Utsuki is presumed responsible, Doman was tempted by the Mulberries' twin spirits to subject Kureha to the Kuon Ritual, performed using a special chest. Doman also subjected members of the Fujiwara family to the ritual, with they and other victims returning as monsters. During her exploration, Sakuya burns one of the Mulberry trees. Utsuki is revealed to have already been absorbed by Kureha, with most of her narrative being a dream during her absorption. Utsuki awakes, struggling against Kureha's influence, and ends up absorbing Sakuya's older brother. Both reach the underground chamber where Doman's experiments were conducted, and despite the monstrous Utsuki attacking her, Sakuya vows to help her.

Alerted to Doman's actions, Abe no Seimei arrives and makes her way through the Fujiwara estate, coming across a wounded Sakuya, who begs Abe no Seimei to help Utsuki. Abe no Seimei also comes across a weakened Utsuki, who is momentarily calmed. Confronting Doman, he reveals his wish for Abe no Seimei to become the Kuon Ritual's ninth and final sacrifice. Abe no Seimei kills Doman, then the possessed Utsuki takes Doman's body and enters the prepared chest, beginning the final stage of the Kuon Ritual. Abe no Seimei seals the surviving Mulberry's power, but is stopped by Sakuya from killing Utsuki. Abe no Seimei leaves, warning Sakuya of the new being's potential for evil. During the credits, Sakuya coaxes the Kuon Ritual's child, a young girl resembling Utsuki, outside the Fujiwara grounds for the first time. They walk away together, leaving their futures uncertain.

== Development ==
Kuon was developed by FromSoftware, a company that made its name developing the King's Field and Armored Core series. The producer was Atsushi Taniguchi, who had previously worked on The Adventures of Cookie & Cream for PlayStation 2, and Lost Kingdoms for GameCube. The art director was Nozomu Iwai. Work on Kuon began following Lost Kingdoms II in 2003, with the target audience being people wanting a new approach to horror. Having previously handled dark adventure-based titles before, Taniguchi wanted to create his own take on that style using a traditional Japanese setting. Production was difficult and hectic, with the game going through unspecified production troubles. The weapon assignment for characters was intended to invert the typical precepts for their character styles; the weakly Utsuki used a knife, while the stronger Sakuya used a fan. The battle system was an evolution of the card system from Lost Kingdoms. The "tempest" and meditation mechanics were designed to produce unease, and while easy to implement were a later addition which threatened to disrupt the production schedule. Taniguchi put a lot of effort into creating an atmosphere of fear.

The Heian period setting was chosen due to its mystic presentation in Japanese culture and folklore, with multiple interlinked narratives which told a deep story within limited environments. The narrative took inspiration from kaidan, a type of Japanese ghost story. The numbers "four" and "nine" were included based on their unlucky reputation in Japanese culture, with the game's title having a plot-related double meaning of both "Nine Evils" and "Eternity". The storyline focused on female protagonists to promote a particular aesthetic, as many games of its kind focused on male protagonists. The historic onmyōji Abe no Seimei was included in the narrative, though the character was changed from a man to being a woman, keeping in line with the character goals. As Taniguchi wanted to create a sequel, the storyline ended on a cliffhanger. A notable outside contributor was artist Kyosuke Chinai, who created the cover and promotional artwork for Japan. Chinai was picked from a selection of artists, whose work was brought by different team members to find someone who drew with the right atmosphere for the game. Taniguchi contacted Chinai multiple times during production, persuading him to accept the collaboration. The CGI sequences, animation and motion capture was handled by Polyassets United.

== Release ==
The game was announced in an issue of Famitsu in September 2003. At this point, it was said to be 25% complete. The title was exhibited in the company stall during the 2003 Tokyo Game Show, alongside other titles including Shadow Tower Abyss, Armored Core: Nexus and Echo Night: Beyond. A live-action commercial was filmed at the Kannon-ji Temple in Setagaya. The staff were surprised when the temple priests agreed to the commercial, and some filmed scenes were direct recreations of scenes from the game. It released in Japan on April 1, 2004. Two different strategy guides were released by ASCII Corporation and Softbank Creative alongside the game.

A North American release was announced by Agetec in May 2004. Agetec was a regular Western publisher for FromSoftware's titles during this time. Their localization was designed to keep as much of the original game intact as possible, and included the original Japanese dub. It was released in the region on December 7, 2004. It was originally going to be released in the UK by Digital Jesters prior to the company's liquidation, with publishing duties assumed across Europe by Nobilis and Indie Games Productions. It released in the region on April 14, 2006. In the years since its release, the Western version has become a rare collectable, and the game itself obscure due to its limited coverage and rarity.

== Reception ==
Reception

Aggregate scores
Aggregator	Score
GameRankings	59%
Metacritic	57/100

Review scores
Publication	Score
1Up.com	C
Electronic Gaming Monthly	6.5/10, 4/10, 5.5/10
Eurogamer	4/10
Famitsu	28/40
Game Informer	6/10
GamePro	2/5
GameSpot	6.3/10
GMR	5/10

Kuon received mixed reviews from critics and journalists. The game was described as having "mixed or average" reviews according to the review aggregation website Metacritic, earning 57 points out of 100 based on 20 reviews. Similar contemporary website GameRankings gave the game a score of 59% based on 19 reviews.

When mentioned, the narrative and world design were praised. The gameplay saw mixed responses, with many finding the combat unenjoyable and the puzzle design outdated. The controls also met with general criticism due to lack of response, and noted its slow pace.

Jeremy Parish, writing for 1UP.com, noted its visual design as a standout compared to other titles in the genre, but otherwise found its gameplay derivative and uninteresting. Eurogamer's Marc McEntegart was disappointed overall, feeling that its horror elements were too conventional and generally criticised its gameplay and seemingly-wasted aesthetics. GamePro felt that the game as a whole was "dragged down" by mechanical and combat problems which had been with the genre since its early days. Game Informer enjoyed its atmosphere, but faulted its slow pace.

Electronic Gaming Monthly felt the game was let down by poor translation, and noted its archaic design compared to other titles of the day. Bethany Massimilla of GameSpot praised the aesthetic and narrative design, but found the gameplay generally lacking for either long-term play or replaying. David Chen from magazine GMR noted a lack of excitement or engagement with either standard gameplay or combat, and noted that its focus on Japanese folklore limited its audience.
