= Northern Undead Asylum =

Fictional location in the Dark Souls series

- Dark Souls location
- The Northern Undead Asylum as seen in Dark Souls
- First appearance: Dark Souls (2011)
- Created by: Hidetaka Miyazaki
- Genre: Action role-playing game
- Character: Oscar of Astora

The Northern Undead Asylum, also simply known as the Undead Asylum, is a fictional location and the starting area in the 2011 video game Dark Souls, created as part of the Dark Souls series by the game director Hidetaka Miyazaki and the development company FromSoftware. It is an institutional setting where the player character was imprisoned until a character named Oscar of Astora throws down a corpse with a key for the prison cell.

Upon progression through the level, the player encounters a gigantic tutorial boss called the Asylum Demon. After defeating the boss and escaping from the asylum, the player character is eventually taken to the game's main setting starting with a hub called the Firelink Shrine. The player character can optionally return to the undead asylum later, where they can fight another boss called the Stray Demon.

The Undead Asylum has been the subject of generally positive receptions by critics, who argued that it served as a very effective tutorial for players to get used to the game's mechanics, controls, and difficulty while giving them some freedom to determine how they want to approach the level. They have also noted that the aesthetics and purpose as a starting location for the player character fits in well with the overall dark and hostile tone of the game. By extent, the Asylum Demon was well-received as the tutorial boss due to his intimidating presence and introduction to fighting bosses throughout the game.

== Characteristics and appearance ==
Concept art of the prison cell of Northern Undead Asylum that the player character starts at. In the game, Oscar of Astora throws down a corpse with a cell key to free the undead character.

The Northern Undead Asylum is a major location of the 2011 video game Dark Souls, created by the Japanese game company FromSoftware and directed by Hidetaka Miyazaki. It is the game's starting area due to the player's undead character being imprisoned there. In the initial sequence, an individual named Oscar of Astora throws down a corpse, which the player character loots to collect a key and use it to unlock their prison cell. As they navigate through the first parts of the structure, the player character will encounter non-hostile undead enemies called "hollows", a glimpse of a giant demon guard, and the first bonfire that they can activate as an ingame checkpoint.

Upon pushing open the large double doors beyond the bonfire area, the player character enters a large, rectangular room full of hollows. They are then ambushed from above by a giant demon guard called the Asylum Demon, who serves as the game's first boss. The player can either attempt to kill him or escape via an exit to the room's left. Afterward, they will encounter more hostile hollows and a slowly hollowing Oscar, who will provide the player with healing items called "Estus Flasks".

When talked to, Oscar will advise the player to seek a faraway land and activate two Bells of Awakening. If the player has not yet killed the Asylum Demon, they will reenter the arena through a fog gate, where they can use a plunge attack against him. After defeating the Asylum Demon, players will have access beyond the gates and be taken to a location called the Firelink Shrine by a giant crow.

Later on, the player can choose to revisit the Northern Undead Asylum by visiting a bird's nest at the Undead Parish location, where a bird will take the player character there. Upon entering the room where the Asylum Demon was previously fought, the floor will break and cause the player character to fall into a lower room and engage in a boss fight against another giant demon called the Stray Demon. The player character can also obtain a special item called the Peculiar Doll from there from a corpse in a cell that can unlock a special area in Anor Londo called the Painted World of Ariamis.

According to Damien Mecheri and Sylvain Romieu, the Northern Undead Asylum was the final level to have been designed in Dark Souls so it could accurately reflect the overall game as a preceding tutorial sequence. The "cold and dark qualities" of the Dark Souls world were by extent brought into the location's design.

== Reception ==
The Asylum Demon has been praised as an imposing first impression for Dark Souls and a good tutorial boss, contributing to the positive receptions of the Undead Asylum.

The Northern Undead Asylum has been well-received by critics of Dark Souls, with the academic authors Adam Palmquist, Izabella Jedel, and Ole Goethe calling it a "well-crafted tutorial design" that, unlike traditional tutorial levels, puts players straight into an unforgiving game world with little guidance and forces them to adapt through trial and error. Because of the difficulty level of the asylum, a majority of Dark Souls players failed to escape the area and enter the Firelink Shrine.

Chris Urie of Arcade Sushi wrote that the Undead Asylum allows players to adjust to their environments like "a mewling child" as they test out controls for swinging their weapon and dodging attacks. He then noted the simplicity and straightforwardness of the dungeon as players can simply progress forward and be able to adjust to combat thanks to good enemy placements.

The NME writer Ewan Wilson expressed that there was a sense of historical inconsistency behind an asylum existing in a medieval-like world since the institutions only came into existence since the 19th century. At the same time, he found the symbolic idea behind the "regulated" and hollowed player character beginning as a prisoner at a place where people's bodies were classified and controlled significant. He then noted that the game pressures the player starting at the asylum, such as forcing them to manage their stamina bar and equip shields to protect themself from archers. Wilson continued that the asylum's "hostile" early 20th century style architecture is relatively consistent with those of other structures in the early game that all therefore represent an overall oppressive environment.

In a doctorate thesis for Uppsala University, author Marie Storm Dalby argued that the undead, including the player character, being locked up in the Northern Undead Asylum and therefore being isolated from the rest of the world to contain humanity with the intention of upholding the "Age of Fire" rule in Dark Souls connects to the reality of "social abjection" because of their outcast and lesser statuses based on the "Darksign" curse marking the undead. She also noted that while the player can choose to listen to Oscar of Astora's story through his dialogue and be given an Estus Flask (a healing item) and a key afterward that they can just alternatively kill him then collect his items, contrasting with other NPCs due to the player not being forced to make dialogue choices to progress to certain events.

Mohammad Fahmi Yahya and Pratiwi Retnaningdyah, writing for the academic journal Jentera: Jurnal Kajian Sastra, pointed out that Oscar was a tragic character due to his initial help in the player character's escape from the asylum followed by him dying and turning hollow upon the undead individual's second encounter with him. They suggested that he may have been fatally wounded by the Asylum Demon and himself became part of the prophecy that he could inform the player character about.

Other authors expressed similarly positive receptions for the Undead Asylum's bosses. Andi Hamilton of GamesRadar considered the Asylum Demon to be a good tutorial boss that his giant size, slow speed, and heavy damage are all essential elements for teaching players how to engage in boss fights. Jared Carvalho of GameRant highlighted the game tricking players into thinking that the Stray Demon, who can be seen by the player in the game's beginning, is the same guard as the Asylum Demon. He praised the boss for his upgraded versions of attacks previously performed by the Asylum Demon but criticized the arena design for causing players to take fall damage before engaging in the boss fight.

Dom Ford of IT University of Copenhagen, writing for Proceedings of the 15th International Conference on the Foundations of Digital Games, argued that new players, due to a combination of the small room filled with pillars and the giant boss both contributing to the limited player movement and them starting with the very weak Straight Sword Hilt, will likely end up dying to the boss the first time. The Asylum Demon, he argued, is intended to teach players that the game's bosses are difficult and will likely require multiple attempts to eventually defeat them, thus pressuring players into accepting that their player character will often die before success.

The player character being able to dodge the boss's attacks and escape the first time; find a better weapon; and eventually plunge their weapon onto the Asylum Demon from above, he said, encourages players to find tactics to overcome ingame obstacles. The undead asylum's boss, Ford continued, is an embodiment of the game's formula in which the player character dies easily to an enemy but persists and eventually kills them.
