= Slashy Souls =

2016 video game

- Developer: Bandai Namco Entertainment
- Publisher: Bandai Namco Entertainment
- Series: Dark Souls
- Platforms: iOS, Android
- Release: February 28, 2016
- Genre: Endless runner
- Mode: Single-player

Slashy Souls is an endless runner video game developed and published by Bandai Namco Entertainment as a GameStop-funded promotional tie-in to Dark Souls III. It was released for iOS and Android on February 28, 2016. The game was critically panned for its shallow gameplay, with reviewers expressing dismay that it was not a more fleshed-out idea due to the strong source material of the Dark Souls series.

== Gameplay ==
The game is an endless runner in which players must attempt to survive as long as possible while the game automatically scrolls ahead. The player, controlling a random adventurer, can use melee attacks and spells to defeat enemies in their way. The game also occasionally has bosses styled after those from the Dark Souls series. The further the player gets, the more their total score increases.

== Reception ==
Rob Rich of Gamezebo rated the game 2/5 stars, praising the game's pixel art but criticizing the gameplay as poorly done. In his review, he stated that the game "almost completely falls apart" when played, criticizing the game's lack of a tutorial or explanation for the controls. The game's hit detection was also noted as buggy, with many hits not connecting properly with enemies, and the game was mentioned as containing additional bugs, such as the death screen remaining there when it was restarted. He said that due to the connection with the Dark Souls series, he was "expecting something better".

Chris Carter of Destructoid rated the game 1/10, saying that it "disgraces the Souls name". Calling it "better left in the digital trash bin", he praised the control system as responsive, but remarked that every other aspect of the game was poorly done, with "no nuance". Saying there was "almost nothing authentic" about the game, he implored players not to blame FromSoftware for its creation.

Thomas Ella of Hardcore Gamer compared the game negatively to other tie-ins like Fallout Shelter, saying that the idea could be good if executed well, but that it was instead a "soulless cash-in". He also called the game "antithetical" to the Souls formula, since the main series games punish players for blindly running into danger, while Slashy Souls emphasizes it, and does not bother to duplicate core mechanics of the series, such as the "corpse run", in which players attempt to retrieve their Bloodstain. Sam Prell of GamesRadar+ called the game's callbacks to the Souls series "mostly superficial in nature", and noted that it did not have the "depth or satisfying combat" of a main series title.
