= Shadow Tower Abyss =

2003 video game

- Developer: FromSoftware
- Publisher: FromSoftware
- Producer: Toshifumi Nabeshima
- Designers: Takeyuki Kitazaki; Takeshi Sato; Hiroya Kimishima; Yui Tanimura
- Programmer: Tatsuyuki Sato
- Platform: PlayStation 2
- Release: JP: 23 October 2003
- Genre: Role-playing game
- Mode: Single-player

Shadow Tower Abyss is a role-playing video game developed and published by FromSoftware for the PlayStation 2. The game is a sequel to Shadow Tower and features a number of genre and mechanical elements that can also be found in Demon's Souls and the King's Field series. Shadow Tower Abyss was announced on 22 August 2001 and released in Japan on 23 October 2003. An English version was being developed by Agetec, but the project was cancelled by Sony Computer Entertainment America (SCEA), its publisher, prior to completion. A fan translation was released in 2011.

== Gameplay ==
Rurufon, a female non-player character, returns from Shadow Tower.

Shadow Tower Abyss is played entirely from the first-person perspective, and requires the player to navigate through a series of catacombs, caverns and open-air walkways in an effort to ascend the tower. There are numerous regions within the citadel, including subterrean forests, hellish caverns, waterfalls and temple-like chambers. While exploring, the player encounters a variety of friendly and aggressive characters, and collects keys, armour and up to 500 different weapons. Furthermore, the game features the ability to wield two weapons, a detail that allows players to easily switch between a handgun and a dagger, for example. Unlike Shadow Tower, the sequel does not feature a multiplayer mode.

The game world is populated with a total of 68 monsters and non-player characters, who "seem to have regular schedules and activities--that take place independent of [one's] actions--such as burning a bonfire and talking amongst themselves". The majority are aggressive and attack the protagonist on sight, while others provide information and serve to further the plot. During battle, players can sever segments of a creature's body with knives and decapitate them with carefully placed shots from their firearm. Indeed, the wings of aerial combatants can be targeted with a sniper rifle, causing them to plummet to earth when struck. Additionally, the game's Artificial Intelligence (A.I.) results in opponents often fleeing from the player when injured.

Typical to a number of games within the role-playing genre, Shadow Tower Abyss features a statistics-orientated character development system. Unusually, however, the protagonist does not gain experience points, but 'grows' by destroying the numerous denizens of the tower and harvesting their souls. Thus, over time the player will gradually become stronger and inflict comparatively more damage. This 'growth' mechanic is also found in the game's predecessor, and serves to encourage players to explore as much as possible. Hit points, which represent the life force of the player, and magic points, for casting spells, are determined by additional mental and physical attributes. Vitality, for example, directly affects the number of hit points, while Strength influences the maximum weight that can be carried. Break, Pierce and Slash each determine the damage done by the relevant melee weapon, whether it be a hammer, dagger, or an axe. In addition, certain items grant permanent or temporary bonuses to the player's attributes. A Soul Pod, for example, will grant the player an extra twenty points for any attribute, while the Symbol of Elements increases the magical Elements statistic by fifty percent for a brief period.

Although there are firearms spread throughout the game, ammunition is scarce, and the various melee weapons all have limited durability. If the player uses their axe excessively, for example, it will eventually deteriorate to the point of breaking. While replacement weaponry can be found in containers and retrieved from corpses, the game features a number of different shops, which are each represented by glowing crystalline structures: Merchants (green), Blacksmiths (purple) and Healers (red). 'Cunes' are the game's unit of currency, and are typically looted from cadavers. In addition, there are save points, which are represented by a cyan crystal.

== Plot ==
The game is set within the citadel first featured in Shadow Tower, and sees the return of a number of familiar non-player characters. The protagonist, an explorer, is in search of an arcane spear thought to have given great powers to the long-dead ruler of the kingdom, and ushered in an age of unrivalled prosperity. What remains of the kingdom today is largely covered over by the forest, save for the tower itself. Once inside the citadel, the protagonist encounters a mysterious Old Man, who traps him within and forces him to climb to the very top of the structure to escape.

== Development ==
Three years after the release of its predecessor, From Software announced Shadow Tower Abyss in 2001 and unveiled the game's website on 13 December 2002. A demonstration version, presented at the Tokyo Game Show between 26 and 28 September 2003, suggested that development was almost finished. Shadow Tower Abyss was the only role-playing game in From Software's stall, and the company's other ventures at the time included Otogi: Myth of Demons, Kuon, Armored Core: Nexus and Echo Night: Beyond.

While the Japanese release of Shadow Tower Abyss continued as planned, the English version was cancelled during the localisation stage. Mark Johnson, Agetec's producer, announced the cancellation on the SCEA website and stated that "for the most part the localization was completed, aside from package and manual". According to Johnson, the publisher had expressed concerns over its projected sales outside of its home market. Although Shadow Tower Abyss was ranked 14th overall and had been released mid-week, only 12,908 units were sold in Japan in the period from 20 to 26 October 2003. SCEA was also worried at the game's visual quality in comparison with its contemporary rivals within the role-playing and first-person genres. Johnson went on to say that the cancellation was "by far the hardest thing for me to accept and I did everything possible to fight for its release". A petition to SCEA was unsuccessful. Instead, Agetec went on to publish one of From Software's other games, Echo Night: Beyond, in the United States in 2004.

== Reception ==
The Japanese gaming publication Famitsu gave the game a score of 30 out of 40.

== Legacy ==
In 2009, From Software revisited the dark fantasy role-playing genre with the critically acclaimed Demon's Souls on the PlayStation 3 (PS3). As with Shadow Tower Abyss, Demon's Souls centres on the collection of the souls of the dead as a means of developing the statistics and equipment of one's character. Also like Abyss, Sony once again declined to publish Demon's Souls overseas, and instead publishing rights for the American release were obtained by Atlus. While IGN reported that the game had sold out in Japan, with 39,689 units shipped during its first week, the game also fared well in the United States with 150,000 units sold by October 2009 and 250,000 by mid-March 2010. Given its overseas performance, Yeonkyung Kim, a Sony employee responsible for localisation, remarked that the company's decision not to publish world-wide was "a mistake", and Demon's Souls should have "come out as a first-party title". As the spiritual successor to Shadow Tower Abyss and the King's Field series, the game received multiple accolades, obtaining a Metacritic score of 89.
