= Bonfire (Dark Souls) =

Video game mechanic

- Dark Souls franchise element
- A bonfire as it appears in Dark Souls
- Publisher: FromSoftware
- First appearance: Dark Souls
- Created by: Hidetaka Miyazaki

In-universe information
- Function: Checkpoint

The bonfire is a place of rest and form of in-game checkpoint for the player character in the Dark Souls series of action role-playing games created by Hidetaka Miyazaki and Japanese developers FromSoftware. Making its debut in the 2011 video game Dark Souls and reappearing in its sequels, Dark Souls II and Dark Souls III, bonfires take the appearance of a pile of ash and bones pierced by a coiled sword and emitting an orange flame.

Bonfires, which are scattered across many areas, serve as both a means to save in-game progress and as a utility area for leveling up, repairing gear, and replenishing a player's health, magic, and healing items, or "Estus Flasks". Resting at a bonfire will respawn most enemies, and, upon their death, players will return to the last one they previously used. According to Miyazaki, it was meant to serve utilitarian purposes and be an area to relax in an otherwise harsh fantasy world.

Since its debut, the bonfire has been the subject of positive reception by critics, who noted that it effectively served as a center of warmth and safety that players could grow attached to. It is considered one of the most iconic features of the Dark Souls series, and influenced the checkpoint mechanics of many other video games, as well as being placed as Easter eggs in games that may otherwise not use them.

== Characteristics ==
Bonfires serve as the in-game checkpoints of the Dark Souls series, a game trilogy produced by FromSoftware starting with the 2011 video game Dark Souls. The large fires are composed of bones plus ash and each contain a coiled sword in them. They radiate a warm and orange color within their area in distinct contrast with the other color schemes of their surrounding areas. When encountering a bonfire for the first time, the player can activate it and cause its flames to light up, leading them to save their progress in the area as a saved game. In the Dark Souls series, many of them are scattered throughout different locations and range from close proximity to each other to far away as to be scattered throughout different locations.

Upon use, bonfires also fully restore both health points and magic points. The limited supplies of "Estus Flasks," magical drinks that restore the player's health points when consumed, are also replenished. Upon death, the protagonist will respawn at the last bonfire they used without their accumulated souls, which serve as both in-game experience points and currency. The player must retrieve the souls in the area where they died, losing them permanently if they die again without recollecting them prior to death. The use of bonfire will also cause most slain enemies to respawn at their respective locations - only bosses and minibosses will not respawn. The ability for the player character to infinitely respawn at bonfires is explained as them being afflicted with a curse called the "Darksign."

The player can use bonfires to level up, upgrade in-game attributes, or repair their gear. They may also warp between bonfires to travel to different previously visited locations. In Dark Souls, warping between bonfires must be unlocked, while in the sequels, the ability is inherent for the player. In the first game, they can also obtain more Estus Flasks from bonfires by upgrading, or "kindling," them using items called "humanity." While the player is unable to kindle bonfires while in a "hollowed" state, an in-game mechanic that results from players lacking humanity pieces, they can reverse their hollowed state at bonfires.

In Dark Souls II, players can use an item called the "Bonfire Ascetic" at a bonfire to upgrade the surrounding area into a higher level of difficulty due to its New Game Plus level being increased by one. An individual upgrade causes bosses of an area to respawn and forces item pools there to reset. The individual area difficulty increases can be repeated but cannot be reversed.

In 2011, the Dark Souls series creator Hidetaka Miyazaki revealed via the PlayStation Blog that his favorite addition to the 2011 game was the bonfire, as he felt that it was flexible in what it could represent. He referenced its gameplay utilities and wanted it to be a place where players can "gather together and communicate – not verbally communicate, but emotionally communicate" with each other. He intended for the bonfires to serve as the centers of relaxation for players, noting its "heartwarming" tone in the midst of a "dark fantasy world".

== Appearances ==
Bonfires first appear as in-game checkpoints in Dark Souls, and later appear in the sequels Dark Souls II and Dark Souls III. The appearances of the checkpoints in the trilogy differ from those in the preceding FromSoftware soulslike game Demon's Souls and its 2020 remake, which take the form of "Archstones," and those in the subsequent games Bloodborne, Sekiro, and Elden Ring, which take the forms of "Lamps," "Sculptor's idols," and "Sites of Grace," respectively.

In 2017, YouTuber Sanadst uploaded an analysis video revealing leftover animations from Dark Souls III of the player character kneeling then using their weapon to grab into the ground. He theorized the animations were for a scrapped bonfire creation process based on the scrapped "Sacrifice Ceremonies" mechanic, which purportedly involved the player using an enemy's corpse to create a bonfire. This theory was followed by YouTuber Lance McDonald, who revealed the scrapped creation process of "cult bonfires" from enemy corpses via the "Cult Death" system. A cut bonfire variant involved a similar flame ignition process from an enemy sword but with the coiled "Ceremony Swords," allowing players to transform their worlds into "eclipsed states" enabling other players to invade for player vs. player interactions.

Bonfires play a major role as respawning centers in Dark Souls: The Board Game. Bonfires have also been featured as official merchandise in the form of a collector's statue with LED lighting that was sold under the Japanese brand Gecco.

== Reception ==
Since appearing in Dark Souls, the bonfire has been the subject of largely positive receptions, including for its visual design. Rock Paper Shotgun editor Alice O'Connor called it memorable and cool, feeling that it served as a temporary haven for the player. She also discussed how it made her nervous due to knowing that she was about to head into an unknown area. Electronic Gaming Monthly writer Nic Reuben focused more on the "ephemeral beauty" of the bonfire, claiming that its existence as "a hybrid between the ritualistic, somber yet Saturnalian bonfire, and the weary traveler’s respite represented by a campfire" is resonant with the greater themes of life and death in the Dark Souls series.

VG247 writer Kat Bailey also found wider literary themes regarding the bonfire as areas of "warmth and safety" for the player, saying that Dark Souls subverts common literary tropes of fires by making its bonfire "a signifier of solitude rather than companionship". The "image of a knight sitting cross-legged in front of a lonely fire" from Dark Souls, she highlighted, is "one of the iconic images of the series, and arguably gaming as a whole". Bailey expressed her sentiment that the popularity of campfires or similar imagery in later games was correlated with the influence of Dark Souls and referenced instances in which Yacht Club Games, the studio behind Shovel Knight, denied that its developers borrowed bonfire imagery from the 2011 game.

Edwin Evans-Thirlwell of Eurogamer agreed about the common feeling of hospitality from bonfires, noting that he was able to recall "that strange, airy, undulating note, more like the hum of a machine than the crackle of a blaze". Despite having noted the "chill" vibes of the bonfires, he also said that they still invoked the common in-game theme of the flame "as creator and destroyer".

Critics have praised bonfires as a well-executed in-game mechanic for the Dark Souls series, particularly as checkpoints. Christian Donlan of Eurogamer said that bonfires were his favorite concept in what he felt was a game with many creative ideas because they were the areas of making progress and served as bases to return to. He was confused at first why bonfires reset the world and respawn monsters upon usage, but appreciated progress resets being the costs of bonfires as the centers of rest.

Joe Donnolly of Vice called bonfires a central component of Dark Souls, emphasizing them as being like "receiving a badge of honor—the reason you're able to rest here is testament to what you've previously overcome." Ian Boudreau of PCGamesN concurred, but highlighted the increased difficulty and tension felt by the lack of any bonfire as a midway checkpoint for the Sen's Fortress location that threatened to reset the player's long progress in the level since their last save. Conversely, Vice writer Patrick Klepek expressed his indifference to bonfires as merely "fancy checkpoints," but agreed that they were important in pressuring the player to save their progress before they lose it unlike in most other modern games.

The gameplay execution of bonfires in the sequels were also criticized in some aspects. Patrick Klepek criticized Dark Souls 3 for its imbalanced "back-to-back" bonfire placements that he felt did not follow the "ebb and flow" rhythm of bonfire placements in the previous games, where tension and surprise are generated through the player's need for bonfires and unexpected encounters of them. Kotaku writer Robert Zak praised the lack of teleportation for much of the first Dark Souls, stressing that they were "symbolic Point[s] of No Return in Dark Souls" where the player faces increased tension for each bonfire they progress through, "eventually taking you to breaking point as you desperately wonder when the game will finally relent". As opposed to the execution of the bonfire mechanics in Dark Souls, he criticized the inherent presence of the warp method in the sequels for creating "uncomplex" feelings of "comfort without caveat, a complete break from the immersion and perils of a given area".

In contrast to the two previous authors who focused on criticizing bonfire mechanic changes after the first game, James Troughton of TheGamer gave praise to a specific in-game mechanic of bonfires in Dark Souls II, writing that the ability to increase the individual area's level of difficulty from New Game Plus is a well-executed instance of an "organically interwoven part of the game world" that gives players agency in influencing their surroundings. He voiced disappointment that the mechanic did not return in subsequent soulslike entries produced by FromSoftware.

The checkpoints of some recent video games outside of FromSoftware have been noted by gaming publication authors as parallel to the bonfires from the Dark Souls series due to the similar abilities to save the game and/or upgrade in-game features there, with Ian Boudreau reinforcing the idea that bonfires were one of the most well-received and copied ideas from the Dark Souls series. TheGamer editor Jade King went further in arguing that bonfires in the Dark Souls series were innovative as a mechanic to the extent that they became staples of so-called "soulslike" games. She emphasized that the success of bonfires is in part due to the little distinct lore attached to them, and that the why of their existence does not matter.

Writers have also noted that bonfires had elicited positive emotions and long-term iconicity from players. Jade King praised bonfires as the "physical manifestation of relief," since the player is "safe to catch [their] breath and celebrate that [they had] managed to make it this far". GamesRadar+ writer Matthew Elliott felt that, when compared to save points of other games, bonfires utilized in the Souls games were the "meaty cocktail of progress, exhaustion and joy". He argued that they elicited a range of emotions from the player depending on their situation, namely the simplistic and common feeling of gratefulness when newly encountering each one, that of numbness and contemplation when using a bonfire after completing a difficult boss battle, and finally the feeling of relief of encountering a save point after having navigated through overwhelming dungeons. He noted the recurring feeling of safety seeing the "distant flicker" of the flame and expressed contentment that the game titles almost always respected the concept of hospitality for bonfires.

Cameron Swan of Game Rant agreed that bonfires of the Dark Souls titles created a level of "emotional weight for the player" that other games failed to replicate. The author pointed out that the bonfire "always [comes] at the perfect time to rescue players at the very last minute" from active moments of death. He argued that even the other Soulsborne titles Bloodborne and Elden Ring failed to mimic the feelings of joy and comfort from the "sudden rush of flames, followed by the comforting crackle of the wood at its base" upon lighting a "warm and inviting" bonfire for the first time. The iconicity of the Dark Souls bonfires, he said, is demonstrated through its frequent appearances as Easter eggs for other games such as "Borderlands 2, Just Cause 3, The Witcher 3, Fallout 4, and even Overwatch".

Alberto Martín, writing for VidaExtra, followed Game Rant in emphasizing bonfires as popular Easter eggs in some of the aforementioned video games and Days Gone. He remarked that FromSoftware had achieved the impossible by turning the simple concept of a bonfire as an icon both within and outside of video games, stating that seeing fires in other video game worlds and even barbecues in real life could remind people of Dark Souls.

David A. Tizzard of The Korea Times said that the bonfire is "central mechanic of the game", where the player can choose to rest without shame for a moment of safety before seeking out the next one. In comparing the harsh difficulty of the Dark Souls world of Lordran to the South Korean capital of Seoul, he argued that the "bonfire" in real life can take multiple forms to different people including the coffee shop, "the pub, the noraebang, the running community, or the library". Tizzard said that the settings are "where everyone disappears and you remind yourself of who you are and what your purpose is" even amidst the culture that shames rest and glorifies burnout.
