= Metal Wolf Chaos =

2004 video game

- Japanese Xbox cover art
- Developer: FromSoftware (Note: Metal Wolf Chaos XD developed by General Arcade)
- Publishers: FromSoftware; Devolver Digital (XD)
- Director: Keiichiro Ogawa
- Producer: Masanori Takeuchi
- Designer: Kazuhiro Hamatani
- Programmer: Tatsuyuki Satō
- Artists: Masato Miyazaki; Tomoko Kamiyama; Kouji Iwayagano
- Composers: Kota Hoshino; Shohei Tsuchiya
- Platforms: Xbox; PlayStation 4; Windows; Xbox One
- Release: Xbox: JP: December 22, 2004; XD; PS4, Windows, Xbox One: WW: August 6, 2019
- Genre: Third-person shooter
- Modes: Single-player, multiplayer

Metal Wolf Chaos (Note: Japanese: メタル ウルフ カオス, Hepburn: Metaru Urufu Kaosu) is a third-person shooter video game developed by FromSoftware, released in 2004 in Japan for the Xbox. The player takes on the role of fictional U.S. President Michael Wilson piloting a mech to battle the rebelling military, led by fictional Vice President Richard Hawk. Wilson's mech can be equipped with up to eight weapons selected from a set of over a hundred. In each mission, the player battles through destructible environments, destroying all enemies they come across.

The Xbox's low popularity in Japan led Microsoft to team up with FromSoftware to develop a mecha game for the system. FromSoftware was primarily known at the time for the mecha combat series Armored Core. Since Microsoft was an American company, the team worked in extensive American context and cultural references. Despite the game only being released in Japan, it grew a cult following in the West due to its exaggerated themes of American patriotism. Publisher Devolver Digital released Metal Wolf Chaos XD, a remastered version of the game, for PlayStation 4, Windows, and Xbox One in August 2019.

== Gameplay ==
The player fires at an enemy.

Metal Wolf Chaos is a third-person shooter. The player takes on the role of Michael Wilson, the President of the United States, piloting an armored mech with a large arsenal of weapons, and must fight their way through destructible environments full of enemy infantry, tanks, and helicopters. The goal of each mission is to destroy all enemies, sometimes within a time limit. Each stage also has optional goals of rescuing a set of hostages and collecting energy pods. Saving hostages unlocks musical tracks for the game and special weapons, while the energy pods give the player additional shields for protection from enemy attack. The player can dash for quicker mobility, but excessive dashing drains shield power.

There are over a hundred unique weapons in the game, ranging from handguns to surface-to-air missiles, but only eight can be equipped at a time. Weapons are unlocked with money collected in each stage. Destroying enemies in quick succession generates a chain bonus, giving the player a higher score.

== Plot ==
By the end of the first quarter of the 21st century, the United States has plunged into a state of civil and economic unrest. The military launches a coup d'état, led by Vice President Richard Hawk, (Note: リチャード・ホーク, Richādo Hōku) and succeeds in gaining control of the nation's government institutions. During this time, Michael Wilson, (Note: マイケル・ウィルソン, Maikeru Wiruson) a fictional relative of Woodrow Wilson, is serving as the 47th President of the United States. (Note: 1UP.com compared the fictional Wilson relationship to the real life relationship of George W. Bush (President at the time) and his father, George H. W. Bush.) Wilson realizes he is the country's last hope for freedom, and he dons a special mech developed in secret by the military to fight Hawk and the rebel forces, aided by his secretary Jody Crawford. (Note: ジョディ・クロフォード, Jodi Kurofōdo)

Wilson flies aboard Air Force One to the west coast of the United States and begins to liberate cities and outposts, traveling from west to east across the country. After retaking the White House, Wilson pursues Hawk to Las Vegas, but Hawk escapes aboard a Space Shuttle and goes to a space station, planning to launch a nuclear missile at the United States in retribution. Wilson and Hawk battle in space, with Wilson ultimately defeating Hawk and saving the country from nuclear destruction.

== Development and release ==
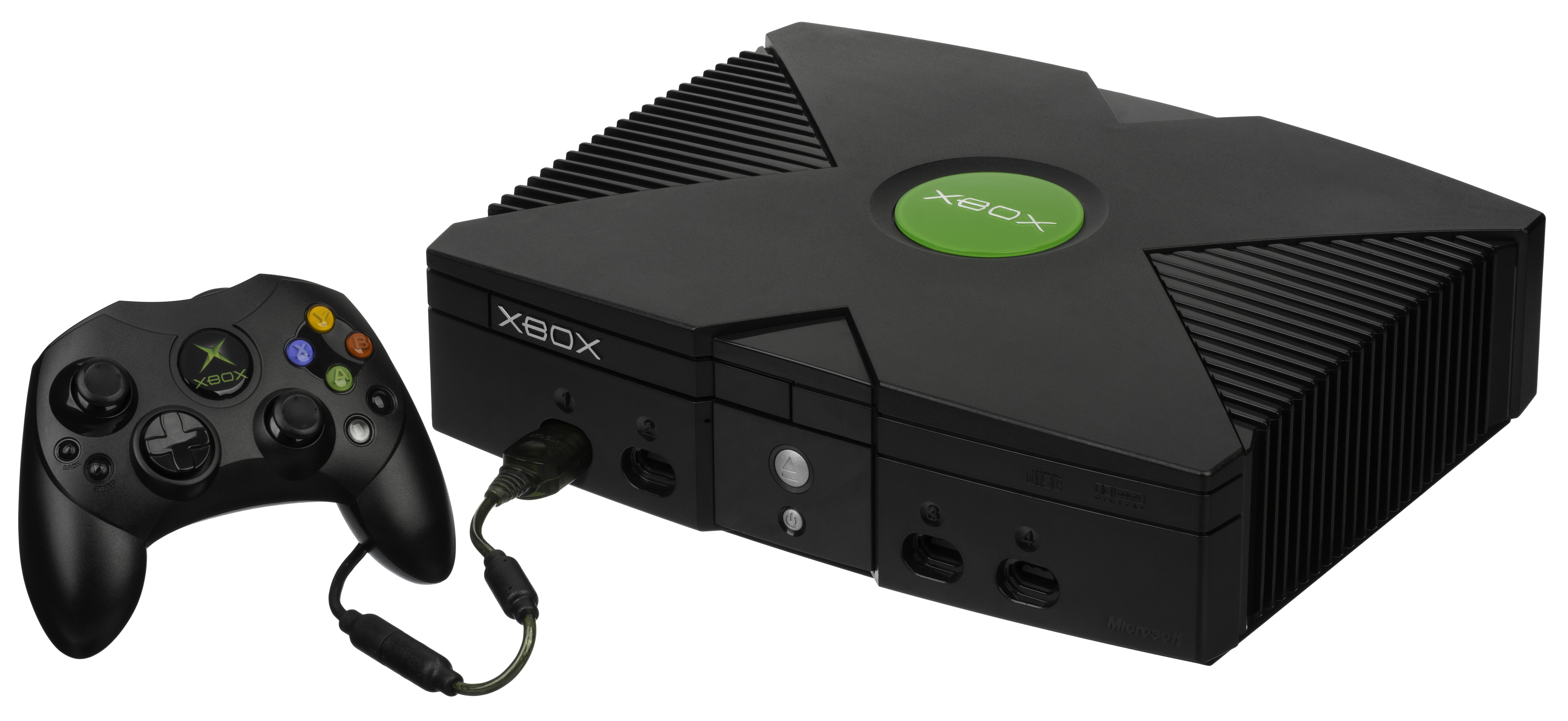
The struggling performance of the Xbox in Japan led to the creation of Metal Wolf Chaos.

External videos
- Behind the Schemes: Metal Wolf Chaos with FromSoftware — Devolver Digital interviews FromSoftware about Metal Wolf Chaos

In 2001, Microsoft released the Xbox console, which was successful in Western regions but had not gained a foothold in Japan or other Asian regions. In an effort to support the Xbox, Microsoft teamed up with FromSoftware to develop an exclusive mecha game for the system. FromSoftware was mostly known for its mecha combat series Armored Core at the time. Although they borrowed influence, the team did not want to recreate Armored Core. The game was developed by the team responsible for the Otogi games, while the Armored Core team provided input for how to incorporate mecha gameplay.

Since Microsoft was an American company, they wanted to develop something with an American theme, and decided on combining both Western and Eastern influences. They aimed to create a near future American setting. FromSoftware worked closely with the nearby Microsoft Japan offices, who provided some of the American context and humor. Despite the American cultural references, the game was still developed with a Japanese player base in mind. In an interview at E3 2019, FromSoftware producer Masanori Takeuchi recalled that they were looking to draw both American and Japanese audiences: "It is America as perceived by the Japanese. It's completely fictional, but at the time, it was our idea of this ideology of American culture and comic book heroes, and we pieced that together and it became the president piloting the mech. We think that when Japanese look at it that way, from the American point of view, it's almost like how they imagine a Japanese ninja, and sort of the same ideologies, the same kind of fantasy, so it goes two ways". A Microsoft employee suggested the name "Metal Wolf Chaos", with the idea being that a rhythmic three-word name would appeal to Western-focused audiences, like the American-inspired Metal Gear Solid series.

Metal Wolf Chaos took between eight and eleven months to develop by a team of 30 before being released in Japan on December 22, 2004. FromSoftware also released a soundtrack and modelguns in limited quantities to coincide with the release. The game did not sell as well as producer Masanori Takeuchi expected.

FromSoftware had the intent for worldwide localization, with a targeted North American release for 2005 with competitive Xbox Live multiplayer modes, and had gotten to the point of making available a secret playable demo of the Japanese version through a demo disc in issue 39 of Official Xbox Magazine. FromSoftware did not comment immediately on the reason the localization was canceled. Journalist John Sczepaniak believed the game's American satire and themes of terrorism may have given publishers cold feet. According to Zach Huntley of Kakehashi Games (the Japanese publisher working with Devolver Digital on the 2019 remaster), the game's long development period left its release near the end of the Xbox's lifecycle, and Microsoft was already shifting their focus to the Xbox 360. In 2018, FromSoftware confirmed that the political climate following the September 11 attacks led them to cancel localization. Takeuchi had expressed some remorse for not being able to provide the promised worldwide release for the game. Metal Wolf Chaos remained as part of a small selection of Japanese exclusives for the original Xbox system.

=== Remaster ===
Despite its limited regional availability, Metal Wolf Chaos grew a cult following. For years after its release, Takeuchi heard rumors about Westerners asking for the game, but did not know why they would want to play an old Xbox game not released in their region. In 2016, American publisher Devolver Digital posted a message on Twitter offering to help localize Metal Wolf Chaos. The fan reaction to the message prompted Takeuchi and FromSoftware to begin conversations with Devolver. The porting was handled by General Arcade, with consultation from Takeuchi and some FromSoftware staff. Also involved in the project was Kakehashi Games, a Japanese company that helps independent developers publish their games in Japan. The cross-functional team's priority was to release the game as it originally was, while upgrading visuals and potentially adding additional story missions.

A remaster of the original game was shown at E3 2018. The game features increased resolution and widescreen support, improved textures and visual effects, and some gameplay improvements. The original English voice acting remained. The game was targeted for release worldwide on Windows, PlayStation 4 and Xbox One in 2018, marking its first release outside Japan. The game was later delayed to August 6, 2019.

== Reception ==
Reception

Review scores
Publication	Score
1Up.com	B−
Famitsu	30/40

Metal Wolf Chaos XD

Aggregate score
Aggregator	Score
Metacritic	PC: 65/100; PS4: 63/100; XONE: 55/100

Review scores
Publication	Score
Destructoid	7.5/10
Eurogamer	Recommended
GameRevolution	2.5/5
GameSpot	4/10
IGN	5.5/10
Push Square	6/10
The Guardian	2/5

Brad Shoemaker (GameSpot) and Chris Carle (IGN) expressed their opinions of Metal Wolf Chaos based upon a demo they played at the 2004 Tokyo Game Show. Both praised the absurdity of the game's story, the frantic action, simple controls, and the destructible environments. Ryan Payton (1UP.com) reviewed the full game. He found the premise great, writing: "Chaos is presented as a satire of Saturday morning cartoon quality. The graphics, music, and characters' vernacular all drip of super-sized Americana, giving the game a surprisingly fresh and fun atmosphere". Although he agreed with the other sentiments shared by Carle and Shoemaker, Payton found that the game grew worse with repeated play. He felt that the combo system, which was designed to extend the game's longevity, was flawed due to glitches and interrupting gameplay tips from a sidekick. Reviewing the game in 2017, John Sczepaniak (Hardcore Gaming 101) found it to be a rich experience despite its simplicity, and a shame it was never released in the West. He called the writing "a work of absurdist genius", and praised the game's "intuitive arcade-style action" and "relentless style".

In retrospective coverage, the game is largely remembered for its exaggerated American patriotism. 1UP.com wrote that Metal Wolf Chaos as the most "insanely patriotic" game ever, Kotaku called it the most American game ever, and GameSpot considered it among the most American games of all time. Electronic Gaming Monthly ranked Michael Wilson first on their list of top ten video game politicians.

Metal Wolf Chaos XD has received "mixed or average reviews" on Metacritic.
