= EverGrace =

2000 video game

- North American cover art
- Developer: FromSoftware
- Publishers: JP: FromSoftware; NA: Agetec; EU: Ubi Soft, Crave Entertainment
- Director: Yuzo Kojima
- Producer: Masanori Takeuchi
- Programmer: Kiwamu Takahashi
- Artist: Junichiro Ishino
- Writer: Masanori Takeuchi
- Composer: Kota Hoshino
- Platform: PlayStation 2
- Release: JP: April 27, 2000; NA: October 26, 2000; PAL: January 19, 2001
- Genre: Action role-playing
- Mode: Single-player

EverGrace is a 2000 action role-playing game developed by FromSoftware for the PlayStation 2 (PS2). It was released in Japan in April 2000 by FromSoftware, North America by Agetec in October 2000 as a launch title for the PS2 in the region and PAL territories in January 2001 by Ubi Soft and Crave Entertainment.

The game received mixed reviews from critics, who praised its utilization of the console's features and concept, and criticism for its visuals and gameplay.

== Gameplay ==
Evergrace features two main characters, Darius the swordsman and Sharline the homemaker, with two distinct storylines and battle techniques. The game allows players to switch between characters at any save point, and uses an experience system dependent on items and equipment rather than statistical upgrades. Another feature is the Palmira Action System which allows players to improve the physical abilities of their characters by combining specialized crystals with their armaments.

Evergrace also features a bonus dungeon that is named after Shadow Tower, another game by FromSoftware, a company often known for including past game references in their games. The Moonlight Sword, for example, a weapon that originated in their flagship series, King's Field, also appears in Evergrace as well as its follow-up, Forever Kingdom.

== Plot ==
The continent of Edinbury once held the largest and most powerful empire of all time: the Rieubane Empire. This empire was primarily ruled by Morpheus, a powerful magician, and his servants and clients. Morpheus became devoted to studying the Crest, a series of markings on one's hand, and are considered cursed due to the misfortunes that happen to the Crestbearers. Morpheus was fascinated with the Crest and performed several experiments, thus creating the powerful Palmira Armaments and the man-made AI Crest. After capturing a renegade soldier who had the Crest, Morpheus ordered the Empire to invade Toledo, a nearby independent village in the Billiana forest, because they worshiped the Crest and were supposedly a threat to the balance of Rieubane. The Empire would never have agreed with Morpheus if they knew his real reason for invading the Toledans: simply to acquire more test subjects. In the end, the Empire effortlessly crushed Toledo, but as the flames grew higher, the Rieubane Empire, Toledo and the Human Research Lab suddenly and completely disappeared. People came to call Rieubane "the Lost Kingdom", and the land became overgrown with Billiana Trees. Hundreds of years later, four villages once part of the empire banded together to establish the empire of Fontraile, but this was not to last...

== Development ==
EverGrace was developed by FromSoftware and led by producer Masanori Takeuchi. The developer intended Evergrace to be released onto the PlayStation 2 (PS2) in its earliest stages of production. However, with these plans in place, the development team decided to try creating a version for the original PlayStation (PS1). About 50% of the PS1 version's assets including all its music had been completed before it was ultimately cancelled. Despite the PS1 version performing well in the company's quality assurance meetings, many staff members questioned if the project should just transition to Sony's new console. When the decision was made to move the project to the PS2, the programming, modeling, animation, textures, and soundtrack all had to be redone from scratch. As the new console had yet to be released itself and the developer lacked an understanding of its power, development consisted largely of trial-and-error. Takeuchi claimed that many of the ideas the team had could not be realized on the PS1 hardware. The PS2's enhanced processor allowed the implementation of character facial animation, subtle animation for fabric and hair, and more detailed graphics when equipping an avatar. Sharline, who had been cut as playable character in the PS1 version, was reintroduced due the PS2's ability to display more polygons and thus a more realistic female figure.

The soundtrack for the game was created by FromSoftware's in-house band FreQuency and chiefly composed by Kota Hoshino. Prior to the conception of Evergrace, Hoshino wanted to create a unique kind of sound he could keep to himself. He expressed gratitude to the game's developers for allowing him the freedom to express this vision through the game's musical score. Takeuchi had been told that there were very few technical differences between the PS1 and PS2 and with the PS1 soundtrack for Evergrace already completed, he said that the team tried simply inserting this music into the nearly-finished PS2 version. The producer asked the sound team to improve the audio fidelity, but they found the songs themselves did not fit the new version, so the music was completely reworked alongside the rest of the game. Hoshino stated that voices are used as the primary "instrument" for the game's sound. Hoshino recorded samples of his own voice and edited them with Soundforge, then recorded more voice samples to create what he considered to be an ethnic sound. Japanese instruments such as the shakuhachi and the shamisen were also added, while all of the percussion was synthesized.

== Reception ==
Reception

Aggregate score
Aggregator	Score
Metacritic	59/100

Review scores
Publication	Score
Electronic Gaming Monthly	6.5/10 (Note: Three critics of Electronic Gaming Monthly gave the game each a score of 6.5/10, 5.5/10, and 7.5/10.)
Famitsu	28/40
Game Informer	7/10
GameFan	59% (Note: In GameFan's viewpoint of the Japanese import, three critics gave it each a score of 60, 57, and 59.)
GameSpot	5.2/10
IGN	7.2/10
Jeuxvideo.com	12/20
Next Generation	2/5
PlayStation Official Magazine – UK	2/10
Official U.S. PlayStation Magazine	2/5
RPGFan	36/100

EverGrace received "mixed" reviews according to the review aggregation website Metacritic. IGN praised the game for its innovations, including its full use of the DualShock controller buttons and the unique "paper doll" system in which the player's avatar actually wears the armor and clothing assigned to it. GameSpot criticized the game for its dated visuals and laggy gameplay during battles. Steven Frost of NextGen said, "EverGrace's 32-bit beginnings really hurt its ability to provide a true next-generation experience. Only die-hard RPG fans will have the patience and persistence to finish this adventure." In Japan, Famitsu gave it a score of two sevens, one eight, and one six for a total of 28 out of 40.

2 Barrel Fugue of GamePro said in an early review, "If you're looking for an RPG that takes character customization to new levels, and you're willing to accept some old with that new, then Agetec's EverGrace might just be the accessory you need to go with that fresh PS2." (Note: GamePro gave the game three 4/5 scores for graphics, control, and fun factor, and 3/5 for sound in one review.) In another review, the same author later said, "In the end, if it's an RPG you want, it's an RPG you'll get with Evergrace. Dress-up and role-playing have always gone hand in hand, but you may want to try this game on as a rental first—just to see if it fits." (Note: GamePro gave the game three 4/5 scores for graphics, control, and fun factor, and 3.5/5 for sound in another review.)

According to Famitsu, the game debuted on Japanese sales charts at fifth place, selling 75,083 units. It fell to seventh place the following week, selling an additional 11,886 units. After continuing to fall on the charts, the game sold 134,865 units in the region by the end of 2000.
