= Dark Souls II: The Lost Crowns =

2014 video game

- Promotional artwork of the first DLC in the trilogy, Crown of the Sunken King
- Developer: FromSoftware
- Publisher: Bandai Namco Entertainment
- Director: Yui Tanimura
- Composers: Yuka Kitamura; Motoi Sakuraba
- Series: Dark Souls
- Platforms: Windows, PlayStation 3, Xbox 360, PlayStation 4, Xbox One
- Release: Crown of the Sunken King; July 22, 2014; Crown of the Old Iron King; August 26, 2014; Crown of the Ivory King; September 29, 2014
- Genre: Action role-playing

Dark Souls II: The Lost Crowns is a set of three downloadable content packs for the 2014 action role-playing game Dark Souls II. The first of the trio, Crown of the Sunken King was released in July 2014 and was followed by Crown of the Old Iron King in August and Crown of the Ivory King in September. The DLC, developed by FromSoftware and published by Bandai Namco Entertainment, were met with positive reception and drew praise for returning to the complex interlocking and looping level design of Dark Souls.

== Background ==
Before Dark Souls II was released, Bandai Namco producer Takeshi Miyazoe said that there was potential for downloadable content depending on fan reception. According to Yui Tanimura, one of the game's directors, work on the downloadable content began directly after the base game was completed. Early design meetings led to the decision to make the trilogy as varied as possible, and this was facilitated by the freedom of not being bound by Dark Souls II's overarching story. Director Yui Tanimura also decided to emphasize discovery in the DLC and take advantage of the experience players developed from going through the base game. On June 4, 2014, The Lost Crowns was officially announced. Each DLC was available for individual purchase or as a complete season pass. All three installments of the trilogy received positive reviews, and, thanks to a deliberate effort to employ level designs unlike anything found in Dark Souls II, some critics considered the new content an improvement on the base game.

== Plot ==
The story of Dark Souls II involved an abyssal entity known as Manus shattering into numerous fragments. These fragments gained individual awareness and began to hunger for power. One of these pieces adopted the appearance of a queen and journeyed to a foreign land to manipulate its king into a war, leading to the primary conflict of the game. The plot of The Lost Crowns focuses on three more such autonomous fragments who set off to various kingdoms in search of control.

== Crown of the Sunken King ==
Crown of the Sunken King takes the player to a set of subterranean, Aztec-styled temples.

The first part of The Lost Crowns downloadable content trilogy, Crown of the Sunken King, was released on July 22, 2014. It received positive reviews and was regarded as an improvement over Dark Souls II's level design.

=== Setting and gameplay ===
Crown of the Sunken King takes place in a large, green-hued cavern with vast stepped pyramids that bear resemblance to Aztec temples. Matt Kamen of The Guardian said that the DLC features "some of the most disturbing yet beautiful locations seen on a current generation console". The DLC saw an increase of environmental puzzles when compared to its host game and previous entries in the series; large architectural segments slide and rotate and rise, switches that reward observant players are hidden around the level, and traps abound. These shifting elements can sometimes be used to eliminate enemies, protect the player, or access hidden items, lending the DLC a slow, more experimental and contemplative pace that the designers wanted to impart a sense of true exploration. The physical level design of Crown of the Sunken King departed from Dark Souls II's relatively linear style, returning to a more considered, interconnected layout with areas that loop back and feature many shortcuts. There is also an emphasis on vertical design in the DLC (something that would be used to greater effect in the following chapter, Crown of the Old Iron King), which some critics found refreshing and others found frustrating.

Many of the hazards in Crown of the Sunken King rely upon a poison mechanic that, if triggered, drains the player's health over time. One notable adversary emits a poisonous haze that afflicts the player if they engage in close combat, incentivizing a switch in style of play. This forced reconsideration is a common element in the DLC's enemies and traps, emphasizing methodical action. Crown of the Sunken King features three boss encounters, one of which is optional and set after a difficult challenge path. The final boss, an impaled and poisonous dragon named Sinh, was created as the "linchpin" of the level's harsh atmosphere. In the DLC's story, dragon worshipers constructed the temples around Sinh, and a different sect of cultists invaded and inadvertently woke the dragon. Up to that point, Sinh had been absorbing all of the world's subterranean poisons, but, upon waking, it released the buildup and effectively desolated the city.

=== Critical reception ===
Reception

Aggregate score
Aggregator	Score
Metacritic	PC: 82/100; PS3: 83/100; X360: 80/100

Review scores
Publication	Score
Eurogamer	8/10
GameSpot	8/10
The Guardian	4/5
Polygon	8.5/10
PC Gamer	85/100
VideoGamer	8/10

Crown of the Sunken King received "generally favorable" reception, according to review aggregator Metacritic. Simon Parkin of Eurogamer praised the DLC's level design and visuals, calling it a "strong start for this series of add-on chapters". Writing for GameSpot, Miguel Concepcion compared the complexly interwoven layout of the DLC to the design of the original Dark Souls (2011), writing, "Crown of the Sunken King's standout exploratory design and abundance of engaging enemy encounters make it a terrific adventure, though a hair short of being essential." Brett Phipps of VideoGamer appreciated how the DLC was "free of nods to the past" and noted the quality and difficulty of combat encounters. Phipps criticized some of the level design, though, citing the increased verticality as somewhat detrimental to the experience. Official Xbox Magazine wrote, "It may be tough, but Crown of the Sunken King delivers some of the series' best, most intricate level design so far." Matt Kamen of The Guardian called the DLC "a welcome update to Dark Souls II, then, although with two chapters yet to arrive, perhaps a bit light on overall content." Writing for PC Gamer, Cory Banks considered the DLC a tremendous value and favorably noted its consistent challenge. Polygon's Dave Tach called Crown of the Sunken King an "indispensable expansion" that represents "Dark Souls at its best".

== Crown of the Old Iron King ==
Promotional artwork for the second DLC in the trilogy, Crown of the Old Iron King

The second part of The Lost Crowns downloadable content trilogy, Crown of the Old Iron King, was released on August 26, 2014. It received positive reviews and was praised for its unique setting and unusual vertical layout.

=== Setting and gameplay ===
Crown of the Old Iron King is set on a massive, ash-dusted tower with a foundry at the base and an exposed throne room at the top. It is a fantastical area with giant suits of hanging armor that double as elevators and with vast plains of hardened ash from which enemies emerge. The player begins the DLC on a nearby mountain and is faced with a giant chain bridge that leads to the upper level of the isolated tower. Following a precarious crossing, much of the chapter comprises descending the spire and gradually unlocking its various areas. Like the previous DLC, Crown of the Old Iron King emphasizes attention to environmental details and cautious gameplay, but this time to best combat encounters rather than solve puzzles. The tower is complex, with numerous floors and side areas and with a layout that requires backtracking and skillful navigation. Several critics appreciated the area's design and visuals.

The enemies in Crown of the Old Iron King are powerful and tend to appear in groups. Like the poison-emitting enemies in Crown of the Sunken King, this DLC offers adversaries with mechanics that force the player to slow their attack and adapt. For instance, there is a large, iron-clad enemy that discharges damaging lava from its side, alternating between right and left at intervals; this design and others promote well-considered and deliberate movement on the player's part. Crown of the Old Iron King features three bosses, the primary of which dwells at the bottom of the tower and is surrounded by objects that heal him. These objects can only be destroyed with items found throughout the DLC, again emphasizing the importance of exploration.

=== Critical reception ===
Reception

Aggregate score
Aggregator	Score
Metacritic	PC: 79/100; PS3: 83/100; X360: 82/100

Review scores
Publication	Score
Eurogamer	8/10
GameSpot	8/10
PC Gamer	80/100
Polygon	8/10

Crown of the Old Iron King received "generally favorable" reception, according to review aggregator Metacritic. Writing for Eurogamer, Simon Parkin praised the unique setting and visual design, calling it "arguably more memorable in terms of both its foes and vistas" than Crown of the Sunken King. He did note that the DLC was relatively brief. Miguel Concepcion of GameSpot wrote, "What is noteworthy about Crown of the Old Iron King is how it conveys a deep sense history without the help of a flashback. Its slumbering defenses await your arrival, just as they have for countless heroes before and for those who'll follow in your footsteps." Official Xbox Magazine called the DLC "a confident step up from the already impressive first part and a tantalising taste of what's still to come." Polygon's Dave Tach still appreciated the DLC, but he found its difficulty frustrating at times. Ultimately, Tach concluded that Crown of the Old Iron King takes an investment of time and effort but is worth it. Conversely, Cory Banks of PC Gamer found the DLC to be "easier than we'd hoped", but praised the rewarding exploration.

== Crown of the Ivory King ==
Promotional artwork for the third DLC in the trilogy, Crown of the Ivory King

The conclusion of The Lost Crowns downloadable content trilogy and of Dark Souls II at large, Crown of the Ivory King, was scheduled to be released on September 24, 2014, but was delayed until September 30. It was released a day early on PC and a day later on PS3. The DLC received positive reviews and was seen as a fitting sendoff for the game.

=== Setting and gameplay ===
Crown of the Ivory King sees the player exploring a sprawling frozen city, Eleum Loyce, with a centralized cathedral-castle and a surrounding parish. Besides one small optional area in Dark Souls, this DLC is the series' first major winter area. Upon first entering the level, visibility is low and much of the city is obscured by frosty fog and rime; hardened ice chunks and glaciers dot the landscape, containing frozen enemies and treasures. After navigating a long, curving rampart and a series of snowy courtyards, the player lifts the blizzard, both clarifying visuals and opening up these previously trapped elements to create a new experience upon backtracking. The DLC's overall level design is more linear than that of the previous two, but that is offset by the profusion of hidden secrets. As with the two previous DLCs, Crown of the Ivory King continues the trend of thoughtful level design coupled with environmental puzzles and creative enemies.

Upon first entering the city, the player is faced with either going along the wall to the left or right. Immediately to the left is the DLC's first of three bosses, a white tiger that begins invisible and is later revealed by acquiring an item. The player can beat the boss early and bypass a large portion of the level, but to do so is very difficult. Another instance of this unusual design can be seen in Crown of the Ivory King's titular final boss who can be challenged very early in the DLC. The boss proves virtually undefeatable without the aid of knights that the player recruits throughout the level. Because these knights are optional and scattered apart from each other, the concluding challenge has a self-paced element; the more followers are rallied, the easier the final battle becomes. Marty Sliva of IGN called this final encounter "a massive, exciting battle that unfolds with a scope larger than any boss fight in the series."

=== Reception ===
Reception

Aggregate score
Aggregator	Score
Metacritic	PC: 82/100; PS3: 87/100; X360: 83/100

Review scores
Publication	Score
Eurogamer	8/10
Eurogamer Germany	9/10
GameSpot	9/10
PC Gamer	85/100
USgamer	4/5

Crown of the Ivory King received "generally favorable" reception, according to review aggregator Metacritic. Simon Parkin of Eurogamer appreciated the unusual final boss design of the DLC and how it gave the chapter a "unique pace" that "upsets Dark Souls II's now familiar structure". Writing for GameSpot, Miguel Concepcion lauded the DLC and said, "Crown of the Ivory King is a melancholic victory lap in the only way a Dark Souls game can present a finale." Official Xbox Magazine wrote that the final entry in the trilogy takes advantage of the series' systems and mechanics in an admirably creative way. PC Gamer's Ben Griffin concluded that the DLC was high quality and solid, but low on content. Bob Mackey of USgamer wrote, "If you've been playing through Dark Souls 2 DLC up to this point, Ivory King offers plenty of reasons to see the last of what FromSoftware has to offer," and favorably called the setting "atypical for a Souls game". Hardcore Gamer's Adam Beck considered Crown of the Ivory King the best of the trio, but was disappointed that there was no grand conclusion. Several critics especially praised the DLC's final boss and the way it inspires a style of play which was previously unusual in the series.
