= Yoshitsune Eiyūden: The Story of Hero Yoshitsune =

2005 video game

- Developer(s): FromSoftware
- Publisher(s): FromSoftware
- Producer(s): Atsushi Taniguchi
- Designer(s): Yuki Yamagishi; Kazushi Morita; Satoshi Shoda
- Programmer(s): Yasushi Umehara
- Artist(s): Ikuko Matsui; Naomi Fujikawa
- Composer(s): Ayako Minami; Yuji Kanda; Koichi Suenaga
- Platform(s): PlayStation 2
- Release: JP: January 13, 2005
- Genre(s): Hack and slash, real-time strategy
- Mode(s): Single player, multiplayer

Yoshitsune Eiyūden: The Story of Hero Yoshitsune (義経英雄伝 The Story of Hero Yoshitsune, "Heroic Saga of Yoshitsune") is a hack and slash video game developed and published by FromSoftware for the PlayStation 2, based on the legendary samurai Minamoto no Yoshitsune.

The game was re-released with additional content (such as characters and levels) and two-player cooperative or competitive modes. This new version was titled Yoshitsune Eiyūden Shura (義経英雄伝修羅) (shura meaning "mayhem" or "carnage").

== Gameplay ==
Developers described the game as a cross between real-time strategy games and typical third-person 3D action games. The game displays a 3rd person view of the area surrounding the player in a real-time strategic setting, similar to Koei's Dynasty Warriors. There are many stages in which the goal is to guide the troops safely across the battlefield while protecting them.

== Reception ==
In the week of its release, Yoshitsune Eiyūden: The Story of Hero Yoshitsune was the third best-selling console game in Japan, with 41,927 copies sold.
