= Shadow Tower =

1998 video game

- North American cover art
- Developer: FromSoftware
- Publishers: JP: FromSoftware; NA: Agetec
- Producer: Shinichiro Nishida
- Designers: Daisuke Ito; Hiroyuki Kani
- Programmer: Hiroyuki Arai
- Composer: Kota Hoshino
- Platform: PlayStation
- Release: JP: June 25, 1998; NA: November 23, 1999
- Genre: Action role-playing
- Modes: Single-player, multiplayer

Shadow Tower is a 1998 action role-playing video game developed by FromSoftware for the PlayStation. The game was originally released in Japan by FromSoftware on June 25, 1998 and in North America by Agetec on November 23, 1999. Shadow Tower shares many similarities with the King's Field series of video games. A sequel, Shadow Tower Abyss, was released for the PlayStation 2 exclusively in Japan.

== Gameplay ==
Shadow Tower is an action-oriented dungeon crawl very similar to King's Field. It features a first person style of gameplay where the player engages in combat with enemies, searches for hidden items and traps, and interacts with NPCs. Unlike most RPGs, it does not feature a system of experience points which the player character uses to grow more powerful. Instead all creatures are non-respawnable and every type of enemy killed will raise fixed stats on the player, so in order to increase specific stats a variety of different enemies need to be killed. The game also includes an item which allows the player to increase any stat by a few points manually, allowing for some character customization. A common issue for new players is that stat names don't refer to what they might be used to from other RPGs; for example, the stat Strength doesn't affect the character's attack power, but their hit points instead. Each piece of the character's equipment has a durability rating, meaning that it will wear down over time and must eventually be repaired or replaced. The game also features no music and no automap. Some differences from the previous King's Field installments are a shield that acts as an actual usable item that must be raised to block attacks, a more in-depth equipment screen, and the new progression system.

== Plot ==
The game is set on the continent of Eclipse, in the Holy Land of Zeptar. The player takes the role of a mercenary named Ruus Hardy. Returning home to Zeptar, he finds that the entire city, as well as the central tower, have been sucked into the underworld. He meets an old man who gives him the Dark One's sword, the only weapon which can injure the demons responsible. Swearing to rescue the old woman who raised him, as well as the rest of Zeptar, Ruus descends into the underworld.

== Development and release ==
Shadow Tower was developed by FromSoftware, a Japanese game company that had made its name with the King's Field series, with which Shadow Tower shared several gameplay and thematic elements. While it bears several tonal and mechanical similarities to the King's Field series, the team wanted to create an entirely different franchise. The aesthetics were inspired by Western fantasy, while the goal with the gameplay was to have it difficult yet rewarding for players. It used a similar engine base to the King's Field series, though it was redesigned and polished. The game was produced concurrently with Echo Night, and had some crossover with the sound staff. The game's soundtrack was composed by Kota Hoshino. As the game uses little in-game music, many of his contributions were unused, though some were later used for Evergrace. It was originally published by FromSoftware in Japan on June 25, 1998. The game was localized and published by Agetec, who had previously released multiple FromSoftware titles.

== Reception ==
Reception

Aggregate score
Aggregator	Score
GameRankings	49%

Review scores
Publication	Score
AllGame	2/5
CNET Gamecenter	3/10
Electronic Gaming Monthly	2/10
Famitsu	27/40
Game Informer	7.5/10
GamePro	2.5/5
GameSpot	3.9/10
Official U.S. PlayStation Magazine	0.5/5
PlayStation: The Official Magazine	3.5/5
Dengeki PlayStation	90/100, 80/100, 75/100, 90/100

The game received an average of 49% according to the review aggregation website GameRankings. In Japan, Famitsu gave it a score of 27 out of 40.
