= The Duskbloods =

Upcoming 2027 video game

- Developer: FromSoftware
- Publisher: FromSoftware
- Director: Hidetaka Miyazaki
- Platform: Nintendo Switch 2
- Release: 2027
- Genre: Action game
- Mode: Multiplayer

The Duskbloods (Note: Japanese: ダスクブラッド (Dasukuburaddo)) is an upcoming multiplayer action game by FromSoftware for the Nintendo Switch 2. Directed by Hidetaka Miyazaki, development began for the original Nintendo Switch before the project shifted to the Switch 2 for release in 2027. Online matches support up to eight players and combine player versus player (PvP) and player versus environment (PvE) combat. Players control Bloodsworn, characters empowered by special blood, each with distinct weapons and abilities.

== Setting ==
The Duskbloods is set during the "Twilight of Humanity", an event in which the Bloodsworn are summoned from different times and places to compete for "First Blood". The Bloodsworn are player-controlled characters who have gained superhuman abilities through special blood. The game therefore has no fixed era or location.

== Gameplay ==
The Duskbloods is a multiplayer action game that features player versus player (PvP) and player versus environment (PvE) gameplay for up to eight participants. Players choose from over a dozen Bloodsworn—vampire-like characters, each possessing unique weapons, including firearms, and abilities—to compete across various maps. Players can customize their characters in a dedicated hub area. Lore fragments are integrated into character customization items, specifically within each character's "blood history and fate", which reveals details about the game world. By customizing a character's blood history and fate, players can adjust attributes such as abilities, appearance, and characteristics, as well as their in-game role. These roles assign specific responsibilities and objectives during matches. For example, the Destined Rivals role requires a player to find and defeat a designated rival, while the Destined Companion role tasks a player with seeking out a designated ally, earning a special reward. Each character can summon an entity to assist in combat. An event system may dynamically influence matches by introducing elements such as special enemy spawns and additional objectives that offer bonus rewards. Players earn Victory Points, which determine the outcome of a match, through direct combat or more strategic actions. Online matches generally use a last-player-standing format, although some use alternative victory conditions, such as defeating a boss enemy. Upon completion, players receive rewards, regardless of the outcome, which can be used for character customization.

== Development and release ==
FromSoftware met with Nintendo to discuss ideas and presented a rough outline for The Duskbloods. Director Hidetaka Miyazaki described the proposal as a loose collection of ideas rather than a formal presentation. Nintendo expressed interest, and a FromSoftware team began developing the game for the original Nintendo Switch. After Nintendo approached the studio about the Nintendo Switch 2, development shifted to the new hardware, which allowed FromSoftware to focus more on online play while remaining closer to its original vision.

Although inspired by vampires, the Bloodsworn are not depicted as traditional horror monsters. The developers drew on romantic aspects associated with vampires and blood when designing the characters, who are collectively known as the Duskbloods. The game's maps include Gothic- and Victorian-style environments, as well as settings inspired by the closing years of the early modern period. Miyazaki said the game's combination of player versus player and player versus environment elements offered varied design possibilities while drawing on FromSoftware's experience creating challenging enemy encounters.

The game was announced in April 2025 as a Nintendo Switch 2 exclusive and was scheduled for release in 2026, but delayed to 2027. In February 2026, KADOKAWA said that Nintendo and FromSoftware would share sales responsibilities on a regional basis. A network test took place from August 21–24, 2026.
