= Eternal Ring =

2000 video game

- North American cover art
- Developer: FromSoftware
- Publishers: JP: FromSoftware; NA: Agetec; EU: Ubi Soft / Crave
- Producers: Akinori Kaneko; Toshifumi Nabeshima
- Designers: Hiroyuki Kani; Eisuke Sakurasawa
- Programmer: Ryuji Okamura
- Writers: Toshifumi Nabeshima; Eiji Matsumoto
- Composers: Keiichiro Segawa; Tsukasa Saitoh
- Platform: PlayStation 2
- Release: JP: March 4, 2000; NA: October 26, 2000; EU: December 22, 2000
- Genre: Action role-playing
- Mode: Single-player

Eternal Ring (Note: Eternal Ring (エターナルリング, Etānaru Ringu)) is a first-person action role-playing game developed by FromSoftware and published in North America by Agetec. Released in 2000, it was a launch title for the PlayStation 2 both in Japan and North America. The game was made available via emulation for the PlayStation 4 in North America on May 23, 2017.

== Gameplay ==
The player controls Cain Morgan, a young magician who is sent to investigate the Island of No Return, where a legendary artifact called the Eternal Ring is presumed to be held. The island is home to a large number of mythical creatures, including dragons, lizard men, and gargoyles, and is the location of magical gems and rings, including the Eternal Ring. The game is played in a First person view.

A unique feature of the game is the use of magic rings, imbuing these magic rings with a combination of different gems creates rings that both allow the use of magic spells and also boost the player's attributes. Although the game also features knives and swords which can be acquired, the most powerful attacks come from magic rings which are the game's focus. A gauge indicates charge time for magic spells.

Found on the island are strangely powered gems each having one of six elements. Elements include Fire, Water, Earth, Wind, Light, and Darkness. When creating rings, the powers instilled in the rings will differ according to the gem's element, among other factors. Each gem has a level, with the weakest being a level 1 gem (excluding Light and Dark gems, which are found starting at level 3) that cannot be modified. The highest level of each gem is level 5. Gems are found at increasing levels as the game progresses.

=== Ring creation system ===
There are four types of magic rings which can be found or created on the island. Attribution Rings affect statistics (including Cain's strength and his attributes for each element). Attack Magic Rings grant an offensive ability, for example they may create some sort of projectile or lay a trap on the ground. Summon Magic Rings are a subtype of offensive rings and are used for manifesting massive power. Auxiliary Rings cannot be created and have an assortment of generally passive effects, ranging from slowing time to increasing experience gain. Assist Magic Rings grant helpful abilities, such as protection or healing. "Magic Rings" can be found throughout the island in chests and scattered in random places. These rings are used in creating Attack, Summon, and Assist Magic Rings.

Attribution Rings are created seemingly at random based on the gems used. They cannot be made into other rings as is possible with Magic Rings and cannot be discarded.

Creating rings is an important part of Eternal Ring as it allows the acquisition of powers that ease the course of combat. Most early battles would be very difficult to survive without the aid of Magic Rings. Access to the ring creation system is granted as soon as you encounter a teleport pad, which will bring you to a magician who will "pass down the knowledge of the ancients."

Two ingredients are necessary to create Attack and Assist Rings (and summon rings): Magic Rings and Magic Gems both of which can be found scattered throughout the island. In the gem placement screen there is a left, blue background side and a right, green background side. Both of these sides have three places to set gems. During the creation of an Attack or Assist ring, the left determines the element of the ring and the right determines whether the ring is Attack or Assist. Summon Rings may be created by using six gems of the same element whose levels total 24–30.

When creating Attribution Rings, a Ring of Magic is unnecessary and the attributes are determined by the elemental properties of the gems. Only two elements can be used in an Attribution Ring thus it is a waste of material to place a third or more. There exist many combinations for creating rings that have magic spells. Each of the fire, water, earth, and wind elements can produce 4 different rings, each a different level of an Attack or Assist ring in addition to 2 different summon rings. Light and Dark may produce only 3 different Attack rings and 2 different Assist rings each, and 2 levels of summon rings each(light and dark have no cross elemental attribution rings).

== Reception ==
Reception

Aggregate score
Aggregator	Score
Metacritic	62/100

Review scores
Publication	Score
AllGame	3/5
Electronic Gaming Monthly	5.5/10 (Note: Three critics of Electronic Gaming Monthly gave the game each a score of 6/10, 3.5/10, and 7/10.)
Famitsu	25/40
Game Informer	7.5/10
GamePro	4.5/5
GameRevolution	D+
GameSpot	6.3/10
IGN	6.5/10
Next Generation	2/5
Official U.S. PlayStation Magazine	2/5
PlayStation: The Official Magazine	5/10

The game received "mixed" reviews according to the review aggregation website Metacritic. Jeff Lundrigan of NextGen called it "the first RPG available for the system, and you could do worse. You could do a lot better though." In Japan, Famitsu gave it a score of one seven, one six, one seven, and one five, for a total of 25 out of 40, noting its good graphics and innovative ring creation system, but stating that the game had an overall rushed feel to it and that it could have spent more time in development.
