= Mobile Suit Gundam Unicorn (video game) =

2012 video game

- Developer: From Software
- Publisher: Namco Bandai Games
- Platform: PlayStation 3
- Release: JP: March 8, 2012
- Genre: Action
- Mode: Single-player

Mobile Suit Gundam Unicorn is an action game developed by From Software and published by Namco Bandai Games for the PlayStation 3. The game is based on the first three episodes of the anime adaptation.

== Gameplay ==
The game features a "Sub Flight" system, where the character-in-control can climb atop a Mobile Suit to initiate its transformation into flight form. The transformations occur seamlessly in real-time.

== Plot ==
=== Story ===
The game consists of several different but intertwined arcs, with each assuming the perspectives of the respective characters. Completing one character's arc will unlock another character's arc.

Banagher Arc
Told through the perspective of the protagonist, Banagher Links. In this arc, the player will be piloting the RX-0 Unicorn Gundam, alternating between "Unicorn Mode" and "Destroy Mode".

Frontal Arc
Told through the perspective of the antagonist, Full Frontal. In this arc, the player will be piloting Full's personal machine, the MSN-06S Sinanju.

Marida Arc
Told through the perspective of Neo Zeon female ace pilot, Marida Cruz. In this arc, the player will be piloting Marida's NZ-666 Kshatriya.

=== Characters ===
Banagher Links (バナージ・リンクス, Banāji Rinkusu)
Voiced by: Kōki Uchiyama

Full Frontal (フル・フロンタル, Furu Furontaru)
Voiced by: Shuichi Ikeda

Marida Cruz (マリーダ・クルス, Marīda Kurusu)
Voiced by: Yuko Kaida

== Development ==
According to Famitsu, From Software has been paying a lot of attentions to details, from the exterior appearances to the weight of the Mobile Suits, in order to make them feel as real as possible. From Software is also trying bring the immersion of speed to player as much as possible. Sunrise has commented that they were surprised at the impressive level of details of the Mobile Suit recreations.

As of November 2011, the development process was at 70% completion.
