= Dark Souls =

Video game series

- Genre: Action role-playing
- Developer: FromSoftware
- Publisher: Bandai Namco Entertainment: JP: FromSoftware
- Creator: Hidetaka Miyazaki
- Composers: Motoi Sakuraba; Yuka Kitamura
- Platforms: PlayStation 3, Xbox 360, Windows, PlayStation 4, Xbox One, Nintendo Switch
- First release: Dark Souls; September 22, 2011
- Latest release: Dark Souls: Remastered; May 24, 2018

Dark Souls (Note: Japanese: ダークソウル, Hepburn: Dākusōru) is a dark fantasy action role-playing game series developed by FromSoftware and published by Bandai Namco Entertainment. Created by Hidetaka Miyazaki, the series began with the release of Dark Souls (2011) and has seen two sequels, Dark Souls II (2014) and Dark Souls III (2016). It has received critical acclaim, with its high level of difficulty being among its most discussed aspects.

The first Dark Souls is often cited as one of the greatest games of all time, and the other two games have garnered similarly laudable reputations in critical circles, although the fanbase remains divided to this day on the trilogy's second entry. The series had shipped over 39 million copies worldwide as of 2025. Other FromSoftware games, including Demon's Souls, Bloodborne, Sekiro: Shadows Die Twice, and Elden Ring, share several related gameplay and story concepts, and thus led to the creation of the Soulslike subgenre. Demon's Souls (2009) was the first of all these games, and the Dark Souls trilogy are considered spiritual successors to Demon's Souls, through their common use of beings' souls as a currency (however they notably do not canonically connect). Demon's Souls, in turn, had been inspired by prior FromSoftware RPGs like King's Field.

== Setting and Narrative ==
Set within the haunted lands of Lordran, Drangleic, and Lothric, respective to each entry, the games place the player in fights against knights, dragons, phantoms, demons, and other monstrous or supernatural entities. Battling for souls and cycles of item accretion, loss, and recovery, are central to each's narrative and gameplay. Dark Souls games parallel one another in their often gloomy and decrepit environments, their overarching cyclic stories centering around fire and its extinguishing, and common themes about corruption and rebirth. Recurring plot points include exchanges with suspect religious figures, casting off phantoms, avenging innocents slain, and grave encounters with demons. At the end of each game, the player character decides whether to burn themselves as fuel to reignite the primordial "first flame" that brought nearly everything into existence, or allow it to fade and die out; a world-shaping choice that, mysteriously, others have made before - evidently keeping the fire lit each time, as it is still alive in each game.

== Gameplay ==
The Dark Souls games are played in a third-person perspective, and focus on exploring interconnected environments while fighting enemies with weapons and magic. Players battle bosses to progress through the story, while interacting with non-playable characters. The protagonist of each Dark Souls game can have a varying gender, appearance, name, and starting class via character creation - there is no real "canonical" gender or appearance of any of the playable characters, as their appearance and personalities matter little in the grand scheme. Upon starting each game, players can choose between classes, including knights, barbarians, thieves, and mages; as well as a totally unequipped class called "Deprived," which starts with each of the games' stat points at an equal level. Each class has its own starting equipment and attributes that can be tailored to the player's experience and choices as they progress. The player gains souls from battles, which act as both experience points to level up, and as currency to buy items. Souls gained are usually proportional to the difficulty of fighting certain enemies; the more difficult an enemy, the more souls the player will gain from defeating it.

One of the core mechanics of the series is the use of how it handles progress, death, and player improvement. Bonfires serve as a checkpoint within the series, restoring all health and other critical resources when used, but also respawning most enemies and obstacles, making repeated trips back to safety untenable for forward progress. Upon losing all of their health points and dying, players lose their souls and appear back at the bonfire where they last rested (in games after Dark Souls, this extends to the last bonfire that was lit by the player, if more recent than a rest at a fire). If the player can return to their point of death - their bloodstain - without dying again, they can regain all lost souls.

If the player dies again before reaching their bloodstain, the souls are permanently gone. Notably, using a bonfire manually and respawning at one after death have identical effects, except for the player losing their currency at their place of death, which can be retrieved with no penalty. In this way the player is encouraged to not fear death, as no progress is lost so long as they can learn from their mistakes. As the player retraces their steps after death, they will naturally defeat more enemies, gaining more souls and allowing their character to gain experience alongside the player themselves.

Online interaction in the Dark Souls games is integrated into the single-player experience. Throughout areas of the game, players can briefly see the actions of other players as ghosts in the same area that may show hidden passages or switches. When a player dies, a bloodstain can be left in other players game world and when activated can show a ghost playing out their final moments, indicating how that person died and potentially helping other players online to avoid the same fate in advance. Players can leave messages on the ground that can help other players with tips and warnings. Multiplayer can be engaged in both player versus player combat and cooperative gameplay using invasion or summoning mechanics. Players can also rely on covenants, which serve as "factions" that can allow players to delve further into the multiplayer experience.

== Games ==
Release timeline
2011	Dark Souls
2012	Dark Souls: Prepare to Die Edition
2013
2014	Dark Souls II
2015	Dark Souls II: Scholar of the First Sin
2016	Dark Souls III
2017	Dark Souls III: The Fire Fades Edition
2018	Dark Souls: Remastered

=== Dark Souls ===
Dark Souls is the first game in the series; it is considered a spiritual successor to Demon's Souls (2009). FromSoftware wanted to develop a sequel to Demon's Souls, but Sony's ownership of the intellectual property prevented them from doing so on other platforms. It was released in 2011 for PlayStation 3 and Xbox 360. In 2012, Dark Souls: Prepare to Die Edition was released for Windows, PlayStation 3, and Xbox 360, featuring the base game and the Artorias of the Abyss downloadable content.

The game takes place in the fictional kingdom of Lordran. Players assume the role of a cursed human character who escapes from the Northern Undead Asylum and sets out to discover the fate of undead humans like themselves. The plot of Dark Souls is primarily told through environmental details, in-game item flavor text, and dialogue with non-playable characters (NPCs). Players must piece together clues in order to understand the story, rather than being told the story through more traditional means, such as through cutscenes. Dark Souls and its predecessor Demon's Souls garnered recognition due to the series' high level of difficulty. A version featuring some graphical and gameplay enhancements, Dark Souls: Remastered, was released in May 2018, although with mixed review being criticised for a number of reasons. like the price being double compared to the original release, the original and remastered PC versions not being sold together, and the original version being removed from stores.

=== Dark Souls II ===
Dark Souls II was first announced in late 2012 during the Spike Video Game Awards. This is the only game in the series where director Hidetaka Miyazaki did not reprise his role, although he was still involved in supervision. It was released in 2014 for Windows, PlayStation 3, and Xbox 360. In 2015, an updated version featuring The Lost Crowns downloadable content was released for Windows, PlayStation 3, Xbox 360, PlayStation 4, and Xbox One, under the title Dark Souls II: Scholar of the First Sin - with the latter two platforms receiving retail releases, although it received some criticism for various reasons like the original and Scholar of the First Sin pc versions not being bundled together and the paid PC update for Scholar of the First Sin being too expensive. The game takes place in the kingdom of Drangleic, where the player must find a cure for the undead curse. Although set in the same universe as the previous game, there is quite little direct story connection to Dark Souls.

=== Dark Souls III ===
Dark Souls III was released in 2016 for Windows, PlayStation 4, and Xbox One. The gameplay is paced faster than previous Souls installments, which was attributed in part to the gameplay of Bloodborne. The game takes place in the kingdom of Lothric, where the player is faced with the choice to link the flame and prolong the age of fire, or let the flame die out and end the cycle completely.

In 2017, the complete version containing the base game and both expansions, Ashes of Ariandel and The Ringed City, was released, under the title Dark Souls III: The Fire Fades Edition. Dark Souls III was both critically and commercially successful, with critics calling it a worthy and fitting conclusion to the series. Criticisms included the game being overpriced and not having the addons for free after awhile.

It sold over 10 million copies by 2020, making it the fastest-selling game in Bandai Namco's history at the time, until the record was beaten by Elden Ring. In 2015, Miyazaki said that Dark Souls III would likely be the last of the series, with FromSoftware choosing to move onto new games of unrelated IPs in the future.

== Other media ==
Cover art for the first issue of the Dark Souls comic book

A comic book by Titan Comics based on the series debuted alongside the release of Dark Souls III in 2016. A Kickstarter campaign for a licensed board game by Steamforged Games, Dark Souls: The Board Game, was also announced around the same time. The campaign was funded within the first three minutes of its launch and was released in April 2017.

In February 2017, music from the series by Motoi Sakuraba was performed by a live orchestra at the Salle Pleyel concert hall in Paris. In September of that year, a limited edition vinyl box set containing the soundtracks of all three games was released in Europe. In Japan, a box set containing the enhanced versions of all three games for the PlayStation 4, the soundtracks for each, bookends, artwork prints, and dictionaries detailing every in-game item was released on May 24, 2018. The romanticism of Dark Souls III setting has been the topic of analysts, emphasizing the sublime aspects it draws.

== Related games ==
=== Demon's Souls ===
Released in 2009 for the PlayStation 3, Demon's Souls is considered the spiritual predecessor to the Dark Souls series. It has also been described as a spiritual successor to the King's Field series of games, while at the same time being described as a separate entity "guided by differing core game design concepts." It also drew inspiration from video games such as Ico, The Legend of Zelda, and FromSoftware's Otogi: Myth of Demons, as well as manga such as Berserk, Saint Seiya and JoJo's Bizarre Adventure.

Unlike its successors, Demon's Souls uses a central hub system known as the "Nexus" where players can level up, repair equipment, or buy certain items, before venturing into one of the five connected worlds. The "World Tendency" feature is also exclusive to Demon's Souls, where the difficulty of exploring a world is dependent on how many bosses have been killed, and how the player dies. The gameplay involves a character-creation system and emphasizes gathering loot through combat with enemies in a non-linear series of varied locations. It had an online multiplayer system integrated into single-player, in which players could leave messages and warnings for other players' worlds, and join other players to assist and/or kill them. After FromSoft extended the server's lifecycle past the original 2011 shutdown date, the multiplayer component was finally taken offline in early 2018.

=== King's Field ===
The King's Field series, also developed by FromSoftware, is considered a spiritual predecessor to the series. It debuted in 1994 with King's Field for the PlayStation and had three sequels.

=== Slashy Souls ===
In February 2016, Bandai Namco Entertainment partnered with American retailer GameStop to release Slashy Souls, a free-to-play mobile endless runner, to promote Dark Souls III. The game was presented in a pixel art style, and shares the series' level of difficulty. The game was met with highly negative critical reception, with reviewers such as Chris Carter of Destructoid and James Stephanie Sterling both giving the game a 1/10.

== Reception ==
Aggregate review scores
Game	Year	Metacritic
Dark Souls	2011	PC: 85/100; PS3: 89/100; X360: 89/100
Dark Souls II	2014	PC: 91/100; PS3: 91/100; X360: 91/100
Dark Souls III	2016	PC: 89/100; PS4: 89/100; XONE: 87/100
Dark Souls: Remastered	2018	NS: 83/100; PC: 84/100; PS4: 84/100; XONE: 87/100

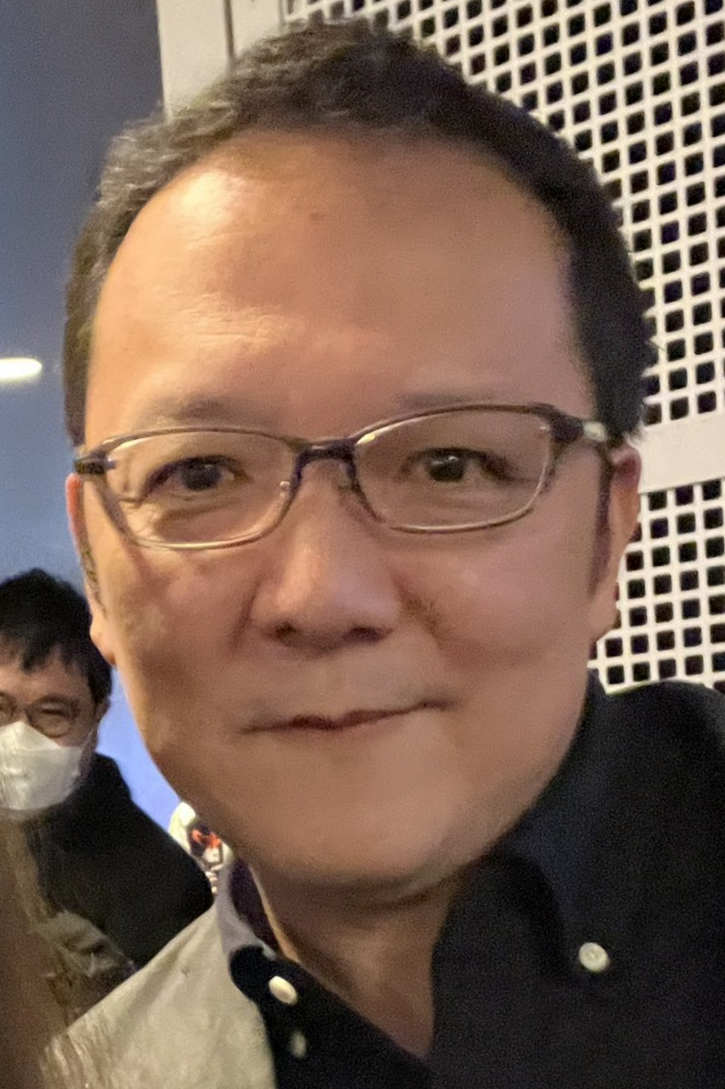
Hidetaka Miyazaki, creator of the series and director of Dark Souls and Dark Souls III

The Dark Souls series has been met with critical acclaim, with the first game often being cited as among the greatest video games of all time.

The "bloodstain" gameplay mechanic has been given praise by critics. David Craddock of Shacknews called them one of the core tenets of the series. He stated that the harshest punishment one can receive in a Souls game is "not dying once, but twice."

GamesRadar+ called bloodstains, in combination with Demon Souls's message system, "a graceful, elegant way of letting players guide each other without the need for words", and said that "rarely has the price of failure been balanced on such a precarious knife edge" as being forced to retrieve one's bloodstain.

The bonfire concept was similarly praised. Matthew Elliott of GamesRadar+ called bonfires a powerful symbol of relief, and "a meaty cocktail of progress, exhaustion and joy", and that, while other games evoke emotions with their save points, no other game does so as effectively. Vice called the Bonfire a "mark of genius" that "reinvented the save point" and allowed the player to reflect on their progress.

=== Sales and legacy ===
As of 2024, the Dark Souls series had shipped 37.33 million copies outside of Japan. Dark Souls III broke sales records upon release, selling over three million copies worldwide by May 2016 and was Bandai Namco's fastest-selling game until being surpassed by Elden Ring in 2022.

The Soulslike genre was inspired by common features of the series, resulting in many games using similar mechanics. Other FromSoftware games directed by Miyazaki, such as Demon's Souls, Bloodborne, Sekiro: Shadows Die Twice, and Elden Ring, share many of the same concepts of Souls and are often associated with the series and grouped under the "Soulsborne" label.

The series has also been cited as an influence on several PlayStation Network features, including asynchronous messaging, social networking, and video sharing, as well as for the television show Stranger Things.
