= Dark Souls III =

2016 video game

- Developer: FromSoftware
- Publisher: Bandai Namco Entertainment: JP: FromSoftware
- Directors: Hidetaka Miyazaki; Isamu Okano; Yui Tanimura
- Designers: Shigeto Hirai; Yuya Kimijima; Hiroshi Yoshida; Junya Ishizaki
- Programmer: Takeshi Suzuki
- Writer: Hidetaka Miyazaki
- Composers: Yuka Kitamura; Motoi Sakuraba
- Series: Dark Souls
- Platforms: PlayStation 4; Xbox One; Windows
- Release: PlayStation 4, Xbox One: JP: March 24, 2016; WW: April 12, 2016; Windows: WW: April 12, 2016
- Genre: Action role-playing
- Modes: Single-player, multiplayer

Dark Souls III (Note: Japanese: ダークソウルIII, Hepburn: Dāku Sōru Surī) is a 2016 action role-playing game developed by FromSoftware and published by Bandai Namco Entertainment. Released for the PlayStation 4, Xbox One, and Windows, it is the third and final entry in the Dark Souls trilogy. The game follows the Ashen One, an unkindled warrior, on a quest involving the Lords of Cinder and the fading First Flame. It is played from a third-person perspective, and players use weapons, armour, magic, shields, and consumables to fight enemies. Series creator Hidetaka Miyazaki returned as a director after directing Dark Souls I and having a supervisory role on Dark Souls II.

Dark Souls III received generally positive reviews and was commercially successful, with critics describing it as a fitting conclusion to the series. It shipped over three million copies by May 2016 and had surpassed 10 million in sales by May 2020. It won several awards, including Ultimate Game of the Year at the 2016 Golden Joystick Awards and Role-Playing/Massively Multiplayer Game of the Year at the 20th Annual D.I.C.E. Awards. Two downloadable content expansions, Ashes of Ariandel and The Ringed City, were released in 2016 and 2017, respectively. A compilation version, Dark Souls III: The Fire Fades Edition, containing the base game and both expansions, was released in April 2017.

== Gameplay ==
The player character facing the Ancient Wyvern, a boss character

Dark Souls III is an action role-playing game played from a third-person perspective. The player controls a customizable character who explores interconnected areas, fights enemies and bosses, and rests at bonfires, which function as checkpoints. Defeating enemies earns souls, which are used as both currency and experience points. If the player dies, the player's carried souls are dropped at the place of death; they can be recovered by returning to that location, but are lost permanently if the player dies again before retrieving them.

Combat is based on managing health, stamina, and focus points (FP). The player can fight with melee weapons, bows, shields, throwable items, and magic; shields can block or deflect attacks, while dodge-rolling allows attacks to be evaded. Weapons have standard and strong attacks, and some attacks can be charged. Dark Souls III introduces weapon and shield "Skills", special abilities that vary by equipment and consume FP. Stamina limits actions such as attacking, blocking, and dodging, leaving the player vulnerable when depleted.

Magic, miracles, pyromancies, and Skills consume FP rather than a fixed number of uses. FP can be restored with Ashen Estus Flasks, while regular Estus Flasks restore health; the player can choose how many flask uses are assigned to each type.

Compared with Dark Souls II, the game has faster combat and movement while retaining defensive options such as shields. The game has fewer overall areas than Dark Souls II, but they are larger in scale; many areas also include shortcuts that connect routes back to bonfires. Its expanded character builder and weapon options were designed to support more varied play styles. Online multiplayer returns from previous games in the series, allowing players to summon others for cooperative play or encounter hostile players through invasions.

== Plot ==
Dark Souls III is set in the kingdom of Lothric, where the First Flame, which sustains the Age of Fire, is fading. To prevent the coming Age of Dark, a champion must link the fire by sacrificing themselves to rekindle it. Prince Lothric, who was chosen for this task, refuses to do so. In response, a bell tolls and awakens the Lords of Cinder, previous champions who linked the fire in earlier ages. Most of them abandon their thrones at Firelink Shrine, leaving only Ludleth of Courland behind.

The player character, known as the Ashen One, is an Unkindled: an undead warrior who previously failed to link the fire. The Ashen One is resurrected and tasked with returning the Lords of Cinder to their thrones. They defeat the Abyss Watchers, a legion of warriors sworn to fight the Abyss; Yhorm the Giant, a ruler who once linked the fire for his people; Aldrich, a cleric who became a Lord of Cinder after devouring others; and Prince Lothric, who is protected by his elder brother Lorian.

After the Ashen One returns the Lords' cinders to their thrones, they travel to the Kiln of the First Flame. There, they defeat the Soul of Cinder, a manifestation of those who previously linked the fire. Depending on the player's actions, the Ashen One may rekindle the First Flame, allow it to fade, or claim its power for themselves.

=== Ashes of Ariandel ===
In Ashes of Ariandel, the Ashen One meets Gael, a slave knight who asks them to enter the Painted World of Ariandel. The painted world is decaying, and some of its inhabitants believe it must be burned away so that a new world can be created. Sister Friede, who has taken control of the world, opposes this and persuades Father Ariandel to prevent the flame from spreading.

The Ashen One defeats Friede and Father Ariandel, causing the Painted World to begin burning. A young painter thanks the Ashen One for showing her flame and says that Gael has gone to find a pigment she can use to paint a new world.

=== The Ringed City ===
In The Ringed City, the Ashen One travels to the Dreg Heap, a collapsed landscape where ruined kingdoms from different eras have converged at the end of the world. Following Gael's trail, the Ashen One reaches the Ringed City, an ancient city associated with the Pygmies, the ancestors of humanity.

After awakening Princess Filianore, the Ashen One is transported to an ashen wasteland, where they find Gael seeking the blood of the Dark Soul for the painter in Ariandel. The Ashen One defeats Gael and gives the Blood of the Dark Soul to the painter, who uses it to begin creating a new painted world.

== Development and release ==
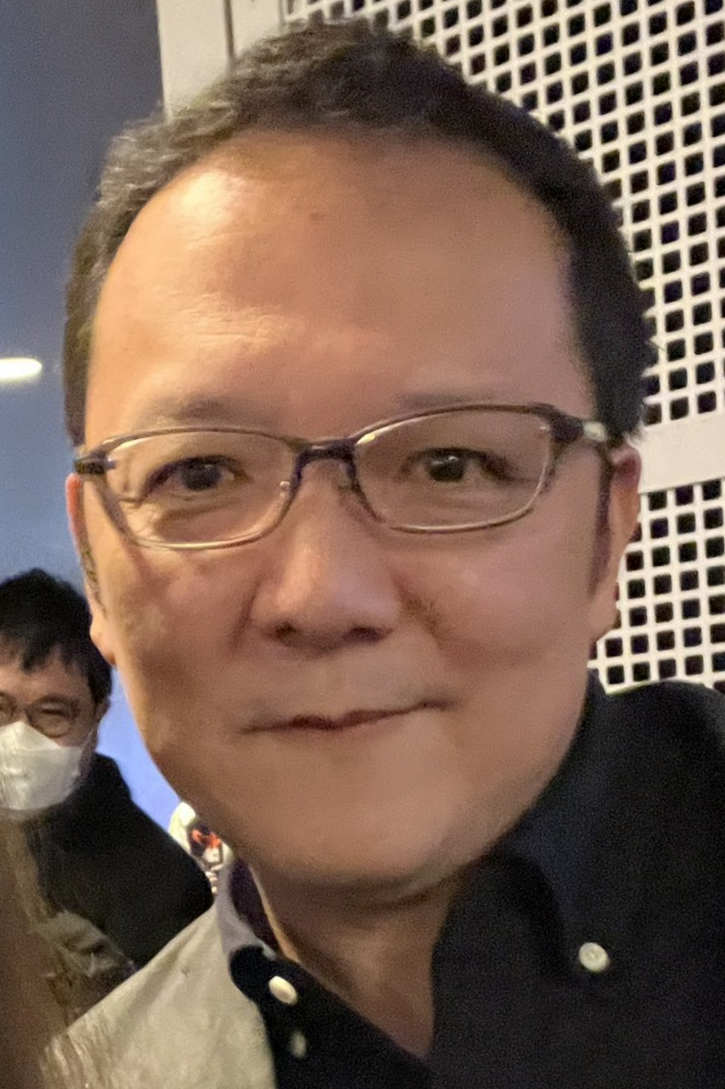
Series creator Hidetaka Miyazaki returned as lead director for Dark Souls III.

Development of Dark Souls III began in mid-2013, before the release of Dark Souls II, which was directed by Tomohiro Shibuya and Yui Tanimura rather than series creator Hidetaka Miyazaki. Miyazaki said he was not involved at the start of the project and joined during prototyping, when he began leading development. The game was developed in parallel with Bloodborne, although the two projects used mostly separate staff; Miyazaki and a small number of visual designers worked on both. Isamu Okano and Tanimura served as supporting directors. Miyazaki later described the game as both a "turning point" and a "big closure" for the series, saying FromSoftware wanted to make new projects rather than continue developing Souls games indefinitely.

Miyazaki said his work on Bloodborne influenced Dark Souls III, particularly its approach to resource management, but also made him want to return to the broader character builds and dark-fantasy elements of Dark Souls. He described his approach as "total direction", saying he sought to oversee level design, music, sound effects, and other elements of production. The game retained the series' indirect storytelling: Miyazaki said he did not want to impose a single official interpretation, encouraging players to understand the plot and world through dialogue with non-player characters, environmental details, and item flavour text. Its visual design emphasised sadness, loneliness, decay, and the beauty of a dying world. The original score was scored by Yuka Kitamura, with additional music by Motoi Sakuraba and individual boss themes by Tsukasa Saitoh and Nobuyoshi Suzuki.

Gameplay footage was shown at Gamescom 2015. Bandai Namco held a PlayStation 4 network stress test in October 2015 to test the game's online functionality before release. Dark Souls III was released in Japan for PlayStation 4 and Xbox One on March 24, 2016, and worldwide for PlayStation 4, Xbox One, and Windows on April 12, 2016. FromSoftware announced that two downloadable content packs were planned for the game. The first, Ashes of Ariandel, was released in October 2016; the second and final pack, The Ringed City, was released in March 2017. A compilation containing the base game and both expansions, Dark Souls III: The Fire Fades Edition, was released on April 21, 2017.

== Reception ==
Reception

Aggregate scores
Aggregator	Score
Metacritic	PC: 89/100; PS4: 89/100; XONE: 87/100
OpenCritic	94% recommend (Note: Based on 167 reviews)

Review scores
Publication	Score
Destructoid	8.5/10
Edge	9/10
Famitsu	38/40
Game Informer	9.25/10
GameRevolution	4.5/5
GameSpot	8/10
GamesRadar+	4.5/5
IGN	9.5/10
PC Gamer (UK)	94/100
Polygon	7/10
The Telegraph	5/5
The Guardian	5/5
VideoGamer.com	8/10

Edit on Wikidata

Dark Souls III received generally favourable reviews from critics, according to Metacritic, while OpenCritic reported that 94% of critics recommended the game. Critics praised its atmosphere, visual design, combat, and boss encounters, with many regarding it as a fitting conclusion to the Dark Souls series. Reviewers also noted its faster pace in comparison with earlier Dark Souls games, often linking this change to FromSoftware's work on Bloodborne. Other critics described parts of the game as familiar or less exploratory than previous titles, while still praising its combat and overall design.

More critical reviews focused on technical issues, a perceived lack of surprise, and a more linear world structure than some earlier entries.

Reception to Ashes of Ariandel, the game's first downloadable content expansion, was more muted than that of the base game. Critics praised its new enemies, bosses, and dedicated player versus player arena, but criticised its short length. OpenCritic rated the expansion "Fair", with 37% of critics recommending it.

=== Sales ===
In Japan, the PlayStation 4 version of Dark Souls III sold 210,141 copies during its first week of release. In April 2016, Bandai Namco Entertainment America announced that it was the company's fastest-selling title in the region and its most successful day-one launch. It was also the best-selling game in the United States in April 2016.

By May 2016, the game had shipped three million copies worldwide: 500,000 in Japan and Asia, 1.5 million in North America, and one million in Europe. By May 2020, Dark Souls III had surpassed 10 million units in sales worldwide; this figure included the base game, Dark Souls III: The Fire Fades Edition, downloadable versions, and Steam downloads.

=== Awards ===
Year	Award event	Category	Result	Ref.
2016	Golden Joystick Awards 2016	Ultimate Game of the Year	Won	
2016	Golden Joystick Awards 2016	Best Gaming Moment	Nominated	
2016	Golden Joystick Awards 2016	Best Multiplayer Game	Nominated	
2016	Golden Joystick Awards 2016	Best Visual Design	Nominated	
2016	Japan Game Awards 2016	Award for Excellence	Won	
2016	The Game Awards 2016	Best Role Playing Game	Nominated	
2016	Canadian Videogame Awards 2016	Fans' Choice: Best International Game	Nominated	
2017	20th Annual D.I.C.E. Awards	Role-Playing/Massively Multiplayer Game of the Year	Won	
2017	21st Satellite Awards	Outstanding Action/Adventure Game	Won	
