= Dark Souls II =

2014 video game

- Developer: FromSoftware
- Publisher: Bandai Namco Games: JP: FromSoftware
- Directors: Tomohiro Shibuya; Yui Tanimura
- Producer: Masanori Takeuchi
- Designer: Naotoshi Zin
- Programmer: Yoshitaka Suzuki
- Artist: Keiichiro Ogawa
- Writer: Toshifumi Nabeshima
- Composers: Motoi Sakuraba; Yuka Kitamura
- Series: Dark Souls
- Platforms: PlayStation 3; Xbox 360; Windows; PlayStation 4; Xbox One
- Release: March 11, 2014: PlayStation 3, Xbox 360; NA: March 11, 2014; JP: March 13, 2014; PAL: March 14, 2014 Windows; WW: April 24, 2014 Scholar of the First Sin; JP: February 5, 2015 (PS3, X360, PC); EU: April 2, 2015; NA: April 7, 2015; JP: April 9, 2015 (PS4, Xbox One)
- Genre: Action role-playing
- Modes: Single-player, multiplayer

Dark Souls II (Note: Japanese: ダークソウルII, Hepburn: Dāku Sōru Tsū) is a 2014 action role-playing game developed by FromSoftware and published by Bandai Namco Games. The second installment of the Dark Souls series, it is set in the kingdom of Drangleic and follows an undead traveler searching for a cure to their affliction. Despite the new setting, the presentation and gameplay, along with certain lore connections, remain similar to Dark Souls, with notable differences including further penalty for repeated deaths via a "hollowing" mechanic.

After initial delays, Dark Souls II was released worldwide on PlayStation 3 and Xbox 360 in March 2014, with a Windows version released the following month. It was a commercial success and received critical acclaim, with reviewers praising its story, atmosphere, world design and visuals, although they were divided on its difficulty and deemed its boss battles and combat mechanics inferior to the original's. It is the only game in the trilogy to not be directed by series creator Hidetaka Miyazaki.

A trilogy of DLCs was released over the rest of 2014. An enhanced version featuring the content of the DLCs along with various other upgrades and additions, Dark Souls II: Scholar of the First Sin, was released in 2015 on the original platforms as well as PlayStation 4 and Xbox One. The game would be followed by Dark Souls III in 2016.

== Gameplay ==
Dark Souls II is an entry in the Dark Souls series, known for its difficulty, as both bosses and standard enemies have the potential to defeat the player in only a few hits. As with its predecessor, opportunities for recovering health are limited. With each death, the player's maximum health is reduced. This process, called hollowing, can continue until the HP bar reaches a set lower limit of 50%. The player's full HP bar is only recovered when they expend a rare consumable item. The game uses a form of joint currency called "souls", which are used as both experience points for leveling up and also as currency for purchasing items from shops. Upon death, the player's entire collection of souls is dropped; the player can recover their dropped souls by returning to the spot where they died, but if they die again before picking them up, the souls are permanently lost.

Character abilities are based on their level in each attribute: vigor, endurance, vitality, attunement, adaptability, strength, dexterity, intelligence, and faith. When spending souls to level up, one attribute can be raised by one point per level. Increasing attributes will increase passive offensive and defensive capabilities in kind, and at certain thresholds may allow for the use of new equipment, or to impress certain non-player characters in the world and make them allies.

Multiplayer in Dark Souls II uses a similar format as its predecessors; players have the choice between co-operative play in the form of being "summoned" into another player's game world either by soapstone or in-game covenant, or player-versus-player through "invading" other worlds or arena duels. Unlike other installments in the series, Dark Souls II uses the "Soul Memory" system for matchmaking, pairing together co-operators and adversaries based on their total number of souls gained throughout the course of their respective adventures.

Dark Souls II features a more robust new game plus mode than Dark Souls. With each replay, the player retains their levels, souls, and most items. Enemy health and damage will be increased proportional to the number of times new game plus has been initiated. In addition, new enemy encounters are added, boss encounters change, merchant inventories are expanded, the chance of finding items from fallen enemies increases, and new exclusive rewards are available, among other effects.

== Synopsis ==
Like its predecessor, Dark Souls II employs minimalist storytelling to convey its plot and lore. Historical events in the world and their significance are often implicit or left to player interpretation rather than fully shown or explained. Most of the story is given to the player through dialogue from non-player characters, flavor text from items, and world design; how players progress through the story can vary heavily depending on their actions.

=== Plot ===
The story of Dark Souls II begins with a human who is cursed to become a Hollow, a zombie-like being, after dying. To break this curse, the undead travels to the fallen kingdom of Drangleic and is tasked by a mysterious figure known as the Emerald Herald with obtaining four Great Souls from other powerful undead. Once obtained, the Emerald Herald directs the undead to "Seek the King" in the capital. After fighting through the remains of the royal guards, the player encounters the Queen Nashandra, who says that King Vendrick failed in his duty and fled his kingdom long ago. She asks the protagonist to slay the king.

Near the end of the Queen's quest, the player learns that the ruin of the kingdom was in fact caused by Nashandra. She came to the king and deceived him into launching an ill-fated invasion across the sea into the lands of the giants. She coveted their souls and sought to steal their power. Though the raid succeeded in stealing the giants' unspecified power, the giants retaliated. Invading Drangleic, they eventually destroyed the kingdom. With his kingdom in ruins, the king discovered Nashandra's true purpose and locked himself inside the Undead Crypt, to protect the kingdom's power and secrets from her, using different methods to ensure the Throne of Want, her desired object and linked to the source of his kingdom's power, lay beyond her grasp.

The player meets the Emerald Herald one final time, who states that Nashandra is a fragment of Manus, who was the final boss in the Artorias of the Abyss expansion in Dark Souls. She then asks the protagonist to put Nashandra to rest and to link the fire. The protagonist kills Nashandra and then sits on the Throne of Want, with the decision of either linking the fire or letting it die out ultimately being left ambiguous.

In Scholar of the First Sin, the base story changes slightly, notably with the addition of Aldia, King Vendrick's brother, to the final area, provided the optional boss, a hollow King Vendrick, has been defeated. Aldia appears several times throughout the game, offering the player cryptic hints about the cyclical nature of the world. Aldia, with the memory of King Vendrick, attempts to help the protagonist understand that there might be another way, a way out of the cycle of light and dark. The player is given two options: claim the Throne of Want, as in the first game; or the player can abscond the throne, and follow their own path beyond light or dark, seemingly with Aldia now accompanying the protagonist.

=== Expansions ===
The three The Lost Crowns DLCs add side-stories each featuring three other daughters of Manus and a quest to obtain the crown of three other kings whose rule has long ended. Once completed, the player can return to the place where Vendrick hid his power from Nashandra and obtain a fourth crown that combines the other three and cures the player of undeath.

== Development ==
Dark Souls II was announced at the Spike Video Game Awards on December 7, 2012. Hidetaka Miyazaki, who served as the director on Dark Souls, acted as a supervisor, while the game was directed by Tomohiro Shibuya and Yui Tanimura.

Dark Souls II features gameplay mechanics similar to its predecessor; Shibuya stated that he had no intention of changing the controls. The game features a whole new world, with many weapons that are used to fight the monsters in the game. Covenants, a feature in the original Dark Souls, that allowed the player to align with different factions, make a reappearance, though it is easier to understand and more accessible. The game world is roughly the same size as in Dark Souls, though content density is much richer, and gives players more freedom in how to progress, with the beginning of the game more accessible to newcomers. The game retains the challenging gameplay characteristic of the original, as Tanimura explained: "We do not plan on having an Easy Mode since we are creating this game with a thought that challenge and difficulty are core elements of the game."

The development team utilized a more powerful graphics engine for the sequel. New challenges, adding to the series' documented difficulty level, were also added. The game features a more advanced AI system, that allows enemies to react to a wider range of actions by the player. In September 2013, an announcement regarding the delay of the PC version was made by Tanimura who said it was necessary to ensure it was optimal.

=== Additional content ===
Bandai Namco Games producer Takeshi Miyazoe originally stated in December 2013 that he did not expect there to be downloadable content (DLC) for Dark Souls II. Despite that, in an interview in January 2014, he said that there is definitely potential for DLC for the game and that fan feedback is key. On June 4, 2014, FromSoftware announced a trilogy of DLC collectively known as The Lost Crowns. The first of these, titled Crown of the Sunken King, was released on July 22, 2014. The second, Crown of the Old Iron King, was released on August 26, 2014. The final DLC, Crown of the Ivory King, was slated to be released on September 24, 2014, but was delayed until September 30, 2014.

=== Scholar of the First Sin ===
On November 25, 2014, Bandai Namco Games announced an updated version of the game, Dark Souls II: Scholar of the First Sin, which was released on April 1, 2015, for PC, PlayStation 3, and Xbox 360, along with PlayStation 4 and Xbox One. On all platforms, the game is a compilation of Dark Souls II and its three DLC campaigns. On PC, PlayStation 4 and Xbox One, Scholar of the First Sin also features remastered visuals with more advanced lighting effects, running at 1080p resolution at 60 frames per second. The remastered version also makes changes to the game itself; enemy positions and behaviors have been revised, and the game also supports up to six players in multiplayer scenarios. Its release coincided with patch version 1.10, which was also released for existing versions of the game on February 5, 2015. The update included improvements to online play, the addition of the titular Scholar of the First Sin NPC, performance improvements, and adjustments to items and covenants among other changes. Despite these improvements, the update did not fix the long-standing frame rate-dependent weapon degradation bug, which was later fixed in a patch released in April 2015.

The existing PC version of Dark Souls II received the 1.10 patch at no charge; the remastered Scholar of the First Sin edition must be purchased separately, but is available at a discount to existing Dark Souls II owners. The remastered version uses DirectX 11 instead of 9, and save data from the original version is incompatible with it.

== Reception ==
Reception

Aggregate scores
Aggregator	Score
Metacritic	PC: 91/100; PS3: 91/100; X360: 91/100
OpenCritic	89% recommend (Note: Based on 45 reviews)

Review scores
Publication	Score
Computer and Video Games	10/10
Edge	9/10
Eurogamer	9/10 (Italy); 9/10 (Portugal); 10/10 (Spain); 9/10 (UK)
Famitsu	37/40
Game Informer	9.75/10
GameRevolution	4.5/5
GamesMaster	96%
GameSpot	9/10
GamesTM	9/10
IGN	9/10
Joystiq	4/5
PlayStation Official Magazine – Australia	9/10
PlayStation Official Magazine – UK	9/10
Play	90%
Polygon	9/10
VideoGamer.com	10/10

Awards
Publication	Award
Golden Joystick Award, 4Players, Empire, Eurogamer, Sky Magazine	Game of the Year
GameTrailers	Best Role-Playing Game
Golden Joystick Award	Best Gaming Moment (Nomination)

Edit on Wikidata

Dark Souls II received universal acclaim, according to review aggregator platform Metacritic. Critics praised the game's story, atmosphere, visuals, and environmental design, though some were critical of the boss quality, combat mechanics, and increased difficulty, adding that, in these regards, it fared poorly in comparison to the previous games (Dark Souls and its spiritual predecessor, Demon's Souls). Famitsu reviewed the game with four reviewers giving their opinions, who gave it 9/10/9/9, bringing the total score to 37/40. IGN's critic Marty Sliva gave the game a score of 9/10: "Dark Souls II is a smart, massive, and incredibly rewarding sequel. It's crammed with deep systems, tense encounters, and enough clever multiplayer and New Game Plus elements to make me want to restart the second I saw the end credits. Not all of the tweaks and additions worked out for the best, the penalty for dying made the game almost unplayable but with such great enemies and levels to fight and explore, Dark Souls II made 60 hours of pain and agony so much fun they flew by in a heartbeat." Daniel Tack of Game Informer gave the game a 9.75 out of 10, stating: "Dark Souls II is an epic adventure from start to finish packed with wondrous environments, imaginative and terrifying foes, and the continual adrenaline-apprehension rush of passing through each fog gate makes this title a must-play." Polygon's Phil Kollar also gave it a 9/10, and similarly praised the ambition displayed by the team in creating such a vast RPG universe for the player to explore, the notorious difficulty, and the sense of triumph that comes with eventually defeating the game; he notes that his character died 235 times before completing it.

Dark Souls II won the "Game of the Year" award at the 2014 Golden Joystick Awards. At The Game Awards 2014, Dark Souls II received nominations for "Game of the Year", "Best Role Playing Game", and "Best Online Experience". However, Dark Souls II is considered by some to be the black sheep of the Dark Souls franchise.

=== Sales ===
A few weeks after release, the game had shipped over a million copies within the United States and Europe. A year after release, the game had sold over 2.5 million copies worldwide.
