= Lost Kingdoms =

2002 video game

- European cover art
- Developer: FromSoftware
- Publisher: Activision: JP: FromSoftware
- Producer: Atsushi Taniguchi
- Designer: Takashi Kojō
- Programmer: Masaaki Sakamoto
- Artists: Norimasa Kawano; Makoto Sato
- Composer: Kota Hoshino
- Platform: GameCube
- Release: JP: April 25, 2002; NA: May 29, 2002; EU: August 9, 2002
- Genre: Action role-playing
- Modes: Single-player, multiplayer

Lost Kingdoms (Note: known as Rune (ルーン, Rūn) in Japan) is a 2002 action role-playing game developed by FromSoftware and published by Activision. The game was released in Japan in April, in North America in May, and in Europe in August. Lost Kingdoms is a card-based action role-playing game where battles are fought in real-time. A sequel, Lost Kingdoms II, was released in 2003.

== Story ==
The story begins with a substance known in the game as black fog. This fog is known for consuming people, towns, and other signs of civilization or life, nothing ever to escape from within. In Lost Kingdoms, the fog invades the land of Argwyll, home of the main character Katia, who is also the princess of this kingdom. The fog has been terrorizing the land for a long time, and Katia's father - the king - eventually ventured out to help try and deal with the deadly substance. However, since her father hadn't returned in some time, Katia soon leaves to find him.

Before she leaves, however, she is granted access to the castle's runestone, a key item in this game. With the runestone, Katia is able to use special magic cards to battle for her against the monsters that have spawned inside the black fog. Using this runestone, Katia is granted to leave the castle in the hopes of saving the kingdom, as well as finding and possibly rescuing her father. Unfortunately for her, she later finds that monsters killed her father. Later Katia finds a new enemy in the form of another runestone wielder, a girl named Helena that she repeatedly runs into. Eventually, Katia fights and kills Helena, but before she dies Helena reveals to Katia that she was trying to save her own land from the black fog. Katia eventually discovers that a man named Thalnos is behind the black fog, as well as the existence of a malevolent entity known as the God of Destruction. After fighting and killing Thalnos, it turns out that he was just a vessel for the God of Destruction. Katia then fights and defeats the evil god as the final boss of the game.

== Gameplay ==
Lost Kingdoms is best known for its unique system of combat. Battles are played in real-time, where the player has to keep their character moving to avoid enemy attacks and plot tactical points to attack. Katia uses her cards for battle purposes only, as she cannot fight. Lost Kingdoms also has a multiplayer system in which two players can use their own decks to battle one another. When compared to single-player, the multiplayer has various restrictions to make the fight fair. Healing and one-hit kills are forbidden. Since some cards have the ability to return used cards back to the deck, these types of cards are also prohibited.

=== Cards ===
There are three special types of cards. Along with the battle types are elements. The elements of these cards includes fire, water, wood, earth, and neutral. Each type has its own advantage over another: Fire is strong against wood, but weak against water. Water is strong against fire, but weak against earth. Wood is strong against earth, but weak against fire. Earth is strong against water, but weak against wood. Neutral is a special and rare element, as it has no strengths and weaknesses against the other elements. Aside from finding new cards, Katia can also buy, sell, transform, and capture new cards.

Katia is capable of purchasing, finding, or getting her foes to submit to becoming new cards. Katia can also sell unwanted cards, and have her old cards transformed into new and/or stronger cards. Only a couple of cards are available after each level is completed, and they are not always completely new. Transforming cards is a part of the games experience point aspect, since defeating enemies with a card will earn the card experience points. Once cards earn enough experience, the shop will transform them into a different card for a certain number of experience points. Capturing cards is a special process that allows Katia to transform her foes into cards. By initiating a capture throw, Katia can force weakened enemies into submission and transform them. If a capture throw fails, then the enemy only lose a small part of their life.

== Reception ==
Reception

Aggregate score
Aggregator	Score
Metacritic	72/100

Review scores
Publication	Score
Edge	8/10
Electronic Gaming Monthly	8/10
Eurogamer	6/10
Famitsu	33/40
Game Informer	8/10
GamePro	4.5/5
GameRevolution	C
GameSpot	7.1/10
GameSpy	4/5
GameZone	6.8/10
IGN	5.9/10
Nintendo Power	3.9/5
RPGamer	5/10
RPGFan	82%

Lost Kingdoms received "average" reviews according to the review aggregation website Metacritic. Fran Mirabella III of IGN cited the game's smooth framerate, deck customization, and two player mode as pros, but cited repetitive music, stiff graphics, average gameplay, trial-and-error, and random battles as cons. Mike Bracken of RPGFan was more positive, calling it a solid game marred by lack of polish and short length. In his review he praised the gameplay as addictive and a highly polished and impressive mix of its influences, but tempered his review by noting the simplistic story, graphics, sound, and translation. However, Chris Holoka of AllGame gave the game three stars out of five, calling it "A well-conceived concept suffering from a somewhat lackluster execution." In Japan, Famitsu gave it a score of 33 out of 40.
