= Lost Kingdoms II =

2003 video game

- PAL region cover art
- Developer: FromSoftware
- Publisher: Activision: JP: FromSoftware
- Producer: Atsushi Taniguchi
- Designer: Takashi Kojō
- Programmer: Masaaki Sakamoto
- Artists: Ikuko Matsui; Makoto Sato
- Composer: Kota Hoshino
- Platform: GameCube
- Release: NA: May 22, 2003; JP: May 23, 2003; EU: June 6, 2003
- Genre: Action role-playing
- Modes: Single-player, multiplayer

Lost Kingdoms II, known as Rune II: Koruten no Kagi no Himitsu in Japan, is a 2003 action role-playing game developed by FromSoftware and published by Activision. It is the sequel to Lost Kingdoms. Lost Kingdoms II is a card-based action role-playing game where battles are fought in real-time.

== Plot ==
Generations after the events of Lost Kingdoms, Katia of Argwyll is now remembered as a legendary queen. The heroine of this story is Tara Grimface, a reserved member of a guild of thieves, who is trying to find her way in a dangerous world. While she is an outcast even among her allies, they respect and fear her because she possesses a True Runestone that allows Tara to use powerful magic cards in battle. Tara becomes embroiled in events that will eventually shape the lands around her as she travels with the Band of the Scorpion on a mission to steal the runestones crafted in the caverns of Kendaria. It is here that Tara first happens across the monster responsible for creating these runestones to which she later finds to be the body of the god of harmony. Through the journey Tara undertakes she will eventually find herself on a path to discovering her former self. Although, if she is to uncover the secret of her mysterious origins, she will have to overcome her distrust of others.

== Gameplay ==
In Lost Kingdoms II the player engages enemies during exploration and may revisit levels after they have been completed. There are a number of new cards, though most of the original cards from the first game are retained. Many of the originals have their effects reworked in various ways. Notable changes in the card effects include giving each summon card two effects that the player may choose from, and a new type of card that transforms the player into a creature.

A notable interface addition is the ability to pay double the cost for any card in exchange for enhanced effect. Certain card combinations can be combined into a single, generally highly potent effect.

A new element is also introduced along with the original elements of fire, water, wood, earth and neutral. The new element, mechanical, is much like neutral as it has no weakness and strengths versus other elements. The only difference between the two is that mechanical and neutral have separate power levels, which the player can increase by using cards of the same element repeatedly, but lowering all other elements slightly and the opposite element even further. The main villain of the game is a user of the mechanical element.

== Reception ==
Reception

Aggregate score
Aggregator	Score
Metacritic	68/100

Review scores
Publication	Score
Edge	4/10
Electronic Gaming Monthly	6/10
Eurogamer	6/10
Famitsu	30/40
Game Informer	8.5/10
GamePro	4/5
GameRevolution	B−
GameSpot	7.6/10
GameSpy	2/5
GameZone	6/10
IGN	6.2/10
Nintendo Power	4.3/5
RPGFan	83%

The game received a bit more mixed reviews than the original according to the review aggregation website Metacritic. In Japan, Famitsu gave it a score of two eights and two sevens for a total of 30 out of 40.

GameSpot named it the best GameCube game of May 2003.
