= Otogi: Myth of Demons =

2002 video game

- Developer: FromSoftware
- Publishers: JP: FromSoftware; NA/EU: Sega
- Director: Rintaro Yamada
- Producer: Masanori Takeuchi
- Designers: Kunihiro Sadamoto; Kazuhiro Hamatani
- Programmer: Takeshi Suzuki
- Artist: Daisuke Satake
- Platform: Xbox
- Release: JP: December 12, 2002; NA: August 26, 2003; EU: September 5, 2003
- Genres: Action role-playing, hack and slash
- Mode: Single-player

Otogi: Myth of Demons is a 2002 action role-playing game developed by FromSoftware and published by Sega. It was released for the Xbox in Japan in December 2002, and in 2003 by Sega in North America in August, and Europe in September. Otogi follows former executioner Raikoh Minamoto as he attempts to purge the demons that have overrun Japan and restore the Great Seal that kept them at bay. It received positive reviews and was followed by a sequel, Otogi 2: Immortal Warriors, in 2003.

== Plot ==
The game's protagonist Raikoh Minamoto (based on Minamoto no Yorimitsu) was born into a clan of executioners under the emperor's command. Raikoh was given the order to kill his own father. He couldn't bring himself to do it, so he stole Soul Shrine, his clan's ancestral sword, and fled the capital city of Kyoto. Upon his departure, the Great Seal separating the demon and human worlds was broken. Kyoto was all but leveled and a wave of demons appeared. Raikoh was almost killed by the flood of darkness, but a Princess, who was banished to the netherworld, saved him and held him in a state between life and death. The Princess gave him a new body in exchange for his services. She would allow him to repent for his sins as an assassin by saving the world from the demons unleashed upon it. Raikoh begins his quest to restore the Great Seal and stop the one responsible for its collapse.

After purging some Yasha Ravens from the outskirts of the former Imperial Capital, Raikoh is tasked by the Princess with restoring the four Essences; elemental ki that will help restore the Great Seal. Raikoh travels the landscape and restores the Essence of Gold, the Essence of Water, the Essence of Wood, and the Essence of Fire. At the Princess's behest, he then begins the ritual to complete the Great Seal, but is banished to the underworld by a mysterious figure.

In the underworld, Raikoh travels through mirror versions of the areas he has already traversed, and collects eight Soul Cords needed to ascend back to the land of the living. He then travels up the immensely tall Spirit Tower in order to return, but is chased by a large Orochi hydra. Upon his return to the living world, Raikoh travels to the citadel of Lord Michizane, now identified as the man who broke the Great Seal by the Princess, and the man who banished Raikoh to the Underworld. Raikoh frees the captured Essences from Michizane before dueling him above the clouds. Michizane is defeated, and Raikoh plays a flute at his gravestone.

On a second playthrough, it is revealed at the end of the game that the Princess knew Michizane intimately before the Great Seal was broken. She also appears either to vanish to parts unknown or to die herself; the nature of her departure is ambiguous.

== Gameplay ==
Otogi is a single-player action-adventure game played from a third-person view. While Raikoh is a fixed character, his health can be upgraded across the course of the game, and his stats altered by equipping various weapons, magic, or accessories. Weapons are divided into four categories: swords, heavy weapons, twin swords, and staves. Similarly, there are four schools of magic loosely based on the Four Symbols: Dragon (wind), Phoenix (fire), Butterfly (Water), and Chimera (Lightning).

Health in Otogi is represented by a series of Health Orbs. Within the top most Orb, health lost will regenerate, but if all of the health in an Orb is lost, it shatters and no longer regenerates. Orbs can be restored by finding items in the landscape, and health can be regained within an orb by slaying an enemy.

Magic Points in Otogi are an extremely important resource. While they are used to cast spells, they are also used to keep Raikoh's undead body alive, and so slowly deplete over time. When all Magic Points are depleted, Raikoh can no longer regenerate health, and slowly loses health until he either dies or finds more Magic Points (either from an item or by defeating an enemy).

Most pieces of the environment in Otogi can be destroyed by Raikoh's heavy weapon attacks, or by strong enemies. This was relatively rare for the period, being seen in few titles, such as Red Faction.

== Reception ==
Reception

Aggregate score
Aggregator	Score
Metacritic	80/100

Review scores
Publication	Score
Electronic Gaming Monthly	9/10, 7/10, 9/10
Eurogamer	6/10
Famitsu	31/40
Game Informer	6.75/10
GamePro	3.5/5
GameRevolution	B
GameSpot	8.4/10
GameSpy	4/5
GameZone	9.4/10
IGN	8.3/10
Official Xbox Magazine (US)	9/10
Famitsu Xbox	8/10, 8/10, 9/10, 7/10

The game received "favorable" reviews according to video game review aggregator Metacritic.

The editors of GameSpot named Otogi the best Xbox game of August 2003, and nominated the game for their 2003 "Best Game No One Played" award, which ultimately went to Amplitude.

Retrospectively, Mike Zeller of USgamer stated that FromSoftware's Dark Souls series "owes a debt" to Otogi and that much of the Souls series DNA comes from Otogi, including a number of similar gameplay and story elements that FromSoftware had previously used in Otogi before the Souls series.

== Other media ==
Famitsu released 5 promotional prize Otogi X Britney DVDs, all containing a demo of Otogi, two trailers for the game, two Britney Spears music videos, and audio tracks. The two trailers for Otogi were accompanied by Britney Spears' 2002 single "Overprotected".
