= FromSoftware =

Japanese video game developer

FromSoftware, Inc.
- Native name: 株式会社フロム・ソフトウェア
- Romanized name: Kabushiki gaisha furomu sofutowea
- Type: Subsidiary (kabushiki gaisha)
- Industry: Video games
- Founded: November 1, 1986; 40 years ago
- Founder: Naotoshi Zin
- Headquarters: Tokyo, Japan
- Key people: Hidetaka Miyazaki; (representative director and president)
- Products: King's Field; Armored Core; Demon's Souls; Dark Souls; Bloodborne; Sekiro: Shadows Die Twice; Elden Ring
- Revenue: ¥ 23.50 billion (2024)
- Operating income: ¥ 10.08 billion (2024)
- Net income: ¥ 6.62 billion (2024)
- Total assets: ¥ 76.84 billion (2024)
- Owner: Kadokawa Corporation (70%); Sixjoy Hong Kong (16%); Sony Interactive Entertainment (14%)
- Number of employees: 472 (September 2026)
- Website: FromSoftware

FromSoftware, Inc. is a Japanese video game developer and publisher. Founded by Naotoshi Zin on November 1, 1986 as a business software developer, the company released their first video game, King's Field, for the PlayStation in 1994. Its success shifted FromSoftware to focus fully on games, with them producing two more King's Field games before the first release of the mecha shooter series Armored Core in 1997.

By the 2000s, FromSoftware's releases included the Echo Night, Shadow Tower, Lost Kingdoms, Otogi, and Another Century's Episode series. The company achieved breakout success by the 2010s with Demon's Souls and the Dark Souls trilogy of action role-playing games. Often cited among the greatest video games ever made, their emphasis on high difficulty and environmental storytelling led to the creation of the Soulslike subgenre, which also includes other later FromSoftware titles such as Bloodborne (2015), Sekiro: Shadows Die Twice (2019), and Elden Ring (2022).

Hidetaka Miyazaki, creator and director of the Dark Souls series, as well as other successful FromSoftware titles like Demon's Souls, Bloodborne, Sekiro: Shadows Die Twice and Elden Ring, has served as FromSoftware's representative director and president since 2014, with Zin remaining as an advisor. Miyazaki directs and designs the majority of the company's games in addition to his executive duties. FromSoftware is primarily owned by Kadokawa Corporation (70%), with minority stakes by Sixjoy Hong Kong (16%), a subsidiary of Tencent, and Sony Interactive Entertainment (14%). FromSoftware usually self-publishes in Japan, and has partnered with international publishers, including Agetec, Sony, Bandai Namco Entertainment, Sega, Capcom, and Koch Media.

== History ==
=== 1980s and 1990s ===
Founded in Tokyo on November 1, 1986, by Naotoshi Zin, FromSoftware originally began as a developer of business applications before shifting focus to video games. The company released its first game, King's Field, for the PlayStation in 1994. Despite its commercial success in Japan, the game was not released in other regions, although 1995's King's Field II was released in both North America and Europe in 1996. After releasing King's Field III in 1996, FromSoftware went on to release the horror game Echo Night and the 1998 role-playing game Shadow Tower. In 1997, FromSoftware released Armored Core, the first release in its flagship Armored Core series of mecha combat games.

=== 2000s ===
With the launch of the PlayStation 2 in 2000, FromSoftware released the role-playing games Eternal Ring and Evergrace. The same year, FromSoftware released Sword of Moonlight: King's Field Making Tool, an SDK for Windows that lets users develop their own King's Field games. In 2003, FromSoftware published Tenchu: Wrath of Heaven, a stealth game that combines action and adventure elements. In 2004, FromSoftware bought the rights to the series, excluding the first two games, from Activision. The company also released King's Field IV and Shadow Tower Abyss, in addition to the Lost Kingdoms series for the GameCube. The company also made a few games exclusive to the Xbox around this time, such as Murakumo: Renegade Mech Pursuit, Otogi: Myth of Demons, Otogi 2: Immortal Warriors, Metal Wolf Chaos, and Chromehounds. In 2005, FromSoftware would start to produce a series of licensed games based on the various anime properties under the banner Another Century's Episode. The same year, the company hosted the video game industry's first internship that let students experience game development through a game creation kit, Adventure Player, for the PlayStation Portable. In May 2008, FromSoftware underwent a stock split.

=== 2010s ===
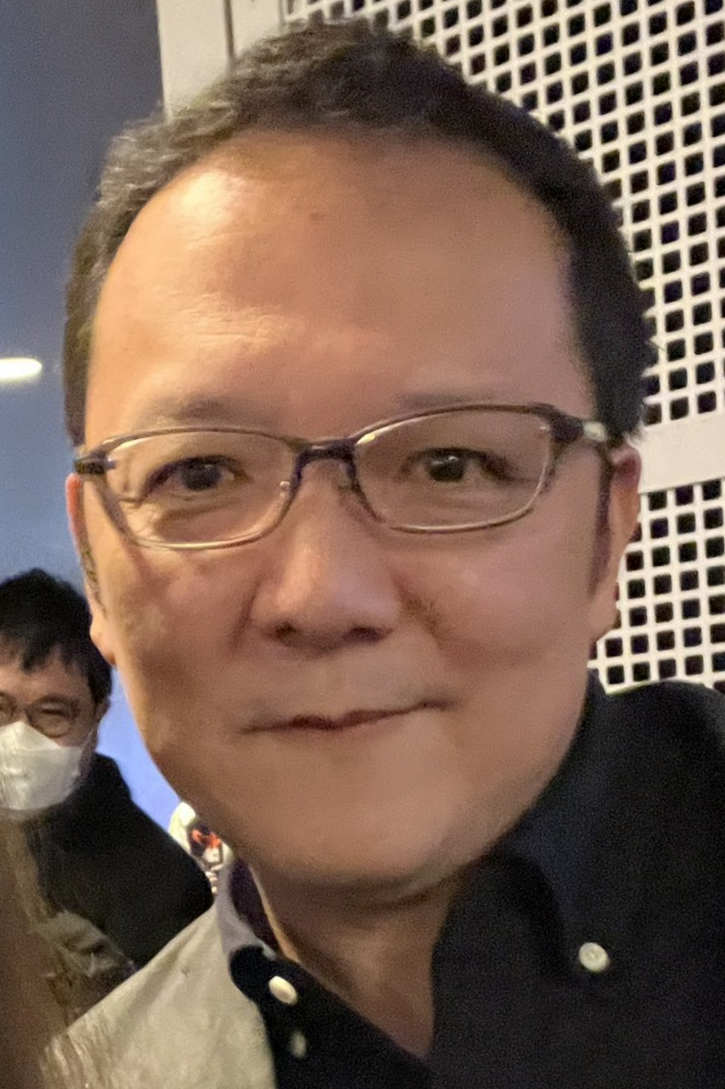
Hidetaka Miyazaki directed Demon's Souls and most of FromSoftware's subsequent Soulsborne games. In 2014, he became company president.

FromSoftware achieved breakout success in the 2010s, spurred by the release of Demon's Souls (2009) and Dark Souls (2011), the latter being the first entry in a trilogy whose success led to the creation of a subgenre of action role-playing games known as Soulsborne games. These include Dark Souls II (2014), Bloodborne (2015), Dark Souls III (2016), Sekiro: Shadows Die Twice (2019), and Elden Ring (2022), all of which have received several awards and are often listed among the greatest video games of all time. In April 2014, Kadokawa Corporation announced its intention to purchase the company from former shareholder Transcosmos. Following other restructuring, Souls creator Hidetaka Miyazaki would be promoted to company president the following month and later given the title of representative director. In January 2016, FromSoftware established a studio in Fukuoka that focuses on creating computer-generated imagery (CGI) assets for its games.

=== 2020s ===
In August 2022, Sixjoy Hong Kong (a subsidiary of Tencent) and Sony Interactive Entertainment respectively acquired 16.25% and 14.09% of FromSoftware, leaving 69.66% to Kadokawa. In November 2022, a report by GamesIndustry.biz claimed that FromSoftware was paying its employees at sub-standard rates. The company had 423 employees as of June 2024. In October 2024, the developer announced a salary increase of approximately 12% for its employees. In April 2025, FromSoftware announced The Duskbloods, a multiplayer-focused soulslike game directed by Miyazaki for the Nintendo Switch 2.

== Games ==
List of games developed by FromSoftware
Year	Title	System	International publisher
1994	King's Field	PlayStation	—N/a
1995	King's Field II	PlayStation	NA: ASCII Entertainment; EU: Sony Computer Entertainment
1996	King's Field III	PlayStation	ASCII Entertainment
1997	Armored Core	PlayStation	Sony Computer Entertainment
1997	Armored Core: Project Phantasma	PlayStation	ASCII Entertainment
1998	Shadow Tower	PlayStation	Agetec
1998	Echo Night	PlayStation	Agetec
1999	Armored Core: Master of Arena	PlayStation	Agetec
1999	Spriggan: Lunar Verse	PlayStation	—N/a
1999	Frame Gride	Dreamcast	—N/a
1999	Echo Night 2: The Lord of Nightmares	PlayStation	—N/a
2000	Eternal Ring	PlayStation 2	NA: Agetec; EU: Ubisoft
2000	Evergrace	PlayStation 2	NA: Agetec; EU: Ubisoft
2000	Armored Core 2	PlayStation 2	NA: Agetec; EU: Ubisoft
2000	The Adventures of Cookie & Cream	PlayStation 2	NA: Agetec; EU: Empire Interactive
2001	Armored Core 2: Another Age	PlayStation 2	NA: Agetec; EU: Metro3D
2001	Forever Kingdom	PlayStation 2	Agetec
2001	King's Field IV	PlayStation 2	NA: Agetec; EU: Metro3D
2002	Armored Core 3	PlayStation 2, PlayStation Portable	NA: Agetec; EU: Metro3D
2002	Lost Kingdoms	GameCube	Activision
2002	Murakumo: Renegade Mech Pursuit	Xbox	Ubisoft
2002	Otogi: Myth of Demons	Xbox	Sega
2003	Silent Line: Armored Core	PlayStation 2, PlayStation Portable	Agetec
2003	Thousand Land	Xbox	—N/a
2003	Lost Kingdoms II	GameCube	Activision
2003	Shadow Tower Abyss	PlayStation 2	—N/a
2003	Otogi 2: Immortal Warriors	Xbox	Sega
2004	Echo Night: Beyond	PlayStation 2	NA: Agetec; EU: Indie Games Productions
2004	Armored Core: Nexus	PlayStation 2	Agetec
2004	Kuon	PlayStation 2	NA: Agetec; EU: Indie Games Productions
2004	Armored Core: Nine Breaker	PlayStation 2	NA: Agetec; EU: 505 Games
2004	Armored Core: Formula Front	PlayStation Portable, PlayStation 2	NA: Agetec; EU: 505 Games
2004	Metal Wolf Chaos	Xbox	—N/a
2005	Yoshitsune Eiyūden: The Story of Hero Yoshitsune	PlayStation 2	—N/a
2005	Another Century's Episode	PlayStation 2	Banpresto
2005	Armored Core: Last Raven	PlayStation 2, PlayStation Portable	NA: Agetec; EU: 505 Games
2006	Enchanted Arms	Xbox 360, PlayStation 3	Ubisoft
2006	Another Century's Episode 2	PlayStation 2	Banpresto
2006	Chromehounds	Xbox 360	Sega
2006	King's Field: Additional I	PlayStation Portable	—N/a
2006	King's Field: Additional II	PlayStation Portable	—N/a
2006	Armored Core 4	PlayStation 3, Xbox 360	NA: Sega; EU: 505 Games
2007	Nanpure VOW	Nintendo DS	—N/a
2007	Iraroji VOW	Nintendo DS	—N/a
2007	Another Century's Episode 3: The Final	PlayStation 2	Banpresto
2008	Armored Core: For Answer	PlayStation 3, Xbox 360	Ubisoft
2008	Shadow Assault: Tenchu	Xbox 360	—N/a
2009	Inugami-ke no Ichizoku	Nintendo DS	Nintendo
2009	Ninja Blade	Xbox 360, Windows	Microsoft Game Studios
2009	Demon's Souls	PlayStation 3	JP: Sony Computer Entertainment; NA: Atlus; PAL: Namco Bandai Partners
2009	Yatsuhaka-mura	Nintendo DS	—N/a
2010	Another Century's Episode: R	PlayStation 3	Banpresto
2010	Monster Hunter Diary	PlayStation Portable	Capcom
2011	Another Century's Episode Portable	PlayStation Portable	Namco Bandai Games
2011	Dark Souls	PlayStation 3, Xbox 360, Windows	Namco Bandai Games
2012	Armored Core V	PlayStation 3, Xbox 360	Namco Bandai Games
2012	Mobile Suit Gundam Unicorn	PlayStation 3	Namco Bandai Games
2012	Steel Battalion: Heavy Armor	Xbox 360	Capcom
2013	Armored Core: Verdict Day	PlayStation 3, Xbox 360	Namco Bandai Games
2014	Dark Souls II	PlayStation 3, Xbox 360, Windows	Bandai Namco Games
2015	Dark Souls II: Scholar of the First Sin	PlayStation 3, PlayStation 4, Windows, Xbox 360, Xbox One	Bandai Namco Games
2015	Bloodborne	PlayStation 4	Sony Computer Entertainment
2016	Dark Souls III	PlayStation 4, Xbox One, Windows	Bandai Namco Entertainment
2018	Déraciné	PlayStation 4 (PlayStation VR)	Sony Interactive Entertainment
2019	Sekiro: Shadows Die Twice	PlayStation 4, Windows, Xbox One, Stadia	Activision
2022	Elden Ring	PlayStation 4, PlayStation 5, Windows, Xbox One, Xbox Series X/S, Nintendo Switch 2	Bandai Namco Entertainment
2023	Armored Core VI: Fires of Rubicon	PlayStation 4, PlayStation 5, Windows, Xbox One, Xbox Series X/S	Bandai Namco Entertainment
2025	Elden Ring Nightreign	PlayStation 4, PlayStation 5, Windows, Xbox One, Xbox Series X/S	Bandai Namco Entertainment
2027	The Duskbloods	Nintendo Switch 2	FromSoftware, Nintendo

DLCs
Year	Title	Game
2012	Artorias of the Abyss	Dark Souls
2014	Crown of the Sunken King	Dark Souls II
2014	Crown of the Old Iron King	Dark Souls II
2014	Crown of the Ivory King	Dark Souls II
2015	The Old Hunters	Bloodborne
2016	Ashes of Ariandel	Dark Souls III
2017	The Ringed City	Dark Souls III
2024	Shadow of the Erdtree	Elden Ring
2025	The Forsaken Hollows	Elden Ring Nightreign
2026	Tarnished Pack	Elden Ring
