= Pip Torrens =

British actor (born 1960)

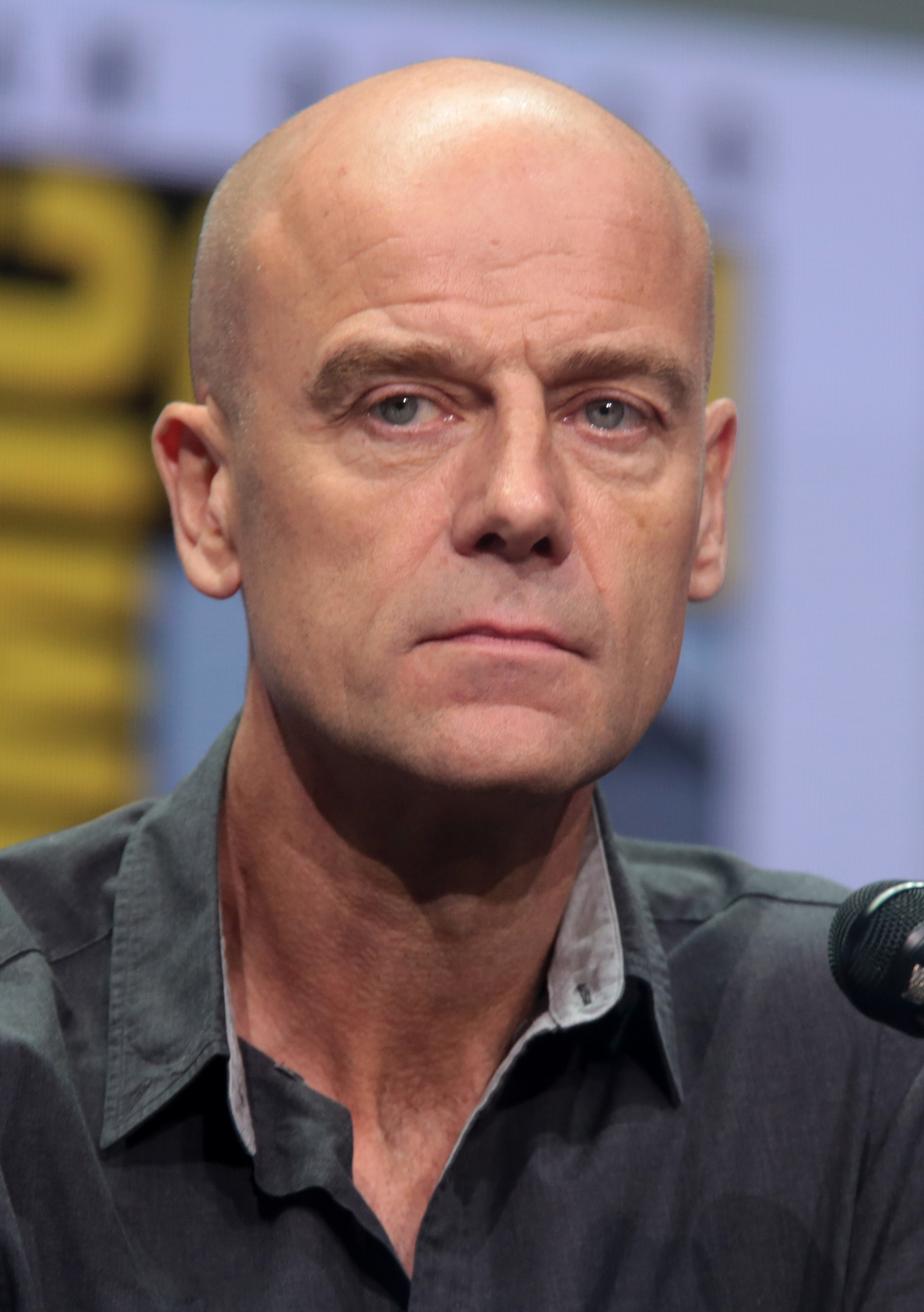
- Torrens at the 2017 San Diego Comic-Con
- Born: Philip D'Oyly Torrens; 2 June 1960 (age 66); Bromley, Kent, England
- Education: Trinity College, Cambridge; Drama Studio London
- Occupation: Actor
- Years active: 1984–present

Philip D'Oyly "Pip" Torrens (born 2 June 1960) is an English actor. Torrens portrayed courtier Tommy Lascelles in the Netflix drama The Crown, aristocrat Lord Massen in the HBO series The Nevers, Herr Klaus Starr in Preacher, and held leading roles in Poldark and Versailles. His film appearances include The Danish Girl, The Iron Lady, War Horse and Star Wars: The Force Awakens. He has played The Curator in Supermassive Games' Dark Pictures Anthology series of horror video games since 2019.

== Early life and education ==
Philip D'Oyly Torrens is the son of the Rev. Robert Harrington Torrens, MA, and descendant of the lawyer and colonial official Henry Whitelock Torrens, Torrens was born in Bromley, Kent, and educated at Bloxham School. He studied English Literature at Trinity College, Cambridge (BA 1981, MA 1987), and subsequently studied acting at Drama Studio London.

== Career ==
Torrens's television appearances include Consenting Adults, two episodes of Jeeves and Wooster, two episodes of Doctor Who ("Human Nature"/"The Family of Blood"), The Brittas Empire, Green Wing, Silk, The Government Inspector (as John Scarlett), The Last Detective and DI Spencer for a few episodes in The Bill in 2001. He has also appeared in a 2008 series of British television advertisements for First Direct, with Matthew King. He appeared alongside Michael Gambon in a 1992 episode of Maigret.

In 2011, Torrens appeared in both episodes of an Outnumbered two-part special. In 2012, he appeared in the first episode of series 8 of Hustle, as Heinz Zimmermann and also presented new gameshow The Devil's Dinner Party. Torrens briefly appeared in an episode of Death in Paradise in 2013, as a museum guide. His film appearances include Tomorrow Never Dies, as the captain of the fictional HMS Bedford, the 2001 film To End All Wars, and voicework for Valiant.

In 2013, Torrens appeared in "The Waldo Moment", an episode of the anthology series Black Mirror. In November 2014, Torrens played the part of Richard Grenville in the BBC Radio 4 drama The Archers. Torrens also played Cary Warleggan in Poldark in 2015. In 2017, he began a starring role on American television series Preacher, on which he appeared in 33 episodes as Herr Klaus Helmut Starr.

== Filmography ==
=== Film ===
Year	Title	Role	Notes
1984	Oxford Blues	Ian	
1986	Lady Jane	Thomas	
1987	Little Dorrit	Henry Gowan	
1988	A Handful of Dust	Jock	
1989	How to Get Ahead in Advertising	Jonathan	
1989	Bearskin: An Urban Fairytale	Gold-cufflinks	
1990	Mountains of the Moon	Lt. Hesketh	
1990	Eminent Domain	Anton	
1991	The Object of Beauty	Art Evaluator	
1992	Patriot Games	Lord North's 1st Aide	
1993	The Remains of the Day	Doctor Carlisle	
1997	Tomorrow Never Dies	Captain (HMS Bedford)	
1997	Incognito	White (defense attorney)	
1999	Rogue Trader	Simon Jones	
2001	To End All Wars	Lt. Foxworth	
2001	Revelation	Professor Claxton	
2001	The Mystic Masseur	Governor	
2001	All the Queen's Men	British Major	
2005	Pride & Prejudice	Netherfield Butler	
2005	Valiant	Lofty (voice)	
2007	The Mark of Cain	Colonel Hampton	
2007	Flood	Army Liaison Officer Richardson	
2008	Easy Virtue	Lord Hurst	
2009	Dorian Gray	Victor	
2009	St Trinian's 2: The Legend of Fritton's Gold	Heathcoat Parker	
2011	My Week with Marilyn	Sir Kenneth Clark	
2011	War Horse	Major Tompkins	
2011	Love's Kitchen	Health & Safety Official	
2011	The Iron Lady	Ian Gilmour	
2011	Largo Winch II	Invité Plateau CNBC	
2012	Anna Karenina	Prince Shcherbatsky	
2012	Gambit	Savoy Desk Clerk	
2012	Bel Ami	Paul the Butler	
2012	The Scapegoat	George	
2013	The Guest	Frank	Short film
2013	Drone Strike	Wing Commander Ellis	
2014	Gemma Bovery	Rankin	
2014	Effie Gray	Royal Academy / Times Journalist	
2015	The Danish Girl	Dr Hexler	
2015	Star Wars: The Force Awakens	Colonel Kaplan	
2016	Kids in Love	Graham	
2017	Darkest Hour	BBC Producer	
2018	Down a Dark Hall	Professor Farley	
2019	The Aftermath	General Brook	
2024	Joy	Roger Short	
2026	De Gaulle	Bernard Montgomery	
2026	Savage House	Mr. Black	
2026	Vindicta	Adnon Svoboda	
2026	Digger	Schumer	
2027	Wife & Dog †		Post-production

=== Television ===
Year	Title	Role	Notes
1987	The Lenny Henry Show	PC Monkhouse	6 episodes
1989	The Nightmare Years	Major Radford	4 episodes
1989	Voice of the Heart	Kim Cunningham	Television film
1989	Arms and the Man	Bluntschli	BBC television play
1991	Chimera	Windeler	3 episodes
1991	Performance	Nigel Childs	Episode: "Absolute Hell"
1991, 2006	Agatha Christie's Poirot	Major Rich/Jeremy Cloade	Episodes: "The Mystery of the Spanish Chest" (1991) and "Taken at the Flood" (2006)
1992	The Young Indiana Jones Chronicles	Howard Carter	Episodes: "Young Indiana Jones and the Curse of the Jackal" and "Treasure of the Peacock's Eye"
1992	Van der Valk	Michael de Groot	Episode: "Still Waters"
1992	Medics	Jonathan Witley	Episode: "#2.1"
1992–1993	Jeeves and Wooster	Bingo Little	Episodes: "Comrade Bingo" and "Bridegroom Wanted"
1993	Lovejoy	Christian Shotley	Episode: "Fly the Flag"
1993	To Play the King	Andrew Harding	3 episodes
1993	Minder	Muldier	Episode: "The Great Trilby"
1993	Maigret	Chief Commissioner	Episode: "Maigret on the Defensive"
1994	A Dark-Adapted Eye	Chad	2 episodes
1994	The Brittas Empire	John Rawlinson	Episode: "Brussels Calling"
1995	Kavanagh QC	Miles Petersham	Episode: "Nothing But the Truth"
1995	The Adventures of Young Indiana Jones: Treasure of the Peacock's Eye	Howard Carter	Television film
1995	Hamish Macbeth	Peter Peterson	Episode: "S1.E1 The Great Lochdubh Salt Robbery"
1995–2007	The Bill	Various	5 episodes
1996	The Ruth Rendell Mysteries	Michael Quin	2 episodes
1996	Tales from the Crypt	Gordon	Episode: "About Face"
1997	Crime Traveller	Carter	Episode: "A Death in the Family"
1997	Bodyguards	Robert Ferguson	6 episodes
1997	Soldier Soldier	Major Lawrence Brownham	2 episodes
1998	The Unknown Soldier	Major Stephen Phelps	Television film
1999	Murder Most Horrid	News Presenter	Episode: "Elvis, Jesus and Zack"
1999	Big Bad World	Hugh	Episode: "Be Nice to Posh People"
1999	Pure Wickedness	Dr. Phil Gold	3 episodes
1999	Peak Practice	Harry Kenyon	2 episodes
2000	Longitude	Captain Lindsay	TV series
2000	Lorna Doone	Colonel Kirke	Television film
2000	Black Cab	James	Episode: "Busy Body"
2001	Office Gossip	Mark Spenser	Episode: "Moving On"
2002	Shackleton	James McIlroy	Television film
2002	Sunday	Inquiry lawyer	Television film
2002	Ted and Alice	Dr. Handford	3 episodes
2002	Believe Nothing	Le Fanu	Episode: "Get Rich Quick"
2002	Dead Gorgeous	Rex Ballard	Television film
2002	The Project	MoD Official	Television film
2002	TLC	Mr. Copperfield	Episode: "Staying Awake"
2002	Darwin's Daughter	Charles Darwin	Television film
2002	The Many Lives of Albert Walke	Sam	Television film
2003	At Home with the Braithwaites	Mr. Brondby	Episode: "#4.6"
2003	Where the Heart Is	Peter Viner – Cardiologist	Episode: "My Way"
2003	Trial & Retribution	DCS Richard Lawson	Episode: "Suspicion: Part 2"
2003	Second Nature	Frank	Television film
2003	Seven Wonders of the Industrial World	Dr. John Snow	Episode: "The Sewer King"
2003	Charles II: The Power and the Passion	Charles Hart	Episode #1.3
2003	Gifted	Richard Neilson	Television film
2004	Red Cap	Major Tim Garvey	Episode: "Betrayed"
2004	Casualty	Tom Price	Episode: "World Gone Wrong: Part 1"
2004	Messiah: The Promise	DCI Warmseley	2 episodes
2004	Rosemary & Thyme	Donald Westward	Episode: "Up the Garden Path"
2004	When I'm 64	Headmaster	Television film
2004	My Dad's the Prime Minister	Publisher	Episode: "Diaries"
2004	Agatha Christie's Marple	Noël Coward	Episode: "4:50 from Paddington"
2004	Medici: Godfathers of the Renaissance	Cosimo de'Medici	Episode: "Birth of a Dynasty"
2004–2008	Wire in the Blood	DI Brennan / Harrison	3 episodes
2005	Rome	Lucius Tillius Cimber	Episode: "Kalends of February"
2005	Broken News	Sam French, Bullet Points Presenter	6 episodes
2005	The Commander	DCS Les Branton	2 episodes
2005	A View from a Hill	Squire Richards	Television film
2005	The Rotters' Club	English Master	Episode: "The Chick and the Hairy Guy"
2005	The Government Inspector	John Scarlett	Television film
2005	No Angels	Dr. Templar	Episode: "#2.8"
2005	The Last Detective	Captain Boyden	Episode: "Towpaths of Glory"
2005	Ian Fleming: Bondmaker	Noël Coward	Television film
2005	Class of '76	Supt Flood	Television film
2006	Ancient Rome: The Rise and Fall of an Empire	Olympius	Episode: "The Fall of Rome"
2006	Green Wing	Neurosurgeon	2 episodes
2006	The Chatterley Affair	Mervyn Griffith-Jones	Television film
2006	The Path to 9/11	Paul Kessler	2 episodes
2006	Rebus	Andrew Hammill	Episode: "Let It Bleed"
2006	Spooks	Charles Lee	Episode: "5.8"
2006	Missing	Derek Mailer	2 episodes
2006	Dresden	Saundby	Television film
2006	Pinochet in Suburbia	Michael Caplan	Television film
2007	Waking the Dead	Dennis Holland	2 episodes
2007	Doctor Who	Rocastle	Episode: "Human Nature/The Family of Blood"
2007	Lewis	Malcolm Croft	Episode: "Expiation"
2007	The Bad Mother's Handbook	Doctor Gale	Television film
2007	The Chase	Hubert Bryce-Jones	Episode: "2.10"
2007	Consenting Adults	Frances Graham Harrison	Television film
2007	Silent Witness	Richard Tate	2 episodes
2007	Miss Austen Regrets	Edward Austen Knight	Television film
2008	Queen Victoria's Men	Charles Greville	Television film
2009	Heartbeat	James Moncrieff	Episode: "Sweet Sorrow"
2009	Breaking the Mould	Radio Announcer (voice)	Television film
2009	U Be Dead	Peter Higginson	Television film
2009	Collision	Deputy Commissioner Fraser	Episode 1
2010	Secret Diary of a Call Girl	Edward	Episode 3.1
2010, 2016	Midsomer Murders	Group Captain Jeremy Ford / Fergal Jenner	2 episodes
2011	The Promise	Major John Arbuthnot	4 episodes
2011	Outnumbered	Armitage	2 episodes
2011–2014	Silk	HHJ Maikin	4 episodes
2011–2014	Law & Order: UK	Philip Nevins	5 episodes
2012	Hustle	Heinz Zimmermann	Episode: "Gold Finger"
2012	Whitechapel	Travis Underwood	Episode: "Case Two (Part 2)"
2012	The Hollow Crown	Thomas de Mowbray	Episode: "Henry IV, Part 2"
2012	The Fall of Singapore: The Great Betrayal	MI5 Officer	Television film
2012	One Night	Mr. Lerner	3 episodes
2012	Switch	Lord Piermont	Episode: "Summer Solstice Showdown"
2012	Spy	Crispin	Episode: "Codename: Double Oh"
2013	Yes, Prime Minister	Jeremy Burnham	Episode: "The Poisoned Chalice"
2013	Death in Paradise	Guide	Episode: "A Deadly Curse"
2013	Black Mirror	Philip Crane	Episode: "The Waldo Moment"
2013	The Lady Vanishes	Reverend Kenneth Barnes	Television film
2013	Father Brown	Geoffrey Bennett	Episode: "The Devil's Dust"
2013	Breathless	Eric Smallwood	Episode: "#2.1"
2014	Fleming: The Man Who Would Be Bond	Esmond Rothermere	4 episodes
2014	Inspector George Gently	Brigadier Phillips	Episode: "Gently with Honour"
2014	Salting the Battlefield	Jock Calderon	Television film
2014	Playhouse Presents: Marked	Steve Brash	Television film
2014–2016	Grantchester	Sir Edward Kendall	2 episodes (2014), Christmas Special (2016)
2015	The Heavy Water War	John Skinner Wilson	6 episodes
2015	Up the Women	Lawrence	Episodes: "Vote", "Train" and "Bowls"
2015–2017	Versailles	The Duke of Cassel	17 episodes
2015–2019	Poldark	Cary Warleggan	29 episodes
2016	War & Peace	Prince Bagration	2 episodes
2016	Hetty Feather	Reverend Cranbourne	Episode: "Changes"
2016–2019	The Crown	Tommy Lascelles	16 episodes
2017–2019	Preacher	Herr Klaus Helmut Starr	33 episodes
2018	Patrick Melrose	Nicholas Pratt	Miniseries
2018	Death and Nightingales	Maurice Fairbrother	Episode #1.2
2018–2019	Deep State	William Kingsley	6 episodes
2020	Des	Ivan Lawrence QC	1 episode
2020	Roadkill	Joe Lapidus	1 episode
2021–2023	The Nevers	Lord Massen	Main cast
2021–2023	Succession	Peter Munion	4 episodes
2022	Sherwood	Commissioner Charles Dawes	6 episodes
2024	Mr Bates vs The Post Office	Mr Justice Fraser	1 episode
2024	Renegade Nell	Lord Blancheford	Recurring role
2025	Down Cemetery Road	Dr Isaac Wright	Recurring role
2026	Industry	Kevin Rawle	1 episode
2026	War	St. John Smallwood	Main cast

=== Video games ===
Year	Title	Role	Notes
2019	The Dark Pictures Anthology: Man of Medan	The Curator	Voice and motion capture
2020	The Dark Pictures Anthology: Little Hope	The Curator	Voice and motion capture
2021	The Dark Pictures Anthology: House of Ashes	The Curator	Voice and motion capture
2022	Elden Ring	Radahn / Varré	Voice
2022	The Dark Pictures Anthology: The Devil in Me	The Curator	Voice and motion capture
2023	Warhammer Age of Sigmar: Realms of Ruin	Nighthaunt Commander	Voice
2024	Elden Ring Shadow of the Erdtree	Radahn	Voice
2026	Directive 8020	The Curator	Voice and motion capture
