= Torrent (Elden Ring) =

- Concept art of Torrent
- First appearance: Elden Ring (2022)
- Created by: FromSoftware

In-universe information
- Species: Spectral steed

Torrent is a fictional steed in the 2022 action role-playing game and soulslike Elden Ring developed by FromSoftware. A ghostly being known as a "spectral steed", Torrent chooses the player character as his new owner. He subsequently assists the player in their quest to become Elden Lord, the restorer of a magical artifact called the Elden Ring, by letting them more easily traverse the game's world, the Lands Between. The first rideable animal, or "mount", in the Soulsborne series, he can be summoned and sent away using a special gold whistle bequeathed to the player early on in the game by the character Melina.

Despite being called a horse, Torrent possesses numerous goat-like traits, such as horns. He has the ability to double-jump, stand on narrow ledges, and scale tall cliffs through the use of magical "spiritsprings" scattered throughout the game world. The player may also heal Torrent using food created from Rowa, a fictional fruit. Used for the majority of the game, Torrent's appearance cannot be changed in the base version of the game, though new selectable skins called Spectral Steed Regalia were added in the game's Tarnished Edition. Torrent has been praised by various critics as one of the best video game mounts due to his immediate summoning and responsive controls while on horseback, enabling significant freedom of movement. Players' reliance on Torrent was also noted as creating a significant emotional attachment to the character.

== Features ==
Torrent is first gained by the player very early in the game, when they rest at the three sites of graces in the Overworld. There, they are met by Melina, who, when her offered bargain is agreed to, agrees to be their Maiden, a form of guide, and presents them with the Spectral Steed Whistle. The whistle allows the player to immediately summon Torrent. Spirit springs located at fixed points in the overworld allow Torrent to jump far higher than normal, safely landing in otherwise inaccessible places. Torrent can be made to gallop with a button press; constantly mashing said button enables the fastest speed possible when traversing the world. Torrent has the ability to passively regenerate health slowly, though due to a developer oversight this has been noted as making him unable to restore his health fully in certain cases. The player can also restore Torrent's health immediately by using a Rowa item, or when they heal themselves using an item known as the Flask of Crimson Tears.

In the game's lore, Torrent's provenance is unclear, but he serves as Melina's traveling companion before meeting the player. It is hinted that Torrent's former master is someone known to the character Ranni the Witch, who was given the Spirit Calling Bell and Lone Wolf Ashes by the same person. A teaser image for the Shadow of the Erdtree DLC depicts a character thought to be the demigod Miquella riding Torrent, which caused fans to speculate that he was responsible for creating the Spectral Steed Whistle, if not being Torrent's former owner.

Torrent is completely dedicated to the player's choices, willing to follow them even in the event the player chooses the apocalyptic Frenzied Flame ending and diverges from Melina, willingly sacrificing himself to said flame. In this ending, Melina is seen recovering the Spectral Steed Whistle from the ruined Erdtree before the whistle burns and turns to ash.

The appearance of Torrent typically cannot be customized outside of player mods. However, the Tarnished Edition of the game includes new skins called Spectral Steed Regalia obtainable throughout the game world that change Torrent's appearance and armor. They were later brought to the existing versions of the game via a USD $5 downloadable content pack.

== Development ==
Dataminers revealed that Torrent had an unused bucking animation that would launch enemies into the air. Possibly removed due to being too difficult to land, the animation was reused with several mounted enemies, including the Royal Knight Loretta boss fight. Other unused animations, such as Torrent grazing and shaking his mane, indicated that Torrent existed independently of the player at some point in development. In 2024, dataminers also discovered that Melina and Torrent were meant to first encounter the player on a sandy beach, which was changed to the current opening of the player waking up in a cave instead.

A development glitch resulted in players using certain types of weapons, such as spears, swordspears and greatswords, being unable to double-jump after falling off a ledge on Torrent, causing them to fall to their deaths.

== Critical reception ==
Alan Wen of VG247 called Torrent possibly the best mount in a video game, stating that most rideable animals in video games were "annoying", such as those featured in The Legend of Zelda: Ocarina of Time, The Witcher 3: Wild Hunt, and Red Dead Redemption 2. He compared Torrent to the horses in Uncharted 3 and The Last of Us, "extensions" of the player's body rather than having their own will. Calling Torrent a "highlight" and an "important part of the core gameplay", he noted that Torrent's ability to appear and disappear removed the limitations of most mounts. He further praised Torrent's double-jump ability, as "a statement of intent", allowing the player to reach places that would otherwise be impossible. Wen continued on to laud the horseback combat, noting that one of his favorite moves was "riding while charging up a sword attack, with the blade running along the ground [...] before releasing the trigger to swing it up straight into your enemy's face". Also describing Torrent as "the player's escape route", he summed up his view that Torrent alone made the game worth purchasing.

Nicole Clark of Polygon, similarly, characterized Torrent as "the ultimate horse companion", saying that he made the world more manageable, "enhancing freedom, exploration, and tomfoolery". Saying that "to ride Torrent is to know peace, if only briefly", she stated that being able to have a mount "made playing a FromSoftware game much more approachable for a first timer", due to the ability to battle on horseback, run from difficult fights and gallop through densely-packed hostile areas. Stating that Torrent "enabled my basest impulses and most chaotic dreams", she stated that she used Torrent to attack any creature that approached just to see what happened. Calling Torrent's double-jump "the real secret sauce of exploration", she noted that she was more saddened when Torrent died in combat than the player character themselves. Luke Plunkett of Kotaku brought attention to a review of Torrent in The Mane Quest, a blog dedicated to video game horses, saying that he could not "un-see" the goat-like anatomy of Torrent, noting that his legs may have been designed to resemble the movements of a goat in order to ensure smooth movement during gameplay, despite it being "weird" and "aesthetically jarring". He stated that the developers may have decided that a normal horse was "not fucked-up enough" compared to a horse with goat legs.

Torrent was not universally praised, and Rich Stanton of PC Gamer criticized the horse as "not having much utility" compared to using fast travel, and having a large turning radius. However, Fraser Brown of the same publication disagreed with this stance, calling Torrent "my best horse pal", and "an integral part of the world", and noting that he was "the only way to reach some places". Stanton responded that combat on Torrent sometimes involved "flailing away" into the air without hitting an enemy, a contrast to Elden Ring's otherwise precise combat while on foot, saying that it felt "a bit weightless". Imogen Mellor, also of PC Gamer, expressed doubt that Torrent was even a horse, saying "it's a goat". Alice Ruppert of The Mane Quest criticized the horse's modeling, asserting his joints don't move correctly.

Fans have introduced numerous mods allowing the player to replace Torrent with different models. These include giving Torrent the appearance of horses ridden by enemy NPCs, and more outlandish ones such as making him a modern main battle tank. Due to the issues regarding Torrent's maximum health remaining static throughout the game, some mods have made the character invincible, which Josh Broadwell of PCGamesN felt was a crucial fix for the character.

=== Tarnished Edition reception ===
The Spectral Steed Regalia included in the Tarnished Edition were generally praised for their design, with criticism directed towards the USD $5 price for existing game versions rather than it being offered as a free patch. The DLC was quickly compared to the 2006 horse armor controversy for The Elder Scrolls IV: Oblivion, in which players complained about the fact that horse armor was sold separately.
