= Malenia =

Elden Ring boss

- Concept art of Malenia from Elden Ring
- First appearance: Elden Ring (2022)
- Voiced by: Pippa Bennett-Warner

Malenia, Blade of Miquella (Japanese: ミケラの刃、マレニア, Hepburn: Mikera no Yaiba, Marenia) is a character in the 2022 video game Elden Ring. Malenia appears as a tall, red-haired woman, wearing a golden valkyrie-like armour and prosthetics replacing both legs and her right arm, the latter of which is attached to a katana-like blade. In the lore of the game, she is a demigod princess and one of the land's most potent warriors and military commanders, having never been bested in battle. Despite featuring as an optional boss fight for the game, Malenia is prominent in related media, such as trailers, television spots, and promotional items. She is regarded as one of the game's main mascots.

Malenia is considered one of Elden Ring's most memorable encounters, where her boss fight received massive media attention for its high level of difficulty. She was also praised for her design and story. Her boss battle is a source of many unusual challenges, such as using a dance pad or voice chat as a controller. The player "Let Me Solo Her" gained attention for offering assistance to players due to the difficulty of her boss fight, fighting her with no clothes, a pot on his head, and a pair of katana.

== Appearances ==
Malenia first appeared in the video game Elden Ring, serving as an optional boss fight available later in the game. Within the game's lore, she is the demigod child of Queen Marika and her second husband, Radagon. Alongside her twin brother Miquella, Malenia was born as an Empyrean, a powerful being chosen as a candidate to create a new age and rule it as a god, but both were cursed. In Malenia's case, she was cursed with Scarlet Rot, a devastating disease caused by a godlike being, and one that begins to putrefy her body, causing her to lose her legs, eyes, and right arm. In an attempt to save Malenia from being consumed, Miquella utilized Unalloyed Gold, a material capable of warding off the influence of Outer Gods, to break the rot god's influence on her. Malenia learned her combat style from a nomadic character called the Blind Swordsman. Mastering his technique gave her "wings of unparalleled strength", while also helping her resist the rot.

During a civil war known as the Shattering, Malenia led her knights on an undefeated campaign across the land, winning many victories, including against at least one fellow demigod relative. Her campaign eventually brought her into conflict with her half-brother Starscourge Radahn, with her encountering heavy resistance from his army before the two demigods met each other and dueled to a stalemate. At the end of their battle, Malenia unleashed the Scarlet Rot and lost her special Unalloyed Gold needle. Radahn and the surrounding region were left devastated by rot. With both sides unable to claim true victory, Malenia lost control of the disease and was dragged unconscious by one of her few remaining knights to the Haligtree, a holy tree created by Miquella. After Miquella is kidnapped, she inadvertently causes the tree to rot from the inside during her slumber. She awakens when the player encounters her at the base of the Haligtree's interior, engaging them in battle. If the player manages to deal enough damage to her, she is overcome by the rot once more, earning the title Goddess of Rot.

If the player manages to defeat her, Malenia's body fades away while she compliments the player's strength, having awaited the coming of a challenger who could face her in single combat and live to tell the tale. In her place is left a large red flower with powers of rebirth. If the player has completed a certain NPC quest earlier in the game, they are then given the option to return the Unalloyed Gold Needle to Malenia's flower form. In doing so the player "fulfills a part of what [the NPC] had set out to accomplish in her journey," that being to "return something to Malenia; a means to restore the will and dignity that she lost after her battle with Radahn." The red flower gives the player another Unalloyed Gold Needle in return, which can be used to suppress the Outer God of Frenzied Flame if inherited, and avert the otherwise locked ending.

== Development ==
Elden Ring received a day-one patch that modified various aspects of the game, including making Malenia less difficult. In the original version, her first phase was more aggressive, including using the attack Waterfowl Dance at any point unlike the later version, which requires her to be below 80 percent health. A popular tactic to defeating Malenia, an incantation called Swarm of Flies, was nerfed via a patch. This same patch erroneously made Malenia more difficult, allowing her to heal "almost at will." This was fixed in a later patch. It was believed that this was only affecting battles when other players were summoned online. When designing the downloadable content for Elden Ring, Elden Ring Shadow of the Erdtree, the game's director, Hidetaka Miyazaki, stated that there would be optional bosses tuned similarly to Malenia in terms of difficulty.

== Promotion and reception ==
To commemorate the release of Elden Ring in Japan, in February 2022 life-size statues of the character were exhibited across the country, with additional Elden Ring related merchandise sold at the locations. Meanwhile, a smaller statue of Malenia was included in the Collector's Edition of Elden Ring. In October 2023, S.H.Figuarts released a miniature figure of Malenia alongside several other Elden Ring characters. In April 2024 for the release of the Elden Ring's expansion Shadow of the Erdtree, Bandai Namco and PureArts released a limited production 95 centimeter, 3 kilogram polyresin replica of Malenia's prosthetic arm.

Malenia has received positive reception, identified by Polygon writer Nico Deyo as capturing the Elden Ring audience upon her first appearance. Discussing her boss battle, Deyo felt that her first phase was "designed to thwart and emasculate," commenting that there was a "deep humor in the idea of a woman whose very attacks steal health from you to empower herself." They commented on how her second form covers her body in rot except for her breasts and genitals, which "evokes a confusing mixture of fear and titillation, arguing that the fact that she wears no armor feels "not like a vulnerability but a challenge." They felt that Malenia was an exemplification of FromSoftware's typicality of writing women in their games, stating that they share a "specific brokenness; disfigurement, abandonment, and loss" and that they are "afflicted by gender" to where the only cure, when they are an obstacle, is to "enact succinct violence." Commenting on the personalities and expressions of women in FromSoftware's games, they felt that they tended to be either "demure, quiet, void of needs or motivations" or "shrieking, horrifying hysteria when encountered in combat." They also discussed sexist commentary and behavior they observed in some players surrounding fighting and beating Malenia.

Kotaku writer Ashley Bardhan discussed their appreciation for monstrous fairies, such as the yaksha and erlking, mythos that she felt Malenia fit well into. She felt that, unlike many other fairies in video games, Malenia is strong because of her fairy-like form, not weaker. She also expressed a desire to have had a character like Malenia 15 years ago to convey that women in video games were more than a "pretty pink princess, total eye candy, [or] subdued final girl." Screen Rant writer Thomas McNulty called her the face of Elden Ring, describing her design as iconic and memorable due to her "flowing red hair," valkyrie helmet, and large prosthetic arm. He also found her backstory sympathetic, finding her desire to protect her brother a noble one.

=== As a video game boss ===
Malenia is considered the hardest boss in Elden Ring and among the most difficult created by Elden Ring developer FromSoftware. Data released by Bandai Namco in March 2023 found that Malenia had killed 10 players every second since launch and has been fought 329 million times. As of April 2023, the fastest a player has defeated Malenia was 15 seconds by the Elden Ring community manager RS_Lionheart. The level of difficulty behind Malenia led to a player with the username Let me solo her to offer assistance to players fighting Malenia by fighting her alone in the player's place. He first appeared in April 2022, his character wearing nothing but a pot on his head and wielding two katana. Let Me Solo Her performed his 1000th Malenia kill on a YouTube livestream. As of February 2024, Let Me Solo Her professes to have killed her 6000-7000 times. He also stated that he may retire soloing Malenia upon the release of the downloadable content for Elden Ring titled Shadow of the Erdtree. Another player, JPNB, vowed to fight Malenia weekly with a different build each time until FromSoftware announced downloadable content for Elden Ring. He stated that Let Me Solo Her inspired him to do this. JPNB retired from this after the announcement was made. In some of these builds, JPNB would engage in "D&D-style role-playing with several characters." JPNB stated that he has a spreadsheet of unused builds.

Due to this level of challenge, people have attempted to beat her in alternative ways. Players have employed alternative methods to fighting her, such as Twitch.tv streamer MissMikkaa, who spent 15 hours and 553 attempts before successfully killing Malenia at level one while using a dance pad. A player named Perri Karyal managed to defeat Malenia using an EEG machine, using it to pick up on electrical activity, made conductive using a saline solution. She accomplished this by training the device to recognize certain states of her brain to attack Malenia. A player with a broken arm successfully beat Malenia at level one. YouTuber PointCrow's goldfish Tortellini managed to defeat Malenia's first phase using a camera that selects inputs based on which part of its tank it is in, receiving assistance from PointCrow. YouTuber Veganiele made a point of defeating Malenia without taking damage using a new weapon each day, succeeding in doing so nearly every day. A streamer called Larxa managed to defeat Malenia using a mod that allows her to issue commands using her voice.

Multiple mods have been created to make Malenia more difficult. A mod was created to replace all enemies in the game with Malenia, a challenge which was eventually completed by Let Me Solo Her. Another mod, titled "Unalloyed Malenia," was created by Nexus Mods user "MiquellaTheUnalloyed," which was intended to make her an "interesting challenge" for people who are well-acquainted with the regular Malenia battle. The FromSoftware video game Sekiro: Shadows Die Twice received a mod that added Malenia as an opponent titled "Malenia - Blade of Ashina." A mod was created that allowed other bosses to fight against Malenia, with most bosses losing handily to her. Outside of video games, former Dungeons & Dragons designer Dan Dillon created a custom monster stat block for Malenia, designed to be a challenge to a party of four players in the game at max level.
