= Stormveil Castle =

Fictional castle

- Screenshot of the front gate and outer wall of Stormveil Castle
- Created by: FromSoftware
- Genre: Fantasy

In-universe information
- Type: Castle
- Location: Limgrave

Stormveil Castle is a fictional castle depicted in the 2022 action role-playing game Elden Ring, developed by FromSoftware. It is the game's first "legacy dungeon", a self-contained dungeon crawl designed to be reminiscent of earlier games in the Dark Souls series. As such, it also functions as a tutorial for the game's mechanics. Located in the Limgrave area of the Lands Between, the continent upon which Elden Ring is set, Stormveil's ruler, Godrick the Grafted, is a demigod who has fallen into disrepute due to his practice of "grafting", a form of biological augmentation using the severed body parts of other beings. The castle is seen covered in organic thorns and pockmarks, signs that it is being consumed from beneath by Godwyn, a former demigod who has become the "Prince of Death" in his undead state, following his assassination. All of its soldiers and guards have long since lost their minds following the shattering of the Elden Ring.

While the castle can be skipped using a hidden route, defeating Godrick is necessary to claim one of the Great Runes, items that bestow power on the player character and are needed to continue the game's storyline. Other notable characters first seen in Stormveil include the boss Margit the Fell, who guards the castle's front gate, Nepheli Loux, a female warrior from the Badlands, Sorcerer Rogier, a traveling magician, and Gatekeeper Gostoc, a scheming and greedy castle servant, who can be seen kicking Godrick's corpse after the player defeats him and reloads the area.

Stormveil has been praised by critics as one of the best-designed areas in Elden Ring and FromSoftware games as a whole, calling it both a highly-effective tutorial and a vehicle for the game's lore. Certain enemies within Stormveil Castle have also been singled out as particularly challenging foes, such as the castle's trademark Warhawks, huge and deadly birds of prey that can toss explosive barrels.

== Level content ==
At the beginning of Stormveil Castle, the boss character Margit: the Fell Omen attempts to block the player's way. When Margit is defeated, the player gains access to Stormveil's closed front portcullis. They are forced to enter the nearby gatehouse, where the character Gatekeeper Gostoc offers them the choice of navigating "around" the guards, or entering the heavily fortified main gate. Should the player choose the standard, longer path, which functions akin to a linear tutorial, they must fight through several bladed Warhawks, which are large predatory birds whose feet have been replaced by long, sword-like blades, and then climb upwards while navigating one of the castle's broken walls. Blocked by a locked door, the player must enter a darkened room, in which they are attacked by a powerful knight. The player may kill the knight using direct combat, stealth, or simply run past and take the key from a corpse. Unless the player has killed Gostoc earlier, he will lock the player in the dark room. He can be heard laughing after doing so, though the key to exit the room is in a chest across from the door.

The player emerges at the top of the castle, where they are able to explore the rooftops. At this point, they can descend to the castle's main plaza, also accessible from the shorter but significantly more well-defended route. A road from the plaza leads to the castle cemetery, site of the boss fight with Godrick the Grafted. Near the entrance to the cemetery is a room where the player can befriend Nepheli Loux, allowing her to aid in the boss fight. Halfway through the Godrick fight, he grafts the head of a deceased dragon onto his arm, giving him flamethrower-like abilities. When Godrick is defeated, the player gains his Great Rune and exits the castle to Liurnia of the Lakes, ending the level.

A secret area of the castle known as the Basement Grave can be accessed by jumping from a ledge near the plaza. The player encounters and can choose to fight an Ulcerated Tree Spirit miniboss, after which they find the misshapen corpse of Godwyn that has been slowly infecting the castle. Checking the corpse initiates a quest chain that can lead the player to the secret character Ranni the Witch. Stormveil is also entirely skippable through the use of an obscure side path on the castle's eastern side. This allows the player to emerge directly into Liurnia, though they still cannot obtain the Great Rune unless they infiltrate the castle.

== Reception ==
Stephen T. Wright of GameSpot noted that Stormveil Castle was one of the site's best overall video game levels of 2022, describing it as "a celebration of how far FromSoftware has come since the days of Demon's Souls". Calling it a lengthy tribute to Demon Souls's first level, Boletarian Palace, he said that certain sections of it were "seemingly ripped directly from Demon's Souls", such as exploration of the castle's broken wall, and its inner courtyards. However, he called it unique in that it combined an "open, exploration-driven structure" with "interlocking paths" more like previous games. While he praised the initial choice of two potential ways into the castle, he further expounded that there was a secret third way in behind the castle that was not immediately obvious, saying that "one of the main achievements of [Elden Ring's] open world" was allowing the player to discover such a thing themselves. He called one of the level's most memorable moments falling from a high ledge to encounter one of the game's Crucible Knight enemies, a miniboss who nevertheless took him more tries than Godrick. He summed up his view that none of the game's subsequent dungeons "quite measure up to the scope and ambitions" of Stormveil Castle, extending the criticism to the game's second half as a whole.

William Hughes of The A.V. Club revisited Stormveil a year after the game's release, describing it as "one of the best monster-filled castles ever designed" by FromSoftware, as well as a "thesis statement" that the company had not "lost its mind" when they decided to develop an open-world game. Saying that he initially "despaired" at what seemed to be a change in design philosophy towards a lack of "meticulous craft or level design", he stated that Stormveil abruptly changed his opinion, showing that the open world was "connective tissue" between legacy dungeons. He praised the "dedication to choice and exploration" demonstrated by the level, giving as an example the choice to heed the advice of Gatekeeper Gostoc and take a side path, despite being a "transparently murderous plot", or enter the main gate of the castle and face a "hail of ballista fire".

Saying that the level hides secrets in "seemingly innocuous places", Hughes stated that players could either go straight through, or explore and be rewarded. He called Stormveil "special" amongst other castles in FromSoftware-developed games, due to its "genuine, good faith effort to create an entire vast medieval living space for your Tarnished hero to smash their way through", and described its layout as "logical". Despite calling Stormveil Castle a "mere trial run" for the later area of Leyndell, he nevertheless called it the more important of the two, saying that it was proof that "some of the best level designers in the business could not only still demonstrate their craft, but improve upon it".

JM8 of The Escapist called Stormveil Castle the game's "true tutorial", stating that, like the game's other Legacy Dungeons, it "invisibly taught and conditioned" the player through both level and enemy design. He described the first quarter of the level as "designed to encourage and teach verticality" by placing both rewards, in the form of items, and enemies such as birds above the player's head, forcing them to look up and carefully observe the environment. Subsequently, the player encounters a dark room where they are taught avoidance and stealth. They are faced with an extremely powerful knight guarding a key required for a door, making the player have to flee past them if they do not want to be defeated again and again.

JM8 continued that the first interior Site of Grace in Stormveil was where it stopped being a tutorial and became an immersive sim stealth mission. However, he called the level's tutorial techniques overly hands-off, describing it as "incredibly linear and punishing" if players did not understand how to properly navigate the castle. He gave the example of a section of the castle's roof that is "seemingly linear", forcing the player to face numerous Warhawks if they did not realize they could jump off the ledge and navigate the castle's lower rooftops. Suggesting that the door after the checkpoint have been locked instead, he said that would have forced the player to explore and figure out how to open it up.

Hilton Webster of TheGamer said that Stormveil "feels like a full castle", noting that it "surmises much of what Elden Ring excels at", and calling it "something that could've never worked in a previous Soulsborne game". Cass Marshall of Polygon stated that she did not "care" for Stormveil Castle's bomb-wielding Warhawks, saying that they made her " feel less like a legendary hero and more like Wile E. Coyote", furthermore saying that she died to one of them more than she did to Margit".
