= Elden Ring Nightreign =

2025 video game

- Developer: FromSoftware
- Publisher: Bandai Namco Entertainment: JP: FromSoftware
- Director: Junya Ishizaki
- Producers: Yasuhiro Kitao; Shingo Kawabata
- Programmer: Yuki Kido
- Composers: Shoi Miyazawa; Tai Tomisawa; Soma Tanizaki; Yoshikazu Takayama; Yuka Kitamura
- Platforms: PlayStation 4; PlayStation 5; Windows; Xbox One; Xbox Series X/S
- Release: May 30, 2025
- Genres: Action role-playing, roguelike
- Modes: Single-player, multiplayer

Elden Ring Nightreign (Note: Japanese: エルデンリング ナイトレイン, Hepburn: Eruden Ringu Naitorein) is a 2025 action role-playing game developed by FromSoftware and published by Bandai Namco Entertainment. The game is a roguelike spin-off to Elden Ring, using many of its features and gameplay elements, and focuses on roguelike and cooperative mechanics. Players control Nightfarers on a quest to dispel the reign of night.

It was revealed at The Game Awards 2024, and was released for the PlayStation 4, PlayStation 5, Windows, Xbox One, and Xbox Series X/S on May 30, 2025. Upon release, it topped the May sales charts across all platforms, received generally positive reviews and has sold over 5 million units.

== Gameplay ==
The game is set in a procedurally generated version of Limgrave, now named Limveld, the first open-world area of Elden Ring. While the game has a single-player mode, it is intended to be played cooperatively by teams of three players who collaborate over three in-game days to prepare for the final boss. Similar to battle royale games, Nightreign features a shrinking gameplay area which resets after players defeat the minor boss at the end of each in-game day. Every match features a different map of randomized enemies, items, and locations. There is also the chance for the map to feature a "Shifting Earth" event, where the map is drastically changed to feature a massive dungeon with more bosses and more valuable rewards.

An updated game mode featuring more difficult versions of the Nightlords, the Everdark Sovereigns, was released starting on June 19, 2025, with each Everdark Sovereign starting off in its second phase and progressing to a newly added third phase. Everdark versions of the Nightlord bosses Adel, Fulghor, Gnoster, Maris, Caligo, Libra, and Gladius were released on June 19, June 26, July 9, July 31, August 6, August 13, and August 20, respectively.

A downloadable content update titled The Forsaken Hollows was released on December 4th, 2025. The expansion adds two expedition bosses, new night bosses (including the Divine Beast Dancing Lion from Shadow of the Erdtree, the Demon Prince from Dark Souls III, and Artorias from Dark Souls), new locations, a new map (labelled as a shifting earth event), and two new Nightfarers: Undertaker and Scholar. The expansion is accessible from the Jar merchant at the Roundtable Hold.

== Story ==
=== Setting and characters ===
Elden Ring Nightreign takes place in an alternative timeline of the Lands Between. After the Shattering, a cataclysmic event called the Primordial Night descended upon the Lands Between, plunging the realm into an eternal reign of night. Monstrous creatures from other realms now populate the land, with eight beings of tremendous power, known only as the Nightlords, ruling over an alternative version of the Limgrave region known as "Limveld", where the effects of said cataclysm shift the land to complete chaos. As a result, Marika's religion has been abandoned (except for a few churches still standing) and the people no longer pray to her or the Elden Ring. The Erdtree is absent from Limveld, its golden hue no longer visible. The Roundtable Hold, now dilapidated and in a state of disrepair, has become a safe haven for warriors dubbed "Nightfarers" who are summoned to end the eternal Night.

=== Synopsis ===
While the game has a main story, there are also individual storylines for each of the eight playable Nightfarers called Remembrances. Certain Remembrances will result in different game endings.

The main story starts with the Wylder, a greatsword-wielding Nightfarer, running from the darkness and eventually facing the Fell Omen. Wylder then wakes up in the Roundtable Hold and is greeted by the Priestess, who tells him that the Nightfarers' goal is to defeat the Nightlords and end the Night. Here, the Wylder meets other Nightfarers, including Guardian, an avian pinionfolk knight who uses a tall shield and halberd; Ironeye, a bow-wielding assassin; Raider, a pirate berserker from outside the Lands Between; Recluse, an isolated witch; and Executor, a former Crucible Knight who specializes in the katana. Additionally, the Nightfarers may find a magic pocketwatch that belongs to the Priestess, who will then reveal herself as the dagger-wielding Duchess, and encounter the Revenant, a Nightfarer in the form of a possessed doll who uses a lyre to summon spirits to fight in her stead.

Following The Forsaken Hollows DLC, two new Nightfarers join the Roundtable Hold; Undertaker, a nun who uses a battlemace; and Scholar, an academic who uses a cane sword.

After the Nightfarers defeat the Nightlord Gladius, they realize that the threat of darkness still lingers, and that they must defeat more Nightlords. After defeating four different Nightlords, the Roundtable Hold begins to falter and crumble as the Night grows stronger, and the Priestess/Duchess explains that the leader, and first, of the Nightlords has revealed himself: Heolstor the Night Aspect, the Primordial Night manifested into being. After defeating Heolstor, the player will receive the Primordial Nightlord's Rune, leading to one of multiple endings dependent on actions throughout the game.

- The Endless Night ending is achieved after completing all of the Remembrance quests for Ironeye and then defeating Heolstor as Ironeye with his Remembrance item, the Edge of Order, equipped. When the player approaches the figure in the hold, Ironeye will kill the figure, condemning Limveld to eternal Night, for the sake of Those Who Live in Death.
- The New Night ending is achieved after completing all of the Remembrance quests for Wylder and then defeating Heolstor as Wylder with his Remembrance item, the Larval Tear, equipped. Wylder believes that if the night ends, his sister will perish, being bound to the hold as its Priestess. Wylder uses the Larval Tear to rebirth himself as Heolstor and start the night anew, for the sake of his sister.
- The Night of Love ending is achieved after completing all of the Remembrance quests for Recluse and then defeating Heolstor as Recluse with her Remembrance item, the Bone-like Stone, equipped. Instead of ending the night, Recluse follows the sounds of a baby crying and finds the "child" which she had made from the Primordial Night, insinuated to be Night itself. She gently cradles and comforts it.
- In the Dawn ending, the player returns to the Roundtable Hold and offers the Primordial Nightlord's Rune to the shriveled figure. The rune is unbound, the Primordial Night's intervention is undone, and the Lands Between returns to its post-Shattering state, setting the stage for the events of Elden Ring. In a post-credits scene, the Night gazes upon the Lands Between, but this time departs, its attempt of taking over the Lands Between having failed.

In the Forsaken Hollows DLC, the Nightfarers must face a new threat, victims of the Night merged into one vengeful being, the Dreglord Straghess. With the help of both the Scholar and the Undertaker, the Nightfarers challenge the Weapon-Bequeathed Harmonia, beings that "descend when the world desires balance". After their defeat, balance is disrupted, which allows the Nightfarers to successfully track down and defeat Straghess, allowing them to resume their duty.

== Development ==
Elden Ring Nightreign was developed by FromSoftware for the PlayStation 4, PlayStation 5, Windows, Xbox One, and Xbox Series X/S. Bandai Namco Entertainment registered the trademark for "Nightreign" on October 24, 2024, with it being revealed at The Game Awards 2024 in December. It was scheduled to be released on May 30, 2025. The first network test took place in February 2025 on the PlayStation 5 and Xbox Series X/S, with players able to register from January 10 to 20.

Nightreign is directed by Junya Ishizaki, who worked as a designer on Dark Souls, Bloodborne, Dark Souls III, and Elden Ring. Fantasy author George R. R. Martin, who wrote the backstory of Elden Ring, was not involved with Nightreign.

== Reception ==
Reception

Aggregate scores
Aggregator	Score
Metacritic	(PC) 79/100 (PS5) 77/100 (XSXS) 84/100
OpenCritic	76% recommend (Note: Based on 179 reviews); 33% recommend (The Forsaken Hollows) (Note: Based on 12 reviews)

Review scores
Publication	Score
Destructoid	8.5/10
Digital Trends	3.5/5
Eurogamer	4/5
Famitsu	34/40
Game Informer	8/10
GameSpot	9/10
GamesRadar+	3.5/5
Hardcore Gamer	4/5
IGN	7/10
NME	3/5
PC Gamer (US)	80/100
PCGamesN	6/10
Push Square	8/10
RPGFan	75/100
Shacknews	9/10
The Guardian	3/5
Video Games Chronicle	3/5
VG247	5/5
VideoGamer.com	9/10

Elden Ring Nightreign received "generally favorable" reviews from critics, according to review aggregator Metacritic. OpenCritic determined that 77% of critics recommended the game. IGN appreciated and recommended the game, but lightly criticized the lack of an "in-game journal to refresh you on events"

Elden Ring Nightreign sold 2 million units within its first 24 hours from release, and 3.5 million within five days. In July 2025, FromSoftware announced that the game had sold over five million units. It was the 14th best-selling game of 2025 in the US.

=== Awards ===
Year	Award	Category	Result	Ref.
2025	Japan Game Awards	Award for Excellence	Won	
2025	Golden Joystick Awards	Best Multiplayer Game	Nominated	
2025	The Game Awards 2025	Best Multiplayer Game	Nominated	
2026	The Steam Awards 2025	Best Game You Suck At	Nominated	
2026	22nd British Academy Games Awards	Multiplayer	Nominated	
