= Starscourge Radahn =

- Radahn, mindless and impaled with numerous spears. He is riding Leonard (bottom center).
- First appearance: Elden Ring (2022)
- Created by: Hidetaka Miyazaki
- Voiced by: Pip Torrens

In-universe information
- Race: Demigod
- Spouse: Miquella the Kind (consort of)
- Home: Redmane Castle

Starscourge Radahn (also called General Radahn) is a fictional character from the 2022 action role-playing video game Elden Ring developed by FromSoftware. A demigod, he functions as both a prominent figure in the history of the game's fictional universe, the Lands Between, and one of its main bosses. Radahn is first encountered in Caelid, a region that has been consumed by the Scarlet Rot toxin.

"Conqueror of the Stars", Radahn was one of the world's most powerful warriors, halting the destiny-guiding stars themselves using gravitational magic. During the Shattering, an immense war of succession, Radahn battled his half sister Malenia to a standstill in the Caelid wilds. In an attempt to break the stalemate, Malenia snapped the Unalloyed Gold Needle suppressing her affliction and unleashed the Scarlet Rot, which eventually engulfed all of Caelid. Radahn himself lost his sanity to the Rot and became a mindless, man-eating monster, causing his soldiers to create the Radahn Festival to attempt to kill him and preserve his honor.

Defeating Radahn, while optional, is required for the player to obtain one of the game's Great Runes, shards of the Elden Ring necessary to progress the storyline. It is also needed for the optional quest of Ranni the Witch, and to enter the Shadow of the Erdtree DLC. Within the DLC, he is fought again at full strength as Promised Consort Radahn after being resurrected in a different demigod's body.

Radahn's lore and first boss fight were praised by critics, who were impressed by the scale of the first fight and Radahn's complex backstory, calling him one of the game's best bosses and characters, and the Radahn Festival one of the game's most memorable events. Hidetaka Miyazaki also revealed the first encounter with Radahn as his favorite boss battle. The second battle has been called one of the hardest bosses in FromSoftware's history.

== Appearances ==
Starscourge Radahn was the child of Radagon - a red-haired champion of the Golden Order, the game's divine order and Rennala, queen of Caria, heading the Academy of Raya Lucaria, a school of sorcery. Therefore, he is the brother of the demigods Lunar Princess Ranni - later called Ranni the Witch - and Praetor Rykard. Radagon and Rennala's marriage cemented an alliance between the Golden Order and the Carian nobles, who had previously been deadlocked in battle. Since he was a young child, Radahn deeply admired Godfrey, Marika's First Elden Lord, and models himself after him, adopting Godfrey's lion motif.

While Radagon resented his red hair, a curse of the Giants and their Fell God, who had once posed the greatest threat to the Golden Order, Radahn viewed it as a positive, believing it indicative of heroic qualities. Despite following in Radagon's footsteps as a powerful general, Radahn also studied in Sellia, a town of sorcery located in Caelid. After realizing he was growing to a giant size and would be forced to abandon his beloved yet scrawny steed, he chose to study gravitational magic under the tutelage of a Alabaster Lord, a being originating from a meteor. This ultimately allowed him to lower his weight to almost nothing, and continue to ride his horse despite dwarfing the horse in size. Over the course of his life, Radahn is reputed as the mightiest demigod, an honorable warrior, an intelligent tactician, and a powerful sorcerer, gaining the respect and fear of many for his greatness. While known to enjoy battle, Radahn is noted to be kind, admired by many for his noble qualities, and is a caring leader to his personal army, the Redmanes. While studying under the Alabaster Lord, Radahn formed a friendly rivalry with Gaius, Messmer's friend and leader of his men. Gaius and Messmer acted as elder brothers to Radahn, with Gaius creating the "Blades of Stone" gravity sorcery as proof of their competition.

During his childhood, Radahn apparently made a vow with his half brother Miquella, who said that if Radahn upheld his vow, they would rule together as consorts in a "world of peace". Radahn used his gravity magic to "challenge the stars", succeeding in a "crushing victory" and halting their movement entirely. The Stars also halted the destiny of Miquella. This remains the case even when Radahn has long since lost his mind, and his death is required to restore their normal movement. Upon the advent of the Shattering, a war following the shattering of the Elden Ring, Radahn failed to capture the capital of Leyndell. Miquella's twin sister, Malenia, marched from the Mountaintops of the Giants and into Caelid to confront Radahn, seeking to kill him so Miquella could have his soul. The two of them fought to a draw, causing Malenia to resort to unleashing her curse of Scarlet Rot. Radahn was poisoned by Scarlet Rot so deeply that he lost his mind, and Caelid itself became a wasteland. Wanting to give their beloved leader an honorable death, Radahn's forces hold the "Radahn Festival" when stars have aligned, inviting warriors to slay their general and put him out of his misery.

Radahn can be slain by the Tarnished player character during the Radahn Festival with the potential assistance of various other NPCs, and his Great Rune claimed by the player. This immediately causes the stars to snap back into position, allowing fate to resume for Ranni the Witch, and results in a large meteor impact that unlocks an underground region.

In Shadow of the Erdtree, Radahn's soul travels to the Land of Shadow as planned by Miquella and is resurrected as Miquella's consort within a vessel made from the body of his step brother Mohg. Restored to his prime physical condition, Radahn again battles the Tarnished player with Miquella on his back, ending with the Tarnished slaying the God and his Lord consort.

== Development ==
During Radahn's second-phase meteor attack, Radahn pushes his horse Leonard underground as a protective measure. However, data mining revealed that Leonard also continues to track the player while underground, allowing Radahn to precisely target his meteor attack to hit the player. An easy trick discovered by players allowed them to instantly kill Radahn by standing adjacent to a cliff, causing Radahn to undershoot them and fall off the side of the arena when performing his meteor strike.

An update released in 2022 lowered the power of Radahn to make his first fight less challenging. However, the sheer degree of difficulty lowering was unintended, and a subsequent updates balanced it, but not all of his former power. In the DLC, data mining revealed Radahn had cut dialogue where he introduces himself during his boss battle.

In response to criticism to the visual clutter and hitbox problems of Radahn's second fight, an update released in 2024 lowered the power of Radahn to make his second fight less challenging.

The game's director, Hidetaka Miyazaki, stated that Radahn was his favorite boss, citing both Radahn as a person and the festive feeling of defeating him. He noted that he came up with the idea of the Radahn Festival, but the other developers did not take him seriously.

== Reception ==
Ian Walker of Kotaku called Radahn the game's best character, and potentially one of the greatest Souls characters of all time, citing both Radahn's "touching" and "awe-inspiring" backstory, as well as the way his battle changes the game's world. Saying that his current form is "a pale facsimile" of the brilliant general he formerly was, he called Radahn's reasoning for learning gravity magic - to continue riding his prized horse, Leonard - "adorable". While calling the normal Radahn fight "incredibly challenging", Walker suggested that players make use of the other characters available to be summoned for the fight, saying that it is not only thematically appropriate but makes the fight a "cakewalk". He also praised the fact that Radahn's defeat added a "permanent geological feature" to the game's map, allowing the player passage to the city of Nokron.

Describing Radahn as "everything I look for in a Souls boss", with "weird and heartbreaking" lore and a "unique experience" with a challenge that can be scaled by the player's choices, he called it "incredible that, 13 years after Demon’s Souls first released, FromSoftware can still create characters that have this much of an impact". Following the released of the Shadow of the Erdtee DLC, Radahn's importance to the overall game is emphasized, noting how much content is unlocked for defeating him in his first boss fight, such two endings of the main, being necessary to access the DLC, and various others examples.

James Troughton of TheGamer also praised the first Radahn fight, saying that few games had captured the excitement of adventurers banding together in a similar way as the Radahn Festival. Describing it as the game's "Dunharrow moment" in reference to The Lord of the Rings, he was surprised that the battle with Radahn was not the endgame, but rather only the game's midpoint. He called the fight "the sum of your journey up until this point", and the culmination of the player's journey through the "treacherous, inhospitable wasteland" of Caelid. Ben Brosofsky of Screen Rant found the ability to fight alongside NPCs to be "emotional" and awarding to defeat Radahn.

Radahn's second boss fight has received attention for its high level of difficulty. Both praised and criticized for his highly aggressive and relentless moveset, Radahn has been considered the strongest boss in the DLC, the whole game, or even in FromSoftware's history. "Let Me Solo Her", a player known for their expertise at fighting Malenia and for helping others against her, beat Radahn after three hours of attempts and began showcasing different tactics to help other players with the newer boss.

Like Malenia's boss fight, Radahn's second boss fight has been a source of unusual challenges. Twitch streamer DrDootPhD beat the boss using a saxophone in place of a controller, while others did so without sustaining any damage, or without dodging at all. Twitch.tv streamer MissMikkaa spent 52 tries and seven hours before successfully killing Radahn using a dance pad. One player used every status buff in the game to beat Radahn in one hit and another won while on Rune Level One without using Scadutree Fragments. YouTuber Lu Win Kre fought against Radahn solo and used a different weapon without taking damage each time, achieving this 40 times. YouTuber PointCrow's goldfish Tortellini managed to defeat Radahn using a camera that selects inputs based on which part of its tank it is in, receiving assistance from PointCrow.
