= Yuka Kitamura =

Japanese composer and violinist (born 1990)

Yuka Kitamura 北村 友香
- Born: April 27, 1990 (age 36); Hokkaido, Japan
- Occupations: Composer; violinist
- Years active: 2011–present
- Website: yuka-kitamura.com

Yuka Kitamura (Japanese: 北村 友香, Hepburn: Kitamura Yuka; born April 27, 1990) is a Japanese composer and violinist. Kitamura is best known for her compositions of the Japanese video game developer FromSoftware, most notably for Dark Souls III, Sekiro: Shadows Die Twice, and Elden Ring. She left FromSoftware in 2023 to pursue freelance work.

== Biography ==
Kitamura was born in Hokkaido, Japan. She has been interested in video games and music composition since her childhood, citing Majora's Mask as one of her favorite games and an influence for her professional ventures. After graduating from Sapporo Visual Arts College with a degree in music production, she began working at FromSoftware in 2011. There, she composed music for several of the studio’s successful games, including Bloodborne, Sekiro: Shadows Die Twice, and Elden Ring. She also took the place of Motoi Sakuraba as lead composer for Dark Souls III. Additionally, she was a member of FreQuency, a band composed of members of FromSoftware's sound team and led by Tsukasa Saitoh. In August 2023, she announced that she was leaving FromSoftware and would be working as a freelancer from then on. Since then, she has composed for the upcoming Touhou Project spin-off game The Touhou Empires, and the anime series Witch Hat Atelier.

== Musical style ==
Kitamura is noted for not only composing her music, but occasionally performing individual parts. In addition to performing as a vocalist, she plays both violin and cello, and has performed with all three in some of her compositions. She frequently combines sampled sounds and live performances in her music, mixing between the two to create her works.

Her compositions are characterized by their oppressive and suspenseful nature, which underscores the often unsettling and violent scenes in FromSoftware’s games. The radio station NTS Radio noted that her music has accompanied the virtual deaths of millions of players. The gaming website Gamekult stated that she excels in the realm of dark fantasy characteristic of Hidetaka Miyazaki’s games.

== Works ==
=== Video games ===
Year	Title	Notes
2013	Armored Core: Verdict Day	Music with Kota Hoshino
2014	Dark Souls II	Music with Motoi Sakuraba
2014	Dark Souls II: The Lost Crowns	Music with Motoi Sakuraba
2015	Bloodborne	"Watchers", "Rom, the Vacuous Spider", "Ebrietas, Daughter of the Cosmos"
2015	Bloodborne: The Old Hunters	"Lady Maria of the Astral Clocktower"
2016	Dark Souls III	Music with Motoi Sakuraba
2016	Dark Souls III: Ashes of Ariandel	Music with Motoi Sakuraba
2017	Dark Souls III: The Ringed City	Music with Motoi Sakuraba
2018	Déraciné	Music with Tsukasa Saitoh and Shoi Miyazawa
2018	Disaster Report 4 Plus: Summer Memories	Music
2019	Sekiro: Shadows Die Twice	Music
2022	Elden Ring	Music with Tsukasa Saitoh, Shoi Miyazawa, Tai Tomisawa, and Yoshimi Kudo
2024	Arknights	"Ratio Ultima", "Succession", "Cries of the Cinderbringer"
2024	Elden Ring Shadow of the Erdtree	"Gravesite Plain", "Gravesite Plain at Night", "Abyssal Woods", "St. Trina"
2025	Elden Ring Nightreign	"Spirit Shelter"
TBA	The Touhou Empires	Music

=== Film and television ===
Year	Title	Notes
2019	Shibuya Shadou	Short film
2025	The Betrayal	Short film
2025	Witch Hat Atelier	Anime

== Awards and nominations ==
- The Game Awards 2022: Best Music for Elden Ring
- British Academy Games Awards 2023: Best Music for Elden Ring
- Game Developers Choice Awards 2023: Best Audio for Elden Ring
