= Dark Souls III: The Ringed City =

2017 video game

- Developer: FromSoftware
- Publisher: Bandai Namco Entertainment
- Directors: Hidetaka Miyazaki; Isamu Okano; Yui Tanimura
- Composer: Yuka Kitamura
- Series: Dark Souls
- Platforms: Windows; PlayStation 4; Xbox One
- Release: March 27, 2017
- Genre: Action role-playing

Dark Souls III: The Ringed City is the second and last of the two downloadable content (DLC) packs for the 2016 action role-playing video game Dark Souls III. Released on March 27, 2017, the content pack was developed by FromSoftware and published by Bandai Namco Entertainment. It drew favorable reception from critics, with several seeing it as a fitting end to the Dark Souls series.

== Background ==
Unlike previous games in the Dark Souls series, Dark Souls III was launched alongside a season pass, confirming that two downloadable content packs were planned from the beginning. On January 3, 2017, Dark Souls III: The Ringed City was announced. The Ringed City and the preceding content pack, Ashes of Ariandel, were conceived as the final entries in the series.

== Plot ==
Hidetaka Miyazaki, director of Dark Souls III and creator of the Dark Souls series, said that the story of the two Dark Souls III packs was intended to cover the primary themes of the main game from a new perspective rather than wrap up the series at large. The pack sees the player pursuing a character known as Slave Knight Gael to the end of the world while he hunts for the titular "Dark Soul of Humanity".

=== Summary ===
Following The Ashen One's victory over the Soul of Cinder and Sister Friede, they arrive at the Dreg Heap, a land of ruins and ashes consisting of thousands of years of history smashed together. The Ashen One makes their way through numerous dangers, such as Lothric knights, Murkmen and angels, arriving at the Earthen Peak Ruins. Inside the ruins, they kill the Demon in Pain & Demon from Below, who become the Demon Prince. Upon victory, the Ashen One is transported to the Ringed City by winged demons.

The Ashen One travels across the city, where they meet various inhabitants - some still loyal to Gwyn, the Lord of Sunlight, and some who worship the Abyss and preach of the coming Age of Dark. Notably present is the dragon Darkeater Midir, who is slowly corrupted by the darkness he has consumed in his duty given by the long absent Lords. The player is implored by one of Gwyn's few remaining servants, Shira, Knight of Filianore, to put down Midir before the darkness within him destroys what is left of his sanity, and he can no longer tell friend from foe. Shira further implores the Ashen One not to disturb the slumber of Princess Filianore, as her sleep protects the city from the dangers of the Dark. Also stationed in the city is the warrior Halflight, one of the Spears of the Church who protects Gwyn's last daughter, Filianore, in her slumber.

Upon defeating Halflight and entering the Church of Filianore within the higher reaches of the Ringed City, the Ashen One finds Filianore herself, slumbering beside a mysterious egg. Upon touching the cracked egg held in her lap, in which is contained a Soul Forge similar to that used to transpose Great Souls, she is awakened, and the Ashen One is transported to a mysterious location similar to the one seen in the game's opening cinematic - an endless, lifeless desert that resembles the Ringed City, only long abandoned. At the thrones of the Pygmy Lords, the Ashen One encounters Slave Knight Gael, apparently slaughtering the Ringed City's rulers, the Pygmy Lords, and collecting their fractured, desiccated souls into The Dark Soul. Having gone mad due to the power of the Dark Soul, Gael challenges The Ashen One, prompting them to 'hand over' their soul. The player faces him, killing him and claiming the Dark Soul for their own. The Ashen One then returns to the painting of Ariandel and gives the Dark Soul to the Painting Woman to finish her vision of a new Painted World, offering to name it after the player. If they decline, she will instead name it 'Ash.'

== Setting and gameplay ==
Dark Souls III: The Ringed City features two primary locations: the Dreg Heap and the eponymous Ringed City. The former is a burnt-out, ash-smothered sprawl of castle and cathedral wreckage comprising the smashed constructs of different ages. The Dreg Heap is a grey, charred confluence of ruined civilizations, slowly sliding, crumbling, and decaying. The area's design is uncommon for the Dark Souls series, focusing on vertical navigation and avoiding long-ranged enemy hazards that incentivize a restrained, cautious pace for the player. Some critics praised the employment of these angelic enemies that require exploration to defeat, while others judged the game unfit for such an inclusion.

The Ringed City is the more expansive of the two locations, with three of the pack's four bosses dwelling within. Partially encircled by a ring-shaped wall of rock, the city is a bright area with shimmering domes, low gardens, massive buildings, and a vast purple swamp dotted with sinking structures. Julie Muncy of Wired called the Ringed City "beautiful, strange, and mysterious" and wrote, "I've never been anywhere quite like this before". The first required boss in the city comes in the form of an enemy that is sometimes randomly replaced by a player seeking PvP combat. Some critics saw this as a positive move to increase player versus player activity and heighten the pack's longevity, while others thought it was a "throwaway" confrontation that felt "out of place". The final fight of The Ringed City is against a character named Gael, who was introduced in the previous content pack.

== Reception ==
Reception

Aggregate score
Aggregator	Score
Metacritic	PC: 82/100; PS4: 82/100; XONE: 85/100

Review scores
Publication	Score
Destructoid	8.5/10
GameRevolution	4.5/5
GameSpot	8/10
IGN	8/10
PC Gamer (UK)	77/100
Push Square	8/10

Dark Souls III: The Ringed City received a "generally favorable" reception, according to review aggregator Metacritic. Several critics saw The Ringed City as a fitting end to the Dark Souls series. Writing for IGN, Chloi Rad said the pack has "found a way to revisit the past without a cheap reliance on nostalgia, wrapping up the story of Dark Souls in a way that will be satisfying for fans who enjoy digging into the rich lore the series has been building for the last few years." Daniel Starkey of GameSpot thought the pack ended too quickly but praised its locations, themes and enemies. Push Square's Ben Tarrant wrote, "It's a meaty installment and a welcome deviation from the practices seen in Ashes of Ariandel, while still interlocking with and continuing the complex narrative." Jeffrey Matulef of Eurogamer especially lauded the pack's boss fights, and Steven T. Wright of Rolling Stone appreciated its difficulty. In a more lukewarm review, James Davenport of PC Gamer wrote, "Gorgeous but empty, challenging but not always fair, The Ringed City is a weak reflection of the series' best traits." William Hughes of The A.V. Club called The Ringed City's locations beautiful and lush but thought the Souls formula was growing stale.
