= Ranni the Witch =

Fictional character from the video game Elden Ring

- Elden Ring character
- Ranni as depicted on the Miniature Ranni in Elden Ring
- First game: Elden Ring (2022)
- Created by: Hidetaka Miyazaki, George R.R. Martin
- Voiced by: Aimee-Ffion Edwards

In-universe information
- Alias: Renna
- Home: Ranni's Rise

Ranni the Witch (also known as Lunar Princess Ranni) is a character from the 2022 video game Elden Ring, and is voiced by Aimee-Ffion Edwards. A powerful witch, Empyrean, and supporting character inhabiting the body of a humanoid doll, and a major figure in the game's lore, she desires to remove the Elden Ring, this destiny symbolised by the moons. She is most notable for being the primary catalyst to the events of Elden Ring, and the instigator of one of the game's main quest lines, culminating in the architectural "Age of the Stars" ending in which the player character leaves as her royal consort. Specializing in frost-based sorcery, she is also able to create powerful magical projections, one of which the player fights after wounding her mother, Queen Rennala.

Ranni has a cold and commanding personality, but helps the player under the alias "Renna". She also feels affection towards her protector, Blaidd the Half-Wolf, and keeps him at her side despite the danger. The two have been noted as fan-favorite characters, and Ranni was praised by critics for her design and morally complex story.

== Characteristics ==
Ranni's true demigod appearance is unknown, as all the player sees of her is a charred corpse with seemingly red hair, similar to that of her siblings. Her original body bears a curse-mark indicating that she was killed by Destined Death. Her doll appearance has light-blue skin, medium-length hair, and even lighter, snow-colored clothing, with a large witch hat, a fur cloak, four arms, and a spectral second face alongside her own. One of her eyes is glowing blue, while the other remains tightly shut. Much of the doll's body beneath her clothing is constructed of tightly wound ropes, seen in a later appearance of the character.

== Appearances ==
Prior to the game's events, Ranni was born to champion Radagon and Queen Rennala of Liurnia, whose marriage prompted an integration of Liurnia into the Golden Order. However, after Radagon left Rennala without warning to become King Consort of Queen Marika the Eternal as the second Elden Lord, Rennala lost her mind, and her status as a champion.

Ranni plotted the Night of the Black Knives, in which Marika's son, the hero Godwyn the Golden, was killed by assassins wielding the stolen Rune of Death, also known as Destined Death, that Marika had removed from the Elden Ring. Godwyn was distorted into a undead Prince of Death, soulless and trapped in the state of death. Ranni used the other half of the stolen rune to kill her physical body and become immune to the influence of the Greater Will, binding her soul to a doll modeled after her mentor. Soon after, Marika shattered the Elden Ring, and a devastating war, the Shattering, ensued.

Ranni initially appears to the player as "Renna" at the Church of Elleh in Limgrave, implied to be the name of her former magical tutor, where she helps the player by giving them the Spirit-Calling Bell and Lone Wolf Ashes. After that, she disappears unless the player finds her at her hideout, Ranni's Rise, guarded by Royal Knight Loretta in Caria Manor. There, she introduces the player to Blaidd if they have not met before, as well as others in her employ, War Counselor Iji and Preceptor Seluvis.

The player must then defeat the demigod Starscourge Radahn to gain access to Nokron, the Eternal City, and obtain the Fingerslayer Blade, a weapon capable of slaying the Two Fingers, envoys of the Greater Will. Ranni can transfer herself into a miniature doll that can be picked up by the player, if she is talked to enough, she will respond in an embarrassed manner. Carrying her, the player fights through the underground Ainsel River and the Lake of Rot in order to reach the Moonlight Altar, where Ranni has slain her own Two Fingers. The player then gives her the Dark Moon Ring as her consort, she bestows the Dark Moon Greatsword in response, before disappearing until the game's ending.

A sidequest involving Ranni's loyal guardian, Blaidd the Half-Wolf, ties into her main quest. Blaidd was assigned to her at birth by the Two Fingers to keep Ranni in check. While the player initially helps Blaidd with various tasks, due to Ranni's defiance of the Two Fingers, Blaidd is doomed to go mad. The player can defeat him in battle for his equipment upon the completion of Ranni's quest.

In an optional quest, the player can attempt to ally with the treacherous Preceptor Seluvis and betray Ranni by giving her an "Amber Draught" to transform her into Seluvis's puppet. However, attempting this will fail, causing Ranni to kill both the player and Seluvis for their insolence and leave, and forcing the player to absolve their sins to gain her forgiveness.

The player may choose to summon Ranni immediately prior to the ending, prompting the Elden Ring's removal from the universe by Ranni and the start of the Age of Stars. With this, life is free from external interference and the concept of godhood brought by the Elden Ring ceases to exist.

== Development ==
Ranni's name, amongst other demigods featured in the game, was rumored to have been inspired by the name of George R. R. Martin, with all of them starting with the letters of his initials, although the author later denied it as a coincidence. He did, however, state that the similar names of the demigods were due to his fondness for giving family members and close kin names that "have something in common". Ian Walker of Kotaku speculated that Ranni's character was inspired by the young witch Schierke from Berserk, a manga that has commonly influenced the works of Hidetaka Miyazaki. Despite noting that Ranni was vastly more powerful, her bond with Blaidd was noted as being similar to Schierke's ability to calm Guts when he is wearing the wolf-like Berserker Armor, which Blaidd's howling pose had referenced in one of the game's trailers.

== Reception ==
A Famitsu survey resulted in Ranni as the character who left the strongest impression on players, with her guardian Blaidd also ranking third beneath Iron Fist Alexander. PC Gamer noted that more players achieved the Age of Stars ending than the game's default Elden Lord ending, despite it being harder to unlock. Specifically, an infographic released by Bandai Namco revealed that 11.7 million players obtained the Dark Moon Greatsword, the reward for completing Ranni's questline.

Hirun Cryer of VG247 argued that Ranni was the true protagonist of Elden Ring, rather than the player, calling the Tarnished "merely an accomplice" in her plans. Calling Ranni a "hero" despite her "self-serving" mission, he noted that her abandonment of Blaidd could be construed as personal sacrifice rather than a cruel move, and that she is ultimately putting the needs of others before her own, due to her belief that gods should not interfere in the lives of mortals.

Julianna Swickard of CBR also debated whether Ranni was good or evil, arriving at the conclusion that while she was morally grey as a character, her ending was the "best possible outcome" of all the game's endings. Praising her character design as "gorgeously magical", she nevertheless stated that as a character, Ranni had a clear evil streak as the catalyst for the Shattering. Calling Ranni's choices "drastic", she noted that players' opinions may differ on whether they were justified.

Fletcher Varnson of Screen Rant criticized a mistranslation in the game as mischaracterizing Ranni, causing her to appear more malevolent in English than in Japanese. Specifically mentioning the dialog in the Age of Stars ending as suggesting that Ranni would separate people's souls and emotions from their bodies, causing people to "hardly be people", he cites a more direct translation as showing that Ranni, instead, wished to separate them from the Greater Will, and keep away the "chill night" rather than embrace it. Therefore, he concluded that Ranni's goals were more clearly benevolent than the game depicted in its English version.

Hirun Cryer of GamesRadar+ called Ranni and her quest line some of the best things about Elden Ring, characterizing it as a "twisting journey [...] through a very different lens". CJ Wheeler of Rock Paper Shotgun compared Ranni's design to Gandalf due to her "rather large" hat.

In 2023, YouTuber VaatiVidya was noted by PC Gamer as having created a fan animation, An Elden Ring Movie: Age of the Stars, depicting a more linear illustrated narrative of Ranni and Blaidd's backstory based on collected in-game lore.
