= Elden Ring =

2022 video game

- Developer: FromSoftware
- Publisher: Bandai Namco Entertainment: JP: FromSoftware
- Directors: Hidetaka Miyazaki; Yui Tanimura
- Producer: Yuzo Kojima
- Designers: Yosuke Kayugawa; Ryu Matsumoto
- Programmers: Takeshi Suzuki; Yuki Kido
- Artists: Hidenori Sato; Ryo Fujimaki
- Writers: George R. R. Martin; Hidetaka Miyazaki
- Composers: Tsukasa Saitoh; Shoi Miyazawa; Tai Tomisawa; Yuka Kitamura; Yoshimi Kudo; Soma Tanizaki (Note: Shadow of the Erdtree only)
- Platforms: PlayStation 4; PlayStation 5; Windows; Xbox One; Xbox Series X/S; Nintendo Switch 2
- Release: PS4, PS5, Windows, Xbox One, Series X/S; February 25, 2022; Nintendo Switch 2; August 28, 2026
- Genre: Action role-playing
- Modes: Single-player, multiplayer

Elden Ring (Note: Japanese: エルデンリング, Hepburn: Eruden Ringu) is a 2022 action role-playing game developed by FromSoftware and published by Bandai Namco Entertainment. It was directed by Hidetaka Miyazaki and Yui Tanimura, with worldbuilding by the fantasy writer George R. R. Martin. It was released for PlayStation 4, PlayStation 5, Windows, Xbox One, and Xbox Series X/S on February 25, 2022, and for Nintendo Switch 2 on August 28, 2026. Players control a customizable character on a quest across the Lands Between to repair the Elden Ring and become the new Elden Lord.

Players explore the open world and its dungeons from a third-person perspective, traveling on foot or on the steed Torrent. Combat incorporates melee and ranged weapons, magic, and stealth, while players customize their character's attributes and equipment. They can summon spirits to assist them, cooperate with other players online, or engage in player versus player combat.

Development began in 2017. FromSoftware sought to adapt the gameplay of Dark Souls to an open world, giving players greater freedom of exploration. Martin developed the world's backstory, while Miyazaki led the writing of the main narrative. The developers retained an indirect approach to storytelling, encouraging players to interpret the story through item descriptions and optional dialogue.

Elden Ring received critical acclaim, particularly for its open world and exploration, although the Windows version's performance at launch drew criticism. It won Game of the Year awards at The Game Awards, the D.I.C.E. Awards, and the Game Developers Choice Awards, and has been cited as one of the greatest games of all time. Worldwide shipments and digital sales exceeded 30 million copies by March 2025, making it one of the best-selling games of all time. The expansion Shadow of the Erdtree was released in June 2024 to similar acclaim. A multiplayer-focused spinoff, Elden Ring Nightreign, was released in May 2025, and a film adaptation is scheduled for 2028.

== Gameplay ==
The player fighting a dragon while riding their steed Torrent

Elden Ring is an action role-playing game set in third-person perspective. It includes elements that are similar to those in other FromSoftware-developed games, such as the Dark Souls series, Bloodborne, and Sekiro: Shadows Die Twice. The game is set in an open world; players can freely explore the Lands Between and its six main areas, which include Limgrave—an area of grassy plains and ancient ruins—and Caelid, a wasteland home to undead monsters. The open world is explored using the character's mount Torrent as the main mode of transportation, though players may use fast travel outside combat. Throughout the game, players encounter non-player characters (NPCs) and enemies, including demigods who rule each main area and serve as the game's main bosses. Aside from the main areas, Elden Ring has hidden dungeons, including catacombs, tunnels, and caves where players can fight bosses and gather helpful items.

At the game's start, the player chooses a character class, which determines their starting spells, equipment, and attributes. Combat with enemies can be within melee, or from a distance using ranged weapons. Enemy attacks can be dodged, or blocked using shields. Spells allow players to enhance their weapons, fight enemies from afar, and restore lost hit points. The player can memorize a limited amount of these spells, which are cast using a staff or sacred seal item. Weapons are improved using Ashes of War, obtainable enchantments that grant new capabilities. Ashes of War can be applied to or removed from weapons, and each Ash adds a weapon art, a special ability used during combat. Aside from direct combat, stealth mechanics are used to avoid enemies or allow the targeting of foes with critical hits while hidden. Parrying attacks with weapons can also create opportunities for critical hits.

Checkpoints called Sites of Grace are located throughout the game; in these places, characters can increase the power of their attributes, change memorized spells, swap Ashes of War, or warp to using fast travel. Upon death, players respawn at the last Site of Grace they interacted with. Alternatively, they may choose to respawn at certain locations highlighted by "Stakes of Marika" provided they died nearby. To increase their attributes at Sites of Grace, the player must spend runes, an in-game currency that is acquired by defeating enemies. Runes are further used to buy items and improve weapons. Dying in Elden Ring causes the player to lose all collected runes at the location of death; if the player dies again before retrieving the runes, they will be lost forever.

Elden Ring contains crafting mechanics; the creation of items requires materials. Recipes, which are required for the crafting of items, can be found inside collectibles called cookbooks, which are scattered throughout the world. Materials are collected by defeating enemies, exploring the game's world, or by trading with merchant NPCs. Crafted items include poison darts, exploding pots, and consumables that temporarily increase the player's combat strength. Similar to the Dark Souls games, the player can summon friendly NPCs called spirits to fight enemies. Summoning each type of spirit requires its equivalent Spirit Ash; different types of Spirit Ashes can be discovered as the player explores the game world. Spirits can only be summoned near structures called Rebirth Monuments, which are primarily found in large areas and inside boss fight arenas.

Elden Ring has a multiplayer system that allows players to be summoned for both cooperative and player-versus-player (PvP) play over the Internet. Cooperative play involves the placing of a summon sign on the ground, which causes the sign to become visible to online players who have used a corresponding item. If another player interacts with the sign, the player who placed the sign is summoned into their world. Cooperative players remain in the same world until the boss of the area is defeated, the host of the world or the summoned player dies, or the summoned player is sent back to their home world by the host. In PvP combat, a summon sign is used to challenge another player to a duel, or the player can use additional items to invade the worlds of others. World hosts may use a "Taunter's Tongue" to increase the likelihood their world will be invaded by others, decrease the time between invasions, and increase the possible number of invaders.

== Synopsis ==
=== Premise ===
Elden Ring takes place in the Lands Between, a fictional landmass ruled over by several demigods. It was previously ruled over by the immortal Queen Marika, who acted as keeper of the Elden Ring, a powerful force that manifested as the physical concept of order. When Marika eventually shattered the Elden Ring and disappeared, her demigod children began warring over pieces of the Ring in an event called the Shattering. Each demigod possesses a shard of the Ring called a Great Rune, which corrupts them with power. In the game, the player character is a Tarnished, one of a group of exiles from the Lands Between who are summoned back after the Shattering. As one of the Tarnished, the player must traverse the realm to repair the Elden Ring and become the Elden Lord.

=== Plot ===
Early on in their journey to repair the Elden Ring, the Tarnished encounters a Maiden named Melina. As the Tarnished is Maidenless, Melina offers to act as their Maiden, granting them the ability to turn runes into strength, as well as giving the Tarnished her steed Torrent. She does this under the condition that the Tarnished brings her to the Erdtree, the home of the Elden Ring. Melina later takes the Tarnished to the Roundtable Hold, a gathering place for other Tarnished seeking to repair the Elden Ring. The Hold's benefactor, the Two Fingers, instructs the Tarnished to collect the Great Runes and bring them to the Erdtree, where they can be used to repair the Elden Ring.

The Tarnished journeys into the Lands Between, investigating its various locales and defeating the demigods. They soon recover enough Great Runes so that the Two Fingers allows them to battle Morgott the Grace-Given, the demigod guarding the Erdtree. As he dies, Morgott claims that the Erdtree will not allow anyone to enter it, making the Elden Ring irreparable. The Tarnished confirms this when they approach the Erdtree and find the interior blocked by a wall of thorns. Melina arrives and advises that they journey to find the Flame of Ruin, which they can use to set the Erdtree on fire and burn away the thorns. The Tarnished is then free to journey towards the Flame of Ruin, or can search for a way to harness the equally powerful Frenzied Flame.

Upon obtaining the Flame of Ruin, if the Tarnished did not gain the power of the Frenzied Flame, then Melina will take the Flame of Ruin and sacrifice herself to set the Erdtree on fire. If the Tarnished gained the power of the Frenzied Flame, then Melina will abandon the Tarnished, forcing them to use the Frenzied Flame to set the Erdtree on fire. Regardless, the Tarnished is transported to the ruined city of Farum Azula while the Erdtree burns. After defeating Maliketh the Black Blade and using his Rune of Death to fuel the fire, the Tarnished is returned to the foot of the scorched Erdtree. Inside, they fight Radagon, Marika's consort who had been inhabiting her body, as well as the guardian of the tree, the Elden Beast. After both are vanquished, the Tarnished gains access to Marika's shattered corpse, which contains the remains of the Elden Ring. Depending on the Tarnished's actions throughout the game, six different endings can then be achieved. These range from the Tarnished becoming the Elden Lord either alone or with the backing of one of several different characters, to allowing the Elden Ring to be destroyed by Ranni the Witch, or using the Frenzied Flame to destroy the Lands Between.

== Development and release ==
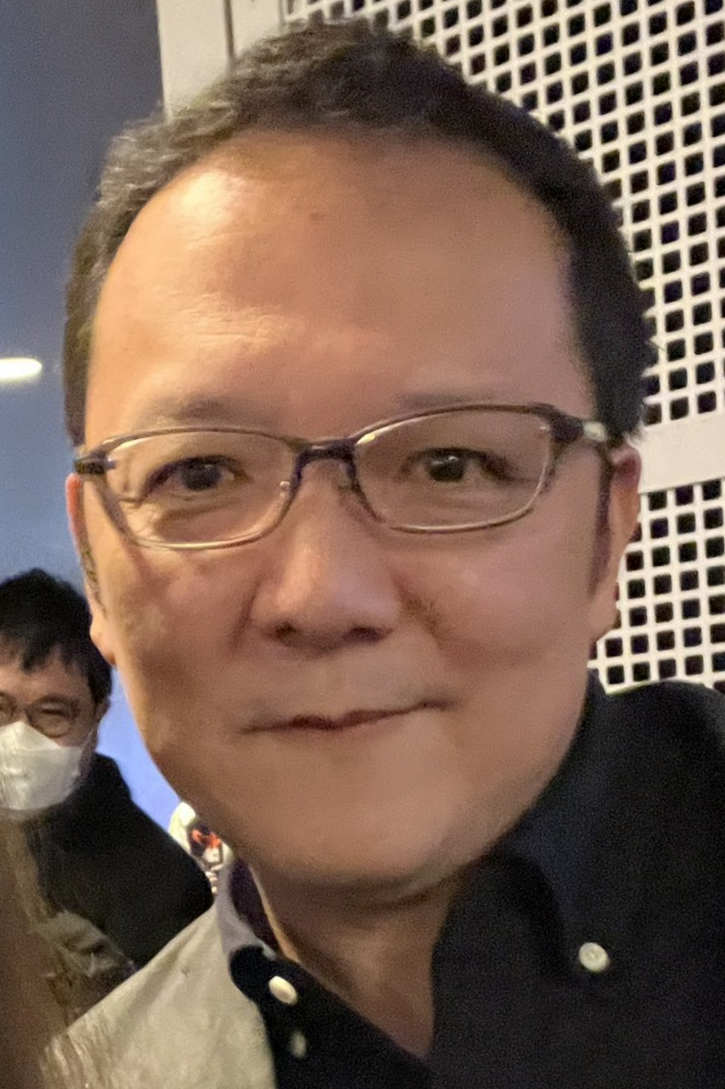
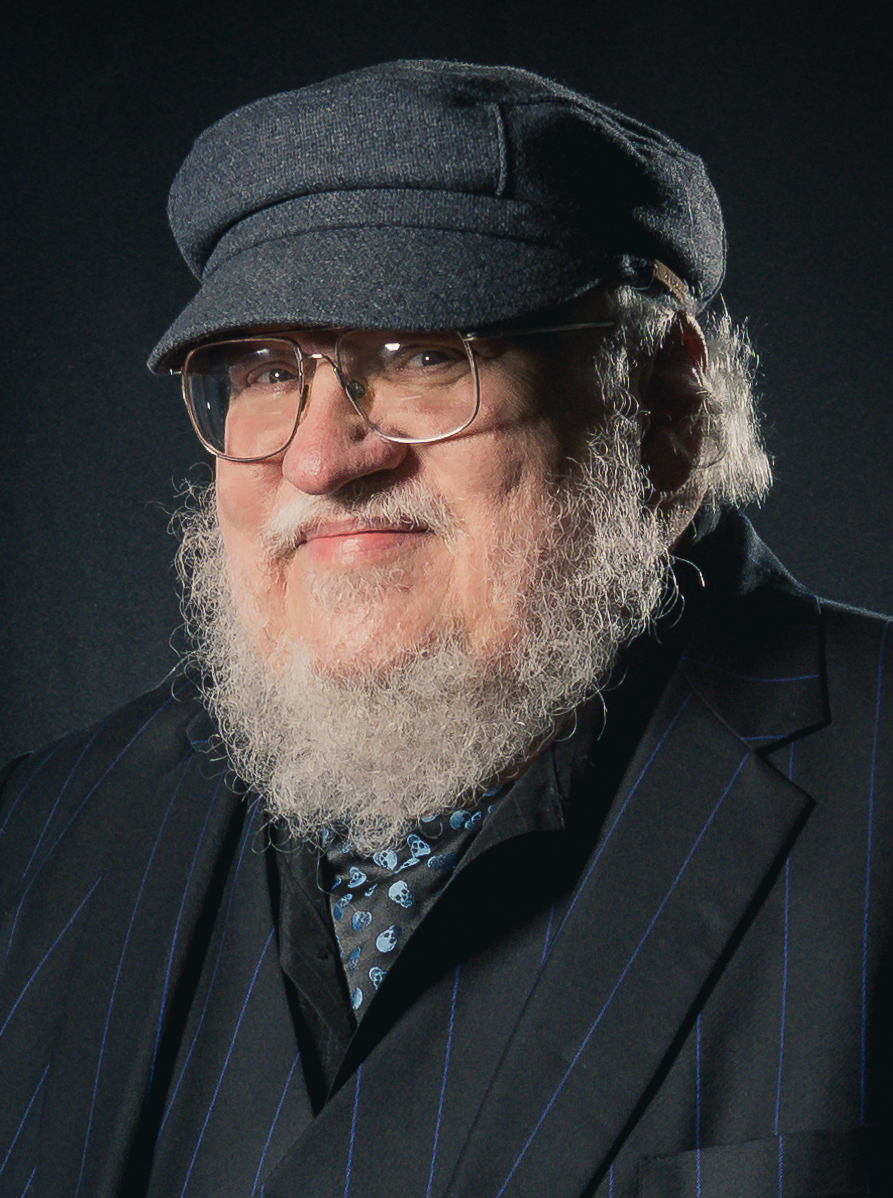
Elden Ring was directed by Hidetaka Miyazaki (top) with worldbuilding provided by fantasy writer George R. R. Martin (bottom).

FromSoftware's Dark Souls series of games is noted for its high level of difficulty. Director Hidetaka Miyazaki wanted to create an open-world game, intending Elden Ring as a mechanical evolution of Dark Souls. Elden Ring was designed to have a more-expansive environment than the narrow dungeons of FromSoftware's previous games; Miyazaki hoped the grander scale would add freedom and depth to exploration. FromSoftware approached American author George R. R. Martin, creator of the fantasy-novel series A Song of Ice and Fire, to provide worldbuilding for Elden Ring. Miyazaki, a fan of Martin's work, hoped his contributions would produce a more accessible narrative than those of the studio's earlier games.

Miyazaki remained lead writer for the game's main storyline but gave Martin creative freedom to write about events that occurred before the main narrative. Miyazaki compared the process to using a "dungeon master's handbook in a tabletop [role-playing game]". As with many of FromSoftware's previous games, the story was designed to be scantily explained; the developers wanted players to interpret the story for themselves via flavor text and optional discussions with non-player characters (NPCs). Miyazaki said he enjoyed writing NPCs with more detail, believing they are more compelling than those in his earlier works. In an interview with IGN, Miyazaki said he chose to give Martin control over the backstory because of the restrictions FromSoftware's method of storytelling placed on writers. He noted FromSoftware did not want a linear or story-focused game, and by giving Martin oversight of a backstory with which the player is not directly involved, he could allow Martin to freely design his contributions. Some staff from Game of Thrones, a television series adaptation of A Song of Ice and Fire, assisted with the game's development.

Production of the game began in early 2017 following the release of The Ringed City, a piece of downloadable content (DLC) for Dark Souls III. Elden Ring was developed alongside Sekiro: Shadows Die Twice, which Miyazaki also directed. He said although the combat in Elden Ring has similarities to that in Sekiro, neither game directly inspired the mechanics of the other. FromSoftware simultaneously developed both games using a "co-director" structure in which each of the games had a staff member acting as director through its first stages of development. Miyazaki would then provide direction on the game's mechanics, art, and music. Yui Tanimura, who previously directed Dark Souls II and co-directed Dark Souls III, served as co-director for the game. The design team of Elden Ring concentrated on environmental scale, role-playing, and storytelling as the main elements. FromSoftware chose not to populate the open world with large towns. Miyazaki said that the team instead concentrated on the types of environments it was most experienced in creating, representing former settlements as ruined, dungeon-like locations. Developers credited the scale with responsibility for creating a sense of diversity, and intended the roleplaying elements to allow for a variety of player-environment interactions. Increasing the game's scale required the creation of several explorable structures, which the team conjoined in the open world. Miyazaki named Shadow of the Colossus, The Elder Scrolls, The Witcher 3, and The Legend of Zelda: Breath of the Wild as design influences for Elden Ring. He credited the tabletop role-playing game RuneQuest, and the novels The Lord of the Rings and The Eternal Champion as inspirations for the game's story. Tsukasa Saitoh, Shoi Miyazawa, Tai Tomisawa, Yuka Kitamura, and Yoshimi Kudo composed Elden Ring's original score.

Elden Ring was revealed at E3 2019 in June. Some information about the game had previously been leaked online due to a vulnerability of the servers at Bandai Namco Entertainment. Elden Ring was widely anticipated on announcement but no further material was released until a trailer was shown in June 2021. Playtesting was facilitated by Bandai Namco, which in November 2021 initially released the game as a closed beta that players could sign up to test. The game's full release was scheduled for January 21, 2022, but was postponed to February 25 the same year. Elden Ring had performance issues at launch; players complained of an insufficient frame rate. Bandai Namco addressed some of these problems through software patches and updates.

In February 2023, the downloadable content (DLC) expansion Shadow of the Erdtree was announced. It was released on June 21, 2024. The expansion introduces the Realm of Shadow, where players follow Miquella, and adds new bosses, weapons, equipment, and abilities. It received "universal acclaim", according to review aggregator Metacritic. Jordan Middler of Video Games Chronicle praised its world design and visuals but found some NPC quests difficult to follow. By July 2025, worldwide shipments and digital sales had exceeded ten million copies, including bundles with the base game.

A Nintendo Switch 2 version of the game, Elden Ring Tarnished Edition, was released on August 28, 2026. Tarnished Edition includes both the base game and DLC expansion pack Shadow of the Erdtree, and features two new classes and cosmetics for Torrent. These features are also available on other platforms as paid DLC.

== Reception ==
Reception

Aggregate scores
Aggregator	Score
Metacritic	PC: 94/100; PS5: 96/100; XSXS: 96/100; NS2: 90/100
OpenCritic	98% recommend (Note: Based on 215 reviews)

Review scores
Publication	Score
Destructoid	10/10
Easy Allies	9.5/10
Famitsu	10/10, 10/10, 10/10, 9/10
Game Informer	10/10
GameRevolution	10/10
GameSpot	10/10
GamesRadar+	5/5
Hardcore Gamer	5/5
IGN	10/10
Nintendo Life	9/10
PC Gamer (US)	90/100
PCGamesN	10/10
Shacknews	9/10
The Guardian	5/5
VG247	5/5

Elden Ring received "universal acclaim" according to review aggregator website Metacritic. Fellow review aggregator OpenCritic assessed that the game received "mighty" approval, being recommended by 98% of critics. It has been cited as one of the best video games of all time.

The game's open-world setting received acclaim; reviewers praised the exploration mechanics. Tamoor Hussain of GameSpot praised the Lands Between as the most expansive of FromSoftware's settings, calling exploration and discovery the game's main appeal. Mitchell Saltzman of IGN lauded Elden Ring for rewarding exploration in every part of the map. Simon Parkin of The Guardian called the game's environments "intriguing and inventive". Some reviewers liked the open landscape's provision of opportunities to discover and try multiple challenges. The game's exploration drew many favorable comparisons with The Legend of Zelda: Breath of the Wild. The environments were also praised for their artistic designs; reviewers positively rated their execution in an open setting and appreciated the designs of linear dungeons.

Similarly to many of FromSoftware's earlier games, Elden Ring's difficulty provoked much commentary; reviewers both praised and criticized its lack of easy modes. Other reviewers considered Elden Ring the most-accessible Souls game, saying the player can choose to avoid difficult threats and return with more experience. The combat of Elden Ring was praised for offering options for fighting enemies while keeping the game challenging. Torrent and fast travel were well-received features, with reviewers citing them as large improvements towards making the game easier to explore. The placing of checkpoints was praised as helpful to the game's approachability.

Some reviewers criticized a number of the game's menu and accessibility systems. Reviewers complained about the poor performance of the Windows version; framerate issues were commonly mentioned. Reviewers noted the story of Elden Ring lacks Martin's writing style. Kyle Orland of Ars Technica said the game's storytelling is "characteristically sparse and cryptic", and differs from the expectations of Martin's fans. Chris Carter of Destructoid called the story "low key" but said it is better told than those of previous FromSoftware games. Aoife Wilson of Eurogamer said George R. R. Martin's heavy inclusion in the marketing was "baffling" when his contributions to the overall narrative were unclear. Mitchell Saltzman did not mind the lack of Martin's style, saying the side-stories rather than any grand, overarching plot kept him "enthralled".

Journalists have covered Elden Ring's speedrunning community. Shortly after release, players discovered a glitch called the "zip glitch" which allows players to warp across the map. The game has been beaten in under five minutes using the glitch.

=== Sales ===
Elden Ring sold 13.4 million copies worldwide by the end of March 2022. Worldwide shipments and digital sales exceeded 30 million copies by March 2025, making it one of the best-selling video games of all time. It was the best-selling game in several regions between February and March 2022, and is the fastest-selling Bandai Namco game of all time. It was the second-bestselling game of 2022 in the US after Call of Duty: Modern Warfare II and the third-bestselling in Europe. The PlayStation 4 version ranked tenth in Japan's physical software chart for 2022.

=== Awards ===
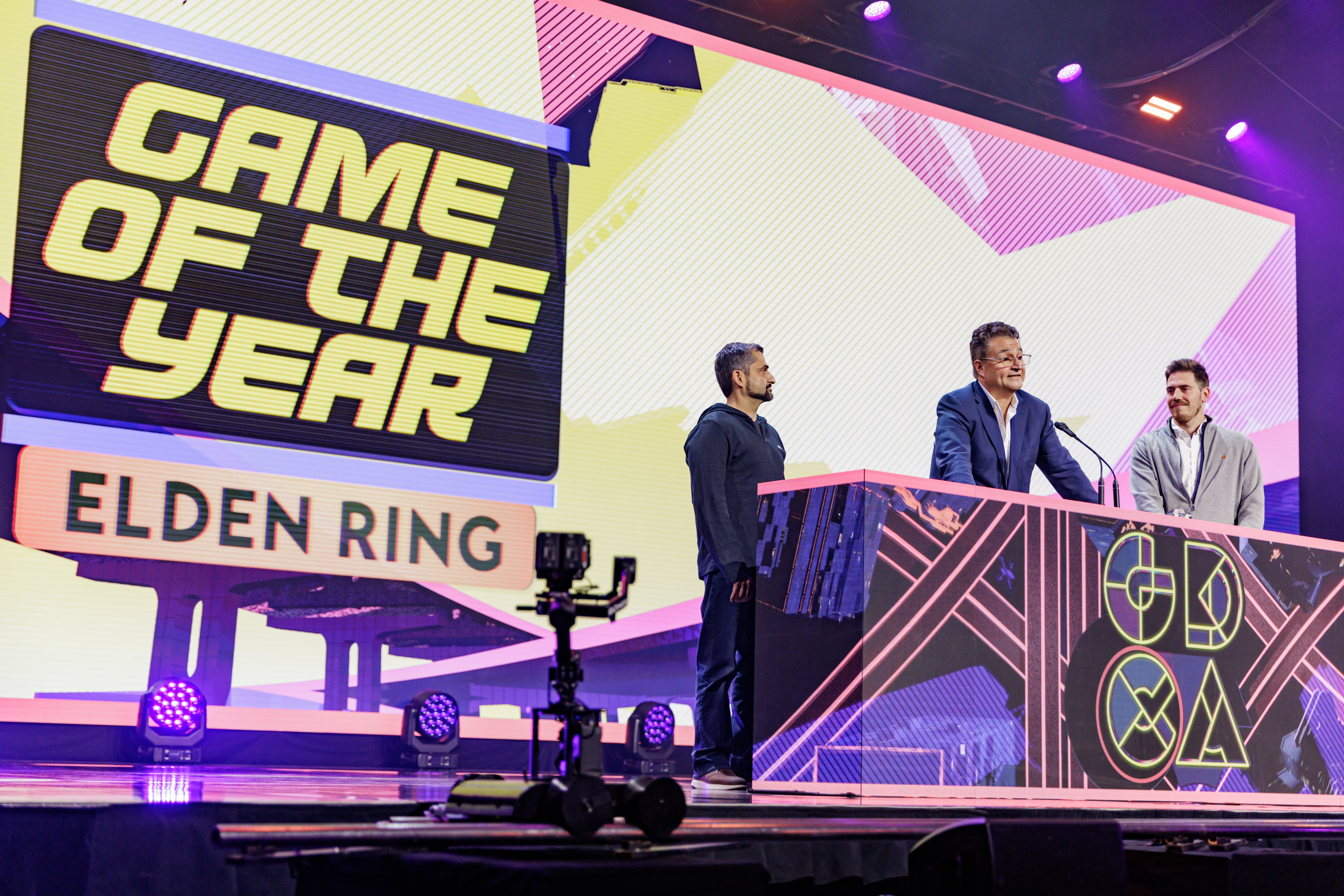
Elden Ring winning Game of the Year at the 23rd Game Developers Choice Awards

Elden Ring received over 300 Game of the Year awards, including by the publications Ars Technica, Destructoid, EGM, Eurogamer, Game Informer, GamesRadar+, GameSpot, IGN, PC Gamer, and Polygon.

Accolades received by Elden Ring
Award	Date	Category	Result	Ref.
British Academy Games Awards	March 30, 2023	Best Game	Nominated	
British Academy Games Awards	March 30, 2023	Artistic Achievement	Nominated	
British Academy Games Awards	March 30, 2023	Game Design	Nominated	
British Academy Games Awards	March 30, 2023	Multiplayer	Won	
British Academy Games Awards	March 30, 2023	Music	Nominated	
British Academy Games Awards	March 30, 2023	Original Property	Won	
British Academy Games Awards	March 30, 2023	Technical Achievement	Nominated	
British Academy Games Awards	March 30, 2023	EE Game of the Year	Nominated	
Deutscher Computerspielpreis	March 31, 2022	Best International Game	Won	
D.I.C.E. Awards	February 23, 2023	Game of the Year	Won	
D.I.C.E. Awards	February 23, 2023	Role-Playing Game of the Year	Won	
D.I.C.E. Awards	February 23, 2023	Outstanding Achievement in Game Direction	Won	
D.I.C.E. Awards	February 23, 2023	Outstanding Achievement in Game Design	Won	
D.I.C.E. Awards	February 23, 2023	Outstanding Achievement in Animation	Nominated	
D.I.C.E. Awards	February 23, 2023	Outstanding Achievement in Story	Nominated	
D.I.C.E. Awards	February 23, 2023	Outstanding Technical Achievement	Won	
D.I.C.E. Awards	February 13, 2025	Role-Playing Game of the Year (for Shadow of the Erdtree)	Nominated	
Dragon Awards	September 5, 2022	Best Science Fiction or Fantasy PC / Console Game	Won	
Dragon Awards	September 2, 2024	Best Digital Game (for Shadow of the Erdtree)	Nominated	
Famitsu Dengeki Game Awards	March 18, 2023	Game of the Year	Won	
Famitsu Dengeki Game Awards	March 18, 2023	Best Graphics	Won	
Famitsu Dengeki Game Awards	March 18, 2023	Best RPG	Nominated	
Famitsu Dengeki Game Awards	March 18, 2023	Best Rookie Game	Nominated	
Game Audio Network Guild Awards	March 23, 2023	Best Main Theme	Nominated	
The Game Awards	December 10, 2020	Most Anticipated Game	Won	
The Game Awards	December 9, 2021	Most Anticipated Game	Won	
The Game Awards	December 8, 2022	Game of the Year	Won	
The Game Awards	December 8, 2022	Best Game Direction	Won	
The Game Awards	December 8, 2022	Best Narrative	Nominated	
The Game Awards	December 8, 2022	Best Art Direction	Won	
The Game Awards	December 8, 2022	Best Score and Music	Nominated	
The Game Awards	December 8, 2022	Best Audio Design	Nominated	
The Game Awards	December 8, 2022	Best Role Playing Game	Won	
The Game Awards	December 8, 2022	Players' Voice	Nominated	
The Game Awards	December 12, 2024	Game of the Year (for Shadow of the Erdtree)	Nominated	
The Game Awards	December 12, 2024	Best Game Direction (for Shadow of the Erdtree)	Nominated	
The Game Awards	December 12, 2024	Best Art Direction (for Shadow of the Erdtree)	Nominated	
The Game Awards	December 12, 2024	Best Role Playing Game (for Shadow of the Erdtree)	Nominated	
The Game Awards	December 12, 2024	Players' Voice (for Shadow of the Erdtree)	Nominated	
Game Developers Choice Awards	March 22, 2023	Game of the Year	Won	
Game Developers Choice Awards	March 22, 2023	Best Audio	Nominated	
Game Developers Choice Awards	March 22, 2023	Best Design	Won	
Game Developers Choice Awards	March 22, 2023	Innovation Award	Nominated	
Game Developers Choice Awards	March 22, 2023	Best Technology	Nominated	
Game Developers Choice Awards	March 22, 2023	Best Visual Art	Won	
Gamescom	August 27, 2021	Best of Gamescom	Won	
Gamescom	August 27, 2021	Most Wanted	Won	
Gamescom	August 27, 2021	Best Microsoft Xbox Game	Nominated	
Gamescom	August 27, 2021	Best PC Game	Nominated	
Gamescom	August 27, 2021	Best Sony PlayStation Game	Won	
Gamescom	August 27, 2021	Best Action Adventure Game	Won	
Gamescom	August 27, 2021	Best Role Playing Game	Won	
Gayming Awards	April 24, 2023	Game of the Year	Nominated	
Gayming Awards	April 24, 2023	Gayming Magazine Readers' Award	Nominated	
GEM Awards	April 25, 2025	Best Original Score (for Shadow of the Erdtree)	Won	
GEM Awards	April 25, 2025	Best DLC/Expansion (for Shadow of the Erdtree)	Won	
Golden Joystick Awards	November 24, 2020	Most Wanted Game	Nominated	
Golden Joystick Awards	November 23, 2021	Most Wanted Game	Won	
Golden Joystick Awards	November 22, 2022	Ultimate Game of the Year	Won	
Golden Joystick Awards	November 22, 2022	PlayStation Game of the Year	Nominated	
Golden Joystick Awards	November 22, 2022	Best Visual Design	Won	
Golden Joystick Awards	November 22, 2022	Best Multiplayer Game	Won	
Golden Joystick Awards	November 22, 2022	Critics' Choice Award	Won	
Golden Joystick Awards	November 21, 2024	Best Game Expansion (for Shadow of the Erdtree)	Won	
Golden Trailer Awards	October 6, 2022	Best Video Game Trailer (for "Ming Na Wen")	Nominated	
Japan Game Awards	September 15, 2022	Grand Award	Won	
Japan Game Awards	September 15, 2022	Award for Excellence	Won	
MTV Millennial Awards	July 10, 2022	Gamer Obsession	Nominated	
Nebula Awards	May 14, 2023	Best Game Writing	Won	
Nebula Awards	June 7, 2025	Best Game Writing (for Shadow of the Erdtree)	Nominated	
New York Game Awards	January 17, 2023	Big Apple Award for Best Game of the Year	Won	
New York Game Awards	January 17, 2023	Herman Melville Award for Best Writing in a Game	Nominated	
New York Game Awards	January 17, 2023	Statue of Liberty Award for Best World	Won	
New York Game Awards	January 17, 2023	Tin Pan Alley Award for Best Music in a Game	Nominated	
New York Game Awards	January 21, 2025	Statue of Liberty Award for Best World (for Shadow of the Erdtree)	Won	
New York Game Awards	January 21, 2025	NYC GWB Award for Best DLC (for Shadow of the Erdtree)	Won	
The Steam Awards	January 3, 2023	Game of the Year	Won	
The Steam Awards	January 3, 2023	Best Game You Suck At	Won	
The Steam Awards	December 31, 2024	Labor of Love	Won	
The Streamer Awards	March 11, 2023	Stream Game of the Year	Won	
The Streamer Awards	December 7, 2024	Stream Game of the Year	Nominated	
Titanium Awards	November 18, 2022	Game of the Year	Nominated	
Titanium Awards	November 18, 2022	Best Game Design	Won	
Titanium Awards	November 18, 2022	Best Art Direction	Nominated	
The Vtuber Awards	December 14, 2024	Stream Game of the Year	Nominated	

== Related media ==
=== Nightreign ===
Elden Ring Nightreign, a standalone spinoff set in the Elden Ring universe, was released on May 30, 2025. Developed by FromSoftware, it adapts elements of the original game into cooperative action survival gameplay. Players choose characters with distinct abilities and work together against enemies in an environment that changes between sessions.

=== Film adaptation ===
A live-action film adaptation of Elden Ring was announced in May 2025, to be produced by A24 and Bandai Namco. Alex Garland was chosen to direct and write the screenplay, while Peter Rice, Andrew Macdonald, Allon Reich, George R. R. Martin and Vince Gerardis will produce the film. The film is set to be released on March 3, 2028.
