= Elden Ring Shadow of the Erdtree =

2024 video game expansion pack

- Developer: FromSoftware
- Publisher: Bandai Namco Entertainment
- Director: Hidetaka Miyazaki
- Series: Elden Ring
- Platforms: PlayStation 4; PlayStation 5; Windows; Xbox One; Xbox Series X/S; Nintendo Switch 2
- Release: PS4, PS5, Windows, Xbox One, Series X/S; 21 June 2024; Nintendo Switch 2; 28 August 2026
- Genre: Action role-playing
- Modes: Single-player, multiplayer

Elden Ring Shadow of the Erdtree is a 2024 expansion pack for the 2022 action role-playing game Elden Ring. It was developed by FromSoftware and published by Bandai Namco Entertainment for PlayStation 4, PlayStation 5, Windows, Xbox One, and Xbox Series X/S. The expansion introduces a new setting, new gameplay mechanics, and focuses on undeveloped narrative elements in the base game. In Shadow of the Erdtree, the player character follows the trail of the demigod Miquella in the Land of Shadow, and must uncover the truth behind his disappearance.

Shadow of the Erdtree retains the open-world structure and combat systems of Elden Ring, while adding new varieties in the items, equipment, and magic systems. Director Hidetaka Miyazaki described it as the largest expansion FromSoftware had produced, and said it was intended to recapture the base game's sense of discovery.

The expansion received critical acclaim and sold ten million units by July 2025. It's been praised for its level design, combat additions, new enemies, and sense of exploration, which was compared favorably to the base game. However, reactions to its heavy difficulty were mixed. Its eligibility as a Game of the Year nomination for The Game Awards 2024 also caused controversy. The expansion pack was released alongside the base game for the Nintendo Switch 2 as Elden Ring Tarnished Edition in August 2026.

== Gameplay ==
Shadow of the Erdtree is an expansion to Elden Ring, an action role-playing game played from a third-person perspective. The expansion preserves the base game's exploration, character-building, combat, summoning, and boss encounter systems, but introduces a new region called the Realm of Shadow. Players access the expansion through the base game after defeating Starscourge Radahn and Mohg, Lord of Blood.

The expansion adds new weapons, armour, spells, enemies, dungeons, and bosses. It also introduces a separate power system for the Realm of Shadow. Scadutree Fragments improve the player character's attack and defence within the expansion area, while Revered Spirit Ashes strengthen spirit summons and the spectral steed Torrent there. Reviewers noted that the system encouraged players to explore the new region rather than relying only on their character level from the base game.

The Land of Shadow is structured as an interconnected world with open fields, legacy dungeons, smaller caves, forts, ruins, and optional boss encounters. GameSpot described the expansion as large enough to resemble a separate game, while Game Informer emphasised that its added systems and regions expanded the main campaign rather than functioning as a small side area.

== Synopsis ==
=== Premise ===
Shadow of the Erdtree is set in the Land of Shadow, a land separated from the Lands Between and obscured by the Erdtree. Many years prior to the events of the expansion, Marika's son Messmer was left abandoned in the land due to his malevolent nature, and over the years led a crusade against a faction known as the Hornsent. Among other demigods is Miquella, a demigod often mentioned in Elden Ring whose fate has been left unresolved, outside of his corpse seen kept in a cocoon. The player follows his traces through the Land of Shadow, encountering followers drawn to his path and confronting new enemies connected to the region's history. The expansion also develops the background of Queen Marika, the Golden Order, and the hidden history behind the base game's setting.

=== Plot ===
The Tarnished follows the trail of Miquella, one of Marika's demigod children, who was seemingly abducted by Mohg, the brother of Morgott the Grace-Given. After slaying the demigod Radahn and subsequently killing Mohg in his lair, they discover that Miquella's spirit abandoned his body to pass into an area called the Land of Shadow. Entering the realm through Miquella's corpse, the Tarnished continues to track him by locating abandoned aspects of him scattered throughout the land. Optionally, the Tarnished can interact with Miquella's followers, who pursued their master: Leda, one of Miquella's knights; Dane, a monk who silently serves Miquella; Freyja, a soldier of Radahn; Hornsent, a Land of Shadow native; Thiollier, a worshipper of Miquella's female alter-ego, St. Trina; Sir Ansbach, a former follower of Mohg; and Moore, an armored merchant infected with a disease called the Scarlet Rot.

Miquella's trail leads the Tarnished to the Gate of Divinity, but they find it locked behind magical thorns, forcing them to confront and kill Messmer to burn them away using his power. Upon nearing the Gate, they are confronted by Miquella's followers, who had turned on each other after his affection-compelling charm came undone, with the survivors dependent on the Tarnished's choices. Confronting Miquella, it is revealed that he orchestrated his own abduction as a means to enter the Land of Shadow, and later used Mohg's corpse to revive Radahn as his ally and consort. Miquella attempts a ritual to become a god, though the Tarnished duels and kills Miquella and Radahn, thwarting the rite.

== Development and release ==
Bandai Namco announced Shadow of the Erdtree on 28 February 2023, stating that an expansion for Elden Ring was in development. A gameplay reveal trailer and release date were published on 21 February 2024. The expansion was released worldwide on 21 June 2024 for PlayStation 4, PlayStation 5, Windows, Xbox One, and Xbox Series X and Series S. It was sold as a separate expansion requiring the base game, as part of bundled editions, and in a collector's edition.

Miyazaki said that Shadow of the Erdtree was the largest downloadable expansion FromSoftware had made. He compared its world size to Limgrave, the opening region of Elden Ring, while saying that the expansion was denser in content than that comparison suggested. He also said the decision to focus on Miquella was partly intended to develop unresolved parts of the mythology created for Elden Ring, including material connected to George R. R. Martin's contribution to the setting. In an interview with The Guardian, Miyazaki described the expansion as the end of Elden Ring's story, while not ruling out the possibility of returning to the world in another form.

Before release, Miyazaki said that Shadow of the Erdtree was intended as the first and last downloadable expansion for Elden Ring. After release, FromSoftware adjusted the expansion's Scadutree Blessing system through a calibration update, increasing the effect of blessings during the earlier part of the progression curve and slightly improving later scaling.

== Reception ==
Elden Ring Shadow of the Erdtree

Aggregate score
Aggregator	Score
Metacritic	PS5: 94/100; Windows: 92/100; XSXS: 95/100

Review scores
Publication	Score
Game Informer	9.75/10
GameSpot	10/10
IGN	10/10
PC Gamer (US)	95/100

Shadow of the Erdtree received "universal acclaim" from critics, according to review aggregator website Metacritic. The PlayStation 5 version received a weighted average score of 94 out of 100 based on 64 critic reviews, while the Windows and Xbox Series X versions received scores of 92 and 95, respectively.

Critics praised the expansion's scale, world design, level design, combat additions, enemy variety, and sense of exploration. Tamoor Hussain of GameSpot awarded it 10 out of 10, describing it as an expansion with enough content to resemble a full game and praising its setting, combat options, and additions to the lore of Elden Ring. Marcus Stewart of Game Informer awarded it 9.75 out of 10, praising the Realm of Shadow, the new dungeons, bosses, weapons, and Scadutree progression system. Mitchell Saltzman of IGN awarded it 10 out of 10 and considered it a strong final expansion for Elden Ring. Tyler Colp of PC Gamer gave it 95 out of 100, praising its world, battles, set pieces, and storytelling.

Several reviewers emphasised that the expansion restored the uncertainty and danger of first playing the base game. The Verge focused on how the Realm of Shadow forced experienced players to reassess their habits and approach the game with caution. Kotaku described the expansion as large and dense enough to function as a standalone title, while also noting that its map could be difficult to read because of the vertical structure of the new region. Reviewers also discussed the expansion's demanding boss encounters and progression system, generally treating its difficulty as a central part of its design rather than only a barrier to completion.

At release, the game temporarily received mixed player reviews on steam, with the difficulty being a point of debate. Criticism included the Scadutree Fragment system and the Promised Consort Radahn boss fight; both were later addressed in a later update. Automaton West similarly connected the update to early player criticism of the expansion's difficulty and the initial mixed user response on Steam.

Miyazaki addressed difficulty in interviews around the expansion's release. He told The Verge that the studio had tuned Shadow of the Erdtree in response to lessons learned from the base game, while maintaining FromSoftware's emphasis on challenge. In The Guardian, he said that lowering difficulty would undermine the experience the studio was trying to create.

=== Sales ===
Bandai Namco announced that Shadow of the Erdtree sold five million units worldwide within three days of release. By July 2025, the company announced that the expansion had surpassed ten million units worldwide. Following the ten million milestone, GamesRadar+ described the expansion as having one of the highest attach rates in downloadable content history, comparing its commercial performance with major expansions for The Witcher 3: Wild Hunt and Cyberpunk 2077.

=== Accolades ===
Shadow of the Erdtree won Best Game Expansion at the 2024 Golden Joystick Awards. It was also nominated for Game of the Year at The Game Awards 2024, after the awards organisers clarified that expansions, downloadable content, remakes, remasters, and seasonal content were eligible for all categories. The nomination drew attention because Shadow of the Erdtree was an expansion to an existing game rather than a standalone release.

Award	Date	Category	Recipient(s)	Result	Ref.
Golden Joystick Awards	21 November 2024	Best Game Expansion	Elden Ring Shadow of the Erdtree	Won	
The Game Awards	12 December 2024	Game of the Year	Elden Ring Shadow of the Erdtree	Nominated	
The Game Awards	12 December 2024	Best Game Direction	Elden Ring Shadow of the Erdtree	Nominated	
The Game Awards	12 December 2024	Best Art Direction	Elden Ring Shadow of the Erdtree	Nominated	
The Game Awards	12 December 2024	Best Role Playing Game	Elden Ring Shadow of the Erdtree	Nominated	
The Game Awards	12 December 2024	Players' Voice	Elden Ring Shadow of the Erdtree	Nominated	
New York Game Awards	21 January 2025	Statue of Liberty Award for Best World	Elden Ring Shadow of the Erdtree	Won	
New York Game Awards	21 January 2025	NYC GWB Award for Best DLC	Elden Ring Shadow of the Erdtree	Won	
D.I.C.E. Awards	13 February 2025	Role-Playing Game of the Year	Elden Ring Shadow of the Erdtree	Nominated	
Nebula Awards	2025	Best Game Writing	Hidetaka Miyazaki	Nominated	
