= Echo Night =

Video game series

- Genres: Adventure, survival horror
- Developer: FromSoftware
- Publishers: JP: FromSoftware; NA: Agetec; EU: Indie Games Productions Nobilis
- Creator: Toshifumi Nabeshima
- Platforms: PlayStation, PlayStation Portable, PlayStation 2
- First release: Echo Night; August 13, 1998
- Latest release: Echo Night: The First Voyage; June 30, 2005

Echo Night (Note: Ekō Naito (Japanese: エコー ナイト)) is a trilogy of Japanese adventure games developed by FromSoftware. The original Echo Night was first released in 1998 for the PlayStation. Two sequels were developed: Echo Night 2: The Lord of Nightmares for the PlayStation in Japan in 1999, and Echo Night: Beyond for the PlayStation 2 which was released worldwide between 2004 and 2005. All the titles feature a protagonist called Richard Osmond pursuing a magical artifact and interacting with ghosts. Titles are played from a first-person perspective, and place a focus on puzzles and exploration.

The original Echo Night began as an experimental title based on the realistic graphics created for King's Field III. The second game was created around a theme of "quiet horror". Echo Night Beyond was developed by a staff of around 70 people. All three titles were produced by series creator Toshifumi Nabeshima. The series has generally met with mixed reception, and has remained obscure. Echo Night later inspired Hidetaka Miyazaki while developing Déraciné for the PlayStation VR.

== Titles ==
- Echo Night is the debut entry, releasing for the PlayStation in 1998 in Japan. It was released in North America by Agetec in 1999.
- Echo Night 2: The Lord of Nightmares, (Note: Ekō Naito Tsū: Nemuri no Shihaisha (エコーナイト#2 眠りの支配者)) the second entry in the series, was released for the PlayStation in 1999 in Japan. It saw a reissue in 2001, and a PSN release in 2007. The title is exclusive to Japan.
- Echo Night: Beyond, (Note: Known in Japan as Nebula -Echo Night- (ネビュラ -エコーナイト-, Nebyura -Ekō Naito-)) the third and to-date final entry, was released for the PlayStation 2 (PS2) in Japan in 2004. It was published in North America by Agetec that same year. It was published in Europe in 2005 by Indie Game Productions and Nobilis.
- Echo Night: The First Voyage was released for the PlayStation Portable in 2005 included as part of FromSoftware's Adventure Player.

== Common elements ==
While the Echo Night trilogy share common elements, each game takes place in its own timeline. Three recurring elements within the series are the protagonist having the name Richard, the main gameplay and narrative element of interacting with ghosts, and the use of a magical artifact. This artifact is called the Red Stone in Echo Night and Echo Night: Beyond, and the Soul Stone in Echo Night 2.

The gameplay is generally the same across all entries, focusing on exploration of isolated locations and environments from a first-person perspective. During explorations, the player must solve puzzles to progress the narrative, with certain actions leading to different outcomes. A recurring enemy within the series are hostile ghosts, which attack the player under certain circumstances. Fending off ghosts with light is a recurring mechanic.

== Development ==
The Echo Night series was created by FromSoftware, a Japanese development studio which had begun game development for the PlayStation with the King's Field series. Taking inspiration from the realistic environments created for King's Field III, the development team wanted to create a non-standard gameplay experience using their knowledge of 3D graphics. Starting out as a pure experiment, it was later approved as a full title. The second game was built around a theme of "quiet horror". Several staff from Echo Night returned for the second game. Echo Night: Beyond was released in 2004 as part of FromSoftware's group of titles for the PS2. It was worked on by a staff of nearly seventy people. The producer for all the titles was series creator Toshifumi Nabeshima. FromSoftware president Hidetaka Miyazaki cited Echo Night as a direct inspiration for Déraciné, a 2018 virtual reality game.

== Reception ==
USGamer's Bob Mackey noted that the game was ahead of its time in its tone and gameplay, comparing it to later independent titles Gone Home and The Vanishing of Ethan Carter, citing it as an important precursor to such exploration-driven projects. In an article looking back at the original game, Game Informer highlighted the Echo Night series as one of many different notable series created by FromSoftware prior to the widespread popularity of the Dark Souls series. In a series dedicated to cult titles on the PS2, Kristan Reed of Eurogamer noted the series' obscurity while calling Beyond a worthwhile experience for those with patience due to its unique setting and pacing.
