= King's Field II =

King's Field II may refer to:

- King's Field (1995 video game), a video game released as King's Field II in Japan
- King's Field III, a video game released as King's Field II outside of Japan
