= King's Field (1994 video game) =

1994 action role-playing video game

- Developer: FromSoftware
- Publisher: FromSoftware
- Producer: Naotoshi Zin
- Programmer: Eiichi Hasegawa
- Artist: Sakumi Watanabe
- Writers: Toshiya Kimura; Shinichiro Nishida
- Composers: Koji Endo; Kaoru Kono
- Series: King's Field
- Platform: PlayStation
- Release: JP: December 16, 1994
- Genre: Action role-playing
- Mode: Single-player

King's Field (Note: Kingusu Fīrudo (キングスフィールド)) is a 1994 action role-playing game developed and published by FromSoftware for the PlayStation. It was FromSoftware's debut video game project after developing business software for eight years, as well as the first game in what would become the King's Field series; this first title was only released in Japan, with the follow-up, King's Field II (1995) releasing globally as simply King's Field. In the game, the player navigates a vast underground labyrinth to discover the source of an invasion of monsters. Attacking and using spells are tied to a stamina meter, which is depleted with each action and must refill before the player can act again.

The game was initially planned as a title for personal computers before shifting to the PlayStation, which they felt had better specs. It was developed in around six months by a small internal team. Upon release, the game was a commercial success, though receiving mixed reviews from critics. King's Field is one of the earliest known 3D console role-playing games, predating later more famous titles such as Final Fantasy VII. The game not only spawned multiple sequels, but would go on to inspire future FromSoftware games including Shadow Tower and the Dark Souls series.

== Gameplay ==
Gameplay in King's Field, showing an early section of the game

King's Field is an action role-playing video game played from a first-person perspective. Players navigate the dungeon's five environments, which are rendered using real-time 3D graphics. During exploration, the player finds keys and items which can open doors and activate portals to allow travel to different levels of the dungeon. Maps can also be discovered to help with navigation. Enemies are encountered in the dungeon environment, with battles taking place in real-time. Players can use a melee attack with their equipped weapon and a magic attack. Both melee and magic attacks drain dedicated stamina meters, with no further action possible until the meter has filled again. Different weapons and other items such as shields and armor can be either bought from non-playable characters (NPCs) or found in chests during dungeon exploration.

== Plot ==
The game takes place in the Medieval land of Verdite, which was once terrorised by evil powers. In ancient times the evil was defeated by a hero later dubbed the Dragon. After his victory, the Dragon disappeared and became known as a legend, with a cathedral built in his honor in the forests where his deeds took place. During the game's events, the land has fallen prey to evil forces once again, with the locals' only hope being a prophecy that the Dragon will return. The protagonist of King's Field, royal heir Jean Alfred Forester, comes to the infested monastery in search of his father, who led a squad of soldiers into the catacombs beneath the monastery graveyard. Fighting his way through the catacombs, Forester meets the elf Miria, who warns that Verdite's king Reinhardt III has gained a dark power. Descending deeper into the catacombs, Forester learns that Reinhardt II, who is Reinhardt III's father, poisoned his brother, Reandalf VIII, who has been resurrected by the dark power, and that his own father was killed defeating Reinhardt II's black knight guardian. Retrieving his father's hereditary Dragon Sword and killing the dark wizard creating the monsters, he again meets Miria and her master the dragon god Guyra, who grants him the power to kill Reinhardt III and seal the "door of darkness", a portal opened by the cursed line of Reinhardt so they could rule the world. Forester confronts and kills a demonically-transformed Reinhardt III. Hailed as a hero, Forester is made the new king.

== Development and release ==
King's Field was the first video game title developed by FromSoftware, which was founded in the 1980s to develop productivity software. The company decided to branch out into video game development because they would sometimes work on PC games during downtime between projects. They decided to make a dungeon crawling game after playing Wizardry. FromSoftware initially attempted an action game for personal computers (PC)—featuring 3D CGI graphics and robots navigating an underground labyrinth—but stopped development as no PC at the time could handle the project. Following the public announcement by Sony of the PlayStation home console, FromSoftware successfully pitched the project after redesigning it to focus on first-person exploration. The game was later called the brainchild of company founder Naotoshi Zin, who was considered a key creative figure in the series.

The game's development lasted less than six months, with a team of around ten people working on the game. The 3D dungeon environments were built using a development tool later dubbed "Sword of Moonlight" which was released for Japanese PCs in 2000 and included a version of King's Field. The game's title was taken directly from the name of a golf course one of the developer's directors saw while visiting England. Initially the game was revealed under the title Crystal Dragon.

King's Field was released by FromSoftware on December 16, 1994; this was thirteen days after the PlayStation console's Japanese release. It was later re-released as part of the PS One Books budget line on November 15, 2001. The game was then re-released on the Japanese PlayStation Store on July 26, 2007. The game has never been released outside Japan, though an English fan translation was released in 2006. The King's Field fan website "Sword of Moonlight" also hosts the translation.

A mobile phone version, King's Field Mobile, was released in 2004 exclusively in Japan for the Yahoo! Keitai, i-mode, and EZweb services. It features different map layouts, quicksaving, and an automap function. An enhanced version, King's Field EX, was released the same year exclusively for the Yahoo! Keitai phones. It has enhanced dungeons and new monsters, weapons, and armour. Both games were preserved and translated to English in 2025.

== Reception ==
Reception

Review scores
Publication	Score
AllGame	4/5
Famitsu	8/10, 5/10, 8/10, 9/10
Next Generation	2/5
Dengeki PlayStation	75/100, 60/100, 80/100, 65/100

Due to its difficulty and unconventional structure, the initial reaction from both players and the press was polarized. This early reaction negatively affected sales, but through word of mouth and magazine advertisements sales of the game picked up, resulting in the game being a commercial success.

On release, Famicom Tsūshin positively compared the game to PC titles of the time, and enjoyed its real-time combat and sense of fear it generated. One reviewer was fairly negative about the quality of its 3D graphics. In an import review, Next Generation praised the game's RPG elements, but found its combat to be slow and unrewarding. The reviewer commented that the game would "leave the gamer frustrated on one level or the other."

== Legacy ==
The eventual success of the first King's Field (selling twice as much as FromSoftware predicted) prompted the development of sequels, establishing the King's Field series. The design of King's Field would influence later titles by the developer including Shadow Tower, which used similar mechanics to King's Field; and Demon's Souls, described by its staff as a spiritual successor to King's Field, and inspired multiple follow-up titles which form part of the Dark Souls series and propelled FromSoftware to international fame.
