= Bass Landing =

- Developer: Tose
- Publishers: JP: ASCII Entertainment; NA: Agetec
- Platform: PlayStation
- Release: JP: January 14, 1999; NA: September 30, 1999
- Genre: Sports (Fishing)
- Mode: Single-player

Bass Landing 2
- Developer: Tose
- Publishers: JP: ASCII Entertainment; NA: Agetec
- Platform: PlayStation
- Release: JP: March 21, 2000; NA: February 14, 2001
- Genre: Sports (Fishing)
- Mode: Single-player

Bass Landing 3
- Developer: Tose
- Publisher: Sammy Corporation
- Platform: PlayStation 2
- Release: JP: July 3, 2003
- Genre: Sports (Fishing)
- Mode: Single-player

Bass Landing (バスランディング, Basu Randingu) is a fishing video game developed by Tose and published by ASCII Entertainment and North America by Agetec in 1999.

== Reception ==
Reception

Aggregate score
Aggregator	Score
GameRankings	70%

Review scores
Publication	Score
CNET Gamecenter	5/10
Electronic Gaming Monthly	7.5/10
Famitsu	28/40
Game Informer	7/10
GameFan	76% (Note: In GameFan's viewpoint of the game, one critic gave it 79, and the other 73.)
GamePro	2/5 (Note: GamePro gave the game two 2/5 scores for graphics and overall fun factor, 2.5/5 for sound, and 3.5/5 for control.)
GameRevolution	B
IGN	7.7/10
Official U.S. PlayStation Magazine	3.5/5
PlayStation: The Official Magazine	3/5

The game received above-average reviews according to the review aggregation website GameRankings. In Japan, Famitsu gave it a score of 28 out of 40.

== Sequels ==
There are two sequels to the game: Bass Landing 2, released in 2000-2001, and Bass Landing 3, which was only released in Japan for PlayStation 2 in 2003, and developed by Sammy Corporation.

== See also ==
Bass Rise
