= Echo Night (video game) =

1998 video game

- Japanese box art
- Developer: FromSoftware
- Publishers: JP: From Software; NA: Agetec
- Director: Akinori Kaneko
- Producer: Toshifumi Nabeshima
- Designer: Sakumi Watanabe
- Writer: Toshifumi Nabeshima
- Composers: Tsukasa Saitoh; Kota Hoshino
- Series: Echo Night
- Platform: PlayStation
- Release: JP: August 13, 1998; NA: July 22, 1999
- Genre: Graphic adventure
- Mode: Single-player

Echo Night is a 1998 adventure game developed by FromSoftware for the PlayStation. It is the first game in the Echo Night series, following up with the Japan-exclusive Echo Night 2: The Lord of Nightmares in 1999, and Echo Night: Beyond in 2004. A spin-off for the PlayStation Portable was included with Adventure Player, an adventure game creation tool, which was released in Japan in June 2005.

The story follows Richard Osmond as he searches for his missing father, and investigates his connection to two magical stones aboard the ghost ship Orpheus, which mysteriously disappeared at sea.

== Gameplay ==
Echo Night is played from a first-person perspective. The player can navigate different environments and interact with various items to progress the story. The player is often transported into the past via NPCs or certain objects to uncover more information pertaining to the story and characters. Aboard the Orpheus, the player must talk with souls of deceased passengers and solve puzzles to fulfill their final wishes and help them move on. As the player fulfills these tasks, the souls will vanish and leave behind an "astral piece", which can be used to get different game endings. Occasionally the player will encounter hostile ghosts who will attack and can deplete the player's health. There are no combat or defensive items in Echo Night, so when confronted with an aggressive ghost, the player must turn on the lights in the room to ward off the ghosts. These light switches often require additional puzzle solving, and sometimes can only be accessed after helping souls in the area move on.

== Plot ==
A cutscene in 1913 depicts the passenger liner Orpheus navigating stormy waters. On-screen text explains the ship mysteriously vanished without a trace, and search teams were unable to find evidence of its disappearance.

The game begins in 1937 at the apartment of Richard Osmond as he examines a strange key mailed to him from his estranged father, Henry Osmond. Immediately afterwards he receives a phone call from the police stating that Henry has been missing for some time and now his house has mysteriously burned down. The police allow Richard to investigate the remnants of his father's home, whereupon Richard is able to use the mysterious key to find a secret passageway leading to his father's diary. When Richard touches the diary, he is transported to a scene on a moving train with a young man. Also onboard the train are an old man named William Rockwell and his young granddaughter Crea. The young man attempts a gunfight with William, but the old man takes Crea hostage and forces the young man to surrender. William immediately shoots the young man and leaves his presumably dead body with Crea as he goes to talk with the train conductor. The young man reveals himself to be alive after William leaves, having been protected by a magical blue stone that broke in half after being shot. He consoles a frightened Crea as he explains her grandfather has been possessed by demons, and that he intends to defeat the demons using the blue stone. He gives Crea half of the blue stone for protection, and introduces himself as Henry Osmond. William catches Henry as the latter attempts to escape, and Henry tries to reason that the source of William's possession is from a red stone in the hilt of a knife that William carries. William disbelieves Henry and refuses to give up the knife, so Henry jumps from the train to escape.

The game shifts back to Richard at Henry's house. As Richard reads his father's diary, it is revealed the events on the train occurred 38 years ago and Henry has cryptically decided to revisit the Orpheus to confront the evil of the red stone. As Richard explores the house, he finds a magical painting that transports him aboard Orpheus. While investigating the seemingly abandoned ship, Richard is attacked by a young ghostly girl before a lightbulb mysteriously turns on and scares her away. A mysterious voice tells Richard that the ghosts are afraid of light. As Richard navigates Orpheus, he learns it was caught in a storm that killed all of the passengers onboard, and as he further explores the ship, he saves the souls of the deceased passengers by resolving their personal issues. Each time he helps a soul move on, he is rewarded with a mysterious fragment called an astral piece. Richard has the option to exchange these pieces for helpful items from an enigmatic blind man onboard. The blind man also gives Richard the other half of the blue stone previously carried by Henry.

As Richard talks to the passengers, he unveils more information about the Rockwell family and the mystery of the red and blue stones. The red stone has the power to change a person's destiny to their will and accumulate wealth and power, but it requires human sacrifices. In contrast, the blue stone exists to be the opposite of the red stone. Richard meets the souls of William's son Arthur and daughter Hilda, who were murdered by William for their desire to stop his murderous spree. The children help Richard reach William so he can put a stop to his evil. Upon meeting William, Richard discovers him weary and regretful of his actions after learning Crea was killed for her half of the blue stone. Wanting to atone for his sins, he discloses the plot twist that the evil power of the red stone is currently possessed by Henry. He encourages Richard to combine the red and blue stones to stop Henry, and sends him back in time before Crea was murdered to retrieve the other half of the blue stone.

With the full blue stone intact, Richard confronts his father and learns Henry was able to kill William soon after boarding Orpheus, but his desire was to obtain the red stone all along. Henry sacrifices his soul to merge with the red stone, but Richard is able to destroy the red stone by combining it with the blue stone. As the ship begins to fall apart, a feeble Henry instructs Richard to leave Orpheus via the front of the ship in a timed sequence. A secret passageway can also be triggered there if Richard was able to find and submit all of the astral pieces from the souls aboard Orpheus to the blind man.

=== Game endings ===
The game has four endings depending on the player's decisions and whether they were able to submit all of the astral pieces:

- If the player fails to reach the ship's front within the allotted time, the ship disappears without a trace and a news article states Richard and his father mysteriously disappeared after their house fire.
- If the player reaches the front of the ship but does not activate the secret passageway, Crea's ghost saves Richard, and he awakens in his father's house. He leaves the house and approaches the policeman in the car, who asks Richard to get tools from the trunk since his car will not start. When Richard opens the trunk, he finds the red knife.
- Reaching the front of the ship and entering the secret passageway leads to a dialogue with the blind man, who offers Richard the power of the red gem. Two additional endings can be obtained depending on the player's choice:
  - If the player takes the cursed knife, Richard becomes possessed by the evil of the red gem and kills the policeman as they leave his father's house
  - If the player refuses the blind man's offer, the knife is destroyed and Crea's ghost saves Richard. The player is provided with cutscenes narrated by Crea congratulating Richard for destroying the stone and saving so many lives.

== Reception ==
Reception

Aggregate score
Aggregator	Score
GameRankings	64%

Review scores
Publication	Score
AllGame	3/5
Electronic Gaming Monthly	6/10
Famitsu	31/40
Game Informer	6.75/10
GameRevolution	C−
GameSpot	4.2/10
IGN	8/10
Official U.S. PlayStation Magazine	3/5
PlayStation: The Official Magazine	4/5
Dengeki PlayStation	85/100, 60/100, 70/100, 90/100
The PlayStation	81/100, 81/100, 70/100

The game received "mixed" reviews according to the review aggregation website GameRankings.

Japanese gaming magazine Famitsu gave the game a 31 out of 40 score.
