= Echo Night: Beyond =

2004 video game

- European box art
- Developer: FromSoftware
- Publishers: JP: FromSoftware; NA: Agetec; EU: Indie Games Productions
- Producer: Toshifumi Nabeshima
- Designer: Eri Ogawa
- Programmer: Kyoichi Murata
- Composers: Tsukasa Saitoh; Koichi Suenaga
- Series: Echo Night
- Platform: PlayStation 2
- Release: JP: January 22, 2004; NA: July 27, 2004; EU: August 26, 2005
- Genres: First-person adventure Survival horror
- Mode: Single-player

Echo Night: Beyond, known in Japan as Nebula: Echo Night, is a 2004 survival horror adventure video game developed by FromSoftware for the PlayStation 2 console. Agetec published the game in North America, with the European release, by Indie Games, following in August 2005. It is the third game in the Echo Night series. While it shares common elements with Echo Night and Echo Night 2: The Lord of Nightmares, Beyond takes place in its own timeline.

The game tells a science fiction ghost story, set in the not-too-distant future. Players take on the role of a newlywed, off for a honeymoon on the Moon. The vessel crashes before reaching its lunar resort destination, however, separating the just-married couple and leaving the hero alone at an abandoned research base. Players explore the station from a first-person perspective, inside a spacesuit. In addition to the many spiritual anomalies that haunt the station, strange lunar lights and relative weightlessness add to the atmosphere of the game's environments.

== Gameplay ==
Echo Night: Beyond is played from a first-person perspective. When confronted by a ghost, the player must run before the player character's heart rate reaches a critical level; otherwise, he will die of a heart attack. There are no means of directly defending against ghosts; they must be avoided. The player's spacesuit is equipped with a flashlight, but it must be kept charged by batteries. The ghosts can be defeated only by clearing the mist they inhabit. This is done by using a control panel to activate the ventilation system. To purify the souls of the dead, personal items important to them in life must be found and brought to them. The only exception to this is the priest ghost, who will pop out from time to time. When ghosts must be avoided, they can be spotted through the use of security monitors, which are placed throughout the station.

== Plot ==
The game's storyline concerns Richard Osmond, who is flying in a space shuttle to a Moon base with his newly wed wife Claudia, with whom he will spend his honeymoon at their resort destination. A supernatural force causes the shuttle to crash during landing, however, killing many and releasing their ghostly spirits upon the base. Richard awakens and, discovering that he is alone, decides that Claudia might be elsewhere. The game centers around finding her, while also putting to rest the uneasy souls that roam the base.

Shortly after arriving on the base, Richard encounters a strange man whom seems to know him. He follows the man back to his room, which is painted to resemble a field. Every time Richard frees a spirit, the spirit's picture is painted on the walls. The man reveals that he is an android who enjoys painting. He also knows Claudia, saying that she is skilled in engineering.

Richard continues to explore the base, freeing various spirits. He frees employees, passengers and a team of astronauts. When viewing various recordings, Richard learns of the facility's chief, whom discovered a strange red stone. Though he initially wanted to mine it for its high oxygen production, he later discovers that it grants wishes at the costs of life. He used it on his close friend, Kenneth, and wished that the facility would be successful. When the oxygen was being harvested from the mineral, the resulting fog escaped and filled the base, causing pain to the souls. Richard also discovers that the chief had a relationship with Claudia.

Near the end of his journey, the android reveals that he is Kenneth, and that his picture would be finished soon. After freeing all the souls, Kenneth tells Richard that the stone was what started the whole thing and is what he will be faced with in the end. He asks Richard to come back to his room one last time, saying that his picture is done. If the player returns to the room, Richard finds that Kenneth has become part of his painting. A keycard on the desk takes an elevator to the B2 level. There, Richard finds a mummified corpse, which is the chief of the facility. He finds a ring and a letter on the table next to him, saying he was in love with Claudia.

Richard proceeds to the observatory, where he finds the specter of Claudia. She used the red stone to kill herself and wished that she would see Richard again. She then offers Richard the stone. Depending on the choices made, the ending will be different.

- If Richard did not obtain the letter from the B2 room and accepts the stone, Claudia says "he" died, but has no regrets. She fades away in a bright flash. Richard looks behind the statue she was in front of and finds her dead body. Richard looks at the ceiling and holds the red stone up. He then stabs the sharp end of the stone into himself and falls to the ground, staring at Claudia's corpse before the screen fades black.
- If Richard did not obtain the letter from the B2 room and does not accept the stone, Claudia says that they have the same thoughts and was happy that she knew him. She thanks him as she fades away in a bright flash. Richard finds her body behind the statue and carries it to the main hub. There, he sets it down and stares at Earth through the skylight.
- If Richard did obtain the letter from the B2 room, he gives it to Claudia, who reveals that the chief was actually the real Richard Osmond and that the player is an android created by her. If the player accepts the stone Claudia says he looked just like the real Richard and said she wished he was the real Richard before fading away. Richard finds her corpse behind the statue. He looks at the ceiling and holds the stone up before the screen fades black. His fate is unknown.
- If Richard did obtain the letter from the B2 room and refuses the stone, Claudia says that she can return to Earth with Richard inside her and thanks the player, saying she loved him as well. She fades away, with Richard discovering her corpse behind the statue. The game then shifts to a cutscene that shows Richard carrying her body into a funeral chamber. He pauses briefly to look at the portrait of himself on the wall. It is after that moment that you can see the Android Richard's face inside his helmet. He places Claudia in a coffin at the front of the chamber and places a ring on her finger (it is unknown if this is the ring he possessed at the beginning of the game or the one from the B2 room). The coffin is then blasted out into space, where the Earth's reflection is seen on it. Richard returns to the hub and gazes at Earth through the skylight before the screen fades black.

== Reception ==
Reception

Aggregate score
Aggregator	Score
Metacritic	60/100

Review scores
Publication	Score
Electronic Gaming Monthly	5.5/10
Eurogamer	5/10
Famitsu	27/40
Game Informer	6/10
IGN	6/10
Official U.S. PlayStation Magazine	3/5
PlayStation: The Official Magazine	7/10

The game received "mixed" reviews according to the review aggregation website Metacritic. In Japan, Famitsu gave it a score of three sevens and one six for a total of 27 out of 40.
