= Graffiti Kingdom =

2004 video game

- European cover art
- Developer: Taito
- Publishers: JP: Taito; NA: Hot-B; PAL: 505 GameStreet
- Director: Osamu Inoue
- Producer: Takeshi Kamimura
- Artist: Yoshiharu Sato
- Composer: Yasunori Mitsuda
- Platform: PlayStation 2
- Release: JP: September 22, 2004; PAL: June 30, 2005; NA: July 28, 2005
- Genre: Action role-playing
- Modes: Single-player, multiplayer

Graffiti Kingdom (Note: known in Japan as Rakugaki Ōkoku 2: Maō-Jō No Tatakai (ラクガキ王国2 魔王城の戦い)) is a 2004 action role-playing game developed by Taito for the PlayStation 2. It is the sequel to Magic Pengel: The Quest for Color (2002) and was released in North America by Hot-B and in PAL regions by 505 GameStreet. The game's soundtrack was composed by Yasunori Mitsuda.

== Gameplay ==
As in Magic Pengel: The Quest for Color, the player is able to create characters (known as "Graffiti Creatures") by drawing its body parts and assigning a function (such as "leg" or "head") to each part; however, unlike the previous game, its attacks and movement can also be customized. Additional tools for monster creating, such as decoration pens, limb functions, and a part cloning function, are added as the player's level increases. New attacks and movement abilities can be obtained by "capturing" other creatures, also allowing transformation into them for a short time. Collecting cards that rarely drop from defeated monsters adds them to the monster collection, allowing at will and unlimited time transformations as well as the ability to customize their appearance and attacks.

The versatility of monster creation has attracted considerable popularity, largely in Japan—a number of players have created detailed characters based both on original designs and those from existing video games, anime and other media. A larger collection can be saved on special save files, organized into card holders in game.

While combat in Magic Pengel used a turn-based battle system similar to rock–paper–scissors, Graffiti Kingdom is a more action-oriented platform game, although it retains some RPG-style elements such as the ability to level up, which increases maximum health and energy. Monster abilities such as higher jumps can be acquired to assist in platforming. These abilities and attacks run on limited energy that regenerates over time.

== Plot ==
The player takes the role of Prince Pixel of the Canvas Kingdom. Long ago, the kingdom was besieged by an evil Devil. This Devil was sealed away by a few brave knights bestowed with the power of Graffiti (called Graffiticians). Pixel happens upon the Devil's seal whilst avoiding his studies and takes the graffiti wand, breaking the seal. After an attempt by the seal's guardian, Pastel, to teach Pixel to use the wand results in the Devil's release, Pastel has Pixel face the Devil and restore the kingdom. Along the way, he meets Tablet, the Devil's son, who helps Pixel and challenges him throughout his adventures. He makes his way through the first few worlds, beating their bosses and acquiring their keys. En route to Palette, Tablet's sister, Pastel is kidnapped by Palette's agent.

Pixel proceeds to fight his way to Palette's palace, reaffirming the friendship Pixel has with Pastel. Pixel then faces off with Palette, defeating her. However, Tablet is seemingly killed when he takes an attack meant for Pixel. Determined to stop the Devil, Pixel fights through the Devil's palace and beats the Devil, leaving him near defeat. However, Tablet steals Pixel's wand and defeats his father instead before declaring himself the new Devil. Pastel gives Pixel a spare wand (many others of which she keeps inside her). Pixel defeats Tablet and creates a new body for him. Pixel then stops Pastel from re-sealing the Devil, which would also cause Pastel to be sealed in with him. The Devil escapes once more, albeit now severely weakened. Pixel agrees to let the Devil recuperate if he restores the kingdom as best he can. The ending cinematic shows Palette rampaging through the town before being battled offscreen by Pixel and Tablet.

== Reception ==
Reception

Aggregate score
Aggregator	Score
Metacritic	71/100

Review scores
Publication	Score
1Up.com	B+
Famitsu	29/40
Game Informer	6/10
GamePro	4.5/5
GameRevolution	C−
GameSpot	7.2/10
GameSpy	3/5
GameZone	7/10
IGN	6.8/10
Official U.S. PlayStation Magazine	4/5
Detroit Free Press	3/4

The game received "average" reviews according to the review aggregation website Metacritic. In Japan, Famitsu gave it a score of one seven, one eight, and two sevens for a total of 29 out of 40. GamePro and Official U.S. PlayStation Magazine gave it a favorable review about two-and-a-half months before the game's U.S. release.
