= Bowling (1999 video game) =

1999 video game

- Developer: Tamsoft
- Publishers: JP: D3 Publisher; NA: Agetec
- Platform: PlayStation
- Release: JP: November 18, 1999; NA: January 2001
- Genre: Sports video game
- Modes: Single-player, multiplayer

Bowling, known in Japan as Simple 1500 Series Vol. 18: The Bowling (SIMPLE 1500シリーズ Vol.18 THE ボーリング, Shinpuru 1500 Shirīzu Vol. 18 Za Bōringu) (part of the Simple 1500 series), is a sports video game developed by Tamsoft and published by D3 Publisher in 1999, and by Agetec in 2001, both for the PlayStation.

== Reception ==
Reception

Aggregate score
Aggregator	Score
GameRankings	57%

Review scores
Publication	Score
AllGame	2/5
Electronic Gaming Monthly	8/10
Famitsu	21/40
GameSpot	2.3/10
Official U.S. PlayStation Magazine	2/5
PlayStation: The Official Magazine	6/10

The game received mixed reviews according to the review aggregation website GameRankings. In Japan, Famitsu gave it a score of 21 out of 40.
