= King's Field IV =

2001 video game

- Japanese cover art
- Developer: FromSoftware
- Publishers: JP: FromSoftware; NA: Agetec; PAL: Metro3D
- Directors: Rintaro Yamada; Satoru Yanagi
- Producer: Shinichiro Nishida
- Programmer: Takeshi Suzuki
- Artist: Keiichiro Ogawa
- Composer: Tsukasa Saitoh
- Series: King's Field
- Platform: PlayStation 2
- Release: JP: October 4, 2001; NA: March 26, 2002; EU: March 28, 2003; AU: May 28, 2003
- Genre: Action role-playing
- Mode: Single-player

King's Field IV, (Note: Kingusu Fīrudo Fō (キングスフィールドIV)) released in North America as King's Field: The Ancient City, is a 2001 action role-playing game developed by FromSoftware for the PlayStation 2. It is the fourth entry in the King's Field series. It was released in North America by Agetec in 2002 and in Europe by Metro3D in 2003.

== Plot ==
In the land of Heladin, something is amiss. Their king, smitten by a strange idol that was given to him as a gift, lies dying. The country was enveloped with a strange sorrow, a certain darkness that stains the soul of man. Ever since the idol was brought into the kingdom, the once prosperous nation fell into a state of corruption and decay. Fearing for the life of his king and home, the sword master Septiego took a battalion of his best men to return the idol which was believed to be the source of this tragedy. Alas, the party was neither seen nor heard from again. The idol was presumed lost forever, but the decay of the nation continued.

Meanwhile, in the adjoining kingdom of Azalin, a shrouded figure appears at the doorstep of Prince Devian. From within his cloak, the dark stranger produced the object of Heladin's corruption: The Idol of Sorrow. The idol was originally taken from the ruined depths of the Holy Land, now known as the Land of Disaster, and given to the unsuspecting king of Heladin. If the idol remained outside of the ancient city, Heladin, and possibly Azalin, was doomed to mirror the twisted metropolis that spanned the vast caverns of the Land of Disaster.

With strong resolve, Devian embarked on his quest to return the cursed idol and return prosperity and vitality to his neighboring kingdom. His adventure through the ancient city would lead him to many discoveries long since lost after the collapse of the Holy Land. He would encounter the last vestiges of Septiego's troupe, and eventually discover their master's fate. Prince Devian would learn about the ancient and wise Forest Folk, the neighboring Earth Folk, and their war against the nightmarish Dark Folk. All of these secrets and more would be revealed to the young Prince, but does he have the strength of heart to harbor such monstrous truths?

== Reception ==
Reception

Aggregate score
Aggregator	Score
Metacritic	60/100

Review scores
Publication	Score
AllGame	3.5/5
Electronic Gaming Monthly	3.33/10
Famitsu	30/40
Game Informer	6.5/10
GamePro	4/5
GameSpot	6.6/10
GameZone	8.2/10
IGN	6.6/10
Official U.S. PlayStation Magazine	2/5
RPGamer	6/10

The game received "mixed" reviews according to the review aggregation website Metacritic. In Japan, Famitsu gave it a score of 30 out of 40.
