= Lil' Monster =

1999 video game

- Cover art of Lil' Monster
- Developer: KID
- Publishers: JP: KID; NA: Agetec
- Platform: Game Boy Color
- Release: JP: July 30, 1999; NA: August 2000
- Genre: Adventure
- Mode: Single-player

Lil' Monster, known as Gem Gem Monster (ジェムジェムモンスター) in Japan, is a video game for the Game Boy Color handheld, published by Agetec. The game entailed players to train small monsters used for training and battling, and collect sixty kinds of gem and six gem chips, while defeating Cool Joe who has become infamous for his evil deeds and cheating all across the land, in gem battles which his brother, Hot Joe, invented.

== Gameplay ==
Lil' Monster is a turn based battling game with life simulation and deck building elements. The main objective is acquiring gems that can be used to turn into monsters to battle for training or gifting items to, put into the deck to use as moves in the battles, or sold for coins to pay for items or runs at challenges such as Gemroku. Gifting items may lead the monster to reveal locations in the world. There are also items that can be used to restore the monster's health outside of battle, such as an orange can. Players can also work to fill out a picture book describing each monster.

Battling a monster and winning grants a gem based on the monster fought, while losing or giving up costs the used gem. Exactly 20 gems can be put in a deck, and during battle four gems from the deck appear as moves that can be selected for the player's monster to use. After one is selected, the monster charges up to use the move, and a random gem reloads into the used slot after the action gauge fills. However, some gems can clear the four slots, resulting in four random gems appearing in their place, and other gems may cause the monster to be unable to move temporarily. The opponent has their four gems shown and can be affected similarly. In addition, the suit of both monsters affects the damage that each gem can do to the opponent.

Hot Joe at the start gives the player one of five gems to use in a can to create a monster depending on what gem was used. For example, using the Heal gem produces a blue winged dolphinid monster Cupee. If the monster runs out of HP in battle or neglect, it dies, losing half of its LOVE (making it slower to act in battle), and a gem must again be put into a can to revive it. Getting stronger involves gaining EXP to level up and increase max HP, getting more gems to build a specialized deck for each battle, while keeping weight down and LOVE high to make the player's monster use moves more rapidly.
