= Bloody Vampire =

2012 video game

- Developer: Silver Star
- Publisher: Agetec
- Platform: Nintendo 3DS
- Release: JP: April 25, 2012; NA: January 31, 2013; PAL: May 9, 2013
- Genres: Platform-adventure, Metroidvania
- Mode: Single-player

Bloody Vampire (ブラッディヴァンパイア, Buraddi Vanpaia) is a 2012 action-adventure platform game for the Nintendo 3DS created by Japanese studio Silver Star and published by Agetec.

== Plot ==
The player character is Latis, a dhampir who enters a castle, which has mysteriously appeared in the human world, to defeat its vampire overlord.

== Gameplay ==
Bloody Vampire is a side-scrolling action-adventure game in which the player controls Latis as she finds her way through a vast, maze-like castle. She fights enemies in similar fashion to Hydlide or Ys, bumping into enemies with her body and either inflicting or taking damage depending on her strength and position. She will collect coins by defeating enemies that can then be used to buy equipment from shops. In order to progress deeper into the castle, she will need to acquire certain special items that grant her new abilities and allow her to traverse obstacles.

== Reception ==
Reception

Aggregate score
Aggregator	Score
Metacritic	65/100

Review scores
Publication	Score
GamesMaster	64%
Nintendo Life	7/10
Official Nintendo Magazine	61%
Pocket Gamer	3/5

Bloody Vampire holds a rating of 65/100 on review aggregate site Metacritic, indicating "mixed or average reviews". Nintendo Life said, "Bloody Vampire is a bit rough around the edges, and it's far from original, but it combines its sleeve-borne influences into a stylised package that's a lot of fun"; however, it expressed reservation over the "designated save spots and the absence of a map". Pocket Gamer said, "Bloody Vampire has the potential to be great, but it's far too sketchy to properly enjoy", criticizing the lack of feedback in the combat system, the lack of a map, and the "under-developed" inventory system.
