= Magic Pengel: The Quest for Color =

2002 video game

- North American cover art
- Developer: Garakuta-Studio
- Publishers: JP: Taito; NA: Agetec
- Composer: Zuntata
- Platform: PlayStation 2
- Release: JP: March 20, 2002; NA: June 24, 2003
- Genre: Role-playing
- Modes: Single-player, multiplayer

Magic Pengel: The Quest for Color, known as Garakuta Meisaku Gekijō Rakugaki Ōkoku (ガラクタ名作劇場 ラクガキ王国, Garakuta Meisaku Gekijō Rakugaki Ōkoku; lit. 'Junk Masterpiece Theatre Doodle Kingdom') in Japan, is a 2002 role-playing video game developed by Garakuta-Studio and Taito for the PlayStation 2, published by Agetec in North America. The music was composed by Zuntata.

Studio Ghibli, alongside GAINAX, worked on the game's art direction and animation, with support from Anime Torotoro. Various artists from the Japan Cartoonists Association contributed character designs.

The game had a sequel in 2004 titled Graffiti Kingdom.

== Gameplay ==
Combining the collectible monsters genre (e.g., Pokémon) with the interactive art genre (e.g., Mario Paint), Magic Pengel is centered on the player, as a character able to manipulate a "Pengel" (which looks like a stylized fairy combined with a paintbrush) to create a creature, or "Doodle". Using the Pengel (pronounced "pen-jell") as a cursor, the player simply sketches out the limbs, body, and other features. Depending on the amount of magic ink expended, and the types of body parts, the creature will be given certain statistics and created. With the help of Zoe and Taro, the character trains and battles using custom-created designs, which can be traded to or battled with the creations of other players. As the Doodles battle, they become more powerful, and earn points towards the purchase of pre-created Doodles, and extra abilities towards customizable creation. Combat functions according to three selections: attack, magic, and block, as well as a charge command. The three basic maneuvers follow a standard rock paper scissors methodology, but repetitiveness is minimized due to the varied attributes of the Doodles, as well as the inability to successively repeat any selection.

Magic Pengel combines cel-shading with standard 3D graphics. Though most of the backgrounds are 3D, the Doodles are cel-shaded. Occasionally the animations of the Doodles can be jerky due to the extreme range of customization possible within the game, but this is fairly uncommon.

== Plot ==
=== Story ===
The story begins when you (the main character - this character is never shown or given a default name in order to keep with the "second person" feel of the game, however, it is implied that the unseen character is a young boy) wake up in someone's yard and sees a Pengel. A mysterious voice tells you that you can use the Pengel to draw whatever you like, and that the shape will become your companion on your quest. You draw a simple shape to become your first Doodle, however, the Doodle falls off a cliff and is rescued by a girl. Then it runs away. After lecturing you, the girl introduces herself as Zoe, then introduces her (foster) brother, Taro. She takes you to the arena where a tournament is being held and teaches you how to duel. You win, and Zoe gets ticked off at the kingdom's guards for taking some of the Color you won as tax.

It is revealed that the King who rules the humans is corrupt and tries to force pure-hearted people to draw Doodles to work for him. One of his best Doodlers, Galileo (who is Zoe and Taro's father) disappeared and the king has been trying to seek revenge by taking away Zoe and Taro's homeland. Zoe and Taro don't know where Galileo went, and have been searching for their father by throwing notes in a bottle into the ocean. You must enter tournaments to get the money Zoey and Taro need to pay off the mortgage on their Homeland, help them search for their father, and eventually defeat the Doodle King himself.

=== Characters ===
Magic Pengel is known for its flexibility in characters - players can create their own. Unlike Graffiti Kingdom, the second game in the Rakugaki Ōkoku series, the "main character" does not exist: the storyline revolves around the player being sucked into Zoe and Taro's world. However, there is a small cast of important characters, and a large cast of secondary characters, that play roles in the storyline.

- Pengel The creature with the ability to draw Doodles that come to life. He is able to create more powerful Doodles as the storyline progresses and you win more duels. A person can only have a Pengel if he or she has a pure heart. Despite this, most people, even mean people, have one, when Zoe, who got angry at her Doodles once, does not.
- Zoe The player's closest friend, Zoe is a stubborn girl who hates the King. According to a boy named Denka, she is Denka's girlfriend, however, she has never done anything to indicate the feeling is mutual. She used to be able to use a Pengel, however, when her foster father disappeared, she blamed Doodles and grew angry. Her Pengel disappeared, and Zoe confesses she has felt guilty ever since. She refuses to believe Galileo is dead, even though others disagree. At the end of the story, Zoe and Taro move away.
- Taro Zoe's foster brother and the famous Doodler Galileo's son. Taro is an innocent, sometimes whiny, young boy who looks up to Zoe but gets upset that she is always getting mad at him and calling him a baby. Indeed, he does cry quite a lot, but he is able to use a Pengel and is a surprisingly good Duelist. On rare occasions, he will face you at the seaside arena.
- Mono Mono is a mysterious boy who shows up at Zoe and Taro's house one day. He has the ability to create Color Gems by taking away the color of a natural object. It turns out that Mono is a Doodle drawn by Galileo, who taught him how to speak and raised him as a son. Mono has come to the island because of the bottles sent out by Zoe and Taro, so he can tell the truth about Galileo - he is, indeed, dead. Mono is later revealed to be the reincarnation of the Doodle King, and the player must defeat him at the end of the game.
- Galileo A world-famous Doodler who ran away to avoid having to work for the King, leaving his son and foster daughter behind with nothing but their old house. He drew a Doodle named Mono to keep him company while he was away, but died while Mono was young. The cause of his death, as well as whether or not he ever had any intention to come back for Zoey and Taro or fight the King, is unknown.
- King The corrupt ruler of the human world, the King forces skilled Duelists to draw for him. Eventually, this angers the Doodle King to the point of taking away all the color on the world.
- Kiba A man who claims he used to be Galileo's close friend. Zoe and Taro both like him at first, but then they find out he is a double agent who works for the King.

== Technology ==
The drawing technology used to draw characters was based on Takeo Igarashi's "Teddy" software.

== Marketing ==
Prior to release, the game was advertised at the 2001 Nihon SF Taikai as well as in Japanese cinemas playing Spirited Away.

During around four months, between Sep 3rd and Oct 31st of 2001, doodles drawn by various players and artists were collected.

Later that year, the game had a playable demo at the 2001 Tokyo Game Show.

Near the release date, 29 different versions of the game's commercial were played on TV, in an attempt to break the then Guinness World Record of 17.

After release, a doodle drawing contest was held for one month, from July 12th to August 12th of 2002. It offered special prizes such as the theme song in single format, artwork stickers, a PS2 memory card, and a framed celluloid animation frame.

== Reception ==
Reception

Aggregate score
| Aggregator | Score |
|---|---|
| Metacritic | 74/100 |

Review scores
| Publication | Score |
|---|---|
| Edge | 7/10 |
| Electronic Gaming Monthly | 7.67/10 |
| Famitsu | 32/40 |
| Game Informer | 8/10 |
| GamePro | 3.5/5 |
| GameRevolution | C+ |
| GameSpot | 7.1/10 |
| GameSpy | 3/5 |
| GameZone | 8.5/10 |
| IGN | 8.5/10 |
| Official U.S. PlayStation Magazine | 4/5 |
| The Cincinnati Enquirer | 4/5 |

Magic Pengel received "average" reviews according to the review aggregation website Metacritic. In Japan, Famitsu gave it a score of 32 out of 40.

IGN's Jeremy Dunham found that the monster creation system lives up to its potential for creating unique-looking creatures and providing gameplay depth, since different body parts, colors, and sizes affect abilities and statistics in battle. Despite considering the rock-paper-scissors battle system simplistic on paper, he greatly enjoyed it thanks to the variety of attacks and magic spells that could be discovered with each custom monster. Issues he discovered included a hard-to-control camera, a short and repetitive main quest, and an unremarkable soundtrack. Dunham did, however, enjoy the colorful graphical style and pleasant character designs. He concluded that while the game probably would not appeal to a wide audience, it had the makings of a cult classic.

== In other media ==
- Zoe and Taro make a cameo appearance in Graffiti Kingdom and LostMagic, later games developed by Taito. They appear in the background in the final cutscene of Graffiti Kingdom, and appear older in LostMagic than they were in Magic Pengel, Taro in particular seems to have aged a bit. The fact that they're a bit older and on a journey (like the one they left on at the end of Magic Pengel) suggests that LostMagic takes place some time after Magic Pengel.
