= Forever Kingdom =

2001 video game

- North American box art
- Developer: FromSoftware
- Publishers: JP: FromSoftware; NA: Agetec
- Director: Yuzo Kojima
- Producer: Masanori Takeuchi
- Artists: Junichiro Ishino; Ken Sugawara
- Writer: Mie Takase
- Composer: Kota Hoshino
- Platform: PlayStation 2
- Release: JP: June 21, 2001; NA: January 22, 2002
- Genre: Action role-playing
- Mode: Single-player

Forever Kingdom, known in Japan as Evergrace II, is an action role-playing game released for the PlayStation 2 by FromSoftware. It is the prequel to EverGrace.

== Story ==
The game takes place directly before the events of Evergrace. Darius lived a somewhat sheltered life with his parents in the small village of Solta. Though not having any siblings, Darius was very close to his friend Sharline, whom he cared for like a sister. However, Darius' simple home life in Solta would come to a tragic end when assassins hired by the secluded village of Morea murdered Darius' parents for unknown reasons. In addition to facing the loss of his family, Sharline was nowhere to be found, leaving Darius with the conclusion that she was also killed.

Shortly after the tragedy, Darius sought refuge with his childhood friend, Ruyan, from the village of Seclue. Ruyan's father agreed to take Darius under his wing, as well as training him in swordplay so that he might one day take vengeance against his adversaries. As time passed, Darius and Ruyan tirelessly trained together, eventually forming "The Four Swordsmen of Solta" with two other mentionable warriors, Drumhort and Saris.

Once prepared for his journey, Darius left Seclue in search of some answers into his parents' murder, as well as the disappearance of Sharline. Ruyan, being close to Darius, also decided to come along in hopes of aiding Darius in realizing his revenge. Though they travelled far abroad the continent of Edinbury, Darius and Ruyan's efforts had proven daunting. Just when they were about to give up all hope, however, the two suddenly stumbled upon an unconscious girl, who later claimed to suffer from amnesia. She could only recall her name—Faeana. Having nowhere else to go, Faeana decided to tag along with Darius and Ruyan, hoping that she might recognize someone or something along their journey.

=== The Eve of Disaster ===
A year or so ago, as Darius and Ruyan were on their journey, a great 'cataclysm' had taken place, believed to be a war between Rieubane and another political power. The war generally affected much of Edinbury and its people, causing somewhat of a great depression. Though the political affairs of Rieubane—as well as the cause of the war—yet remain unknown, Faeana is believed to have some strange involvement in the Eve of Disaster. However, she herself cannot recall the events.

=== Solca, Darsul, and the Soul Bind ===
Along their travels, Darius and co. happen upon a mysterious girl named Solca. Before any acquaintances can be made, however, a dark wizard named Darsul and his clad guardian appear to abduct the girl, making quick work of Darius and his party. Before vanishing into thin-air with Solca, however, Darsul places a curse known as the 'Soul Bind' on Darius and his friends. It is later discovered that the 'Soul Bind' is a powerful spell which links the lifeforce of those afflicted, causing them to share the same experiences through a form of empathy. Baring this in mind, the three have no choice but to temporarily set aside their affairs and seek a cure, lest they otherwise perish together.

== Gameplay ==
=== The Soul Bind ===
The Soul Bind is a curse placed on Darius and his party which causes them to share the same lifeforce. Thus, if a member of Darius' party is attacked, then they all endure damage. Consequently, healing one character also heals the other two, as well.

Generally, a 'Soul' gauge measures the overall lifeforce of the party, which is displayed at the bottom-left corner of the screen. When damage is taken by any of the three player-characters, the gauge decreases. If the gauge is completely depleted, then the entire party perishes simultaneously. While proving to be somewhat frustrating, the game features an option which allows Life Extracts (healing potions) to be used at the press of the button, removing some of the challenge of managing three characters who share one life gauge.

=== Character Growth ===
Rather than implementing a level-up system like most RPGs, Forever Kingdom utilizes character growth through equipment upgrading. Each item either raises or lowers attributes respectively, and may be tampered with at shops to increase this effectivity. Though very cost-heavy, character growth is seen to be more customizable with this method.

=== Battle Mechanics ===
Real-Time Combat: Forever Kingdom focuses on real-time combat environments between the player, two character allies controlled by AI, and real-time enemies. Since the player may only control one party member at any given time, the other two characters will engage enemies based on a strict AI script. Although, there is no way to customize this based on preference or character build. However, the player may switch between the three characters at any given time, allowing the computer to control the other.

Palmira Actions: Palmira actions are special skills associated with various equipment found in the game, each having its own set of Palmira. The available actions to a particular character are determined entirely by what that character is currently equipped with. Once the equipment is replaced with something else, the character's Palmira actions are replaced with new ones. Each character has a specific button associated with Palmira usage -- triangle, square and circle. The order may change depending on which character is currently under control of the player.

Combos: Forever Kingdom also implements a combo system, allowing the player to execute Palmira actions in large multitudes based on timing. When a Palmira action is used by one character, an icon will appear to indicate which button should be pressed to start the combo, though the icon will disappear shortly if the player does not react quickly enough. Once a combo is stringed, two or more characters will simultaneously bombard foes with their equipped actions, resulting in damage bonuses.

== Reception ==
Reception

Aggregate score
| Aggregator | Score |
|---|---|
| Metacritic | 64/100 |

Review scores
| Publication | Score |
|---|---|
| Electronic Gaming Monthly | 6.5/10 |
| Famitsu | 28/40 |
| Game Informer | 5/10 |
| GamePro | 3.5/5 |
| GameSpot | 6.3/10 |
| IGN | 7/10 |
| Official U.S. PlayStation Magazine | 1.5/5 |
| PlayStation: The Official Magazine | 6/10 |

The game received "mixed" reviews according to the review aggregation website Metacritic. In Japan, Famitsu gave it a score of 28 out of 40.
