= The Adventures of Cookie & Cream =

2000 video game

- North American PlayStation 2 cover art
- Developer: FromSoftware
- Publishers: JP: FromSoftware; NA: Agetec; EU: Empire Interactive
- Producer: Atsushi Taniguchi
- Designers: Naotoshi Zin; Hiroyuki Kani; Tetsuya Taniyama; Kazutaka Miura
- Writer: Jun Kamino
- Composers: Kota Hoshino; Ikuya Ichinohe
- Platforms: PlayStation 2, Nintendo DS
- Release: PlayStation 2: JP: December 7, 2000; NA: April 30, 2001; EU: May 4, 2001; Nintendo DS: JP: June 28, 2007; NA: July 2, 2007; EU: October 5, 2007; AU: October 18, 2007
- Genres: Action-adventure, platformer
- Modes: Single player, multiplayer

The Adventures of Cookie & Cream, known as Kuri Kuri Mix (Note: Japanese: くりクリミックス, Hepburn: Kuri Kuri Mikkusu) in Japan and Europe, is an action-adventure video game developed by FromSoftware for the PlayStation 2 released in 2000. In 2007, it was ported to the Nintendo DS as Cookie & Cream. (Note: Known in Japan as KuriKuri DS: Otasuke Island (Japanese: くりクリDS おたすけアイランド, Hepburn: Kuri Kuri DS Otasuke Airando).)

== Story ==
Cookie (known as Chestnut in the European and Japanese versions) and Cream are two bunnies who are on their way home on the eve of their clan's 'Moon Festival'. However, during the journey home, they meet a messenger who tells them that the moon is gone and that if no one finds it there will never be another festival. After each of them is given a crown as a symbol of courage by the mysterious messenger, they go on a journey to get the moon back.

== Gameplay ==
Players can choose from two different modes: versus and story. In story mode (one or two players), players must guide Cookie and Cream to the goal before the time runs out. In one-player story mode the player controls both Cookie and Cream at the same time; in two-player mode each player controls one character. On the PS2 version, the two players can either use separate controllers, or they can both use the same controller, with one player holding the left side and the other the right side. Throughout the game, Cookie has to navigate through many obstacles. Most obstacles require Cookie or Cream to perform a specific action so the other is able to advance past the obstacles. Players can collect silver watches which add 20 seconds of time and gold watches which add 50 seconds of time as they play through the levels. Throughout the story mode players can collect puzzle pieces to unlock more characters in versus mode. In versus mode 2 to 4 players compete to collect as many points as possible before reaching the goal. Versus mode on the PS2 version also offers Multitap support to allow the use of up to 4 controllers simultaneously.

== Nintendo DS release ==
In 2007, the game was ported to the Nintendo DS as Cookie & Cream.

The Nintendo DS version is reworked to account for the system's functions. Instead of both players doing platforming challenges in split screen, the first player does platforming on the top screen, and the second player performs contextual actions and puzzles with a stylus on the bottom screen. Like the PS2 version, Cookie & Cream can be played as either a single-player game where one person controls both characters, or a co-operative game where one player maneuvers Cookie while the other is in charge of Cream. Multiplayer is available with both local wireless or via Nintendo Wi-Fi Connection. Additional content includes a battle mode with 20 competitive mini-games that can be played with up to three other players.

== Reception ==
Reception

Aggregate scores
Aggregator	Score	
Aggregator	DS	PS2
GameRankings	66%	77%
Metacritic	65/100	78/100

Review scores
Publication	Score	
Publication	DS	PS2
Edge	N/A	7/10
Electronic Gaming Monthly	N/A	7.5/10
Eurogamer	7/10	N/A
Famitsu	23/40	30/40
Game Informer	7/10	8.75/10
GameRevolution	N/A	C+
GameSpot	7/10	8.1/10
GameSpy	4/5	85%
GameZone	7/10	N/A
IGN	7.8/10	7.9/10
Next Generation	N/A	4/5
Nintendo Power	6.5/10	N/A
Official U.S. PlayStation Magazine	N/A	3.5/5
X-Play	N/A	4/5

The Adventures of Cookie & Cream received "generally favorable reviews", according to the review aggregation website Metacritic. Critics praised the game's innovative and entertaining gameplay as well as its bizarre aesthetics and overall atmosphere. Game Informer gave a positive review, nearly two months before it was released in the United States. Greg Orlando of NextGen was positive to the game. In Japan, Famitsu gave it a score of 30 out of 40. Four-Eyed Dragon of GamePro said of the game, "Gather your friends for an unbelievable time with Cookie and Cream. You'll laugh at the story, pout about the hard puzzles, and wonder about why Cookie and Cream make such a good combination for the PS2." (Note: GamePro gave the PlayStation 2 version three 4.5/5 scores for graphics, sound, and control, and 5/5 for fun factor.)

The Nintendo DS version received "mixed or average" reviews, according to Metacritic. GameSpy praised the port as "a perfect fit for the DS's dual screens and wireless capabilities", and enjoyed how the touch screen puzzles affected the platforming. GameSpot enjoyed the game's "unique design and serious difficulty", but criticized the "bland" level design for platforming, finding the touch screen mini-games rather engaging and fun. In a pair of mixed reviews in Game Informer, Matt Helgeson said the interplay between styles in the single player mode "sometimes pays off in surprisingly inventive ways", but "just as often it's a complete mess", and found it too "clunky" to give high marks, but said "the great parts of this game are really something to experience"; Brian Vore had a similar assessment, saying "for all of the clever bits in Cookie & Cream, there's a hearty dose of frustration to go along with it", singling out some annoying mini-games, sloppy controls and an unhelpful camera angle. Eurogamer described the gameplay changes as "slightly disappointing" as the player in charge of the touch screen has little to do, and noted that "often it's more entertaining to tackle things on your own, giving you more to challenge yourself with", but concluded that it is fun to play through with a friend or to come to the aid of a younger player. In Japan, Famitsu gave it a 23 out of 40.
