= King's Field III =

1996 video game

- Japanese box art
- Developer: FromSoftware
- Publishers: JP: FromSoftware; NA: ASCII Entertainment
- Producer: Naotoshi Zin
- Programmer: Eiichi Hasegawa
- Writers: Toshiya Kimura; Shinichiro Nishida
- Series: King's Field
- Platform: PlayStation
- Release: JP: June 21, 1996; NA: November 20, 1996
- Genre: Action role-playing
- Mode: Single-player

King's Field III (Note: Kingusu Fīrudo Surī (キングスフィールドIII)) is a 1996 action role-playing game developed and published by FromSoftware for the PlayStation. It is the third entry in the King's Field series and the last one to be released on the original PlayStation.

The game was released on June 21, 1996 in Japan by FromSoftware and November 20, 1996 in North America by ASCII Entertainment. It was not released in PAL territories. The English-language version was renumbered and retitled King's Field II, because the original King's Field was not released outside Japan.

== Plot ==
The player takes the role of Verdite prince Lyle (ライル・ウォリシス・フォレスター) as he struggles to uncover the reasons behind his father Jean's sudden descent into madness and restore his kingdom.

== Gameplay ==
As in previous King's Field series titles, Gameplay mostly involves first-person battles, puzzle solving and exploration. The game takes place mostly in significant stretches of land above the ground, with the exception of some dungeons. Players can teleport between the different cities from the map screen.

== Reception ==
Reception

Aggregate score
Aggregator	Score
GameRankings	82%

Review scores
Publication	Score
Electronic Gaming Monthly	6.5/10, 7.5/10, 7.5/10, 6.5/10
Famitsu	28/40
GameSpot	7.3/10
Next Generation	3/5
Dengeki PlayStation	95/100, 90/100, 90/100, 100/100

Reviews for King's Field III widely praised the massive size of the game world and the resulting longevity, and criticized the slowness of the character movement and combat. Otherwise, however, critics were divided about the game. Of the four reviewers of Electronic Gaming Monthly, Shawn Smith praised several of the game's elements but found its gameplay too tedious, Dan Hsu and Crispin Boyer recommended it for its first person approach and various improvements over the previous installment, and Sushi-X criticized that the game is ahead of its time, using a design which would make a good future for RPGs but runs much too slow on contemporary hardware. A GamePro critic noted the improvements over King's Field II but judged that the slow, unbalanced combat remained a crippling flaw, remarking that "everything onscreen looks like it's moving underwater. A melee round against a low-level creature can take up to five minutes to complete." He concluded by expressing hope that there would be no further games in the series. Greg Kasavin of GameSpot also felt the improvements over King's Field II were insufficient, but primarily because they added up to more of a refinement of the original formula than a new direction. He concluded, "The first King's Field was an excellent game, and its like-minded sequel is even better. This is an exciting, non-linear journey filled to the brim with swords, sorcery, and secrets." Next Generation said that the combination of the action and RPG genres results in the game being shallow and dull by the standards of both genres, though they felt it could still be worthwhile for players who don't mind its slow pace.
