= Echo Night 2: The Lord of Nightmares =

1999 video game

- Developer: FromSoftware
- Publisher: FromSoftware
- Director: Akinori Kaneko
- Producer: Toshifumi Nabeshima
- Programmer: Akinori Kaneko
- Artist: Masahiro Kajita
- Writers: Toshifumi Nabeshima; Eiji Matsumoto; Hiroyasu Sugiyama
- Series: Echo Night
- Platform: PlayStation
- Release: JP: August 5, 1999
- Genre: Adventure
- Mode: Single-player

Echo Night 2: Nemuri no Shihaisha (Note: (Japanese: エコーナイト#2 眠りの支配者)) is a 1999 first-person adventure video game developed and published by FromSoftware for the PlayStation. It is the second game in the Echo Night series. While it shares common elements with Echo Night, Echo Night 2 takes place in its own timeline.

== Gameplay ==
Like the first game, Echo Night 2 is played from a first-person perspective, but unlike most other first-person games, there is no use of firearms in the game. When confronted by a ghost, the player must turn on the lights in the room by means of a light switch. The player is often transported into the past via passengers or certain objects. Once the player fulfills a task important to a spirit, they will vanish and drop an "Astral Piece" which can be used to get a different ending scene.

== Plot ==
The game starts with Richard Osmond searching for his girlfriend Christina Collins, who's been missing for three months after she was last seen entering the library reserve room of a university she attended. When the police investigation goes nowhere, Richard takes it upon himself to search for her. He enters the university's library and finds a photo of a woman resembling Christina named Jessica Clancy. Learning Jessica's family owns a large estate on the countryside, Richard heads to an old Gothic manor house with a research center behind it to find Christina. Inside he encounters hostile ghosts of family members, household employees and researchers that can be freed by resolving their personal issues.

Richard discovers Jessica and Christina, the latter formerly known as Rebecca Morgan, are twin sisters. They were adopted by different families following their parents deaths. Jessica is the wife of Albert Clancy, the owner of the estate. His research team found in the ancient ruins a Soul Stone, a mummified female and a red-headed woman who lived with the Clancys for generations without aging. The red-headed woman and her twin sister had an incurable illness until a mysterious merchant gave one of the twins the stone to kill the other in a ritual on the night of a crimson moon to achieve immortality. However, the red-headed woman became immortal when her sister sacrificed herself with the stone instead. Albert killed his family, servants and co-workers to cure his terminally ill wife, but to no avail. The red-headed woman convinced Albert to perform the same ritual and use the stone on Christina in order to save Jessica. Albert challenges Richard to find Christina before he does.

If the player collects one Astral Piece and finds Christina, Jessica kills Albert and succumbs to her illness. Richard marries Christina and have twins. If the player doesn't reach Christina in time regardless of collecting the Astral Pieces, Albert kills her and Jessica. Before he attacks Richard, an unknown assassin fatally shoots Albert. Richard was rescued by an amnesiac woman who he marries and refers to as his "Christina". If the player does not collect all of the Astral Pieces but finds Christina, Albert shoots Richard, accidentally wounding Christina in the crossfire. Albert commits suicide and the red-headed woman appears telling Richard to sacrifice Jessica if he wants to spare Christina's life. Richard kills Jessica using the stone. If the player collects all of the Astral Pieces and finds Christina, Albert is killed by the red-headed woman, leading to a dialogue with her brings two additional endings: if the player takes the stone, she will kill Richard with it. Refusing to take the stone destroys it, causing both the merchant and the red-headed woman to disappear. Jessica stays at the mansion after her illness subsides but remains in close contact with Richard and Christina.

== Release ==
Echo Night 2 was released for the Sony PlayStation on August 5, 1999, and published by FromSoftware. It was released only in Japan.

In 2007, it was re-released for the PlayStation Network in Japan.

In 2015, an English language fan translation was released.

== Reception ==
Reception

Review score
Publication	Score
Famitsu	8/10, 7/10, 8/10, 9/10

The game was reviewed by four writers in the Japanese magazine Famitsu. Most of the writers found Echo Night 2 to be very scary while one said it felt more melancholy than frightening. While one reviewer said the graphics were beautiful and helped enhance the atmosphere of the game, another said the character models improved upon the first Echo Night game, but still had room for improvement.

The reviewers found the game challenging, but not unforgivingly so. One reviewer found the difficulty of the puzzles to be unbalanced. Two reviewers found the controls confusing at first, with one saying that as the game does not have a lot of action, that this was forgivable.
