= King's Field =

Action role-playing game series

- Logo utilized in the original King's Field
- Genre: Action role-playing
- Developer: FromSoftware
- Publishers: FromSoftware; ASCII Entertainment; Agetec; Sony Computer Entertainment; Metro3D
- Platforms: PlayStation, PlayStation 2, PlayStation Portable, Windows, mobile phone
- First release: King's Field; December 16, 1994
- Latest release: King's Field: Additional II; 2006

King's Field (Japanese: キングスフィールド) is an action role-playing game series developed by FromSoftware. Titles have been released for the PlayStation, PlayStation 2, PlayStation Portable, Microsoft Windows, and various mobile phone platforms.

King's Field was released as a launch title for the PlayStation in 1994. The game's fully 3D, first person perspective was considered groundbreaking among role-playing video games of the time; it influenced FromSoftware's later work, most notably Demon's Souls and the Dark Souls series. The next two King's Field titles, King's Field II and King's Field III, were released in 1995 and 1996, respectively. King's Field IV was released for the PlayStation 2 in 2001.

== Games ==
Release timeline
1994	King's Field
1995	King's Field II
1996	King's Field III
1997–1999
2000	King's Field Making Tool
2001	King's Field IV
2002–2003
2004	King's Field Mobile
2004	King's Field EX
2005	King's Field Mobile II
2006	King's Field: Additional I
2006	King's Field: Additional II

=== PlayStation ===
The first game in the series, King's Field, was released only in Japan. While it was never officially localized into English, a fan-made English translation patch was released in 2006. In King's Field, the player takes the role of Jean Alfred Forrester. He is searching for his missing father, Hauser Forrester, who disappeared along with his soldiers while exploring a dead king's underground graveyard. Shorter than later entries in the series, King's Field includes five floors. The main aspects of gameplay consist of first-person battles, puzzle solving, and exploration.

After the success of the first game, King's Field II was released in North America and Europe, retitled King's Field without a numeral nor subtitle. In the sequel, the player takes the role of Granitiki prince Aleph (alternatively named Alef/Alexander) who is shipwrecked on Melanat, an accursed island that has drawn the attention and forces of the new king of Verdite, and an old friend: Jean.

In King's Field III (released in North America as King's Field II), the player takes the role of Verdite prince Lyle as he struggles to uncover the reasons behind his father Jean's sudden descent into madness and restore his kingdom. A large portion of the game takes place above ground, but the main aspects of gameplay remain unchanged: first-person battles, puzzle solving, and exploration.

=== PlayStation 2 ===
King's Field IV (released in North America as King's Field: The Ancient City) was the first game from the series released on the PlayStation 2 console. The game takes place within the Land of Disaster, where the forest folk once dwelled until an evil curse came upon the land. The player takes the role of Prince Devian of the Azalin Empire who has been given the task of returning the cause of the blight, the Idol of Sorrow, back to the cursed land. His journey follows the downfall of the Kingdom of Heladin and the exploits of Septiego the Sword Master who led an expedition of over 1000 men in a failed effort to return the cursed Idol.

=== PlayStation Portable ===
King's Field: Additional I is the first game of the series released on the PlayStation Portable. It was only released in Japan and was never localized into English. The "Additional" series uses a step-by-step style of gameplay, rather than free-roaming. King's Field: Additional II, the sequel, was also released only in Japan with no English localization. It featured the ability to import the player's character from Kings Field: Additional I, including all equipment and statistics.

=== Microsoft Windows ===
Sword of Moonlight: King's Field Making Tool is a King's Field designing tool for the Microsoft Windows platform which was released in Japan. It lets the user construct free-standing King's Field games which may be played independently, without having Sword of Moonlight installed. It also contains a full remake of the first King's Field game originally released on the PlayStation. A fan-made full English translation is available as an unofficial patch.

=== Mobile phone ===
King's Field Mobile was released in Japan for mobile phone on January 14, 2004. It was followed by two sequels: King's Field Mobile II on November 15, 2005, and King's Field EX on April 4, 2004.

== Merchandise and other media ==
To commemorate their 20th anniversary, FromSoftware released the special collection package called the King's Field Dark Side Box in 2007, which contained a reissue of the four King's Field games which had previously been released on the PlayStation and PlayStation 2, as well as soundtracks for all six games, a map of Verdite, and other bonuses.

== Reception ==
Critical reception for the series was generally mixed. Common criticisms included the slow-moving player character, low number of game characters (NPCs), difficult gameplay, and muddy colors. The series was lauded for its complex labyrinths, large seamless worlds, a wide variety of items and magic abilities, and narratives that had epic scope in a limited space, which would be echoed by the technical design of the descendent Souls series.

As opposed to other combat based role-playing video games, King's Field focuses more on exploration and a dark brooding ambience. The slow character movement facilitates streaming data from the game disc which eliminates loading screens that were common among most PlayStation titles. A spiritual successor to the series, Demon's Souls, was released in 2009. That game in turn served as a predecessor to the Dark Souls series, which in turn served as a predecessor to Elden Ring.
