= Demon's Souls =

2009 video game

- Packaging artwork used for most regions
- Developer: FromSoftware (Note: Supervision and support from Japan Studio)
- Publishers: JP: Sony Computer Entertainment; NA: Atlus; PAL: Namco Bandai Partners
- Director: Hidetaka Miyazaki
- Producers: Masanori Takeuchi; Takeshi Kajii
- Designer: Takashi Nakamura
- Programmer: Jun Ito
- Artists: Makoto Satoh; Masato Miyazaki; Hisao Yamada
- Writer: Hidetaka Miyazaki
- Composer: Shunsuke Kida
- Platform: PlayStation 3
- Release: JP: February 5, 2009; NA: October 6, 2009; PAL: June 25, 2010
- Genre: Action role-playing
- Modes: Single-player, multiplayer

Demon's Souls (Note: Japanese: デモンズソウル, Hepburn: Demonzu Souru) is a 2009 action role-playing game developed by FromSoftware and published by Sony Computer Entertainment for the PlayStation 3. It was released in Japan in February 2009, in North America by Atlus in October 2009, and in PAL territories by Namco Bandai Partners in June 2010. The game is referred to as a spiritual successor to FromSoftware's King's Field series.

Demon's Souls is set in Boletaria, a kingdom consumed by a dark being called the Old One, following its release through the use of forbidden Soul Arts. Players take on the role of a hero brought to Boletaria to kill its fallen king Allant and pacify the Old One. Gameplay has players navigating five different worlds from a hub called the Nexus, with a heavy emphasis on challenging combat and mechanics surrounding player death and respawning. Online multiplayer allows both player cooperation and world invasions featuring player versus player combat.

A collaboration between FromSoftware and Sony's Japan Studio, the game's early development was troubled due to a lack of coherent vision. Despite such issues, designer Hidetaka Miyazaki was able to take over the project and helped to turn the game into what it eventually became. The game's difficulty was intended to both evoke classic video games and provide a sense of challenge and accomplishment for players. This aspect proved demanding for Miyazaki, partly because of his fear that Sony would ask the team to lower the difficulty in order to make the game more accessible.

Announced in 2008, early reactions to the Demon's Souls demo were seen as negative, and the game's high difficulty prompted Sony to pass on publishing the game outside of Japan. The game initially had slow sales in Japan, but achieved commercial and critical success in the West through positive word of mouth, exceeding sales expectations. It was praised for its difficult combat and addictive gameplay, subsequently winning several awards. Demon's Souls introduced many of the core elements that would define the Soulslike genre and it has since been cited as one of the greatest games of all time. Its success led to the spiritual successor series Dark Souls. FromSoftware's relationship with Sony would lead to the release of Bloodborne and Déraciné, while a remake of the same name was released in 2020 for the PlayStation 5.

== Gameplay ==
The player confronting a dragon

Demon's Souls is a Soulslike action role-playing game where players take on the role of an adventurer, whose sex and appearance are customized at the beginning of the game, exploring the cursed land of Boletaria. Aspects of the customization impact various statistics (stats) related to gameplay. The player character is granted a starting character class, which further influences their stats, though they can be altered later in the game and effectively change a player's class combined with a different weapon choice. The world is divided into six areas; the Nexus hub world and five additional worlds subdivided into three areas that each end in a boss encounter, except for World 1, which is divided into 4. Combat is reliant on timing for weapon strikes and blocks, with different weapon types opening up a variety of combat options and altering the player's movement speed. Most actions drain a stamina meter, with its management forming a core part of combat. By defeating an enemy, the player acquires Souls, which act as both experience points to raise various statistics; and the game's currency for purchasing new weapons, armor and items. As the player invests, the number of souls required increases. Along with souls, players can retrieve items such as weaponry and ore for upgrading.

When a player is killed during a level, they are sent to the beginning of the level with all non-boss enemies re-spawned, while the player returns in soul form with lower maximum health and the loss of all unused souls. If the player manages to reach their bloodstain at the point where they were last killed, they regain their lost souls. However, if they are killed before then, the souls are lost permanently. Upon defeating a boss, the player can choose to re-spawn back to that location, marked in the form of an Archstone. When not exploring a level, the player resides in the Nexus, a realm that acts as a hub where the player can exchange souls, store items and travel between regions. After completing the initial portion of the first region, players can choose to progress through any other of the newly available regions.

Demon's Souls makes use of asynchronous multiplayer for those connected to the PlayStation Network. When navigating levels, players briefly see the actions of other players as ghosts in the same area that may show hidden passages or switches. When a player dies, a bloodstain can be left in other players' game world that when activated can show a ghost playing out their final moments, indicating how that person died and potentially helping the player avoid the same fate. Players can leave pre-written messages on the floor that can also help others such as forewarning safe or hostile positions, trap locations and tactics against enemies or bosses, among general comments. Co-operative play allows up to three characters to team up in a host world where visiting players appear in soul form that can only be returned to their bodies when a boss is defeated. In competitive play, players can invade another world as a Black Phantom to engage in combat with the host player. If the Black Phantom kills the host, they can be returned to their body in their own game, whereas if killed themselves, the host gains a portion of the Black Phantom's souls as well as the phantom losing an experience level. Some multiplayer elements are incorporated directly into gameplay events.

Several mechanics in the game are covered by World and Character Tendency. Character Tendency impacts the entire game, while World Tendency only affects a particular region. Character Tendency is influenced by a character's behaviour; starting from neutral, the player can shift their Tendency to black or white. Black tendency is triggered by actions such as killing NPCs and being antagonistic towards other players, in addition to dying repeatedly in a world. White tendency is born from helping others and being supportive to other players, and defeating bosses. World Tendency exists separately from Character Tendency; black tendency raises the difficulty by increasing enemy health while giving more valuable rewards, while white tendency allows more item drops and makes enemies weaker at the cost of rare items. World Tendency is also influenced by the overall Tendency of worlds on servers. At either end of the Tendency spectrum, exclusive events occur and new areas can be unlocked.

== Plot ==
Demon's Souls takes place in the kingdom of Boletaria. In ancient times, due to the misuse of magic known as the Soul Arts, Boletaria was attacked by a being called the Old One. The world was nearly consumed by the magical "Deep Fog" and the soul-eating demons it created. The Old One was eventually lulled to slumber, saving what remained of Boletaria, while some survivors became long-lived Monumentals to warn future generations. In the game's present, Boletaria's ruler King Allant restored the Soul Arts, awakening the Old One and its demon army. Boletaria is now being consumed by demons, with those humans without souls turning into insane monsters. Players take the role of an adventurer entering the fog engulfing Boletaria. After being killed, the player wakes up in the Nexus and meets a benevolent demon called the Maiden in Black, as well as various other characters.

Now bound to the Nexus until the Old One is returned to slumber, the player travels to five regions of Boletaria, killing the powerful demons controlling those areas and absorbing their souls to increase their power so they can face King Allant. However, the King Allant the player faces is revealed to be a demon imposter. After defeating the false King Allant, the Maiden in Black takes the player—now dubbed the "Slayer of Demons"—to the Old One. The Slayer of Demons faces the true King Allant, who has been transformed into a helpless blob-like demon, within the Old One's body. The Maiden in Black then arrives to put the Old One to sleep again.

If the Slayer of Demons leaves the Old One, they are hailed as the hero of a restored, though damaged, Boletaria, becoming a new Monumental to support the world as the knowledge of Soul Arts is lost. If the Slayer of Demons kills the Maiden in Black, the Slayer becomes a new, powerful demon in service to the Old One to sate their hunger for souls as the fog continues to spread.

== Development ==
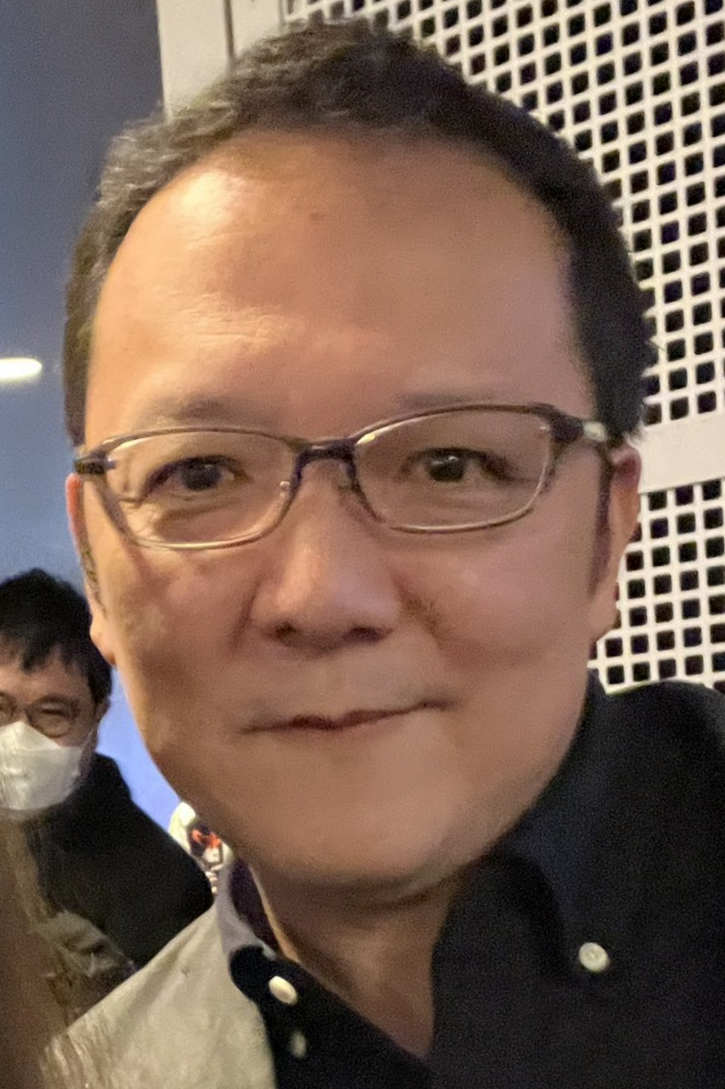
Hidetaka Miyazaki took over as director after the game ran into development difficulties.

Demon's Souls was developed by FromSoftware, a developer noted for creating the King's Field and Armored Core series. The project was first proposed and supported by Japan Studio. Demon's Souls was directed by Hidetaka Miyazaki, who had joined the company in 2004 and worked as a coder on the Armored Core series. The game was co-produced by FromSoftware's Masanori Takeuchi and Sony's Takeshi Kajii. The concept of reviving a "lost breed of action game" was first proposed by Kajii. Due to the team lacking a coherent vision, the original project had run into difficulties. Hearing about a high fantasy role-playing game which was considered a failure within the company, Miyazaki decided that if he took over the project, he could take it in any direction he wanted. Since it was already flagging, it did not matter if his own efforts failed. Including this early work, production of the game took approximately three years.

The initial concept for Demon's Souls came from FromSoftware's King's Field series, with Miyazaki citing its dark tone and high difficulty as the main inspirations for the game. Despite these inspirations, Miyazaki did not want to connect Demon's Souls to King's Field, and despite his urging otherwise many have termed the game as a spiritual successor to King's Field. Miyazaki hoped to take gaming back to its basics, creating a challenging gameplay-based experience he felt was dying out in the gaming market of the time. He wanted to create a game which would recreate the dark fantasy and hardcore feel of classic RPG titles (such as the King's Field and Wizardry series) on modern consoles, along with incorporated online elements. Miyazaki acknowledged some similarities to other video games such as Monster Hunter and Bushido Blade, but said the team did not have any specific video game influences in mind when creating Demon's Souls. After the first design documents were created, the game concept changed little during development. The final game did not come together in a playable form until very late in development, and even then there were network and framerate problems. The team were given a high amount of creative freedom, only possible due to what Kajii called "fortunate timing and release schedules".

The Souls system was a frequent subject of discussion during development, with the current system being decided upon as there being no risk of loss for souls would rob the game of any accomplishment for players. The unconventional death mechanics forced Miyazaki to carefully phrase the Soul mechanic during design document pitches to Sony, as he was worried they would insist on changes if they knew the full details. When creating the high difficulty, Miyazaki kept quiet about that aspect when talking with Sony, as he was sure they would insist upon the difficulty being lowered. He talked it over with Kajii, who agreed to keep that aspect quiet until release. Despite its reputation as a hard game, Miyazaki never intended the game to be hard, instead aiming for a challenging and rewarding experience for players. One scrapped idea was to introduce permanent death, but this was seen by staff as going too far. Variety was added to combat by changing how different weapons affected the character's movements, similar to The Elder Scrolls IV: Oblivion. All the bosses were designed based on a simple premise, in addition to being "varied and exciting".

The multiplayer mechanics were inspired by Miyazaki's experience of driving on a hillside after some heavy snow. When cars ahead stopped and started slipping back, they were deliberately bumped into and pushed up the hill by the cars behind them, thus allowing the traffic to flow. Unable to give his appreciation to the drivers before leaving the area, he wondered whether the last person in the line had made it to their destination, thinking that he would probably never meet those people again. Miyazaki wanted to emulate a sense of silent cooperation in the face of adversity. This gave birth to the Phantom systems, with the implementation of Black and Blue Phantoms designed to increase the variety of experience of players. The messaging system was intended to be nonintrusive, with Miyazaki comparing them to text messages. This system proved difficult for Miyazaki to explain to Sony, with him eventually comparing his messaging to the brevity of an email over a phone call so executives could understand it. The team wanted to avoid the formation of questing parties between players; the multiplayer was designed more to enhance the single-player content rather than be a separate mode. The Old Monk battle, which involved summoning another player as a Black Phantom during the boss battle, caused trouble due to the high number of bugs the team needed to sort out.

Describing the narrative, Kajii said the team's aim was to "sidestep preset narrative" to focus on gameplay. The world view and tone of the world drew from that of King's Field. The tone was influenced by both Miyazaki and Kajii, who were both fans of dark fantasy. When creating the world, Miyazaki drew inspiration from European folklore and mythology, contrasting with the trend of Japanese action RPGs to use Japanese folklore. Direct influences included Arthurian and Germanic folklore, the fantasy movies Conan the Barbarian and Excalibur, and the artwork of Frank Frazetta. The team were also influenced by old gamebooks. This darker art style was partly influenced by their goals with the gameplay. The art style was also influenced by Western titles more than those from Japan. The Maiden in Black was put in at Kajii's request as he wanted a heroine as part of the narrative. As she would be seen in close-up and eyes were the weakest aspect of character models, the team designed her without eyes. Miyazaki had several more worlds in his early design, with the latest to be cut being a world called the Library and an outside area for the Nexus. The Tower of Latria and Valley of Defilement were built around the respective themes of man-made and natural evil.

The fully orchestrated music was composed by Shunsuke Kida, who had worked on few video games but was famous for composing music for several Japanese television series. He was brought on board due to his skill at orchestral composition. The music was dark in tone, with many pieces for solo violin or piano, while other tracks made use of a full orchestra. The vocal work was all choral, maintaining the game's dark atmosphere. Three tracks included vocal work from Japanese singer Kokia.

== Release ==
Demon's Souls was first announced in early October 2008 through that week's issue of Famitsu, with the game being playable at the Tokyo Game Show (TGS) the following week. Reaction to the TGS demo was described by Kajii as "nothing short of a disaster" due to its unexpectedly challenging nature. Many people assumed the game's combat was still in development, with Kajii lamenting that the game was unsuited for a demo environment. Sony president Shuhei Yoshida was also dismissive of the game. When he play-tested it, he spent two hours playing the game and failed to get beyond the starting area. Believing it to be simply poor quality, he called it "an unbelievably bad game".

Demon's Souls released in Japan on February 5, 2009, by Sony Computer Entertainment Japan. Due to negative feedback from Sony staff and the Japanese press, Sony decided against localizing the game for Western markets, a decision Sony and Yoshida in particular later regretted. Sony did create an English text version of the game for the Asian market. This version was translated by Active Gaming Media. The Chinese language version was released on February 26.

The game's voice acting was in English for all versions. Due to its Medieval European setting, the team decided against using American English actors, asking Sony to handle that aspect. Most of the actors were Scottish. The game was again localized from Japanese to English by Active Gaming Media. Active Gaming Media's James Mountain was the game's primary translator. He tried to translate and localize the dialogue as naturally as possible. While he didn't see art or video assets from the game until "rather far" into the localization process, he interpreted the game as a "knights, dragons, demons-type action-oriented RPG". A previous, unfinished localization included archaic words such as "thee", "thy", and "thou" mixed with 'very modern' terminology. Mountain found it 'lacking' and revised it. He had no direct contact with the developers, and while he received detailed feedback on his translations of systemic elements (such as item descriptions), his translations of dialogue and other story elements were generally accepted without comment.

The game was licensed for release in North America by Atlus. While Sony was reluctant to license out a game for third-party publishing, it wanted the game to find a suitable niche and first-party publishing was no longer an option. The North American localization mainly addressed "grammar/inaccuracy issues" from the overseas version. Atlus was aware of the game's high difficulty, but was impressed by the game's quality and decided to take it on. Also due to the high difficulty, it planned for conservative sales figures. The game released in North America on October 6, coming in both standard and limited edition.

Before the game's release in the United States, publication in PAL-region territories was made unclear after Sony Computer Entertainment Europe and Atlus announced that they both had no plans to publish the game. On April 16, 2010, Namco Bandai Partners, a subsidiary of Namco Bandai Games, signed an agreement deal with Sony Computer Entertainment to allow the former to distribute and publish the title in PAL territories. The European version came in standard and limited editions. The game was released across PAL territories, including Europe and Australia, on June 25.

The North American servers for Demon's Souls were originally planned for shutdown in October 2011, two years after the game's release in the region. Atlus decided a month before to keep the servers running until May the following year. Later, after unspecified new developments, Atlus announced that it would keep the servers running "indefinitely". They were finally discontinued worldwide in February 2018. Their discontinuation meant the end of multiplayer functionality, messaging, and the World Tendency mechanics. A few months after the servers went offline, a group of fans created a private server which restored all online functions.

== Reception ==
Reception

Aggregate score
Aggregator	Score
Metacritic	89/100

Review scores
Publication	Score
1Up.com	A
Edge	9/10
Eurogamer	9/10
Famitsu	29/40
Game Informer	9/10
GamePro	4/5
GameSpot	9/10
GamesRadar+	9/10
GameTrailers	8.9/10
GameZone	9.4/10
IGN	9.4/10
Official U.S. PlayStation Magazine	8/10
PALGN	9/10
VideoGamer.com	9/10

Edit on Wikidata

Upon its release in Japan, Demon's Souls was generally well received by critics. Dengeki scored the game 95/85/85/85, adding up to 350 out of 400, saying that "fans of old-school games will shed tears of joy." Famitsu gave it 29 out of 40 (9/7/7/6), with an editor Paint Yamamoto scoring it a 9 and calling it "a game you learn how to play by losing – you'll face sudden death frequently. But! Keep playing... and you'll realize how deep it really is." However, another editor, Maria Kichiji, gave it a 6 and found the game to be "far too stoic... it's not a game for everybody."

Upon release in North America, the game received critical acclaim with an average critic score of 89/100 at Metacritic. Despite the game's high difficulty, many reviewers found it to be a positive aspect, making the game more rewarding to play. GameSpot called the high difficulty "fair", saying players will "undoubtedly take a lot of damage until you learn the subtleties of fighting each enemy, but combat feels just right." IGN echoed this view, saying that players who "can remember the good ol' days when games taught through the highly effective use of negative reinforcement and a heavy price for not playing it carefully should scoop this up instantly." Game Informer called it "one of the first truly great Japanese RPGs of this generation, and certainly the most remarkable." Official U.S. PlayStation Magazine however, while commending the game overall, said Demon's Souls was "best left to the most masochistic, hardcore gamer."

GameZone commented on the online aspect as being "innovative" and "perfectly blended into the game", while Game Revolution felt it "turns a solitary experience into a surprisingly communal one." On the technical and design side GamesRadar called it "graphically stunning, too, looking more like the old Ultima games than anything that’s ever come out of Japan," while GameTrailers said the game "nails the dark fantasy look" along with what they considered "music from actual instruments", although they mentioned certain issues with the physics engine being "jittery". Shortly after its North American release, ScrewAttack named Demon's Souls as the eighth best PS3 exclusive to date.

Prior to the game's release in Europe, European critics reviewed import copies. Writing for Eurogamer, journalist Keza MacDonald said: "Precisely because the odds are so stacked against you, precisely because the game sometimes seems to hate you with every fibre of its being, when you do finally kill the...boss monster that ended you within half a minute the first time you approached it, the resulting heart-in-mouth euphoria is the purest kind of gaming thrill." Edge explained their positive view on the difficulty by stating, "If gaming’s ultimate appeal lies in the learning and mastering of new skills, then surely the medium’s keenest thrills are to be found in its hardest lessons", concluding, "For those who flourish under Demon’s Souls’ strict examination, there's no greater sense of virtual achievement."

=== Sales ===
During its first week on sale, Demon's Souls debuted at second place in the charts with over 39,000 units sold, coming in behind the previous week's top-seller Tales of the World: Radiant Mythology 2. The game sold through 95% of its shipment during its debut, selling out in several stores. According to Miyazaki, initial sales for Demon's Souls were slow in Japan, which combined with negative reactions from trade shows made the team fearful that the game would be a failure. However, positive word of mouth eventually allowed the game to sell over 100,000 copies, which the team considered a success. It sold 134,585 copies in Japan by December 2009.

Atlus had estimated the game's sales at 75,000 units, only preparing initial shipments of 15,000 units before positive word of mouth and critical acclaim caused sales to take off. In North America, the game was the eleventh best-selling title during its month of release, posting sales of 150,000 units. By March 2010, the game had sold 250,000 copies in North America. According to Atlus, the game sold triple their original estimates by April 2010. During their fiscal year report, Atlus' parent company Index Corporation reported profits of over $3 million. This was almost entirely attributed to the commercial success of Demon's Souls. In September 2010, Atlus announced that Demon's Souls would be released in North America under the Sony Greatest Hits label with a price cut following strong sales, higher than previously expected by the publisher. Its status indicated regional sales of over 500,000 units.

In the United Kingdom, the game's special edition sold out very fast apart from "dribs and drabs". This was classed as a success by Namco Bandai Partners, particularly due to the long delay between the North American and European releases. While units sold did not reach hundreds of thousands at the time, Namco Bandai were confident in the game's future commercial success. Demon's Souls favorable review scores made the fiscal performance of the game unique because of the lack of a supporting marketing campaign. Gaming analyst Jesse Divnich commented "Demon's Souls is probably one of the most statistically relevant games released in the gaming world as it helps answer an often asked question: how much would a high quality game sell if it was supported by no mass marketing, released by a little known publisher, and was a new intellectual property." As of 2011, the game has sold over one million copies worldwide.

=== Awards ===
In their 2009 Best and Worst Awards, GameSpot awarded Demon's Souls with Overall Game of the Year, Best PS3 game, Best Role-Playing game and Best Original Game Mechanic for the online integration. GameTrailers awarded it Best RPG and Best New intellectual property. IGN also awarded the game Best RPG for the PS3. X-Play awarded the multiplayer Best Gameplay Innovation. PC World awarded it Game of the Year. RPGamer awarded Demon's Souls RPG of the Year 2009, including Best Graphics and Best PS3 RPG. In 2015, Edge ranked the game 20th on their list of the greatest video games of all time. At the 13th Annual Interactive Achievement Awards, Demon's Souls was nominated for "Role-Playing/Massively Multiplayer Game of the Year" and "Outstanding Innovation in Gaming".

== Legacy ==
Demon's Souls has been cited as one of the greatest games of all time. It is noted as the first game of the Soulslike subgenre. Its success sparked a number of spiritual successors with similar gameplay by FromSoftware including Dark Souls, Bloodborne, and Elden Ring, which are also considered among the greatest games of all time. It is cited as an influence on The Witcher series, Journey, and Nioh, as well as features of the PlayStation 4.

A remake by Bluepoint Games for the PlayStation 5 was announced at the console's reveal event in June 2020. Production on the remake began following completion of the studio's 2018 remake of Shadow of the Colossus. Demon's Souls released as a launch title for the console on November 12, 2020.
