= Bass Rise =

1999 video game

- Developer: BEC
- Publisher: Bandai
- Platform: PlayStation
- Release: JP: March 25, 1999; NA: November 1999
- Genre: Sports (Fishing)
- Modes: Single-player, multiplayer

Bass Rise, known in Japan as Fishing Freaks: BassRise (フィッシングフリークス バスライズ, Fisshingu Furīkusu BasuRaisu), is a fishing video game developed by BEC and published by Bandai for PlayStation in 1999.

== Reception ==
Reception

Aggregate score
Aggregator	Score
GameRankings	60%

Review scores
Publication	Score
Electronic Gaming Monthly	6/10
Famitsu	30/40
Game Informer	4/10
GamePro	3.5/5
GameSpot	5/10
IGN	5.5/10
Official U.S. PlayStation Magazine	3/5
PlayStation: The Official Magazine	3.5/5

The game received mixed reviews according to the review aggregation website GameRankings. In Japan, however, Famitsu gave it a score of 30 out of 40.
