= Agetec =

American video game publisher

Agetec Inc.
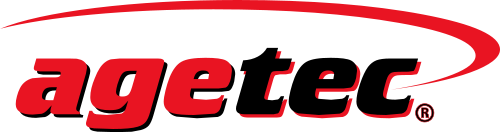
- Type: Video game developer and publisher
- Industry: Video games
- Predecessor: ASCII Corporation
- Founded: 1998; 28 years ago
- Defunct: 2018; 8 years ago
- Headquarters: Sunnyvale, California, United States

Agetec Inc. ("ASCII Game Entertainment Technology") was an American video game publishing company that was best known for bringing Japanese titles to the United States.

Notable games published by Agetec include R-Type Delta, Armored Core series, and the King's Field series, as well as the "designer series" RPG Maker and Fighter Maker. Other titles Magic Pengel and Cookie & Cream, the best selling fishing titles Bass Landing and Fisherman's Bass Club, Disaster Report and its sequel, Raw Danger!. Their last published title was Touch Battle Ninja for the Nintendo 3DS, released in 2014.

== History ==
The company was formed through ASCII Corporation, spinning off their American distribution subsidiary as an independent corporation in 1998, and became a standalone publisher one year later. ASCII announced that Agetec will handle game publishing for the North American and European markets from April 2000.

Around approximately May 2018, all Agetec titles for Nintendo platforms were delisted from the Nintendo eShop in North America. Also around this time, their web site became a "server default" page. These events indicate the company has quietly become defunct.

== Games published ==
Year	Title	Developer	Platform(s)
1999	R-Type Delta	Irem	PlayStation
1999	Fighter Maker	ASCII Entertainment	PlayStation
1999	Echo Night	FromSoftware	PlayStation
1999	Bass Landing	ASCII Corporation	PlayStation
1999	Rising Zan: The Samurai Gunman	UEP Systems	PlayStation
1999	Clock Tower II: The Struggle Within	Human Entertainment	PlayStation
1999	Shadow Tower	FromSoftware	PlayStation
2000	RPG Maker	Kuusoukagaku Corporation	PlayStation
2000	Bust-A-Move 4	Taito	Microsoft Windows
2000	Armored Core: Master of Arena	FromSoftware	PlayStation
2000	The King of Fighters: Evolution	SNK Corporation	Dreamcast
2000	Space Marauder	Kid Corporation	Game Boy Color
2000	Lil' Monster	Kid Corporation	Game Boy Color
2000	Virtua Athlete 2000	Climax Entertainment, Sega Hitmaker	Dreamcast
2000	Eternal Ring	FromSoftware	PlayStation 2
2000	Evergrace	FromSoftware	PlayStation 2
2000	Armored Core 2	FromSoftware	PlayStation 2
2001	Bowling	Tamsoft	PlayStation
2001	Chess	Success	PlayStation
2001	The King of Fighters '99: Millennium Battle	SNK Corporation	PlayStation
2001	Bass Landing 2	Tose	PlayStation
2001	Puzzle Star Sweep	Axela	PlayStation
2001	Strikers 1945	Psikyo	PlayStation
2001	Metal Slug X	SNK Corporation	PlayStation
2001	The Adventures of Cookie & Cream	FromSoftware	PlayStation 2
2001	The Last Blade 2	SNK Corporation	Dreamcast
2001	Crossroad Crisis	Success Corporation	PlayStation
2001	Armored Core 2: Another Age	FromSoftware	PlayStation 2
2001	Panzer Front	ASCII Corporation, Soyuz	PlayStation
2001	Putter Golf	Amedio	PlayStation
2001	Garou: Mark of the Wolves	SNK Corporation	Dreamcast
2002	Forever Kingdom	FromSoftware	PlayStation 2
2002	All-Star Slammin' D-Ball	Access	PlayStation
2002	King's Field: The Ancient City	FromSoftware	PlayStation 2
2002	Fisherman's Bass Club	Vingt-et-un Systems Corporation	PlayStation 2
2002	RC Helicopter	Tomcat System	PlayStation
2002	Rageball	Na.p.s., Team s.n.c.	PlayStation
2002	Armored Core 3	FromSoftware	PlayStation 2
2002	Disaster Report	Irem	PlayStation 2
2003	Phix: The Adventure	Affect	PlayStation
2003	Big League Slugger Baseball	Now Production	PlayStation
2003	Street Racquetball	Highwaystar	PlayStation
2003	Magic Pengel: The Quest for Color	Garakuta Studio, Taito	PlayStation 2
2003	Space Channel 5	United Game Artists	PlayStation 2
2003	Silent Line: Armored Core	FromSoftware	PlayStation 2
2004	Volleyball Xciting	Art Co. Ltd	PlayStation 2
2004	Echo Night: Beyond	FromSoftware	PlayStation 2
2004	Armored Core: Nexus	FromSoftware	PlayStation 2
2004	Kuon	FromSoftware	PlayStation 2
2005	Armored Core: Nine Breaker	FromSoftware	PlayStation 2
2005	RPG Maker 3	Enterbrain	PlayStation 2
2005	Wild Arms Alter Code: F	Media.Vision Entertainment	PlayStation 2
2005	PoPoLoCrois	G-artists, Sony Computer Entertainment	PlayStation Portable
2005	Armored Core: Formula Front	FromSoftware	PlayStation Portable
2006	Armored Core: Last Raven	FromSoftware	PlayStation 2
2007	Brain Buster Puzzle Pak	Agetec, Nikoli	Nintendo DS
2007	Raw Danger!	Irem	PlayStation 2
2007	Cookie & Cream	FromSoftware	Nintendo DS
2007	Rhythm 'n Notes	IE Institute; Success	Nintendo DS
2007	Fire Pro Wrestling Returns	S-NEO, Y'sK	PlayStation 2
2008	Touch Darts	Full Fat Productions	Nintendo DS
2008	DT Carnage	Axis Entertainment	PlayStation 2
2008	LOL	Route24, Skip Ltd.	Nintendo DS
2008	Fading Shadows	Ivolgamus	PlayStation Portable
2008	Falling Stars	Ivolgamus	PlayStation 2
2009	SilverStar Chess	SilverStarJapan	Wii
2009	SilverStar Reversi	SilverStarJapan	Wii
2009	Way of the Samurai 3	Acquire	PlayStation 3
2010	Mahjong Solitaire	Agetec	PlayStation 3, PlayStation Portable, PS Vita
2010	Paul's Shooting Adventure	ICM	Nintendo DSi
2010	Go Fetch!	ICM	Nintendo DSi
2010	Paul's Monster Adventure	ICM	Nintendo DSi
2011	Treasure Hunter X	SilverStarJapan	Nintendo DSi
2011	Rabi Laby	SilverStarJapan	Nintendo DSi
2011	Whack-A-Friend	ICM	Nintendo DSi
2011	Zimo: Mahjong Fanatic	Agetec	Nintendo DSi
2011	Roller Angels	Starfish Inc.(ja)	Nintendo DSi
2011	Kung Fu Dragon	SilverStarJapan	Nintendo DSi
2011	Go Fetch! 2	ICM	Nintendo DSi
2011	Magical Whip: Wizards of the Phantasmal Forest	SilverStarJapan	Nintendo DSi
2011	DotMan	SilverStarJapan	Nintendo DSi
2011	Break Tactics	SilverStarJapan	Nintendo DSi
2012	Quick Fill Q	SilverStarJapan	Nintendo DSi
2012	Paul's Shooting Adventure 2	ICM	Nintendo DSi
2012	The Phantom Thief Stina and 30 Jewels	SilverStarJapan	Nintendo 3DS
2012	Rabi Laby 2	SilverStarJapan	Nintendo DSi
2012	Touch Battle Tank: 3D	SilverStarJapan	Nintendo 3DS
2013	Air Battle Hockey 3D	SilverStarJapan	Nintendo 3DS
2013	Witch's Cat	SilverStarJapan	Nintendo 3DS
2013	Bloody Vampire	SilverStarJapan	Nintendo 3DS
2013	Fish On 3D	SIMS	Nintendo 3DS
2014	Touch Battle Tank: 3D 2	SilverStarJapan	Nintendo 3DS
2014	Rabi Laby 3	SilverStarJapan	Nintendo 3DS
2014	Touch Battle Ninja	SilverStarJapan	Nintendo 3DS
