= King's Field (1995 video game) =

1995 video game

King's Field II
- Japanese box art
- Developer: FromSoftware
- Publishers: JP: FromSoftware; NA: ASCII Entertainment; EU: Sony Computer Entertainment
- Producer: Naotoshi Zin
- Programmer: Eiichi Hasegawa
- Writers: Toshiya Kimura; Shinichiro Nishida
- Composers: Koji Endo; Kaoru Kono
- Series: King's Field
- Platform: PlayStation
- Release: JP: July 21, 1995; NA: February 14, 1996; EU: March 10, 1997
- Genre: Action role-playing
- Mode: Single-player

King's Field II (Note: Kingusu Fīrudo Tsū (キングスフィールドII)) is a 1995 action role-playing game developed and published by FromSoftware for the PlayStation. It is the second entry in the King's Field series and the first one to be released internationally; it was released as simply King's Field as the previous game was never released outside Japan.

== Story ==
Screenshot showing the game's first-person interface and combat system.

The game takes place on the island of Melanat. The player takes the role of Granitiki prince Aleph (アレフ・ガルーシャ・レグナス) (alternatively named Alef/Alexander), who has taken it upon himself, as one of the king of Verdite's closest friends, to retrieve the holy sword known as the Moonlight Sword, and return it to King Alfred of the kingdom of Verdite. Aleph is washed up on the coast of Melanat, as the sole survivor after the ship he came with sank into the ocean. To find the Moonlight Sword, Aleph must press ever forward and uncover the secrets the dark island of Melanat holds.

== Reception ==
Reception

Aggregate score
Aggregator	Score
GameRankings	82%

Review scores
Publication	Score
AllGame	4.5/5
Electronic Gaming Monthly	8.375 / 10
Famitsu	35 / 40
Next Generation	4/5
Dengeki PlayStation	90/100, 85/100, 80/100, 90/100

On release, the Japanese gaming magazine Famicom Tsūshin scored the game a 35 out of 40. One of Electronic Gaming Monthly's four reviewers remarked, "This title has all the great aspects of a true RPG, including items to pick up and equip, but also has an adventure feel to it because of the strategy used in doing battle with the enemies." Though one of the reviewers complained about the player character's slow movement, another two felt it added to the realism. A GamePro reviewer took the negative side on the issue, arguing that "Chasing monsters is one thing, but chasing them in slow motion while they speed up to kill you is a different matter." He also criticized the slowly charging weapon bar and the graphical similarity of the levels and monsters, and compared the game unfavorably to DeathKeep, another first-person dungeon crawling RPG which was released for the 3DO at around the same time. A Next Generation critic complained that the battles "are slow and meticulous, and ... lack a lot of the strategy involved in most RPG battles", but gave the game a strong overall recommendation. He complimented the graphics, sound, and RPG elements, but found the game's best aspect as the ability to freely look around and explore every corner of the massive 3D world with no load times.

In a retrospective review AllGame editor Michael L. House highly praised the game, referring to it as an "exceptional sequel" and that "experiencing the magic of this wonderful game would be time well spent".
