= Arnstein (personal name) =

Arnstein is a surname and a given name. Notable people with the name include:

== Surname ==
- Benedikt Arnstein (1765–1841), Austrian dramatist
- Fanny von Arnstein (1758–1818), Austrian baroness and leader of society in Vienna
- Holly Blake-Arnstein (born 1985), singer from Dream, American pop girl group
- Ira B. Arnstein (born Itzig Arenstein April 12, 1879 - September 13, 1956) was a musical composer, songwriter, and "chronic litigator."
- Karl Arnstein (1887–1974), Czech-American aviation engineer
- Margaret Arnstein (1904–1972), American nursing and public health advocate
- Nicky Arnstein (1879–1965), American professional gambler and con artist
- Sherry Arnstein (1930–1997), American public servant, an author of influential papers in participatory decision making

== Given name ==
- Arnstein Aassve (born June 19, 1968) is a Norwegian professor in demography
- Arnstein Arneberg (1882 – 1961), Norwegian architect
- Arnstein Johansen (1925 – 2013), Norwegian accordionist
- Arnstein Finset (born 8 July 1947) is a Norwegian medical psychologist
- Arnstein Finstad (born 1978), Norwegian cross-country skier
- Arnstein Øverkil (1937 – 2014), Norwegian police chief and civil servant

== See also ==
- Aronstein
- Ornstein
- Orenstein
- Gorenstein
- Hornstein (surname)
