= Sen's Fortress =

Video game level

- The portcullis of Sen's Fortress in its raised position, allowing entry to the level.
- First appearance: Dark Souls (2011)
- Last appearance: Dark Souls Remastered (2018)
- Created by: Hidetaka Miyazaki, Masanori Waragai
- Genre: Action role-playing game

Sen's Fortress is a fictional fortress and video game level that first appears in the FromSoftware-developed action role-playing game Dark Souls, and returns in the 2018 Dark Souls Remastered. Described in-game as a "deadly house of traps", it guards the entrance to the city of the gods, Anor Londo, from intruders, while also having served as an ancient "proving grounds" for the Silver Knights, the army of Lord Gwyn. The player encounters the fortress early on, but can only access it around the mid-point of the game.

Sen's Fortress was described as one of the most difficult levels in Dark Souls by many critics, and its obstacle course-like design was lauded for its complexity and challenge. There has been critical debate over whether the level is unfair, though the game's director, Hidetaka Miyazaki, has stated that all the level's traps were given environmental clues that would allow diligent players to avoid them.

== Level content ==
Sen's Fortress can be accessed roughly before the mid point of the game, after the player character rings two "Bells of Awakening" and causes the giant guarding the fortress's gates to open them. The first and most challenging section of the level introduces the player to its unique elements - such as pressure plates that trigger arrow traps, powerful snakemen and lightning-shooting snake-women, and platforming sections that force the player to dodge large, swinging axe blades. If the player falls off the catwalk and survives, they become stuck in the tar beneath the fortress and must also contend with powerful Titanite Demons.

Following the first two catwalks, the player is then forced to dodge boulders, before being able to turn a lever and reroute them. The player may also run into the game's first Mimic. After two, more difficult catwalks, the player emerges onto the roof, where they must dodge firebombs thrown by a giant located at the fortress's highest point. After a hidden save point, the player can access an area guarded by the undead Prince Ricard. At the end of the level, they must fight a boss called the Iron Golem, which is generally seen as easier than the fortress itself.

== Development ==
The "gauntlet" like lore and design of Sen's Fortress ostensibly allowed the game's designers to "drop the pretense of fair play" and place traps in a "sadistic" way without the necessity to make thematic sense. The traps were designed to appear obvious and part of a trial to reach Anor Londo. The steps inside the fortress are worn away where boulders roll down them, an idea thought of by Miyazaki to warn "diligent" players about where a boulder could roll down.

== Reception ==
The "imposing" appearance of Sen's Fortress was cited by Matthew Elliott of GamesRadar+ as "intrigu[ing] and intimidat[ing]", as well as making the player's entrance to Anor Londo extremely rewarding. Chris Dahlen of Kotaku lauded the level as containing "almost every design decision that makes Dark Souls great". Joe Donnelly of PC Gamer described the level as his "favorite gamification of Mouse Trap", calling it the "ultimate challenge", and said that he regularly revisits the level and beats it just to prove that he can. Comparing defeating each of the Serpent Soldiers to "a complete roll of the dice", he stated that finishing the level made him a "momentary champion". In You Died, Jason Killingsworth wrote that "Sen’s background lore allows the game’s designers to completely drop the pretense of fair play and be as sadistic as they please", equating it to a Rube Goldberg machine or a "grimdark obstacle course".

Sen's Fortress was praised in Shacknews as "the pinnacle of Dark Souls level design" and "the archetypal Dungeons & Dragons campaign" in which there is no "long-winded" story or exposition, but rather a battle of wits against booby traps. It was also lauded for its "remarkable sense of place", and was called the Souls franchise's "cream of the crop" with regards to its progression and environmental cues. Ian Boudreau of PCGamesN said that "Sen's Fortress is the first real hint that there's some deliberate cruelty involved", calling the level a repudiation of the idea that the game is "firm but fair".
