= Orenstein =

There are several notable people with the surname Orenstein.

- Alexander Jeremiah Orenstein, South African medical scientist and army general
- Arbie Orenstein, American musicologist, author, academic and pianist
- Benjamin Orenstein, Polish Holocaust survivor
- Bernie Orenstein, Canadian-American actor, television producer and screenwriter
- Gloria Feman Orenstein, feminist art critic
- Henry Orenstein, American poker player and entrepreneur
- Henry Orenstein (painter), Canadian artist
- Howard Orenstein, American lawyer and politician
- Israel Orenstein, Ukrainian-born Jewish novelist
- Joan Orenstein, Canadian actress
- Leo Orenstein, Canadian television producer and director
- Nadine Orenstein, American art historian and curator
- Norman Orenstein, Canadian composer, record producer, and musician
- Peggy Orenstein, American writer
- Sylvia Orenstein, World Health Organization analyst who devoted the last decades of her life to researching and writing about the JFK assassination
- Toby Orenstein, American theatrical director, producer, and educator
- Walter Orenstein, American vaccinologist
- Yitzhak Avigdor Orenstein, Israeli politician
- Zigu Ornea (born Orenstein or Ornstein), Romanian cultural historian
- Brigitta P. Kovarskaia (born Brigitta P. Orenstein; 1930–1998) Soviet Moldovan historian, physicist, computer scientist, and educator

== See also ==
- Orenstein and Koppel
- Amy Foxx-Orenstein
- Ornstein
