= Ornstein and Smough =

Dark Souls characters

- Dark Souls characters
- In-game render of Dragon Slayer Ornstein (left) and Executioner Smough (right)
- First appearance: Dark Souls (2011)
- Created by: Hidetaka Miyazaki
- Designed by: Hiroshi Nakamura

In-universe information
- Full name: Dragon Slayer Ornstein; Executioner Smough
- Occupation: Knight (Ornstein); Executioner (Smough)
- Home: Anor Londo

Ornstein and Smough are a fictional duo of armored warriors from the 2011 action role-playing game Dark Souls, developed by FromSoftware and directed by Hidetaka Miyazaki.

Independently known as Dragon Slayer Ornstein, one of the Four Knights of Gwyn and a former hunter of dragons, and Executioner Smough, an executioner of superhuman size, the two warriors were assigned to protect the city of Anor Londo, its resident goddess Princess Gwynevere, and a powerful magical object known as the Lordvessel from intruders. They are mentioned in the lore of every game in the series, but are predominantly known for their appearance in the series' initial game as an asymmetrical boss fight considered one of the game's most difficult, as well as one of the most memorable fights in gaming.

== Characteristics ==
Ornstein and Smough possess vastly different physical traits. Ornstein is a thin and agile knight who fights with a cross-spear, imbued with magical lightning to pierce the hides of dragons. He was commended by the gods for his bravery in battle, as evidenced by his high rank. Smough is significantly taller and larger than Ornstein, suggesting that he is a giant, and wields a cruder armament. While his armor depicts a proportionally tiny head, it is implied in concept art that it does not reflect his actual physique, with Smough's true face situated in the neck area. Smough's armor is based on that of a sumo wrestler, his name transliterating to "Sumou", and requires immense strength to wear. He also lacks a weakness to dark magic, unlike other denizens of Anor Londo. While initially designed to also be a knight, Hidetaka Miyazaki chose a more "heretical" role in order to suit Smough's design.

Both of the characters are fought in a long, rectangular and empty cathedral, with parallel sets of pillars on either side. The player can either attempt to block Smough with the pillars while attacking Ornstein, or attack Smough while dodging Ornstein, a more difficult task when alone. If Ornstein is defeated first, Smough crushes him with his hammer, and gains the power of lightning. If Smough is defeated first, Ornstein suddenly grows to immense size while retaining his former speed. When the second boss is defeated, the player can purchase the armor of that boss, and in Ornstein's case, obtains the Leo Ring.

A boss identical to Ornstein appears in Dark Souls II, called the "Old Dragonslayer", although this fight has been criticized as a "carbon copy" that lacked creativity. Ornstein's spear can be created from the soul of the Old Dragonslayer, and the boss drops the Old Leo Ring, though no other items related to the duo appear in Dark Souls II. The armor and weapons of both Ornstein and Smough, as well as the Leo Ring, return as usable equipment in Dark Souls III.

== Fictional biography ==
Dragon Slayer Ornstein is a member of the Four Knights of Gwyn, an elite personal guard to Lord Gwyn, the primary god of the Dark Souls universe. Loyal to Gwyn since the dawn of the Age of Fire, he has an elemental affinity with lightning, which he used to slay dragons using his cross spear weapon. He shows respect for Smough, calmly absorbing his soul if Smough is defeated.

Executioner Smough is an indiscriminate executioner with immense physical strength, though his psychological instability and cannibalistic tendencies prevented him from ever being truly inducted into the Knights of Gwyn. Smough is also disliked by Kingseeker Frampt, a primordial serpent and close friend of Lord Gwyn, who only offers a single soul in exchange for feeding him the Soul of Smough.

When the gods fled Anor Londo, both warriors saw it as an immense honor to guard Gwynevere, daughter of Lord Gwyn and Queen of Sunlight, unaware of the fact that she was an illusion.

== Development ==
The name of Dragon Slayer Ornstein was likely based on the composer Leo Ornstein. Smough's armor was designed to appear as though it was created by a demented person, reflecting his personality, and he was designed first, with Ornstein being introduced much later in development. Creator Hidetaka Miyazaki forced the game's designers and programmers to make Smough's armor a player-equippable reward, making them "really angry".

Alex Wiltshire of Kotaku noted that Smough suffers from a bug to his weapon's hitbox, in which his weapon can still deal damage after the mid-boss cutscene starts and Smough moves to a different location, which has resulted in the deaths of the characters of speedrunners. The bug went unfixed in Dark Souls Remastered.

== Reception ==
Several critics consider the Ornstein and Smough encounter to be one of the most memorable and significant boss fights in video games. IGN staff ranked it number 15 in their list of the most unforgettable video game moments of all time, with Chiloi Rad calling it the "singularly defining encounter in the whole of the first Dark Souls". Chris Carter of Destructoid concurred, noting he was not initially prepared for the challenge and was forced to retreat after he realized that Ornstein became larger upon Smough's defeat, eventually prevailing over the bosses in the reverse order after a "soul draining" encounter. GamesRadar+ called the fight the third best in the entire Dark Souls series, behind Sif and Knight Artorias, stating that it induced a "roller coaster of emotions" that was "the Dark Souls experience distilled into one fight". Joe Donnelly of PC Gamer also called the duo one of the best Dark Souls bosses, and "one of the series' most epic showdowns", adding that "my own inability to topple them keeps me coming back for more". Joseph Allen of TechRaptor stated that the Ornstein and Smough fight was "the first time I sat up and took Dark Souls seriously", describing it as "objectively not fair". He praised their design, saying that "players can learn so much about Ornstein and Smough simply by watching how they fight", the game's lore "organically presented to the player". He also praised the ability to summon Knight Solaire for the fight, noting that it "perfectly encapsulates" the game as a whole.

Dave Cook of VG247 called the "feeling of jubilation" when he beat Ornstein and Smough "unmatched in all my years as a gamer", also praising the Dark Souls community for helping him to defeat the bosses. Mark Serrels of Kotaku called the fight "perhaps the most notorious boss battle in Dark Souls", and stated that he felt "pure zen" when he beat it, confident that he was going to win after many repeated attempts. Matthew Byrd of Den of Geek stated that the difficulty of fighting the bosses makes the player question why they must "suffer through a trial that has so clearly been designed to make you overcome unfair odds", saying that they are especially representative of the core appeal of Dark Souls. Derek Swinhart of Game Informer noted that Ornstein and Smough "have become referenced far outside of their origins", adding that the fight "remains challenging and incredibly satisfying years later, and even veteran players can't let their guard down".

Dragonslayer Ornstein was modded into Darkest Dungeon as a playable character by a fan.

=== Unusual control methods ===
Players have beaten Ornstein and Smough using many non-standard control devices, including a Rock Band guitar and drum controller, a Donkey Konga bongo drum controller, and a voice control. Twitch community "Twitch Plays Dark Souls" beat the bosses using a crowd-driven, voting-based text chat system, that allowed the stream's viewers to choose controller inputs.
