= Hornstein (surname) =

Hornstein, Gornstein or Gornshteyn is a Jewish surname. Notable people with the surname include:

- Donald Thomas Hornstein, Professor of Law
- Emily Putnam-Hornstein, American professor of social work
- Frank Hornstein (born 1959), American politician
- Irving L. Gornstein, American lawyer
- Norbert Hornstein, American linguist
- Marty Hornstein (1937–2013), American film producer
- Michal Hornstein (1920–2016), Canadian businessman, art collector and philanthropist
- Michael Hornstein (born 1962), German jazz saxophonist
- Yuda-Leyb Gornshteyn, birth name of Leo Ornstein (1895–2002), Russian-American composer and pianist

== See also ==
- Gorenstein
- Horenstein
- Ornstein
