= Arnstein (disambiguation) =

Arnstein is a town in Bavaria, Germany.

Arnstein may also refer to:

- Arnstein Castle in Arnstein, Bavaria
- Arnstein, Saxony-Anhalt, a town in Saxony-Anhalt, Germany
  - Arnstein Castle in Arnstein, Saxony-Anhalt
- Arnstein Abbey in Rhineland-Palatinate, Germany
  - Arnstein Castle, Rhineland-Palatinate, predecessor of Arnstein Abbey
- Arnstein Castle in Ottendorf, Landkreis Sächsische Schweiz-Osterzgebirge, Saxony
- Arnstein Castle (Austria), 12th-century castle ruins in Austria
- Palais Arnstein, Vienna
- Arnstein Airport, Ontario
- Arnstein (personal name), a surname and a given name
- Sherry Arnstein

== See also ==
- Ornstein
