= Angela Walker =

Angela Walker may refer to:

- Angela Nicole Walker (born 1974), American bus/truck driver, labor organizer, and 2020 Green nominee for Vice President of the United States
- Angela Walker (rhythmic gymnast) (born 1967), New Zealand rhythmic gymnast
- Angela Walker (tennis) (born 1960), Canadian tennis player
- Angela L. Walker Franklin, American academic
- Angela R. Hight Walker, American physicist
