= Star trap =

Star trap may refer to:

- Star trap (trapdoor), a trapdoor used in theatres
- Star Trap, a 1988 UK television film
