= Horenstein =

Gorenstein is an Ashkenazi Jewish surname, a variant of Hornstein. Notable people with the surname include:

- Henry Horenstein, American artist, photographer, filmmaker and educator
- Irving Howe (born Horenstein; 1920–1993), Jewish American literary and social critic
- Jascha Horenstein (1898–1973), Ukrainian-born American conductor
- Mark Horenstein, American electrical engineer

== See also ==
- Gorenstein
