= The World Triathlon =

The World Triathlon consists of a 275-mile (about 442.6 kilometers) swim along the length of the River Thames and across the English Channel, then an 8,875 mile bike ride from Calais, France to Calcutta, India. Next comes a run from Calcutta to the base of Mount Everest (about 950 miles or 1529 kilometers), which will then be attempted to summit. The total distance is about 70 times longer than an Ironman Triathlon. So far, only one man has completed this; Charlie Wittmack, a then 33-year-old Iowan lawyer. Wittmack was also the first Iowan to climb Mount Everest. He is also creating a yearlong school program which will cover geology and other various school subjects, which is being funded by all of the sponsors that have backed him and all the donations he has received. He worked with Des Moines University to promote safe motherhood.
