= Dark Souls: Artorias of the Abyss =

- Promotional artwork featuring Knight Artorias
- Developer: FromSoftware
- Publisher: Namco Bandai Games
- Director: Hidetaka Miyazaki
- Programmer: Jun Ito
- Composer: Motoi Sakuraba
- Series: Dark Souls
- Platforms: PlayStation 3; Xbox 360; Windows; PlayStation 4; Xbox One; Nintendo Switch
- Release: August 24, 2012
- Genre: Action role-playing game

Dark Souls: Artorias of the Abyss is a downloadable content pack for the 2011 action role-playing game Dark Souls. Developed by FromSoftware and published by Namco Bandai Games, it released as part of the Prepare to Die Edition version of the game for Windows in August 2012. The pack was later sold separately for the PlayStation 3 and Xbox 360 versions of the game two months later.

Artorias of the Abyss takes the player centuries into Dark Souls' past, where they must save the land of Oolacile from destruction at the hands of Manus, Father of the Abyss. The pack received positive reviews from critics, who praised the boss battles and additional story and gameplay content.

== Gameplay ==
Dark Souls is an action role-playing game in which the player controls a customized character whose appearance and skills are determined by the player. The game requires the player to explore areas and progress through them by fighting bosses at certain points. Artorias of the Abyss adds a new area, Oolacile, that can be accessed after obtaining the "Broken Pendant" item.

The area includes four bosses and other optional miniboss fights. It also introduces many new weapon and armor items that can then be used in the main game, as well as new shopkeepers and additional upgrade material for the player's weapons. A multiplayer arena was included that allows for more structured PvP and includes online leaderboards.

== Plot ==
Artorias of the Abyss is set centuries before the events of Dark Souls. The player is taken back into the past by a primeval human known as Manus, Father of the Abyss, who was resurrected and tortured by the sorcerers of Oolacile centuries prior, hoping to unlock his dark power. Manus' power went wild and created the Abyss, a dark void that threatens to swallow the entirety of Oolacile. Anor Londo sent Knight Artorias to slay Manus, but he was unable to withstand the dark onslaught due to his lack of Humanity and became possessed himself, only able to save his wolf companion, Sif.

The player, due to their Humanity, is better able to fight off the darkness, and must defeat the possessed Artorias. They must then descend through Oolacile Township and into the Chasm of the Abyss, where they take on Manus and rescue the land's ruler, Princess Dusk. An additional, optional fight involves defeating the black dragon Kalameet that is menacing Oolacile, with the assistance of Hawkeye Gough, a giant archer who was one of the Four Knights of Gwyn.

== Development ==
According to director Hidetaka Miyazaki, there was a removed event in the early development of Dark Souls where you would get summoned to the world of the character Dusk of Oolacile. There was a quest to rescue her in that kingdom after being summoned. The development team scrapped that quickly, thinking "there's no way we can do that!" Dusk of Oolacile was left in the original game as a merchant. The concept was revisited following the release of Artorias of the Abyss, as rescuing Dusk was made a pre-requisite to unlock access to it.

== Reception ==
Reception

Aggregate score
Aggregator	Score
Metacritic	X360: 89/100

Review score
Publication	Score
Eurogamer	9/10

Artorias of the Abyss received generally positive reviews, according to review aggregator Metacritic. Eurogamer rated it 9/10, calling it a "tightly-wound adventure" in which boss fights were the high point, and saying the arena makes it easier to negotiate PvP, but criticizing the team and deathmatch multiplayer modes as hard to find enough players for. Official Xbox Magazine rated it the same, saying that it is for "hardcore players only" and a "fantastic addition to an already great game", calling buying it a "no-brainer" for fans.

Tom McShea of GameSpot stated that the DLC "respected the relationship between developers and players" by presenting a "bonus" that added to the game's depth rather than an "insidious strategy to pad the company's coffers".
