= Daniel Flynn (actor) =

British actor

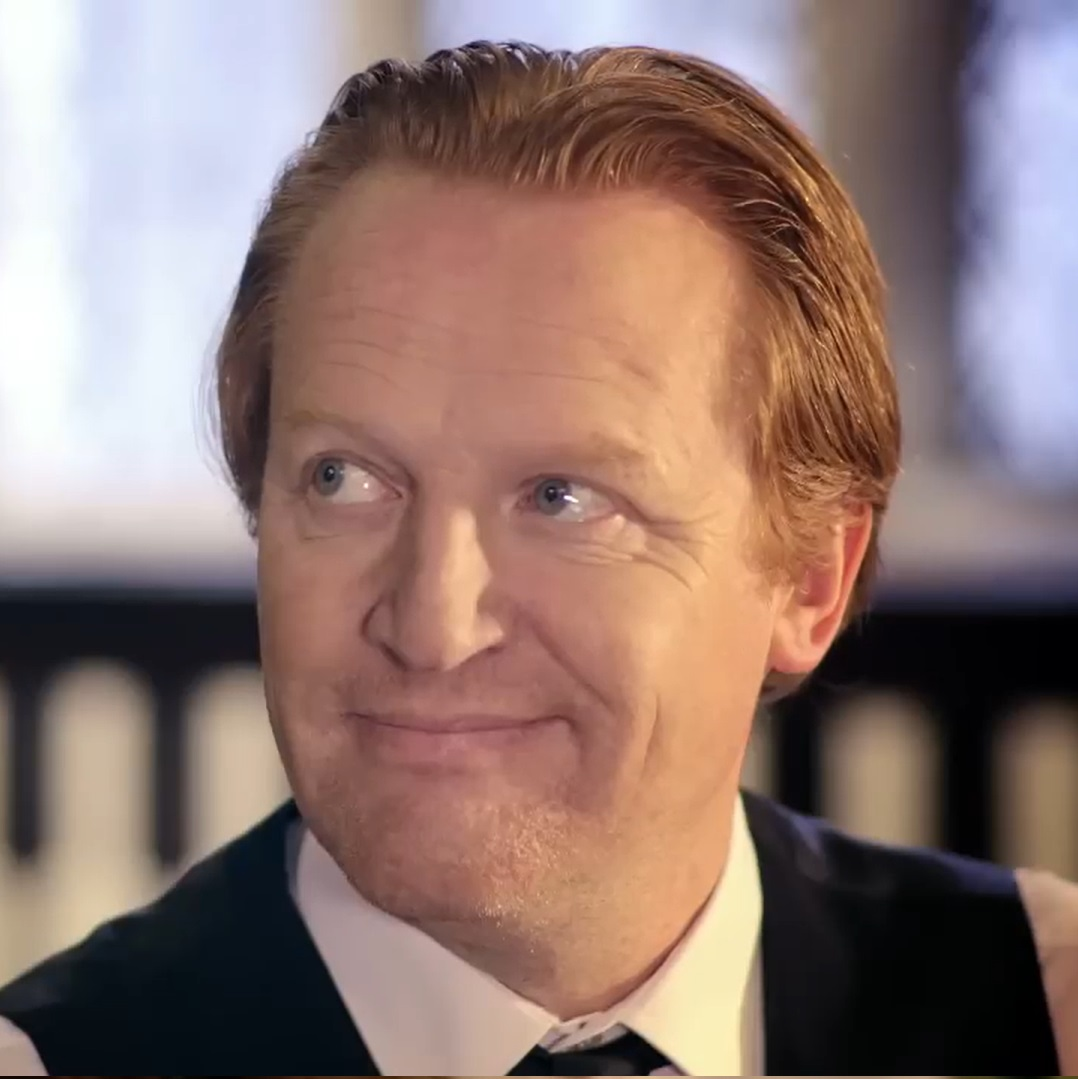
- Flynn in 2013
- Born: 1961 (age 64–65); Evesham, Worcestershire, England
- Occupation: Actor
- Spouse: Serena Evans (m. 1990)
- Children: 2
- Father: Eric Flynn
- Relatives: Jerome Flynn (brother); Johnny Flynn (half-brother)

Daniel Flynn (born 1961) is an English actor. His credits include Biggles: Adventures in Time (1986), The Detectives (1994), Soldier Soldier (1994), Peak Practice (1998), Murder in Mind (2003), William and Mary (2003), Afterlife (2005), The Bill (2006–2009), Solaire of Astora in the 2011 FromSoftware game Dark Souls, Unforgotten (2021), and The Crown (2022).

== Early life ==
Flynn was born in Evesham, Worcestershire, the son of actor Eric Flynn and his wife Fern Warner; the family moved to Bromley, Kent, when he was a baby. He has a brother and sister; his brother is actor Jerome Flynn. He also has a half-brother and sister from his father's second marriage; Johnny Flynn is a musician and actor. Flynn is an alumnus of the Royal Academy of Dramatic Art, graduating in 1982 with an Acting (RADA Diploma).

== Career ==
Flynn has been acting on television since 1983. From 2006 until 2009, he played the role of Superintendent John Heaton in the long-running ITV1 police drama The Bill. He had previously had brief parts in The Bill playing a criminal in the episode "The Assassins" on 20 December 1988 and a Mr. Hemming in "Bringing Up Baby" in January 1993. Flynn's other television credits include Goodbye Mr Chips, The Detectives, The Peter Principle, Soldier Soldier, Peak Practice, Murder in Mind, William and Mary, Afterlife, Star Trap, and Island at War. He also starred as 'Ginger' in the motion picture Biggles: Adventures in Time.

In 2021, he starred as Geoff Tomlinson in six episodes of Unforgotten, and in 2022, he appeared as Andrew Parker Bowles in The Crown.

Flynn has also worked as a voice actor. He supplied the voice of Pak the Banana in the English version of the Spanish animated series The Fruities, and appeared in anime films including Angel Cop (1995), Dark Myth, Cyber City Oedo 808 (1995), and both movies of The Heroic Legend of Arslan (1995). He has voiced numerous video games, including Dark Souls (2011), where he played Solaire of Astora, Vamos the Blacksmith and Giant Blacksmith. He was also Alfred in the game Bloodborne (2015).

== Filmography ==
=== Film ===
Year	Title	Role	Notes
1986	Biggles	Ginger	
2013	All Stars	Additional voice	
2018	Another Day of Life	Queiroz	Voice

=== Television ===
Year	Title	Role	Notes
1983	No Excuses	Billy	4 episodes
1983	The Two Gentlemen of Verona	Servant	Television film
1984	Goodbye Mr. Chips	Terris	2 episodes
1986	The Kit Curran Radio Show	Bob	Episode: "The Street of Shame"
1986	Call Me Mister	Purcell	Episode: "Running Time"
1988	Star Trap	The Detective	Television film
1988–2009	The Bill	Supt. John Heaton	134 episodes
1989	Traffik	Winwood	Episode: "The Addict"
1989	Angel Cop	Tachihara	Episode: "Special Security Force"
1990	The Dark Myth	Brahman	Miniseries
1990–1991	Cyber City Oedo 808	Merrill 'Benten' Yanagawa	3 episodes
1992, 1994	Tokyo Babylon	Seishirô	2 episodes
1993	Heidi	John	2 episodes
1993	Casualty	Dennis	Episode: "Good Friends"
1993	The Buddha of Suburbia	Simon	2 episodes
1993	Dominion	Anchor / Cops	Television short
1993–1995	The Heroic Legend of Arslan	Narsus	4 episodes
1994	The Detectives	Peter Burlington	Episode: "Never Without Protection"
1994	Screen One	Lt. Tim Bryant	Episode: "A Breed of Heroes"
1994	Soldier Soldier	Danny Garvey	2 episodes
1995	The Choir	Roger Farrell	4 episodes
1997	Bugs	Reinhold	Episode: "Fugitive"
1997–2000	The Peter Principle	David Edwards	12 episodes
1998	Peak Practice	Dr. Henry Little	Episode: "All Fall Down"
2003	Murder in Mind	Pete	Episode: "Stalkers"
2003	William and Mary	Martin Owing	Episode #1.3
2004	Island at War	Hauptmann Dieter Muller	6 episodes
2005	The Murder Room	FIO Anderson	Episode #1.1
2005	Afterlife	Donald Bardo	Episode: "Lower Than Bones"
2007	War and Peace	Andrei Nikolayevich Bolkonsky	4 episodes
2009	Leipzig Homicide	Supt. John Heaton	Episode: "Entführung in London"
2009–2010	Mr. Baby	Patrick	48 episodes
2011	Vera	Godfrey Waugh	Episode: "The Crow Trap"
2012	Room at the Top	George Aisgill	Episode #1.1
2012	Young Dracula	Ustrel Bouderon	Episode: "Bootiful Breathers"
2013	The Last Days of Anne Boleyn	Henry VIII	Television film
2014	Line of Duty	News Narrator	Episode: "Carly"
2015	Lewis	Jay Fennell	2 episodes
2015	Holby City	Hugo Featherstone	Episode: "Blue Christmas"
2015, 2018	Father Brown	Daniel Whittaker	2 episodes
2017	Level Up Norge	Vileblood Hunter Alfred	Episode: "Fyll mitt hull: Bloodborne #5"
2021	Unforgotten	Geoff Tomlinson	6 episodes
2022	The Crown	Andrew Parker Bowles	Episode: "The Way Ahead"
