= Ornstein =

Ornstein is a surname of Jewish origin. Notable people with the surname include:

- Anna Ornstein (1927–2025), Hungarian-American Auschwitz survivor, psychoanalyst and psychiatrist
- Axel Ornstein (b. 1952), Swedish chess master
- Donald Samuel Ornstein (born 1934), American mathematician
- Jonathan G. Ornstein, CEO of Mesa Air Group, Inc.
- Leo Ornstein (1895–2002), Russian-American composer
- Leonard Salomon Ornstein (1880–1941), Dutch physicist known for the Ornstein–Zernike equation and the Ornstein–Uhlenbeck process
- Michael Marisi Ornstein (born 1963), American actor
- Norman J. Ornstein (born 1948), American political scientist
- Paul Ornstein (1924–2017), Hungarian-American psychoanalyst and Holocaust survivor
- Robert Ornstein (1942–2018), American psychologist
- Severo Ornstein (born 1930), American computer scientist and son of Leo Ornstein
- Bernadine Dohrn (born 1942) née Ornstein, American activist and lawyer

== In video games ==
- Dragon Slayer Ornstein, an enemy boss in the game Dark Souls.

== See also ==
- Arnstein (disambiguation)
- Orenstein
- Gorenstein
- Hornstein (disambiguation)
