= The Language Myth =

2014 non-fiction book

The Language Myth: Why Language Is Not an Instinct
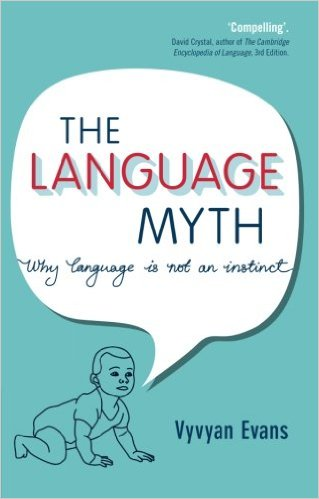
- The Language Myth (first edition)
- Author: Vyvyan Evans
- Language: English
- Genre: Popular science
- Published: 2014
- Publisher: Cambridge University Press
- ISBN: 978-1107619753
- Followed by: The Crucible of Language
- Website: www.vyvevans.net/popular

The Language Myth is a 2014 book by Vyvyan Evans, written for a general audience. It is a direct rebuttal of Steven Pinker's 1994 book The Language Instinct. Evans argues against Noam Chomsky's claim that all human languages provide evidence for an underlying Universal Grammar. Evans posits, instead, a language-as-use thesis to account for the nature of language, how it is learned and how it evolves.

== Reception ==
The Language Myth caused considerable controversy upon publication among supporters of Chomskyan universal grammar. David Adger argued that the "attack on generative linguistics misrepresents the field". Another vocal critic, Norbert Hornstein attacked the book for presenting caricatures of Chomskyan generative grammar and of providing inadequate arguments to support its main claims. Others have attacked the book for its polemical style and what are claimed to be Evans' misunderstandings of Universal Grammar.

Evans responded by claiming that it is exactly critics of the book who misunderstand. He argues that his critics do not provide a coherent argument that is falsifiable as they posit Universal Grammar as a theoretical axiom, which does not require proof or evidence to support it. He also argues that the Universal Grammar perspective makes a claim that is biological rather than linguistic in nature, and hence one that cannot be substantiated on the basis of linguistic evidence.

== Controversy ==
In 2016, Language, the flagship academic journal of the Linguistic Society of America published a series of "Alternative (Re)views" by six leading linguists, all addressing The Language Myth. Evans was originally invited to contribute a response to those articles. However, his submission was rejected by the journal's review editor. Evans wrote an open-letter to the linguistics community claiming that he was being censored.
