= Vyvyan Evans =

British linguistics professor and author (born 1968)

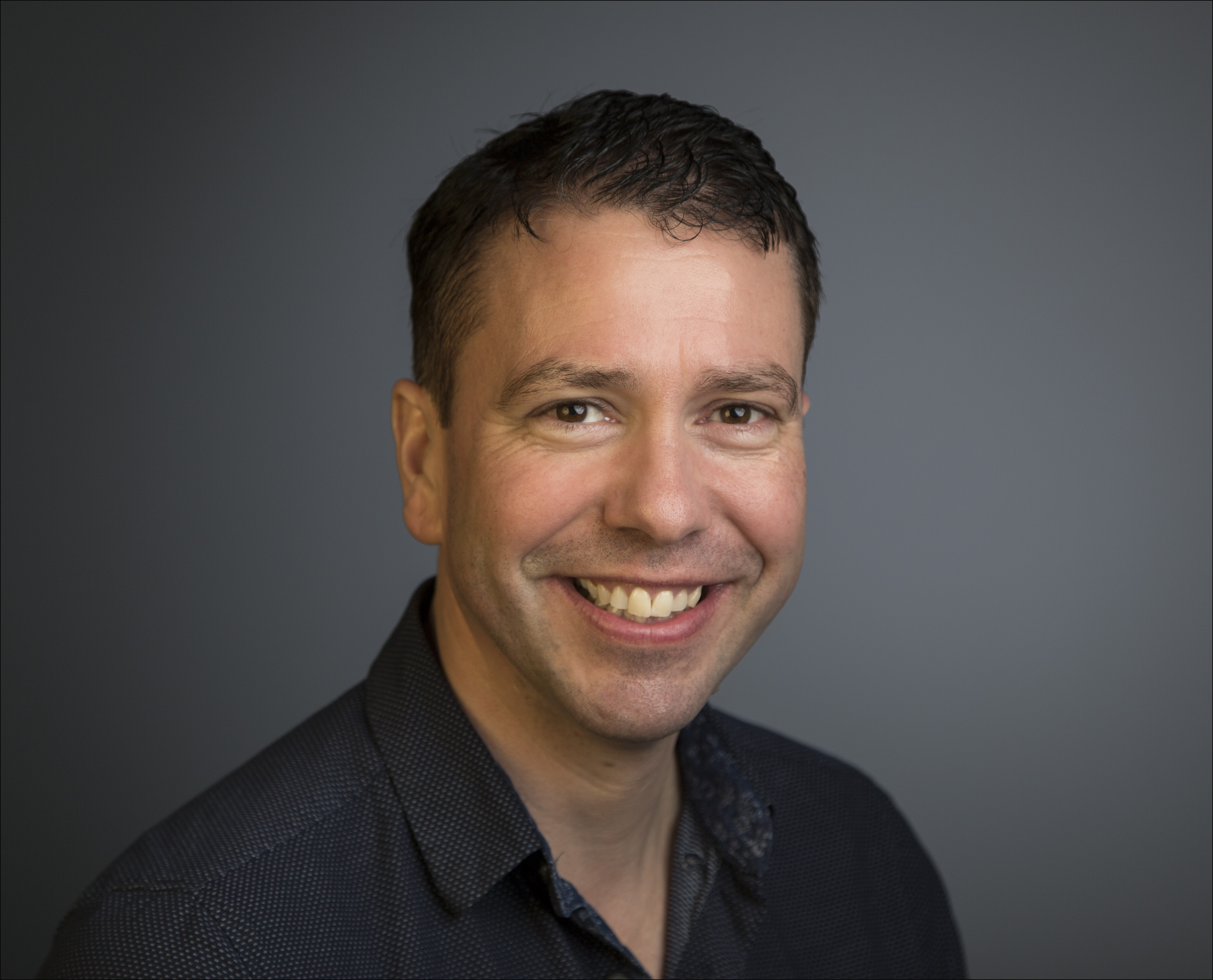
- Born: 23 September 1968 (age 58); Chester, England
- Occupation: Author

Academic background
- Education: Durham University (BA); University of Florida (MA); Georgetown University (Ph.D)
- Thesis: The Structure of Time (2000. Published 2004)
- Doctoral advisor: Andrea Tyler

Academic work
- Discipline: Linguistics
- Institutions: University of Sussex; University of Brighton; Bangor University
- Main interests: Cognitive linguistics, cognitive science, digital communication
- Notable works: The Language Myth; The Emoji Code; The Babel Apocalypse
- Website: www.vyvevans.net

Vyvyan Evans (born 23 September 1968) is a British cognitive linguist, digital communication technologist, popular science author, science fiction author and public intellectual. He has published fifteen books, both non-fiction and fiction. He holds a Ph.D. in Linguistics from Georgetown University. He is an advocate of the usage-based model of language development, the domain-general view of mind, and the importance of non-verbal, paralinguistic cues in communication—the development of emoji as a system of digital communication being a case in point. Evans is also a published science fiction author. His writing envisages a near future in which language is not learned but streamed.

== Education and career ==
=== Education and achievements ===
Evans received his PhD in linguistics from Georgetown University in 2000. During his career he has worked and taught at the University of Sussex, University of Brighton, and Bangor University as a professor of linguistics

In addition, Evans has been instrumental in institutionalizing and developing the field of cognitive linguistics. He founded the UK Cognitive Linguistics Association, with its inaugural conference held at the University of Sussex in 2005. He later served as the President of the UK-CLA for three terms from 2007 to 2014. And he launched the peer-reviewed academic journal Language and Cognition, as its founding General Editor, in 2009. He also initiated what was then the world's first MA in Cognitive Linguistics, in 2003 at Sussex University. Evans is also the author of two textbooks on cognitive Linguistics, the most recent, Cognitive Linguistics: A Complete Guide published in 2019. He has also authored a Glossary of Cognitive Linguistics.

=== Academic specialization ===
Evans' academic specializations relate to lexical and compositional semantics, how language encodes spatial cognition and time, the relationship between lexical and semantic structure, and the development and evolution of language. He has authored four technical books. Two of these, The Semantics of English Prepositions, and The Structure of Time propose a new theory of the way in which words are represented in the mind, known as Principled Polysemy. These books apply this approach to the domains of space and time, respectively. The other two books, How Words Mean, and Language and Time develop and extend Principled Polysemy to create a generalized theory of meaning known as Access Semantics, or the Theory of Lexical Concepts and Cognitive Models (LCCM Theory). These books focus on the way in which language and mind create meaning, and temporal frames of reference respectively.

=== Popular science ===
Evans is the author of three books for a general audience. The Language Myth, published in 2014, presents controversies in the field of linguistics relating to the nature of language and how it is acquired, and was written as a direct rebuttal of Steven Pinker's The Language Instinct. The Language Myth itself was controversial upon publication, and divided opinion, both winning plaudits, and receiving scathing reviews, particularly from supporters of Chomsky's Universal Grammar, against which The Language Myth argues. Some critics took exception to Evans' argument that a Kuhnian paradigm shift was under way in linguistics. One notable critic, Norbert Hornstein, accused Evans of engaging in "junk" science. Another critic, David Adger, claims that Evans' "attack on generative linguistics misrepresents the field."

The Crucible of Language, published in 2015, is a sequel to The Language Myth. The thesis of the book is that language and mind co-create meaning during the course of communication. The book also examines the evolutionary back-story to language. The Emoji Code, published 2017, is the first attempt to apply language science to the emergence of emoji as a system of digital communication. The book argues that emoji fulfils similar functions in digital communication to non-verbal paralinguistic cues found in face to face communication, such as gestures, facial expression and tone of voice. Evans dubs emoji "the body language of the digital age".

=== Science fiction writing ===
Evans is also a science-fiction author. His Songs of the Sage book series envisions a dystopian future in which humans no longer learn language but stream it, using brain implants known as Universal Grammar technology, with catastrophic consequences. The first book in the series is The Babel Apocalypse. The novel earned a prestigious Kirkus star, with a review that described the book as: "A perfect fusion of SF, thriller, and mystery—smart speculative fiction at its very best."

== Bibliography ==
=== Technical books ===
- The Structure of Time: Language, Meaning and Temporal Cognition (2004). John Benjamins Publishing
- The Semantics of English Prepositions: Spatial Scenes, Cognition and Embodied Experience (2003; with Andrea Tyler). Cambridge University Press
- How Words Mean: Lexical Concepts, Cognitive Models and Meaning Construction (2009). Oxford University Press. ISBN 978-0199234677
- Language and Time (2013). Cambridge University Press
- Cognitive Linguistics: A Complete Guide. (2019) Edinburgh University Press

=== Textbooks ===
- Cognitive Linguistics: An Introduction (2006; with Melanie Green). Edinburgh University Press
- Glossary of Cognitive Linguistics (2007). Edinburgh University Press

=== Edited books ===
- New Directions in Cognitive Linguistics (2009). John Benjamins Publishing
- The Cognitive Linguistics Reader (2009; with Benjamin Bergen and Joerg Zinken). Equinox Publishing
- Language, Cognition and Space: The State of the Art and New Directions (2010; with Paul Chilton). Equinox Publishing
- Language Learning, Discourse and Cognition (2018; with Lucy Pickering) John Benjamins Press

=== Popular science books ===
- The Language Myth: Why Language Is Not An Instinct (2014). Cambridge University Press
- The Crucible of Language: How Language and Mind Create Meaning (2015). Cambridge University Press
- The Emoji Code: The Linguistics Behind Smiley Faces and Scaredy Cats (2017). Michael O'Mara Books (UK), and Picador (USA). ISBN 978-1250129062

=== Science fiction ===
- The Babel Apocalypse (Songs of the Sage, Book 1). (2023). Nephilim Publishing

=== Popular science articles ===
- Real talk. Aeon (4 December 2014)
- $\sharp$Language: evolution in the digital age. The Guardian (26 June 2015)
- Can emojis really be used to make terror threats? The Guardian (2 February 2015)
- How a joke can help us unlock the mystery of meaning in language. Quartz (21 December 2015)
- Emojis actually make our language better. New York Post (12 August 2017)
- Coronavirus Emojis: Conveying Compassion and Humour With a Facemask. The Wire (4 May 2020)
