= Philip Sayer =

Welsh actor (1946–1989)

- Born: 26 October 1946; Swansea, Wales, Britain
- Died: 19 September 1989 (aged 42)
- Occupation: Actor

Philip Sayer (26 October 1946 – 19 September 1989) was a Welsh actor. He worked for stage, film and television; his probably best known role was as Sam Phillips in the science fiction horror film Xtro (1983).

== Biography ==
Philip Sayer was born on 26 October 1946 in Swansea, the son of Thomas Henry and Myra Sayer.

He died of cancer in 1989, aged 42. After Sayers's death, Brian May (who had never met the actor) attended a memorial service and subsequently wrote the song "Just One Life" as a tribute. A Philip Sayer Scholarship fund was set up at LAMDA in Sayer's memory. Sayer Clinics are named after and in memory of Philip Sayer.

In a 2017 interview, actress Susan Sarandon revealed that she had had an affair with Sayer and that he had been gay.

== Appearances ==
- A Midsummer Night's Dream (1972 play)
- Miss Julie (1972)
- Adult Fun (1972)
- The Rocky Horror Show (London stage show, 1974)
- Whodunnit? - A Time to Dye (TV series, 1976)
- Crown Court (TV series, 1976)
- Sebastiane (1976 film)
- Rock Follies of 77 (television 1977)
- Van der Valk - Man of Iron (TV series, 1977)
- BBC2 Play of the Week - Oscar Wilde - Fearless Frank (TV series, 1978)
- Play for Today - The After-Dinner Joke (TV series, 1978)
- ITV Playhouse - The Reaper (TV series, 1979)
- Shoestring - The Mayfly Dance (TV series, 1980)
- A Tale of Africa (1980 film)
- ITV Playhouse - A Ferry Ride Away (TV series, 1981)
- BBC2 Playhouse - Bobby Wants to Meet Me (TV series, 1981)
- Xtro (1983 film)
- Slayground (1983 film)
- Shades of Darkness (TV series, 1983)
- Dead on Time (1983 short film)
- The Hunger (1983 film)
- A.D. (1985)
- Inside Out (TV series, 1985)
- Arthur the King (TV Movie, 1985)
- Bluebell as Marcel Leibovici (television 1986)
- Shanghai Surprise (1986)
- Floodtide as Dr Ramsey (television 1987–1988)
- Star Trap as Basil Underwood (TV Movie, 1988)
- Edens Lost (Swedish TV movie, 1991) (posthumous release)
