= Sif (Dark Souls) =

Video game character

- Dark Souls character
- First game: Dark Souls (2011)
- Created by: Hidetaka Miyazaki

In-universe information
- Species: Wolf
- Title: Great Grey Wolf
- Weapon: Greatsword

Sif, the Great Grey Wolf (Japanese: 灰色の大狼シフ, Hepburn: Hai'iro no Dairō Shifu) is a character and boss in the 2011 action role-playing game Dark Souls. A wolf that has grown to a massive size, it protects the grave of its deceased master, Knight Artorias the Abysswalker, and the Covenant of Artorias, a ring that allows its wearer to traverse the Abyss, a dark void normally impassable by mortals. The fight with Sif has been cited by critics as one of the most memorable in the game due to the role reversal of the player as a transgressor. Sif also functions as an optional ally in the game's DLC.

== Characteristics ==
Sif is a large, silver-colored wolf that is several times the height of the player. Its gender is unspecified in the game itself. In the Artorias of the Abyss DLC, during which the player character is taken back in time hundreds of years earlier, Sif is shown to have been slightly larger than a normal wolf during its time as the companion of Knight Artorias, when it accompanied the knight to slay a primeval human known as Manus, Father of the Abyss, who had been resurrected and driven mad by the sorcerers of Oolacile. When Artorias is overwhelmed by the power of Manus, his shield arm broken and useless, he uses his Cleansing Greatshield to form a magical barrier around the wolf and save it. If the player rescues it, it can be summoned to fight Manus. In the ensuing years, it continued to survive and grow to tremendous size to protect Artorias' grave.

Sif fights by grabbing Artorias's sword from in front of the grave and holding it in its mouth. It has a strong memory, as it remembers the player if they saved it during the DLC beforehand, but still engages the player in battle. If Sif is reduced to low health, it begins limping in pain and struggles to perform its attacks. When Sif is killed, the player obtains the Covenant of Artorias and Sif's soul, which can forge several weapons.

== Promotion and reception ==
A 25 inch (63.5 cm) tall statue of Sif, including different swords and an art print, was released in 2018. Sif was also included in the Darkroot Basin expansion set of Dark Souls: The Board Game.

The emotional aspects of the Sif fight were praised by critics, although some called the lack of a means to avoid the fight a negative aspect. Nate Hohl of GameCrate called the fight with Sif "tear-jerking", saying that it elicited "genuine sorrow" in the player. Calling it a "cruel twist" that the game's developers did not allow Sif to be spared, he said that the fact that Sif is capable of recognizing the player if they saved it in the past made the fight even more "tragic". Game Informer awarded the fight against Sif the award for best boss fight of 2011, calling it "heartbreaking" in addition to its ingame difficulty. Tom Senior of PC Gamer concurred that the fight was tragic, calling it "one of the saddest encounters in Dark Souls" due to the player being forced to punish the wolf's "eternal loyalty" to its master, Artorias, and also speculating that Sif was not simply guarding Artorias' ring, but attempting to prevent future adventurers from falling to the same fate. Rich Stanton of Eurogamer called the fight against Sif "one that saddens me" and remarked that he never summoned other players for the fight, also stating that in the early days of the game's release, an email chain of reviewers looked for ways to save Sif, even though that rumor was later debunked.

Ashley Reed of GamesRadar+ called the fight "pretty impressive but emotionally uncompromising", noting that the player realizes that Sif is not as evil as they seem once they play the game's DLC, and that if the player saves Sif beforehand, the character "makes [their] despair clear". Andi Hamilton of the same publication called Sif the second greatest Dark Souls boss, saying that it "plays out like an honorable duel between two beings that don't want to fight". Katelyn Gadd, programmer of Grim Fandango Remastered and Escape Goat 2, called the fight the most powerful experience she ever had in a video game, due to the realization that she was the intruder and she wanted to let the boss live, even though the game mechanics did not allow it.

Some critics believed Sif's appearance to be endearing, with Jeffrey Matulef of Eurogamer calling Sif "the series's most adorable boss" due to the fact that it holds a sword in its mouth. Cameron Kunzelman of Kotaku also called Sif "a big furry wolf who is extremely heckin' cute", despite the character's dark backstory.

Tributes to the character have also been noticed in other games. Game journalists, as well as Bandai Namco, the publisher of Dark Souls, have commented that Zacian, the legendary Pokémon of Pokémon Sword and Shield, may have been directly inspired by Sif, due to its similar appearance and method of wielding a sword in its mouth. An Easter egg of Sif appeared in World of Warcraft: Mists of Pandaria as a quest enemy called Cracklefang that is "much easier to defeat". The character also saw a cameo in Quake mod Raven Keep as an enemy.
