= A Tale of Africa =

- Film poster
- Directed by: Susumu Hani; Simon Trevor
- Screenplay by: Shintaro Tsuji
- Story by: Shūji Terayama
- Produced by: Yoichi Matsue; Shintaro Tsuji
- Starring: James Stewart; Philip Sayer; Eleonora Vallone
- Cinematography: Tsuguzo Matsumae; Simon Trevor
- Edited by: Nobuhiko Hosaka
- Music by: Naozumi Yamamoto; New Japan Philharmonic
- Production company: Sanrio
- Distributed by: Sanrio
- Release date: July 19, 1980 (Japan)
- Running time: 120 minutes
- Country: Japan
- Languages: Japanese; English

A Tale of Africa (Japanese: アフリカ物語, Hepburn: Afurika Monogatari), also known as The Green Horizon, is a 1980 Japanese drama film directed by Susumu Hani and Simon Trevor and starring James Stewart in his final live-action theatrically-released film role. The film's screenplay was written by Sanrio founder Shintaro Tsuji from a story by Shūji Terayama. Sanrio released A Tale of Africa on July 19, 1980, in Japan.

== Plot ==
When a pilot crash-lands in the African jungle, he meets an old man and his granddaughter. He falls in love with the girl, but their happiness is destroyed when his fiancée arrives.

== Cast ==
- James Stewart as Old Man
- Philip Sayer as Man
- Kathy as Girl
- Eleonora Vallone as Woman
- Heekura Simba as Elder

== Production ==
The film was shot from late 1979 to early 1980 in Kenya.

== Release ==
The film premiered in the United States in 1981 on the Showtime network.

== Reception ==
Variety wrote, "This may be the slowest moving picture this side of a Cezanne still life ... Director Susumu Hani, not unexpectedly for an urbanite plopped down in the middle of what appears to be a game preserve, demonstrates an obsessive fascination with wild animals, inserting at every conceivable opportunity shots of gazelles leaping, hyenas laughing, monkeys playing tricks, all of which not only serve to break the already stately pace of the story, but to stretch this paper-thin tale to an almost unbearable length. Further, the dearth of dialog doesn't do much to advance the plot. ... With the marginal exception of Stewart's performance, emoting by human actors is regularly topped by their dumb counterparts. Particularly hard to take is Kathy, who, in her screen debut, speaks in that unformed, little girl voice peculiar to models who aspire to become actresses. Worst, however, is Eleanora Vallone, an actress capable of the most outlandish inflections, who plays the fiancée."

David Parkinson of the Radio Times awarded the film two stars out of five, writing, "Noted for introducing cinéma vérité realism into his fictional features, Susumu Hani spent much of the 1970s making wildlife documentaries for Japanese television. So it wasn't too much of a stretch for him to combine both preoccupations in this mediocre melodrama, which looks superb (thanks to cinematographer/co-director Simon Trevor) but makes few emotional or intellectual demands. In what proved to be his final big-screen appearance, James Stewart is wasted as the owner of an African animal sanctuary whose peaceful idyll is disrupted when pilot Philip Sayer crash-lands in the jungle and promptly falls in love with Stewart's granddaughter."

Leonard Maltin gave the film a "BOMB" rating, writing, "Even old Jimmy is boring."
