= The Emoji Code =

2017 book

- UK left and US right
- Author: Vyvyan Evans
- Language: English
- Genre: Popular science
- Published: May 18 2017 (UK); Aug 1 2017 (US)
- Publisher: Michael O'Mara (UK); Picador (US)
- Publication place: United States
- ISBN: 978-1250129062
- Website: https://www.vyvevans.net/the-emoji-code

The Emoji Code is a 2017 book by linguist Vyvyan Evans, analyzing emoji as a form of digital communication in the evolution of language and writing systems. The book argues that emoji constitutes missing element in digital communication, vis-a-vis face-to-face spoken communication, by providing the "new body language of the digital age". As such, Evans claims that "emojis actually enhance our language [in digital communication] and our ability to wield it." It was released in the United Kingdom on May 18, 2017, while in the United States on August 1, 2017.

== Thesis ==
The Emoji Code claims that Emoji fulfils a similar function in digital communication to gesture, body language and intonation in spoken interactions, helping to provide the emotional cues so often missing in textspeak. By clarifying our digital conversations, emojis can be seen as empowering, a force for good in twenty-first-century communication. As such, the argument is that Emoji is a paralanguage, facilitating better emotional resonance in digital communication, making us more effective communicators. In essence, "emojis are a visual representation that offer non-verbal cues in text, much in the same way that body language and vocal tone is a conduit of meaning in everyday face-to-face conversations." Evans also argues that Emoji has a vital function in educational contexts, especially among children.

A notable argument of the book is that Emoji fulfils a number of communicative functions that mirror those fulfilled by gesture, eye gaze, facial expression and tone of voice in face-to-face spoken interaction. Evans enumerates six functions of Emoji in digital communication: substitution, reinforcement, contradiction, metacommentary (or complementing), emphasis and discourse management. This analysis has been hailed as influential in how Emoji functions as a system of communication.

== Reception ==
The Emoji Code has been criticized as ardently advocating Emoji as a system of communication when in fact, Emoji is a "gimmick" and something of a backward step, in terms of how we communicate. Evans responded by claiming that such views misunderstand the nature of communication, and how it evolves, claiming that "A lot of people think they [Emoji] are a backward step, but this misunderstands the nature of human communication”. He contends that such views represent "ill-informed cultural elitism...emojis simply are not relevant for long-form written communication: literature, complex prose, articles in scientific journals. Emojis’ relevance lies in the abbreviated digital messages of daily life."

In response to this defense, one NPR reviewer attacked The Emoji Code for presenting attitudes toward Emoji in a binary manner--that people are either violently for or violently against emojis. The criticism is that by "tarring all critics of emojis with the same broad brush...The Emoji Code isn't entirely convincing in its ardent advocacy of smiley faces and scaredy cats".

== Controversy ==
Evans' research on the speed of uptake of Emoji led to his claim that Emoji is the closest humanity has come to a universal mode of communication. This was widely reported in the media as Evans claiming that Emoji had actually become a language. Representative headlines included: "Emoji is Britain's fastest growing language" and Emoji is "the fastest growing form of language ever”. This led to a wide range of criticism under the banner: "Linguists launch war of words on emoji as a language debate", with one notable internet linguist Gretchen McCulloch stating: "They’re totally fun! I like emoji! But not every way of communicating is equivalent to language.”

Evans responded in The Emoji Code by making clear that Emoji is a code, not a language. Evans posits that Emoji lacks the grammatical complexity or semantic richness of a true language. He argues that “Emoji isn’t a language as such. They are artificially created. They don’t evolve in the way that the natural language does. They don’t have a grammatical system". However, Evans claims that, like other systems of communication, Emoji fufils language-like functions. He cites legal cases where emojis can be perceived as amounting to death threats, in much the same way as a verbal threat. This is because, Evans contends, just like language, Emoji as a system of communication exhibits what he terms an interactional function--an attempt to influence the behavior of others, though language, or a language-like system.

Evans has also claimed that it is possible, in principle, for a system of communication such as Emoji to develop into a fully formed language. He cites examples such as Emoji Dick, a crowd-funded translation of the novel Moby Dick, and the visual representation of Alice in Wonderland as an emoji lattice.

== Editions ==
The Emoji Code was published by Picador in North America, and by Michael O'Mara in the UK in 2017. A Chinese language edition was published in 2021 by Peking University Press.

The UK title is The Emoji Code: How Smiley Faces, Love Hearts and Thumbs Up are Changing the Way We Communicate.

The US title is The Emoji Code: The Linguistics Behind Smiley Faces and Scaredy Cats.
