= Aronstein =

Aronstein is a surname. Notable people with the surname include:

- Barbara Aronstein Black (1933–2026), American legal scholar
- Martin Aronstein (1936–2002), American lighting designer
- Victor Aronstein (1896–1945), German-Jewish doctor murdered in Auschwitz

== See also ==
- Arnstein (personal name)
