= Arthur Blake (English actor) =

English actor (1929–2001)

- Born: Arthur James Blake; 7 November 1929; Washington, Tyne and Wear, England
- Died: 27 November 2001 (aged 72); Kensington, London, England
- Occupation: actor
- Years active: 1954–1996

Arthur Blake (7 November 1929, Washington, Tyne and Wear – 27 November 2001, Kensington, London, England) was an English actor who appeared in British television and film from the 1950s through the 1990s.

== Biography ==
While attending Brandy Row School, Blake would entertain his friends with a puppet theatre. It was while studying for a B.A. degree in English literature at King's College that he dismayed his parents (his father being a mining engineer) by announcing that he was going to act on stage.

Winning the Sir James Knott scholarship to the Royal Academy of Dramatic Art, Blake studied there for two years, graduating in 1954. From there, he joined the Old Vic and went onto perform at the Bristol Old Vic, Ipswich Arts Theatre and Nottingham Playhouse, as well as having appearances in television and film.

== Filmography ==
=== Film ===
- Quatermass 2 (1957)
- Girl Stroke Boy (1971)
- Male Bait (1971)
- The Cherry Picker (1974)
- Little Dorrit (1987)

=== Television ===
- Saturday Playhouse (1959)
- No Hiding Place (1959-1961)
- ITV Television Playhouse (1961)
- Z-Cars (1962)
- The Dickie Henderson Show (1963-1965)
- Crane (1965)
- Doctor Who (1965)
- Frontier (1968)
- Crime Buster (1968)
- Theatre Date (1969)
- World in Ferment (1969)
- Budgie (1971)
- ITV Sunday Night Theatre (1971)
- Hine (1971)
- Bel Ami (1971)
- War and Peace (1972)
- The Edwardians (1972)
- Heil Caesar! (1973)
- Thursday's Child (1973)
- The Stars Look Down (1975)
- Red Letter Day (1976)
- Striker (1976)
- Headmaster (1977)
- Armchair Thriller (1978)
- The Professionals (1978)
- Born and Bred (1980)
- Strangers (1980)
- When the Boat Comes In (1981)
- BBC2 Playhouse (1981)
- Funny Man (1981)
- Holding the Fort (1982)
- The Agatha Christie Hour (1982)
- The World About Us (1982)
- Rumpole of the Bailey (1983-1988)
- Mr. Palfrey of Westminster (1984)
- Bergerac (1985)
- Murder of a Moderate Man (1985)
- Sorry! (1986)
- First Among Equals (1986)
- The Bill (1986-1989)
- A Dorothy L. Sayers Mystery (1987)
- Don't Wait Up (1988)
- Double First (1988)
- Star Trap (1988)
- London's Burning (1989)
- Campion (1990)
- Unnatural Causes (1993)
- Under the Hammer (1994)
- No Bananas (1996)
