= Hornstein =

Hornstein may refer to:

- Hornstein (rock), a silicate-rich chemical sediment and one of the siliceous rocks
- Hornstein (surname)
- Hornstein, Austria, Burgenland
- 6712 Hornstein (1990 DS1), a Main-belt Asteroid (f. 1990)
- von Hornstein, name of a family of imperial knights in the south of Germany, near Riedlingen
