= The Peter Principle (TV series) =

TV series

- Also known as: The Boss (United States)
- Genre: Situation comedy
- Written by: Mark Burton; John O'Farrell; Dan Patterson
- Directed by: Terry Kinane (pilot); Nick Wood (series 1-2)
- Starring: Jim Broadbent; Claire Skinner; Daniel Flynn; Stephen Moore; David Schneider
- Country of origin: United Kingdom
- Original language: English
- No. of series: 2
- No. of episodes: 13

Production
- Executive producer: Denise O'Donoghue
- Producer: Dan Patterson
- Running time: 30 minutes
- Production company: Hat Trick Productions

Original release
- Network: BBC One
- Release: 4 September 1995 – 6 March 2000

The Peter Principle (broadcast as The Boss in the United States) is a British television sitcom. It was produced by Hat Trick Productions, and first broadcast by the BBC between 1995 and 2000 and by PBS in the United States. The series is set in the Aldbridge branch of the fictional County and Provincial Bank, featuring Jim Broadbent as the title character, its inept manager, and Claire Skinner, Daniel Flynn, Stephen Moore and David Schneider as his employees. The programme takes its name from the Peter Principle, a concept in management theory that states that workers are promoted to their level of incompetence.

== Characters ==
- Peter Duffley (Peter Duff in the pilot), Branch Manager (portrayed by Jim Broadbent) – Lazy and inept, Peter doesn't seem to take his job too seriously but manages to keep his position and is terrified of the idea of Assistant Manager Susan having any power at the branch.
- Susan Harvey, Assistant Manager (Lesley Sharp in the pilot; Claire Skinner in the series) – Career-minded and dedicated, Susan seems to be the person actually running the branch.
- David Edwards, Area Manager (Stuart McQuarrie in the pilot; Daniel Flynn in the series) – David is dedicated to County and Provincial, and knows that Peter doesn't give the job his all, but has a soft spot for him.
- Geoffrey Parkes, Chief Cashier (David Gant in the pilot; Stephen Moore in the series) – Geoffrey has been with the bank all his working life has little regard or time for Peter. He has his ear to the ground but seems happy not to have climbed to a position of greater responsibility and higher stress.
- Bradley Wilson, Junior Cashier (David Schneider) – Tech-savvy but not very intelligent, Bradley always obeys Peter out of a sense of fear.
- Iris, Secretary/Chief Clerk (Janette Legge; series 1) – Iris is middle-aged, quite dim, but appears very competent in her position.
- Brenda Corrigan, Cashier (series 1; Tracy Keating) – Brenda regards her position at the bank as little more than a pay packet.
- Barbara, Secretary/Chief Clerk (series 2; Beverley Callard) – Barbara's view of women in the workplace is that they should endeavour to sleep their way to the top. She fails to understand that Susan wishes to climb the ladder on merit alone.
- Evelyn Walker, Cashier (series 2; Wendy Nottingham) – After appearing in series 1 as a charity worker, Evelyn works for the bank in series 2. She suffers from bad nerves and spends almost as much time on the phone to the Samaritans as she spends doing her work duties.

== Episode list ==
=== Pilot (1995) ===
No.	Title	Original release date
1	"Pilot"	4 September 1995

=== Series 1 (1997) ===
No.	Title	Original release date
2	"Sex, Lies and Videotape"	2 June 1997
3	"Health Matters"	9 June 1997
4	"Upwardly Mobile"	16 June 1997
5	"The Midas Touch"	23 June 1997
6	"Insecurity"	30 June 1997
7	"Bank Hoiliday"	7 July 1997

=== Series 2 (2000) ===
No.	Title	Original release date
8	"Un Homme et Une Femme"	3 February 2000
9	"Desperately Seeking Susan"	10 February 2000
10	"Greyhound Day"	17 February 2000
11	"There's Something About Geoffrey"	21 February 2000
12	"Truly Bradley Deeply"	28 February 2000
13	"Casablanca"	6 March 2000

== Locations ==
Exterior scenes for the series were mainly filmed in Amersham, Buckinghamshire.
