= Solaire of Astora =

Fictional character

- Dark Souls character
- Concept art of Solaire
- First game: Dark Souls (2011)
- Created by: Hidetaka Miyazaki
- Voiced by: Daniel Flynn

Solaire of Astora (/soʊˈlɛər/; soh-LAIR) is a character from the 2011 video game Dark Souls. He is a knight notable for his signature gesture, "Praise the Sun", as well as an unusually friendly demeanor contrasting most of the other characters in the game.

== Characteristics ==
Like the player character, Solaire is an Undead who journeys to the land of Lordran from his homeland of Astora, albeit on a personal mission to "find his very own Sun". His world and the player's come into contact at various times during the game, and he gives the player a White Soapstone item during his first meeting so that the player can be summoned into other worlds as a phantom and "engage in jolly cooperation". He also offers to provide assistance for various bosses during the course of the game. His "summon sign" glows gold rather than the typical white, and he rewards the player with "Sunlight Medals" for a successful co-op fight, due to his membership in the covenant called the Warriors of Sunlight. The player may join the covenant upon meeting certain requirements, after which they can be summoned by a wider range of players, and gain the "Praise the Sun" gesture and "Lightning Spear" miracle.

Solaire is described as a skilled warrior who does not rely on any special powers to win beyond his signature miracles and rigorous training, as his equipment exhibits no special traits. His armor and shield are decorated with a hand-painted sun, reflecting his worship of the Sun, and by association, Lord Gwyn. While he was theorized by some fans to be Gwyn's firstborn son in disguise, this was later proven not to be the case in Dark Souls III. He uses a longsword called the Sunlight Straight Sword, which is described as a "featureless long sword contain[ing] the very power of the sun", as well as being "well-forged, and [kept] in good repair [...] but unlikely to live up to its grandiose name". The sword reappears in Dark Souls II as the Sun Sword, and in Dark Souls III under its original name, where it does have the special power to boost the attack of allies. His armor and shield are also obtainable in Dark Souls III by trading various items.

The player typically last encounters Solaire in Lost Izalith, where he has gone insane and hostile upon donning a Sunlight Maggot, which he considers to be his "Sun". However, if the player opens a shortcut and kills the Maggot beforehand, Solaire retains his sanity and can be summoned for the final boss.

Miyazaki has stated that Solaire being taken over by the Sunlight Maggot was intended as "the general norm", but if Solaire is kept alive he fights alongside the player for the last boss. According to Miyazaki, this is the "happiest ending, as he links" the flame in his own world and dies by "becoming the Sun".

== Development ==
The "Praise the Sun" gesture was conceived prior to the character of Solaire, and was a rare holy gesture used in Demon's Souls upon casting a miracle while wearing the "Ring of Sincere Prayer". The game's director, Hidetaka Miyazaki, secretly left the gesture in the game, despite being told by the game's publisher that the pose was not "cool enough" upon physically demonstrating it. From then on, the pose gained personal significance to him, and he was determined to also include it in Dark Souls. Miyazaki created the character of Solaire to bring recognition to the gesture and make it more popular, purposely positioning him as a "champion" who is the first truly helpful NPC that most players see in the game.

He is also Miyazaki's favorite character, with Miyazaki going as far as to design the Sun emblem that appears on Solaire's armor.

== Promotion and reception ==
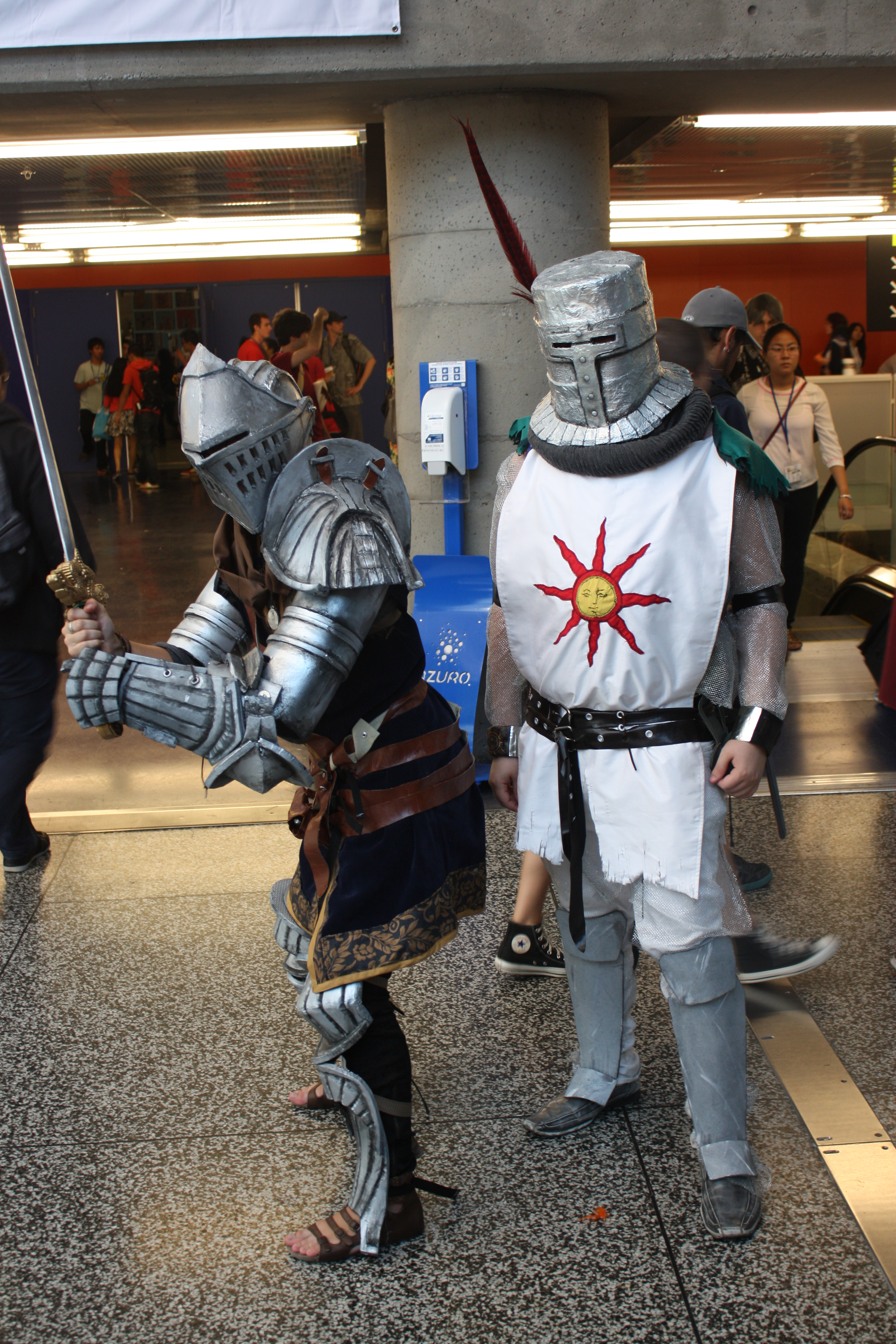
2014 Otakuthon with some attendees in cosplay

An Amiibo of Solaire was released alongside the Switch version of Dark Souls: Remastered in 2018. It causes the player's character in the game to perform the gesture when tapped without any prerequisites. However, the Amiibo was exclusive to GameStop, causing heavy shortages in availability and making it rarer than usual.

Destructoid named Solaire one of their favorite new video game characters of 2011, calling him "the embodiment of selfless camaraderie and generosity", as well as "bat-shit crazy". He was also called a "total badass" by Eurogamer. The mission to save Solaire was called one of the 20 most unique sidequests in video game history by GamesRadar+, saying that "if there ever was an NPC worth saving, it would be him". Matthew Byrd of Den of Geek called him the third best video game NPC, stating that "Solaire of Astora is everything that you're not expecting to find in Dark Souls. He's optimistic, friendly, and, if you play your cards right, helpful".

James Davenport of PC Gamer praised Solaire as "a human-shaped reminder that other people are all we have", also saying that the character was "why I so often rally against the 'get good' ethos that so many misguided Dark Souls players cling to". He stated that he liked the tragic ending of Solaire because it was a "call to action", though saying that he would save the character on his next playthrough.

Solaire was modded into Darkest Dungeon as a playable character by a fan of the game, which was called a "fantastic mixup" of the two games by PC Gamer. He also was given Easter eggs in Borderlands 2 as the similarly named "Knight Solitaire", and in World of Warcraft: Warlords of Draenor as a follower named "Soulare of Andorhal". A "Praise the Sun"-inspired gesture was included as an emote in Destiny.
