= Angela L. Walker Franklin =

American academic

President of Des Moines University
- Incumbent
- Assumed office March 2011

Personal details
- Born: McCormick, South Carolina, U.S.
- Education: Furman University (BA); Emory University (PhD)
- Profession: Academic

Angela L. Walker Franklin is an American academic who is the president of Des Moines University, Iowa, in office since 2011. She has a background in clinical psychology.

Franklin is originally from McCormick, South Carolina. She completed her B.A. in psychology at Furman University and then a Ph.D. in clinical psychology at Emory University, followed by an internship at Grady Memorial Hospital, Atlanta. In 1986, Franklin joined the Morehouse School of Medicine in Atlanta as an assistant professor of psychiatry. She eventually became the school's associate vice-president for academic affairs. In 2007, Franklin joined Meharry Medical College, Tennessee, as provost and executive vice-president. She briefly served as acting president in 2009. In 2011, Franklin was appointed president of Des Moines University, the first woman and the first African-American to hold the position. She published a memoir, An Unconventional Journey … An Unlikely Choice, in 2014.
