= Arnstein Castle (Austria) =

Coordinates: 48.0295°N 16.0661°E

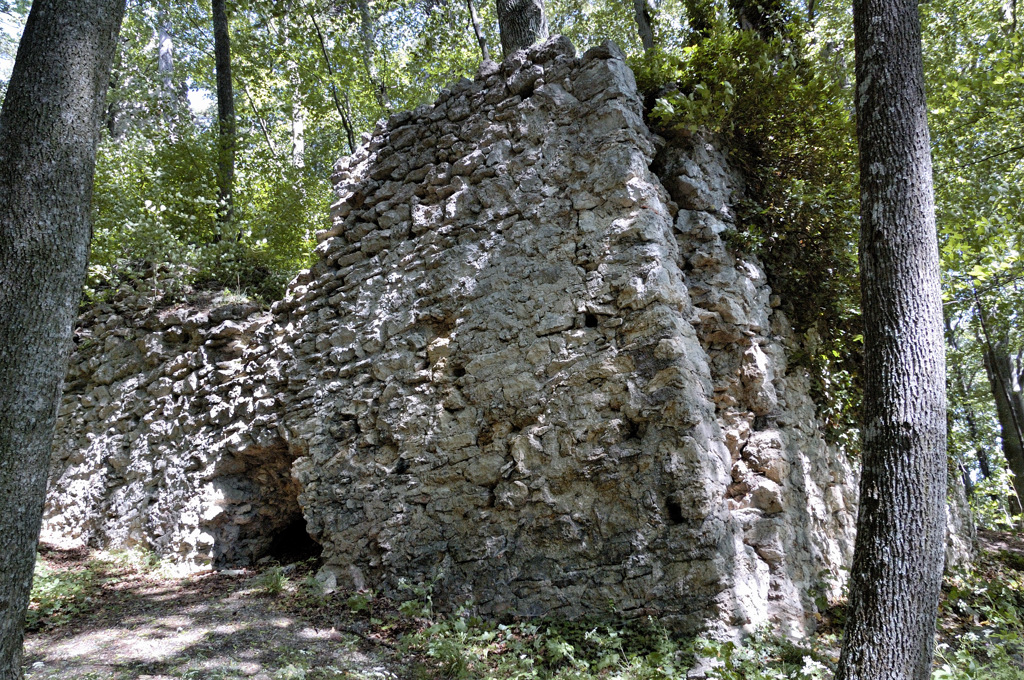

Site history
- Built: 1170
- Built by: Wichard von Arnstein

Arnstein is a 12th-century castle ruin, located above Maria Raisenmarkt in Austria. In 1529 Arnstein was destroyed by Turkish troops in the Siege of Vienna.
