= Ira B. Arnstein =

Composer

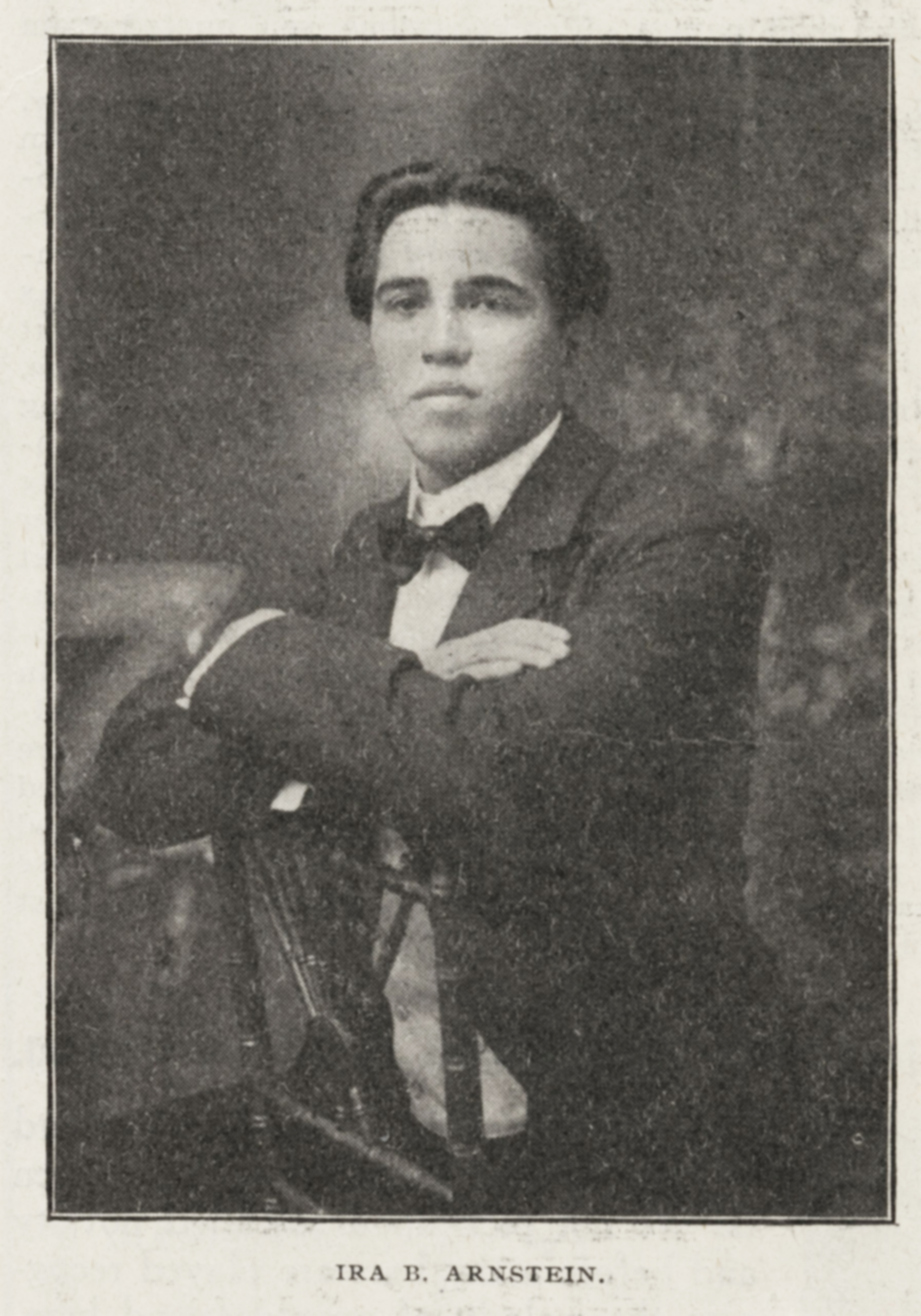
- Ira B. Arnstein from Musical Observer
- Born: April 12, 1879
- Died: September 13, 1956 (aged 77)
- Occupations: songwriter, composer

Ira B. Arnstein (born Itzig Arenstein April 12, 1879 – September 13, 1956) was a musical composer, songwriter, and "chronic litigator".

Arnstein was born in Litzingen, Russia (now Letychiv Ukraine), the son of Bernard Solomon Arnstein and Sophia (Sophie) Kozovoc. He emigrated to the United States when he was eleven. He studied piano at Scharwenka Conservatory in New York. He composed mainly "parlor piano pieces and Yiddish songs", once writing a Jewish national anthem entitled "Soldiers of Zion".

== Litigation ==
It was noted that Arnstein experienced "copyright infringement persecution mania", always certain that others were stealing his work. Arnstein sued Cole Porter, Irving Berlin and Twentieth Century-Fox, among others, for copyright infringement. He picketed ASCAP after being rejected by them for membership. In 1937, he launched a major lawsuit against twenty-three composers and publishers simultaneously and lost them all. In 1941, he sued Broadcast Music International for not only rejecting his application but also for allegedly stealing the music he submitted with his application. In 1946, the Second Circuit court granted Arnstein’s appeal in a suit against Cole Porter. The jurors were directed that in order to find infringement, a "two-pronged test" must be used.

1. a plaintiff had to show that the defendant had copied him (using charts or other diagrams)
2. the plaintiff had to show that the copying was so extensive that it counted as infringement; a layperson must be able to hear the copied songs as essentially similar

Arnstein lost that lawsuit and had to pay Porter's legal fees. He never won any of the many cases he filed.
