= Benjamin Orenstein =

Polish Holocaust survivor (1926–2021)

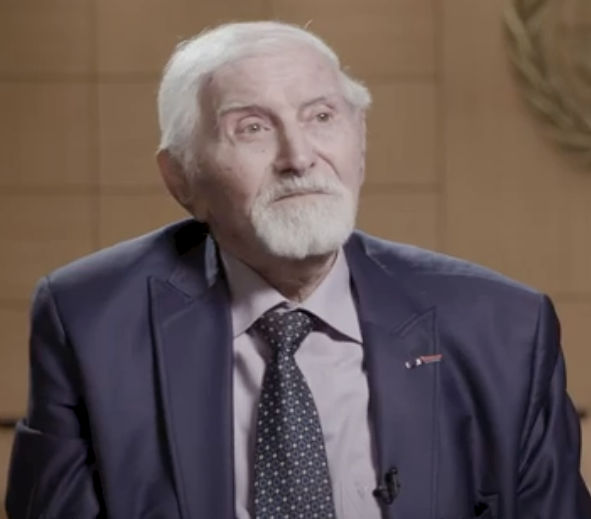
- In a UNOHCHR video in 2019
- Born: 4 August 1926; Annopol, Second Polish Republic
- Died: 10 February 2021 (aged 94); Lyon, France

Benjamin Orenstein (4 August 1926 – 10 February 2021) was a Polish-born Jewish Holocaust survivor.

== Biography ==
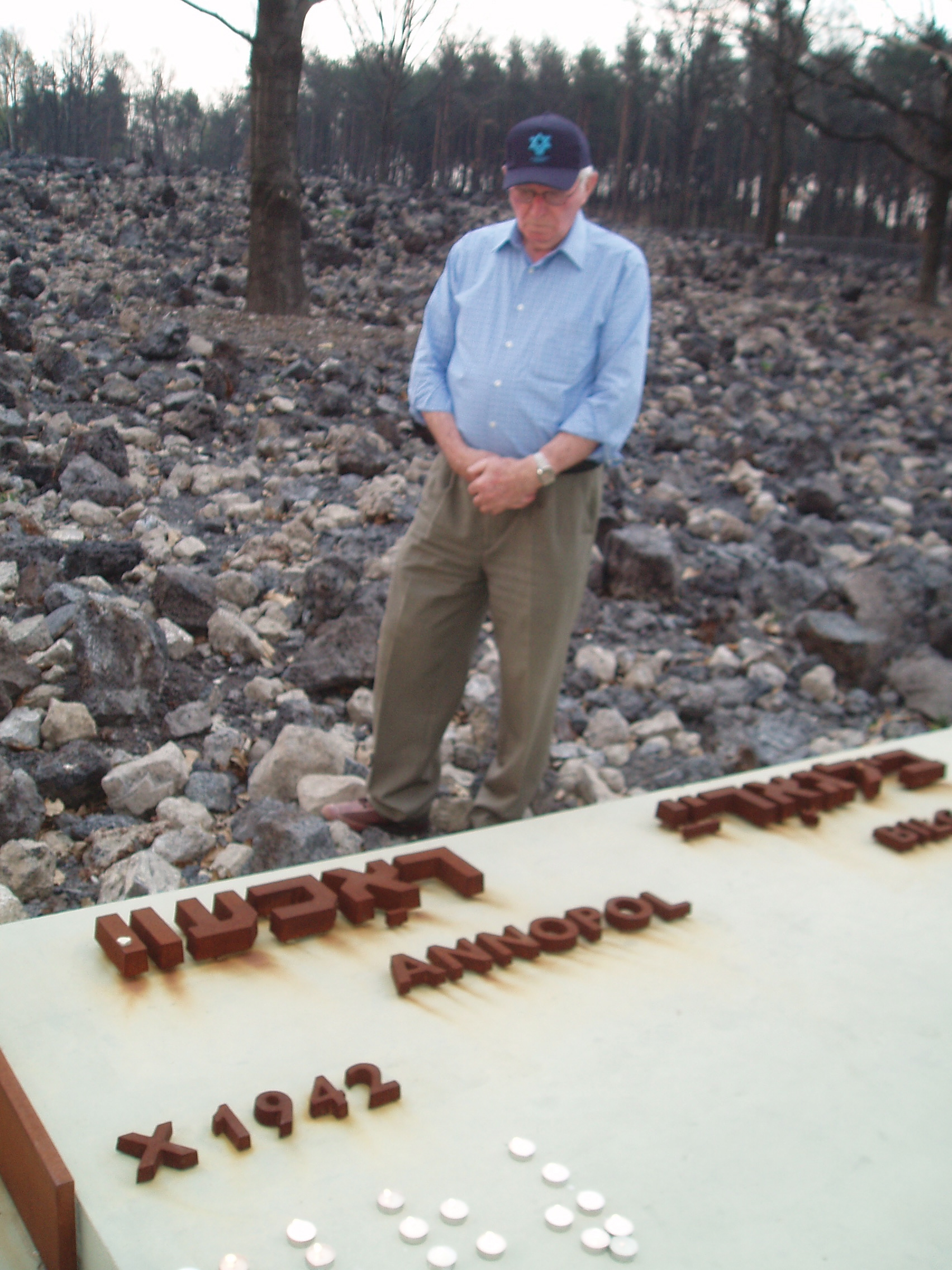
At Belzec extermination camp in 2006

Orenstein was born in Annopol into a family of Polish Jews. In 1941, Annopol was transformed into a ghetto. That year, he was sent to a labor camp and experienced Polish anti-Semitism. His family was arrested in the autumn of 1942 and arrived at Auschwitz on 4 August 1944. He was tattooed with the number "B4416". In January 1945, he was forced to take part in a death march to Mittelbau-Dora concentration camp. He was liberated by the United States Armed Forces on 11 April 1945.

After he was liberated, he was sent to Thionville for medical treatment, then to the Jewish Agency for Israel in Uggiate-Trevano. He moved to Mandatory Palestine, settling in Alumot. He fought in the 1948 Arab–Israeli War before becoming demobilized and moved to Lyon to live with his cousin as an illegal immigrant. After a few months, he earned his naturalized citizenship and married a fellow Holocaust survivor in 1954.

Throughout the remainder of his life, Orenstein gave lectures at various primary and secondary schools on the Holocaust and accompanied them on trips to Auschwitz. On 26 January 2020, the 75th anniversary of the Liberation of Auschwitz concentration camp, he spoke at the memorial. He explained the importance of maintaining the memory of the horrific events, saying that "The Holocaust is in me, I live with the Holocaust on a daily basis!"

Benjamin Orenstein died on 10 February 2021 in Lyon at the age of 94.

== Distinctions ==
- Knight of the Legion of Honour

== Works ==
- Ces mots pour sépulture (2006)
