= Michal Hornstein =

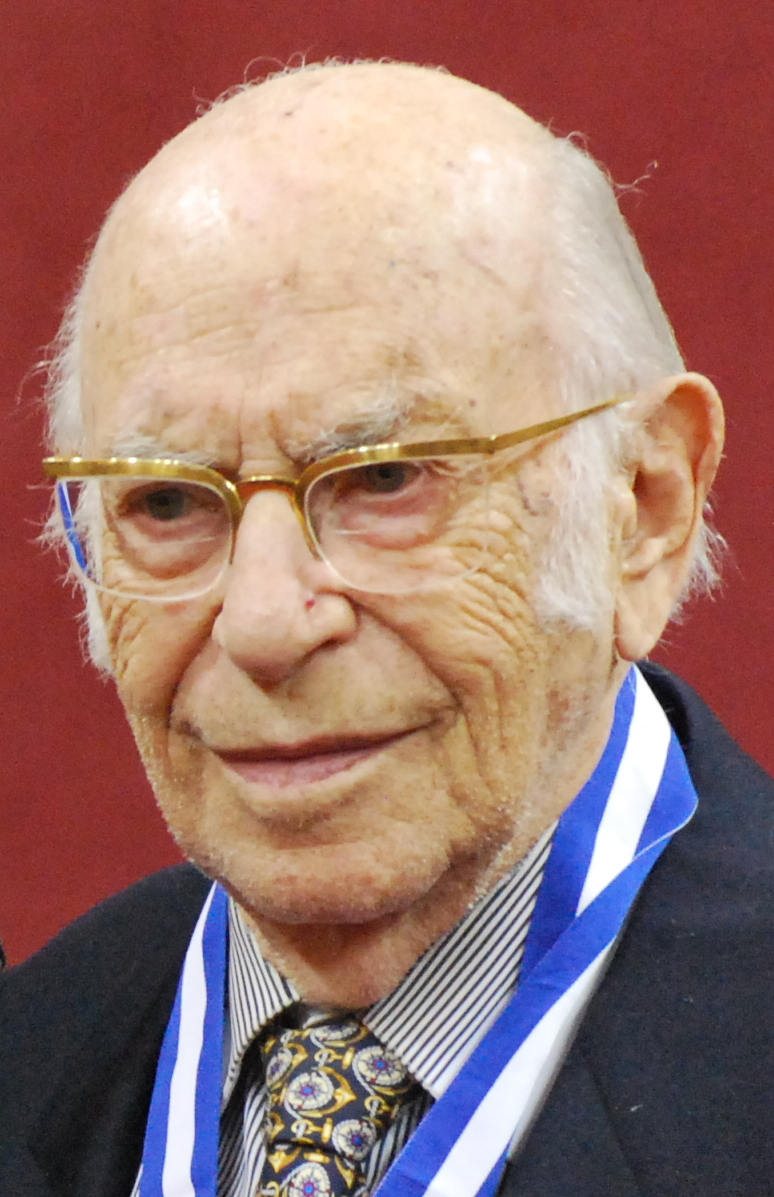
- Michal Hornstein at the National Order of Quebec ceremony in 2013
- Born: September 17, 1920; Tarnów, Poland
- Died: April 25, 2016 (aged 95); Montreal, Quebec, Canada
- Known for: Businessman & Philanthropist
- Children: Norbert Hornstein
- Awards: Order of Canada; National Order of Quebec

Michal Hornstein OC GOQ (September 17, 1920 – April 25, 2016) was a Polish-born Canadian businessman, art collector and philanthropist.

== Biography ==
Born in Tarnów, Poland and raised in Kraków, he was captured by the German army during World War II forced onto a train and deported to Auschwitz. However, before the train reached the notorious concentration camp, Hornstein jumped from its side. He spent the rest of the war — which claimed the lives of innumerable of his family members and friends — hiding from the Nazis in the forests of Czechoslovakia and living in Budapest before decamping for Bratislava.

In Bratislava, he met Renata Witelson, another Polish Jew fleeing Nazi persecution. Witelson had spent much of the war in hiding — in the Warsaw Ghetto, in a convent, with a Polish family and in safe houses. It was in one of those safe houses that the couple met. In 1946, they were married in Rome. He immigrated to Canada in 1951, at the encouragement of the Canadian ambassador to Italy, whom they had befriended, and relocated to Montreal. He became a citizen in 1957. He founded the company, Federal Construction Ltd., a real estate company, where he made his fortune and remained president of the company until his final days.

The Hornsteins became prominent patrons of major Montreal institutions, including hospitals and universities. But the couple is most closely associated with the Montreal Museum of Fine Arts (MMFA). Michal Hornstein had served on its board of trustees, almost continuously, since 1970. He also played an important role raising funds for the museum's collection, amassing a vast collection of Renaissance paintings and helped raise millions that went toward restoring and expanding the museum. Michal Hornstein contributed to the collection himself, donating some 420 works of art, and played a role in the acquisition of 23 others. In 2012, the couple announced it was donating its collection of 75 Old Master paintings to the museum, a gift estimated to be worth $75 million. The MMFA described it as the largest ever private donation to a Quebec museum. The Old Masters collection is housed in the Michal and Renata Hornstein Pavilion for Peace, which opened in early November 2016. The couple's name also graces an existing pavilion, which houses galleries dedicated to Asian and Islamic art.

The Hornsteins also donated money to education and health care, namely the Montreal Heart Institute, the Montreal General Hospital, Hôpital Notre-Dame and the Jewish General Hospital. Their son Norbert Hornstein is a linguist who made notable contributions to generative syntax.

On Wednesday, June 11, 2014, at the John Molson School of Business’ spring convocation ceremony, Concordia University conferred upon Michal and Renata Hornstein honorary doctorates in recognition of their lifetime of philanthropy.

== Death ==
Hornstein died at his home in Montreal, Quebec on April 25, 2016, aged 95.

== Honours ==
In 1984 he was made a Member of the Order of Canada. In 1993 he was made a Knight of the National Order of Quebec, promoted to Officer in 2002 and Grand Officer in 2013.
