= Irving L. Gornstein =

American lawyer

Irving "Irv" L. Gornstein is the Executive Director of the Supreme Court Institute and a Professor from Practice at Georgetown University Law Center. He teaches Constitutional Law, and co-teaches a Supreme Court Institute Workshop with Supreme Court advocate Kannon Shanmugam.

Prior to coming to the Georgetown Law Center in 2012, he worked at O'Melveny & Myers where he specialized in appellate advocacy and U.S. Supreme Court litigation. Prior to that, Gornstein spent 13 years in the United States Solicitor General's Office as a Deputy Solicitor General where he argued 38 cases before the Supreme Court. Some of the more well known cases he argued include IBP, Inc. v. Alvarez, Dixon v. United States, Missouri v. Seibert, Florida v. J. L., and Ohio v. Robinette. Additionally, Gornstein argued 30 cases before various United States Courts of Appeals, notably the United States Department of Justice's defense of the prison sentence imposed on one of the police officers found guilty of beating Rodney King. Prior to working in the Solicitor General's office, Gornstein worked in DOJ's Civil Rights Division for 30 years.

Gornstein attended high school at Ladue High School and later graduated from the University of Michigan with a B.G.S. and from Boston University with a J.D.
