= Amy Foxx-Orenstein =

American physician

- Education: Des Moines University (DO)
- Occupation: Gastroenterologist

Amy Foxx-Orenstein, D.O., FACG is an American gastroenterologist. She is an associate professor of medicine at the Mayo Clinic College of Medicine a former president of the American College of Gastroenterology (2007–2008).

Dr. Foxx-Orenstein is a fellow of the American College of Physicians as well as a fellow of the American College of Gastroenterology. She attended medical school at Des Moines University in Des Moines, Iowa. She completed internal medicine residency training at Geisinger Health System in Pennsylvania and gastroenterology fellowship at Virginia Commonwealth University Health System.

Dr. Foxx-Orenstein is the author of numerous scholarly articles on gastroenterology.
