= Arnstein Aassve =

Norwegian demographer

- Born: June 19, 1968 (age 57); Molde, Norway

Academic work
- Discipline: Demography
- Institutions: Bocconi University

Arnstein Aassve (born 19 June 1968) is a Norwegian social scientist and professor of demography at Bocconi University in Milan. His research lies at the intersection of demography, sociology and economics, with a focus on family formation, fertility, trust, social cohesion and demographic change in ageing societies.

Aassve has held several academic leadership roles at Bocconi University, including Dean of the Undergraduate School and Director of doctoral programmes. He has led major international research projects funded by the European Research Council and the Horizon Europe programme, and has served in advisory roles for European and international organisations on demographic change, inequality and intergenerational fairness.

== Education ==
Aassve began his higher education with a Bachelor of Science in Economics, Law and Computer Science from Molde University College (Norway). He subsequently moved to the University of Bristol (United Kingdom), where he obtained a Diploma in Economics, an MSc in Economics and Finance, and a PhD in Economics in 2000. His doctoral thesis examined family formation using econometric methods.

== Academic career ==
After completing his PhD, Aassve worked as a research scientist at the Max Planck Institute for Demographic Research in Rostock, Germany, where he conducted research on the transition to adulthood and home leaving. He later held academic positions in the United Kingdom, including Lecturer in Economics at the University of Leicester and Chief Research Officer at the Institute for Economic and Social Research at the University of Essex.

In 2007, Aassve joined Bocconi University in Milan, where he was appointed Full Professor of Demography in 2014. From 2014 to 2016, he served as Dean of the Undergraduate School. He has also been Director of doctoral programmes in Public Policy and Administration and in Social and Political Science. In addition, he has served on Bocconi's Executive Committee and contributed to institutional strategy, programme development and internationalisation.

Aassve has held visiting and honorary positions at several institutions, including the University of Wisconsin–Madison. He has served as chair and member of evaluation panels for the European Research Council.

== Research ==
Aassve's research examines how individuals and families navigate social, economic and institutional change, with particular attention to fertility, partnership dynamics, trust, and social cohesion. He has contributed to the study of demographic behaviour within welfare regimes and to the analysis of how economic insecurity, gender norms and institutional trust shape family formation.

More recently, his work has focused on demographic responses to major societal shocks, including the COVID-19 pandemic, as well as on fertility decline, intergenerational inequality and demographic resilience in Europe and beyond. His research has appeared in journals such as Demography, Population and Development Review, European Sociological Review, Social Forces, Science and the Proceedings of the National Academy of Sciences.

== Selected research projects ==
Aassve has served as principal investigator for several major international research projects, including:

- Consequences of Demographic Change (CODEC), European Research Council Starting Grant
- Institutional Family Demography (IFAMID), European Research Council Advanced Grant
- Futu-Res: A Resilient Future for Europe, Horizon Europe collaborative project

He has also contributed to European research infrastructures such as the Generations and Gender Programme and has been involved in survey design and analysis for international organisations, including UNFPA and the OECD.

== Awards ==
In 2014, Aassve received the Dirk van de Kaa Award in Social Demography, which recognises outstanding contributions to the study of population dynamics and social change.

== Additional achievements ==
Aassve obtained the Dirk van de Kaa award in Social Demography 2014. This Award honours outstanding achievements by an individual scholar in social demography, and the interplay of population dynamics and social change.

He is also the co-founder of the interdisciplinary Alp-Pop Conference. Initiated in 2011 it has attracted world leading social scientists concerned with population issues.

== Selected publications ==
- Aassve, A. et al. (2020). "The COVID-19 pandemic and human fertility." Science.
- Aassve, A. et al. (2021). "Early assessment of the relationship between the COVID-19 pandemic and births in high-income countries." Proceedings of the National Academy of Sciences.
- Aassve, A., Mencarini, L., & Sironi, M. (2015). "Institutional change, happiness, and fertility." European Sociological Review.
- Aassve, A., Billari, F. C., & Pessin, L. (2016). "Trust and fertility dynamics." Social Forces.
- Aassve, A. et al. (2024). "Family ideals in an era of low fertility." Proceedings of the National Academy of Sciences.
