= Star Trap =

1988 British television film

- Genre: Comedy, thriller
- Screenplay by: Tony Bicât
- Directed by: Tony Bicât
- Starring: Daniel Flynn; Nicky Henson; Philip Sayer; Jeananne Crowley; John Pennington; Frances Tomelty; Lucy Benjamin; Hugh Simon; Allan Surtees; Sandra Yue; Bryan Matheson; Arthur Blake
- Music by: Nick Bicât
- Country of origin: United Kingdom
- Original language: English

Production
- Executive producer: Nick Elliott
- Producer: Nigel Stafford-Clark
- Cinematography: Witold Stok
- Editor: Bill Shapter
- Running time: 96 minutes
- Production companies: London Weekend Television; Zenith Productions

Original release
- Network: ITV
- Release: 8 July 1989

Star Trap is a 1988 British television film with a screenplay written by Tony Bicât that was commissioned for London Weekend Television. Also directed by Bicât, the film was made over a period of six weeks; mainly in the Cotswolds. The final climax of the film, set during a production of Shakespeare's Richard III, was filmed inside the Cochrane Theatre in London which was made to resemble the Stratford Memorial Theatre for the film.

Star Trap is a detective story featuring two rivals investigating murder that involves the occult. The film stars Daniel Flynn as the Detective, Nicky Henson as Adam Blunt, Philip Sayer as Basil Underwood, Jeananne Crowley as Lady Diana Fortesque, John Pennington as Sir John Fortesque, Frances Tomelty as Hermione Bradstreet, Lucy Benjamin as Nancy, Hugh Simon as Cradock, Allan Surtees as Dr. Gregson, Sandra Yue as the Old Woman, Bryan Matheson as the Judge, Arthur Blake as Jim and Sharon Holm as Sue.
