= Des Moines University =

Private medical school in West Des Moines, Iowa, US

Des Moines University Medicine and Health Sciences
- Former names: Dr. S.S. Still College and Infirmary of Osteopathy & Surgery (1898–1905); Still College (1905–1958); College of Osteopathic Medicine and Surgery (1958–1980); University of Osteopathic Medicine and Health Sciences (1980–1999)
- Type: Private medical school
- Established: 1898
- President: Angela L. Walker Franklin
- Academic staff: 97 full-time 30 part-time
- Administrative staff: 331
- Students: 1,612
- Location: West Des Moines, Iowa, U.S. 41°32′24″N 93°49′08″W
- Campus: Urban, 22 acres (8.9 ha)
- Colors: Purple
- Website: www.dmu.edu

Des Moines University Medicine and Health Sciences (DMU) is a private medical school in West Des Moines, Iowa, United States. Founded in 1898, Des Moines University is the second oldest osteopathic medical school and the fifteenth largest medical school in the United States. DMU's three colleges—the College of Osteopathic Medicine, College of Podiatric Medicine and Surgery, and College of Health Sciences—offer academic degrees in medicine and the health sciences, including master's and doctorate degrees.

Annual enrollment is approximately 1,600 students, and the university has more than over 17,000 total alumni in all 50 states and around the world.

The unaffiliated Des Moines College used the name Des Moines University during the 1920s until its closure in 1929.

== History ==
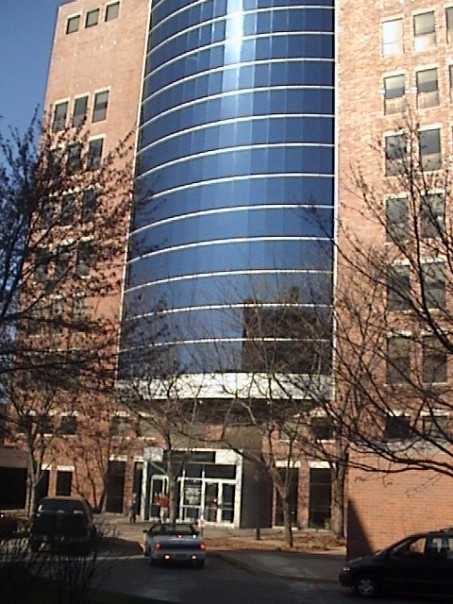
The Des Moines University Medical Clinic

Des Moines University was founded in 1898 as the Dr. S.S. Still College and Infirmary of Osteopathy & Surgery in downtown Des Moines. In 1905, it was renamed Still College. In the 1940s, it was renamed Des Moines Still College of Osteopathy and Surgery. In 1958, the institution was renamed the College of Osteopathic Medicine and Surgery. In 1963, the first satellite clinic was established. In 1971, the Dietz Diagnostic Center, then a specialty clinic, began operation. In 1980, the university was renamed University of Osteopathic Medicine and Health Sciences. In 1972, the school moved to a site at 3200 Grand Avenue in Des Moines.

In 1980, the College of Podiatric Medicine and Surgery and the College of Biological Sciences (now the College of Health Sciences) were both established by the college's board of trustees. In 1981, the university changed its name to the University of Osteopathic Medicine and Health Sciences.

In 1981, the College of Health Sciences established the physician assistant program. In 1988, the physical therapy program was established. In 1986, the 10-story, multi-specialty DMU Clinic opened on campus. Its services include family medicine, foot and ankle care, physical therapy and osteopathic manual medicine.

The college adopted the Des Moines University name on September 18, 1999. In 2003, former Iowa Governor Terry E. Branstad became the university's president. In 2005, the university opened a $24 million Student Education Center, with a medical library, new classrooms, study rooms, a cafeteria and wellness center with a teaching kitchen and basketball court.

After Branstad retired in 2009 in order to pursue running again for governor of Iowa, Stephen Dengle was selected to serve as Interim President for the second time. A year and a half later Angela L. Walker Franklin, Ph.D., became the university's 15th president and the first African American woman to lead a stand-alone medical/health sciences university. In December 2018, she launched Purple and Proud, a $25 million fundraising campaign.

In 2018, DMU became the first medical school to partner with the National Alliance on Mental Illness (NAMI) to offer its provider training program to D.O. students. The university is among the nation's top producers of primary care physicians. DMU is the first and only college or university in the country to twice receive platinum status for its wellness program, the highest honor offered by the Wellness Councils of America.

In 2019, the university moved to expand its campus with additional parking and a generator, which resulted in conflict with neighbors regarding flood risk concerns. Thereafter, the university announced plans to relocate to West Des Moines by 2023. The same year, DMU purchased the 88-acre campus from W&G McKinney Farms. The university relocated to its new West Des Moines campus in June 2023.

== Academics ==
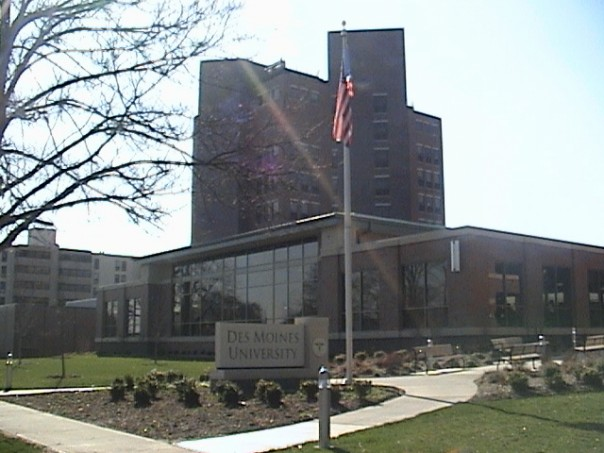
Former campus of Des Moines University

Through its three colleges, DMU offers graduate-level academic programs. Degrees offered at the university include:

- Biomedical Sciences (Doctor of Philosophy and Master of Science)
- Doctor of Occupational Therapy
- Doctor of Osteopathic Medicine
- Doctor of Medical Science
- Doctor of Physical Therapy
- Doctor of Podiatric Medicine
- Master of Health Administration
- Master of Public Health
- Master of Science in Anatomy
- Master of Science in Physician Assistant Studies

=== Accreditation ===
The university is accredited by the Higher Learning Commission (HLC). The College of Osteopathic Medicine is accredited by the Commission on Osteopathic College Accreditation (COCA) of the American Osteopathic Association (AOA). The College of Podiatric Medicine and Surgery is accredited by the Council on Podiatric Medical Education of the American Podiatric Medical Association.

In the College of Health Sciences, the doctor of physical therapy program is accredited by the Commission on Accreditation in Physical Therapy Education. The master's degree program in physician assistant studies is accredited by the Accreditation Review Commission on Education for the Physician Assistant. The master's degree program in health care administration is accredited by the Commission on Accreditation of Healthcare Management Education and the only M.H.A. program selected to partner with the American Osteopathic Association. The master's degree program in public health is accredited by the Council on Education for Public Health.

== Notable alumni ==
- William G. Anderson, civil rights activist, founder and first president of the Albany Movement; first African American to serve as president of the American Osteopathic Association.
- Kevin Moore, professional musician and former keyboardist of the progressive metal band Dream Theater
- Amy Foxx-Orenstein, past president of the American College of Gastroenterology and an associate professor of medicine at Mayo Clinic College of Medicine
- Ivan Raimi, screenwriter

== See also ==
- Sigma Sigma Phi, national osteopathic medicine honors fraternity, officially chartered at the university in 1925
