= Angela R. Hight Walker =

American physicist

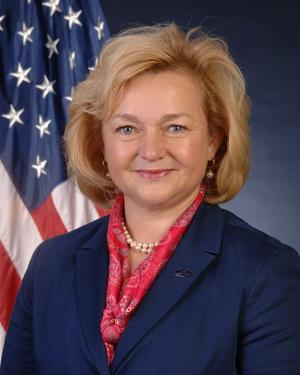
- Education: Capital University (BS); Wesleyan University (PhD)
- Scientific career
- Fields: Physics
- Workplaces: National Institute of Standards and Technology
- Doctoral advisor: Stewart E. Novick

Angela Renee Hight Walker is an American physicist. She is a project leader in the nanoscale spectroscopy group at the National Institute of Standards and Technology. Hight Walker's research includes advancing optical spectroscopic techniques and specifically their applicability to characterize quantum nanomaterials.

== Life ==
Growing up in a small-town in Ohio she did not have many ways to make or connect with role models that were like her. Despite this she found a passion in learning about chemistry and physics. Attending the Capital University in Bexley, Ohio she was able to pursue her budding interest the fields. She then was able to achieve a bachelor's degree in chemistry with a minor in physics.

== Education ==
Hight Walker completed a B.S. in chemistry with a minor in physics at Capital University. She earned a Ph.D. in chemical physics at Wesleyan University. Her 1994 dissertation was titled Fourier transform microwave spectroscopy of multiconformational molecules and van der Waals complexes. Hight Walker's doctoral advisor was Stewart E. Novick. She was a National Research Council postdoctoral fellow in 1994 at National Institute of Standards and Technology (NIST).

== Career ==
Hight Walker works as a research physicist at NIST. She served as a program analyst in NIST Office of the Director from 2000 to 2001 and was an invited researcher at Laboratoire Aimé Cotton in Orsay from 2005 to 2006. She is a project leader. Her research focuses on advancing optical spectroscopic techniques and specifically their applicability to characterize quantum nanomaterials. Hight Walker’s research team has developed resonance Raman capabilities and unique hyphenated Raman techniques such as atomic force microscopy (AFM)-Raman and magneto-Raman, where the samples are probed as a function of laser wavelength, temperature, magnetic field and back gating. She applies these novel measurement capabilities to study the underlying photophysics of nanomaterials, specifically noble and transition metal nanoparticles, carbon nanotubes, graphene and other 2D materials resulting in over 140 publications and 3800 citations. The future focus of Hight Walker’s effort is pushing the forefront of optical methods to characterize the magnetic phenomenon in layered systems.

Hight Walker is involved in international documentary standards activities focused on nanotechnology, leading the US technical committee on Measurement and Characterization to ISO TC229. Also, she is a member of two VAMAS committees, TWA 41 and 42, where several international round robin studies are underway to validate measurement protocols. Hight Walker leads a team composed of experts from the National Metrology Institutes concerned with enabling SI-traceable, Raman measurements.

Hight Walker is involved with the American Physical Society, having held leadership roles throughout the Topical Group on Measurement and Instrumentation. She co-organized the APS 2014 Women in Physics conference which was jointly sponsored by the University of Maryland and NIST and will do so again in January 2020.

=== Mentoring ===
Through on- and offsite demonstrations and lectures, she has engaged in promoting interest in science among the young and underrepresented. Hight Walker has hosted 14 NRC postdoctoral fellows and countless students in her lab during her 25-year career at NIST.

== Recognition ==
She was named a Fellow of the American Physical Society in 2022 "for pioneering advancements to the measurement science of Raman spectroscopy for quantifying light-matter interactions of low-dimensional materials, including nanoparticles, carbon nanotubes, graphene, and 2D materials, and outstanding mentorship of women in physics". In 2023 Hight Walker was awarded Fellow of the American Association for the Advancement of Science.
