= Mark Horenstein =

American electrical engineer

Mark Horenstein from the Boston University, Boston, MA was named Fellow of the Institute of Electrical and Electronics Engineers (IEEE) in 2016 for contributions to the modeling and measurements of electrostatics in industrial processes.
