= Brigitta P. Kovarskaia =

Soviet-Moldovan physicist, computer scientist, historian (1930–1998)

- Бригитта Пинкусовна Коварская
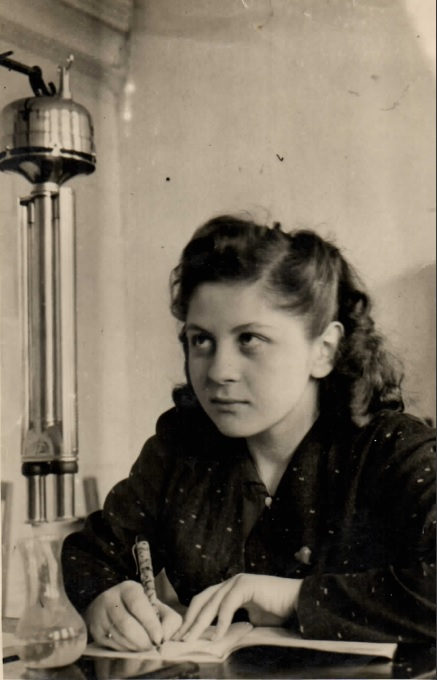
- Kowarskaia in 1947
- Born: Brigitta Pinkusovna Orenstein; 7 March 1930; Chișinău, Moldavian Autonomous Soviet Socialist Republic
- Died: 7 January 1998 (aged 67)
- Other names: Brigitta Pinkusowna Kowarskaja, Brigitta Pinkusovna Kovarskaya; Brigitte Kovarska, Brighitta Covarschi
- Education: Moldova State University
- Occupations: Physicist, computer scientist, educator, local historian
- Spouse: Victor Kovarski (m. 1952–)
- Children: 2

Brigitta Pinkusovna Kovarskaia (Russian: Бригитта Пинкусовна Коварская, romanized: Brigitta Pinkusovna Kovarskaya, née Orenstein; 7 March 1930 – 7 January 1998) was a Soviet Moldovan physicist, computer scientist, educator, and local historian.

== Life and career ==
Brigitta Kovarskaia was born as Brigitta Pinkusovna Orenstein on 7 March 1930, in Chișinău, Moldavian Autonomous Soviet Socialist Republic. She was daughter of Blyuma Perezovna Manzovich, and the accountant Pinkus Abramovich Orenstein.

During German–Soviet War in World War II, Kovarskaia's maternal grandparents died in the Kishinev Ghetto (also known as Chișinău Ghetto), while Brigitta and her parents survived the war in the evacuation to Semipalatinsk, and they returned to Chișinău in August 1944.

She studied at the faculty of physics and mathematics of the Moldova State University in Chișinău, and graduated in 1952. She graduated from the PhD program in 1967, in the quantum chemistry department of the Moldova State University, majoring in "physical chemistry".

She married the physicist Victor Kovarski in 1952, he was the son of Anatolie Kovarski a Soviet Moldovan academic in the field of plant selection and genetics. They had two children, a son and a daughter.

From 1979 to 1985 Kovarskaia worked as a senior assistant in the department of informatics of the institute of mathematics of the Academy of Sciences of Moldova, and from 1985 to 1998 as a senior assistant in the institute of history of the Academy of Sciences of Moldova.

In the 1990s, she published essays on the history of Bessarabian Jews, including those from Chișinău. Additionally she authored books on embroidery, knitting, and textbooks.
