= Gorenstein =

Gorenstein is an Ashkenazi Jewish surname, a Russified form of Hornstein. Notable people with the surname include:

- Daniel Gorenstein (1923–1992), American mathematician
- Eli Gorenstein (born 1952), Israeli actor, voice actor, singer and cellist
- Friedrich Gorenstein (1932–2002), Ukrainian author and screenwriter
- Hilda Goldblatt Gorenstein (1905–1998), artist and inspiration for the documentary I Remember Better When I Paint
- Mark Gorenstein (born 1946), Russian conductor

== See also ==
- Horenstein
