= Anor Londo =

Fictional city in the Dark Souls series

- Dark Souls location
- A view of Anor Londo as seen in Dark Souls
- First appearance: Dark Souls (2011)
- Last appearance: Dark Souls III (2016)
- Created by: Hidetaka Miyazaki, Masanori Waragai
- Genre: Action role-playing game

In-universe information
- Type: Capital city of Lordran (Dark Souls); District of Irithyll of the Boreal Valley (Dark Souls III)
- Ruled by: Gwyn, Lord of Sunlight (before Dark Souls); Dark Sun Gwyndolin (Dark Souls); Aldrich, Devourer of Gods (Dark Souls III)
- Location: Lordran
- Characters: Dark Sun Gwyndolin; Princess Gwynevere; Dragonslayer Ornstein; Executioner Smough; Pontiff Sulhyvan; Aldrich, Devourer of Gods

Anor Londo is a fictional city in the Dark Souls series of action role-playing games. Appearing in both Dark Souls and Dark Souls III, it is the capital of the kingdom of Lordran and the former seat of the power of the deities of the Dark Souls world. By the time of Dark Souls, it has long become an abandoned lost city, populated almost exclusively by threats to the player character.

Going through Anor Londo is a requirement in both games; in Dark Souls, the protagonist must explore it to retrieve a powerful magic item, the Lordvessel, that allows them to progress the story. Originally bathed in sunlight, Anor Londo has become a nightly realm of cold in Dark Souls III, which takes place many years after the original, and now forms the upper part of a new city, Irithyll of the Boreal Valley, built but also abandoned between the two games. In Dark Souls III the protagonist must go to Anor Londo to slay a "Lord of Cinder", the boss Aldrich, Devourer of Gods.

Anor Londo has been cited by critics as one of the best and most memorable areas in the Dark Souls games for its beautiful design, environmental storytelling, and, in the first game, its final boss battle against the duo of Dragon Slayer Ornstein and Executioner Smough; the area's high difficulty in the original Dark Souls, most notably said boss fight and a climbing section where the player must overcome two powerful archers while avoiding a fall, was noted by many, and the Ornstein and Smough boss battle is considered one of the best and most memorable in video game history.

== Level content ==
=== Dark Souls ===
The player character arrives in Anor Londo after completing Sen's Fortress, a location that opens after they have rung both "Bells of Awakening". After dispatching the boss of Sen's Fortress, the Iron Golem, the player is carried over the otherwise sealed-off wall of Anor Londo by a pack of winged demons. As one of the only non-ruined areas of Lordran, Anor Londo stands in contrast to the other levels of the game.

Following their arrival, the player must then travel to Gwyn's Keep to obtain the Lordvessel, passing many obstacles. This includes a duo of Silver Knight archers that guard the buttress leading to a side balcony entrance of the Keep. After fighting their way through the Keep itself, the player must face the level's dual bosses, Dragonslayer Ornstein and Executioner Smough, to gain access to Gwynevere, Princess of Sunlight. She awards the player the Lordvessel, allowing the player to warp away from the level.

Both of the characters are fought in a long, rectangular and empty cathedral, with parallel sets of pillars on either side. The player can either attempt to block Smough with the pillars while attacking Ornstein, or attack Smough while dodging Ornstein, a more difficult task when alone. If Ornstein is defeated first, Smough crushes him with his hammer, and gains the power of lightning. If Smough is defeated first, Ornstein suddenly grows to immense size while retaining his former speed. When the second boss is defeated, the player can purchase the armor of that boss, and in Ornstein's case, obtains the Leo Ring.

=== Dark Souls III ===
When the player revisits Anor Londo, it is bathed in moonlight, frozen over, and has fallen to visible levels of decay. Pathways near the central elevator have crumbled, and force the player to explore a different side of the city. A new path exists where a former bonfire once stood. The terrain of Lordran has also clearly shifted heavily over time, with large chunks of Anor Londo and its surrounding walls having vanished, and a new palace being visible in the distance.

As the player progresses into Lord Gwyn's keep, parts are blocked off by collapse, and the entire location is waterlogged, full of debris, but decorated with new features such as cloth curtains. In the same room where Ornstein and Smough were formerly fought, the player must face Aldrich, Devourer of Gods, in order to obtain his power and return it to Firelink Shrine.

== Plot ==
=== Dark Souls ===
Anor Londo was founded by Gwyn, ruler of the Gods, to consolidate his power after ushering in the Age of Fire. Many centuries later, upon the fading of the First Flame, he was forced to leave the city along with half of his Silver Knight army to rekindle the flame. By the time of Dark Souls, the only remaining deity in Anor Londo is Gwyn's son (but whom he raised as his daughter) Gwyndolin, a powerful sorcerer with strong affinity with the Moon and who presides over the Darkmoon covenant. Gwyndolin created the illusion of sunlight, as well as Princess Gwynevere, to compel the Chosen Undead to defeat Gwyn and rekindle the First Flame yet again. If the player attacks Gwynevere, the illusion is shattered and the city reverts to its true appearance, shrouded in darkness.

=== Dark Souls III ===
By the time of Dark Souls III, the city was repopulated and renamed Irithyll. It is taken over by a dark sorcerer named Sulyvahn, who enslaved the city's populace and turned them into monstrosities. Sulyvahn would later be allied with Aldrich, Devourer of Gods, a former human cleric who mutated into an amorphous blob due to his cannibalism, and one of the five Lords of Cinder resurrected to link the First Flame. The player finds Aldrich housed within the cathedral of Gwyn's ruined keep, in the process of slowly consuming the very body and soul of the still-living Gwyndolin.

== Development ==
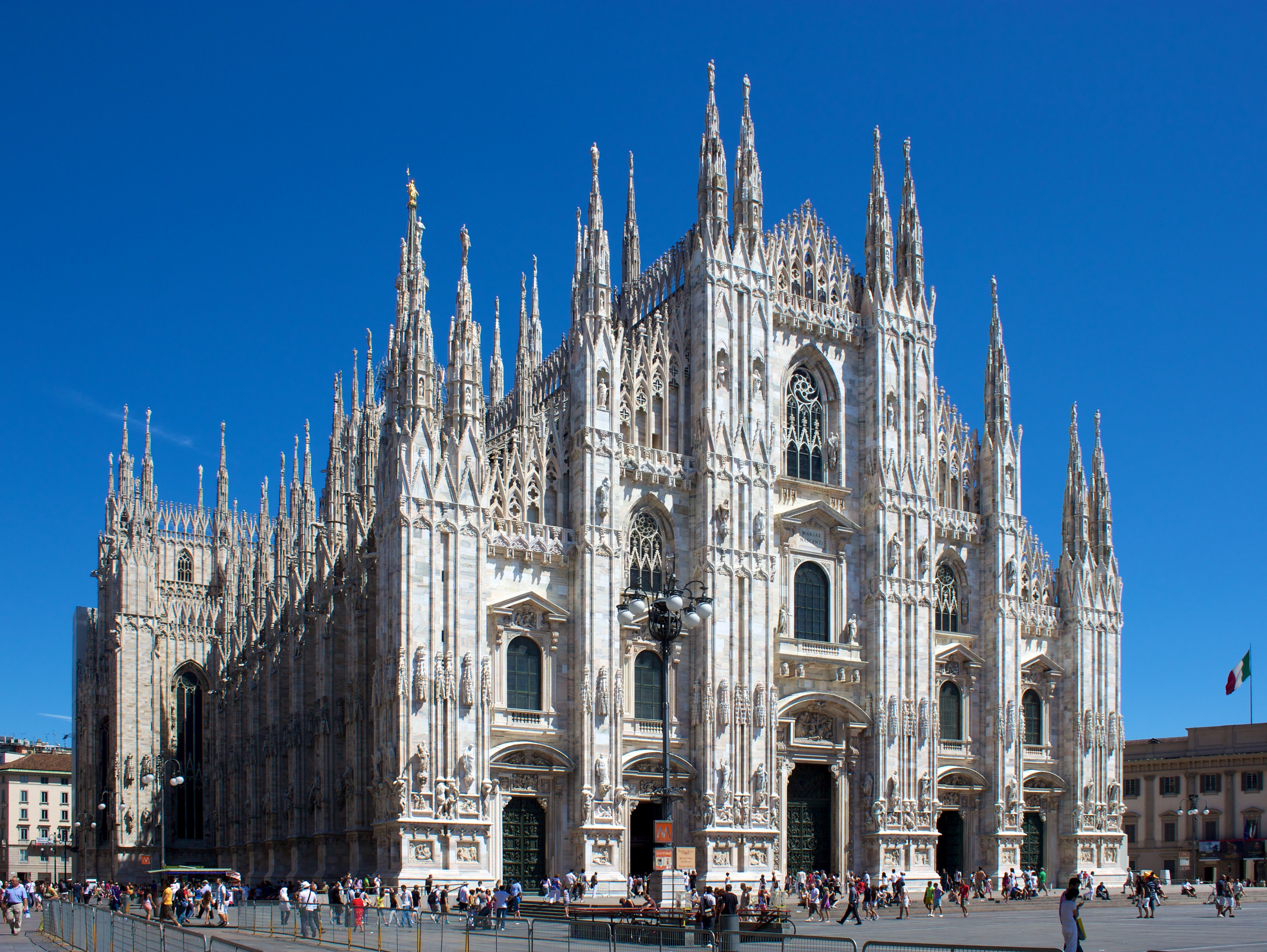
The exterior design of the main location in Anor Londo was inspired by the Milan Cathedral.

Anor Londo was designed to feel like a reward after completing Sen's Fortress, but also presented no clear path to the player, forcing them to take a number of side paths, like walking up the flying buttresses. The city's spiral staircases were meant to represent life.

The city's design was inspired by that of Milan Cathedral, which was visited in person by Dark Souls designer Masanori Waragai. The game's director, Hidetaka Miyazaki, felt that the sense of excitement the player feels upon entry to Anor Londo does not last for the level's entirety.

== Reception ==
Edge called Anor Londo "as beautiful as it is deadly" and "where Dark Souls casts off restraint". Comparing it to the Divine Comedy, and the strata traversed by Dante in the poem, they equated Anor Londo with Heaven, and that it therefore "makes sense that it's the one area in the game you are incapable of reaching by your own agency". Calling the first glimpses of Anor Londo "dazzling", they state that since Dark Souls is "so bleak at times, so starved of warmth and light", the city's beauty "seems almost eye-shadingly pornographic".

Kotaku cited the environmental storytelling of the city's design, where the obvious path forward is blocked, showing the player they do not belong there. Patrick Klepek of Kotaku called the appearance of Anor Londo in Dark Souls III a "highlight" of his playthrough and the city's architecture "beautiful" and "haunting".

Den of Geek called Anor Londo one of "gaming's greatest levels", saying that it "represents the core appeal of Dark Souls", by being designed to "intimidate and impress" the player, as well as being full of mysteries. Cian Maher of The Washington Post called Anor Londo one of the "eight wonders of the virtual world", calling the "gorgeously lit skyline" "striking" in comparison to the darkness of the rest of the game, and stating that "the people - or deities - who inhabit the city also contribute to its sublimity." Eurogamer called revisiting Anor Londo in Dark Souls III a "surreal, melancholy experience" that "ranks among Dark Souls III's many high points", but also "shows how the series line has evolved, both technically and in its visual direction".

Several critics consider the Ornstein and Smough encounter to be one of the most memorable and significant boss fights in video games. IGN's Chiloi Rad calling it the "singularly defining encounter in the whole of the first Dark Souls", and the staff considered it one of the most unforgettable video game moments of all time. Mark Serrels of Kotaku called the fight "perhaps the most notorious boss battle in Dark Souls", and stated that he felt "pure zen" when he beat it, confident that he was going to win after many repeated attempts.

Joe Donnelly of PC Gamer called the duo one of the best Dark Souls bosses, and "one of the series' most epic showdowns", adding that "my own inability to topple them keeps me coming back for more". Derek Swinhart of Game Informer noted that Ornstein and Smough "have become referenced far outside of their origins", adding that the fight "remains challenging and incredibly satisfying years later, and even veteran players can't let their guard down".

The Silver Knight archers of Anor Londo were criticized by PC Gamer's Joe Donnelly as the moment he fell out of love with the game, saying that the game never felt unfair until that moment.
