= Norbert Hornstein =

American linguist

Norbert Hornstein is a Canadian linguist and professor emeritus of linguistics at the University of Maryland, working within the framework of generative grammar. His notable contributions include work addressing the nature of logical form.

Hornstein graduated from McGill University in 1975 and received his Ph.D. from Harvard University in 1979. He was an assistant professor at Columbia University, and has been at the University of Maryland since 1983. His father was Michal Hornstein.
