= Dark Souls (video game) =

2011 video game

- Cover art used outside of Japan
- Developer: FromSoftware (Note: Dark Souls: Remastered was developed by QLOC for PlayStation 4, Windows and Xbox One, and by Virtuos for Nintendo Switch.)
- Publisher: Namco Bandai Games (Note: Released under the Bandai brand name.): JP: FromSoftware
- Director: Hidetaka Miyazaki
- Producers: Hidetaka Miyazaki; Daisuke Uchiyama; Kei Hirono
- Programmer: Jun Ito
- Artist: Makoto Sato
- Writer: Hidetaka Miyazaki
- Composer: Motoi Sakuraba
- Series: Dark Souls
- Platforms: PlayStation 3; Xbox 360; Windows; Remastered; Windows; PlayStation 4; Xbox One; Nintendo Switch
- Release: September 22, 2011: PlayStation 3, Xbox 360; JP: September 22, 2011 (Note: For the PlayStation 3 only); NA: October 4, 2011; AU: October 6, 2011; EU: October 7, 2011 Windows; AU: August 23, 2012; NA/EU: August 24, 2012; JP: October 25, 2012; Remastered; PS4, Windows, Xbox One; JP: May 24, 2018; WW: May 25, 2018 Switch; WW: October 19, 2018
- Genre: Action role-playing
- Modes: Single-player, multiplayer

Dark Souls (Note: Japanese: ダークソウル, Hepburn: Dāku Sōru) is a 2011 action role-playing game developed by FromSoftware and published by Namco Bandai Games. It is the first game in the Dark Souls series and a spiritual successor to FromSoftware's Demon's Souls. Set in the kingdom of Lordran, the game follows the Chosen Undead, who escapes from the Northern Undead Asylum and travels through Lordran to discover the fate of the undead. Gameplay centres on exploration, deliberate combat, character customisation, and online interactions including messages, cooperative play, and invasions.

After its original release for PlayStation 3 and Xbox 360, a Windows port featuring additional content, titled the Prepare to Die Edition, was released in August 2012. That additional content was released separately for the PlayStation 3 and Xbox 360 versions as the downloadable content pack Artorias of the Abyss in October 2012. A remastered version was released for PlayStation 4, Windows, Xbox One, and Nintendo Switch in 2018.

Dark Souls has been cited as one of the greatest video games ever made. Critics praised the depth of its combat, intricate level design, and use of flavour text, while responses to its high level of difficulty were divided. The original Windows version was less well received, with criticism directed at technical issues. By April 2013, the game had sold 2.37 million copies worldwide. Its success led to two sequels, Dark Souls II (2014) and Dark Souls III (2016).

== Gameplay ==
A boss fight from the game's Artorias of the Abyss expansion.

Dark Souls is a third-person action role-playing game. The player explores Lordran, a single interconnected world divided into distinct regions and linked by unlockable shortcuts. Areas can often be approached through multiple routes, although some paths are locked until the player meets certain prerequisites. The game encourages cautious exploration, as progress often depends on learning enemy placement, attack patterns, and alternative routes through repeated attempts.

Bonfires serve as checkpoints and sites for character management. Resting at a bonfire restores the player character's health and Estus Flask charges, and allows the player to level up, attune magic, and repair or upgrade equipment. Resting also respawns most enemies, excluding bosses, mini-bosses, and killed non-player characters.

Combat involves melee and ranged weapons, defensive manoeuvres, and magic. The player can block, dodge roll, backstep, parry, or attack with weapons such as swords, spears, bows, and crossbows. Magic is divided into sorceries, miracles, and pyromancies. Unlike many role-playing games, spells are not cast from a mana pool; each attuned spell instead has a limited number of uses, which are restored when the player rests at a bonfire. Equipment and combat abilities can be altered through levelling, weapon upgrades, armour, and equipment choices.

Defeating enemies grants souls, which function as both currency and experience points. When the player dies, the character returns to the last bonfire and drops any carried souls and humanity at the place of death. The player can recover them by reaching the resulting bloodstain, but loses them permanently after dying again before doing so.

=== Multiplayer ===
Dark Souls integrates online features into the single-player world. The player can see ghostly images of other players, activate bloodstains that show how other players died, and leave messages using preset phrases. Direct multiplayer includes cooperative summoning and player-versus-player invasions.

The humanity system controls access to some online features. Dying in human form returns the character to undead form. The player can restore human form at a bonfire by consuming humanity, allowing them to summon other players and certain non-player characters for assistance, but also exposing them to invasions. The game can still be completed in undead form.

Covenants, optional factions encountered during the game, can affect multiplayer goals, rewards, and interactions. Some covenants encourage cooperative play, while others focus on invasions or other forms of player-versus-player interaction.

In January 2022, online services for the Windows versions of the Dark Souls games were disabled after a security exploit was found. Online multiplayer for the original Windows Prepare to Die Edition was later permanently disabled, while online features for Dark Souls: Remastered on Windows were restored in November 2022.

== Synopsis ==
=== Setting ===
Dark Souls is set in Lordran, a decaying kingdom near the end of the Age of Fire. In the opening cutscene, the world is first described as an unchanging Age of Ancients inhabited by Everlasting Dragons. The First Flame then appears, bringing disparity: heat and cold, life and death, and light and dark. Several beings find powerful souls within the flame, including Gwyn, Lord of Sunlight; the Witch of Izalith; Gravelord Nito, the first of the dead; and the Furtive Pygmy, who finds the Dark Soul.

Gwyn, the Witch, Nito, and the scaleless dragon Seath overthrow the dragons, beginning the Age of Fire. As the First Flame fades, Gwyn sacrifices himself to preserve it. The game begins much later, when humans marked by the Darksign are cursed to resurrect after death and eventually lose their minds, becoming hollow.

=== Plot ===
The opening cutscene establishes the premise of the game. Everlasting Dragons once ruled over the world during the "Age of Ancients." A primordial fire known as the First Flame manifests in the world, establishing a distinction between life and death, and light and dark. A being known as Gwyn happens upon the First Flame and along with his allies use their new power to destroy the dragons and take control over the world, while the Furtive Pygmy is said to be forgotten, and thus begins the "Age of Fire." Over time, as the First Flame begins to fade while humans rise in power, Gwyn sacrifices himself to prolong the Age of Fire. The main story takes place towards the end of this second Age of Fire, at which point humanity is said to be afflicted with an undead curse related to a symbol on their bodies known as the Darksign. Those humans afflicted with the undead curse were perpetually resurrect after death until they eventually lose their minds, a process referred to as "hollowing."

The player character is a cursed undead, locked away in an undead asylum. After escaping the asylum, the player travels to Lordran to ring the Bells of Awakening. The bells awaken Kingseeker Frampt who tells the player to ascend to Anor Londo, the home of the Gods. After fighting through the nearly abandoned city, the player discovers the daughter of Gwyn, Gwynevere, who instructs the player to succeed Lord Gwyn and fulfill the prophecy. To accomplish this, the player must acquire the souls of Gwynn's primordial allies and return them to the flame in order to rekindle it. Optionally, the player may encounter Darkstalker Kaathe, who encourages the player not to link the fire but to let it die out and usher in the Age of Dark instead. After acquiring all the Lord Souls, the player travels to the Kiln of the First Flame to battle Gwyn, who had been reduced to a soulless husk. Once Gwyn has been defeated, the player has the choice of linking the flame to preserve the Age of Fire or letting it die out to instigate the Age of Dark.

=== Artorias of the Abyss ===
In the Artorias of the Abyss expansion, the player character is drawn into the past to the ruined land of Oolacile. There, they attempt to rescue Princess Dusk of Oolacile and investigate the fate of Knight Artorias, who had sought to confront the Abyss. The player character finds Artorias corrupted after being defeated by Manus, Father of the Abyss. After defeating Artorias and Manus, the player character rescues Dusk, while present-day legends continue to credit Artorias with stopping the Abyss.

== Development ==
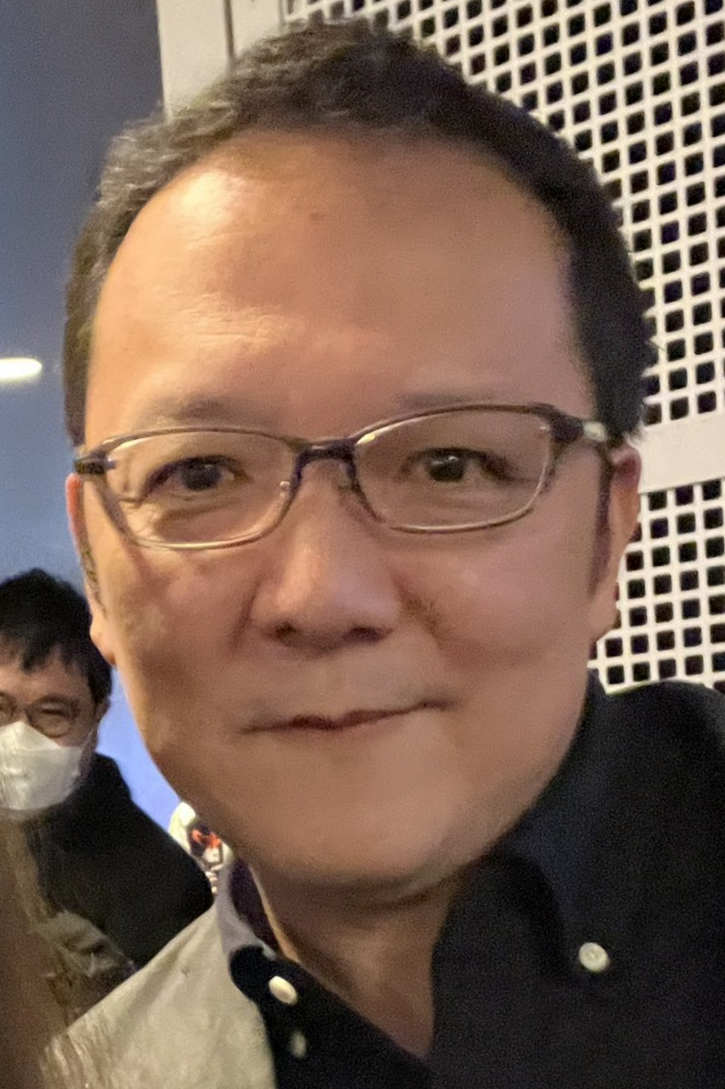
Hidetaka Miyazaki, the game's director and producer

Dark Souls was developed by FromSoftware and directed by Hidetaka Miyazaki, who also served as one of its producers. The game followed FromSoftware's 2009 action role-playing game Demon's Souls. Before release, Miyazaki said that Dark Souls was not a sequel to Demon's Souls, but a new game with similar concepts made by the same director and producers. Namco Bandai producers Daisuke Uchiyama and Kei Hirono similarly described it as a spiritual successor rather than a direct sequel, while noting that it shared much of the same development team and gameplay concept. Namco Bandai Games handled international publishing, while FromSoftware published the game in Japan.

Miyazaki said that the team intended to retain and increase the challenge associated with Demon's Souls, but not simply by making the game harder. Instead, the goal was to give players freedom to experiment with strategies and feel rewarded for overcoming obstacles. He described bonfires, referred to before release as "Beacon Fires", as recovery and respawn points that also served as rare places of warmth in the game's dark fantasy world.

The game's art direction was developed through a mixture of broad prompts and direct oversight. Miyazaki said that, during the early concept stage, he gave artists simple "image words" and allowed them to produce designs freely, after which he selected, revised, or incorporated their ideas. When designs had a more specific gameplay or worldbuilding function, he gave more detailed instructions about their use and placement. Miyazaki said he worked directly with each designer rather than assigning a single intermediary to manage the visual direction.

Miyazaki described the game's visual design as organised around several broad themes: gods and knights centred on Anor Londo, chaos and demons centred on Lost Izalith, death and decay centred on Gravelord Nito, and the ancient dragons. He also said he sought "refinement and elegance" in the game's designs, even in grotesque or decayed areas. Some locations drew on real-world architecture; a designer cited Milan Cathedral as a reference for Anor Londo's buttresses, while Miyazaki said that New Londo Ruins was based partly on Mont-Saint-Michel in Normandy, France.

Miyazaki later said that the manga series Berserk had influenced Dark Souls, although he said gameplay remained his first priority during the design process.

== Marketing and release ==
Dark Souls was first released for PlayStation 3 in Japan in September 2011, followed by releases for PlayStation 3 and Xbox 360 in Western regions the following month. (Note: The original Japanese release was for PlayStation 3 only.)

After the console release, fans campaigned for a Windows version. In April 2012, Namco Bandai Games confirmed Dark Souls: Prepare to Die Edition for Windows; Game Informer reported that an online petition with almost 100,000 signatures had played a major role in the decision to port the game. Producer Daisuke Uchiyama said that FromSoftware had not originally planned a Windows version and had limited experience porting games to PC, resulting in a version that was closer to a console port than a PC-specific conversion.

In August 2012, the Windows version was released and included new areas, bosses, enemies, non-player characters, equipment, and an online player-versus-player matchmaking system. The additional content was later released for the PlayStation 3 and Xbox 360 versions as the downloadable content pack Artorias of the Abyss. The announcement that the Windows version would use Games for Windows – Live for online play and digital rights management prompted criticism from some players, including a petition asking Namco Bandai to use Steamworks instead.

After the Windows release, a user-created mod named DSFix was released to address the port's fixed internal rendering resolution. In December 2014, an update allowed players to migrate the Steam version from Games for Windows – Live to Steamworks while retaining save data and achievements; Steamworks became the default version in February 2015. In April 2016, Dark Souls became available on Xbox One through backward compatibility.

A remastered version, titled Dark Souls: Remastered, was released for PlayStation 4, Windows, and Xbox One on May 25, 2018, and for Nintendo Switch on October 19, 2018. It includes the base game and Artorias of the Abyss. The remaster added technical and multiplayer changes, including higher resolution options, a 60 frames-per-second target on PlayStation 4, Windows, and Xbox One, dedicated servers, and support for up to six online players; the Switch version runs at 30 frames per second.

== Reception ==
=== Original release ===
Reception of Dark Souls

Aggregate score
Aggregator	Score
Metacritic	PC: 85/100; PS3: 89/100; X360: 89/100

Review scores
Publication	Score
1Up.com	A
Edge	10/10 (Note: Originally scored 9/10 before revisal)
Eurogamer	9/10
Famitsu	9/10, 9/10, 9/10, 10/10
Game Informer	8.75/10
GamePro	5/5
GameSpot	9.5/10
GamesTM	9/10
IGN	9/10
Joystiq	4.5/5
PALGN	10/10

Edit on Wikidata

Dark Souls received positive reviews from critics upon its release. One of the reviewers for Dark Souls described it as "a very hardcore dark-fantasy [role-playing game]" that is "role-playing right down to the roots", and stated that the "massive field map and powerful enemies serve to rev up both your sense of adventure and your sense of dread." Another reviewer said that "the sheer happiness you get after the trial-and-error pays off and you overcome the challenge is absolutely impossible to replicate."

GameSpot praised the online system and the sense of jubilation when conquering boss fights after numerous failed attempts. They also suggested that casual gamers may struggle to progress, whereas role-playing game enthusiasts will thrive on the difficulty. IGN complimented the level design, variety, strong emphasis on online features, excessively dark tone and atmosphere, and deep gameplay. While praising the extreme difficulty, they stated that "there's a difference between punishing, and downright unfair." Eurogamer also applauded the level design and atmosphere while noting that the game's difficulty might not appeal to casual gamers.

Edge retroactively awarded the game 10 out of 10 in their October 2013 20th anniversary issue, stating that the breadth and quality of the game's design had overruled complaints about its difficulty.

Game Informer Phil Kollar opined that "the frustration in Dark Souls arises from how [late '00s and early 2010s] games have conditioned us. Gamers are used to handholding tutorials that walk you through every aspect of a game’s mechanics." While complimenting the game's notoriously steep difficulty curve, Kollar was less favourable toward its "overall lack of direction".

In a review of Dark Souls in Black Gate, Connor Gormley said "I can't help but smile at all the things I've done in this game, from the serious and atmospheric, to the actually kind of stupid, like losing a fist fight with a giant mushroom man who I like to imagine has a thick cockney accent. I've given very few examples of the game's lore by design, because half of the fun is finding that out for yourself, at least if you're in it for the fantasy. It's an experience, one fueled by creativity and ingenuity, and it's one that I urge you to go out and at least try, regular gamer or not."

Namco Bandai's yearly financial report stated that the game sold 1.19 million units in the United States and Europe by March 2012. FromSoftware announced in April 2013 that the game had sold 2.37 million units worldwide.

Game writer Erik Wolpaw, an early proponent of the Souls series going back to 2009's Demon's Souls, said the game was his favourite of 2011.

=== Later releases ===
Dark Souls Remastered

Aggregate scores
Aggregator	Score
Metacritic	PC: 84/100; PS4: 84/100; XONE: 86/100; NS: 83/100
OpenCritic	88% recommend (Note: Based on 103 reviews)

Review scores
Publication	Score
Destructoid	9/10
Game Informer	8.75/10
IGN	9.5/10

In GameSpy's review, the original Windows port was referred to as "shabby", citing the game's limit of 30 frames per second, poor mouse and keyboard controls, and nonadjustable resolution. However, the expanded content was praised, giving the game an overall favourable review.

Eurogamer commented on the quality of the port, stating: "Dark Souls: Prepare to Die Edition does not come with the technical options you would expect from a well-engineered PC game, because it's a port of a console game, and that's all FromSoftware ever promised to deliver. Anyone who passes up Dark Souls for this reason is cutting off their nose to spite their neckbeard of a face." One of the producers of Dark Souls II, Takeshi Miyazoe, responded to the criticism of the PC version by saying:

This is going to sound bad but our main priority was to get the game onto the PC as fast as possible, because people wanted it on the PC. The PC market in Japan is so minimal that originally there were no plans to make it on the PC, but with the strong petition from the North American and European fans, even with the lack of experience of working on a PC platform we still did our best to try to get it out as fast as possible. [The problems] were expected to a certain extent. We did know there were PC-specific features like key-mapping and use of the mouse and keyboard, high resolution and higher frame rate, stuff like that, but... It's not that we ignored it, but it would have taken too much time for us to implement it, test it and get it up to the level people expected. It was more of a publisher (Namco Bandai) decision to say, "Guys, don't worry about this – let's just get it out and see how this works on PC."

Dark Souls: Remastered received "generally favorable" reviews from critics, according to review aggregator Metacritic. Critics praised the improved visuals and performance, while criticism was directed towards the lack of an effective anti-cheat system and the PC version's price despite few significant changes. It sold 71,739 copies in Japan during the week of its release, making it the best-selling game in the country at the time.

=== Awards ===
Game Revolution gave Dark Souls the Community Choice Game of the Year award. IncGamers also gave it the "Game of the Year" award. Q-Games' Dylan Cuthbert and Double Fine Productions' Brad Muir chose Dark Souls as Game of the Year. Electronic Gaming Monthly's Eric L. Patterson chose it as Game of the Year. GameTrailers gave it the "Best Role-Playing Game" award while also nominating it for the "Best Multiplayer Game", "Best Trailer", and "Game of the Year" awards. GameZone gave the game the "Best Action/Adventure" award and chose it as the runner-up for the "Best RPG" award. At the 15th Annual Interactive Achievement Awards (now known as the D.I.C.E. Awards), the Academy of Interactive Arts & Sciences nominated Dark Souls for "Role-Playing/Massively Multiplayer Game of the Year".

The Daily Telegraph gave the game the "Best Integration of Online Features" award and nominated it for the awards of "Best Director" (Hidetaka Miyazaki), "Best Level Design", "Best Sound Design", "Best Original Score" (Motoi Sakuraba), "Best Developer" (FromSoftware), and "Game of the Year". TeamXbox gave it an honourable mention as the runner-up for the "Best RPG" award. 1UP.com gave it the "Most Rewarding Game" award. Game Informer gave it the award for "Best Boss Fight" (Sif). It also received the "Best Boss Fights" awards from GameSpot, including the Editors' Choice and Readers' Choice awards. Famitsu gave it an Award of Excellence in its 2012 awards ceremony.

In 2013, Digital Spy named Dark Souls the best game of the seventh console generation. In 2014, Edge magazine named Dark Souls the best game of the seventh generation of game consoles, noting that while some may initially tire of it, "We've yet to meet a single player for whom persistence has not been enough to transform apathy into all-consuming love." In September 2015, Dark Souls topped the Edge's special issue The 100 Greatest Videogames.

In 2015, the game placed first on GamesRadar+'s "The 100 best games ever" list. The game was also put first on USgamer's The 15 Best Games Since 2000 list. The game was titled the "Best RPG on PC" by Rock, Paper, Shotgun. In 2016, Dark Souls placed fifth on PC Gamer's "Best RPGs of all time" list. In 2021, the game was voted the Ultimate Game of All Time at the Golden Joystick Awards.

=== Legacy ===
Dark Souls has been cited as one of the greatest video games of all time. Due to its design and philosophy, it is often cited as an essential instance of video games as an art form. It is also considered one of the most influential video games of its generation. It was voted the Ultimate Game of All Time at the 2021 Golden Joystick Awards.

Games cited to have been influenced by Dark Souls include Destiny, Alienation, Lords of the Fallen, The Surge, Salt and Sanctuary, Shovel Knight, Titan Souls, Enter the Gungeon, The Witcher 3: Wild Hunt, Nioh, and God of War, as well as features used on the PlayStation 4 console. Dark Souls was also cited as an inspiration for the television show Stranger Things.
