= Bella Salomon =

Jewish collector of music

Bella Salomon (née Itzig) (8 November 1749 - 9 March 1824) was a prominent Jewish collector of music. Along with her more famous sister Sara Levy she was influential in maintaining the musical legacy of Johann Sebastian Bach. She was also the grandmother of Felix Mendelssohn.

== Family life ==
Bella was born in Berlin on 8 November 1749. She was one of the fifteen children of the Prussian Court Jew and banker Daniel Itzig and his wife Mariane (Miriam), née Wulff. She was the sister of Fanny von Arnstein, Cäcilie von Eskeles (Zippora Wulff) and Sara Levy. Bella was also known in her family as Bilka and Babette.

Bella married Levin Jacob Salomon (1738-1783) with whom she had four children: Rebekah (born 1776) married Bernhard Seligman. Lea (born 1777) married Abraham Mendelssohn, and their children were Fanny and Felix Mendelssohn. Jakob Salomon Bartholdy (born 1779) became a Prussian diplomat and patron of the arts. Bella’s last child was Isaac (born 1782).

== Musical interests ==
Bella’s parents placed great value on ensuring that all of their children had a broad-based education, in which music in particular played a central role. From the early years of her childhood the music of Johann Sebastian Bach was cultivated in the family, and her father chose Bach’s pupil Johann Philipp Kirnberger to be piano teacher both to Bella and her older sister Johannet.

Both Bella and Sara were involved in the activities of the Sing-Akademie zu Berlin. While Sara performed on the harpsichord, Bella sang in the choir.

In 1824 Bella Salomon made Felix a gift of a copyist's manuscript score of J.S. Bach's St. Matthew Passion. It is likely that this was a present for his fifteenth birthday. Mendelssohn devoted the next five years to studying and understanding the work before putting on the first Berlin performance of it in 1829. The work proved immensely popular and this concert is often considered to be the first important step in the revival of public appreciation of Bach, and of other early composers more generally.

== Religion ==
While many prominent German Jews converted to Christianity in the early nineteenth century, Bella, like her sister Sara, remained faithful to Judaism. Bella disowned her son Jakob when he converted to Christianity in 1805. She apparently did not react in a similar way when her daughter Lea and her husband Abraham converted, although they were living in her mansion at the time. Her gift of the manuscript of the St Matthew Passion to her grandson came only a few months after his parents conversion, and shortly before her own death.

However when Bella died an examination of her will showed that she had reinstated her son Jacob to his inheritance, and part of her estate was left to him. The remainder was divided between the children of her granddaughters Josephine Benedicks and Marianne Mendelssohn and Lea’s unborn grandchildren. Lea herself, and her husband Abraham, had been cut out entirely, possibly because they had tried to keep their conversion secret from her.

Bella Salomon died in Berlin on 9 March 1824 at the age of 74.
