= Sara Levy (musician) =

German harpsichordist, patron of the arts and music collector

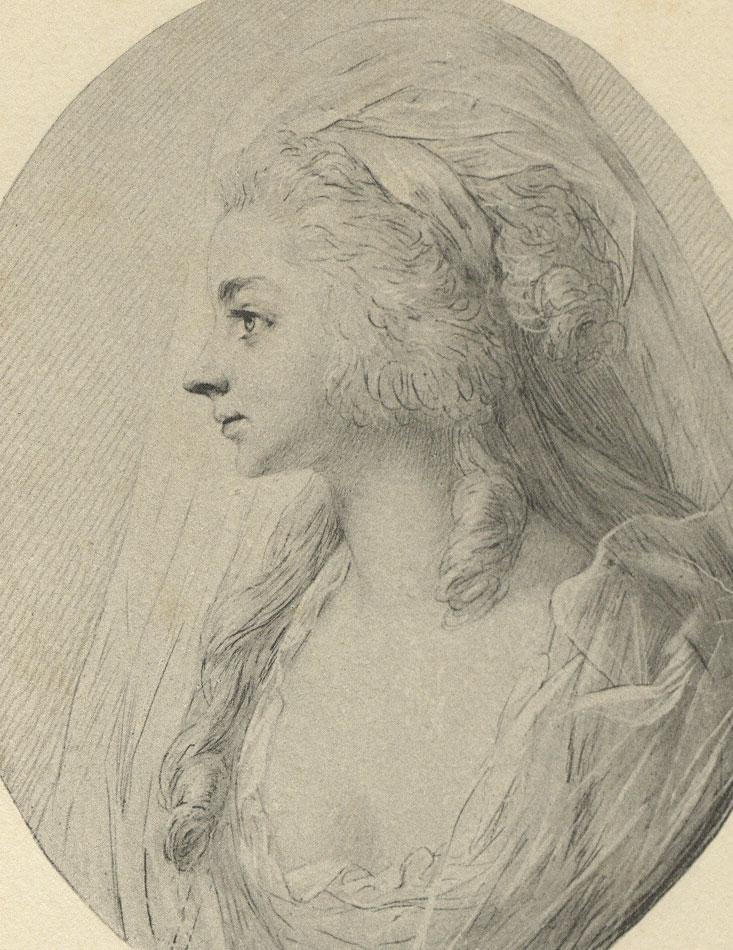
Sara Levy by Levy Anton Graff

Sara Levy (19 June 1761 Berlin – 11 May 1854 Berlin), born Sara Itzig, was a German harpsichordist, patron of the arts and music collector. Her salon was the meeting place of the most important musicians and scholars in Berlin, and she was also known as a philanthropist.

== Life ==
Sara Itzig was the tenth of fifteen children of the wealthy Prussian Court Jew and banker Daniel Itzig and Mariane (Miriam), née Wulff. She was the sister of Fanny von Arnstein, Cäcilie von Eskeles (Zippora Wulff) and Bella Salomon. She was the great-aunt of Fanny Hensel and Felix Mendelssohn Bartholdy.

She was a gifted harpsichordist, favorite student of Wilhelm Friedemann Bach from 1774 to 1784 and after her marriage to the banker Samuel Salomon Levy in 1783, she also became an admirer and patron of Carl Philipp Emanuel Bach. She supported his widow and, together with three of her brothers, subscribed to all of his printed works.

As well as commissioning, collecting and promoting music, she also played the harpsichord for the chorus at the Singakademie which specialised in the study of Bach’s sacred music. Together with the Akademie’s affiliated instrumental ensemble, known as the “Ripien-Schule,“ she performed numerous works for both harpsichord and piano composed by Bach and his sons, as well as other composers, to the Berlin public, although it was most unusual at the time for a woman to do this. Among other pieces she performed the harpsichord part of Brandenburg Concerto No. 5 with the Singakademie in 1808.

Sara Levy is described by her contemporaries, including Louis Pierre Edouard Bignon, Napoleon's ambassador, as a highly educated woman with strong character and an extremely charitable spirit. She supported Berlin orphanages and left them 20,000 thalers after her death. Unlike most of her relatives, who converted to Christianity, she remained in the Jewish faith throughout her life. She was involved in Jewish organisations, subscribed to the publication of Hebrew books and supported Jewish and Hebrew education.

Music and philosophy were her main interests. She had no children, but looked after several of her nephews and nieces, including, in addition to the Mendelssohn children, Julius Eduard Hitzig and de:Benoni Friedländer.

== Musical impact ==
The most important musicians and scholars in Berlin, including Friedrich Schleiermacher, August Adolph von Hennings, Henrich Steffens, Johann Gottlieb Fichte and Bettina von Arnim frequented her salon. Both Haydn and Mozart also came to see her. At her soirees, the music of Johann Sebastian Bach was cultivated, although it was no longer fashionable at the time. She herself sat at the grand piano and, accompanied by an orchestra, played only works by the Bach family.

Abraham Mendelssohn Bartholdy, the husband of her niece Lea, had known Carl Friedrich Zelter since childhood, as he frequented the house of his father Moses Mendelssohn. Sara Levy insisted that Zelter become the teacher of Abraham's older children, Fanny and Felix. She gave Zelter a number of valuable manuscripts of compositions by the Bach family. In her will she also bequeathed her extensive and valuable music library, consisting of manuscripts and first editions, to the Singakademie. In 1854, immediately after her death, these treasures were sold to the Berlin State Library for a knockdown price due to financial difficulties.

Her importance as a collector and transmitter of musical manuscripts was significant. Archival evidence shows that she was an essential link in the transmission of the music of Johann Sebastian Bach, and a catalyst for the "Bach revival" of the early nineteenth century led by her great-nephew Felix Mendelssohn. As well as donating most of her collection to the Singakademie, she gave Felix Mendelssohn a copy of Haydn’s Heiligmesse.

Sarah Levy’s collection of manuscripts and printed music included autograph manuscripts by the Bach sons and works by Carl Heinrich Graun, Johann Gottlieb Graun, Johann Gottlieb Janitsch, Georg Philipp Telemann and Johann Joachim Quantz. The part of her collection that went to the Sing-Akademie zu Berlin was lost until 1999, when it was rediscovered in Kyiv. It has been accessible to scholars at the Staatsbibliothek zu Berlin since 2002, when it was returned from Ukraine. There are 457 works with Sara Levy catalogued as the previous owner.

== Bibliography ==
- Cypess R, Sinkoff N, eds. Sara Levy’s World: Gender, Judaism, and the Bach Tradition in Enlightenment Berlin. Eastman Studies in Music. Boydell & Brewer; 2018:39-51.
