= Crivelli (surname) =

Crivelli is an Italian surname. Notable people with the surname include:

- Aldo Crivelli (1907–1981), Swiss archaeologist
- Alejandra Costamagna Crivelli (born 1970), Chilean writer and journalist
- Alessandro Crivelli (1514–74), Italian Roman Catholic bishop of Cozenza and Cariati and cardinal deacon
- Angiolo Mario Crivelli, also known as Crivellone (1658–1730), Italian painter, mainly of scenes containing animals
- Carlo Crivelli (c. 1435–c. 1495), Venetian Renaissance painter
- Charlotte Crivelli (1863–1956), French Australian philanthropist who founded the French Red Cross Society of Victoria
- Domenico Crivelli (c. 1793–1856), Italian-English tenor and singing teacher
- Enzo Crivelli (born 1995), French professional football striker
- Federico Javier Crivelli (born 1982), Argentine professional footballer
- Gaetano Crivelli (1768–1836), Italian tenor, regarded as one of the founders of that remarkable Bergamo tenor school
- Giacomo Filippo Crivelli (died 1466), Italian Roman Catholic Bishop of Novara
- Giovanni Battista Crivelli (died 1652), Italian composer
- Giovanni Crivelli (painter) (il Crivellino), Italian painter of the 18th-century
- Giovanni Francesco Crivelli (1691–1743), Venetian mathematician and priest
- Giuseppe Gabriel Balsamo-Crivelli (1800–1874), Italian naturalist and academician
- Iseline Crivelli (born 1903, date of death unknown), Italian alpine skier
- Lucrezia Crivelli, model for La Belle Ferronière, a mistress of Ludovico Sforza, Duke of Milan
- Manuel Crivelli (born 1993), Argentine handball player
- Melchiorre Crivelli (1486–1561), Italian Roman Catholic inquisitor and bishop
- Taddeo Crivelli (fl. 1451, died by 1479), painter of illuminated manuscripts of the Ferrara school (also known as Taddeo da Ferrara)
- Uberto Crivelli (died 1187), birth name of Pope Urban III
- Victoria Crivelli (born 1990), Argentine handball player
- Vittorio Crivelli (c. 1440–c. 1501), Italian painter, brother of Carlo Crivelli

== See also ==
- Crivello, surname
