= Giovanni Crivelli =

Giovanni Crivelli may refer to:

- Giovanni Crivelli (painter) (il Crivellino), 18th-century painter
- Giovanni Francesco Crivelli (1691–1743), Venetian mathematician and priest
- Giovanni Battista Crivelli (died 1652), Italian composer
