= Palais Arnstein =

Palace in Vienna, Austria

Coordinates: 48°12′38″N 16°22′23″E

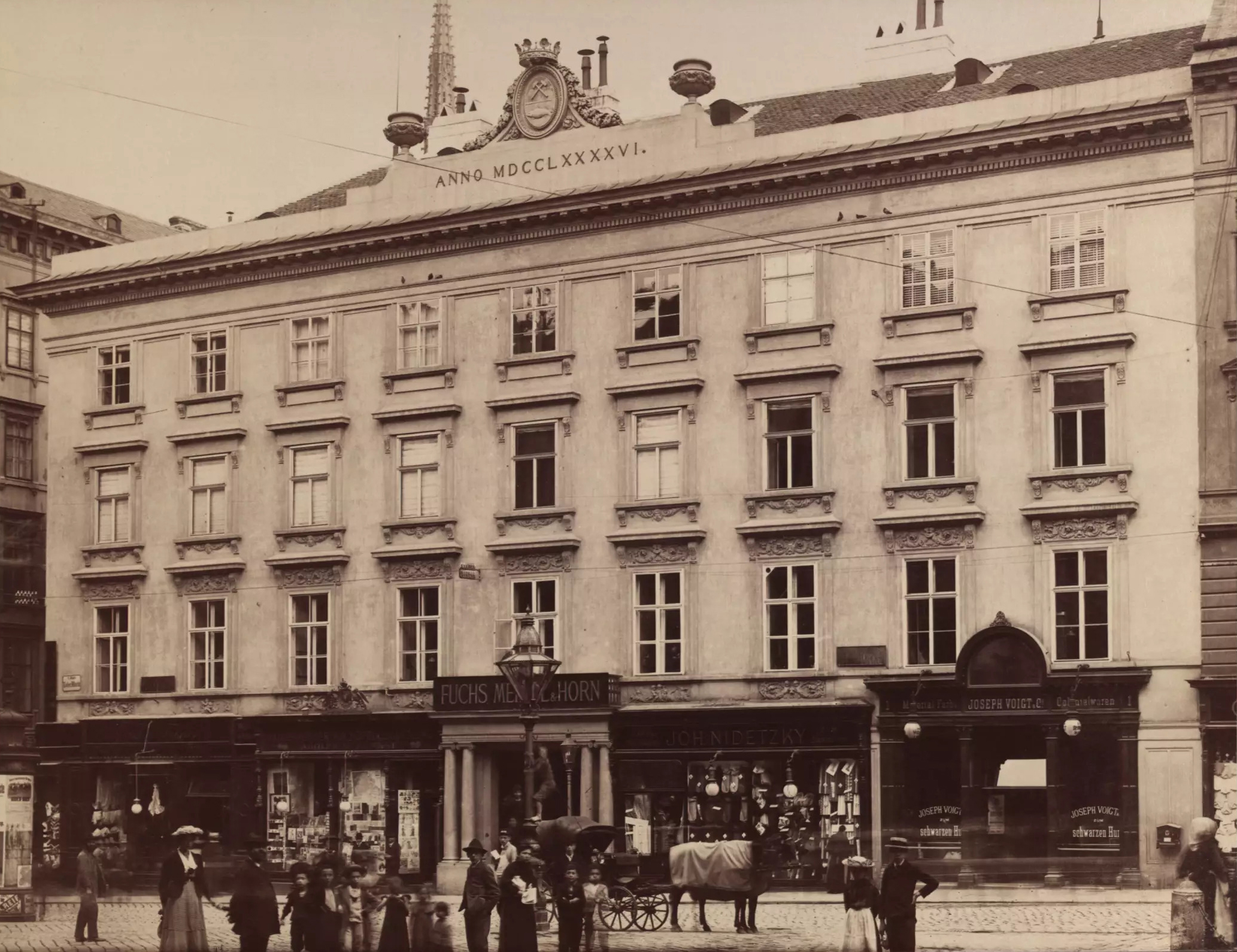
The building in 1903

Palais Arnstein was a palace in Vienna, Austria. The building was constructed from 1794 to 1796 by the merchant Franz Natorp. The Jewish noble Nathan Adam von Arnstein rented the palace, since Jews were not allowed to own property in the city.

The palace was hit by bombs during World War II and burned. Nevertheless, the building remained standing. At first, there were plans for renovation, however the palace was demolished in 1952 for real estate speculation, and a modern building was erected in its place instead.

== The Salon of Baroness Fanny von Arnstein ==
Fanny von Arnstein, married to the banker Nathan, established a salon in the Arnstein mansion, which quickly became a focus of Vienna's intellectual and cultural life. This had some effect in removing the barriers between the aristocracy, the bourgeoisie, and the Jewish citizens of Vienna. Her sister Cäcilie von Eskeles also had her own salon in Vienna.

The palace saw many balls, concerts and literature readings. This made Baroness Arnstein very well known and highly esteemed: even Emperor Josef II called her his friend and would pay visits. During the Vienna Congress, the salon was a meeting-point for diplomats for informal talks, even hosting the likes of state chancellor Prince Metternich.

After the death of Fanny von Arnstein, her daughter Henriette von Pereira-Arnstein continued her mother's tradition as salonière.

== Sources ==
- Michaela Feurstein], Gerhard Milchram. Jüdisches Wien. Boehlau Verlag, Vienna. 2001. ISBN 3-205-99094-3
