= Wednesday Society =

Wednesday Society may refer to:

- Wednesday Society or Club of Thirteen, a radical intellectual club in London, founded in the 1770s by David Williams
- Mittwochsgesellschaft (disambiguation), a number of German intellectual societies named "Wednesday Society"
- Issuikai or Uyoku dantai, a right-wing Japanese nationalist society founded in 1972
