= Crivella =

Crivella is a surname. Notable people with the surname include:

- Jonas Crivella (born 1988), Brazilian water polo player
- Marcelo Crivella (born 1957), Brazilian Evangelical pastor, gospel singer, and politician

== See also ==
- Civella
- Crivelli (surname)
- Crivello
