= Fanny von Arnstein =

Viennese socialite and salonnière

Baroness Fanny von Arnstein
- Born: Vögele Itzig; 29 September 1758; Berlin, Germany
- Died: 8 June 1818 (aged 59) near Vienna
- Occupations: Socialite; salonnière
- Spouse: Baron Nathan Adam von Arnstein
- Children: Henriette von Pereira-Arnstein
- Parent: Daniel Itzig

Baroness Franziska von Arnstein (née Vögele Itzig; 29 September 1758 – 8 June 1818) was an Austrian socialite and salonnière who was a supporter of both Wolfgang Amadeus Mozart and Ludwig van Beethoven.

== Biography ==
Fanny Arnstein was born in Berlin, the daughter of Daniel Itzig, a banker. She was a member of the extensive and influential Jewish Itzig family.

She married the banker Nathan Adam von Arnstein, a partner in the firm of Arnstein and Eskeles; her sister Cäcilie von Eskeles was married to the other partner, Bernhard von Eskeles. They brought the social influences of Berlin, notably the concept of the intellectual salon, to the Vienna of Joseph II. The Arnstein mansion at Vienna and her villas at Schönbrunn and Baden bei Wien were regularly used for hospitality. She was also involved in charitable works. Mozart would frequently be a guest performer during the early days of the salon and the Arnstein's would also attend Mozart's subscription concerts.

Her salon was known for attracting individuals of intellect and brilliance. During the Vienna Congress the Arnstein salon was frequented by celebrities including Beethoven, Wellington, Metternich, Talleyrand, Hardenberg, Rahel Varnhagen and her husband, the Schlegels, Justinus Kerner, Karoline Pichler, and Zacharias Werner. She was one of the founders of the Gesellschaft der Musikfreunde and was herself a skilled musician, particularly on the pianoforte.

In 1814, Fanny von Arnstein introduced a new custom from Berlin, hitherto unknown in Vienna: the Christmas tree.

Her only daughter, Henrietta, Baroness Pereira-Arnstein, was also a skilled musician and a regular correspondent of her cousin, Lea Salomon, wife of Abraham Mendelssohn and mother of Felix and Fanny Mendelssohn (who was named after Fanny Arnstein).

== See also ==
- Benedikt Arnstein
- Bernhard von Eskeles
- Itzig family
- Palais Arnstein
- Salon of Berta Zuckerkandl
