= Franz Graf von Wimpffen =

Austrian general and admiral

Generalfeldmarschall Franz Graf von Wimpffen
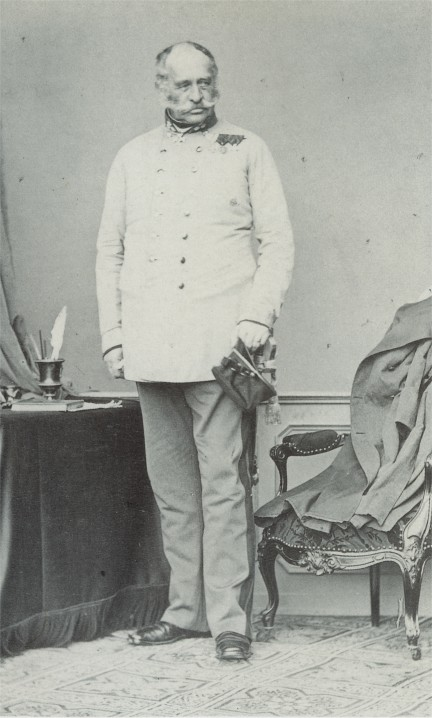
- Wimpffen photographed by Ludwig Angerer (1860)

Statthalter of the Austrian Littoral
- In office 1850–1854
- Appointed by: Franz Joseph I
- Preceded by: Johann von Grimschitz
- Succeeded by: Eduard von Bach

Rector of Milan
- In office 3 August 1848 – 6 January 1849
- Appointed by: Franz Joseph I
- Preceded by: Gabrio Casati
- Succeeded by: Antonio Pestalozza

Personal details
- Born: 2 April 1797 Prague, Kingdom of Bohemia, Holy Roman Empire
- Died: 26 November 1870 (aged 73) Gorizia, Austrian Littoral, Austria-Hungary
- Spouse: Marianne von Eskeles (m. 1825; died 1862)
- Children: Heinrich; Franz; Viktor Agidius; Maria
- Profession: Military officer

Military service
- Allegiance: Austrian Empire; Austria-Hungary
- Branch/service: Austro-Hungarian Army; Austro-Hungarian Navy
- Years of service: 1813–1870
- Rank: Second lieutenant Major general Field marshal Admiral (navy)
- Unit: Trieste Brigade; 1st Austrian Army
- Battles/wars: Napoleonic Wars First Italian War of Independence Second Italian War of Independence

Franz Emil Lorenz Heeremann Graf von Wimpffen (2 April 1797 – 26 November 1870) was an Austrian General and Admiral who served as Administrative Head of the Austro-Hungarian Navy from 1851 to 1854.

== Military career ==
Franz von Wimpffen was born in Prague on 2 April 1797, the son of Karl Franz Eduard von Wimpffen (1776–1842), who served as Chief of the Austro-Hungarian General Staff (from 1824 to 1830), and his wife, Princess Victoria von Anhalt-Bernburg-Schaumburg-Hoym (1772-1817), widow of Landgrave Karl of Hesse-Philippsthal (1757-1793). He was the owner of Kainberg, Reitenau, and Eichberg castles and estates in Austria and, as a Roman Catholic, was a Knight of the Sovereign Military Order of Malta.

He was commissioned Unterleutnant in October 1813 and served as an artillery officer during the last three years of the Napoleonic Wars, in the German campaign of 1813, the French campaign of 1814, and the Neapolitan War in 1815.

Promoted Generalmajor in 1838, he was given command of a brigade in Trieste. Wimpffen was made commander of a division of II Army Corps in Italy in 1846 with the rank of Feldmarschall-leutnant (Lieutenant-Field-Marshal in the Imperial and Royal Austrian Army). He distinguished himself in the 1848 campaign at Vicenza and Custoza. Later, in the Papal States he compelled by bombardment the surrender of Bologna and Ancona.

In October 1849 Wimpffen was named Civil and Military Governor of Trieste and Governor of the Küstenland (Coastal Lands), the region that included the Istrian Peninsula, with the rank of Feldzeugmeister (General of the Artillery in the Austrian Army).

Upon the resignation of Hans Birch Dahlerup in August 1851, Wimpffen was named his successor as Oberkommandant der Marine ('High Commander of the Navy' or Provisional Commander-in-Chief of the Imperial and Royal Navy). During his tenure, the development of the naval base of Pola was accelerated and a new Imperial and Royal Naval Cadet School at Fiume (now Rijeka, Croatia) was planned to be built there.

In September 1854, Wimpffen was dismissed as Oberkommandant der Marine by Emperor Franz Josef against the advice of his military advisers. Wimpffen instead took command of I Army Corps. He was succeeded as Head of the Navy by Archduke Ferdinand Maximilian of Austria, the younger brother of Franz Josef.

However well he had performed as Administrative Head of the Navy, Wimpffen was known in military circles as "the General who had never won a battle". In the Second Italian War of Independence in 1859, after the defeat at Magenta on 4 June, he seconded the decision of Gyulai, the Austrian commander, to retreat across the Mincio to Mantua, leaving Milan and all of Lombardy to the Sardinians and French. Gyulai was dismissed on 16 June by Franz Josef, who assumed command of the field army with Wimpffen in command of the Cavalry.

At Solferino (24 June 1859), Wimpffen and his men fought valiantly, but the Austrians were defeated. The carnage of the battle was so severe that it was soon followed by an armistice and then peace negotiations.

In 1861, Wimpffen was retired with the rank of Generalfeldzeugmeister (Field Marshal of the ordnance /Field Marshal of artillery in the Austrian Army) and became an Imperial and Royal Advisor to the Emperor of Austria.

He died on 26 November 1870 at Görz (now Gorizia), and was buried at the crypt of the Eichberg castle chapel, in Austria, together with his wife.

== Marriage and children ==
On 5 October 1825, he married Baroness Maria Anna Marianne Cecilia Bernhardine von Eskeles (1802-1862), who converted from Judaism to Catholicism, in Hietzing, Austria. She was born at the Palais Eskeles, Vienna, Austria, on 2 March 1802, daughter of Bernhard von Eskeles and wife Caecilie (Zipperche) Itzig, from whom she inherited a fortune in stocks and bonds, and died in Munich, Bavaria, on 10 August 1862.
They had :

- Heinrich Emil Graf von Wimpffen (1827-1896), succeeded him as head of the comital house.
- Franz Alphons von Wimpffen (1828-1866), Colonel, killed at the Battle of Náchod.
- Viktor Agidius Christian Gustav Maximillian Graf von Wimpffen (Hietzing, Vienna, Austria, 24 July 1834 – Battaglia Terme, Italy, 22 May 1887), was some time Corvette Captain of the Austro-Hungarian Navy, and Inspector-General of Telegraphs in Austria and married in Vevey, Switzerland, on 11 January 1860 Anasztázia (Anastasia) Barónin Sina de Hódos et Kizdia (Vienna, 8 October 1838 – Vienna, 24 February 1889), of Hungarian, Romanian (Ghica family) and Georgian (Dadiani) descent, by whom he had issue.
- Maria von Wimpffen (1842-1918), married Friedrich Balduin von Gagern, had issue.

== See also ==
- Austro-Hungarian Navy
- Franz Graf von Wimpffen
- VI generation of Dressel

== Terminology note ==
- Regarding personal names, Graf is a German title, translated as Count, not a first or middle name. The feminine form is Grafin.
