= Jakob Bartholdy =

Jakob Bartholdy may refer to:

- Jakob Salomon Bartholdy (1779–1825), Prussian diplomat
- Jakob Ludwig Felix Mendelssohn Bartholdy (1809–1847), German composer better known as Felix Mendelssohn, nephew of the above
