= Sarah Levy =

Sarah or Sara Levy may refer to:

- Sarah Levy (actress), Canadian actress
- Sarah Levy (rugby union), South African-born American rugby union player
- Sarah Rose Levy, legal analyst/law clerk on Judy Justice
- Sara Levy (synchronized swimmer), Spanish sychronized swimmer
- Sara Levy (musician) (1761–1854), German harpsichordist
