= Bernhard von Eskeles =

Austrian-Jewish banker/financier and court Jew

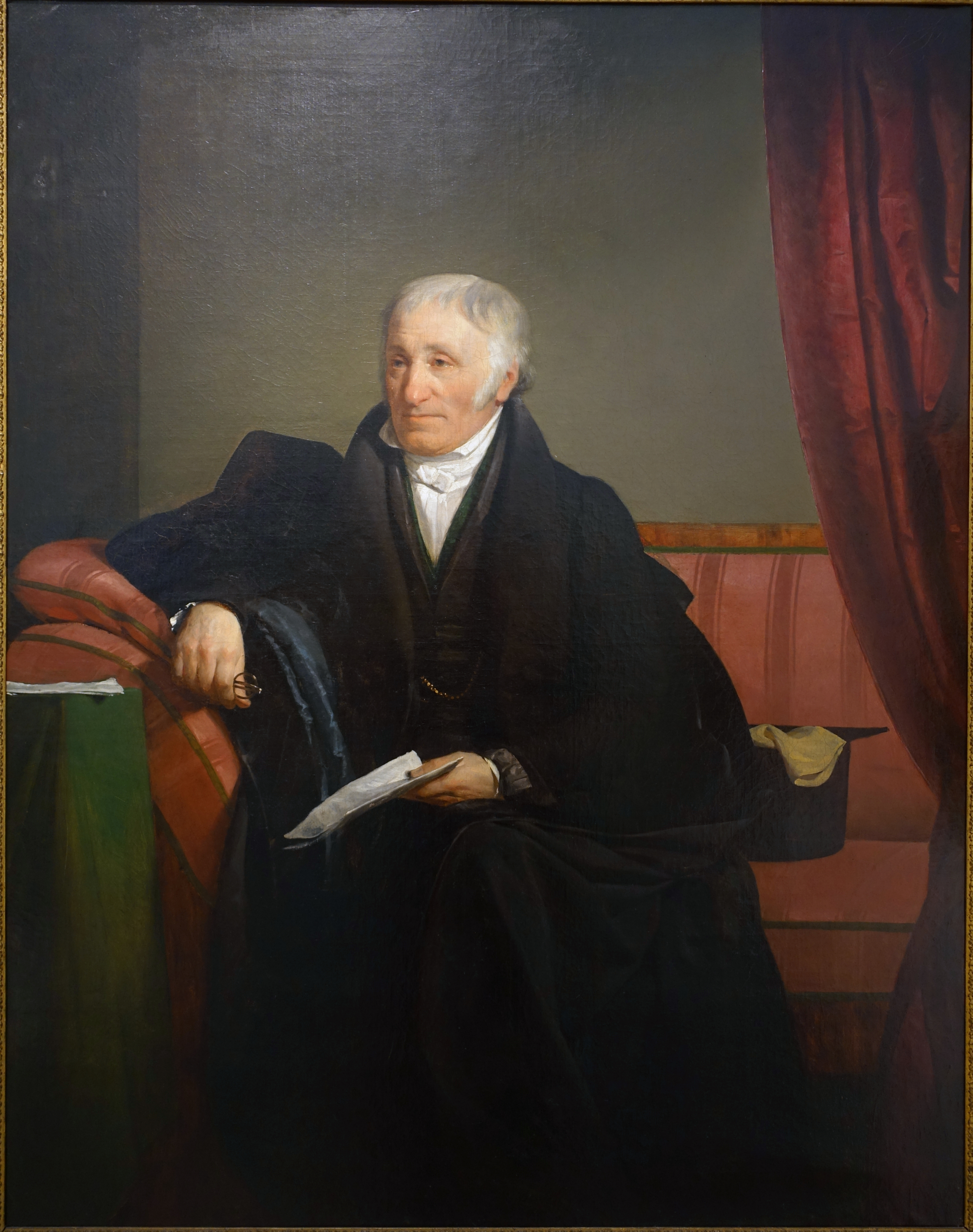
Bernhard Eskeles

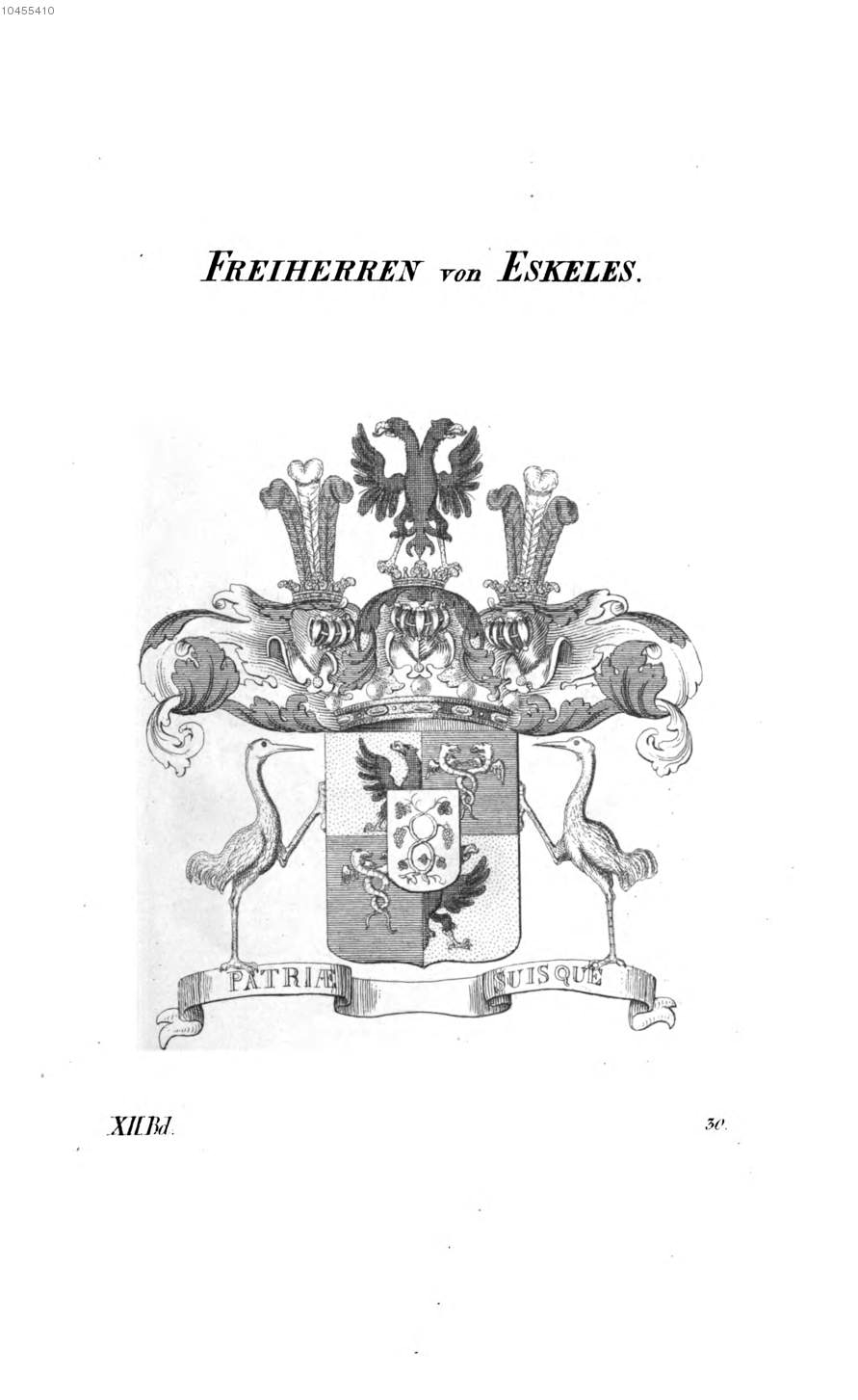
Arms of the Baron von Eskeles

Bernhard, Knight and Baron von Eskeles (German: Bernhard Ritter und Freiherr von Eskeles; 12 February 1753 – 7 August 1839) was an Austrian Jewish banker, financier and court Jew.

== Early life ==
He was born Bernhard Eskeles on 12 February 1753 in Vienna, the posthumous son of rabbi Issachar Berush Eskeles, son of the Polish-Moravian rabbi Gabriel Eskeles. At an early age he went to Amsterdam, where he entered a commercial house, of which he became manager at the age of 17, but met with reverses, and lost the fortune which his father had left to him.

== Biography ==
In 1774 he returned to Vienna and entered the business of his brother-in-law Nathan Arnstein, with whom he established the banking-house of Arnstein and Eskeles, which came into great prominence during the Congress of Vienna. They were patrons of Mozart, Beethoven and Ignaz Moscheles who gave piano lessons to Caecilie. At this period Eskeles's drawing-room was the rendezvous of men like Beethoven, Talleyrand, Wellington, Castlereagh, Hardenberg, and Theodor Körner. Eskeles's name is often mentioned in the memoirs of this time.

His advice in financial matters was frequently sought by Emperors Joseph II, and later by Francis II and I, who entrusted him with many important missions to foreign countries. He was sent to Paris and Holland in 1810. Eskeles was the founder of the Austrian National Bank (1816), and its director for 23 years.

He was raised to the Austrian nobility in 1797, and became a knight in 1811, and a baron in 1822.

Eskeles took little interest in Jewish affairs, and during his short term of office as representative of the Jewish community new and vexatious measures were introduced which, according to his contemporaries, he might have prevented had he used his influence. He was, however, the founder of several charitable institutions. He also established, with an initial contribution of 50,000 florins, a fund for the maintenance of poor students.

He died on 7 August 1839 in Hietzing (now part of Vienna).

== Personal life ==
He was married to Caecilie (Zipperche) Itzig (1760–1836), daughter of Daniel Itzig of Berlin. They had two children, a son, Denis, Baron de Eskeles (1803–1876), and a daughter, Maria Anna (Marianne) Cecilia Bernhardine Freiin von Eskeles, Countess of Wimpffen, wife of Franz Graf von Wimpffen, deserted Judaism. Denis, who succeeded his father in the management of the banking-house, married Wilhelmina, Baroness Brentano-Cimaroli, and by his death the male line of the house became extinct.

== See also ==
- Itzig family
