= The Seventeenth Century =

The Seventeenth Century may refer to:

- 17th century
- The Seventeenth Century (journal), a history journal
- The Seventeenth Century (album), an album by Felt
