= Itzig family =

Many of the thirteen children of Daniel Itzig and Miriam Wulff, and their descendants and spouses, had significant impact on both Jewish and German social and cultural (especially musical) history. Notable ones are set out below.

== Bella Itzig (1749–1824) ==
Married Levin Jacob Salomon. Their son Jakob Salomon (1774–1825) converted to Christianity and took the surname Bartholdy, and was for a time Prussian consul in Italy. Their daughter Lea (1777–1842) married Abraham Mendelssohn (1776-1835; the son of Moses Mendelssohn). Lea and Abraham's children were Felix Mendelssohn and Fanny Mendelssohn (Jakob persuaded Abraham Mendelssohn to adopt the Bartholdy surname). It was Bella who, "unaware of Felix's baptism", gave a manuscript of Bach's St. Matthew Passion to her grandson Felix Mendelssohn in 1824.

== Isaac Daniel Itzig (1750–1806) ==
Founded with his brother-in-law David Friedländer the Jewish Free School in Berlin in 1778, the first of its kind.

== Susanna Itzig (1752–1814) ==
Married David Friedländer, joint founder of the Jewish Free School in Berlin, who employed Moses Mendelssohn in his silk factory, and founded the bank of 'Mendelssohn and Friedländer' with Moses's son, Joseph. Friedländer was a major force in the movement for Jewish religious reform.

== Elias Itzig (b. 1755) ==
Elias was the father of the lawyer Julius Eduard Hitzig, butt of many gibes by Heinrich Heine, and of Henriette Itzig who married Nathan (Carl Theodore) Mendelssohn, son of Moses Mendelssohn.

== Bonem Itzig (b. 1756) ==
Father of Friedrich Hitzig, architect of many 19th-century Berlin buildings, including the Stock Exchange built on the site of the Mendelssohn house.

== Fanny (Feigele) Itzig (1758–1818) ==
Married the Viennese banker Baron Nathan Adam von Arnstein. They were both patrons and acquaintances of both Mozart and Beethoven in Vienna. Their daughter, Baroness Henriette von Pereira-Arnstein, was a constant correspondent of her cousin, Felix Mendelssohn's mother Lea.

== Caecilie (Zipperche) Itzig (1760–1836) ==
Married the Viennese banker Freiherr Bernhard von Eskeles, who joined his brother-in-law Arnstein (see above) in partnership. They were patrons of Mozart and also of Ignaz Moscheles who gave piano lessons to Caecilie.

== Sara(h) Itzig (1761–1854) ==
Married Solomon Levy. A talented keyboard player, she was the favourite pupil of Wilhelm Friedemann Bach and supported the widow of Carl Philipp Emanuel Bach. She performed the harpsichord part at the premiere of the Concerto for Fortepiano and Harpsichord by Carl Philipp Emanuel Bach, and probably commissioned the piece. She took a strong interest in the musical education of her grandnephew Felix Mendelssohn, recommending Zelter as his teacher. Her unique collection of Bach manuscripts was left to the Sing-Akademie zu Berlin, where she often performed in concerts.

== Julius Eduard Hitzig (1780-1849) ==
Born Isaac Elias Itzig, he was a German author and civil servant.

== See also ==
- Mendelssohn family
- List of German Jews
