= Felice Boselli =

Italian painter (1650–1732)

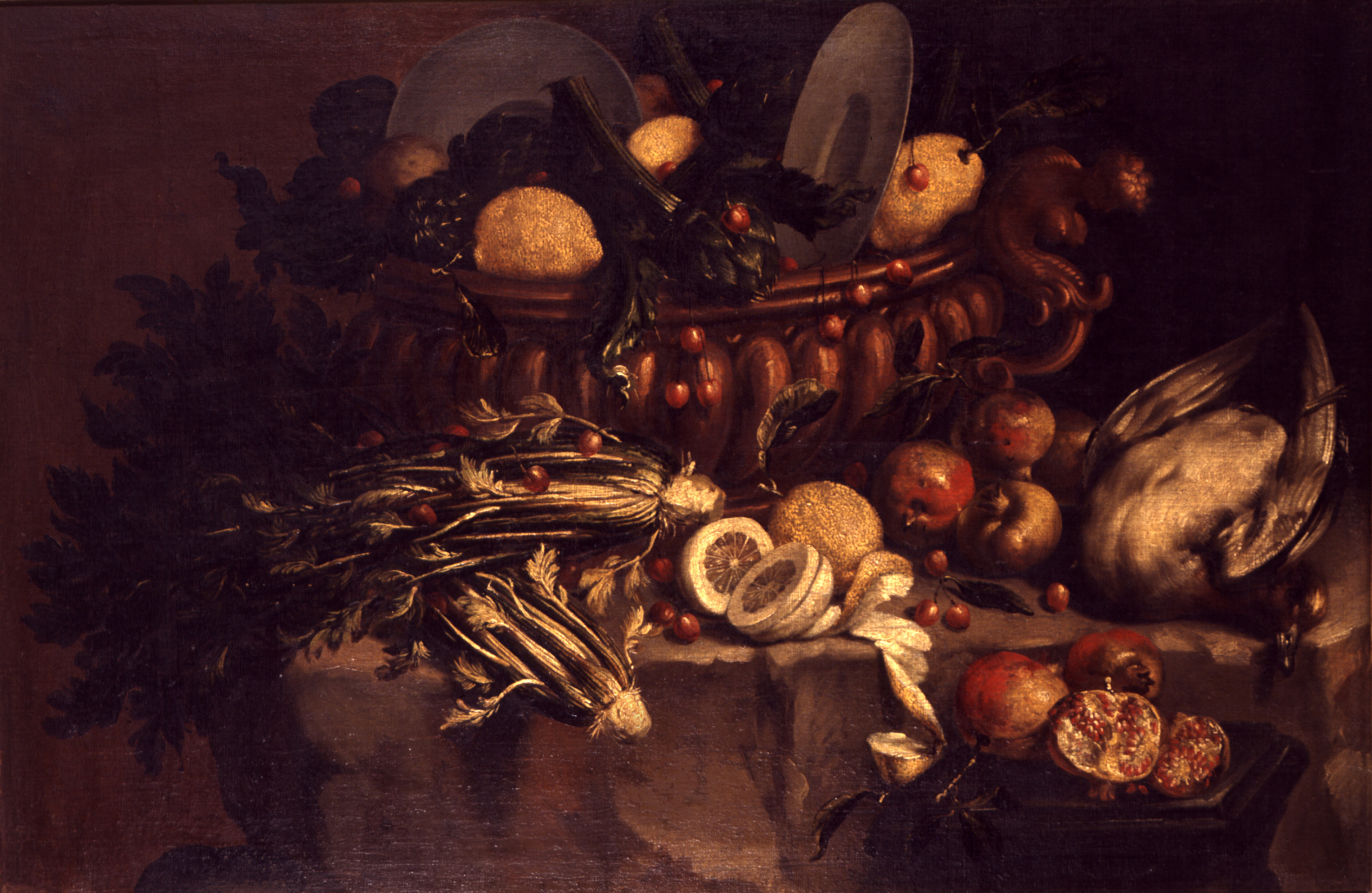
Still life with vegetables and venison

Felice Boselli (Piacenza, 20 April 1650 – Parma, 23 August 1732) was an Italian painter of the Baroque period, active mainly in Piacenza. He was not the pupil of Giuseppe Nuvolone, the son of Panfilo, as some have stated, but instead of Giuseppe's brother, Michelangelo Nuvolone. In that studio, he met the still-life painter Angelo Maria Crivelli also called il Crivellone, who became influential in his style. He is known for still-life paintings of live and dead game, including animals, birds, and fish.
