= Jerome Roche =

British musicologist

Jerome Lawrence Alexander Roche (22 May 1942 – 2 June 1994) was a British musicologist, who specialized in the Italian church music of the baroque era. Among his publications are North Italian Church Music in the Age of Monteverdi (1984), as well as surveys on the life and works of both Giovanni Pierluigi da Palestrina and Orlando di Lasso.

== Early life and education ==
Roche was born in 1942 in Cairo, Egypt, the son of an army doctor. He was educated at Downside School, a Catholic independent school in Somerset, England, before studying music at St John's College, Cambridge, graduating with a BA in 1962. He went on to study for a PhD, under the supervision of Denis Arnold. His dissertation focussed on the development of vocal duets in Italian baroque church music.

== Career ==
In 1967, the year before completing his PhD, Roche was appointed a lecturer at Durham University. He became a reader in 1987.

Roche published editions of music by Francesco Cavalli, Giovanni Battista Crivelli and Alessandro Grandi, and rediscovered many works from the period that had become forgotten. He edited The Penguin Book of Four-Part Italian Madrigals (1974) and Masterworks from Venice (1994).

Roche was a member of the editorial board of the journal The Seventeenth Century from its establishment in 1986. He also regularly contributed articles and book reviews to other journals such as The Musical Times, Music & Letters and Early Music, as well as scholarly publications by the Royal Musical Association.

== Personal life and death ==
Roche was married to Elizabeth, a fellow musicologist and graduate of Durham University. His interests outside of music included railways and meteorology. He was also a committed Catholic.

Roche died aged 52 at his holiday home in Vittorio Veneto, Italy in June 1994 from a brain tumour. The tumour had been discovered earlier in the year, during a period of hospitalisation following a suspected stroke. He was survived by his wife and one daughter, the latter now also a lecturer at Durham.

A concert was held in his honour in Durham Cathedral in October 1994.

In 2001, the Royal Musical Association created the Jerome Roche Prize, which is awarded annually to a young scholar for a published article on musicology in English.

== Selected publications ==
- Palestrina (Oxford: Oxford University Press, 1971) - Oxford Studies of Composers series
- The Madrigal (New York : C. Scribner's Son, 1972)
- A Dictionary of Early Music: From the Troubadours to Monteverdi (Oxford: Oxford University Press, 1981) - edited with Elizabeth Roche
- Lassus (Oxford: Oxford University Press, 1982) - Oxford Studies of Composers series
- North Italian Church Music in the Age of Monteverdi (Oxford: Clarendon Press, 1984)
