= Benedikt Arnstein =

Austrian author (1765–1841)

- Born: Benedikt David Arnstein; 15 October 1765; Vienna, Archduchy of Austria, Holy Roman Empire
- Died: 6 January 1841 (aged 75); Vienna, Austrian Empire
- Writing career
- Pen name: Arenhof
- Language: German

Benedikt David Arnstein (15 October 1765 – 6 January 1841), also known by the pen name Arenhof, was an Austrian playwright. He is considered the first German-language Jewish dramatist and poet.

== Biography ==
Benedikt Arnstein was born in Vienna into a prominent Jewish banking family, the son of wholesaler David Isaak Arnstein. His grandfather was the prominent banker Adam Isaac von Arnstein (son of Isaak Arnstein), and his aunt the socialite Fanny von Arnstein.

He began working at his grandfather's banking house in 1782, but left in 1786 to undertake a series of travels across Germany, France, Spain and Italy. This enabled him to become personally acquainted with many distinguished writers of his time, including Johann Baptist von Alxinger and Ignaz Liebel, who introduced him to classical Greek and Roman literature. His literary circle included Joseph Friedrich Freiherr von Retzer, Joseph Schreyvogel, August von Kotzebue, Joseph Franz Ratschky, and Gottlieb Leon.

Apart from individual poems, which appeared in monographs and almanacs, Arnstein published numerous dramatic works, some of which were performed at the Burgtheater in Vienna. His 1782 work Einige jüdische Familienscenen celebrated the Edict of Tolerance of Emperor Joseph II.

== Publications ==
- Einige jüdische Familienscenen, bey Erblickung des Patents über die Freyheiten, welche die Juden in den kaiserlichen Staaten erhalten haben [Some Jewish Family Scenes]. Vienna: Rudolph Graffer. 1782.
- Die Maske. Ein Lustspiel in einem Aufzug [The Mask] (comedy). Vienna: Johann Joseph Jahn. 1788.
- Katharine Jaquet im Reiche der Todten. Einige Gelegenheits-Szenen [Katharine Jaquet in the Realm of the Dead]. Vienna: s.n. 1789.
- Arnstein, Benedikt David (1785). Die Nachschrift. Ein Original-Lustspiel in einem Aufzuge [The Postscript]. Vienna.
- Dramatische Versuche [Dramatic Attempts]. Vienna: Edl. von Baumeisterischen Buchdrukerei. 1787.
- Die Pflegetochter. Ein Schauspiel in drey Aufzügen [The Foster Daughter] (drama). Vienna: F. J. Kaiserer. 1790.
- Die Kleinodien. Ein Schauspiel [The Jewels] (drama). Vienna. 1796.
- Das Billett. Ein Lustspiel in einem Aufzug [The Ticket] (comedy). Vienna: Johann Baptist Wallishausser. 1800.
- Das Geschenk. Ein Gelegenheitsstück in einem Aufzuge [The Gift]. Vienna: Johann Baptist Wallishausser. 1801.
