= Civella =

Civella is a surname. Notable people with the surname include:

- Anthony Civella (1930–2006), American criminal
- Carl Civella (1910–1994), American criminal, father of Anthony and brother of Nicholas
- Nicholas Civella (1912–1983), American criminal

== See also ==
- Crivella
