= Charlotte Caroline Wilhelmine Bachmann =

German singer, harpsichordist and composer

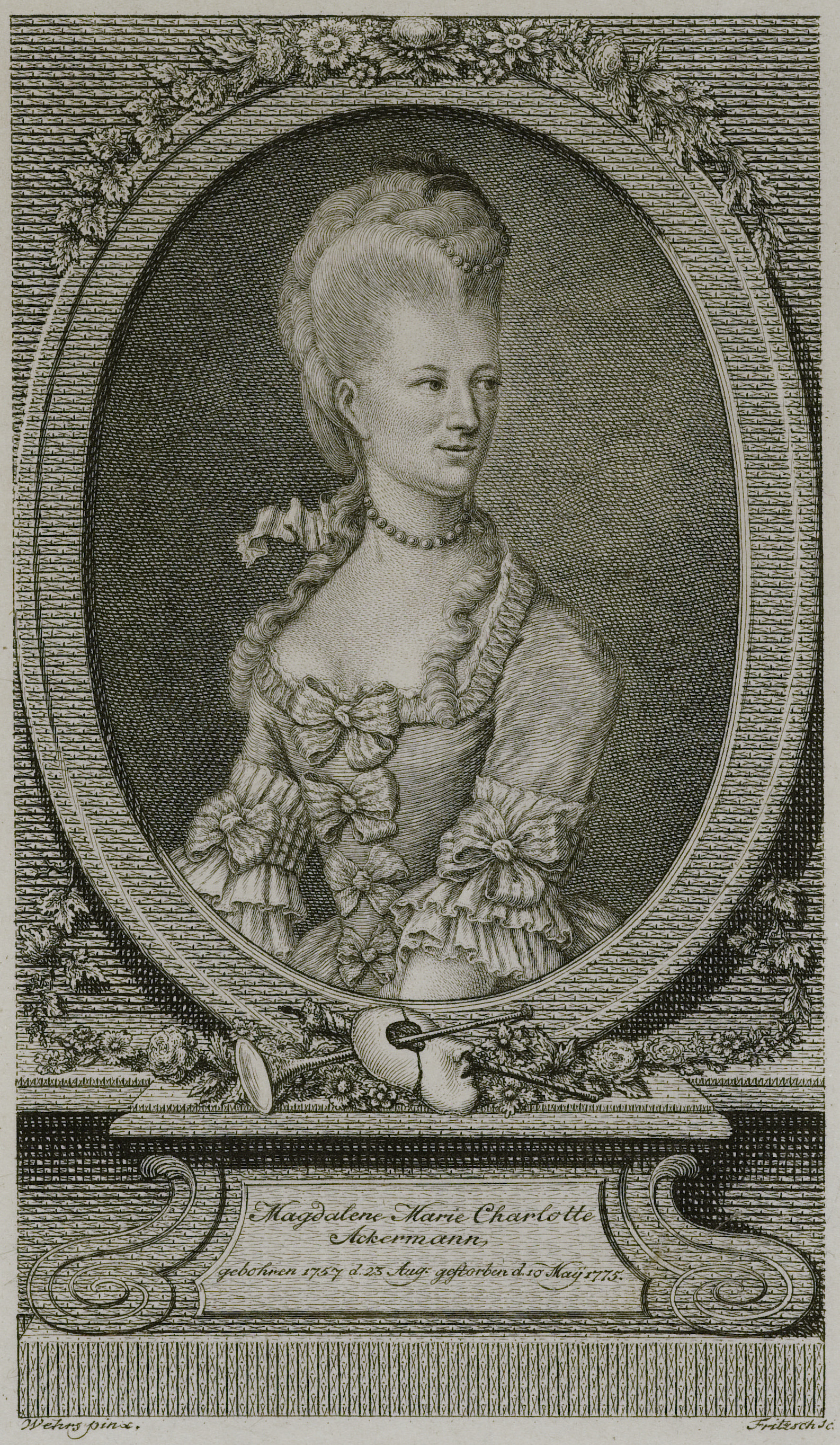
Charlotte Caroline Wilhelmine Bachmann

Charlotte Caroline Wilhelmine Bachmann, née Stöwe (2 November 1757 – 19 August 1817) was a German soprano, harpsichordist and composer. She was born in Berlin, the daughter of musician Wilhelm Heinrich Stöwe, and studied singing and harpsichord as a child. At the age of nine, she made her debut in the Liebhaberkonzerte (Amateur Concerts) which had been established by Friedrich Benda, son of Franz Benda. She married Berlin violist Karl Ludwig Bachmann on 20 September 1785.

She was one of twenty founding members of the Berlin Singakademie in 1791, and was instrumental in establishing annual performances of C. H. Graun’s Der Tod Jesu between 1797 and 1806, a tradition that continued at the Berlin court until 1884. She was well regarded as a performer in Berlin. One of her songs was published in Rellstab's Clavier-Magazin in 1787. She died in Berlin.

== Works ==
Bachman composed songs. Selected works include:

- "Mädchen wenn dein Lächeln winket", 1787
