= Joseph ben Mordechai Gershon =

Polish rabbi (1510–1591)

Joseph ben Mordechai Gershon HaKohen Ka"tz (1510 in Kraków – 1591) was a kohen, a rabbi and Talmudist, who began his studies in the Talmud at an early age, and became the dean (rosh yeshivah) at a yeshiva founded for him by his father-in-law. His views on religious questions were widely sought, while Solomon Luria was one of his correspondents.

Joseph was the author of "She'erit Yosef" (Kraków, 1590), containing responsa and discussions on various rabbinical subjects, as well as a commentary on the "Mordechai" tractates Nezikin, Berakot, and Mo'ed. In the preface the author states that he published this work at the request of his sons, Tanhuma and Aaron Moses, who were members of the Jewish community of Kraków. He also corrected the manuscript from which was printed the "Aggudah" of Alexandri HaKohain of Frankfurt.

Joseph is an ancestor of Miriam Wulff, wife of Daniel Itzig (1723-1799), Court Jew of Frederick the Great.

== Jewish Encyclopedia bibliography ==
- She'rith Yosef
- I. M. Zunz, 'Ir ha-zedek, p. 23, Lemberg, 1874;
- Rabinowitz, Ha'arot we-Tikunim, p. 6, Lyck, 1875;
- Dembitzer, Kelilat Yoft, p. 4b, Kraków, 1888;
- B. Friedberg, Gesch. der Hebräischen Typographie in Krakau, p. 8, ib. 1900.S.
