= Cäcilie von Eskeles =

German Jewish noblewoman

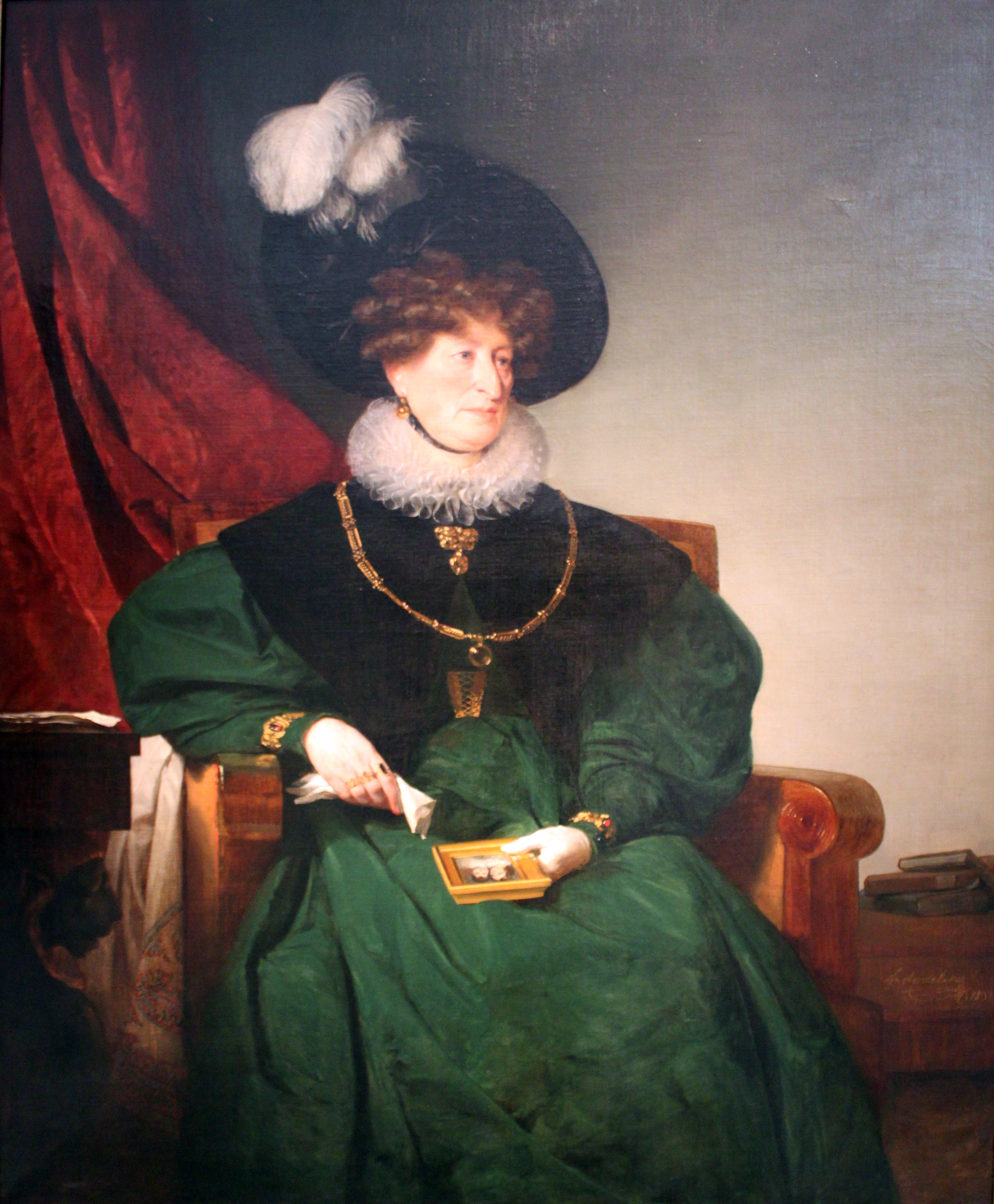
Portrait of Cecilie von Eskeles (1832)

Cäcilie von Eskeles (1760 Berlin - 25 April 1836 Vienna) was a German Jewish noblewoman, salonnière, music collector and harpsichordist in early 19th century Vienna. She was a friend of Goethe and of Beethoven.

== Family life ==
Cäcilie was the ninth of fifteen children of the Prussian Court Jew and banker Daniel Itzig and his wife Mariane (Miriam), née Wulff. She was also known in her family as Zippora, Zipporah, Zipora, Zipper and Zipperche. She was the sister of Fanny von Arnstein, Bella Salomon and Sara Levy. In 1777 she married her cousin Benjamin Isaac Wulff, from whom she later separated, possibly because of his conversion to Christianity. The couple had no children.

== Vienna salon ==
In 1800 she married again, to Bernhard von Eskeles, a Viennese banker and business partner of Nathan Adam von Arnstein, who was married to her sister Fanny. On her arrival in Vienna, Cäcilie was described by Karoline Jagemann as a woman who “outwardly bore the stamp of the women of the Old Testament” who had “not quite overcome the peculiar dialect of her nation” but who “knew how to make up for what was striking in her features by elegance in form and deportment.”

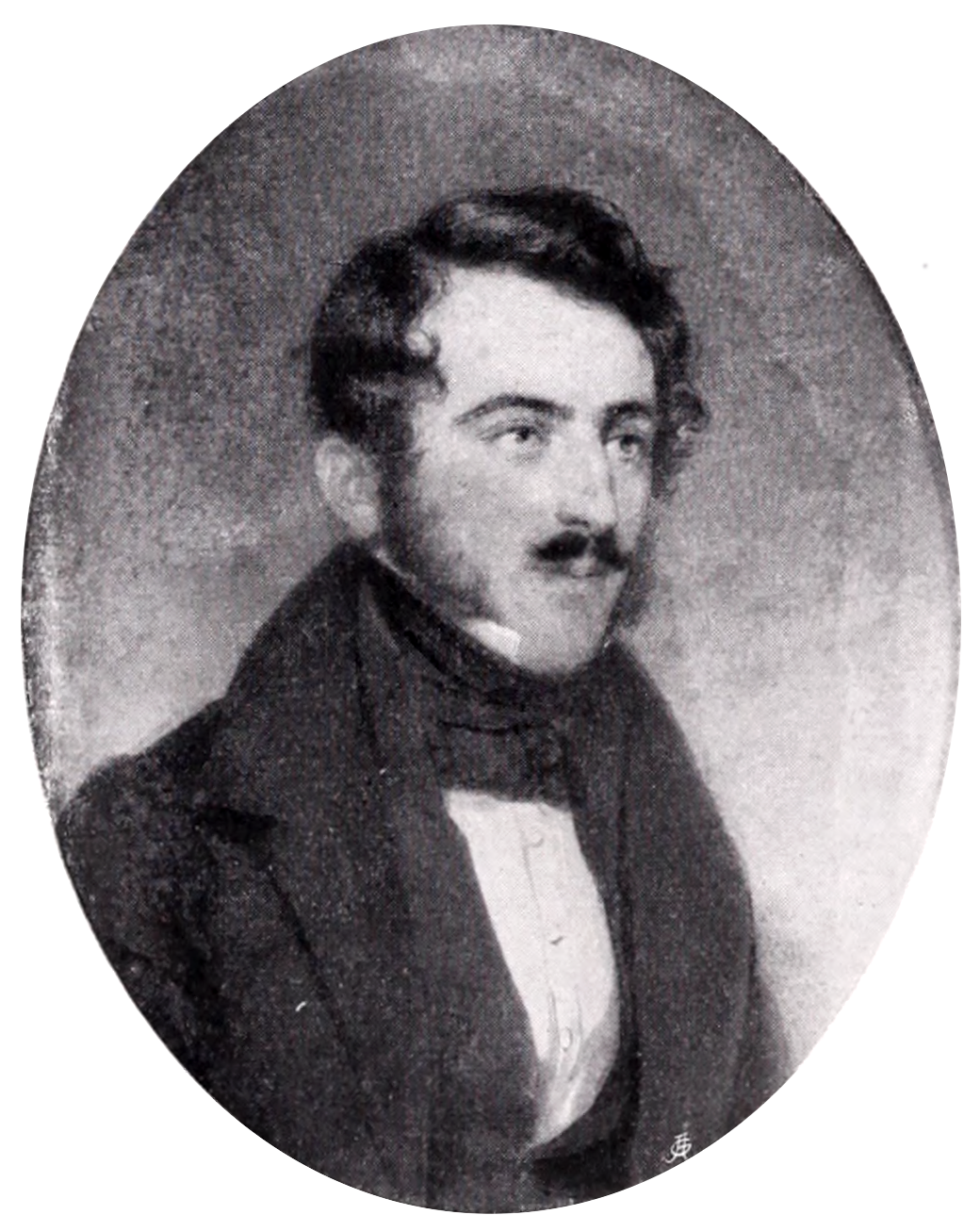
Denis von Eskeles

Fanny von Arnstein’s salon was recognised as the most important during the Congress of Vienna, when Europe’s statesmen and diplomats gathered in the city to discuss the peace settlement that ended the Napoleonic Wars: Cäcilie von Eskeles’ salon was second only to hers in its brilliance.

== Children ==
Cäcilie’s older child Henrika (b.1802) converted to Christianity in 1824 and married Franz Graf von Wimpffen in 1825. Her son Denis (b. 1803) also converted to Christianity, and after his father’s death took over his role in managing the banking house.
