= North Italian Church Music in the Age of Monteverdi =

1984 book by Jerome Roche

- Title page for North Italian Church Music in the Age of Monteverdi (1984)
- Author: Jerome Roche
- Language: English
- Series: Oxford Monographs on Music
- Genre: Non-fiction
- Publisher: Clarendon Press
- Publication date: 1984
- Publication place: United Kingdom

North Italian Church Music in the Age of Monteverdi is a 1984 book by British musicologist Jerome Roche, published by Clarendon Press, as part of their "Oxford Monographs on Music" series.

== Content ==
North Italian Church Music presents an overview of sacred music published by Venetian printing houses in the first half of the seventeenth century. In contrast with many assessments of the period, which focus on the works of Claudio Monteverdi and Giovanni Gabrieli, the book highlights particularly the contributions of composers who are less familiar to modern audiences, such as Ignazio Donati, Alessandro Grandi and Giovanni Rovetta. Many of the pieces that Roche discusses were not available in modern editions at the time the book was published, meaning the inclusion of a larger quantity of illustrative examples than other similar works.

The first section of the book provides a historical and social context for the later chapters. Roche gives an overview of the church's attitude towards changes in musical styles around the turn of the seventeenth century, discusses the musical institutions connected with sacred music, and explores the use of liturgy in motets.

The subsequent four chapters discuss specific works composed between 1605 and 1643, with each chapter focussed on works for a different number of voices. Chapter V discusses pieces for one to three voices, Chapter VI those for four to six voices, and Chapter VII and VIII those for seven or more voices. The book concludes with a short survey of developments during the rest of the seventeenth century.

== Background and publication ==
The book has its origins in Jerome Roche's 1968 PhD dissertation, which was supervised by Denis Arnold at Cambridge University. It was published by Clarendon Press (an imprint of Oxford University Press), as part of their "Oxford Monographs on Music" series.

== Reception ==
Jonathan Glixon, writing in Renaissance Quarterly, praised the book, commenting that it would have a particular value "when the fascinating music discussed by Professor Roche becomes more readily available in print and in recordings". Glixon considered the final chapter of the introduction to be the "best discussion in print of the role of liturgical texts in motets".
