= Mittwochsgesellschaft =

The German word Mittwochsgesellschaft ("Wednesday Society") may refer to the:

- Berliner Mittwochsgesellschaft (1783–1798), or Gesellschaft der Freunde der Aufklärung ("Society of Friends of the Enlightenment")
- Fesslersche Mittwochsgesellschaft (1795–1806) in Berlin
- Neue Mittwochsgesellschaft (1824–1856) in Berlin, founded by Julius Eduard Hitzig
- Berliner Mittwochsgesellschaft (1863–1944), or Freie Gesellschaft zur wissenschaftlichen Unterhaltung ("Free Society for Scholarly Entertainment")
- Vienna Psychoanalytic Society, or Psychologische Mittwochsgesellschaft (1902–1908), founded by Sigmund Freud
- Neue Mittwochsgesellschaft (1996-) founded by Marion Gräfin Dönhoff
