= Alessandro Crivelli =

Italian Roman Catholic bishop and cardinal

Alessandro Crivelli (1514–1574) was an Italian Roman Catholic bishop and cardinal.

== Early life ==
Alessandro Crivelli was born in Milan in 1514, the son of Antonio Crivelli, count of Lomello, and his wife Costanza Landriani. He was related to Pope Urban III.

He entered the military at a young age. He rose to the rank of colonel of the Army of the Holy Roman Empire. He became a member of the senate and Consiglio dei 60 of Milan. He married Margherita de Scarampi and had three children, Antonio, Girolamo, and Luigi.

== Career ==
After the death of his wife on 10 March 1561 he left the military and became a priest. On 10 March 1561 he was elected Bishop of Cozenza and Cariati, and he was subsequently consecrated as a bishop. From November 1561 to November 1565, he was nuncio in Spain.

Pope Pius IV made him a cardinal deacon in the consistory of 12 March 1565. He did not participate in the papal conclave of 1565-66 that elected Pope Pius V. He received the red hat and the deaconry of San Giovanni a Porta Latina (a titular church declared a deaconry pro illa vice) on 8 February 1566. He opted for the order of cardinal priests.

He resigned the government of his diocese sometime before 23 January 1568. On 20 November 1570 he opted for the titular church of Santa Maria in Aracoeli. He participated in the papal conclave of 1572 that elected Pope Gregory XIII.

He died in Rome on 22 December 1574. He was buried in Santa Maria in Aracoeli.
