= Ignaz Moscheles =

Bohemian pianist and composer (1794–1870)

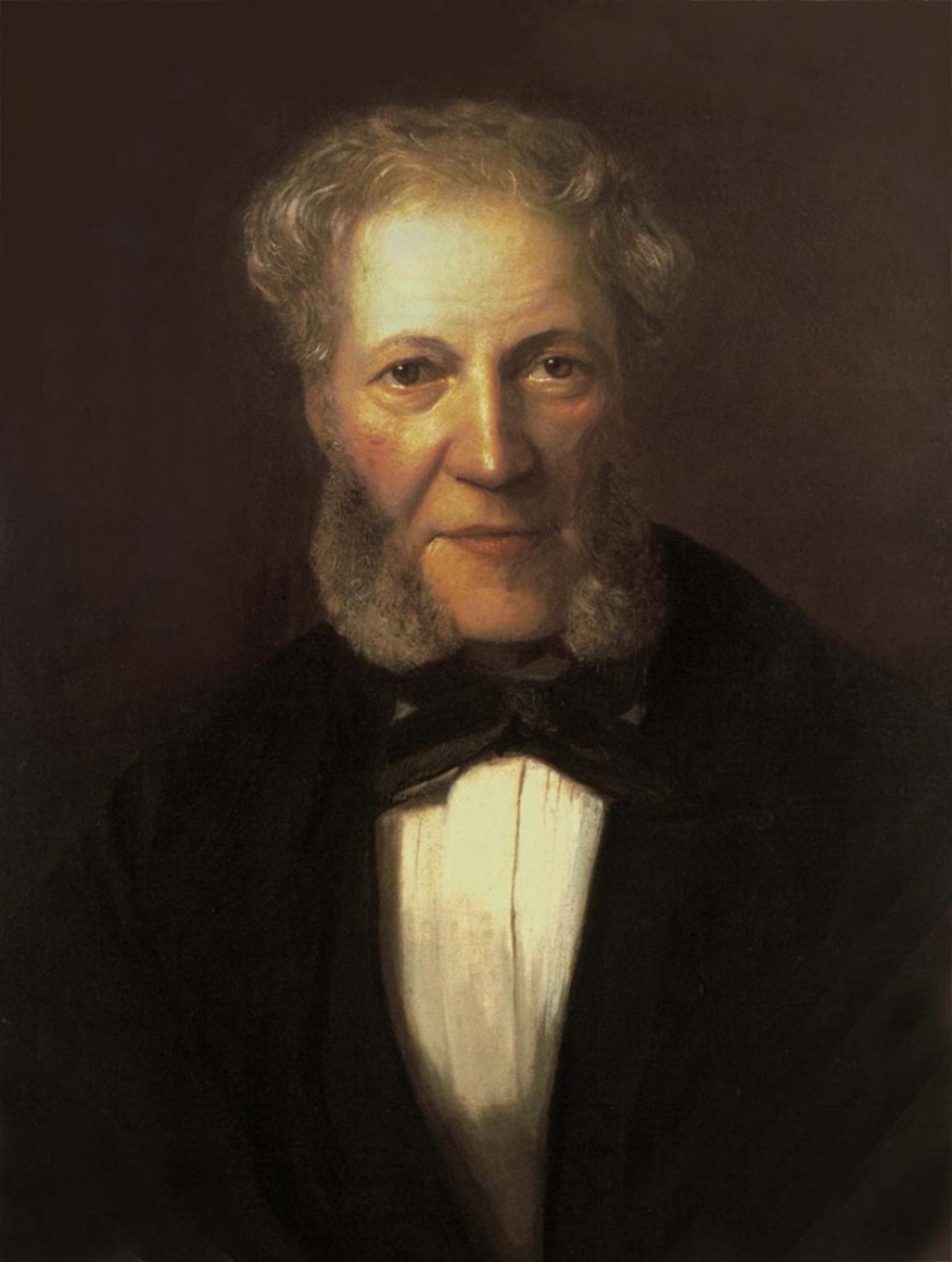
- Moscheles, from a portrait by his son Felix Moscheles, 1860
- Born: Isaac Ignaz Moscheles; 23 May 1794; Prague
- Died: 10 March 1870 (aged 75); Leipzig
- Spouse: Charlotte
- Children: 2 sons and 3 daughters
- Parent(s): Klara Popper (Lieben) and Joachim Moises Moscheles

Isaac Ignaz Moscheles (German pronunciation: [ˈɪɡnaːts ˈmɔʃələs]; 23 May 1794 – 10 March 1870) was a Bohemian piano virtuoso and composer. He was based initially in London and later in Leipzig, where he joined his friend and sometime pupil Felix Mendelssohn as professor of piano in the Conservatory.

== Life ==
=== Early life and career ===
Moscheles was born 1794 in Prague, Bohemia, the son of Klara Popper (Lieben) and Joachim Moises Moscheles. He was from an affluent German-speaking Jewish merchant family. His first name was originally Isaac. His father played the guitar and was keen for one of his children to become a musician. Initially his hopes fixed on Ignaz's sister, but when she demurred, her piano lessons were transferred to her brother. Ignaz developed an early passion for the (then revolutionary) piano music of Beethoven, which the Mozartean Bedřich Diviš Weber, his teacher at the Prague Conservatory, attempted to curb, urging him to focus on Bach, Mozart and Muzio Clementi.

After his father's early death, Moscheles settled in Vienna in 1808. His abilities were such that he was able to study in the city under Albrechtsberger for counterpoint and theory and Salieri for composition. At this time he changed his first name from "Isaac" to "Ignaz". He was one of the leading virtuosi resident in Vienna during the 1814–1815 Congress of Vienna, and it was at this time that he wrote his enormously popular virtuosic Alexander Variations, Op. 32 for piano and orchestra, which he later played throughout Europe. Here, too, he became a close friend of Giacomo Meyerbeer, at that time still a piano virtuoso, not yet a composer; their extemporized piano-duets were highly acclaimed. Moscheles was also familiar with Hummel and Kalkbrenner. Among the virtuosi of the 1820s, Hummel, Kalkbrenner, Cramer, Herz and Weber were his most famous rivals.

While in Vienna, Moscheles was able to meet his idol Beethoven, who was so impressed with the young man's abilities that he entrusted him with the preparation of the piano score of his opera Fidelio, commissioned by his publisher Artaria. At the end of his manuscript, before presenting it to Beethoven, Moscheles wrote the words Fine mit gottes Hülfe ("Finished with God's help"). Beethoven approved Moscheles's version, but appended the words O Mensch, hilf dir selber ("O Man, help thyself!"). Moscheles's good relations with Beethoven were to prove important to both at the end of Beethoven's life.

=== Faith and family ===
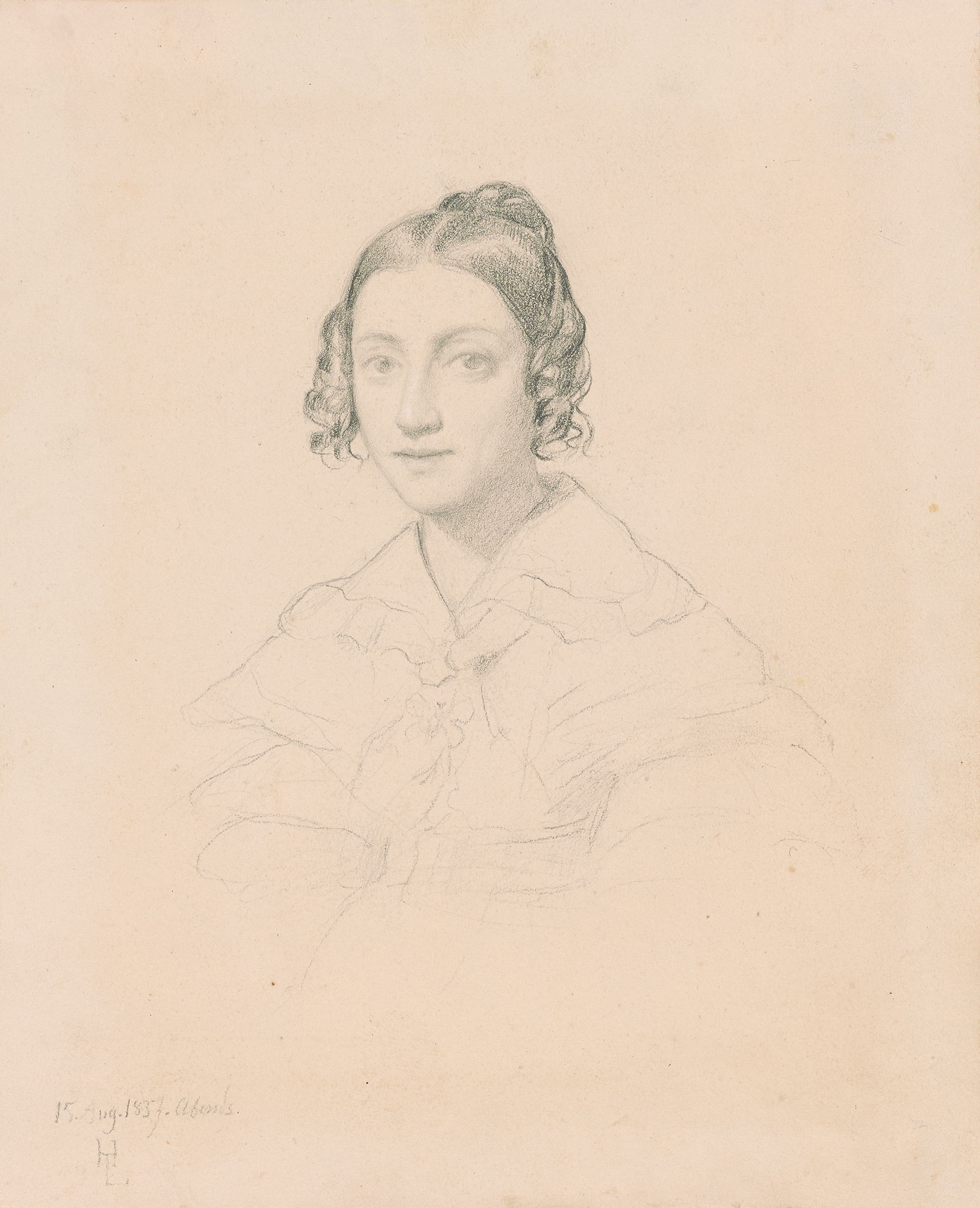
Moscheles married Charlotte Emden (Henri Lehmann,1837)

Moscheles was still a practising Jew in Vienna in 1814–15. His wife noted that he was a member of the congregation in Vienna, and that he wrote for the Vienna Jewish community an oratorio celebrating the peace. Throughout his life, like many other musicians of Jewish origin, he remained close to other musicians of similar descent such as Felix Mendelssohn, Anton Rubinstein, Joseph Joachim and Ferdinand Hiller. He also remained in contact with patrons of Jewish origin such as the Eskeles family in Vienna, the Leo family in Paris, and the Rothschilds in England. He married Charlotte Emden, daughter of a Hamburg Jewish banker and a cousin of Heinrich Heine, in a Hamburg synagogue in 1825. Nonetheless, after he settled in England, Moscheles became a member of the Church of England.

Their children, two sons and three daughters, were all baptised at birth and he and his wife were baptised in 1832. They were parents to the painters Felix (1833–1917), their second son, and Serena Anna Moscheles (1830–1902), their second daughter and wife of Georg Rosen. Rosen was an orientalist like his brother of Friedrich August Rosen, another friend of Mendelssohn, like Moscheles. His granddaughter Jelka Rosen, also a painter, married the composer Frederick Delius. Another granddaughter, Marie-Thérèse, married Henry Fielding Dickens, the son of author Charles Dickens. Moscheles travelled extensively in Europe as a pianist and conductor, eventually settling in London (1825–1846) where his address was 3, Chester Place, near Regent's Park. He became co-director of the Royal Philharmonic Society in 1832. He never disavowed his Jewish origins and frequently took his family to visit his relatives in Prague, all of whom had retained their Jewish allegiances.

Through his Dickens descendants, he is a great-grandfather of Admiral Gerald Charles Dickens and a great-great-great-great-grandfather of actor Harry Lloyd. Through his Roche descendants, he is great-great-grandfather to the musicologist Jerome Roche, and great-great-great-grandfather to historian Helen Roche and electronic musician Mike Paradinas.

=== Mendelssohn and the London period ===
After his Viennese period there followed for Moscheles a sensational series of European concert tours – it was after hearing Moscheles play at Carlsbad that the boy Robert Schumann was fired to become a piano virtuoso himself. But Moscheles found an especially warm welcome in London, where in 1822 he was awarded an honorary membership of the London Academy of Music (later to become the Royal Academy of Music). At the end of the year he wrote in his diary, "I feel more and more at home in England", and he had no hesitation in settling there after his marriage. Moscheles visited most of the great capitals of Europe, making his first appearance in London in 1822, and there securing the friendship of Muzio Clementi and Johann Baptist Cramer. Moscheles was also a student of Muzio Clementi.

In March 1823, Moscheles paid a long visit to Bath in Somerset and started work on his Piano Concerto No. 4 (Op. 64). On an excursion to Bristol, Coleridge says that, "Moscheles delights in the view of the Bristol Channel and adds, "What can be finer than the first view of the Welsh mountains from Clifton? an enchanting panorama? The very place to write an adagio; the blue mountains form such a grand background to this bright channel." The piano concerto had its first performance, in London, shortly afterwards, on 16 June.

Before that, however, in 1824, he had accepted an invitation to visit Abraham Mendelssohn Bartholdy in Berlin to give some lessons to his children Felix and Fanny. His comments on meeting them were: "This is a family the like of which I have never known. Felix, a boy of fifteen is a phenomenon. What are all prodigies compared with him? ... He is already a mature artist. His elder sister Fanny is also extraordinarily gifted." Shortly afterwards he wrote: "This afternoon ... I gave Felix Mendelssohn his first lesson, without losing sight for a moment of the fact that I was sitting next to a master, not a pupil."

Thus began a relationship of extraordinary intensity which lasted throughout and beyond Mendelssohn's life (he died in 1847). Moscheles was instrumental in bringing Felix to London for the first time in 1829 – Abraham entrusted Felix to his care for this visit. Moscheles had carefully prepared for it. In London, apart from becoming a regular and successful performer as well as a musical adviser for the soirées of the Rothschilds, he had become an invaluable aid for Sir George Smart and the Philharmonic Society, advising them of the talents of European musicians he encountered on his own concert-tours. When Smart himself toured Europe in 1825 looking for new music and musicians for the Society, Moscheles furnished Smart with a list of contacts and letters of introduction, including both Beethoven and Mendelssohn. In Prague, Moscheles's brother acted as Smart's guide. Smart visited the Mendelssohns in Berlin and was impressed with both Felix and Fanny. This eventually led to Mendelssohn's invitation to conduct at the Society on his 1829 visit.

In 1827, Moscheles acted as intermediary between the Philharmonic Society and the dying Beethoven. He helped persuade the Society to send Beethoven desperately needed funds during the composer's illness. In return, Beethoven offered to write for the Society his (uncompleted) Tenth Symphony.

Mendelssohn's great success in England from 1829 until the end of his life also reflected well on his friend. Although Moscheles's music was now being looked on as a little old-fashioned, he was heavily in demand as a music teacher and included amongst his pupils many children of the rich and aristocratic classes. He was also appointed "Pianist to Prince Albert", a sinecure, which nevertheless confirmed his status. Child prodigy pianist Elizabeth Jonas, a student of Moscheles, played several command performances at Windsor Castle.

Moscheles never ceased to promote the music of Beethoven and gave many recitals of his music: in 1832 he conducted the London premiere of Beethoven's Missa Solemnis, and he translated A.F. Schindler's biography of Beethoven into English. He was an early exponent of the piano recital – the concert of music for piano alone, the innovation of which is disputed between Liszt and Moscheles. Moscheles gave the first fully public performance of Beethoven's Hammerklavier Sonata in London on 14 March 1839, three years after Liszt had performed it for an invited audience in Paris.

Moscheles notably reintroduced the harpsichord as a solo recital instrument. He also often performed in concert with Mendelssohn in London (and elsewhere) – one great favourite of both musicians were Bach's concerti for multiple keyboard instruments. On these occasions Mendelssohn and Moscheles were renowned for vying with each other in impromptu cadenzas. Performances of the three-harpsichord concerto were given, on one occasion with Thalberg at the third keyboard, on another with Clara Schumann. Moscheles often appeared as a conductor, especially of Beethoven.

=== The Leipzig years ===
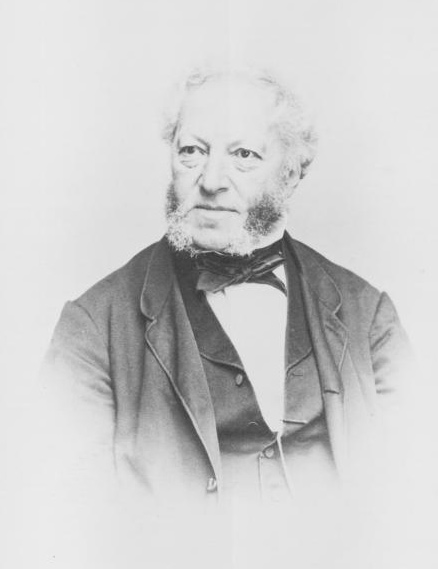
Moscheles in Leipzig

Although throughout this period Moscheles continued to write music and travel on concert tours, he depended heavily on teaching for income, and this placed him under considerable stress. When therefore Mendelssohn established a Conservatory in Leipzig in 1843 he was keen to attract his friend Moscheles there as a colleague, promising him ample time in his schedules for concertising and music-making. After several years, Moscheles gladly accepted the position in 1846. He became a longstanding and prominent member of the Conservatory faculty, teaching piano there for several decades.

The Conservatory became in effect a shrine to Mendelssohn's musical legacy. The critic and pianist Edward Dannreuther, who studied under Moscheles in Leipzig between 1859 and 1863, later wrote:

[...] it was whispered that the two old Grands in the pianoforte-room of the Conservatorium were wont to rehearse Mendelssohn's D minor Concerto all alone by themselves, from 12.30 on Sunday night until cock-crow! Force of habit, probably.

It thus fell to Moscheles to lead the counter-attack on Wagner after the latter's snide attack on Mendelssohn (and Meyerbeer) in his notorious article Das Judenthum in der Musik ("Jewry in Music"), which he did by requesting the resignation from the Conservatory's board of Wagner's editor, Brendel. Like Mendelssohn, Moscheles believed that music had reached its Golden Age during the period Bach to Beethoven, and was suspicious of (although not necessarily antagonistic towards) new directions such as those shown by Wagner, Liszt and Berlioz. Nevertheless, his personal relations with all of these (except perhaps Wagner) remained cordial. The Mendelssohn legacy in Britain meant that the Leipzig Conservatory had a high reputation amongst English musicians and amongst those who studied there during Moscheles's time were Arthur Sullivan and Charles Villiers Stanford.

Moscheles died in Leipzig on 10 March 1870, nine days after attending his last rehearsal with the Leipzig Gewandhaus Orchestra.

== Music ==
Among his 142 opus numbers, Moscheles wrote a number of symphonic works. Apart from an overture, a ballet and a symphony, all are scored for piano and orchestra: eight piano concertos (of which the last is in fragmentary form only, no orchestral parts having survived) and sets of variations and fantasias on folk songs. The main theme of the finale of his fourth piano concerto is based on the tune "The British Grenadiers". Moscheles also left several chamber works (including a piano trio that has been recorded), and a large number of works for piano solo, including sonatas and the études that continued to be studied by advanced students even as Moscheles's music fell into eclipse. There are also some song settings.

More recently, with the modest but noticeable revival of interest in compositions by this composer and those of his colleagues, more of Moscheles's works are being made accessible on compact disc, especially by small and independent record labels. All the completed piano concerti and fantasias for piano and orchestra are available on the Hyperion Records label, played by Howard Shelley, who also conducted the Tasmanian Symphony Orchestra; they have also issued the complete piano studies, played by Piers Lane. Ian Hobson has also recorded the first six and included a pair of variations not recorded by Shelley.

== Sources ==
Much of what is known about Moscheles's life is derived from the biography, with selections from his diaries and correspondence, written after his death by his wife, Charlotte, and published in Germany in 1872; an English edition appeared the following year. The book also gives lively portraits of his era and of his musical contemporaries. The diaries themselves are lost. Another important source is the correspondence between Moscheles and Mendelssohn, preserved at the Brotherton Collection at the University of Leeds, and published in 1888 by Ignaz's son (and Felix Mendelssohn's god-son), Felix Moscheles.

- Anon. (1898). "Edward Dannreuther" in Musical Times 39/688 (1 October 1898).
- Conway, David (2011). Jewry in Music: Entry to the Profession from the Enlightenment to Richard Wagner. Cambridge. ISBN 978-1-107-01538-8.
- Kroll, Mark (2014). Ignaz Moscheles and the Changing World of Musical Europe. Woodbridge. ISBN 978-1-843-83935-4.
- Gotch, Rosamund Brunel (1934) Mendelssohn and His Friends in Kensington: Letters from Fanny and Sophy Horsley, 1833-36. London, OUP (1934)
- Moscheles, Charlotte, tr. A. D. Coleridge, Life of Moscheles, 2 vols. London 1873
- Moscheles, Felix (ed.) (1888). Letters of Felix Mendelssohn to Ignaz and Charlotte Moscheles, London.
- Moscheles, Felix (1899). Fragments of an Autobiography. London.
