= Lea Mendelssohn Bartholdy =

Musical promoter (1777–1842)

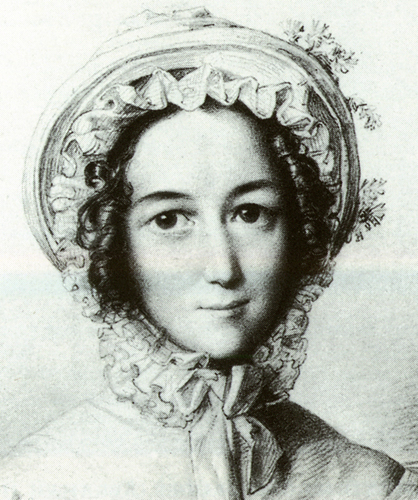
1823 portrait of Lea Mendelssohn by Wilhelm Hensel

Lea Mendelssohn Bartholdy (née Lea Salomon; 15 March 1777 – 12 December 1842) was a musician, musical promoter, and salonièrre. She was the wife of banker and cultural patron Abraham Mendelssohn Bartholdy and mother of the composer Fanny Hensel, the composer Felix Mendelssohn, the singer and salonnière Rebeckah Mendelssohn Dirichlet and the banker and cellist Paul Mendelssohn Bartholdy. A promoter of music and culture, she was the centre of a musical salon in Berlin, which had developed since 1819 from the domestic musical life of the Mendelssohn family and gained considerable importance from 1831 onwards through the activities of her daughter Fanny.

== Early life ==
Lea Mendelssohn was the third of four children of Levin Jakob Salomon (1738–1783) and Bella Salomon (1749–1824). Her mother grew up in a very musical home as the daughter of the Royal Prussian Court Jew Daniel Itzig and his wife Miriam. Like her mother Bella, Lea was probably taught piano by the composer Johann Philipp Kirnberger. A childhood friend described her as "not beautiful, but charming because of her expressive black eyes, her sylph-like figure, her delicate, modest manners and her witty conversation." She had a wide range of literary and musical interests and spoke not only English, French and Italian, but was also able to read Homer's epics in the original language.

== Family life ==
In 1804, Lea Salomon married the banker Abraham Mendelssohn, son of the Jewish Berlin Enlightenment thinker Moses Mendelssohn, whom she met through her friend Henriette, his sister. She had four children with him: Fanny (born 1805), Felix (born 1809), Rebecka (born 1811) and Paul (born 1812), whom she raised according to liberal Enlightenment ideas. In 1816, her children were baptized as Protestants. She and her husband were baptized in 1822. They took the name Bartholdy following its adoption by Lea's brother, the diplomat Jakob Salomon Bartholdy, who had already been baptized in 1805.

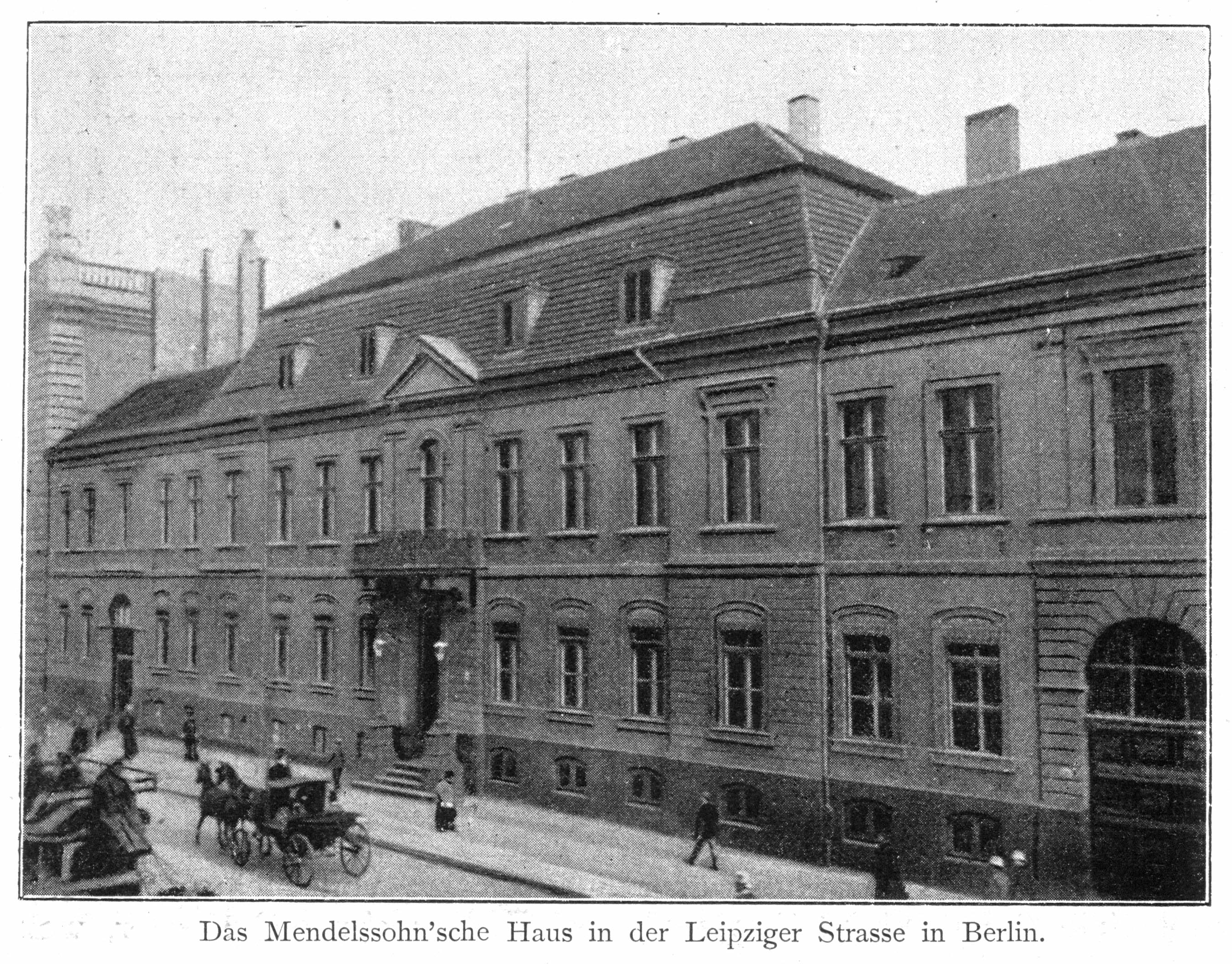
The Mendelssohn house in Leipziger Strasse, Berlin

After her marriage, Lea Mendelssohn lived in Hamburg until 1811. She began to promote culture and music after she returned to her hometown of Berlin in 1811. Having grown up with the Itzig family's appreciation of Bach, she represented a "classical" aesthetic that was oriented towards the content of music and developed something new based on what was tried and tested. She was therefore particularly committed to the music of Mozart, Haydn and Beethoven and supported musicians who disseminated their works. As the first piano teacher of her musically gifted older children, Fanny and Felix, she chose their later piano teachers with great knowledge and in accordance with her own aesthetic convictions.

From 1819 onwards, under her direction, the so-called "musical winter evenings" and the family tradition of celebrating birthdays with music developed into larger musical soirées, in the Mendelssohn house. From 1821 onwards, "Sunday music" was also introduced. This gave her son Felix the opportunity to perform his singspiels, symphonies and concertos together with the music of Mozart and Beethoven with the Royal Court Orchestra. The musical experiences and events in the Mendelssohn house found their way into the extensive correspondence between Lea Mendelssohn and her cousin Henriette von Pereira-Arnstein (1780–1859), through which she also influenced Viennese musical life.

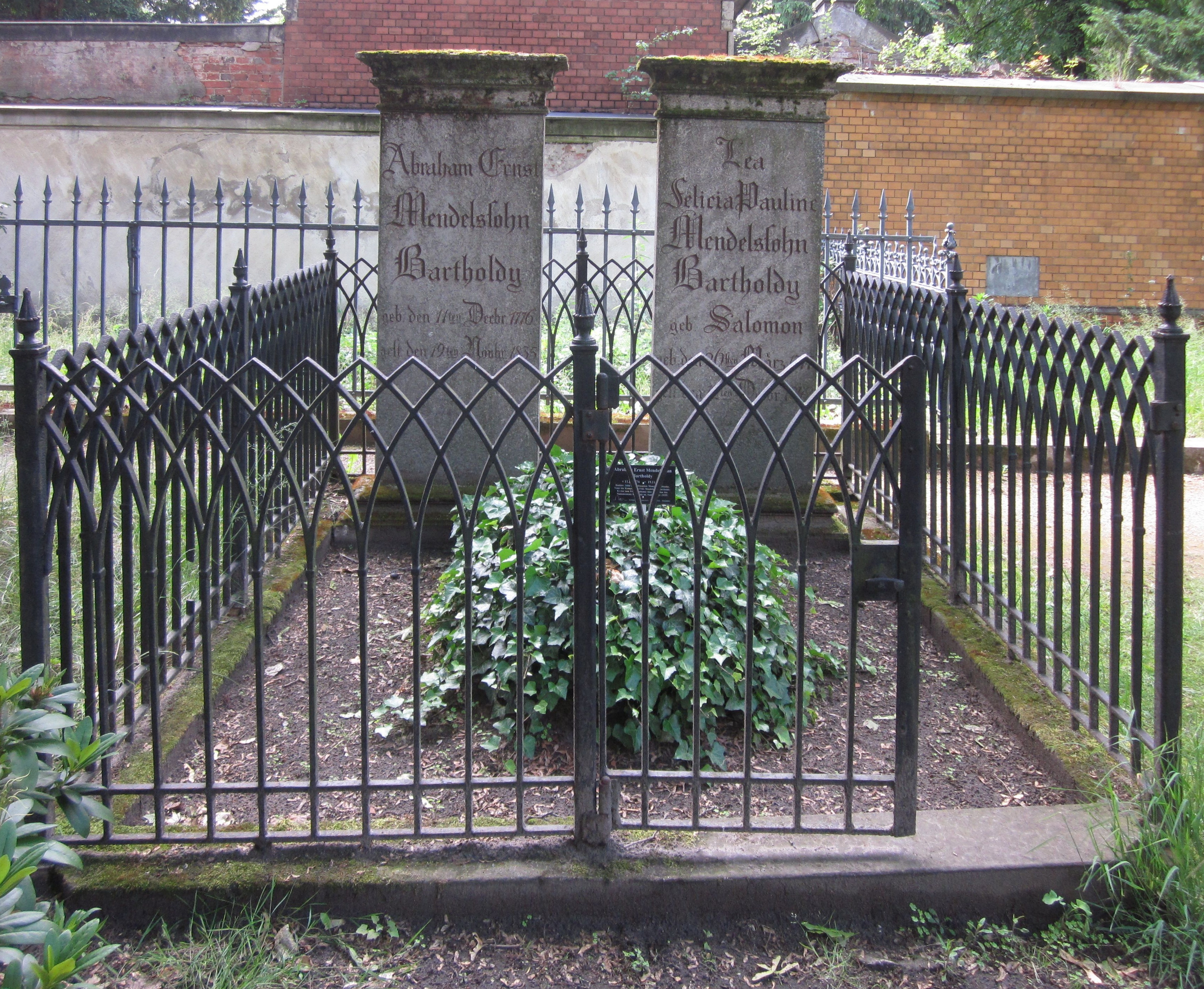
Grave of Lea Mendelssohn Bartholdy

In 1825, the family moved to the former Recke Palace at Leipziger Straße 3 in Berlin, an address that from 1831 onwards, through the activities of her daughter Fanny, was to become the epitome of musical sociability in Berlin. Lea Mendelssohn also continued to organize musical societies in her own rooms.

Lea Mendelssohn Bartholdy died in Berlin in 1842 at the age of 65. She was buried next to her husband Abraham, who had died seven years earlier, in the Trinity Cemetery I in front of the Hallesches Tor. The Hensel/Mendelssohn Bartholdy family burial ground, in which her children Fanny and Felix are buried, as well as the grave of her son Paul, are also located nearby. Lea Mendelssohn Bartholdy's final resting place (grave location DV1-1-1) was dedicated as an honorary grave of the state of Berlin from 1952 to 2015.
