= Club of Thirteen =

The Club of Thirteen or Wednesday Society was a Radical intellectual club in London founded by David Williams in the 1770s.

Resembling the Birmingham Lunar Society, its members included Benjamin Franklin, Richard Lovell Edgeworth, Josiah Wedgwood, Robert Owen, William Hodgson, and Thomas Day. It met at Old Slaughter's Coffee House on St Martin's Lane, or at the "Swan" at Westminster Bridge.

== Bibliography ==
- Nicholas Hans. "Franklin, Jefferson, and the English Radicals at the End of the Eighteenth Century." Proceedings of the American Philosophical Society, 98: 6 (Dec 1954), 406–26.
- Sheldon Samuel Cohen. British supporters of the American revolution, 1775-1783: the role of the "middling-level" activists. Boydell Press, 2004. Pages 27 and 28.
