= Antonio Pestalozza =

Italian politician and Rector of Milan

Antonio Pestalozza (1784–1865) was an Italian politician and a rector of Milan.

Preceded by	Rector of Milan; 1849–1856	Succeeded by
