= The Seventeenth Century (journal) =

The Seventeenth Century is a quarterly peer-reviewed academic journal covering research on the 17th century published by Taylor & Francis. It is abstracted and indexed in the Arts & Humanities Citation Index.

== See also ==
- List of history journals
