= Giovanni Crivelli (painter) =

Italian painter

Giovanni Crivelli (active 1730–1750, died 1760, Parma) was an Italian painter of the late-Baroque, who specialized in animal scenes, often game in a landscape. Little is known of his life; he was the son and trainee of the painter Angelo Maria Crivelli.

== Sources ==
- CREDEM collection in Reggio Emilia
