= Julius Eduard Hitzig =

German writer and civil servant

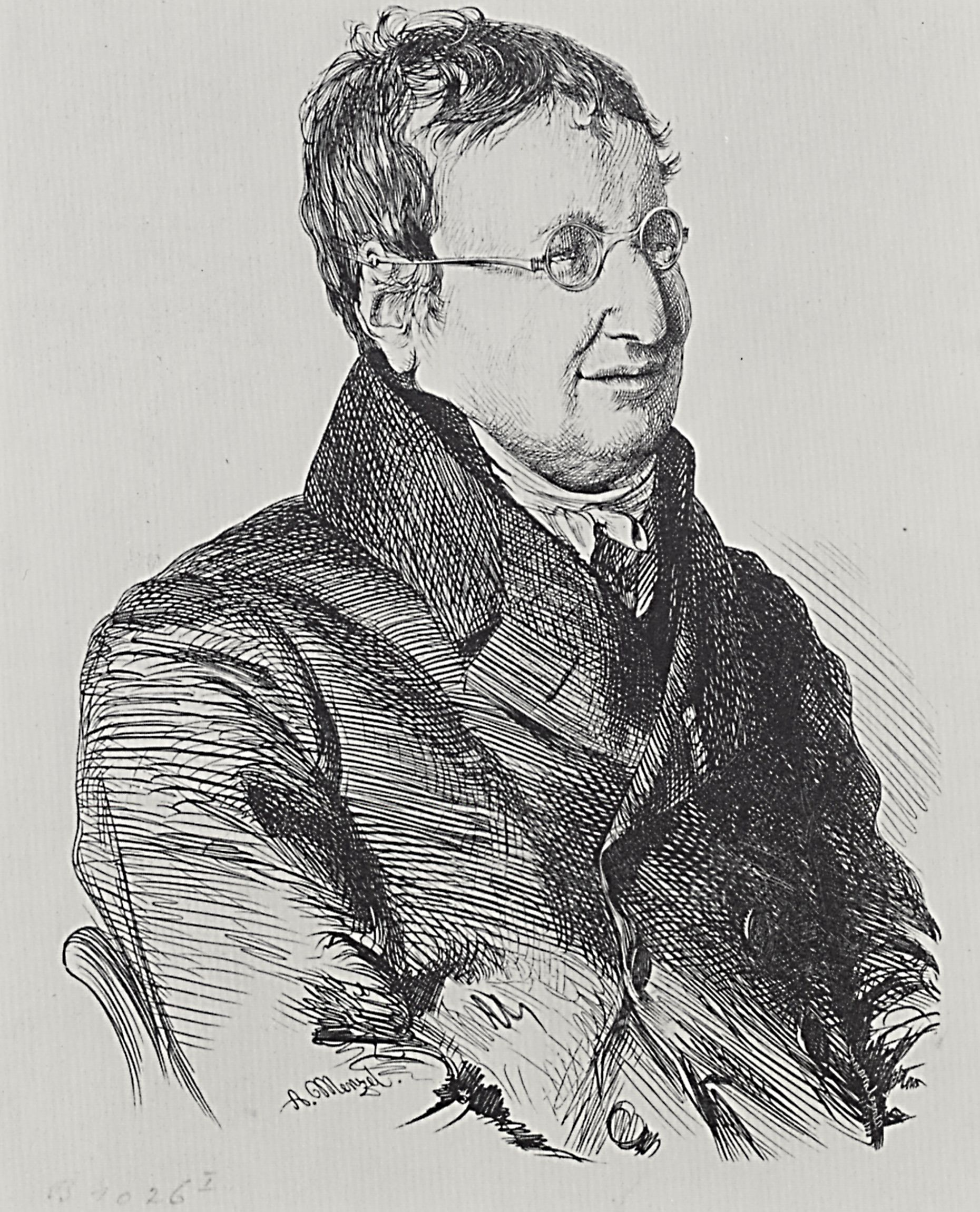
- Julius Eudard Hitzig, illustration by Adolph von Menzel
- Born: 26 March 1780; Berlin
- Died: 26 November 1849 (aged 69); Berlin
- Occupation: Writer
- Writing career
- Notable work: Der Neue Pitaval

Julius Eduard Hitzig, born Isaac Elias Itzig (26 March 1780 – 26 November 1849), was a German author and civil servant.

Born into the wealthy and influential Jewish Itzig family, he was a Prussian civil servant between 1799 and 1806, became Criminal Counsel at the Berlin Supreme Court in 1815 and its director in 1825. In 1808, he established a publishing house and later a bookstore.

Hitzig was much involved in the Berlin literary life of his period, notably in connection with the salon of Rahel Varnhagen. He was friendly with E.T.A. Hoffmann, August von Kotzebue, Adelbert von Chamisso, Friedrich de la Motte Fouqué and Willibald Alexis. He was lampooned for his name change by Heinrich Heine.

His works include Der Neue Pitaval (several volumes).
