= Giovanni Francesco Crivelli =

Italian priest and mathematician (1690–1743)

Giovanni Francesco Crivelli FRS
- Born: September 20, 1691; Venice, Republic of Venice
- Died: 14 February 1743 (aged 51); Venice, Republic of Venice
- Occupations: Catholic priest; Mathematician; Physicist
- Parent(s): Marcello Crivelli and Lavinia Crivelli (née Minelli)

Academic background
- Doctoral advisor: Francesco Venceslao Barkovich
- Influences: Galileo Galilei; René Descartes; Gottfried Wilhelm Leibniz; Isaac Newton

Giovanni Francesco Crivelli FRS (20 September 1690 – 20 September 1743) was an Italian Catholic priest and scientist. Crivelli was a member of the Order of Clerics Regular of Somasca in the Cloister of the Health, before becoming provincial Father of the order and rector of the Seminar of Murano.

== Writings ==
He published two teaching books, the Elements of Numeral and Literal Arithmetic (published in Venice in 1728), and the Elements of Physics (published in Venice in 1731 and subsequently broadened in 1744). His original manuscripts are lost.

The second book is particularly important for a number of reasons. It is a popular teaching book whose first volume contains material still used today in High School science classes (with the exception of electro-magnetic phenomena, considered at that time as little more than a novelty phenomenon). The book also discusses astronomical matters. The book notes the full reception of the physics of Galileo and of Newton with Galileo called "the prince of the scientists", and a full recognition of the importance of the Arabic Muslim civilisation in the creation of the scientific method. The explanation of the scientific method coincides practically with the positions of neopositivism and of scientific realism. The writing style is innovative and still relevant for its use of the Italian language, for the detailed and precise descriptions of many experiments, including those carried out outside Europe, and for demonstrating the varied hypotheses of scientists related to arguments under discussion in those years. Also of note is the recognition of the existence of theoretical physics, and its equal importance alongside experimental physics.

His activity was also highly valued outside of Italy. Crivelli was elected in January 1734 as a Fellow of the Royal Society (his books are in the library of the Royal Society). After his death, he was soon forgotten and his work was only recently re-discovered.

== Bibliography ==
- De Ferrari, Augusto (1985). "CRIVELLI, Giovanni Francesco". Dizionario Biografico degli Italiani (in Italian). Vol. 31: Cristaldi–Dalla Nave. Rome: Istituto dell'Enciclopedia Italiana. ISBN 978-88-12-00032-6.
