= Jakob Salomon Bartholdy =

Prussian diplomat and art patron

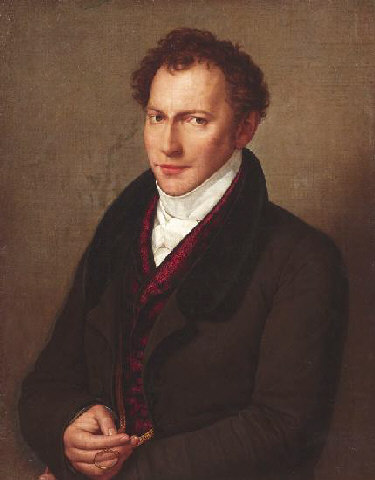
Jakob Salomon Bartholdy oil on canvas by Carl Joseph Begas

Jakob Ludwig Salomon Bartholdy (13 May 1779 – 27 July 1825) was a Prussian diplomat and art patron.

== Life ==
He was born Jakob Salomon in Berlin of Jewish parentage. His father was Levin Jakob Salomon and his mother was Bella Salomon, née Bella Itzig. Jakob was educated at the University of Halle. He took the additional surname Bartholdy from a property owned by his family on his conversion to Reformed Christianity.

Bartholdy fought in the Austrian army against Napoleon, afterward entered the diplomatic service of Prussia, and accompanied the Allied armies to Paris in 1814, whence he was dispatched to Rome in the following year as Prussian Consul-General. He was a great patron of the arts. The revival of fresco painting amongst young German artists in Italy was due largely to his patronage. A group of artists composed of Johann Friedrich Overbeck, Peter von Cornelius, Philipp Veit, and Friedrich Wilhelm Schadow decorated a room of his palace with frescoes. His valuable collection of antiques was bought for the Berlin Museum of Art, while the frescos of his mansion at Rome, the so-called Casa Zuccari, were transferred by Stefano Bardini in 1886-87 to the Berlin National Gallery.

He is buried in the Protestant Cemetery, Rome.

== Family ==
Bartholdy’s sister Lea Salomon was married to Abraham Mendelssohn, whom Bartholdy persuaded to adopt his own “Christian” surname — to differentiate the family from its connection with Abraham's father, the philosopher Moses Mendelssohn. Their son and Bartholdy’s nephew; the composer Felix Mendelssohn would carry on the name Bartholdy surname as would his brother Paul Mendelssohn.

== See also ==
- Itzig family

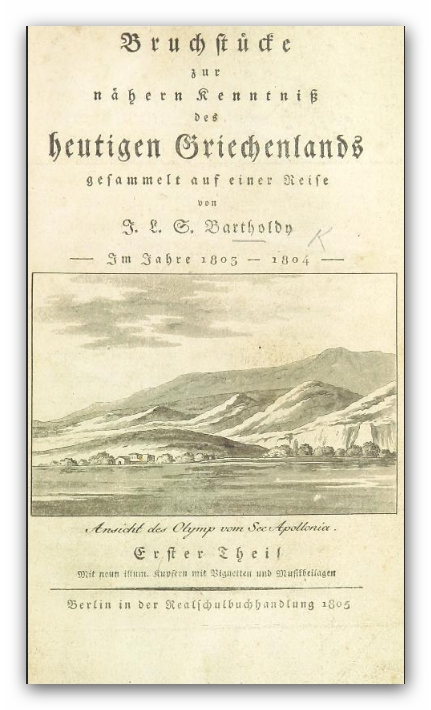
BARTHOLDY: Bruchstücke einer Reise ... nach Griechenland
