= Sing-Akademie zu Berlin =

Musical society in Berlin

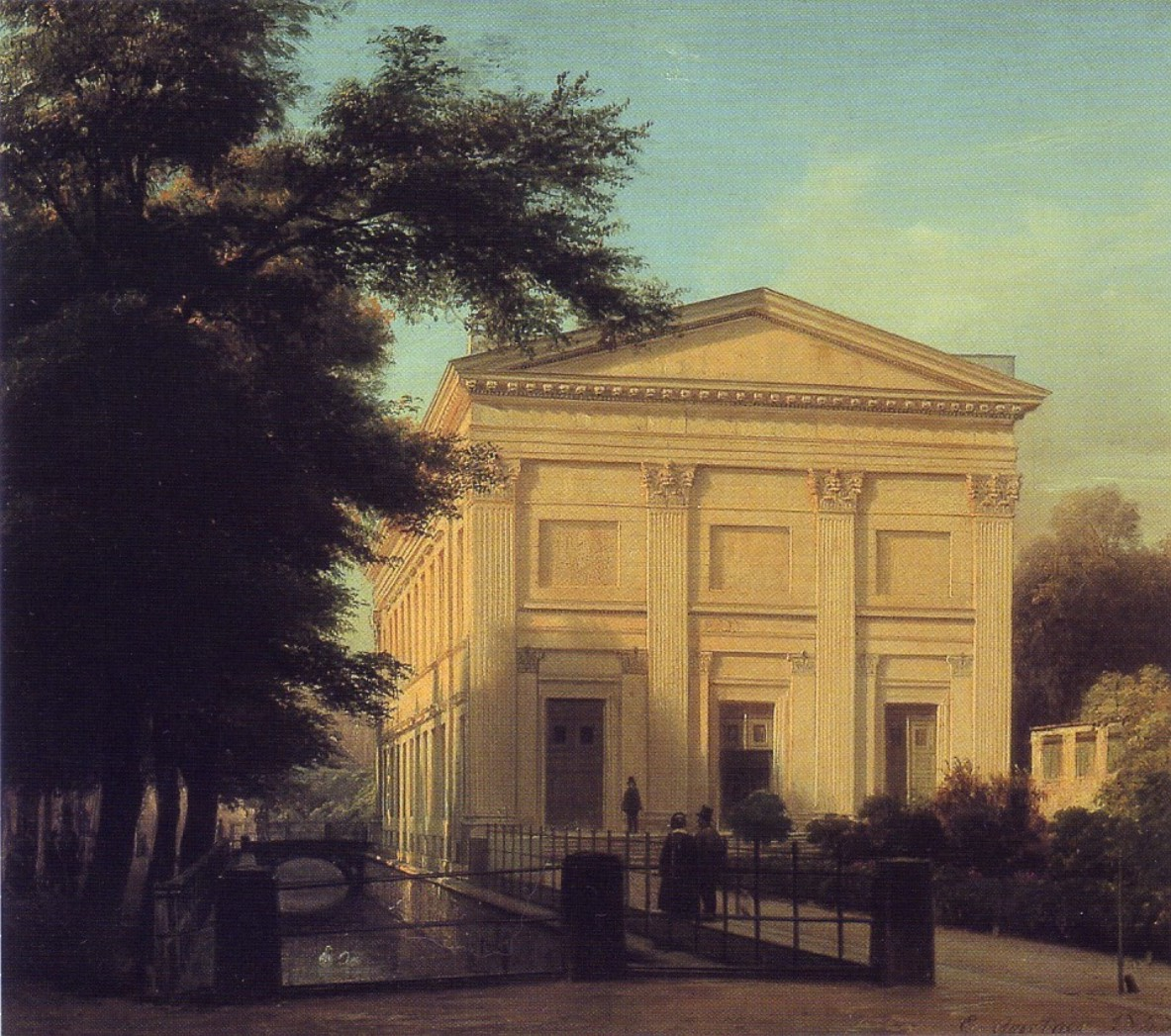
The Singakademie in 1843 (Designed by Carl Theodor Ottmer; painting by Eduard Gaertner)

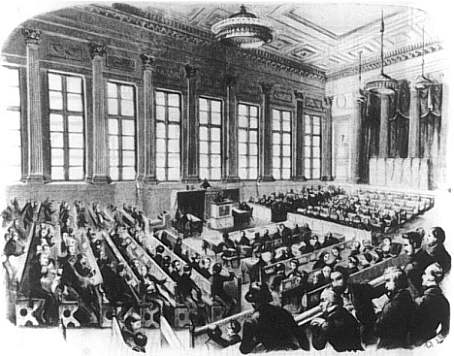
Constituent Session of the Prussian National Assembly at the Sing-Akademie in Berlin, 1848

The Sing-Akademie zu Berlin, also known as the Berliner Singakademie, is a musical (originally choral) society founded in Berlin in 1791 by Carl Friedrich Christian Fasch, harpsichordist to the court of Prussia, on the model of the 18th-century London Academy of Ancient Music.

== Early history ==
The origins of the Singakademie are difficult to discern because the group was initially intended as a private gathering of music lovers and only later became a public institution. The Singakademie grew out of a small circle of singers who met regularly in the garden house of the privy councillor Milow. Their weekly meetings seemed to have resembled those of the then popular Singethees. Carl Friedrich Zelter describes them as rather informal meetings: "One gathered in the evening, drank tea, spoke, talked, in short entertained oneself; and the matter itself was only secondary." Singer and songwriter Charlotte Caroline Wilhelmine Bachmann was one of the original founding members.

Until the early nineteenth century, most musical concert and opera performances consisted of the music of living composers. The Akademie was intended by Fasch to revive music of the past as well as to perform that of the present. In fact its first performance was a 16-part Mass by Fasch himself, but it also regularly performed music by J. S. Bach and other earlier masters. Fasch had been a pupil of Johann Sebastian Bach's son C. P. E. Bach and instilled the devotion to Bach that has been a continuing feature of the Akademie. By the time of Fasch's death on 3 August 1800 the Akademie had about 100 members, and had received many notable visitors keen to experience its unique sound, including Beethoven who came in June 1796. In 1792, a performance at Marienkirche marked one of the first known times when men and women sang sacred music together.

After Fasch's death, his pupil Carl Friedrich Zelter became leader of the Akademie, continuing Fasch's ambitions and objectives. In 1807 he began an orchestra to accompany the Akademie, and in 1808 he founded a men's choir ('Liedertafel'), which became a model for similar choirs flourishing in the early nineteenth century and dedicated to German national music.

The members of the Akademie were originally drawn from the wealthy bourgeois of Berlin. Akademie was also one of the first community choirs where amateur musicians were able to perform in choral performances. From early days they also included members of some of Berlin's wealthiest Jewish families, including the Itzig family and descendants of Moses Mendelssohn. These families were to have a significant influence on the history of the Akademie. Moses Mendelssohn's son, Abraham joined the Akademie in 1793 and Itzig's granddaughter, Lea Salomon, in 1796. They were later to marry and their children Felix and Fanny were leading members of the Akademie in the 1820s.

The Akademie appointed several women to be a part of the board of directors. Of the six members on the board, three of them were women.

== Library ==
Itzig's daughter (and hence Felix's great-aunt) Sarah Levy (1761-1854), a fine keyboard player who had been taught by Wilhelm Friedemann Bach, played concerti by Bach and others in many Akademie concerts and at Zelter's "Ripienschule" in the period 1806–1815. Her large collection of manuscripts of music of the Bach family, together with many others acquired by Abraham Mendelssohn from the widow of C. P. E. Bach, were left to the Akademie. Zelter also had a fine collection of Bach and Bach family manuscripts which he gave to the Akademie. By these means it acquired one of the finest collections of Bachiana in the world. The collection was looted by the Red Army in 1945 and hidden in the Kyiv Conservatory, but was returned to Germany after its rediscovery in 2000. (See link for the story). Today, the collection is temporarily housed in the music section of the Berlin State Library.

== Later history ==
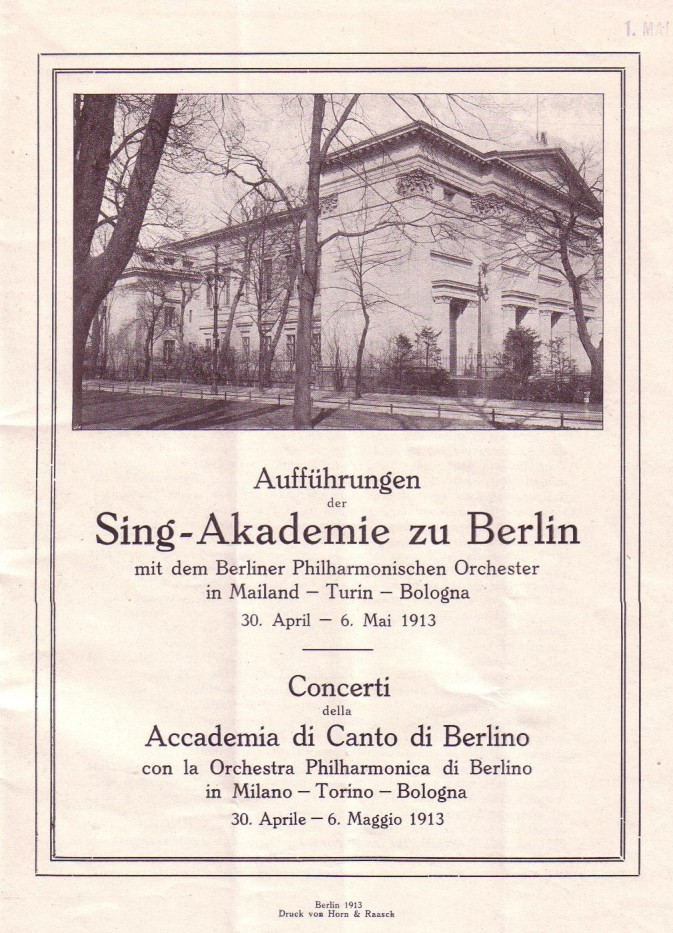
Program book for the concert held in Milan, accompanied by Berlin Philharmonic, 1913

By 1826, the Akademie had about 374 members. The success of the Akademie encouraged the founding of a new and permanent home. This was established in 1827 at a plaza near Unter den Linden and became a major Berlin concert hall, at which many famous musicians were to give concerts, including Paganini, Schumann, and Brahms. On 11 March 1829, the 20-year-old Felix Mendelssohn, who was himself a pupil of Zelter, conducted here his famous revival of Bach's St Matthew Passion, a major milestone in re-establishing its composer's reputation as a founding father of European musical traditions.

From November 1827 to April 1828, Alexander von Humboldt, Prussia's most famous naturalist and scholar, gave sixteen public lectures about nature's 'cosmos' at the Singakademie and earned much praise across social classes for his performance.

In 1832 on the death of Zelter, Mendelssohn had some hopes of succeeding him, but in the event the post went to the older, mediocre, but 'safe pair of hands' of Carl Friedrich Rungenhagen (1778–1851). Subsequent directors of the Akademie were:

- August Eduard Grell (1853–76)
- Martin Traugott Blumner (1876–1900)
- Georg Schumann (1900–50)
- Mathieu Lange (1950–73)
- Hans Hilsdorf (1973–99)
- Joshard Daus (2002–06)
- Kai-Uwe Jirka (2006–present)

After the separation between East and West Berlin, the Berliner Singakademie was founded in 1963 in East Berlin. This other Berliner Singakademie is a leading oratory choir in the united Berlin today.
