= Abraham Mendelssohn Bartholdy =

German banker (1776–1835)

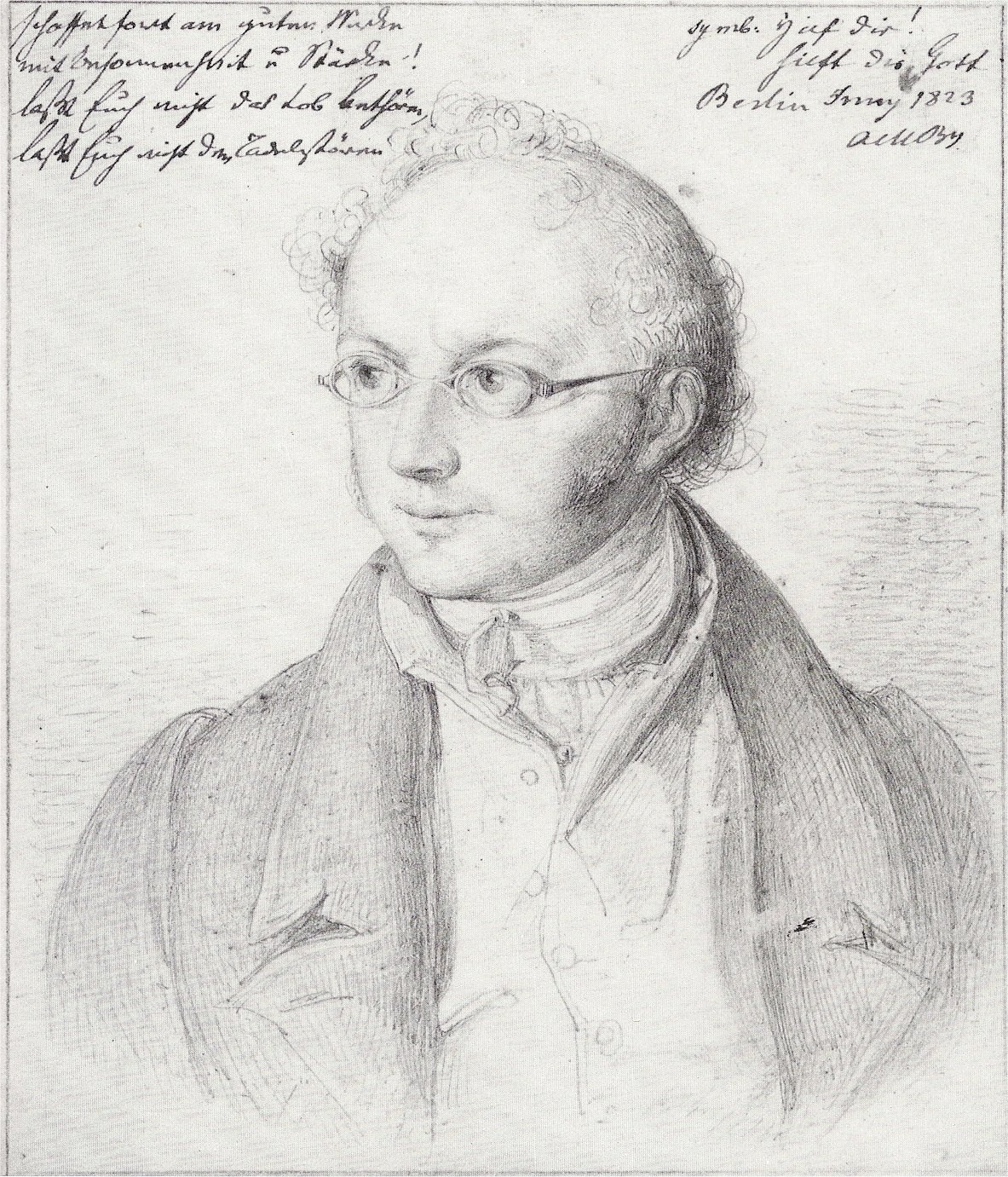
Abraham Mendelssohn Bartholdy, as drawn by his son-in-law Wilhelm Hensel

Abraham Ernst Mendelssohn Bartholdy (born Abraham Mendelssohn; 10 December 1776 – 19 November 1835) was a German Jewish banker and philanthropist. He was the father of Fanny Mendelssohn, Felix Mendelssohn, Rebecka Mendelssohn, and Paul Mendelssohn.

== Early life ==
Mendelssohn was born and died in Berlin. The son of the philosopher Moses Mendelssohn, Abraham is supposed to have complained to a friend, "Once I was the son of a famous father, now I am the father of a famous son."

By the time of Moses's death in 1786, the Mendelssohn family was well established and wealthy. In line with Moses's ideas that German Jews should participate in German as well as Jewish culture Abraham had a liberal education. He was one of the founding members of the Jewish liberal society Gesellschaft der Freunde in 1792, but also of the Sing-Akademie zu Berlin founded in 1793. In 1796 his future wife Lea Salomon, a granddaughter of Daniel Itzig, also joined the Akademie; but they had probably met before that.

In 1797, Abraham went to study banking in Paris at the behest of his brother Joseph, who had formed the banking house of Mendelssohn and Friedlaender in association with Daniel Itzig's grandson, Moses Friedlaender. French life did not appeal to him. In 1804 Abraham married Lea in Hamburg, where he managed an office of the family bank. Somewhere around this time he seems to have acquired from Lea's acquaintance with the musician Georg Poelchau a number of manuscripts of C. P. E. Bach (of whom Poelchau was the executor), which he gave to his aunt, the musician Sara Levy, who subsequently donated them to the Singakademie.

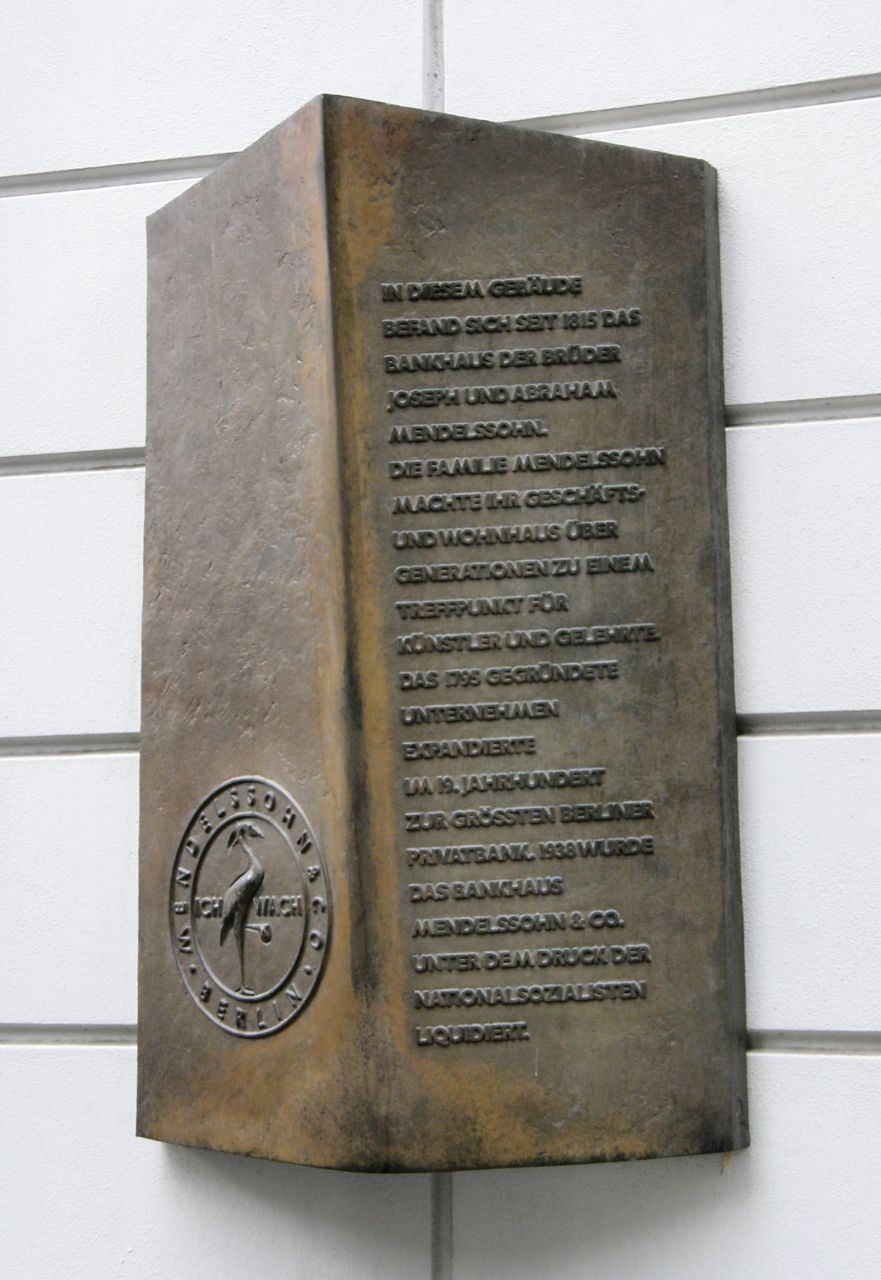
Memorial plaque on the site of the Mendelssohn Bank at Jägerstraße 51, Berlin

In 1804, Abraham Mendelssohn became a partner in his brother Joseph's banking company. The cooperation lasted until 1822. The private bank which later was renamed into Mendelssohn & Co., existed on the Jägerstraße in Berlin from 1815 until the end of 1938, when it was liquidated under Nazi pressure.

== Life in Berlin ==
In 1811, the French occupation of Hamburg and decline of trade caused Abraham and his family to return to Berlin. Both Felix, born 1809, and his elder sister Fanny, born 1805, showed signs of remarkable musical talent and this was encouraged in both of them, although Abraham felt, conventionally, that whilst it might lead to a career for Felix it could only be a pastime for Fanny. He entrusted Felix to the tuition of Carl Friedrich Zelter, who in 1801 had taken over the direction of the Singakademie. He later engaged the pianist Ignaz Moscheles to give his children some lessons, and this led to a lasting association between Moscheles and the family. When Felix made his first visit to England in 1829 Abraham entrusted him to Moscheles's care; and when Abraham himself later visited London he stayed with Moscheles. The Mendelssohn household in Berlin was often the setting for concerts and at many of these semi-domestic occasions the early music of Felix was performed and Felix and Fanny themselves played.

Abraham and Lea had two other children: Rebecka (b. 1811), who married the mathematician Peter Gustav Lejeune Dirichlet; and Paul (b. 1812), a banker. In 1825 Abraham was elected a town councillor in Berlin.

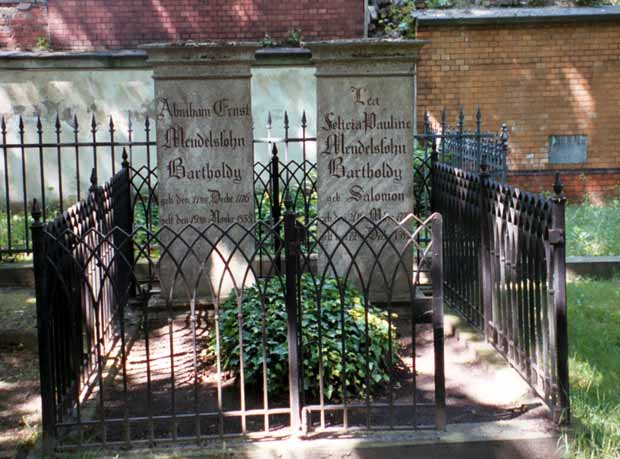
Grave of Abraham and Lea Mendelssohn Bartholdy

Abraham and his wife are buried close to three of their children and their graves are preserved in the Trinity Church Cemetery No. 1 in Berlin.

== Attitude to Judaism ==
Abraham took an uncompromising attitude towards his Jewish origins. He felt that the day of Judaism was over and that it was necessary to take practical steps to assimilate with German society. To this end he and Lea took the (then) daring decision not to have their sons Felix and Paul circumcised after their births in 1809 and 1812 respectively, although this led to arguments with Lea's mother. He further took the advice of Lea's brother Jakob to change his surname. Jakob had adopted the name Bartholdy after a property which he had acquired, and Abraham, too, chose to take this name. As he was to write later to Felix, urging his son to drop the Mendelssohn name and use only Bartholdy because of the fame of Moses Mendelssohn, "there can no more be a Christian Mendelssohn than a Jewish Confucius." Despite this, Felix continued to use both names himself, and his public tended to use only 'Mendelssohn'. Abraham's children were brought up at first without any religious education; they were baptised in 1816, and Abraham and Lea were baptised on 4 October 1822 in Frankfurt am Main in the Calvinist French Reformed Church, that is, well away from their friends and relatives in Berlin. Their son Felix later married the daughter of the former minister of that church.

== Sources ==
- Sebastian Hensel, tr. Carl Klingemann, The Mendelssohn Family 1729–1847: From Letters and Journals, 4th ed. 2 vols, London 1884
