= Crivello =

Crivello is an Italian surname. Notable people with the surname include:

- Anthony Crivello (born 1955), American actor and singer
- Max Crivello (born 1958), Italian artist, illustrator, and cartoonist
- Roberto Crivello (born 1991), Italian footballer

== See also ==
- 20690 Crivello, a main-belt asteroid
