= Angiolo Mario Crivelli =

Italian painter

Angiolo Mario Crivelli, also known as Crivellone, (Milan, 1658–1730) was an Italian painter, mainly of scenes containing animals. it is unclear if he was of the family of the 15th century Lombard painters, Vittorio and Francesco Crivelli.

His son, Giovanni Crivelli (il Crivellino, died 1760), painted still lifes with fish and hunted game. He worked for the court in Parma.
