= Henriette von Pereira-Arnstein =

Austrian pianist and salon-holder

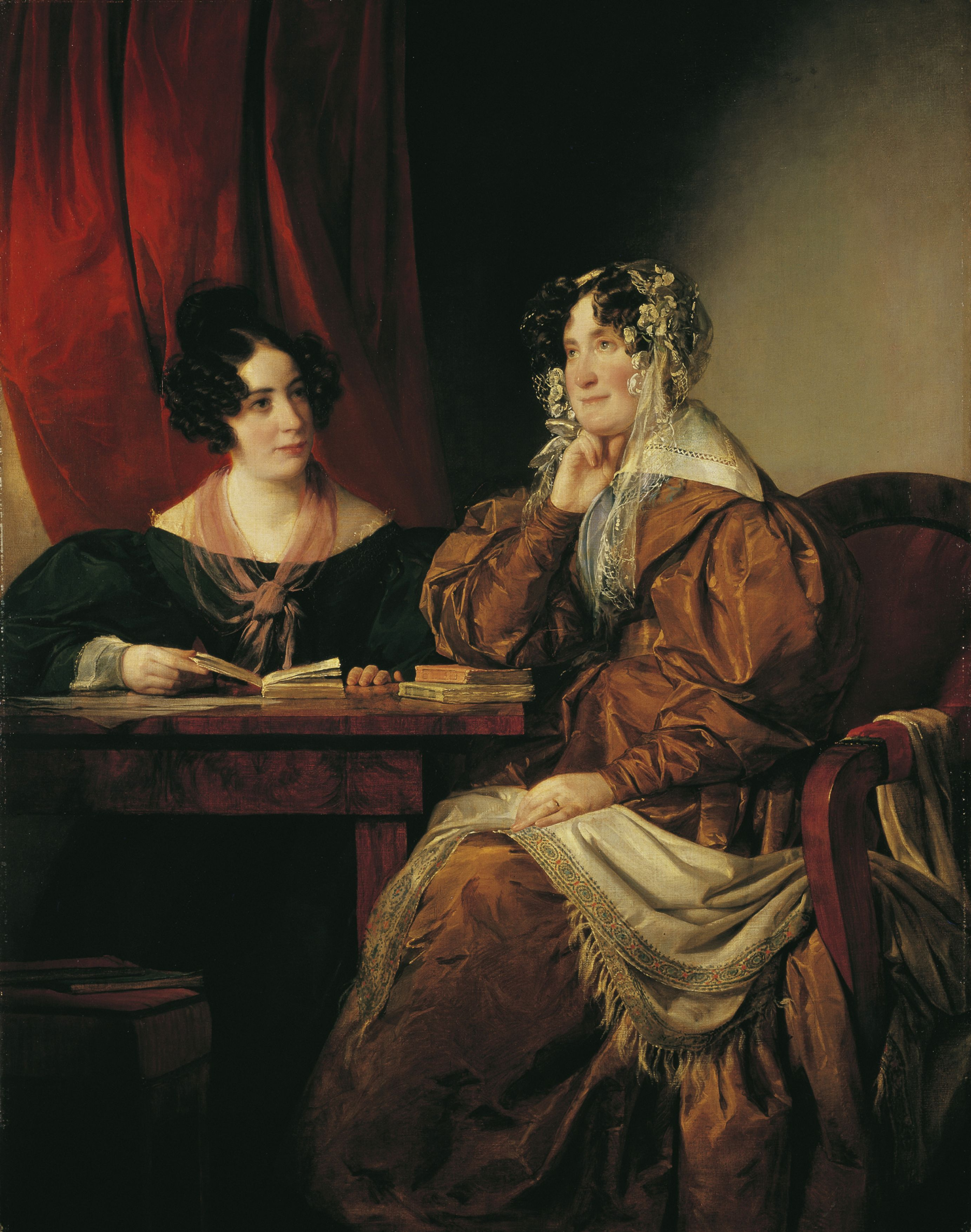
- Henriette von Pereira-Arnstein with her daughter Flora, by Friedrich von Amerling

Background information
- Born: 29 November 1780; Berlin
- Died: 13 May 1859 (aged 78) Vienna
- Instrument: Piano
- Spouse: Baron Heinrich von Pereira

Baroness Henriette von Pereira-Arnstein (29 November 1780 – 13 May 1859) was an Austrian pianist and salon-holder.

== Early life ==
Henriette von Pereira-Arnstein was born in Berlin in 1780, daughter of the Viennese banker Baron Nathan von Arnstein and Baroness Fanny von Arnstein, who maintained an upper-class salon in Vienna frequented by artists, musicians, diplomats and politicians.

Henriette was educated at her parents' home, and she studied the piano with Muzio Clementi and Johann Andreas Streicher.

=== Salon ===
After the death of her mother in 1818, she continued her mother's salons, but on a smaller scale and less formally. They took place on Fridays and there were musical performances, including herself as pianist. Her guests included musicians Ludwig van Beethoven, Felix Mendelssohn and Franz Liszt; and poets Franz Grillparzer, Theodor Körner and Clemens Brentano. She had a strong friendship with Theodor Körner, and his song cycle Leier und Schwert ("Lyre and Sword") was written for her.

Like her mother, she was involved in many charities; she was director of the Marienspital in Baden bei Wien. She died in Vienna in 1859.

== Personal life ==
In 1802, she married the banker Baron Heinrich von Pereira (1773–1835); they had three sons and a daughter. Their son Ludwig von Pereira-Arnstein (1803–1858) was a banker and a director of the state railway; he had a palace built in Vienna by Ludwig Förster.

Henriette died in Vienna on 13 May 1859.
