= Giovanni Battista Crivelli =

Italian composer

Giovanni Battista Crivelli (died March 1652) was an Italian composer.
