= Daniel Itzig =

German banker (1723–1799)

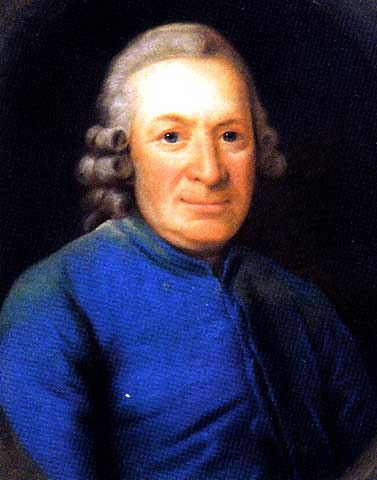
Daniel Itzig

Daniel Itzig (also known as Daniel Yoffe; 18 March 1723 in Berlin – 17 May 1799 in Potsdam) was a court Jew of Kings Frederick II and Frederick William II of Prussia.

== Biography ==
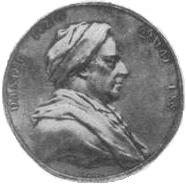
Medal posted for Daniel Itzig's 70th birthday in 1793

Itzig was born in Berlin. His family was mercantile. Itzig was a banker and a mintmaster in partnership with Veitel Heine Ephraim. Together they leased all the mints in Saxony and Prussia. During the Seven Years' War they assisted Frederick the Great in debasing the Saxonian currency and spreading the Ephraimiten, not only in Saxony, but also in Silesia, Poland, Bohemia and Courland.

Itzig was one of the very few Jews in Prussia to receive full citizenship privileges, as a "Useful Jew". He became extraordinarily wealthy as a consequence.

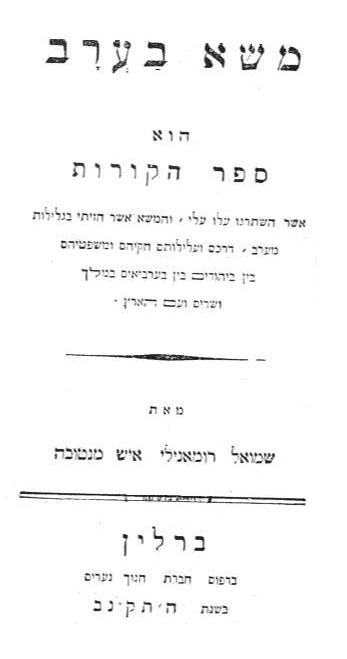
Book by Romineli commemorating Itzig in Berlin

Together with his son in law David Friedlander, Itzig was appointed to lead a committee which was to discuss ways to improve the Jewish civil and social standing in Prussia, which led to the removal of many restrictions. He funded early members of the Haskalah secular movement, including Rabbi Israel of Zamosch (Moses Mendelssohn's teacher), Samuel Rominow (an Italian Jewish artist) and Isaac Satanow.

In 1761 he began planning a school for poor Jewish boys in Berlin, and in 1778 his son together with Daniel Friedlander opened the first "free school" (Freischule) called "Hinuch Neorim", Hebrew: 'Teaching the Youth'. The school and adjacent printing house later became one of the main institutions of the Haskalah movement. At the same time he founded and funded a Yeshiva and brought Rabbi Hirschel Levin and Rabbi Joseph ben Meir Teomim to Berlin to teach there.

Itzig was the official head ('Oberältester') of the Jewish community in Berlin from 1764 until his death in 1799. He was made the Prussian court banker by Frederick's successor, Frederick William II of Prussia in 1797.

== Legacy ==
His wife Miriam Wulff's ancestors included Rabbi Moses Isserles of Kraków and Joseph ben Mordechai Gershon. Many of Itzig's thirteen children (see Itzig family) became influential in German Jewish society. Two of his granddaughters married two of Moses Mendelssohn's sons. One of them was Lea (née Solomon), mother of Felix Mendelssohn and Fanny Hensel, a pianist and composer. By her, Lea was grandmother of mathematician Kurt Hensel. A non-Jewish descendant of Daniel Itzig was Wilhelm Cauer.

== See also ==
- Itzig family

== Sources ==
- Conway, David (2012). Jewry in Music: Entry to the Profession from the Enlightentment to Richard Wagner. Cambridge: Cambridge University Press.
