= Strassmann =

Strassmann is a German surname. Notable people with the surname include:

- Antonie Strassmann, German stage actress and aviator
- Diana Strassmann, American economist
- Fritz Strassmann, German chemist
  - 19136 Strassmann asteroid
- Joan E. Strassmann Biologist
- Reinhold Strassmann, German mathematician
  - Strassmann's theorem
- Wolfgang Straßmann, German politician
