= Shai Haran =

Israeli mathematician and professor

- שי הרן
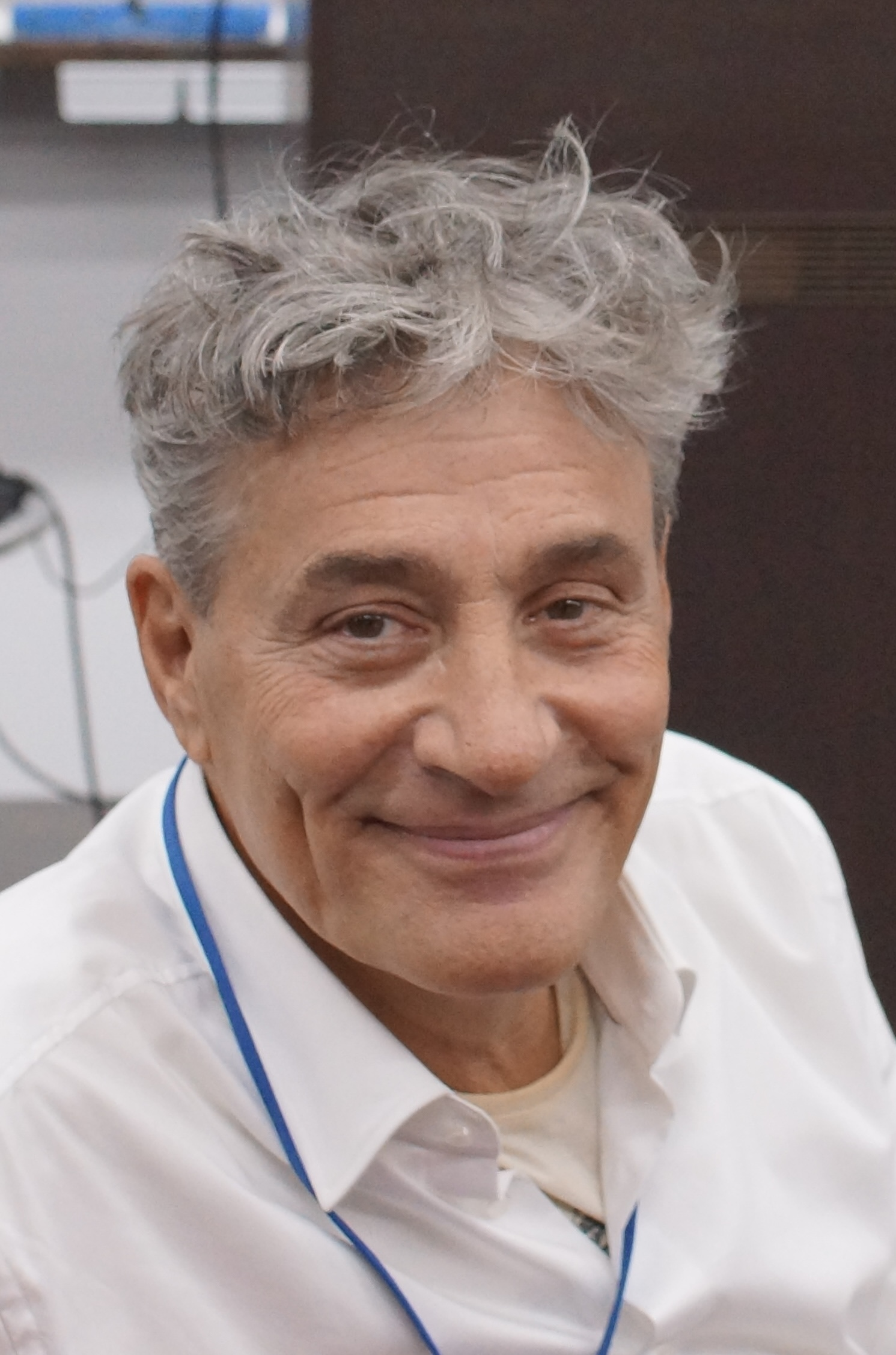
- Shai Haran in 2025
- Born: 1958 (age 67–68); Jerusalem
- Education: Massachusetts Institute of Technology (PhD)
- Scientific career
- Fields: Mathematics
- Workplaces: Technion – Israel Institute of Technology
- Thesis: p-Adic L-functions for Elliptic Curves over CM Fields (1983)
- Doctoral advisor: Michael Artin
- Other academic advisors: Barry Mazur; Daniel Quillen

Shai Haran (Hebrew: שי הרן; born 1958) is an Israeli mathematician and professor at the Technion – Israel Institute of Technology. He is known for his work in p-adic analysis, p-adic quantum mechanics, and non-additive geometry, including the field with one element, in relation to strategies for proving the Riemann hypothesis.

== Life ==
Born in Jerusalem on October 8, 1958, Haran graduated from the Hebrew University in 1979, and, in 1983, received his PhD in mathematics from the Massachusetts Institute of Technology (MIT) on "p-Adic L-functions for Elliptic Curves over CM Fields" under his advisor Barry Mazur from Harvard University, and his mentors Michael Artin and Daniel Quillen from MIT.

Haran is a professor at the Technion – Israel Institute of Technology. He was a frequent visitor at Stanford University, MIT, Harvard and Columbia University, the Institut des Hautes Études Scientifiques, Max-Planck Institute, Kyushu University and the Tokyo Institute of Technology, among other institutions.

== Work ==
His early work was in the construction of p-adic L-functions for modular forms on GL(2) over any number field. He gave a formula for the explicit sums of arithmetic functions expressing in a uniform way the contribution of a prime, finite or real, as the derivative at $\alpha=0$ of the Riesz potential of order $\alpha$. This formula is one of the inspirations for the non-commutative geometry approach to the Riemann Hypothesis of Alain Connes. He then developed potential theory and quantum mechanics over the p-adic numbers, and is currently an editor of the journal "p-Adic Numbers, Ultrametric Analysis and Applications" .

Haran also studied the tree structure of the p-adic integers within the real and complex numbers and showed that it is given by the theory of classic orthogonal polynomials. He constructed Markov chains over the p-adic, real, and complex numbers, giving finite approximations to the harmonic beta measure. In particular, he showed that there is a q-analogue theory that interpolates between the p-adic theory and the real and complex theory. With his students Uri Onn and Uri Badder, he developed the higher rank theory for GL(n).

His recent work is focused on the development of mathematical foundations for non-additive geometry, a geometric theory that is not based on commutative rings. In this theory, the field with one element $\mathbb{F}$ is defined as the category of finite sets with partial bijections, or equivalently, of finite pointed sets with maps that preserve the distinguished points. The non-additive geometry is then developed using two languages, $\mathbb{F}-\mathcal{R}\text{ings}$ and "generalized rings", to replace commutative rings in usual algebraic geometry. In this theory, it is possible to consider the compactification of the spectrum of $\mathbb{Z}$ and a model for the arithmetic plane that does not reduce to the diagonal $\mathbb{Z}$.

== Publications ==
=== Books ===
- Haran, Shai (2001). The Mysteries of the Real Prime. London Math. Soc. Oxford University Press. ISBN 0198508689.
- Haran, Shai (2008). Arithmetical Investigations: Representation Theory, Orthogonal Polynomials, and Quantum Interpolations. Lecture Notes in Mathematics 1941, Springer. ISBN 978-3540849216.
- Haran, Shai (2017). New foundations for geometry Two non-additive languages for arithmetical geometry. Memoirs of the American Mathematical Society, American Mathematical Society. ISBN 978-1-4704-2312-4.
- Haran, Shai (2025). Non Additive Geometry. World Scientific Publishing. ISBN 978-981-98-0668-3.

== See also ==
- p-adic analysis
- Field with one element
