= Composer =

Person who writes music

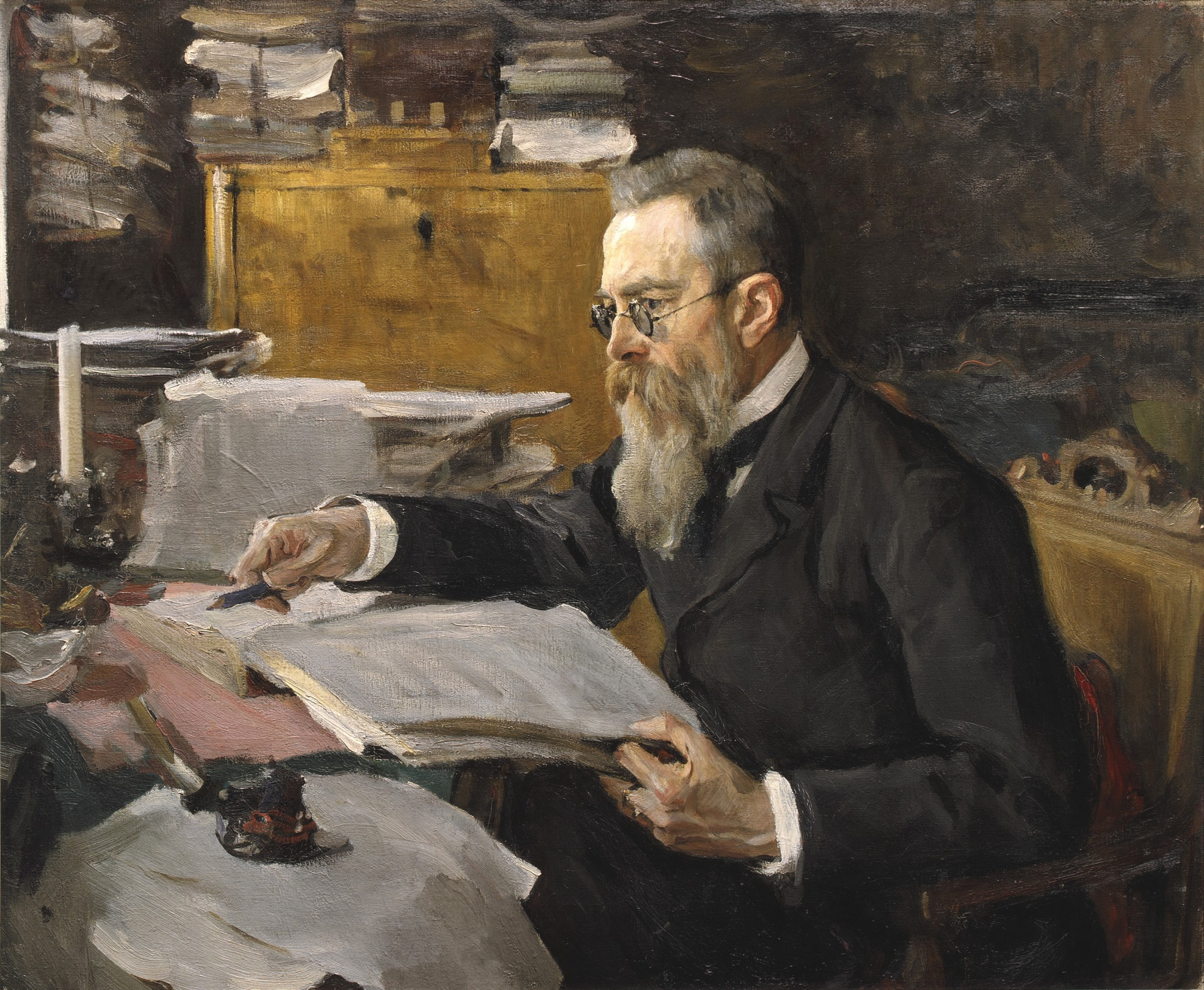
Portrait of Nikolai Rimsky-Korsakov composing at his desk, by Valentin Serov, 1898

A composer is a person who writes music. The term is used to indicate composers of Western classical music, or all those who are composers by occupation. Many composers are, or were, also skilled performers of music.

== Etymology and definition ==
The term is descended from Latin, compōnō; literally "one who puts together". The earliest use of the term in a musical context given by the Oxford English Dictionary is from Thomas Morley's 1597 A Plain and Easy Introduction to Practical Music, where he says "Some wil [sic] be good descanters [...] and yet wil be but bad composers".

"Composer" is a loose term that generally refers to any person who writes music. More specifically, it is often used to denote people who are composers by occupation, or those who work in the tradition of Western classical music. Writers of exclusively or primarily songs may be called composers, but since the 20th century the terms 'songwriter' or 'singer-songwriter' are more often used, particularly in popular music genres. In other contexts, the term 'composer' can refer to a literary writer, or more rarely and generally, someone who combines pieces into a whole.

Across cultures and traditions composers may write and transmit music in a variety of ways. In much popular music, the composer writes a composition, and it is then transmitted via oral tradition. Conversely, in some Western classical traditions music may be composed aurally—i.e. "in the mind of the musician"—and subsequently written and passed through written documents. In the Western world, before the Romantic period of the 19th century, composition almost always went side by side with a combination of either singing, instructing and theorizing.

== Role of women ==
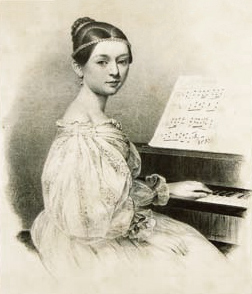
Nineteenth-century composer and pianist Clara Schumann

In 1993, American musicologist Marcia Citron asked, "Why is music composed by women so marginal to the standard 'classical' repertoire?" Citron "examines the practices and attitudes that have led to the exclusion of women composers from the received 'canon' of performed musical works." She argues that in the 1800s, women composers typically wrote art songs for performance in small recitals rather than symphonies intended for performance with an orchestra in a large hall, with the latter works being seen as the most important genre for composers; since women composers did not write many symphonies, they were deemed to be not notable as composers.

According to Abbey Philips, "women musicians have had a very difficult time breaking through and getting the credit they deserve." During the Medieval eras, most of the art music was created for liturgical (religious) purposes and due to the views about the roles of women that were held by religious leaders, few women composed this type of music, with the nun Hildegard von Bingen being among the exceptions. Most university textbooks on the history of music discuss almost exclusively the role of male composers. As well, very few works by women composers are part of the standard repertoire of classical music. In Concise Oxford History of Music, "Clara Shumann [sic] is one of the only female composers mentioned", but other notable women composers of the common practice period include Fanny Hensel and Cécile Chaminade, and arguably the most influential teacher of composers during the mid-20th century was Nadia Boulanger. Philips states that "[d]uring the 20th century the women who were composing/playing gained far less attention than their male counterparts."

Women today are being taken more seriously in the realm of concert music, though the statistics of recognition, prizes, employment, and overall opportunities are still biased toward men.

== Institutional training ==
Professional classical composers often have a background in performing classical music during their childhood and teens, either as a singer in a choir, as a player in a youth orchestra, or as a performer on a solo instrument (e.g., piano, pipe organ, or violin). Teens aspiring to be composers can continue their postsecondary studies in a variety of formal training settings, including colleges, conservatories, and universities. Conservatories, which are the standard musical training system in countries such as France and Canada, provide lessons and amateur orchestral and choral singing experience for composition students. Universities offer a range of composition programs, including bachelor's degrees, Master of Music degrees, and Doctor of Musical Arts degrees. As well, there are a variety of other training programs such as classical summer camps and festivals, which give students the opportunity to get coaching from composers.

=== Undergraduate ===
Bachelor's degrees in composition (referred to as B.Mus. or B.M) are four-year programs that include individual composition lessons, amateur orchestra/choral experience, and a sequence of courses in music history, music theory, and liberal arts courses (e.g., English literature), which give the student a more well-rounded education. Usually, composition students must complete significant pieces or songs before graduating. Not all composers hold a B.Mus. in composition; composers may also hold a B.Mus. in music performance or music theory.

=== Masters ===
Master of Music degrees (M.mus.) in composition consists of private lessons with a composition professor, ensemble experience, and graduate courses in music history and music theory, along with one or two concerts featuring the composition student's pieces. A master's degree in music (referred to as an M.Mus. or M.M.) is often a required minimum credential for people who wish to teach composition at a university or conservatory. A composer with an M.Mus. could be an adjunct professor or instructor at a university, but it would be difficult in the 2010s to obtain a tenure track professor position with this degree.

=== Doctoral ===
To become a tenure track professor, many universities require a doctoral degree. In composition, the key doctoral degree is the Doctor of Musical Arts, rather than the PhD; the PhD is awarded in music, but typically for subjects such as musicology and music theory.

Doctor of Musical Arts (referred to as D.M.A., DMA, D.Mus.A. or A.Mus.D) degrees in composition provide an opportunity for advanced study at the highest artistic and pedagogical level, requiring usually an additional 54+ credit hours beyond a master's degree (which is about 30+ credits beyond a bachelor's degree). For this reason, admission is highly selective. Students must submit examples of their compositions. If available, some schools will also accept video or audio recordings of performances of the student's pieces. Examinations in music history, music theory, ear training/dictation, and an entrance examination are required.

Students must prepare significant compositions under the guidance of faculty composition professors. Some schools require DMA composition students to present concerts of their works, which are typically performed by singers or musicians from the school. The completion of advanced coursework and a minimum B average are other typical requirements of a D.M.A program. During a D.M.A. program, a composition student may get experience teaching undergraduate music students.
