= Elocution =

Study of formal speaking in pronunciation, grammar, style, and tone

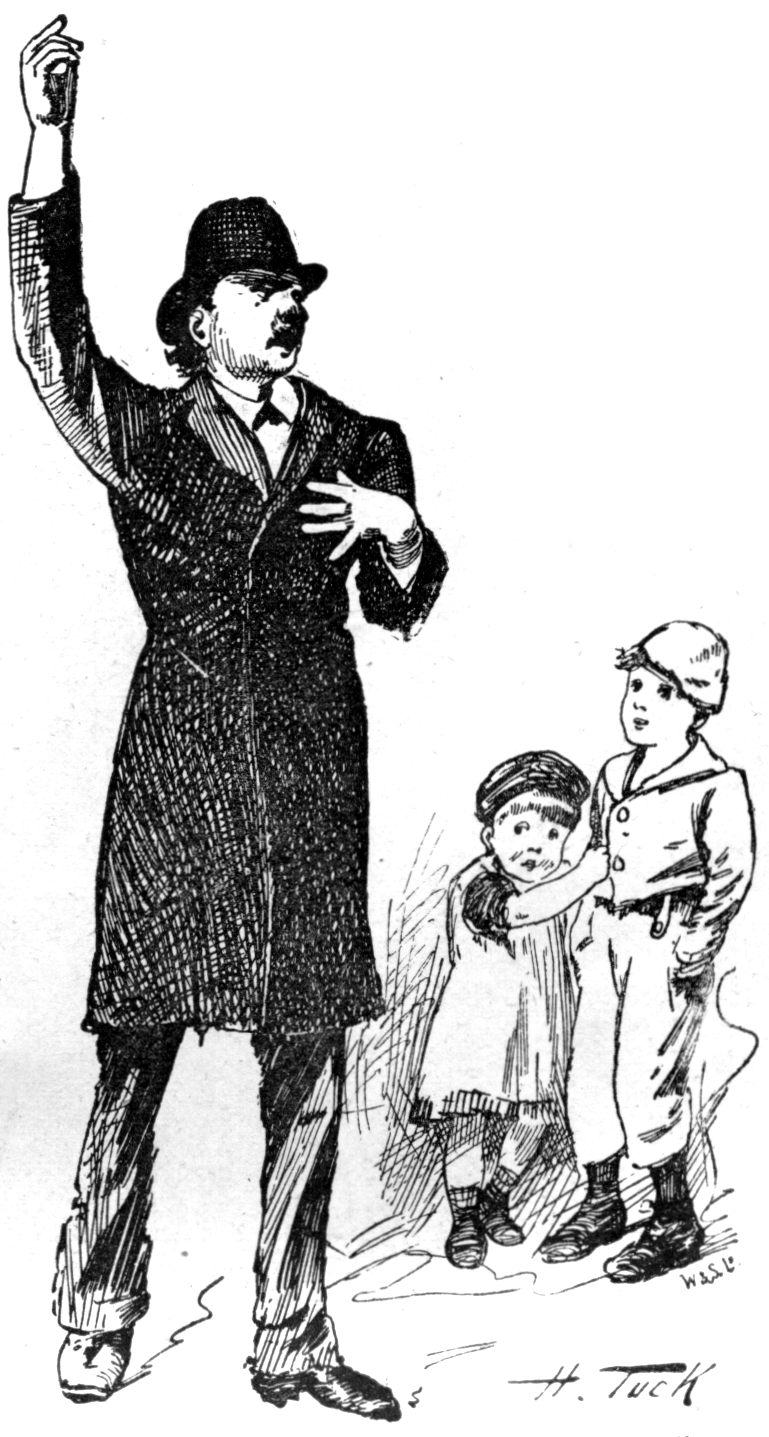
"An accomplished elocutionist", an illustration of elocutionist performing an open-air recitation, published in The Strand Magazine in 1891

Elocution is the study of formal speaking in pronunciation, grammar, style, and tone as well as the idea and practice of effective speech and its forms. It stems from the idea that while communication is symbolic, sounds are final and compelling.

Elocution emerged in England in the 18th and 19th centuries and in the United States during the 19th century. It benefited men and women in different ways; the overall concept was to teach both how to become better, more persuasive speakers and standardize errors in spoken and written English. The beginnings of the formulation of argument were also discussed.

== History ==
In Western classical rhetoric, elocution was one of the five core disciplines of pronunciation, which was the art of delivering speeches. Orators were trained not only on proper diction, but on the proper use of gestures, stance, and dress. There was a movement in the eighteenth century to standardize English writing and speaking and elocution was a part of this movement, with the help of Sheridan and Walker. (Another area of rhetoric, elocutio, was unrelated to elocution and, instead, concerned the style of writing proper to discourse.)

Elocution emerged as a formal discipline during the eighteenth century. One of its important figures was Thomas Sheridan, actor and father of Richard Brinsley Sheridan. Thomas Sheridan's lectures on elocution, collected in Lectures on Elocution (1762) and his Lectures on Reading (1775), provided directions for marking and reading aloud passages from literature. Another actor, John Walker, published his two-volume Elements of Elocution in 1781, which provided detailed instruction on voice control, gestures, pronunciation, and emphasis. Sheridan had a lot of ground to cover, being one of the first to establish standard ideas about this subject. He wrote vaguely on subjects and promised to explain them further, while Walker's approach was an attempt to put in place rules and a system for the correct form of elocution.

One reason these books gained traction was that both authors took a scientific approach and made rhetorically-built arguments in a time period where manual-styled, scientific, how-to books were popular. Included in these efforts were "over four hundred editions" of grammar and "two hundred fifteen editions" of dictionary books that became available to the public in the 1700s, "five times more ... after 1750" than prior. This shift was because education began to carry more weight in social status, so upper-class, highly educated people were reading these books as well as those who wanted to have the appearance of belonging to a higher class than they did.

With the publication of these works and similar ones, elocution gained wider public interest. While training on proper speaking had been an important part of private education for many centuries, the rise in the nineteenth century of a middle class in Western countries (and the corresponding rise of public education) led to great interest in the teaching of elocution, and it became a staple of the school curriculum. American students of elocution drew selections from what were popularly deemed "Speakers." By the end of the century, several Speaker texts circulated throughout the United States, including McGuffey's New Juvenile Speaker, the Manual of Elocution and Reading, the Star Speaker, and the popular Delsarte Speaker. Some of these texts even included pictorial depictions of body movements and gestures to augment written descriptions.

The era of the elocution movement, defined by the likes of Sheridan and Walker, evolved in the early and mid-1800s into what is called the scientific movement of elocution, defined in the early period by James Rush's The Philosophy of the Human Voice (1827) and Richard Whately's Elements of Rhetoric (1828), and in the later period by Alexander Melville Bell's A New Elucidation of Principles of Elocution (1849) and Visible Speech (1867).

Women were involved in elocution from the beginning of the movement. Elocution opened up opportunities for women in education and as a career, with women acting as both performers and educators in the subject. Elocution allowed women to expand their roles in society while both challenging and reinforcing gender roles. Women who wrote compilations of speeches for fellow elocutionists often chose speeches that helped to advance feminism and broaden women's roles by celebrating womanhood and featuring strong female characters. Other speeches reinforced women's roles in the home. Elocution was also beneficial in helping upper class women to strengthen their social roles in their communities. Despite women being heavily involved in the movement, scholarship focusing on women’s involvement has been relatively scarce until recently.

In 2017, Marian Wilson Kimber published a book focusing on the once-popular female dominated genre of elocution set to musical accompaniment.

In a 2020 article, "'The Artful Woman': Mrs. Ellis and the Domestication of Elocution," Don Paul Abbott writes about Sarah Stickney Ellis's work Young Ladies Reader (1845) and its impact on women's lives in the nineteenth century. Ellis' work, as well as others that were published around the same time, compiled other authors' works. Ellis had intended her work to be for other women; therefore she compiled a number of women's writings in her work, in keeping with the belief at the time that women and men lived in "separate spheres."

Ellis did not go the lengths that Sheridan and Walker did when it came to developing theories and rules for elocution. However, through her writing she made it clear that she believed that the spoken word was powerful and mastering it "deserves the attention" of ladies all around. She described the idea of "The Artful Woman," a lady who was able to persuade others, specifically her husband. According to Abbott, Ellis believed that she had empowered women in their own sphere. In his journal article, he argues that it is possible she delayed women stepping "from the parlor to the podium."

== Sample curriculum ==
An example can be seen in the table of contents of McGuffey's New Sixth Eclectic Reader of 1857:

Principles of Elocution

I. Articulation
II. Inflections
III. Accent and Emphasis
IV. Instructions for Reading Verse
V. The Voice
VI. Gesture

New Sixth Reader. Exercises in Articulation

Exercise I. — The Grotto of Antiparos
Exercise II. — The Thunder Storm
Exercise III. — Description of a Storm
IV. Hymn to the Night-Wind
V. — The Cataract of Lodore

On Inflection

VI. — Industry Necessary for the Orator
VII. — The Old House Clock [etc.]

== Modern elocution ==
Jason Munsell, a communications and speech professor, theorizes that part of elocution is strategic movement and visual aids, due to a major portion of communication occurring digitally. In his journal article from 2011, he argues that writings on elocution during the mid-nineteenth century aided women in becoming rhetorically empowered. Munsell, when examining a bulletin from the time period, makes an argument that elocution may have been the beginning of the concept of Literary theory: "The bulletin also explained that the function of elocution was to discover possible meanings of a reading, to learn how to express those meanings, then to discover the intended purpose."

== See also ==
- Diction
- Orthoepy
- Philology

=== Other forms ===
- Homiletics, Christian rhetoric
- Pronunciation, classical elocution
- Tajwid, Qur'anic elocution
