= Die Heimkehr aus der Fremde =

- Singspiel by Felix Mendelssohn
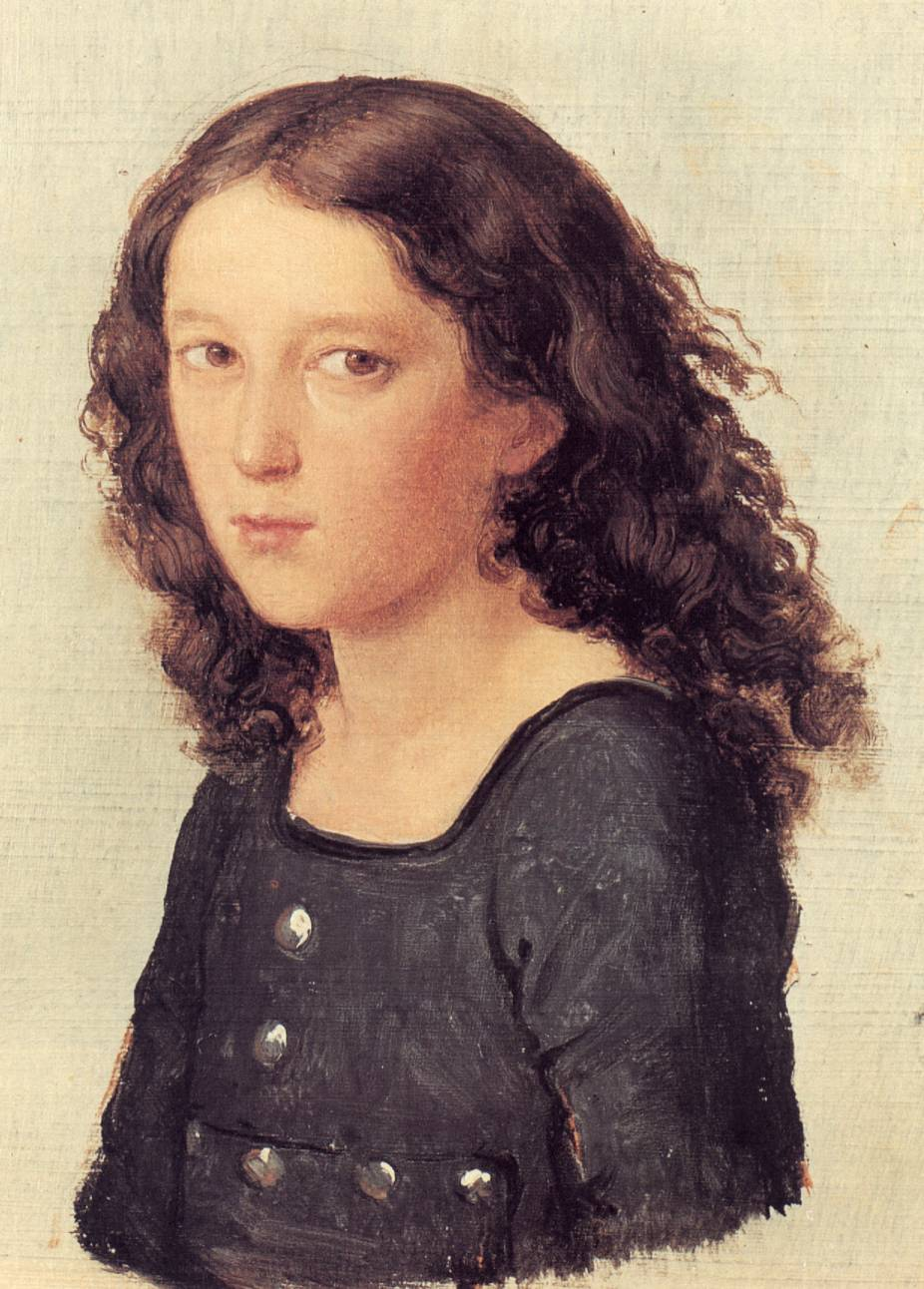
- The composer, who wrote the piece for a family performance, in 1821
- Translation: Son and Stranger
- Librettist: Karl Klingemann
- Language: German
- Premiere: 26 December 1829; Mendelssohn's home

Die Heimkehr aus der Fremde (German, The Return Home from Abroad), known in English as Son and Stranger or Return of the Roamer, is a one-act Singspiel written by Felix Mendelssohn in 1829 to a German libretto by the composer's friend Karl Klingemann, a poet who would later provide the text for the oratorio Elijah. The English title Son and Stranger originated with the translation by Mendelssohn's friend, the critic Henry Chorley, created for a London production of 1851 and still often used for the rare revivals in English-speaking countries. The work was published posthumously as Mendelssohn's Op. 89.

== Background ==
During his first visit to the British Isles in 1829, bad weather in August forced Mendelssohn to abandon a planned visit to Ireland and instead make an extended stay at the home of a new acquaintance, mining engineer and businessman John Taylor, near Mold, Wales. While there, Mendelssohn penned Die Heimkehr aus der Fremde as a short comic play with music for performance in honor of his parents' silver wedding anniversary upcoming in December. The first performance was at the Mendelssohn family home on 26 December 1829 before an audience of 120. As the composer considered the work a piece for a strictly private occasion, it was not published in his lifetime, despite his mother's urgings to the contrary, and no public performance took place until a production, four years after the composer's death, in Leipzig on 10 April 1851; the first performance in England was also in 1851, for which Chorley's translation was written.

Mendelssohn himself conducted the first, private production, and all the roles were assumed by family members or associates of the composer, only one of whom, tenor Eduard Mantius, was a professional singer. As a consequence, the score contains a musical peculiarity: the mayor's part comprises only a few bars of music, sung almost entirely on the single note F, because its creator, Mendelssohn's brother-in-law Wilhelm Hensel, had no ability as a singer.

== Reception ==
Die Heimkehr had great success before its original audience, not least because of the mirth ensuing when Hensel, even prompted by humming on all sides, proved unable to sing the single note F that made up his part of the score. Following the work's posthumous publication, it overture achieved some popularity in four-hands piano reductions, and Kauz's patter song (in English "I am a Roamer") became a favorite for display in concert and parlor alike. The song also sometimes served as a test piece at Eisteddfodau. Modern productions, however, are rare, although a concert version was produced in Boston in early 2009.

== Roles ==
Role	Voice type	Premiere cast, 26 December 1829 (Conductor: Felix Mendelssohn )
Schultz, mayor of the village	bass	Wilhelm Hensel
Hermann, his son	tenor	Eduard Mantius
Hermann's mother	mezzo-soprano	Fanny Mendelssohn
Lisbeth, Schultz's ward	soprano	Rebecka Mendelssohn
Kauz, a peddler impersonating Hermann	baritone	Eduard Devrient
Chorus: villagers

== Synopsis ==
Die Heimkehr comprises an overture, seven solo numbers in the form of strophic songs, a few ensembles, and a short finale. Its plot is a typical comic tale of concealed and mistaken identity, telling the story of how a charming imposter attempts to impersonate the long-absent son of the village mayor to win the hand of his ward, only to be frustrated when the true son returns in disguise.

The principals all make their entrances in short order. As the opera opens, village mayor Schultz regrets the absence of his son Hermann, fiancé of his ward Lisbeth but for many years away serving in the army. Hermann's mother then sings the opening number, a romance about a queen whose son became a hero despite her efforts to conceal him from the military disguised as a girl, and Lisbeth responds with a song revealing her longing for Hermann, whom she last saw when she was a child. Kauz, an itinerant peddler disguised as a night watchman, enters singing of his renown all across Europe and expressing intent to court Lisbeth. Hermann, whom no one has seen in some years, follows, disguised as a wandering musician; he sings a song in praise of soldiers as keepers of the peace. Lisbeth, recognizing his song as one that he sang in his youth, realizes his true identity almost immediately, but she respects his desire to remain incognito, and the parents mistake Kauz for Hermann and do their best to advance his cause. The two rivals interrupt each other's serenades during the succeeding night, the passage of which Mendelssohn depicts in an intermezzo, and the next morning Kauz impersonates Hermann at a gathering of the villagers to celebrate Schultz's fiftieth anniversary as mayor. Hermann makes an appearance, however, and with the truth revealed all ends happily.

== Recordings ==
A complete compact disc live recording of the opera is available on Hänssler Classic No. 98487, with Juliane Banse, Christian Gerhaher, the Gächinger Kantorei and the Stuttgart Radio Symphony Orchestra under Helmuth Rilling. Another complete recording is available on EMI from Electrola recordings, with Hanna Schwarz, Helen Donath, Peter Schreier, Dietrich Fischer-Dieskau, Benno Kusche and the Münchner Rundfunkorchester under Heinz Wallberg. The Electrola is notable in that it is quadraphonic.

The overture has appeared in various collections. During the 78 RPM era, "I Am a Roamer" appeared more than once, including both acoustic and electric recordings by Malcolm McEachern and an Edison diamond disc by Arthur Middleton.
