= Paul Hensel =

German philosopher (1860–1930)

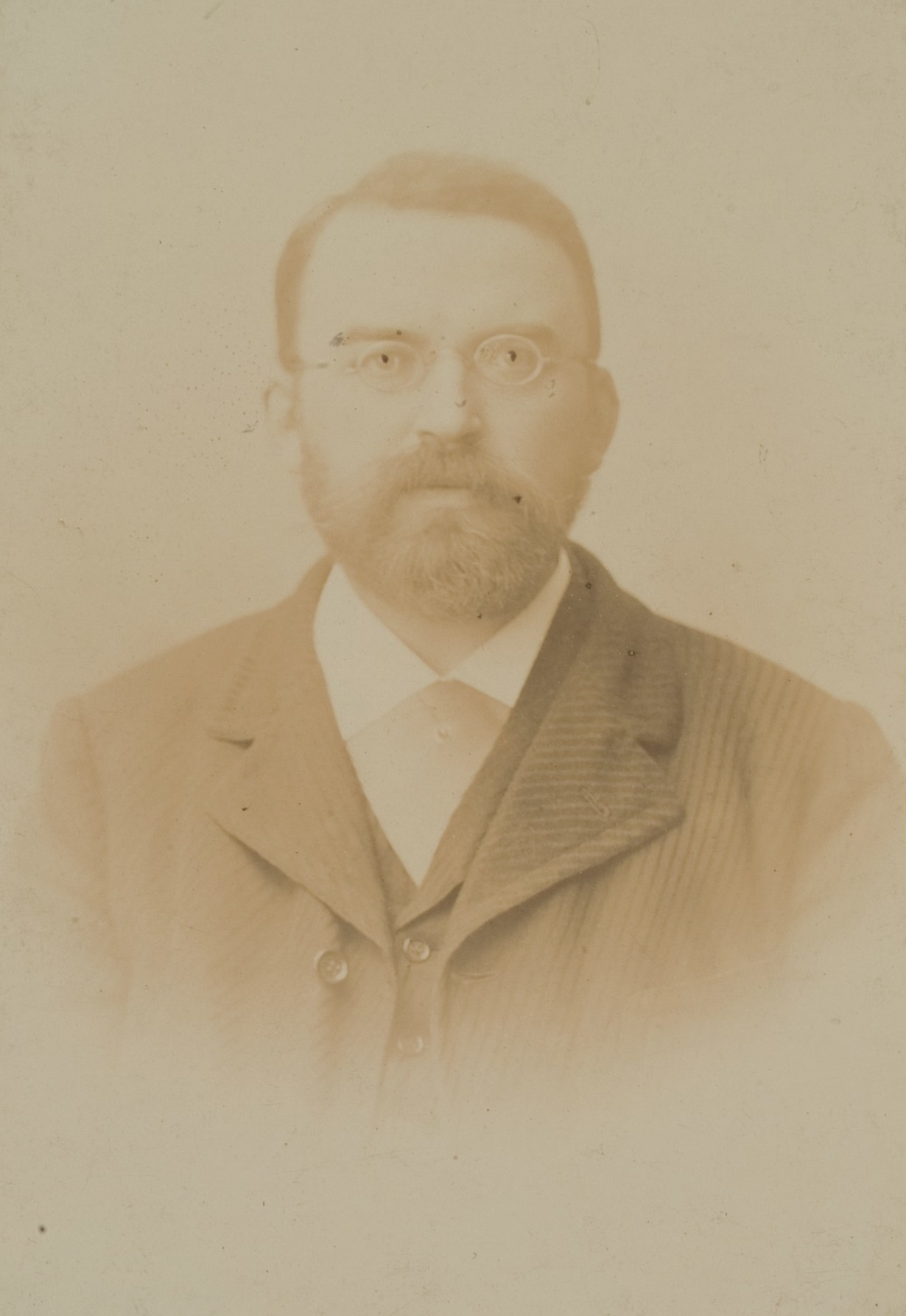
Hensel, c. 1900

Paul Hugo Wilhelm Hensel (German: [ˈhɛnzl̩]; 17 May 1860 – 11 November 1930) was a German philosopher.

== Biography ==
Hensel was born in Groß-Barten (now in Gvardeysky District) in the Province of Prussia. He was the son of the landowner and entrepreneur Sebastian Hensel, brother of the mathematician Kurt Hensel, and grandson of the composer Fanny Mendelssohn and the painter Wilhelm Hensel. Fanny was the sister of Felix Mendelssohn Bartholdy, daughter of Abraham Mendelssohn Bartholdy, and granddaughter of philosopher Moses Mendelssohn and entrepreneur Daniel Itzig. Both of Hensel's paternal grandmothers and his mother were from Jewish families that had converted to Christianity.

In 1885, Hansel earned his doctorate from Freiburg under Alois Riehl.

Hensel became a professor of philosophy at Heidelberg and Erlangen, where he taught until 1928. At Erlangen, Hensel was the supervisor of Hans Reichenbach's PhD dissertation on the theory of probability.

Paul Hensel's first marriage was to Käthe Rosenhayn (1861–1910) in 1896. The marriage produced their son Bruno Hensel (1899–1945). In 1917, Paul Hensel remarried to Elisabeth Nelson, née Schemmann (1884–1954), who also had a son in her first marriage and so brought him into her new marriage. She had two daughters with Paul Hensel: the pianist and music teacher Fanny Kistner-Hensel (1918–2006) and the historian Cécile Lowenthal-Hensel (1923–2012).

He died in Erlangen.

== Works ==
- Über die Beziehung des reinen Ich bei Fichte zur Einheit der Apperception bei Kant [On the relationship between Fichte's pure I and Kant's unity of apperception], 1885 (doctoral thesis under Alois Riehl)
- Ethisches Wissen und ethisches Handeln, 1889
- Hauptprobleme der Ethik, 1903
- Kleine Schriften und Vorträge, 1930
