= Sebastian Hensel =

German landowner (1830–1898)

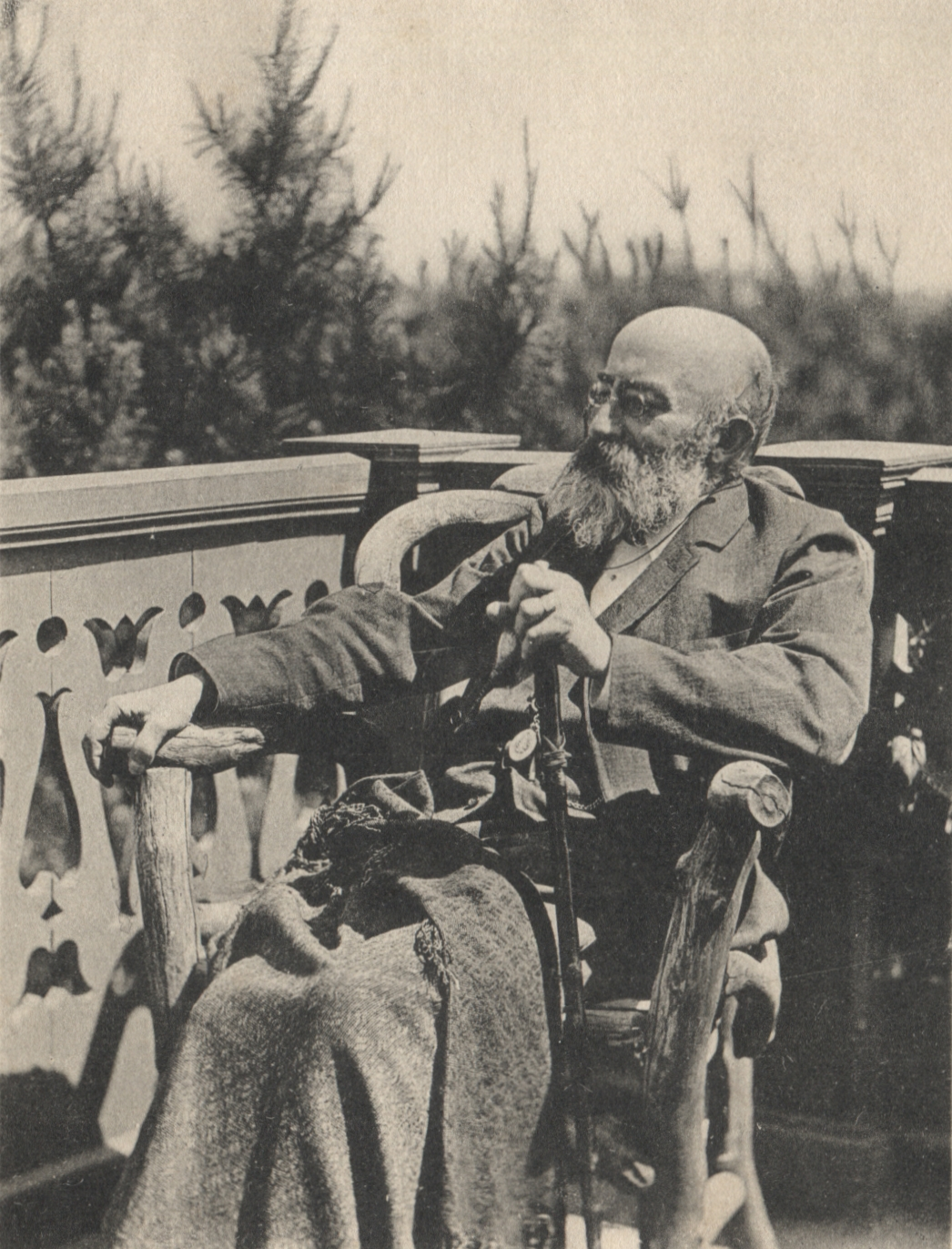
Sebastian Hensel (photograph of the 1890s)

Sebastian Ludwig Felix Hensel (June 16, 1830 – January 13, 1898) was a German landowner, entrepreneur and author.

== Life ==
Sebastian Hensel was born on June 16, 1830, the son of the pianist and composer Fanny Mendelssohn (1805–1847) and painter Wilhelm Hensel (1794–1861) in Berlin. The composer Felix Mendelssohn was his uncle, the philosopher Moses Mendelssohn his great-grandfather. Sebastian was the only surviving child of his parents. Three composers significant to the Hensels inspired his given names: Johann Sebastian Bach, Ludwig van Beethoven, and his uncle Felix.

As a birthday present for his first birthday, Sebastian was given a cantata for soprano, alto, four-part choir and orchestra from his mother. After graduating from the agricultural school in Hohenheim in 1852, he acquired a property in Groß Barthen near Königsberg in 1858. In the same year he married Julie von Adelson (1836–1901), a daughter of the Russian consul general in Königsberg. They had five children together: Fanny Römer, née Hensel (1857–1891), Cécile Leo, née Hensel (1858–1928), the philosopher Paul Hensel (1860–1930), the mathematician Kurt Hensel (1861–1941), and Lili du Bois-Reymond, née Hensel (1864–1948), writer.

The location of the estate in the lowlands of the river Pregel meant that the family suffered from fever attacks due to disease spread by insect bites, so Hensel decided to sell the estate. In Berlin, he accepted a position as director of a newly founded market hall company. The project to centralize and simplify Berlin's food supply failed after disputes with the authorities. For Hensel the problem lay in the "socialist view that everything should possibly be done by the state and the municipality". Shortly thereafter, he joined a construction company and a hotel company, which built the Grand Hotel Kaiserhof, which opened in 1875.

He compiled a history of the Mendelssohn family, based on their diaries and correspondence, which was published and translated.

Sebastian Hensel died in Berlin on January 13, 1898. He was buried with the Mendelssohn Bartholdy and Hensel families in the Dreifaltigkeit Cemetery in Berlin-Kreuzberg.
