= Jessie Forbes Cameron =

British mathematician

- Born: 8 January 1883; Stanley, Scotland
- Died: 27 March 1968 (aged 85); Southwold, England
- Other name: Jessie Forbes Thompson
- Education: University of Marburg
- Occupation: Mathematician
- Spouse: Edward Vincent Thompson
- Children: 3

Jessie Forbes Cameron (1883 – 1968) was a British mathematician who in 1912 became the first woman to complete her doctorate in mathematics at the University of Marburg in Germany.

== Life and work ==
Jessie Cameron was born on 8 January 1883 in Stanley, Scotland, one of eight children whose parents were James Cameron, a school principal at a village school in Perthshire, and his wife Jessie Forbes.

After attending the Perth Academy in Scotland, Jessie Cameron studied for four semesters at University of Edinburgh. From 1905 to 1908, she studied mathematics at Newnham College, which is part of University of Cambridge, in England, and earned a Magister degree (MA). There, she was ranked the tenth best in her class (earning her the distinction "10th Wrangler"), passed the "Mathematical Tripos" and graduated with a Bachelor of Arts (BA).

=== Postgraduate studies ===
Cameron moved to the University of Göttingen, in Germany, to take two more semesters of math, and finally, she enrolled at the University of Marburg, for three semesters. Under the supervision of distinguished mathematician Kurt Hensel, Cameron wrote her dissertation On the decomposition of a prime number in a composed body.

Before her degree was officially completed, however, there was one additional barrier for her to surmount. It seems she had completed the work and won the approval of her advisor, Dr. Hensel, without realizing a lesser-known caveat for graduation from a German university. According to Lorch-Göllner, she received the following letter from the university's Dean of Faculty of Philosophy on 10 November 1911.

"Although your doctoral thesis was judged favorably by the representatives of mathematics, especially by Privy Councilor Hensel, your admission to the rigorous examination is unfortunately subject to legal difficulties, which have to be fixed before I make an appointment. According to the regulations of our faculty's doctoral regulations, admission to a doctorate is dependent on proof that at least six semesters were studied at a university in the German Reich or a foreign university set up in the German way. The universities of Great Britain are not among the latter.

"You only studied five semesters at German universities and your ten semesters, which you have spent in Scotland and England, cannot be credited easily ... [you will need] a special dispensation from the Minister of Spiritual and Educational Affairs. ...

"I wrote to the Minister for this purpose eight days ago. It is hoped that he will give his approval, and then I would presumably be able to schedule the day of rigorosum before Christmas as you requested it."

She soon received the Minister's dispensation and passed her exams in "mathematics, physics and philosophy" on 20 December 1911, with the accolade magna cum laude. Thus, Cameron became the first female to earn a PhD in mathematics at that university and her dissertation was published in 1912.

On 28 September 1912 Cameron married the lawyer Edward Vincent Thompson, and she returned to Newnham College for a year beginning in 1912 as an "Assistant Lecturer." With this appointment, according to Lorch-Göllner, she was "the only [female] of the first math students after her doctorate - if even temporarily - to work as a mathematics lecturer in a scientific institution."

=== Later years ===
In 1913, the couple moved to London so Edward Thompson could pursue his career with a position at the British Treasury. Jessie Thompson gave birth to a daughter and two sons and continued her association with Newnham College until 1927. During the First World War, the Thompson family moved to Berkhamsted, England, where Jessie began working with the British National Council of Women.

Jessie Forbes (Cameron) Thompson died on 27 March 1968 in Southwold, England, at the age of 85.

== Published work ==
- Cameron, Jessie Forbes. Uber die Zerlegung einer Primzahl in einem komponierten Körper [On the decomposition of a prime number in a composite field]. University of Marburg, 1912.

== Literature ==
- Cameron, Jessie Forbes. In: Newnham College Register, Vol. 1, 1905, pages 184-185.
- Francesca M. Wilson: Jessie Forbes Thompson (born Cameron), 1883-1968 (Newnham 1905-1909 and 1912-1913). In: Newnham College Roll Letter, Cambridge 1969, pages 63–64.
