= Kurt Hensel =

German mathematician (1861–1941)

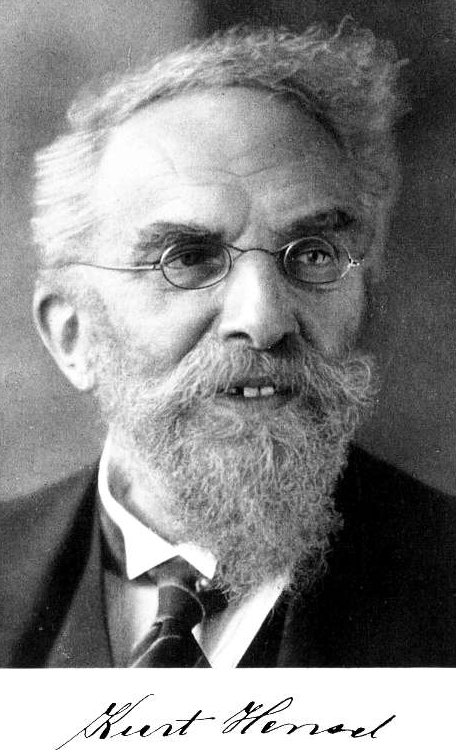
- Born: Kurt Wilhelm Sebastian Hensel; 29 December 1861; Königsberg, Prussia
- Died: 1 June 1941 (aged 79); Marburg, Germany
- Education: University of Bonn; University of Berlin
- Known for: p-adic number, Hensel's lemma
- Parent(s): Sebastian Hensel; Julia von Adelson
- Scientific career
- Fields: Mathematics
- Doctoral advisor: Leopold Kronecker
- Doctoral students: Jessie Forbes Cameron, Abraham Fraenkel, Helmut Hasse, Reinhold Strassmann

Kurt Wilhelm Sebastian Hensel (29 December 1861 – 1 June 1941) was a German mathematician born in Königsberg, best known for introducing the p-adic numbers.

== Life and career ==
Hensel was born in Königsberg, Province of Prussia (today Kaliningrad, Russia), the son of Julia (née von Adelson) and landowner and entrepreneur Sebastian Hensel. He was the brother of philosopher Paul Hensel. Kurt and Paul's paternal grandparents were painter Wilhelm Hensel and composer Fanny Hensel. Fanny was the sister of Felix Mendelssohn, daughter of Abraham Mendelssohn Bartholdy, and granddaughter of philosopher Moses Mendelssohn, and entrepreneur Daniel Itzig. Both of Hensel's grandmothers and his mother were from Jewish families that had converted to Christianity.

Hensel studied mathematics in Berlin and Bonn, under the mathematicians Leopold Kronecker and Karl Weierstrass.

Later in his life Hensel was a professor at the University of Marburg until 1930. He was also an editor of the mathematical Crelle's Journal. He edited the five-volume collected works of Leopold Kronecker.

Hensel is well known for his introduction of p-adic numbers. First described by him in 1897, they became increasingly important in number theory and other fields during the twentieth century.

Among his results is that known as Hensel's lemma, about polynomial factorization in modular arithmetic.

== Publications ==
- Theorie der algebraischen Funktionen einer Variabeln und ihre Anwendung auf algebraische Kurven und Abelsche Integrale (zus. mit Georg Landsberg) Teubner, Leipzig 1902
- Theorie der algebraischen Zahlen Teubner, Leipzig 1908
- Zahlentheorie Göschen, Berlin 1913
- Gedächtnisrede auf Ernst Eduard Kummer zu dessen 100. Geburtstag
- Über eine neue Begründung der Theorie der algebraischen Zahlen, Jahresbericht DMV, Band 6, 1899
