= Easter Sonata =

1828 piano sonata by Fanny Mendelssohn

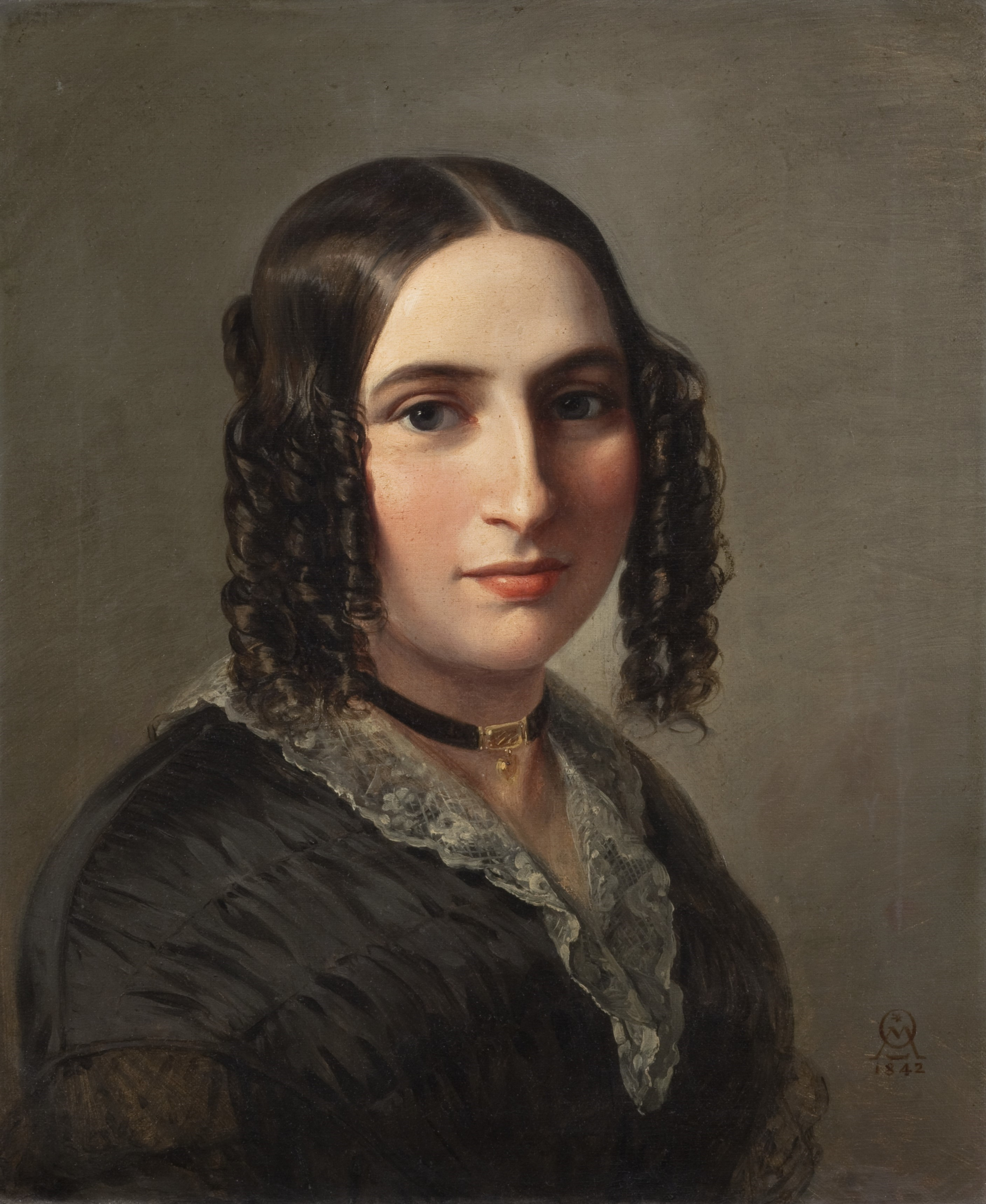
Fanny Hensel née Mendelssohn, 1842, by Moritz Daniel Oppenheim

The Easter Sonata (German: Ostersonate) is a piano sonata in the key of A major, composed by Fanny Hensel. It was lost for 150 years and when found attributed to her brother Felix, before finally being recognized as hers. It premiered in her name on 7 September 2012, played by Andrea Lam. It received a second performance by Sofya Gulyak on 8 March 2017 for BBC Radio 3. It was the second sonata composed by Fanny Mendelssohn and was completed in 1828.

During most of her lifetime, Fanny Mendelssohn's works remained unpublished. A few were published under her brother's name, with her knowledge and consent. The Easter Sonata was not published, but is mentioned as her work in her diary and letters written to her family members in 1829.

The manuscript, which is signed "F. Mendelssohn", was found in France in 1970 and the piece was recorded for the first time in 1972 by Éric Heidsieck, attributed to Felix Mendelssohn. Some musicologists suggested that the piece might be by Fanny Mendelssohn, but the proposal was not seriously considered by most because of the lack of a known autograph manuscript. In 2010 the manuscript was examined by Angela Mace Christian who verified that the manuscript was in Fanny Mendelssohn's handwriting and determined that it had been cut from her book of compositions.

In May 2020, the Easter Sonata was recorded under Fanny Mendelssohn's name for the first time by pianist Gaia Sokoli (Piano Classics, 2021).

The sonata depicts the Passion of Christ and the second movement contains an "ecclesiastical fugue". The Finale expresses the moment of Christ's death when the curtain of the Temple is rent asunder, and ends with a fantasy on the chorale tune "Christe, du Lamm Gottes" ("Christ, thou Lamb of God").

== Structure ==
The sonata contains four movements:

1. Allegro assai moderato
2. Largo e molto espresso – Poco più mosso
3. Scherzo: Allegretto
4. Allegro con strepito
