= P-adic exponential function =

Mathematical function

In mathematics, particularly p-adic analysis, the p-adic exponential function is a p-adic analogue of the usual exponential function on the complex numbers. As in the complex case, it has an inverse function, named the p-adic logarithm.

== Definition ==
The usual exponential function on $\mathbb{C}$ is defined by the infinite series

$$\exp(z)=\sum_{n=0}^\infty \frac{z^n}{n!}.$$

Entirely analogously, one defines the exponential function on $\mathbb{C}_p$, the completion of the algebraic closure of $\mathbb{Q}_p$, by

$$\exp_p(z)=\sum_{n=0}^\infty\frac{z^n}{n!}.$$

However, unlike exp which converges on all of $\mathbb{C}$, $\exp_p$ only converges on the disc

$$|z|_p<p^{-1/(p-1)}.$$

This is because p-adic series converge if and only if the summands tend to zero, and since the $n!$ in the denominator of each summand tends to make them large p-adically, a small value of z is needed in the numerator. It follows from Legendre's formula that if $|z|_p < p^{-1/(p-1)}$ then $\frac{z^n}{n!}$ tends to $0$, p-adically.

Although the p-adic exponential is sometimes denoted $e^x$, the number e itself has no p-adic analogue. This is because the power series $\exp_p(x)$ does not converge at $x=1$. It is possible to choose a number $e$ to be a p-th root of $\exp_p(p)$ for $p\neq 2$, (Note: or a 4th root of exp_{2}(4), for p = 2) but there are multiple such roots and there is no canonical choice among them.

== p-adic logarithm function ==
The power series

$$\log_p(1+x)=\sum_{n=1}^\infty \frac{(-1)^{n+1}x^n}{n},$$

converges for $x$ in $\mathbb{C}_p$ satisfying $|x|_p<1$ and so defines the p-adic logarithm function $\log_p(z)$ for $|z-1|_p<1$ satisfying the usual property $\log_p(zw)=\log_p(z)+\log_p(w)$. The function $\log_p$ can be extended to all of $\mathbb{C}$×
p (the set of nonzero elements of $\mathbb{C}_p$) by imposing that it continues to satisfy this last property and setting $\log_p(p)=0$. Specifically, every element $w$ of $\mathbb{C}$×
p can be written as $w=p^r\cdot\zeta\cdot z$ with $r$ a rational number, $\zeta$ a root of unity, and $|z-1|_p<1$, in which case $\log_p(w)=\log_p(z)$. (Note: In factoring w as above, there is a choice of a root involved in writing p^{r} since r is rational; however, different choices differ only by multiplication by a root of unity, which gets absorbed into the factor ζ.) This function on $\mathbb{C}$×
p is sometimes called the Iwasawa logarithm to emphasize the choice of $\log_p(p)=0$. In fact, there is an extension of the logarithm from $|z-1|_p<1$ to all of $\mathbb{C}$×
p for each choice of $\log_p(p)$ in $\mathbb{C}_p$.

== Properties ==
If $z$ and $w$ are both in the radius of convergence for $\exp_p$, then their sum is too and we have the usual addition formula: $\exp_p(z+w)=\exp_p(z)\exp_p(w)$.

Similarly if $z$ and $w$ are nonzero elements of $\mathbb{C}_p$ then $\log_p(zw)=\log_p(z)+\log_p(w)$.

For $z$ in the domain of $\exp_p$, we have $\exp_p(\log_p(1+z))=1+z$ and $\log_p(\exp_p(z))=z$.

The roots of the Iwasawa logarithm $\log_p(z)$ are exactly the elements of $\mathbb{C}_p$ of the form $p^r\cdot\zeta$ where $r$ is a rational number and $\zeta$ is a root of unity.

Note that there is no analogue in $\mathbb{C}_p$ of Euler's identity, $e^{2\pi i}=1$. This is a corollary of Strassmann's theorem.

Another major difference to the situation in $\mathbb{C}$ is that the domain of convergence of $\exp_p$ is much smaller than that of $\log_p$. A modified exponential function — the Artin–Hasse exponential — can be used instead which converges on $|z|_p<1$.
