= Wilhelm Hensel =

German painter (1794–1861)

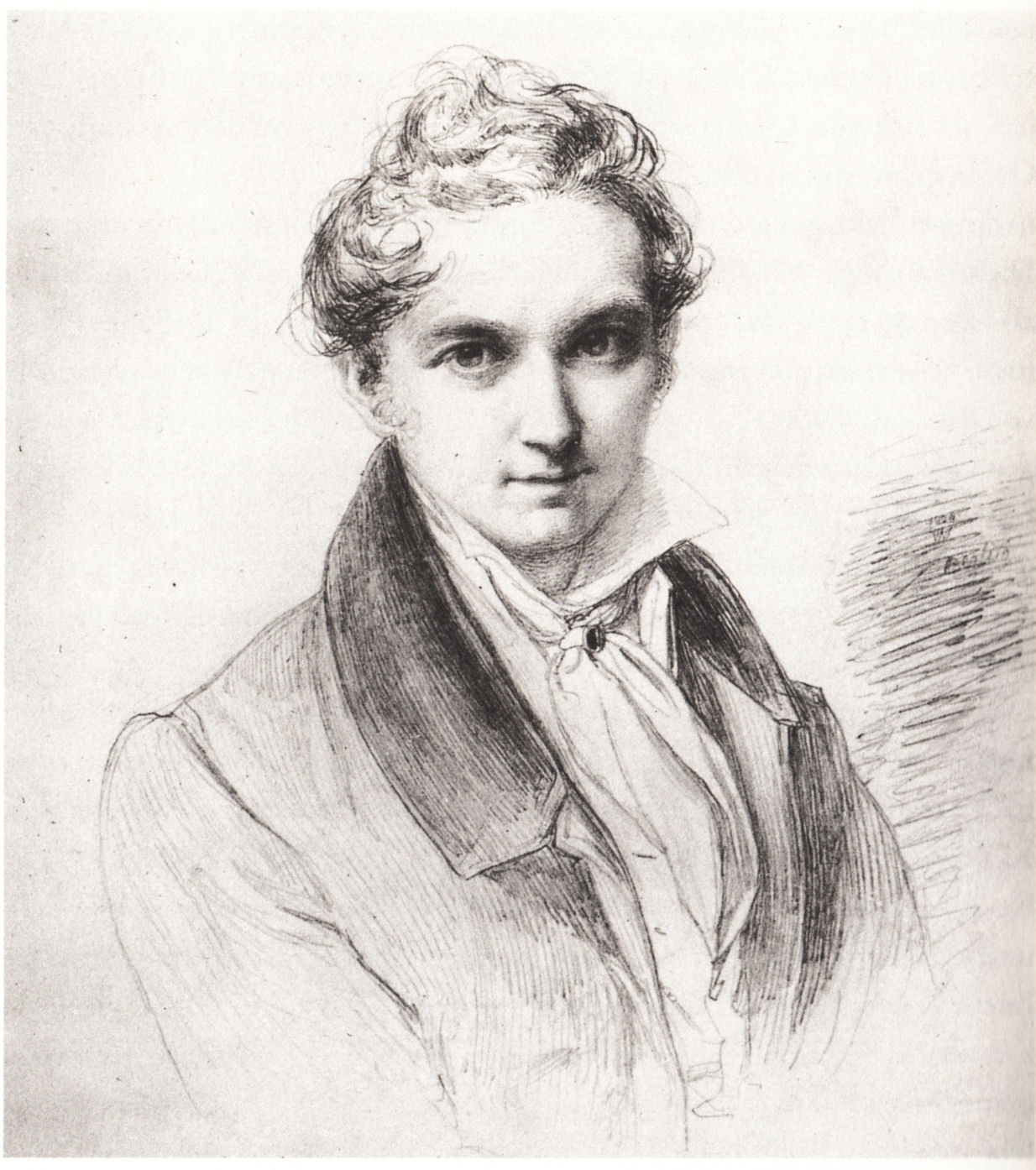
Self-portrait (1829)

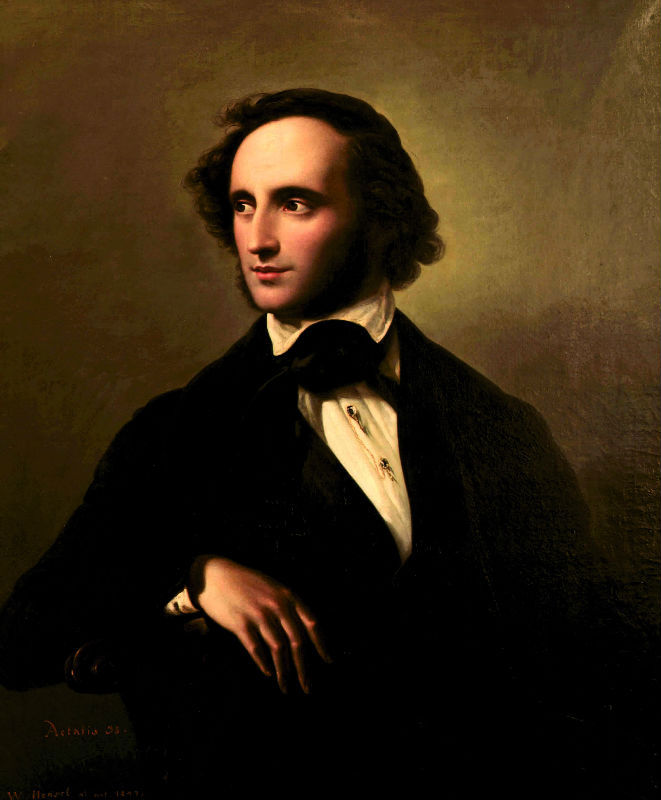
Portrait of Felix Mendelssohn (1847)

Wilhelm Hensel (6 July 1794 – 26 November 1861) was a German painter, brother of Luise Hensel, husband to Fanny née Mendelssohn, and brother-in-law to Felix Mendelssohn.

== Life and career ==
Wilhelm Hensel was born on 6 July 1794 in the German town of Trebbin, in the present-day state of Brandenburg, to a Protestant preacher. He was a pupil at the royal school of architecture, but soon discovered his true passion, painting. His studies were interrupted when he joined the military. Through this, he took advantage of two deployments in Paris to learn painting techniques. However, he experimented with writing and poetry, and enjoyed enough success that he once considered giving up painting.

Because many of Hensel's family members were famous themselves, and perhaps sacrificing his development as a painter, Hensel painted or drew portraits almost exclusively, although he produced some drawings for almanacs, and produced artwork found in some of the halls of the Schauspielhaus, an important theater in Berlin. In 1825 he went, with the support of the king, to Italy, where he was employed in painting copies of some of Raphael's works.

In 1828, Hensel moved back to Berlin, where he became the royal court painter, and both a professor and member of the Academic Senate. He married Fanny Mendelssohn; they had known each other since he was a student and she was 16. His activities as an artist were interrupted in 1848, when revolutions broke out all over Germany, and Hensel became an avid advocate of the conservative political parties of the time. Afterwards, he settled back into being an artist, and died on 26 November 1861 in Berlin. The German author Theodor Fontane memorialized Hensel in the last chapter of his work Wanderungen durch die Mark Brandenburg (Walks through the March of Brandenburg). Among his best-known works are Christus in der Wüste (Christ in the Desert), Kaiser Wenzel, Italienische Landleute am antiken Brunnen (Italian Peasants by an Ancient Fountain), and over 1000 drawings of well-known people of the German romantic period.

His wife, Fanny Mendelssohn, and his brother-in-law, Felix Mendelssohn, were both important pianists and composers, but Hensel himself apparently was entirely unmusical: when he participated in the premiere of Felix's Son and Stranger at a private performance honoring the silver anniversary of the Mendelssohn parents in 1826, despite determined prompting he was unable to sing his part of the mayor, even though it comprised only a few bars of the single note F.

Hensel's sister, Luise Hensel, was a widely read religious poet.

He and Fanny Mendelssohn had one child, Sebastian Ludwig Felix Hensel (1830–1898). Hensel's grandchildren include the philosopher Paul Hensel (1860–1930) and the mathematician Kurt Hensel (1861–1941).

== Gallery ==
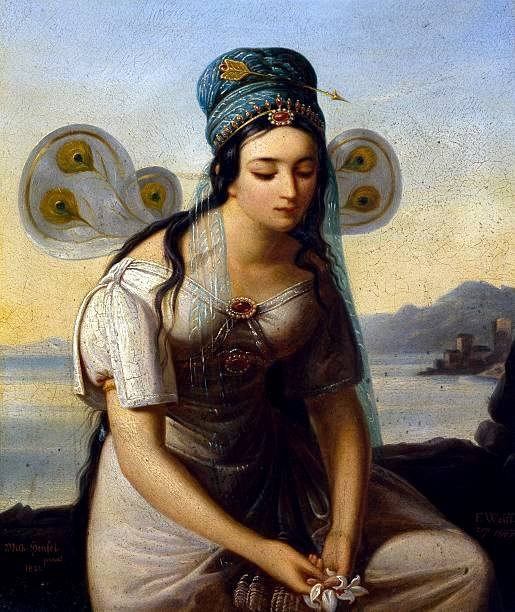
Portrait of Princess Elisa Radziwiłł (1803-1834) dressed as the Goddess Peri, inspired by the oratorio Paradise and the Peri, by Robert Schumann (1810-1856)

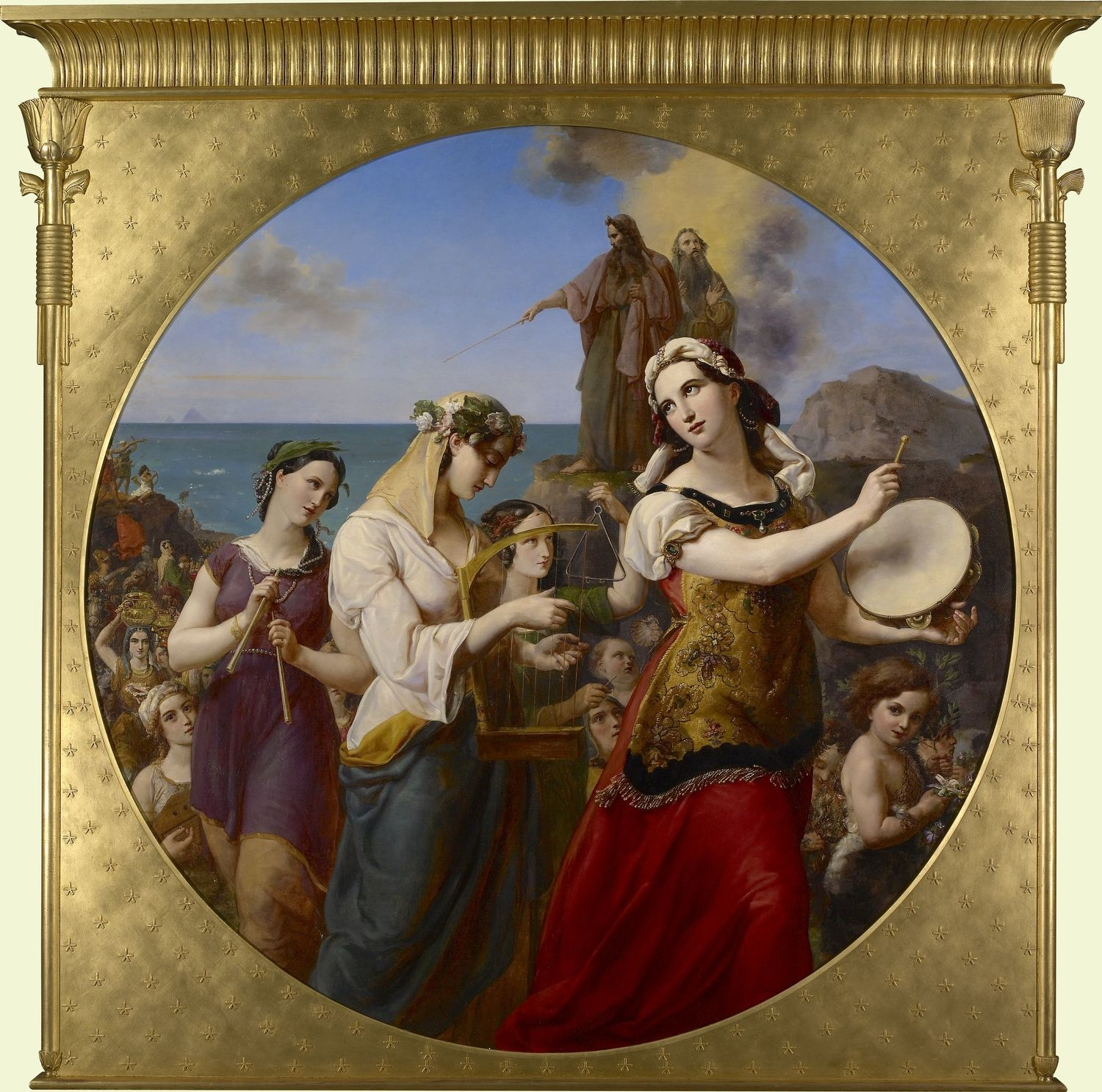
Miriam's Song of Praise, 1836
