= Strassmann's theorem =

Result in field theory about zeros of formal power series

In mathematics, Strassmann's theorem is a result in field theory. It states that, for suitable fields, suitable formal power series with coefficients in the valuation ring of the field have only finitely many zeroes.

== History ==
It was introduced by Reinhold Strassman.

== Statement of the theorem ==
Let $K$ be a field with a non-Archimedean absolute value $|\cdot|$ and let $R$ be the valuation ring of $K$. Let $f(x) = a_0 + a_1 x + a_2 x^2 + \dots$ be a formal power series which is not identically zero, with coefficients $a_n \in R$ converging to zero with respect to $|\cdot|$. Then $f(x)$ has only finitely many zeroes in $R$. More precisely, the number of zeros is at most $N$, where $N$ is the largest index with $|a_N| = \max_{n \geq 0} |a_n|$.

== Applications ==
A corollary of the theorem is that there is no analogue of Euler's identity, $e^{2 \pi i} = 1$ in $\mathbb{C}_p$, the field of p-adic complex numbers.

Strassman's theorem may also be used to prove the Skolem-Mahler-Lech theorem, which states that the set of indices at which a linear recurrence sequence is equal to zero is composed of a union of finitely many arithmetic progressions and a finite set.

== Related results ==
The Weierstrass preparation theorem over complete local rings generalises Strassman's theorem. While Strassman's theorem states that $f(x)$ has at most $N$ zeros in $R$, a corollary of the Weierstrass preparation theorem is that $f(x)$ has exactly $N$ zeros in the valuation ring of the algebraic closure of $K$.

== See also ==
- p-adic exponential function
