= P-adic quantum mechanics =

Research program

p-adic quantum mechanics is a collection of related research efforts in quantum physics that replace real numbers with p-adic numbers. Historically, this research was inspired by the discovery that the Veneziano amplitude of the open bosonic string, which is calculated using an integral over the real numbers, can be generalized to the p-adic numbers. This observation initiated the study of p-adic string theory. Another approach considers particles in a p-adic potential well, with the goal of finding solutions with smoothly varying complex-valued wave functions. Alternatively, one can consider particles in p-adic potential wells and seek p-adic valued wave functions, in which case the problem of the probabilistic interpretation of the p-adic valued wave function arises. As there does not exist a suitable p-adic Schrödinger equation, path integrals are employed instead. Some one-dimensional systems have been studied by means of the path integral formulation, including the free particle, the particle in a constant field, and the harmonic oscillator.

== See also ==
- p-adic analysis
