= Marcia Citron =

American musicologist

Marcia Judith Citron (born 1945) is an American professor of musicology at Rice University in Houston, Texas. She is a leading musicologist specializing in issues regarding women and gender, opera and film.

== Life and career ==
Marcia Citron graduated from Brooklyn College with a BA in 1966 and from University of North Carolina at Chapel Hill with an MA in 1968 and a PhD in 1971. She has been recognized with the Martha and Henry Malcolm Lovett Distinguished Service Professor of Musicology award, and has received grants from National Endowment for the Humanities, the German Academic and Exchange Service and Rice University. She is a member of the American Musicological Society and has served as committee chair.

== Works ==
Selected book publications include:

- Letters of Fanny Hensel to Felix Mendelssohn
- Cécile Chaminade: A Bio-Bibliography
- Gender and the Musical Canon
- Opera on Screen

She has also published numerous articles dealing with music history and analysis.
