= Marian Wilson Kimber =

American musicologist

- Born: Marian Wilson

Academic background
- Education: Florida State University (PhD)
- Thesis: Felix Mendelssohn's Works for Solo Piano and Orchestra: Sources and Composition (1993)
- Doctoral advisor: Douglass Seaton

Academic work
- Discipline: Musicologist
- Institutions: University of Iowa
- Main interests: 19th-century music, women in music

Marian Wilson Kimber is an American musicologist and a Professor of Music at the University of Iowa.

== Life and career ==
Having completed a dissertation on the autograph scores of Felix Mendelssohn's piano concertos, Wilson Kimber received her PhD in Musicology from Florida State University in 1993. Her work covers topics of gender, biography, performance, and bibliography in the nineteenth century. Specifically, she has published on Felix Mendelssohn and his sister Fanny Hensel, Jane Austen, spoken-word recitation to musical accompaniment, and female performance genres. Wilson Kimber's recent book The Elocutionists: Women, Music, and the Spoken Word (University of Illinois Press, 2017), was a recipient of grants from both the American Musicological Society and the Society for American Music.

== Selected writings ==
- Wilson Kimber, Marian (2017). The Elocutionists: Women, Music, and the Spoken Word. Champaign: University of Illinois Press.
- —— (2024). "National League of American Pen Women". Grove Music Online. Oxford: Oxford University Press. doi:10.1093/omo/9781561592630.013.90000382072. ISBN 978-1-56159-263-0. (subscription, Wikilibrary access, or UK public library membership required)
