= Reinhold Strassmann =

- Born: 1893; Berlin, German Empire
- Died: 1944 (aged 50–51); Auschwitz-Birkenau, German-occupied Poland
- Education: University of Marburg
- Known for: Strassmann's theorem
- Scientific career
- Fields: Mathematics
- Doctoral advisor: Kurt Hensel

Reinhold Strassmann (or Straßmann) (24 January 1893 in Berlin – late October 1944 in Auschwitz concentration camp) was a German mathematician who proved Strassmann's theorem. His Ph.D. advisor at University of Marburg was Kurt Hensel.

Born into a Jewish family, Strassmann refused to leave Nazi Germany, and he was eventually detained and deported to Theresienstadt concentration camp in 1943. On October 23, 1944, he was deported from Theresienstadt to Auschwitz concentration camp, where he was murdered soon after.

He was the son of the forensic pathologist Fritz Strassmann.

== Selected publications ==
- Straßmann, Reinhold (1928), "Über den Wertevorrat von Potenzreihen im Gebiet der p-adischen Zahlen (On the codomain of power series in the area of p-adic numbers)", Journal für die reine und angewandte Mathematik (in German), 159: 13–28, doi:10.1515/crll.1928.159.13, ISSN 0075-4102, JFM 54.0162.06, S2CID 117410014
