= Fanny Hensel =

German pianist and composer (1805–1847)

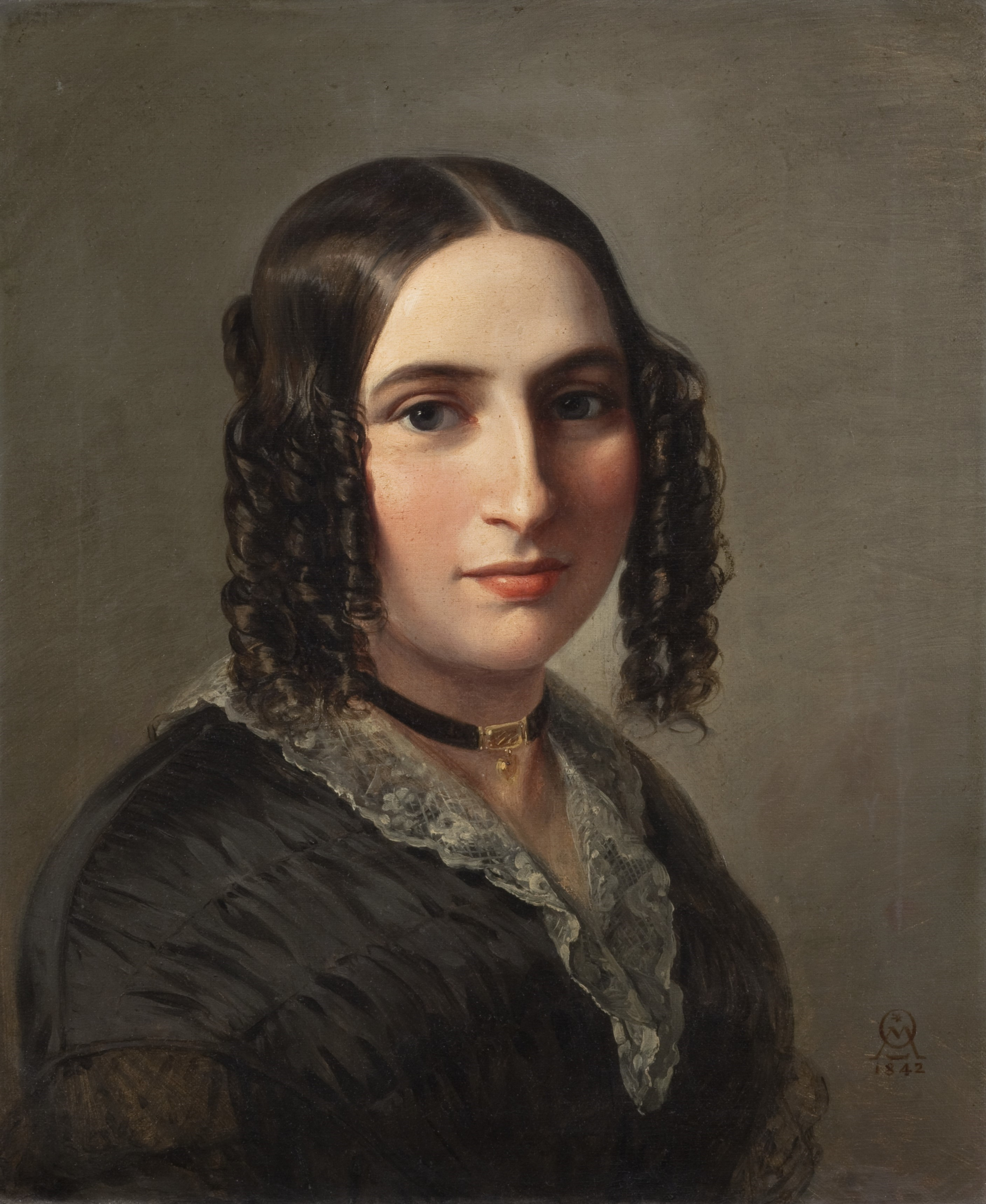
- Hensel, 1842
- Born: Fanny Cäcilie Mendelssohn; 14 November 1805; Hamburg
- Died: 14 May 1847 (aged 41); Berlin
- Occupations: Composer; Pianist
- Works: List of compositions
- Family: Mendelssohn family

Fanny Cäcilie Hensel née Mendelssohn (Note: /ˈmɛndəlsən, -soʊn/ MEN-dəl-sən, -sohn; German: [ˈmɛndl̩szoːn]) (14 November 1805 – 14 May 1847) was a German composer and pianist of the early Romantic era, also known as Fanny Mendelssohn Bartholdy. Her compositions number over 450, and include a string quartet, a piano trio, a piano quartet, an orchestral overture, four cantatas, more than 125 pieces for solo piano, and over 250 lieder. Most of these were unpublished in her lifetime. Although lauded for her piano technique, she rarely gave public performances outside her family circle.

She grew up in Berlin and received a thorough musical education from teachers including her mother, as well as the composers Ludwig Berger and Carl Friedrich Zelter. Her younger brother Felix Mendelssohn, also a composer and pianist, shared the same education and the two developed a close relationship. Owing to her family's reservations and to social conventions of the time about the roles of women, six of her songs were published under her brother's name in his Opus 8 and 9 collections. In 1829, she married artist Wilhelm Hensel and, in 1830, they had their only child, Sebastian Hensel. In 1846, despite the continuing ambivalence of some of her family (but not her husband) toward her musical ambitions, Fanny Hensel published a collection of songs as her Opus 1. She died of a stroke in 1847, aged 41.

Since the 1990s, her life and works have been the subject of more detailed research. Her Easter Sonata was inaccurately credited to her brother in 1970, before new analysis of documents in 2010 corrected the attribution. The Fanny & Felix Mendelssohn Museum opened on 29 May 2018 in Hamburg, Germany.

== Early life and education ==
Fanny Mendelssohn was born in Hamburg, the oldest of four children, including her brother Felix Mendelssohn born four years after her. She was descended on both sides from distinguished Jewish families; her parents were Abraham Mendelssohn (who was the son of the philosopher Moses Mendelssohn), and Lea Salomon, a granddaughter of the entrepreneur Daniel Itzig. She was baptised as a Christian in 1816, becoming Fanny Cäcilie Mendelssohn Bartholdy. Despite this, she and her family continued an affinity with the social and moral values of Judaism. She objected strongly when their father Abraham changed the family surname to "Mendelssohn Bartholdy" with the intention of playing down their Jewish origins: she wrote to her brother Felix of "Bartholdy, that name which we all dislike."

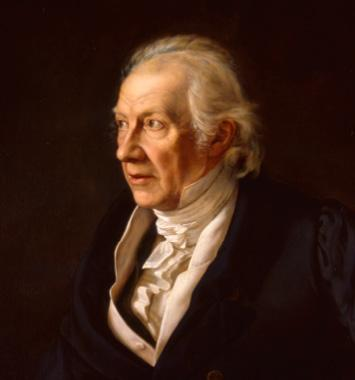
Carl Friedrich Zelter – portrait by Carl Begas (1827)

While growing up in the family's new home in Berlin, Mendelssohn showed prodigious musical ability and began to write music. She received her first piano instruction from her mother, who may have learned the Berlin Bach tradition through the writings of Johann Kirnberger, a student of Johann Sebastian Bach. Thus as a 14 year old, Mendelssohn could already play all 24 preludes from Bach's The Well-Tempered Clavier from memory alone, and she did so in honour of her father's birthday in 1819. Beyond inspiration from her mother, Mendelssohn may also have been influenced by the role-models represented by her great-aunts Fanny von Arnstein and Sarah Levy, both lovers of music—the former the patroness of a well-known salon and the latter a skilled keyboard player.

After studying briefly with the pianist Marie Bigot in Paris, Mendelssohn and her brother Felix received piano lessons from Ludwig Berger and composition instruction from Carl Friedrich Zelter. At one point, Zelter favoured Fanny over Felix: he wrote to Johann Wolfgang von Goethe in 1816, in a letter introducing Abraham Mendelssohn to the poet, "He has adorable children and his oldest daughter could give you something of Sebastian Bach. This child is really something special." (Note: In 1827 Goethe wrote a poem dedicated to Fanny, "Wenn ich mir in stiller Seele" (When in my quiet soul), which Fanny set as a lied in 1828.) Both Mendelssohn and her brother Felix received instruction in composition from Zelter starting in 1819. In October 1820, they joined the Sing-Akademie zu Berlin, which was then being led by Zelter. Much later, in an 1831 letter to Goethe, Zelter described Fanny's skill as a pianist with the highest praise for a woman at the time: "... she plays like a man." Visitors to the Mendelssohn household in the early 1820s, including Ignaz Moscheles and Sir George Smart, were equally impressed by both siblings.

== Gender and class limitations ==
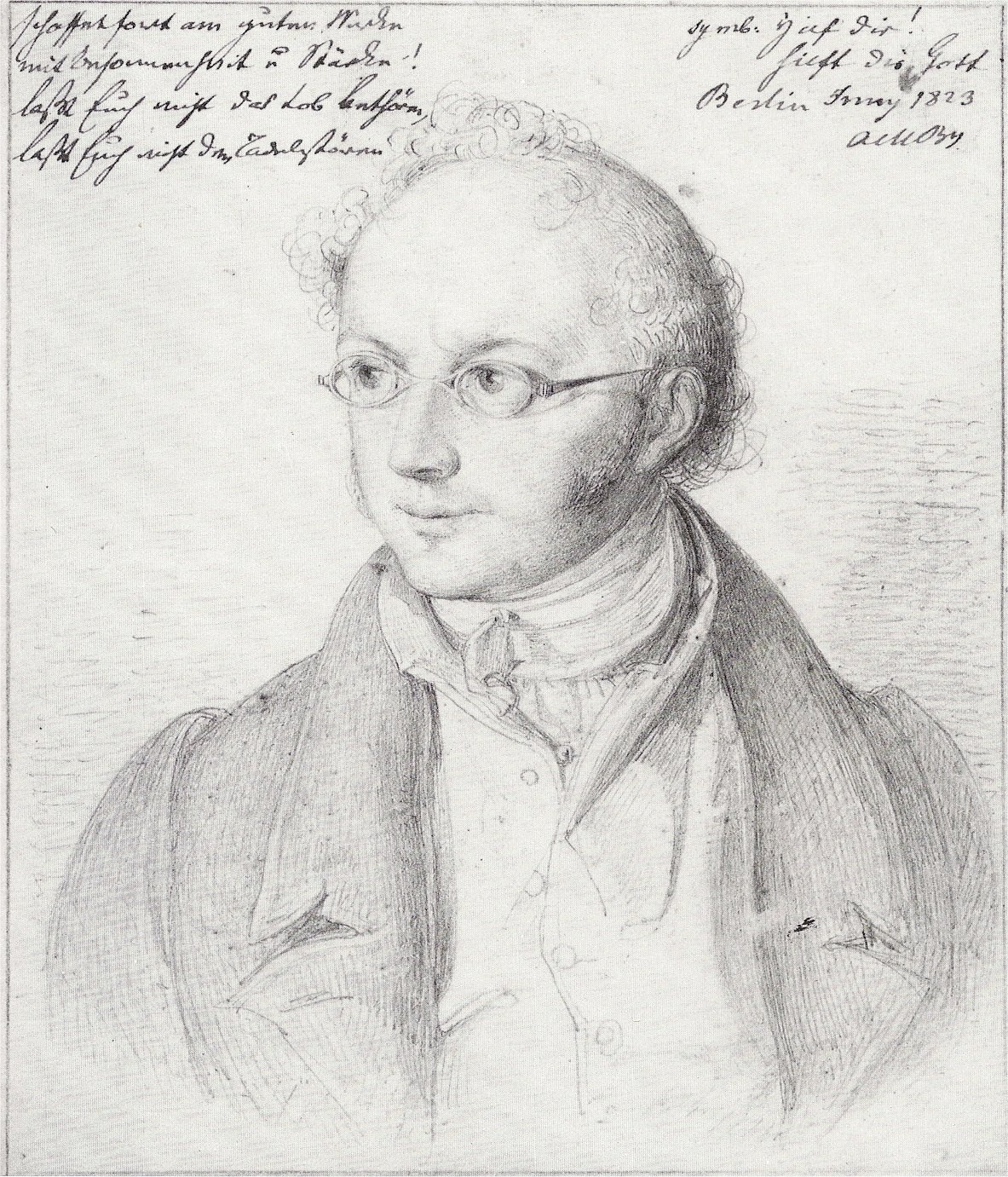
Abraham Mendelssohn Bartholdy, as drawn by Fanny's husband Wilhelm Hensel

The music historian Richard Taruskin suggested that "the life of Fanny Mendelssohn Hensel is compelling proof that women's failure to 'compete' with men on the compositional playing-field has been the result of social prejudice and patriarchical mores (which in the nineteenth century granted only men the right to make the decisions in bourgeois households)." Such attitudes were shared by Mendelssohn's father, who was tolerant, rather than supportive, of her activities as a composer. In 1820, he wrote to her, "Music will perhaps become his [i.e. Felix's] profession, while for you it can and must be only an ornament". Although Felix was privately broadly supportive of her as a composer and a performer, he was cautious (professedly for family reasons) of her publishing her works under her own name. He wrote:

From my knowledge of Fanny I should say that she has neither inclination nor vocation for authorship. She is too much all that a woman ought to be for this. She regulates her house, and neither thinks of the public nor of the musical world, nor even of music at all, until her first duties are fulfilled. Publishing would only disturb her in these, and I cannot say that I approve of it.

The music historian Angela Mace Christian has written that Fanny Mendelssohn "struggled her entire life with the conflicting impulses of authorship versus the social expectations for her high-class status ...; her hesitation was variously a result of her dutiful attitude towards her father, her intense relationship with her brother, and her awareness of contemporary social thought on women in the public sphere." Felix's friend Henry Chorley wrote of Fanny: "Had Madame Hensel been a poor man's daughter, she must have become known to the world by the side of Madame Schumann and Madame Pleyel as a female pianist of the highest class", suggesting that as well as her sex, her social class was limiting for her career.

The biography of the Mendelssohn family compiled from family documents by Fanny's son Sebastian Hensel has been construed by the musicologist Marian Wilson Kimber as intending to represent Fanny as having no aspirations to perform outside the private sphere. Kimber notes that Fanny's "oft-reported longing for a professional music career is not supported by her ... diaries, which are somewhat surprising for how little they reveal about her musical life."

== Felix and Fanny ==
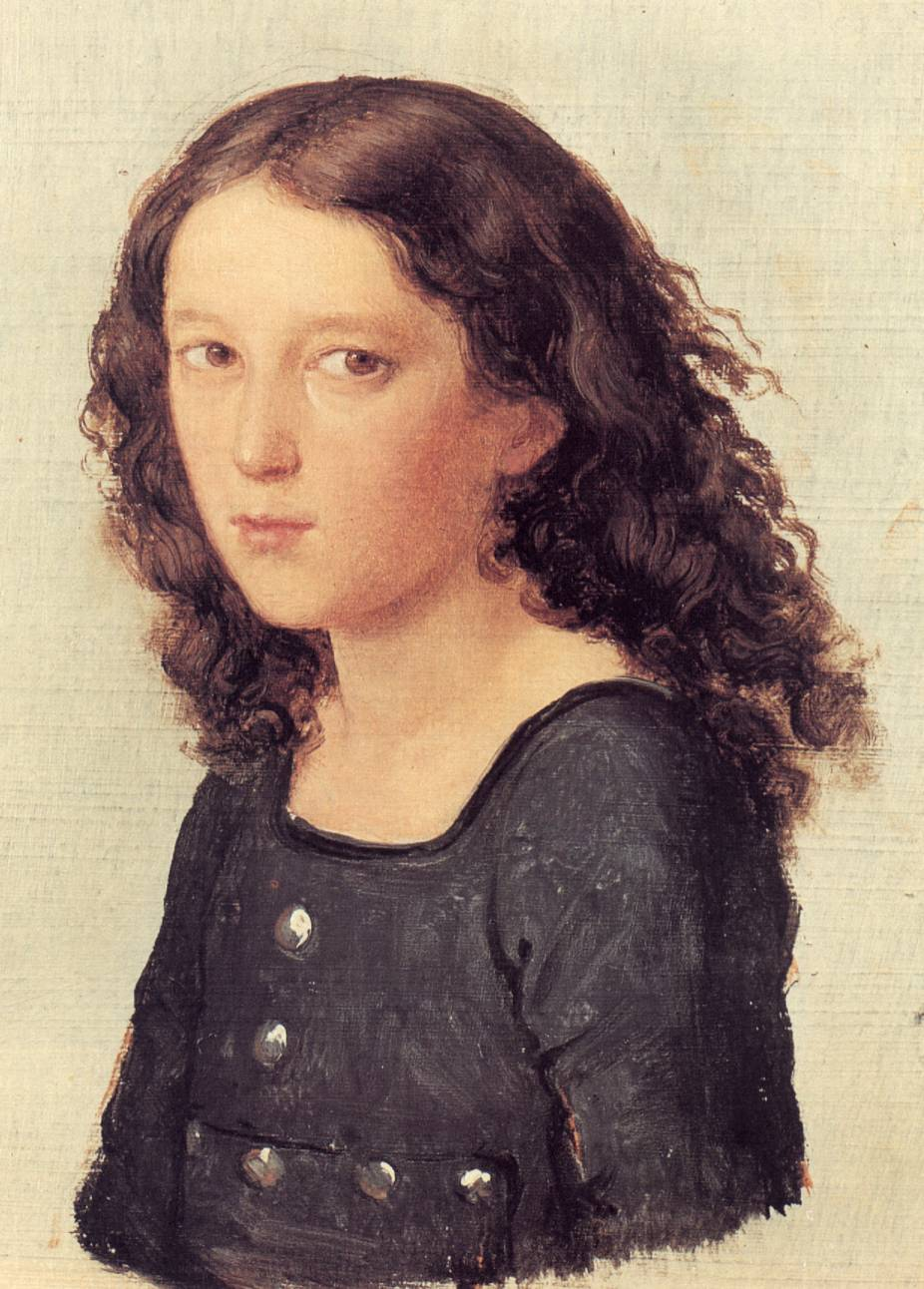
Felix Mendelssohn aged 12 (1821) by Carl Begas

The siblings' bond was strengthened by their shared passion for music. Fanny's works were often played alongside her brother's at the family home in Berlin in a Sunday concert series (Sonntagskonzerte), which was originally organized by her father and after 1831 carried on by Fanny herself. In 1822, when Fanny was 17 and Felix 13, she wrote "Up to the present moment I possess his [Felix's] unbounded confidence. I have watched the progress of his talent step by step, and may say I have contributed to his development. I have always been his only musical adviser, and he never writes down a thought before submitting it to my judgment."

In 1826/1827 Felix arranged with Fanny for some of her songs to be published under his name, three in his Op. 8 collection and three more in his Op. 9. In 1842, this resulted in an embarrassing moment when Queen Victoria, receiving Felix at Buckingham Palace, expressed her intention of singing to the composer her favourite of his songs, Italien (to words by Franz Grillparzer), which Felix confessed was by Fanny.

Fanny's support of Felix's music was clearly demonstrated during the 1838 rehearsals in Berlin for her brother's oratorio St. Paul at the Singverein, which she attended at the invitation of its conductor, Carl Friedrich Rungenhagen. In a letter to her brother she described attending the rehearsals and "suffering and champing at the bit ... as I heard the whining and [the accompanist's] dirty fingers on the piano ... They started [the passage] 'mache dich auf' at half the right tempo, and then I instinctively called out, 'My God, it must go twice as fast!'" The consequence was that Rungenhagen consulted her closely about all details of the rehearsals and performance; this included her firm instructions not to add a tuba to the organ part. "I assured them that they should be ruled by my word, and they'd better do it for God's sake."

There was a lifelong musical correspondence between the two. Fanny helped Felix by providing constructive criticism of pieces and projects, which he always considered very carefully. Felix would rework pieces solely based on the suggestions she made, and nicknamed her "Minerva" after the Roman goddess of wisdom. Their correspondence of 1840/41 reveals that they were both outlining scenarios for an opera on the subject of the Nibelungenlied (which never materialized): Fanny wrote "The hunt with Siegfried's death provides a splendid finale to the second act."

== Marriage and later life ==
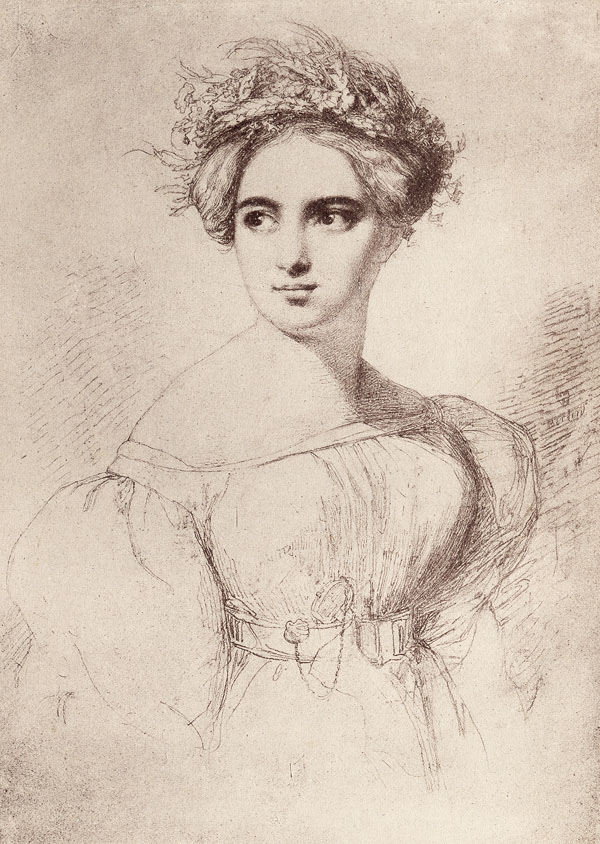
Fanny Mendelssohn, sketched in 1829 by Wilhelm Hensel

In 1829, after a courtship of several years (they had first met in 1821 when she was 16), Fanny married the artist Wilhelm Hensel, and the following year gave birth to their only child, Sebastian Hensel. She later had at least two miscarriages or stillbirths, in 1832 and 1837.

In 1830 came her first public notice as a composer, when John Thomson, who had met her in Berlin the previous year, wrote in the London journal The Harmonicon in praise of a number of her songs that had been shown to him by Felix. Her public debut at the piano (one of only three known public performances according to Mendelssohn scholar R. Larry Todd) came in 1838, when she played her brother's Piano Concerto No. 1.

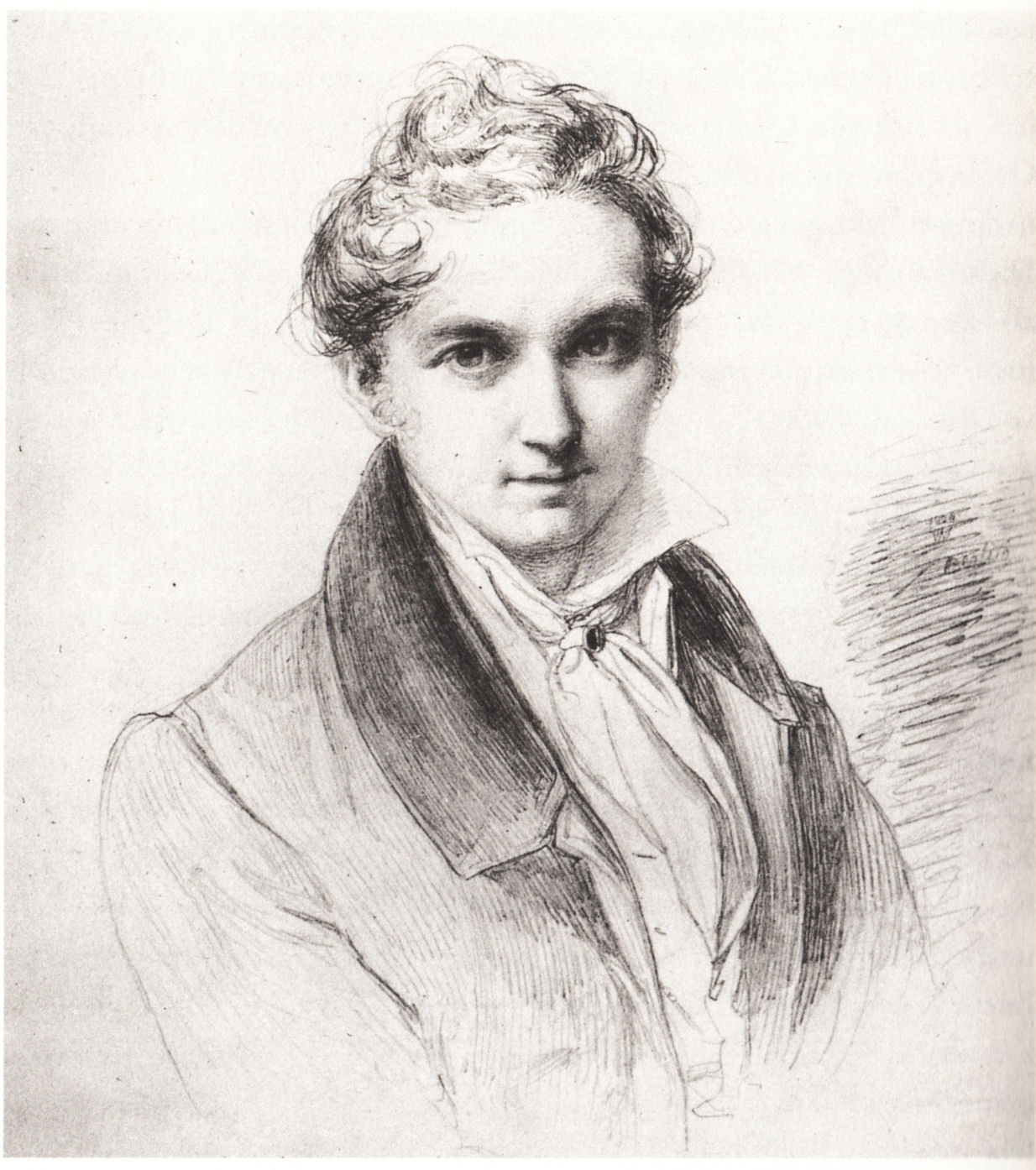
Wilhelm Hensel: Self-portrait (1829)

Wilhelm Hensel, like Felix, was supportive of her composing, but unlike many others of her circle was also in favour of her seeking publication of her works. The music historian Nancy B. Reich has suggested two events which may have increased her confidence. One was her visit to Italy with her husband and Sebastian in 1839–40. This was her first visit to Southern Europe and she felt invigorated and inspired; they also spent time with young French musicians who had won the Prix de Rome (one was the young Charles Gounod) and whose respect for Fanny powered her self-esteem as a musician. The other event was her acquaintance shortly afterwards with the Berlin music enthusiast Robert von Keudell: in her diary she wrote: "Keudell looks at everything new that I write with the greatest interest, and points out to me if there is something to be corrected ... He has always given me the very best counsel."

In 1846, after an approach by two Berlin publishers and without consulting Felix, she decided to publish a collection of her songs (as her Op. 1), under her married name, "Fanny Hensel geb. [i.e. née] Mendelssohn-Bartholdy". After publication, Felix wrote to her "[I] send you my professional blessing on becoming a member of the craft ... may you have much happiness in giving pleasure to others; may you taste only the sweets and none of the bitterness of authorship; may the public pelt you with roses, and never with sand." (12 August 1846). On 14 August Fanny wrote in her journal "Felix has written, and given me his professional blessing in the kindest manner. I know that he is not quite satisfied in his heart of hearts, but I am glad he has said a kind word to me about it." She also wrote about the publication to her friend Angelica von Woringen: "I can truthfully say that I let it happen more than made it happen, and it is this in particular which cheers me ... If [the publishers] want more from me, it should act as a stimulus to achieve. If the matter comes to an end then, I also won't grieve, for I'm not ambitious."

Throughout March 1847 Hensel had many meetings with Clara Schumann. At this time she was working on her Piano Trio Op. 11 and Clara had recently completed her own Piano Trio (Op. 17), which she may have intended to dedicate to Fanny.

== Death ==
On 14 May 1847 Fanny Hensel died in Berlin of complications from a stroke suffered while rehearsing one of her brother's cantatas, The First Walpurgis Night. Felix himself died less than six months later from the same cause (which was also responsible for the deaths of both of their parents and their grandfather Moses), after completing his String Quartet No. 6 in F minor, written in memory of his sister. Fanny was buried next to her parents in a portion of the Dreifaltigkeit Cemetery in Berlin reserved for Jewish converts to Christianity (Neuchristen).

== Compositions ==
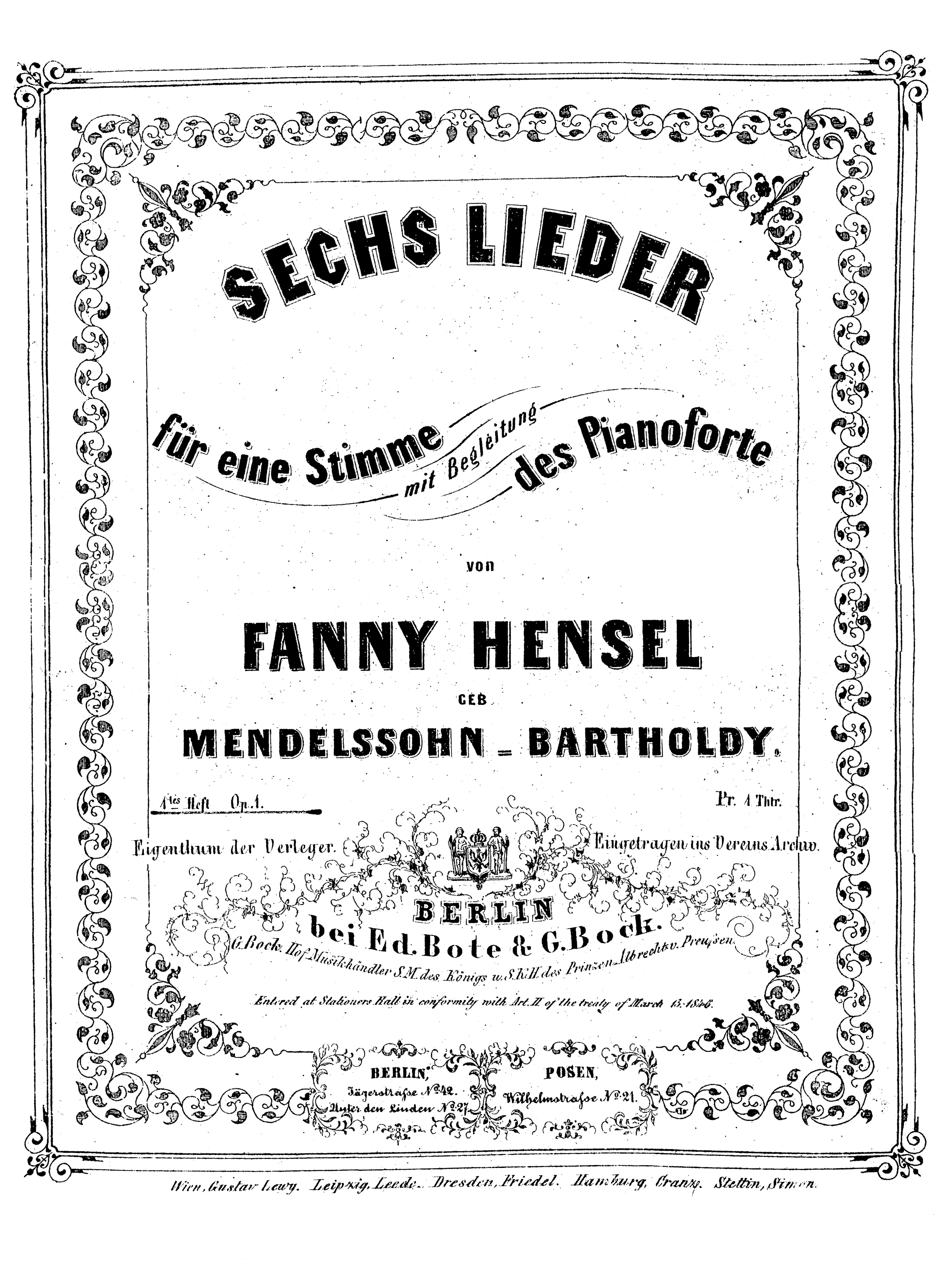
Title page of first edition of Fanny Hensel's Op. 1, 1846

Fanny Mendelssohn composed over 450 pieces of music. Her compositions include a string quartet, a piano trio, a piano quartet, an orchestral overture, four cantatas, over 125 pieces for the piano, and in excess of 250 lieder (art songs). Six of her songs were originally published under Felix's name in his Opus 8 and 9 collections. Her piano works are often in the manner of songs, and many carry the name Lied für Klavier (Song for Piano). This style of piano music was most successfully developed by Felix, whose first set (Op. 19b) appeared in 1829–30, with a second set (Op. 30) appearing in 1833–34. Fanny's sets of Lieder für Klavier were written in the period 1836–1837, at about the same time as Felix's set Op. 38.

The majority of Fanny Mendelssohn's compositions are limited to lieder and piano pieces as she felt her abilities did not extend to larger, more intricate compositions. She was also undoubtedly hampered by the fact that, unlike her brother, she had never studied or played any string instruments, experience that would have assisted her in writing chamber or orchestral works. After completing her string quartet, she wrote to Felix in 1835, "I lack the ability to sustain ideas properly and give them the needed consistency. Therefore lieder suit me best, in which, if need be, merely a pretty idea without much potential for development can suffice." She was an early example of women composers of a string quartet; she had also earlier written, with the assistance of Zelter, a piano quartet in 1822 (her first large-scale work), and, despite her reservations in her letter to Felix, she wrote in her last year a piano trio (Op. 11). Her Easter Sonata written in 1828, was unpublished in her lifetime. It was discovered and attributed to her brother in 1970, before examination of the manuscript and a mention of the work in her diary finally established in 2010 that the work was hers.

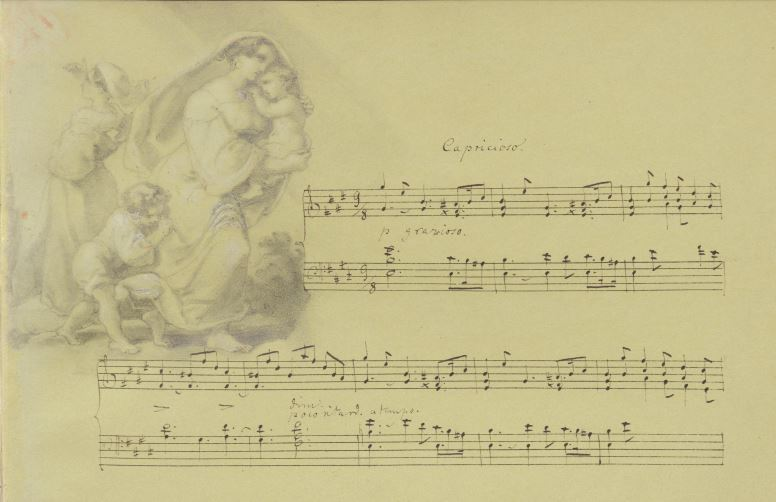
April from the manuscript of Fanny Hensel's Das Jahr (illustration by Wilhelm Hensel)

Most of Hensel's work after her marriage was on a small scale, songs and piano pieces. In 1831 for the first birthday of her son Sebastian, she created a cantata, the Lobgesang (Song of Praise). Two other works for orchestra, soloists and choir were written in that year, Hiob (Job) and an oratorio in sixteen sections, Höret zu, merket auf (Listen and take note). In 1841 she composed a cycle of piano pieces depicting the months of the year, Das Jahr (The Year). The music was written on tinted sheets of paper and illustrated by her husband, with each piece accompanied by a short poem. The writer Kristine Forney has suggested that the poems, artwork and coloured paper may represent the different stages of life, with others suggesting they represent her own life. In a letter from Rome, Fanny described the process behind composing Das Jahr:

I have been composing a good deal lately, and have called my piano pieces after the names of my favourite haunts, partly because they really came into my mind at these spots, partly because our pleasant excursions were in my mind while I was writing them. They will form a delightful souvenir, a kind of second diary. But do not imagine that I give these names when playing them in society, they are for home use entirely.

After Das Jahr her only large-scale work was her Piano Trio Op. 11 of 1847.

=== Style and form ===
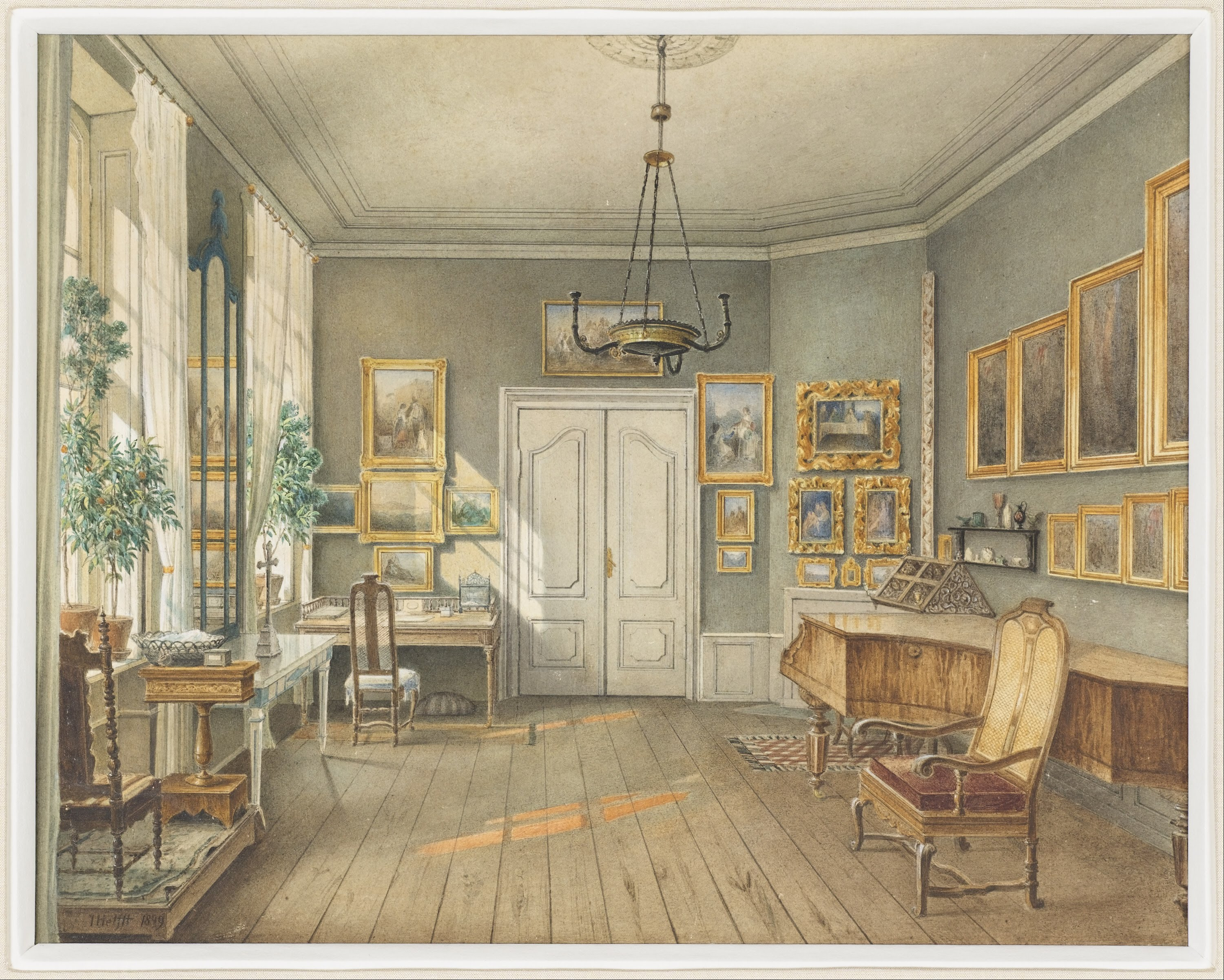
Fanny Hensel's music room in the Hensel house, Leipziger Str. 3, Berlin

Angela Mace, the musicologist who proved Fanny Hensel's authorship of the Easter Sonata, considers that Fanny was much more experimental with her lieder than Felix, noting that her works have a "harmonic density" that serves to express emotion.

R. Larry Todd has pointed out that, although there has been much comment about the influence of Felix's music on Fanny (and some comment on that of Fanny on Felix), both were strongly influenced by the later music of Ludwig van Beethoven in terms of form, tonality and fugal counterpoint. This is apparent for example in Fanny's string quartet.

The musicologist Stephen Rodgers has claimed that the relative lack of analysis of Fanny Hensel's music has left the presence of triple hypermeter in her songs mostly overlooked. He points to this type of meter being used by Mendelssohn to alter the speed of vocals in the song and to reflect emotions through distortion of duple norms. He also points to a lack of tonic harmony as a recurring characteristic of her lieder, identifying it in the lied Verlust (Loss) as a deliberate means to reflect the song's themes of abandonment and failing to find love. Mendelssohn's use of word painting is also acknowledged as a common element of her style, a method of stressing emotion in the song text. She commonly used strophic form for her songs, and her piano accompaniments frequently doubled the voice-line, characteristics also of the music of her teachers Zelter and Berger. Though the foundation created by her teachers would remain, Rodgers suggests that she increasingly turned to through-composed forms as her style developed, as a way to respond to elements of poetic text.

== Legacy ==
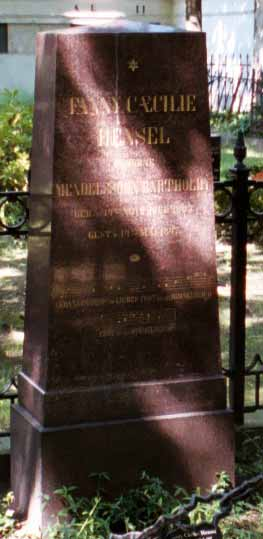
Grave of Fanny Hensel in Berlin

From the 1980s onwards there has been renewed interest in Mendelssohn and her works. In November 2017, the Mendelssohn-Haus museum in Leipzig inaugurated a permanent exhibit dedicated to her. The Fanny & Felix Mendelssohn Museum, which is dedicated to the lives and work of the two siblings, opened on 29 May 2018 in Hamburg.

Minor planet 9331 Fannyhensel is named after her.

On 14 November 2021, Google commemorated Fanny Hensel's 216th birthday with a Google Doodle in North America, Iceland, Germany, Greece, Ukraine, Israel, Armenia, Australia and New Zealand.

=== Music ===
Six months before his death, Felix attempted to ensure that his sister received the recognition that had been withheld throughout much of her life. He collected many of her works intending to release them to the public through his publisher, Breitkopf & Härtel. In 1850, the publisher began to distribute Fanny Mendelssohn's unreleased works, starting with Vier Lieder Op. 8. Commencing in the late 1980s, Fanny Mendelssohn's music has become better known, thanks to concert performances and new recordings. Her Easter Sonata for piano, formerly attributed to Felix, was premiered in her name by Andrea Lam on 12 September 2012.

=== Writings ===
Fanny Mendelssohn published no writings during her lifetime. Selected letters and journal entries were published during the 19th century, notably by Sebastian Hensel in his book on the Mendelssohn family. Her collected letters to Felix, edited by Marcia Citron, were published in 1987.

=== Biographical and musicological studies ===
During the 19th century Fanny mainly figured as a bystander in biographies and studies of her brother Felix; typically she was a representative of a supposed 'feminizing' influence that sapped his artistry. In the 20th century the conventional narrative switched to presenting Felix as disapproving of his sister's musical activities and seeking to contain them, whilst the 'feminizing' accusation against Fanny evaporated. From the 1980s onwards Fanny Mendelssohn has been the subject of many academic books and articles. Kimber opines that "The tale of Fanny, the 'suppressed' composer, has so readily found a place in the biographies of the siblings because of its resemblance to prevailing models for the life of a 'Great Composer' ... based in Romantic ideology about male artists. ... Hensel fits neatly into a traditional narrative of the suffering artistic genius ... with a modern twist: the feminine gender of its main character. Thus two characters [Felix and Fanny] are forced to bear the weight of two centuries of gender ideology."

A catalogue of the works of Fanny Mendelssohn has been prepared by Renate Hellwig-Unruh in 2000, according to which each work may be referred to by its "H-U number".

Sheila Hayman, the great-great-great-granddaughter of Fanny Mendelssohn, released a 97-minute documentary Fanny: The Other Mendelssohn in 2023.
