= Luise Reuter =

Wife of Fritz Reuter

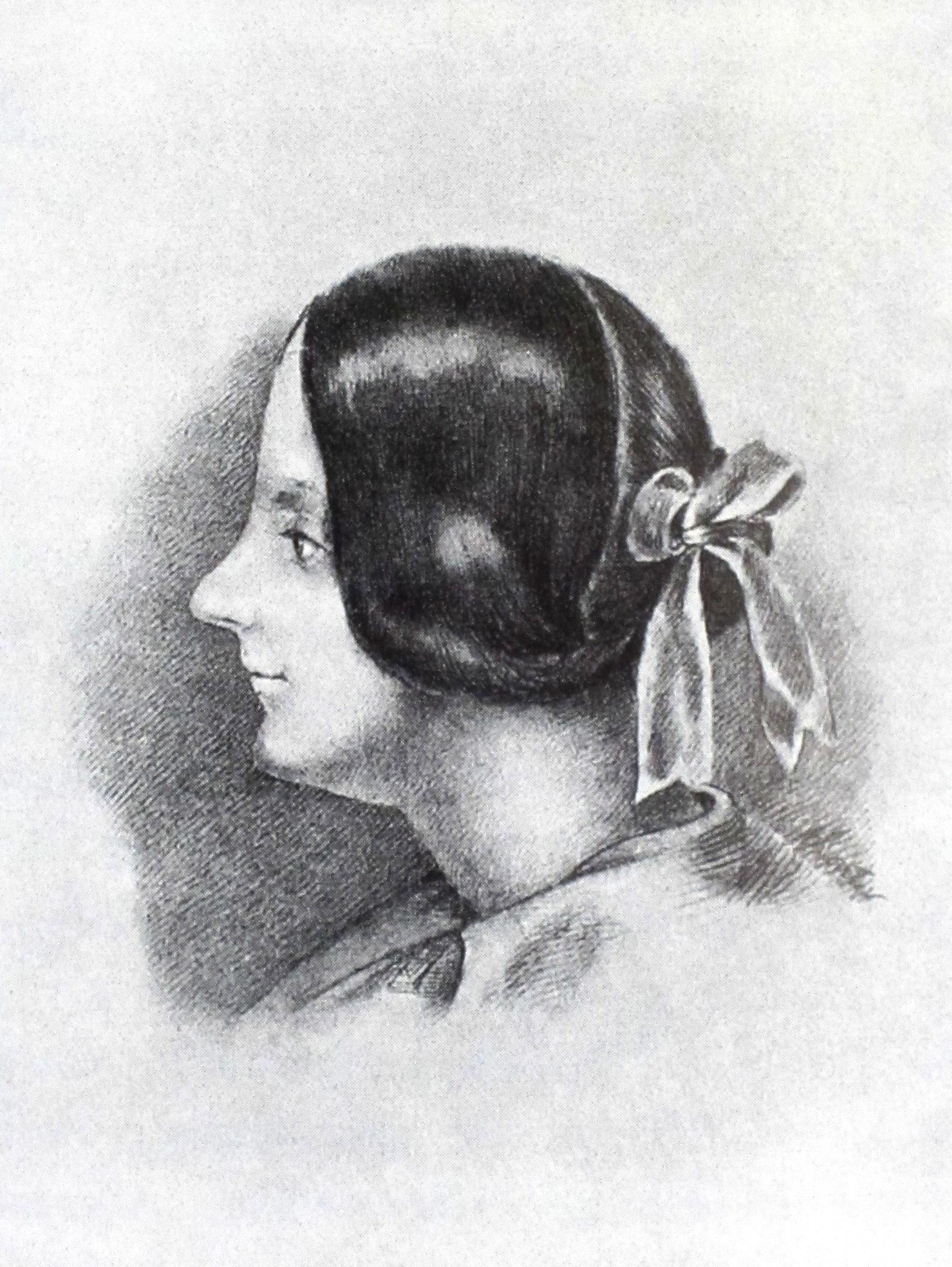
Luise Reuter, Chalk drawing by Fritz Reuter

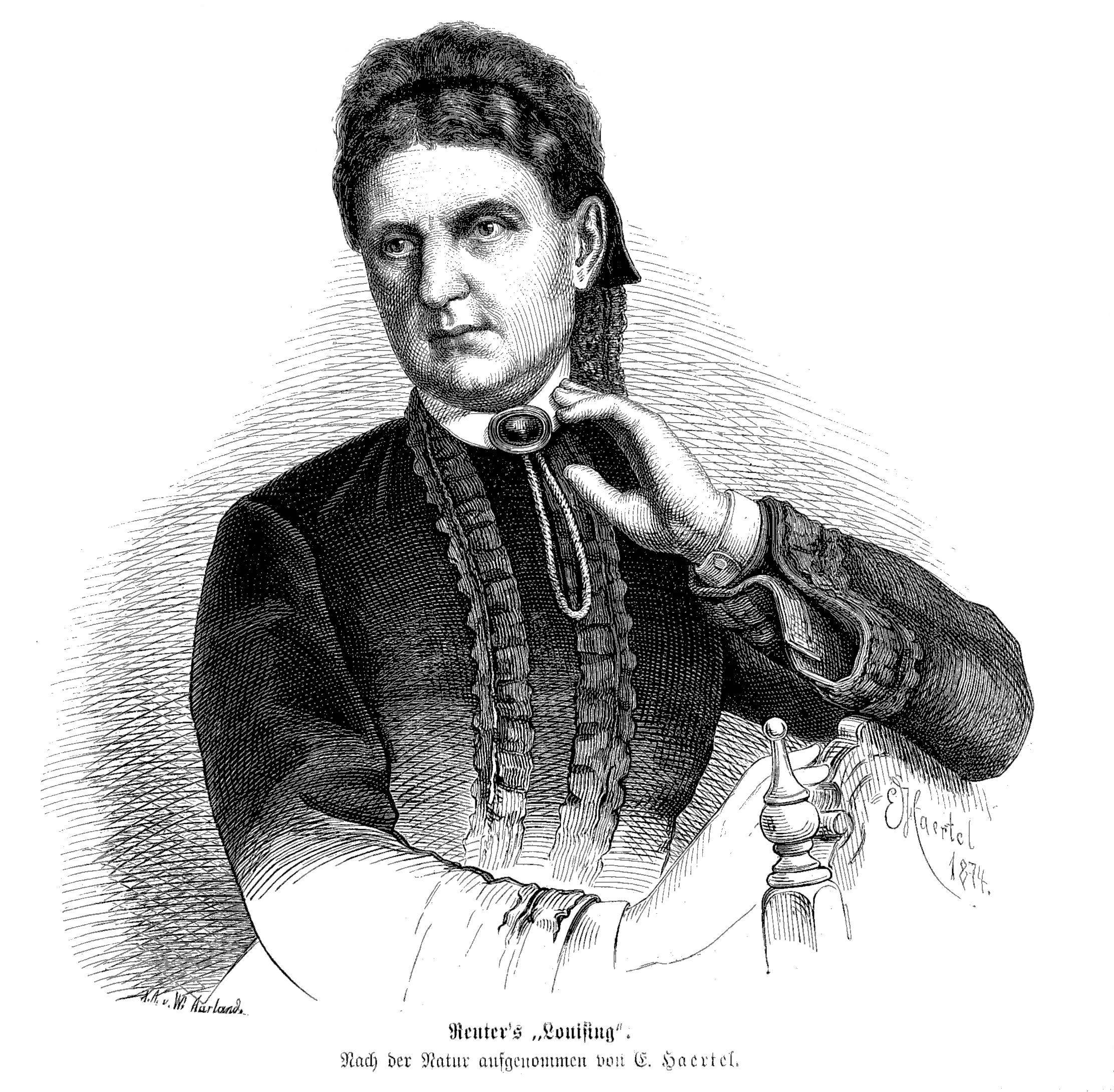
Luise Reuter

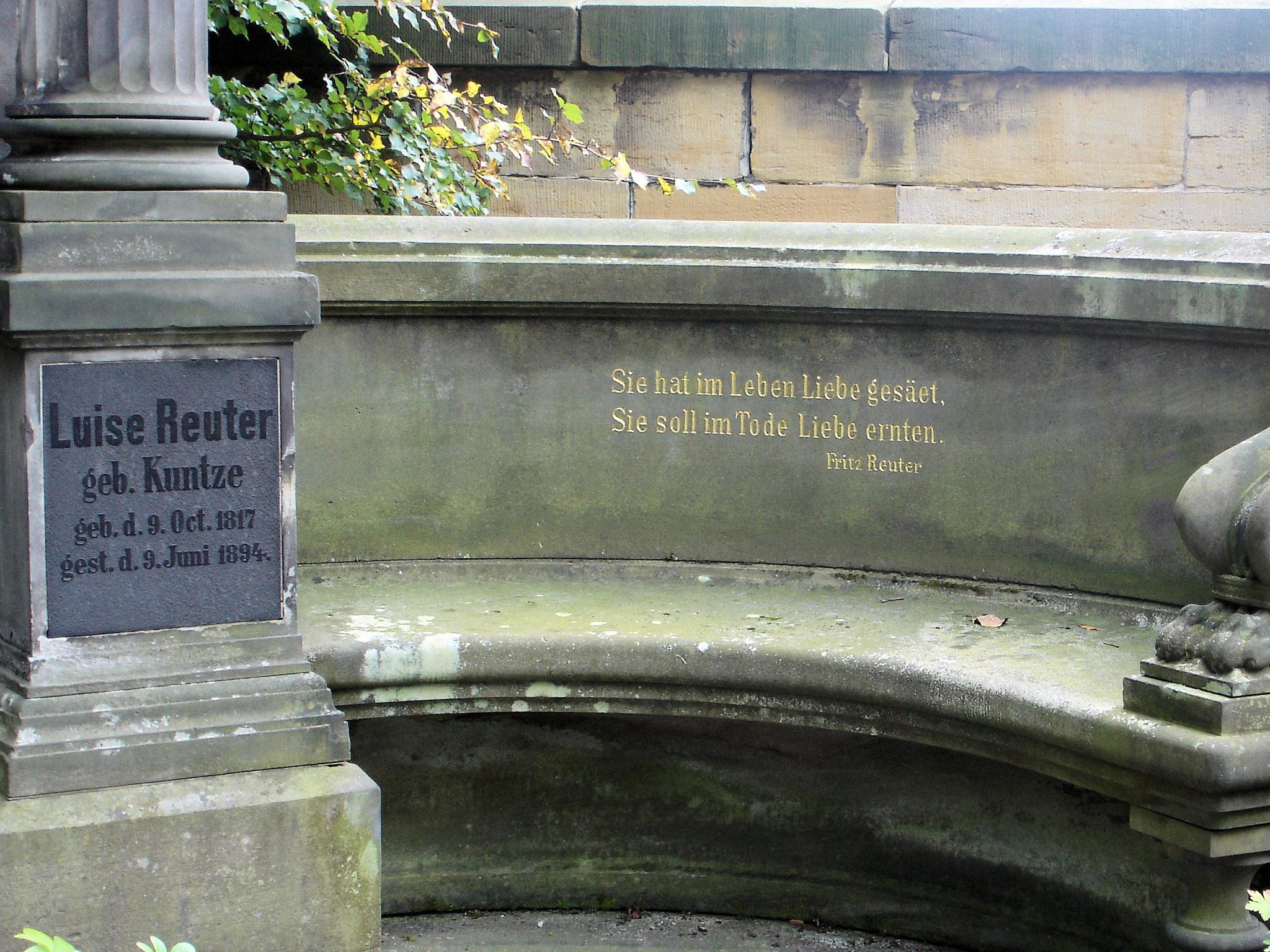
Grave in Eisenach

Luise Charlotte Marie Reuter, also Louise R. (9 October 1817) as Luise Charlotte Marie Kuntze – 9 June 1894) was the wife of the poet and Low German writer Fritz Reuter.

== Life ==
Born in Grevesmühlen, Reuter was the second of eight children of the rector of the Grevesmühlen town school and later pastor in Roggenstorf, Wilhelm (Gottlieb Peter) Kuntze (1778–1863), and his wife Wilhelmine (Caroline Christine), née Scharff (1794–1859). The parents moved to Roggenstorf in 1818, where the father took over the pastorate and held it until 1858.

As the eldest daughter, Luise had to take on a variety of duties in the large household. From 1834 to 1835, Luise Kuntze attended the Ernestinenschule in Lübeck. In April 1844, she then took up a position as a child educator with Pastor Friedrich Johann Augustin (1794–1862) in Rittermannshagen.

The Rust family, where Fritz Reuter worked, and the Augustin family were friends, so that Reuter and Luise Kuntze soon met. In May 1847, the two became engaged. On 16 June 1851, they married in the village church of Roggenstorf and moved to Treptow an der Tollense. Luise supported the household by giving piano and French lessons. They then lived in Neubrandenburg from April 1856 to 1863, where her husband rose to become an acclaimed writer of national standing. Deep insights into Luise's world of thought are provided by numerous letters to her best friend, the landowner's wife Marie Peters (1822–1897), with whom she corresponded for decades from 1856.

Having moved to Eisenach, the Reuter couple, who remained childless, had an Italian-style villa built below the Wartburg in 1866, which today houses the Reuter-Wagner-Museum. When her husband died in 1874 at the age of 76, she had an imposing tomb built for him in Eisenach.

Reuter outlived her husband by twenty years. Her role as wife and executor of Fritz Reuter's estate has been controversially discussed in Reuter literature for many decades, especially with regard to his departure from Mecklenburg. Fritz Reuter had intended the following epitaph for his wife: "She has sown love in life, she shall reap love in death".

The brothers Heinrich (born 1816), Carl (born 1824) and Theodor (born 1828) emigrated to Australia in 1852. The brother Friedrich (born 1832) emigrated to South America in 1852. The brother Theodor Kuntze is shown to have been in the US in the 1890s.

== Honours ==
In 1927, the Lowise-Reuter-Ring in Berlin's Hufeisensiedlung was named in her honour. In 1997, the village community centre in Roggenstorf was named after Luise Reuter. A memorial stone south of the church in Grevesmühlen, erected around 1999 by the Grevesmühlen local history society, commemorates her. In 2011, a street in the Rostock district of Reutershagen was named after Luise Reuter.

== Letters ==
In Fritz Reuter Literary Archive Berlin:

- 5 letters Luise Reuter to Ludwig Walesrode 3 January 1864 to 9 July 1867.
- 9 letters Luise Reuter to various recipients (Carl Hinstorff, August Junkermann and others) 9 July 1867 to 19 October 1891
- 4 letters written by Luise Reuter and signed by her as "Fritz Reuter" to various recipients 3 February 1871 to 30 December 1873
- Promissory notes issued by Dethloff Carl Hinstorff to Luise Reuter and countersigned by her for book fees received 27 September 1875 to 19 October 1891.

Further letters of Luise Reuter in:

- Badische Landesbibliothek
- Bayerische Staatsbibliothek
- Goethe- und Schiller-Archiv
- Schleswig-Holsteinische Landesbibliothek.
