= Piano Trio (Hensel) =

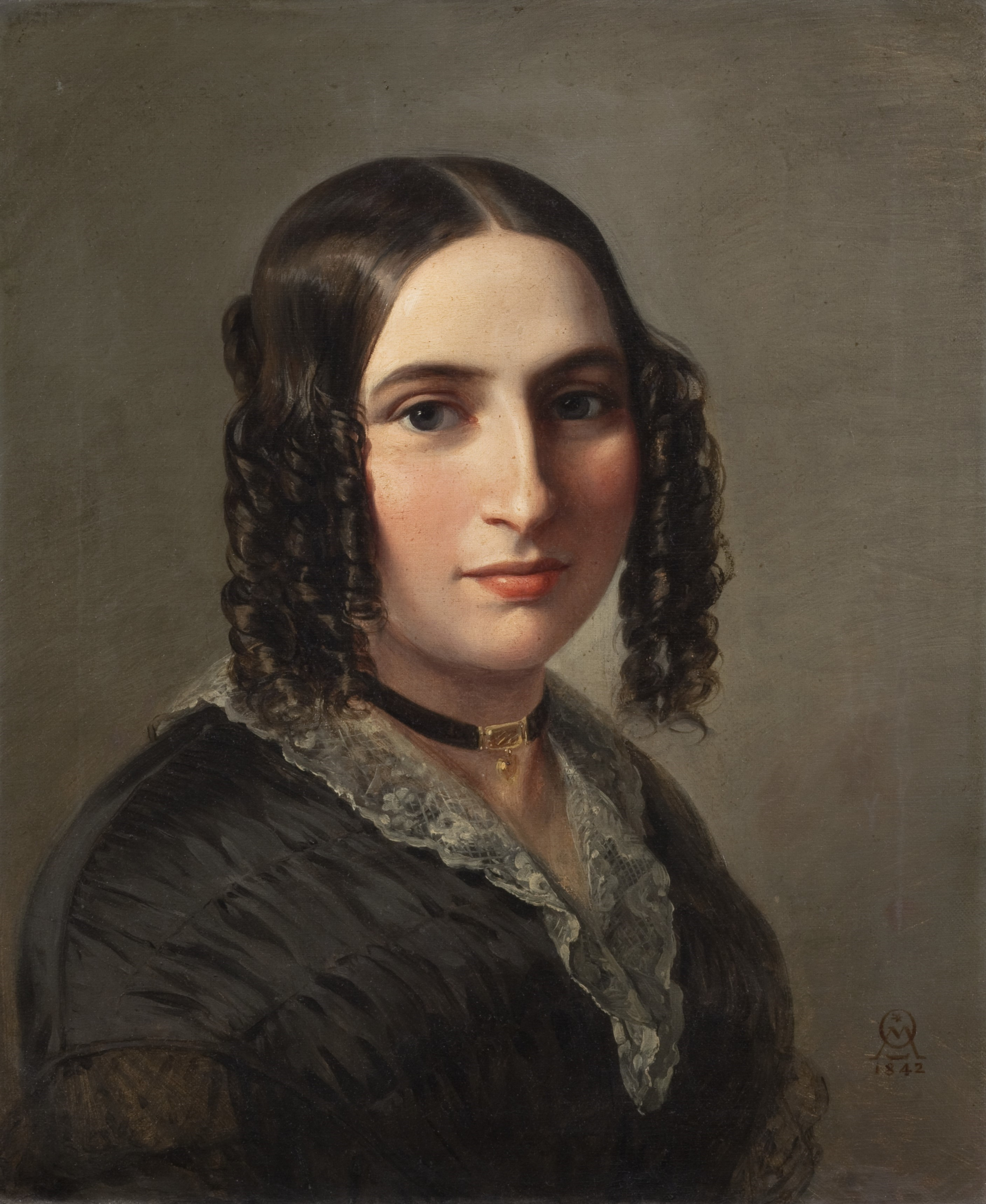
Fanny Hensel, 1842, by Moritz Daniel Oppenheim

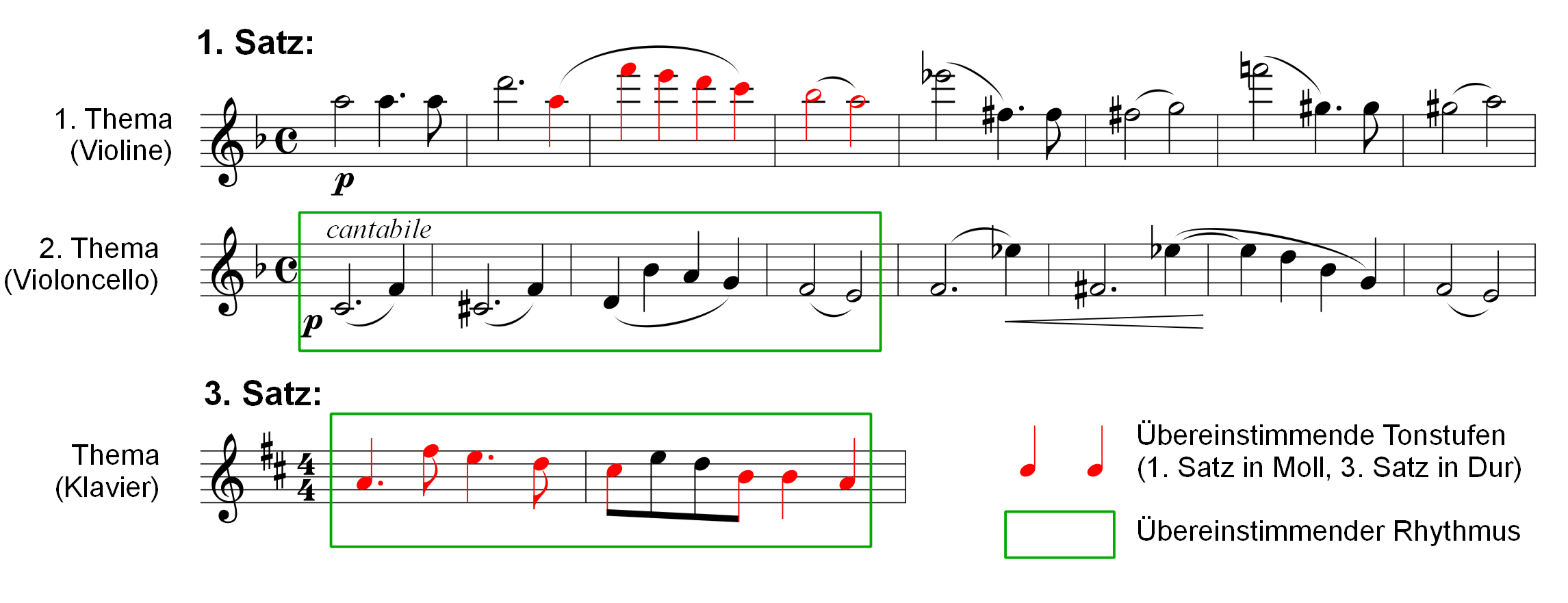
Comparison between themes of the 1st and 3rd movements in Fanny Hensel's Trio for violin, cello, piano, in D minor, Opus 11.

The Piano Trio for violin, cello, piano in D minor, Op. 11, by Fanny Hensel was conceived between 1846 and 1847 as a birthday present for her sister Rebecka, and posthumously published in 1850, three years after the composer's death.

The trio is in four movements:

1. Allegro molto vivace
2. Andante espressivo
3. Lied: Allegretto
4. Allegretto moderato

In 1847, an anonymous critic in the Neue Berliner Musikzeitung found in the trio “...broad, sweeping foundations that build themselves up through stormy waves into a marvelous edifice. In this respect the first movement is a masterpiece, and the trio most highly original.” Angela Mace Christian refers to the piece in Grove Music Online as "one of her most impressive chamber works."

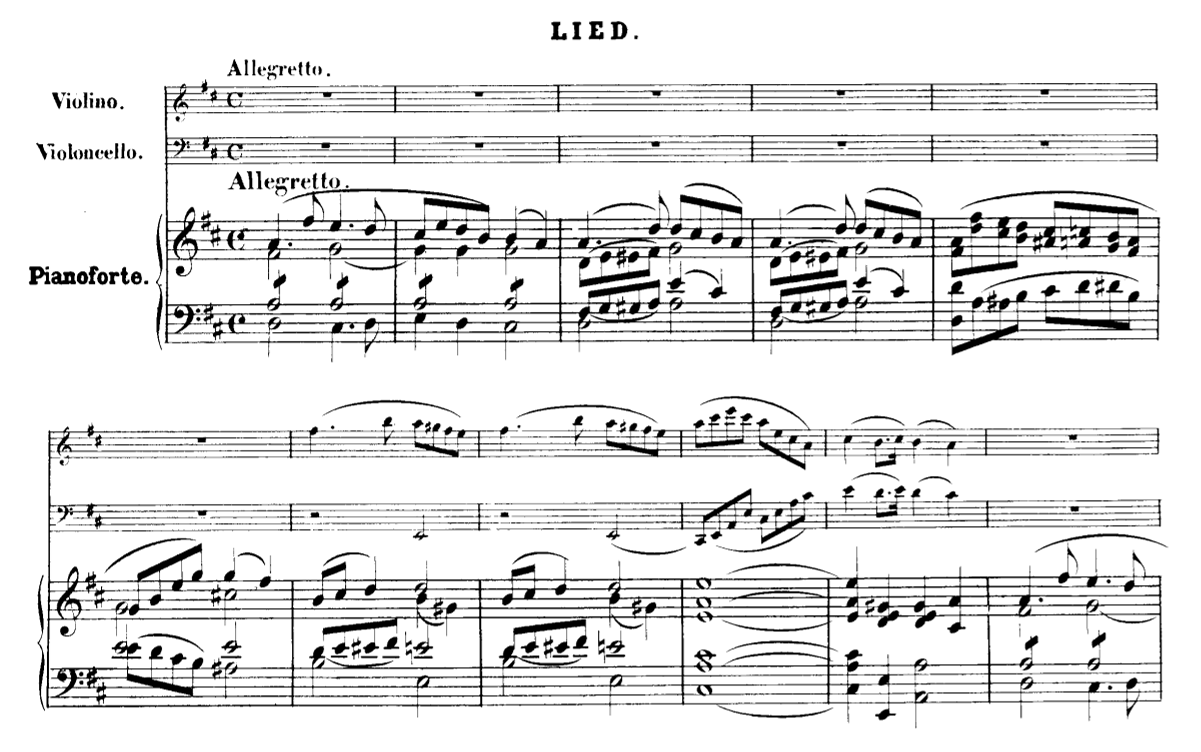
Fanny Hensel. Piano Trio Op. 11: Beginning of the 3rd movement, "Song." First edition, Breitkopf and Härtel, Wiesbaden 1850.

== See also ==
- List of compositions by Fanny Hensel
