= Ferdinand Gumbert =

German composer and vocal teacher

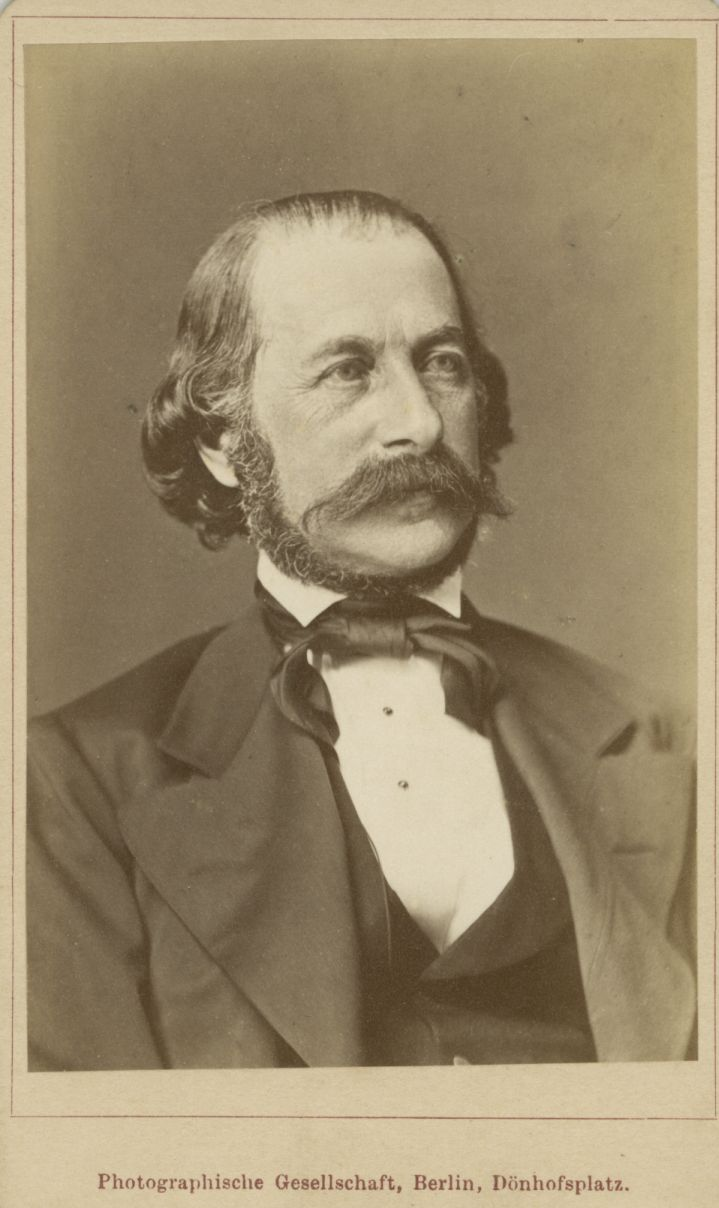
Portrait of Ferdinand Gumbert Supplement to the Darmstädter Tagblatt, Nr.5/1886

Ferdinand Gumbert (22 April 1818 – 6 April 1896) was a German composer, singing teacher and music critic. Initially a singing teacher, he began a stage career as a baritone in 1839.

== Life ==
Gumbert was born in Berlin (Kingdom of Prussia). After an engagement of several years at the Cologne City Theatre (1840–42), he resigned from the stage on the advice of the Kapellmeister Conradin Kreutzer in favour of composition. In addition to his activities as a singing teacher and song composer, he worked from 1881 as a music consultant for the Tägliche Rundschau, as well as for the Neue Berliner Musikzeitung in Berlin.

Among his singing students were Karl Formes and Rosa Le Seur. Gumbert translated numerous libretti from French into German.

Gumbert came from a Mosaic family and was not married. He died in Berlin German Empire at the age of 79.
