= Rosa Le Seur =

German actress and soprano

Rosa Le Seur, married name Rosa Junkermann, (1846 – 1920) was a German stage actress and soprano.

== Life ==
Born in Berlin, Le Seur received her singing lessons from the well-known song composer Ferdinand Gumbert. She worked as the first soubrette and from 1866 was engaged at the Berlin Viktoriatheater, at the court theatre in Meiningen, as well as in Bremen, Nuremberg, Amsterdam, Stuttgart and Breslau, and her most popular roles included Die schöne Galathée, La belle Hélène, Boulotte in Barbe-bleue), La Grande-Duchesse de Gérolstein, Kleine Handschumacherin in La Vie parisienne etc., thus in operettas by Jacques Offenbach.

In Stuttgart, where no operettas were given at that time, she was engaged for 17 years for role of the first Lustspielsoubretten and Salondame.

Her sons from her marriage with August Junkermann, Hans, and Fritz also devoted themselves to acting, as did her stepson Karl Junkermann and his wife Anna Junkermann.
