= Karl Gaillard =

Prussian writer and music journalist

Karl Gaillard (13 January 1813 – 10 January 1851) was a Prussian writer and music journalist.

== Life ==
Born in Potsdam, Gaillard, who lost his father early, attended grammar school in Berlin and in 1829 became an apprentice in the Berlin bookshop of Carl August Challier (1813-1871). On 1 October 1835, he and Challier founded a music and publishing shop under the name C. A. Challier & Co. From 1844 to 1847, he was editor of the Berliner musikalische Zeitung, which was published by Challier. There, he supported the young Richard Wagner by name and sent him his drama Cola Rienzi for review in 1844. Wagner's opera Rienzi (1842) inspired Gaillard to write his drama of the same name. He also wrote under the abbreviation "C. G." for the Signale für die musikalische Welt published in Leipzig.

In the last years of his life he worked as a city councillor and was involved in issues of emigration. Gaillard died a few days before his 38th birthday from "chest pains".

== Work ==
- Zum Kölner Dom, Berlin: Challier 1843 (mit Dombaulieder von Philipp Kaufmann) (Digitalisat)
- Bilder aus Tscherkessien. Gedichte, Berlin: Challier 1843 (Digitalisat); 2. edition 1845
- Ottavio Galfagna. Trauerspiel, 1844
- Thomas Aniello. Trauerspiel, 1845
- Cola Rienzi. Tragödie in fünf Aufzügen, Leipzig: Lorck, 1846 (Digitalisat)
- Ueber die Stellung der dramatischen Dichter in Deutschland. Deutsche Theaterzustände mit besonderer Rücksicht auf die Berliner Hofbühne, die eine Musterbühne für Deutschland sein soll, unter der Verwaltung des Herrn etc. von Küstner nebst Vorschläge zu Verbesserungen, Berlin: A. Weinholz 1847 (Digitalisat)
- Wie und wohin? Die Auswanderung und die Kolonisation im Interesse Deutschlands und der Auswanderer, Berlin: Carl Reimers 1849 (Digitalisat)
- Vorträge gehalten in den öffentl. Sitzungen des Berliner-Vereins zur Centralisation deutscher Auswanderung und Colonisation, Nr. 7, Die deutschen Ansiedlungs-Unternehmungen in Süd-Brasilien, Berlin: Büreau des Vereins zur Centralisation deutscher Auswanderung & Colonisation, Berlin 1850
