= Martin Röder =

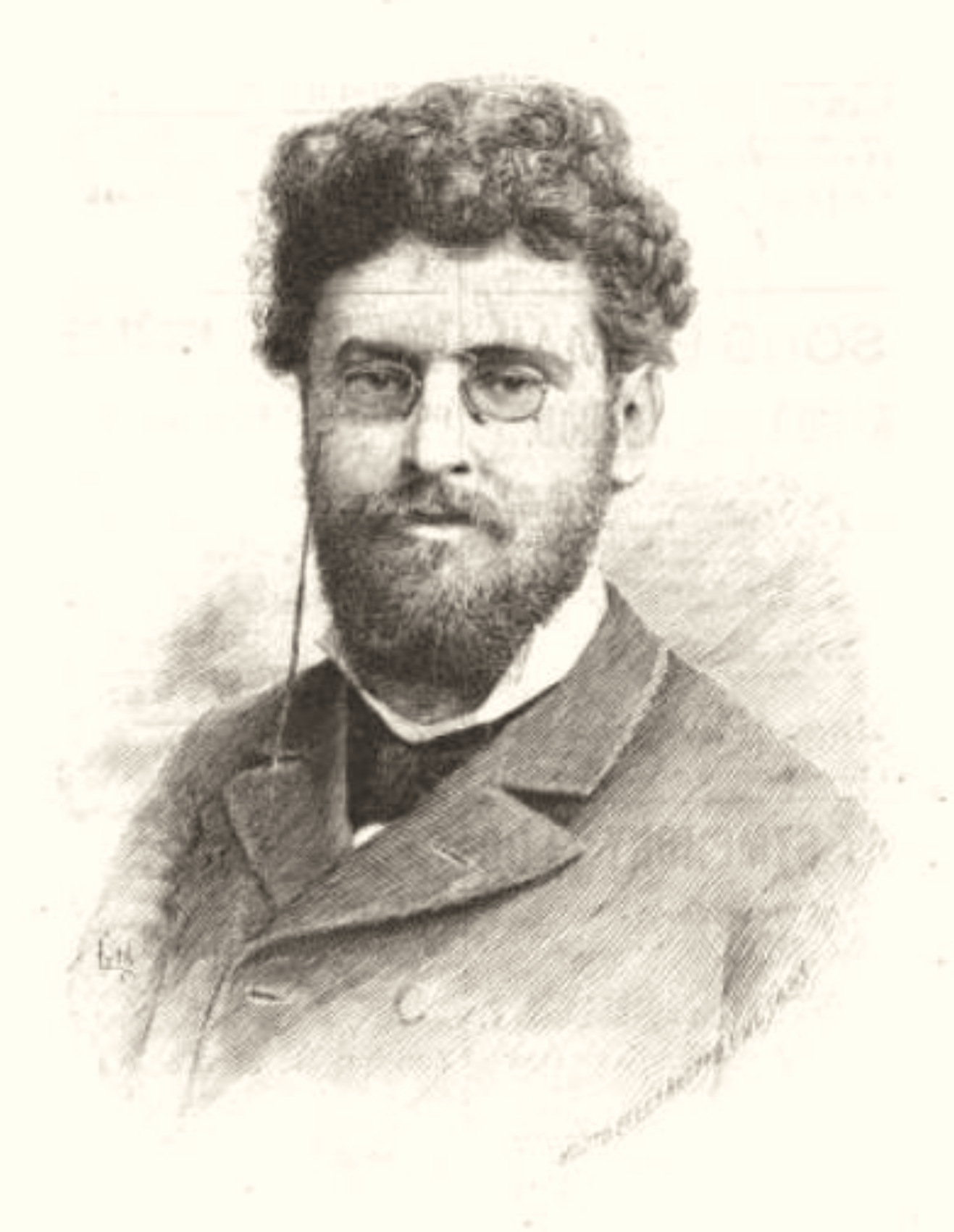
Martin Röder

Martin Röder, sometimes as Martin Roeder, (7 April 1851 – 10 June 1895) was a German composer, conductor, voice teacher, music journalist, and writer on music. Born and educated as a musician in Berlin, he began his career as the chorus master at the Teatro Dal Verme (1873-1880). There he also worked as an editor for the Gazzetta Musicale di Milano; also writing for that publication under the pseudonym Raro Miedtner. He worked as an opera conductor in various European cities before embarking as a teacher of singing at conservatories in Berlin, Dublin, and Boston. He died in Boston in 1895.

== Life and career ==
Martin Röder was born in Berlin, Germany on 7 April 1851. He studied composition with Friedrich Kiel and violin with Joseph Joachim. He graduated from the Royal Music Institute of Berlin where he studied from 1870 to 1872. He moved to Italy where he served as chorus master at the Teatro Dal Verme in Milan from 1873 to 1880; a post he gained through the assistance of Casa Ricordi. He founded the Società del Quartetto Corale in Milan in 1875 which became well known from performances of vocal quartets. He simultaneously worked as an opera conductor in the 1870s in Bologna, Turin, and the Azores. He also wrote for Gazzetta Musicale di Milano using the pseudonym Raro Miedtner; also working for that publication as an editor. He also was the Milan correspondent for Neue Berliner Musikzeitung.

In 1880 Röder returned to Berlin to join the voice faculty of the Klindworth-Scharwenka Conservatory where he taught for seven years. He left that post in 1887 when he was appointed a professor of music at the Royal Irish Academy of Music in Dublin. He remained there until immigrating to the United States in 1892 when he became the head of the voice faculty at the New England Conservatory in Boston. He remained there for only a year, and thereafter taught singing privately in Boston. His voice students in America included soprano Lillian Nordica and tenor Nikolaus Rothmühl.

Röder composed three operas: Pietro Candiano IV, Giuditta, and Vera; the latter of which was staged at the Hamburg State Opera in 1881. His other compositions include the symphonic poems Azorenfahrt and Leonore; the overture Attila; chamber music such as "Trio in F minor", "Quintet in A", and "Quartet in B-flat minor"; and the mystery plays with music Santa Maria appiè della croce (text by Torquato Tasso) and Maria Magdalena (text by Röder). He was the author of the treatises Über den Stand der oftentlichen Musikpflege in Italian (1881, Breitkopf und Härtel), Studj critici raccolti (1881, Milan), and Aus dem Tagebuch eines wandernden Kapellmeisters (1882, Leipzig).

He died in Cambridge, Massachusetts on 7 June 1895.
