= List of compositions by Fanny Hensel =

Structured list, by opus number and by date of origin

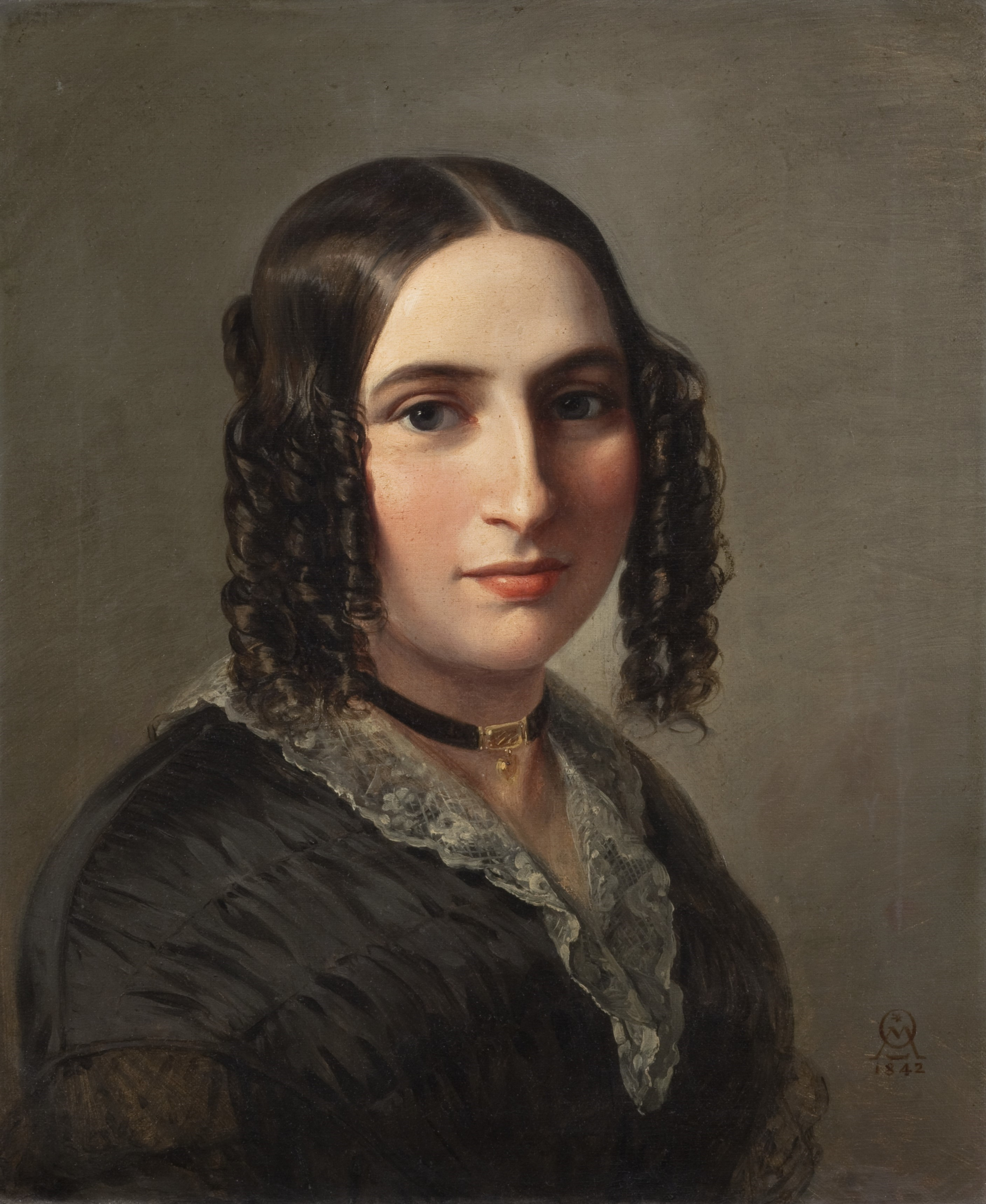
Fanny Hensel, 1842

There are 466 known musical compositions by Fanny Hensel:

- The first section of this page lists compositions by Opus number (Op.), in order of publication (which only partially covers Fanny Hensel's output).
- The second section lists all compositions chronologically, according to Renate Hellwig-Unruh's catalogue of compositions by Fanny Hensel (published in 2000), other than those for which later research established a different date of composition (as is the case for the Easter Sonata).

== In contemporary publications ==
There were some 15 years between the first publication of six works by Fanny Hensel in her brother Felix Mendelssohn's Op. 8 and 9 (under his name), and her own publications of music she composed, with her own opus numbers.

=== Nos. 2, 3 and 12 in Felix Mendelssohn's Op. 8 ===
Felix Mendelssohn's Op. 8, Zwölf Gesänge, was published in 1826 (Nos. 1–6) and 1827 (Nos. 1–12). These songs by Fanny Hensel are contained in the volume:

2. Das Heimweh.
3. Italien.
12. Suleika und Hatem.

=== Nos. 7, 10 and 12 in Felix Mendelssohn's Op. 9 ===
Felix Mendelssohn's Op. 9, Zwölf Lieder, was published in 1830. These Lieder by Fanny Hensel are contained in the volume:

7. Sehnsucht (8).
10. Verlust.
12. Die Nonne.

=== Op. 1 – Lieder ===
Sechs Lieder für eine Stimme mit Begleitung des Pianoforte, Op. 1, published 1846:

1. Schwanenlied. Andante.
2. Wanderlied (2). Allegro molto vivace.
3. Warum sind denn die Rosen so blass. Andante.
4. Maienlied. Allegretto.
5. Morgenständchen. Allegro molto quasi presto.
6. Gondellied. Allegretto.

=== Op. 2 – Songs Without Words ===
Vier Lieder für das Pianoforte, Op. 2, published in 1846:

1. Lied. Andante.
2. Andante con moto.
3. Villa Mills. Allegretto grazioso.
4. Klavierstück. Allegro molto vivace.

=== Op. 3 – Gartenlieder ===
Gartenlieder: Sechs Gesänge für Sopran, Alt, Tenor und Bass, Op. 3, published in 1847:

1. Hörst du nicht die Bäume rauschen. Allegretto.
2. Schöne Fremde. Moderato.
3. Im Herbste (3). Allegro ma non troppo.
4. Morgengruß (1). Allegretto grazioso.
5. Abendlich schon rauscht der Wald. Andante.
6. Im Wald. Allegro vivace.

=== Op. 4 and 5 – Songs Without Words ===
Six mélodies pour le piano, Op. 4 and 5, published in 1847.

First book (Op. 4):

1. Allegro assai.
2. Allegretto.
3. Allegro molto quasi presto.

Second book (Op. 5):

4. Lento appassionato.
5. Allegro molto vivace.
6. Mélodie.

=== Op. 6 – Songs Without Words ===
Vier Lieder für das Pianoforte: II. Heft, Op. 6, published in 1847:

1. Lied. Andante espressivo.
2. Lied. Allegro vivace.
3. O Traum der Jugend, o goldner Stern. Andante cantabile.
4. Il Saltarello Romano. Tarantella. Allegro molto.

=== Op. 7 – Lieder ===
Sechs Lieder für eine Stimme mit Begleitung des Pianoforte, Op. 7, published 1847:

1. Nachtwanderer. Andante con moto.
2. Erwin. Allegretto con espressione.
3. Frühling. Allegro molto.
4. Du bist die Ruh'. Moderato assai.
5. Bitte. Larghetto.
6. Dein ist mein Herz. Feierlich leidenschaftlich.

=== Op. 8 – Songs Without Words ===
Vier Lieder für das Pianoforte, Op. 8, published posthumously in 1850:

1. Lied. Allegro moderato.
2. Lied. Andante con espressione.
3. Lied. Larghetto.
4. Wanderlied. Presto.

=== Op. 9 – Lieder ===
Sechs Lieder mit Begleitung des Pianoforte, Op. 9, published posthumously in 1850:

1. Die Ersehnte. Andante con moto.
2. Ferne. Andante.
3. Der Rosenkranz.
4. Die frühen Gräber. Lento e largo.
5. Der Maiabend. Allegretto.
6. Die Mainacht. Andante.

=== Op. 10 – Lieder ===
Fünf Lieder mit Begleitung des Pianoforte, Op. 10, published posthumously in 1850:

1. Nach Süden. Allegro molto vivace.
2. Vorwurf.
3. Abendbild (1). Andante con moto.
4. Im Herbste (2). Adagio.
5. Bergeslust. Allegro molto vivace e leggiero.

=== Op. 11 – Piano Trio ===
Hensel's Piano trio in D minor, Op. 11, was published posthumously in 1850.

The trio is in four movements:

1. Allegro molto vivace
2. Andante espressivo
3. Lied: Allegretto
4. Allegretto moderato

== Chronological ==
Fanny Hensel's compositions, sorted chronologically according to time of composition, with numbers following the Hellwig-Unruh catalogue:

=== 1819 ===
1. 12 Gavotten (lost).
2. Ihr Töne, schwingt euch fröhlich. Andante.

=== 1820 ===
3. Lied des Schäfers. Lebhaft.
4. Klavierstück.
5. Romance de Claudine. Allegretto.
6. Chanson des Bergères. Con Allegrezza.
7. Romance de Galatée. Allegretto.
8. Romance de Célestine. Lentement, avec douceur.
9. Isidore. Andante.
10. Die Schönheit nicht, o Mädchen. Grazioso.
11. Némorin (1). Allegro.
12. Zoraide. Douleureusement.
13. C'en est fait. Allegro molto agitato.
14. Annette. Dolce.
15. Sérénade de Cortez. Expression agitée.
16. Unique objet de ma tendresse.
17. Wenn Ich ihn nur habe.
18. Erster Verlust (1).
19. Füllest wieder Busch und Tal. Nicht zu schnell.
20. Ave Maria. Andante.
21. L'amitié.
22. Schwarz ihre Brauen.
23. C'est une larme.
24. So musst' ich von dir scheiden.
25. Der Seelen Ruhe ist es Gott. Choral; Ist uns der Sünden Last zu schwer. Rezitativ und Arioso.
26. Wohl deinem Liebling. Arioso.

=== 1821 ===
27. Du stillst der Meere Brausen.
28. Ob deiner Wunderzeichen Staunen.
29. Klavierstück.
30. Klavierstück. Andante.
31. Némorin (2). Andante.
32. Le rocher des deux amants.
33. Das stille Fleh'n.
34. La fuite inutile.
35. Au Bord d’une Fontaine.
36. Nähe des Geliebten (1). Sehr Sanft.
37. Klavierstück. Allegro.
38. Frühlingserinnerung. Andante Con Moto.
39. Klavierstück.
40. Klavierstück. Allegro Agitato.
41. Klavierstück.
42. Klavierstück.
43. Sonate.

=== 1822 ===
44. Sonatensatz. Allegro assai moderato.
45. Fischers Klage. Andante.
46. Die Nonne. Andante con moto.
47. Lauf der Welt. Allegretto.
48. Lebewohl. Langsam und klagend.
49. Der Blumenstrauß. Allegro.
50. Sehnsucht nach Italien.
51. Du hast, mein Gott. Agitato.
52. Mon coeur soupire.
53. Übungsstück. Allegro moderato.
54. Im Herbste (1). Andante.
55. Quartett. For piano, violin, viola and cello.
56. Die Linde. Larghetto.
57. Die Sommerrosen blühen. Allegretto.
58. Schlaflied. Andante grazioso.

=== 1823 ===
59. Der Neugierige. Allegretto.
60. Des Müllers Blumen. Allegretto.
61. Das Ständchen.
62. Die Liebe Farbe. Andante.
63. Gebet in der Christnacht. Larghetto.
64. Das Ruhetal.
65. Wiegenlied (1).
66. Die furchtsame Träne.
67. Übungsstück. Allegro molto.
68. Erinnerung. Andante con moto.
69. Übungsstück. Allegro agitato.
70. Der Abendstern. Sanft und langsam.
71. Übungsstück. Allegro moderato.
72. Adagio.
73. Lied der Fee. Mäßig.
74. Übungsstück. Larghetto.
75. Die sanften Tage. Langsam.
76. Der Sänger.
77. Die Schwalbe. Allegretto.
78. Schäfers Sonntagslied. Langsam.
79. Übungsstück. Allegro assai moderato.
80. Einsamkeit.
81. Walzer für den Herzog von Rovigo.
82. Abendreih'n. Allegretto.
83. Seefahrers Abschied. Moderato.
84. Übungsstück. Presto.
85. Der Fischer.
86. Übungsstück. Allegro ma non troppo.
87. Die Kapelle.
88. Übungsstück.
89. Am Morgen nach einem Sturm. Im Molo di Gaeta. Adagio.
90. Frühe Sorge.
91. Wanderlied (1). Allegretto.
92. Übungsstück. Allegro ma non troppo.
93. Die Spinnerin.
94. Wonne der Einsamkeit. Andante.
95. Erster Verlust (2). Andante.
96. Übungsstück.
97. (Op. 9.2) Ferne. Andante.
98. Die Liebende. Rasch und lebhaft.
99. Klavierstück. Lento ma non troppo.
100. Pilgerspruch.
101. Vereinigung.
102. Klavierstück. Andantino.
103. Übungsstück. Allegro molto agitato.
104. Canzonetta.
105. An die Entfernte. Lento.
106. Ohne sie. Agitato ma non presto.
107. Mein Herz, das ist begraben. Largo.
108. Übungsstück. Allegro di molto.
109. Die glückliche Fischerin.

=== 1824 ===
110. Wo kommst du her?. Andante.
111. Auf der Wanderung. Ruhig und heiter.
112. Klage. Larghetto.
113. Sonata O Capriccio.
114. Tokkate. Allegro moderato.
115. Abschied (1). Lento.
116. Klavierstück.
117. Sehnsucht (1).
118. Frage.
119. Herbstlied.
120. Frühlingsnähe. Allegretto.
121. An einen Liebenden im Frühling. Allegretto.
122. Mailied. Allegretto.
123. Übungsstück. Allegretto.
124. Jägers Abendlied. Langsam und sehr ruhig.
125. Glück.
126. Leben. Andante.
127. Gigue. Allegro.
128. Sonate.
129. Das Heimweh. Vivace et agitato.
130. Klavierstück. Allegro di molto.
131. Eilig zieh'n in weiter Ferne. Allegretto.
132. Klavierstück.
133. Nacht (1). Poco allegro.
134. Leiden. Allegro.
135. Verlor'nes Glück.
136. Übungsstück. Allegro assai.
137. Sonnenuntergang.
138. Am stillen Hain.
139. Klavierstück. Allegro.
140. 32 Fugen (lost).

=== 1825 ===
141. Sehnsucht (2). Andantino.
142. Verloren.
143. Der einsam Wandelnde.
144. Klavierstück.
145. Klavierstück.
146. Klavierstück. Andante con moto.
147. Wandrers Nachtlied (1).
148. An Suleika.
149. Suleika und Hatem. Allegretto.
150. Suleika (1).
151. Deinem Blick mich zu bequemen.
152. Sonett Aus Dem 13. Jahrhundert.
153. Das holde Tal (1).
154. Mond.
155. Ecco quel fiero Istante.
156. Ist es möglich, Stern der Sterne. Allegro Vivace.
157. Italien. Allegretto.
158. Dir zu eröffnen, mein Herz.
159. Rezitativ und Arie.
160. Schäfergesang.
161. Lass dich nur nichts nicht dauern.
162. Harfners Lied. Largo. Rezitativisch vorzutragen.
163. Erinnerungen an die Heimat.

=== 1826 ===
164. Die Schläferin. Commodo.
165. Capriccio. Humoristisch und etwas ironisch.
166. Etüde. Allegro moderatissimo.
167. Klavierstück. Allegro ma non troppo.
168. (Op. 9.3) Der Rosenkranz.
169. Feldlied.
170. Der Eichwald brauset. Allegro agitato.
171. Am Grabe.
172. Sie liebt mich.
173. Abendlandschaft.
174. Erwachen. Heiter.
175. Waldlied. Allegro vivace.
176. Mignon.
177. Klavierstück. Andante.
178. Geheimnis. Larghetto.
179. Schloss Liebeneck. Andante.
180. Der Sprosser.
181. Klavierstück. Andante con espressione.
182. An einem Herbstabende.
183. Klavierstück. Allegro di molto.
184. Westöstlicher Redaktionswalzer.
185. Der Frühlingsabend.
186. Ich hab' ihn gesehen. Allegro con moto.
187. Klavierstück (lost).
188. Marias Klage. Moderato.
189. Nähe des Geliebten (2). Adagio.
190. Sehnsucht (3). Moderato.
191. Neujahrslied.

=== 1827 ===
192. Sehnsucht (4). Largo.
193. Fugata. Largo non troppo lento.
194. Maigesang. Allegretto grazioso.
195. Seufzer. Andante con espressione.
196. (Op. 9.1) Die Ersehnte. Andante con moto.
197. Kein Blick der Hoffnung. Allegro agitato.
198. An den Mond.
199. Die Schiffende. Allegretto grazioso.
200. Klavierstück. Andante.
201. An die Ruhe. Moderato.
202. Klavierstück.
203. Sehnsucht (5). Andante.
204. Am Flusse. Andantino.
205. Sehnsucht (6). Sehr sanft.
206. Umsonst.
207. Was will die einsame Träne. Andante.
208. (Op. 9.5) Der Maiabend. Allegretto.
209. Die Sommernacht. Largo Maestoso.
210. Suleika (2). Adagio.
211. Achmed an Irza. Andante. Sempre piano e soave.
212. Am leuchtenden Sommermorgen.
213. Verlust. Allegro con fuoco.
214. Klavierbuch.

=== 1828 ===
215. Wenn ich mir in stiller Seele.
216. Keyboard piece in E minor.
217. Sehnsucht (7). Sanft und still.
218. Abendluft.
219. Sehnsucht (8). Andante.
220. Allnächtlich im Traume. Andante con moto.
221. Heut' in dieser Nacht.
222. (Op. 9.4) Die frühen Gräber. Lento e largo.
223. Fuge (lost).
224. Über die Berge steigt schon die Sonne.
225. Nacht (2). Larghetto.
226. Aglæ.
227. Wonne der Wehmut. Bewegt, nicht zu langsam.
235. Ostersonate (Easter Sonata), piano sonata in A major.

=== 1829 ===
228. Gram. Allegretto.
229. Klavierstück.
230. Selmar und Selma. Allegro molto.
231. Präludium (fragment).
232. Durch zartes Mailaub blinkt die Abendröte.
233. Schlafe du, schlafe du süß. Allegretto lusingando.
234. Lied (lost).
235. (see section on compositions from the year 1828 above)
236. Liederkreis: An Felix, consisting of six Lieder:
  1. "Lebewohl"
  2. "Grüner Frühling süße Mailuft"
  3. "Nun ist's nicht öd in meiner Brust"
  4. "O sprich wo blieb dein heitrer Sinn"
  5. "Im Hochland Bruder da schweifst du umher"
  6. "Wiedersehn"
237. Nachtreigen. Allegro Moderato.
238. Sonata O Fantasia.
239. Klavierstück. Presto.
240. Liederzyklus.
241. Schlafe, Schlaf! Andante.
242. Präludium (wedding Processional).
243. Präludium (wedding Recessional).
244. Präludium (fragment). Grave.
245. Zu deines Lagers Füßen.
246. Sonate (fragment).
247. Capriccio.
248. Die Hochzeit kommt. Festspiel.

=== 1830 ===
249. Wie dunkel die Nacht. Allegro agitato.
250. Lied. Allegro.
251. Präludium.
252. Genesungsfeier. Allegretto grazioso.
253. Fantasie. Adagio.
254. Minnelied des Grafen Peter von Provence. Allegro vivace.
255. Frühlingslied. Allegro molto vivace.

=== 1831 ===
256. "Der Schnee, der ist geschmolzen"
257. Lobgesang. Kantate. Nach Versen der Bibel und einem Text.
258. Hiob. Kantate. Nach Versen der Bibel.
259. "Nacht" (3). Allegretto.
260. Höret zu, merket auf. Oratorium/Kantate. Nach Versen der Bibel.
261. "O wie beseeligend gehen und kommen die Stunden". Allegro leggiermente.
262. "Hero und Leander". Dramatische Szene.

=== 1832 ===
263. Das Nordlicht. Allegro di molto.
264. So soll ich dich verlassen. Allegretto.
265. Ouvertüre. Andante; Cantabile.
266. Wiegenlied (2). Allegretto.
267. Klavierstück. Con moto.
268. Dem Unendlichen. Allegro moderato.
269. Duett für Tenor und Sopran. Mit den Fingern zu singen. Andante.

=== 1833 ===
270. Gegenwart. Allegro moderato.
271. In die Ferne. Allegretto affettuoso.
272. Zum Fest. Nach Versen aus der Messe der Heiligen Cäcilia.

=== 1834 ===
273. Fuge.
274. 3 Lieder nach Heine von Mary Alexander (Three poems by Heinrich Heine in the translations of Mary Alexander):
  1. "Once o'er my dark and troubled life"
  2. "I wander through the wood and weep"
  3. "What means the lonely tear"
275. Der Pilgrim vor St. Just. Tempo giusto.
276. Wo sich Gatten jene Schatten. Rasch und anmutig.
277. String Quartet.
  1. Adagio ma non troppo
  2. Allegretto
  3. Romanze
  4. Allegro molto vivace
278. Ich ging lustig durch den grünen Wald.

=== 1835 ===
279. Io d’amor, oh dio, mi moro. Konzertarie. Andante molto sostenuto.
280. In der stillen Mitternacht. Allegro ma non troppo.
281. An Cidli (fragments).
282. Abschied (2).
283. Wandl' ich in dem Wald des Abends. Andante.
284. Ich stand gelehnet an den Mast.
285. Über allen Gipfeln ist Ruh'.
286. Wenn der Frühling kommt. Allegro di molto.
287. Der Strauß.
288. Wie Feld und Au. Allegro.

=== 1836 ===
289. Frühzeitiger Frühling. Allegro.
290. Ein Hochzeitbitter. Allegretto.
291. Winterseufzer.
292. Wie dich die warme Luft umscherzt. Allegro con moto.
293. Gleich Merlin. Tutto legato e malinconico.
294. Klavierstück. Allegretto grazioso.
295. März. Allegretto.
296. April. Andante.
297. Mai. Allegretto leggiero.
298. Neue Liebe, neues Leben. Allegro di molto.
299. Klavierstück. Prestissimo.
300. Klavierstück. Allegro agitato.
301. (Op. 2.1) Lied. Andante.
302. Klavierstück. Allegro agitato.
303. Klavierstück. Allegro con spirito.
304. Klavierstück. Allegro con brio.
305. Das Meeresleuchten.
306. Suleika (3). Andante soave e dolce.
307. There Be None of Beauty’s Daughters. Allegro di molto.
308. Capriccio. Allegro ma non troppo.
309. Die Mitternacht war kalt. Allegro agitato.

=== 1837 ===
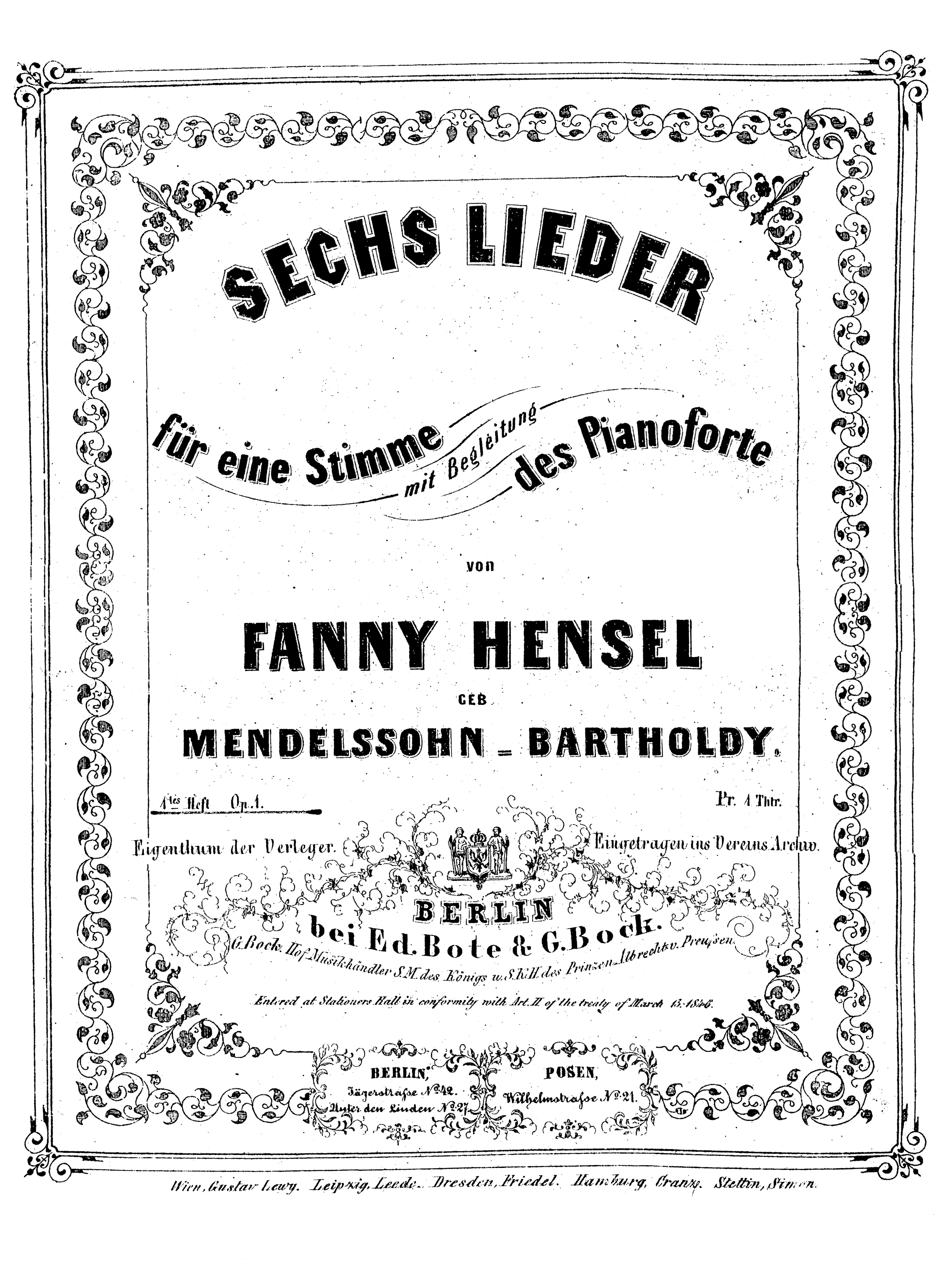
Fanny Hensel. Six Lieder for one voice with piano accompaniment Op. 1, title page of the booklet, 1846 ( n°: 312, 317, 358, 377,387, 388 on the list).

310. Bagatelle. Allegretto.
311. Bagatelle. Con moto.
312. (Op. 1.3) Warum sind denn die Rosen so blass. Andante.
313. Klavierstück. Allegro moderato.
314. Klavierstück. Andante con espressione.
315. Altes Lied. Con Moto.
316. Farewell. Adagio.
317. (Op. 1.2) Wanderlied (2). Allegro molto vivace.
318. Bright Be the Place of Thy Soul. Adagio largamente.
319. Komm mit. Allegretto grazioso.
320. Sprich, o sprich, wird Liebe mahnen.
321. Klavierstück. Allegro con brio.
322. Klavierstück. Largo con espressione.
323. Im wunderschönen Monat Mai. Allegro molto.
324. So hast du ganz und gar vergessen.
325. Ach, die Augen sind es wieder. Allegro moderato.

=== 1838 ===
326. Hör' ich das Liedchen klingen.
327. Aus meinen Tränen sprießen. Allegretto.
328. Fichtenbaum und Palme. Lento.
329. Wenn ich in deine Augen sehe. Andante con moto.
330. Klavierstück. Andante con moto.
331. (Op. 9.6) Die Mainacht. Andante.
332. Klavierstück. Allegro molto vivace ma con sentimento.
333. Etüde. Allegro con brio.
334. Ich wandelte unter den Bäumen. Andante con moto.
335. Das Meer erglänzte weit hinaus. Andante con moto.
336. Blumenlied. Allegro.
337. Notturno. Andantino.
338. Klavierstück. Allegro di molto.

=== 1839 ===
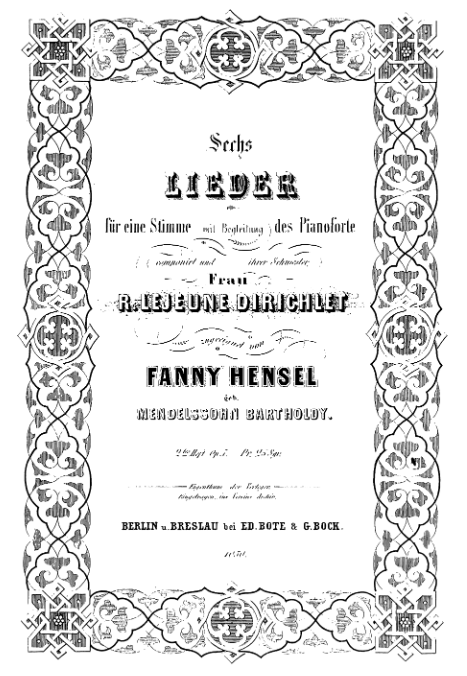
Fanny Mandelssohn Hensel. Six lieder with piano accompaniment op. 7, Title page, Bote & Bock Berlin 1848 (No 343, 397, 434, 440, 450, 464 on the list).

339. Klavierstück. Allegro grazioso.
340. Sehnsucht (9). Allegro con spirito.
341. Verschiedene Trauer.
342. (Op. 4/5.1) Mélodie. Allegro assai.
343. (Op. 7.4) Du bist die Ruh'. Moderato assai.
344. Strahlende Ostsee.
345. Gondelfahrt. Serenata.

=== 1840 ===
346. Klavierstück. Allegro moderato.
347. Sage mir, was mein Herz begehrt.
348. Deh Torna A Me. Cavatine. Andante cantabile.
349. Klavierstück. Introduktion; Allegro.
350. Klavierstück. Largo; Allegro con fuoco.
351. Das holde Tal (2). Allegro vivace.
352. Abschied von Rom. Ponte molle. Andante con espressione.
353. Villa Medicis. Allegro maestoso.
354. L’âme triste. Andante.
355. Hausgarten. Andante con moto.
356. (Op. 6.2) Lied. Allegro vivace.
357. (Op. 2.3) Villa Mills. Allegretto grazioso.
358. (Op. 1.1) Schwanenlied. Andante.
359. Der Fürst vom Berge. Allegro con brio.
360. Lass fahren hin. Sostenuto.
361. Dämmernd liegt der Sommerabend.
362. Mein Liebchen, wir saßen beisammen. Allegro.
363. 3 Duette:
  1. "Wiederkehrt ein lichter Maie"
  2. "Winter was hat dir getan"
  3. "Zeigt mir den Weg zu meiner lieben Frauen"
364. (Op. 4/5.3) Mélodie. Allegro molto quasi presto.
365. (Op. 4/5.5) Mélodie. Allegro molto vivace.
366. (Op. 4/5.6) Mélodie. Andante soave.
367. Wandrers Nachtlied (2).

=== 1841 ===
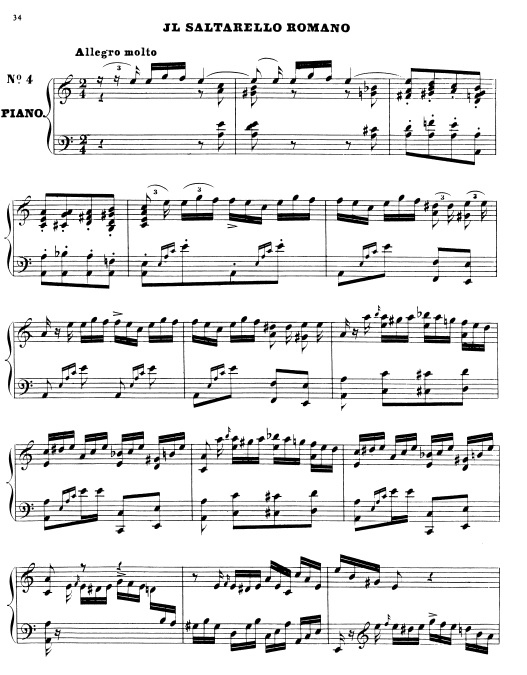
Score (excerpt) from) Il Saltarello Romano, op 6, No. 4 (No 372 on the list).

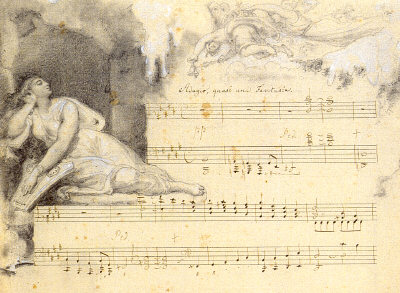
Autograph of the first piano piece "Januar" from the Cycle "Das Jahr" with illustration by Wilhelm Hensel (No 385.1 on the list).

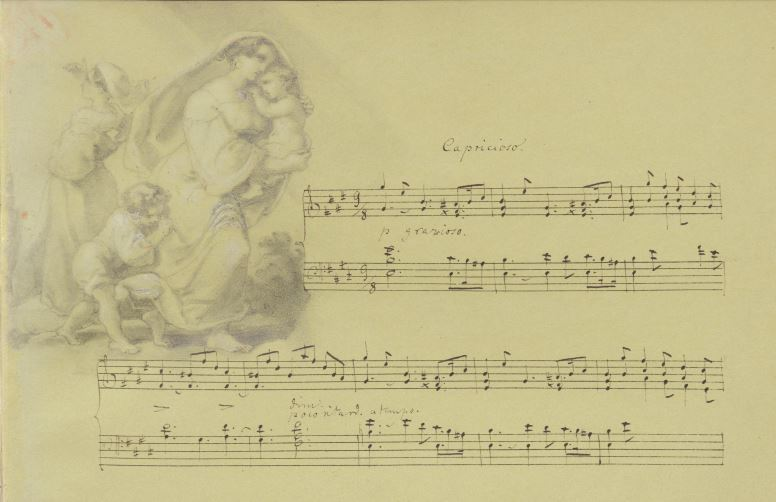
Beginning of April from the suite Das Jahr (No 385.4 on the list).

368. Klavierstück. Allegro Molto.
369. Klavierstück. Allegro Molto Vivace.
370. Unter des Laubdachs hut. Allegro.
371. Einleitung zu lebenden Bildern.
372. (Op. 6.4) Il Saltarello Romano. Tarantella. Allegro molto.
373. (Op. 10.1) Nach Süden. Allegro molto vivace.
374. Von dir, mein Lieb, ich scheiden muss.
375. Der Winterwind entflieht.
376. Klavierstück. Allegro molto.
377. (Op. 1.6) Gondellied. Allegretto.
378. Anklänge. 3 Lieder:
  1. "Vöglein in den sonnigen Tagen"
  2. "Ach wie ist es doch gekommen daß die ferne Waldespracht"
  3. "Könnt' ich zu den Wäldern flüchten"
379. Waldruhe. Andante con moto.
380. Traurige Wege. Andante con moto.
381. Klavierstück (fragment).
382. Auf dem See. Von Como. Allegro molto vivace.
383. Die Sennin. Allegretto.
384. Totenklage.
385. Das Jahr. 12 Charakterstücke - The Year, a collection of 13 compositions, 12 depicting a month of the year, and a postlude:
  1. Januar.
  2. Februar.
  3. März.
  4. April.
  5. Mai.
  6. Juni.
  7. Juli.
  8. August.
  9. (Op. 2.2) September.
  10. Oktober.
  11. November.
  12. Dezember.
  13. Nachspiel.
386. Duett.

=== 1842 ===
387. (Op. 1.4) Maienlied. Allegretto.
388. (Op. 1.5) Morgenständchen. Allegro molto quasi presto.

=== 1843 ===
389. Szene aus Faust. Der Tragödie zweiter Teil, Akt 1. Anmutige Gegend.
390. Wer dich gesehn.
391. Klavierstück. Allegro agitato.
392. Dämmrung senkte sich von oben. Andante con moto.
393. Klavierstück. Allegretto ma non troppo.
394. (Op. 2.4) Klavierstück. Allegro molto vivace.
395. Piano Sonata in G Minor.
396. Klavierstück. Adagio.
397. (Op. 7.1) Nachtwanderer. Andante con moto.
398. Wenn wir durch die Dörfer ziehen. Marschtempo.
399. Zauberkreis.
400. Mutter, o sing mich zur Ruh'.

=== 1844 ===
401. Die Stille. Andante con moto.
402. Liebe in der Fremde. Allegretto.
403. Klavierstück.
404. Klavierstück.
405. Klavierstück. Allegro moderato assai.
406. Klavierstück. Allegretto.
407. Im Herbst. Allegro molto.
408. Klavierstück. Allegro molto.
409. Klavierstück. Allegretto grazioso.
410. Klavierstück. Allegro molto.
411. Liederzyklus.
412. Traum. Allegretto.

=== 1846 ===
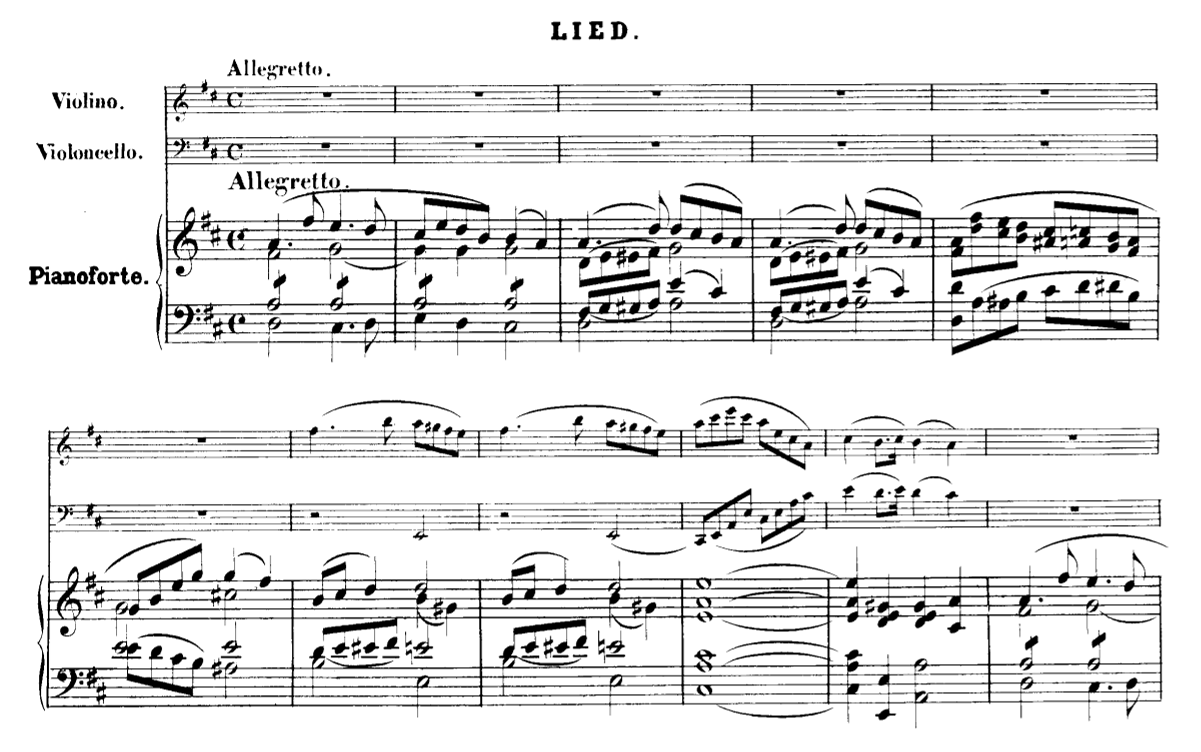
Fanny Hensel. Piano Trio in D minor, Opus 11: Beginning of the 3rd movement, "Lied." First edition, Breitkopf and Härtel, Wiesbaden 1850 (No 465 on the list).

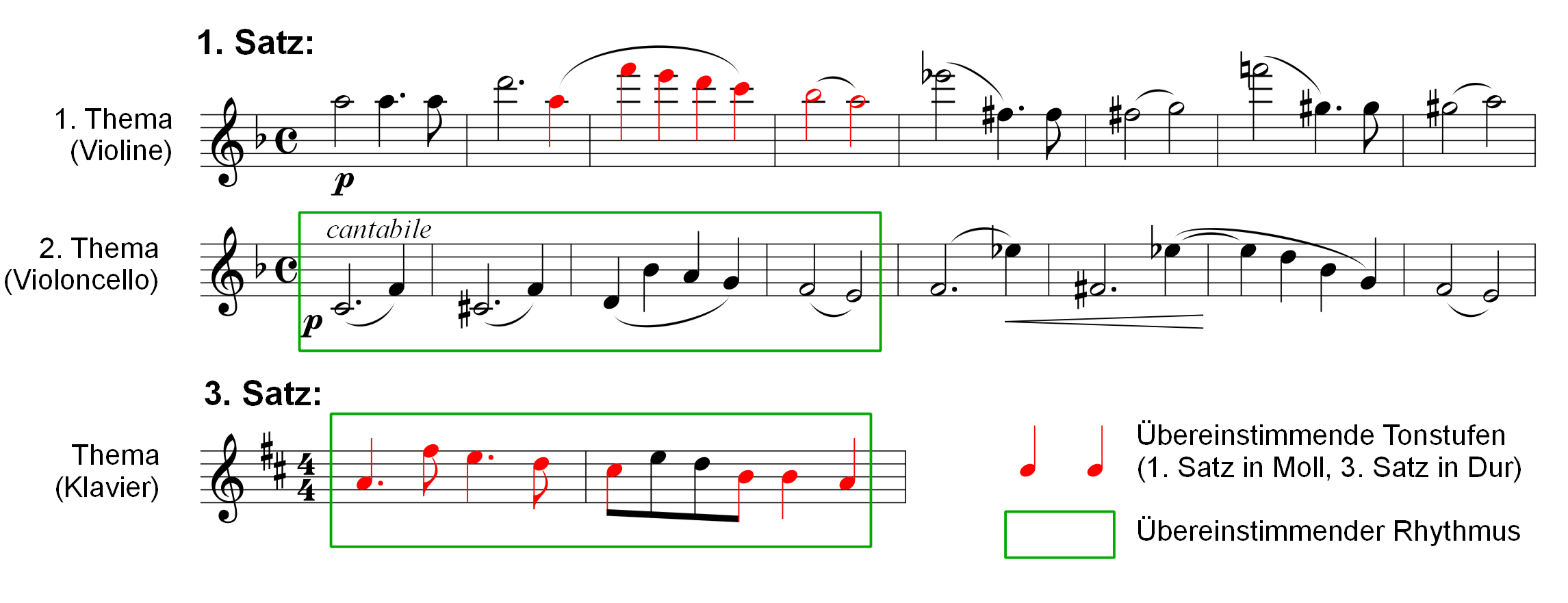
Piano Trio in D minor, Opus 11 : Comparison between themes of the 1st and 3rd movements (No 465 on the list).

413. Klavierstück. Allegro molto.
414. Klavierstück. Allegro molto vivace e leggiero.
415. Das Veilchen. Allegretto.
416. (Op. 10.4) Im Herbste (2). Adagio.
417. Klavierstück. Andante cantabile.
418. (Op. 3.6) Im Wald. Allegro vivace.
419. Es rauscht das rote Laub. Moderato.
420. (Op. 4/5.2) Mélodie. Allegretto.
421. (Op. 3.1) Hörst du nicht die Bäume rauschen. Allegretto.
422. (Op. 3.5) Abendlich schon rauscht der Wald. Andante.
423. (Op. 8.1) Lied. Allegro moderato.
424. (Op. 6.3) O Traum der Jugend, o goldner Stern. Andante cantabile.
425. Pastorella.
426. Klavierstück. Allegretto.
427. Klavierstück (fragment).
428. Waldeinsam. Allegro.
429. Morgenwanderung. Allegro moderato.
430. (Op. 3.3) Im Herbste (3). Allegro ma non troppo.
431. Erwache, Knab', erwache. Allegro.
432. (Op. 3.4) Morgengruß (1). Allegretto grazioso.
433. Morgengruß (2). Allegro molto.
434. (Op. 7.6) Dein ist mein Herz. Feierlich leidenschaftlich.
435. Ariel.
436. Abend. Adagio.
437. (Op. 3.2) Schöne Fremde. Moderato.
438. (Op. 4/5.4) Mélodie. Lento appassionato.
439. Schweigend sinkt die Nacht hernieder. Andante.
440. (Op. 7.5) Bitte. Larghetto.
441. Lust'ge Vögel. Allegretto.
442. Klavierstück. Allegro molto vivace.
443. Klavierstück. Tempo di scherzo.
444. Stimme der Glocken. Allegro moderato.
445. Schilflied. Largo.
446. (Op. 10.3) Abendbild (1). Andante con moto.
447. Wer will mir wehren zu singen.
448. O Herbst, in linden Tagen. Ruhig, wehmütig.
449. Schon kehren die Vögel wieder ein. Allegretto grazioso.
450. (Op. 7.2) Erwin. Allegretto con espressione.
451. Ich kann wohl manchmal singen. Andante.
452. Klavierstück. Andante con moto.
453. Nacht ist wie ein stilles Meer. Allegro.
454. (Op. 6.1) Lied. Andante espressivo.
455. Abendbild (2).
456. Lied. Andante espressivo; più allegro.
457. Beharre. Andante con moto non lento.
458. (Op. 8.4) Wanderlied. Presto.
459. Klavierstück. Allegro vivace.
460. Kommen und Scheiden. Allegretto.
461. (Op. 8.3) Lied. Larghetto.
462. (Op. 10.2) Vorwurf.
463. (Op. 8.2) Lied. Andante con espressione.
464. (Op. 7.3) Frühling. Allegro molto.

=== 1847 ===
465. (Op. 11) Piano Trio in D minor.
466. (Op. 10.5) Bergeslust. Allegro molto vivace e leggiero.
