= August Junkermann =

German stage actor

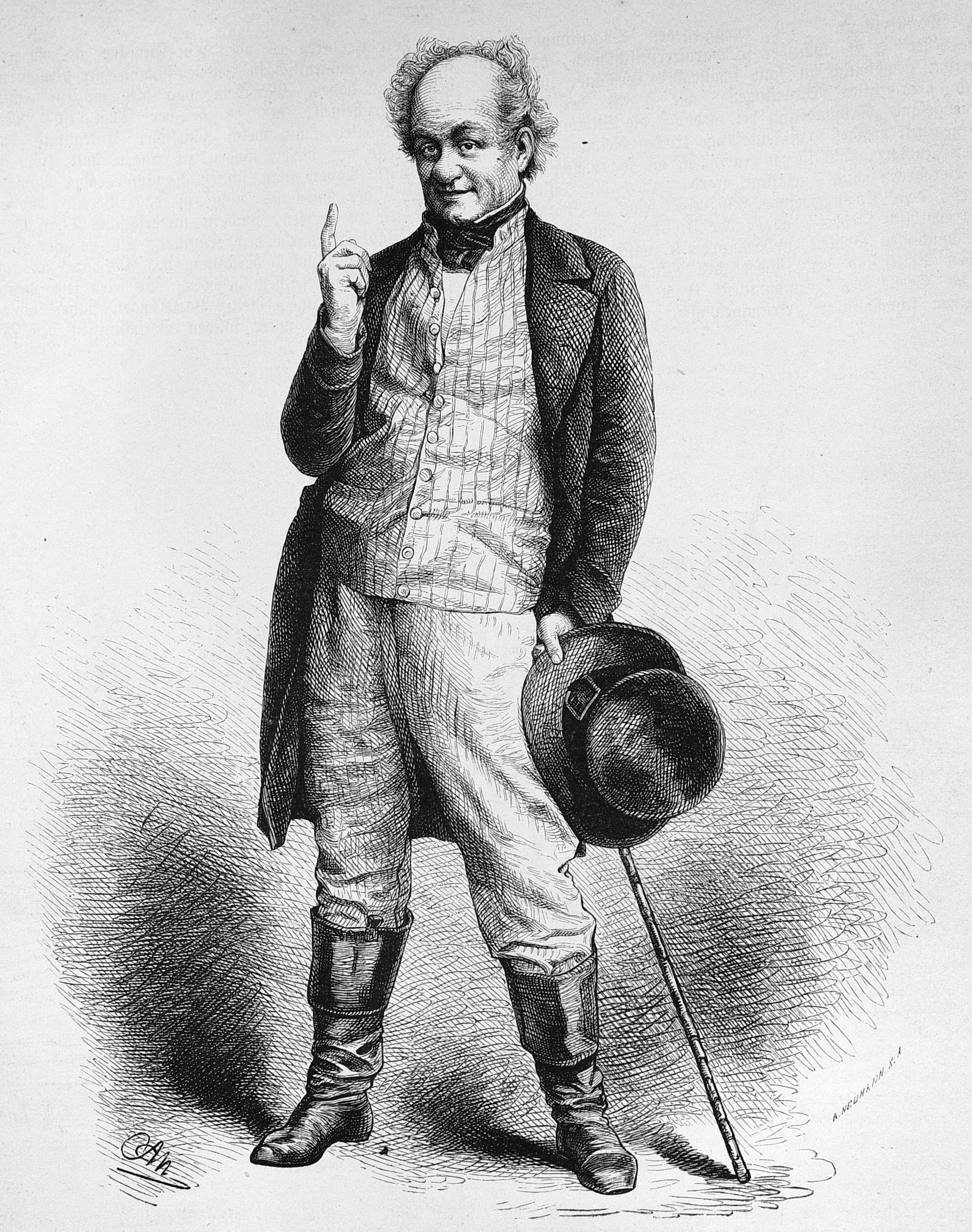
August Junkermann

August Junkermann (15 December 1832 – 15 May 1915) was a German actor and, as a narrator, an important interpreter of Fritz Reuter's works.

== Life and work ==
Born in Bielefeld, Junkermann joined the Royal Prussian Artillery Regiment in Cologne at the age of 17 as an officer's aspirant. After successes in amateur performances in front of the officer corps, he received his first engagement at the Theater Trier in 1853. Performances as a singer and comedian followed on many stages in Germany, Austria and Switzerland. From 1871 to 1887 Junkermann belonged to the ensemble of the Staatstheater Stuttgart.

Junkermann had already occupied himself with the works of Fritz Reuter at an early age. He brought the works of the humourist closer to his audience not only through recitation but also by portraying Reuter's characters on stage. His parade role was that of "Uncle Bräsig". Soon Junkermann was regarded as the "apostle of the Low German poet Fritz Reuter". Junkermann is on a par with Karl Kräpelin, the first Reuter reciter of the 19th century, and Ludwig Sternberg, the famous Reuter interpreter of the 20th century.

Germans abroad, for example in England and Italy, also celebrated Junkermann at his guest performances. He undertook several lecture tours in the US. In New York, he was made an honorary member of the "Plattdütschen Volksfest-Vereen". Junkermann adapted Reuter for the stage and appeared in funny one-acts as actors of Reuter's work characters, among others as Jochen Päsel, as pastor in Hanne Nütes Abschied, as Möller Voß, as Smid Snut, as Dörchläuchting or as Schauster Hank. His sons Hans Junkermann and Fritz Junkermann also took part in his "Junkermann Ensemble" at times.

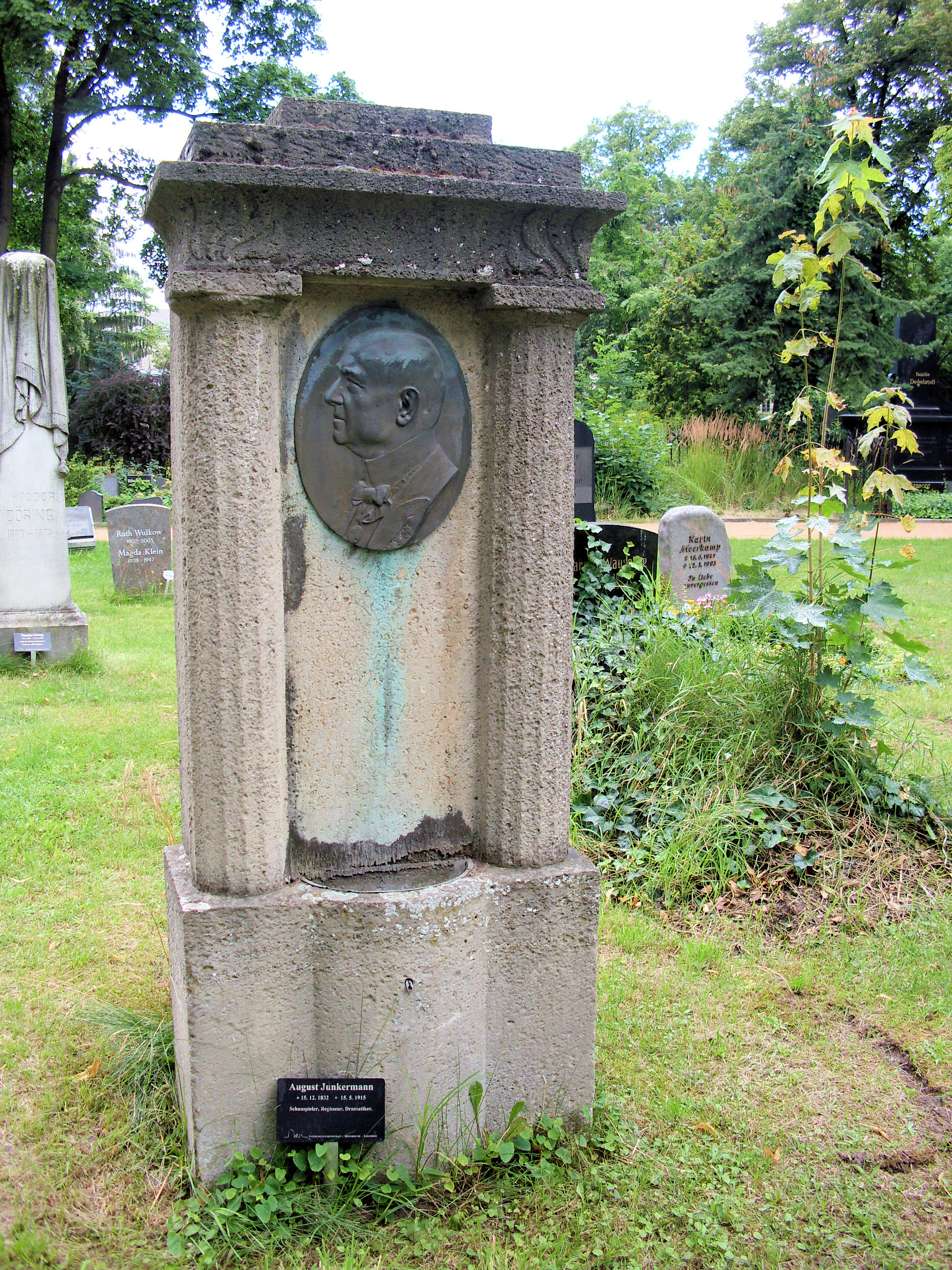
August Junkermann's grave in Berlin-Kreuzberg with portrait relief by Fritz Richter-Elsner

Junkermann died on 15 May 1915 in Berlin after a stroke at the age of 82. The funeral took place on 18 May at the Cemetery III of the Jerusalems- und Neue Kirche in front of Hallesches Tor. The funeral service was conducted by Pastor Eduard Le Seur from Groß-Lichterfelde, a nephew of the deceased. A report in the Berliner Tageblatt regretfully noted that only a few fellow actors attended the funeral. The surviving grave monument to Junkermann is a stele in the form of a columnar aedicule holding an oval portrait relief, the work of sculptor Fritz Richter-Elsner.

== Family ==
A son from his first marriage was Karl Junkermann, actor and theatre director. His wife Anna Junkermann was also an actress. His second marriage was to the actress and singer Rosa Le Seur (1846-1920), their joint son Hans also became an actor. Fritz Junkermann was another son from this marriage who was also an actor.

== Work ==
- Memoiren eines Hof-Schauspielers, illustrations by H. Graube, Süddeutsche Verlags-Institut, 1888
- Junkermanns Humoristikum: Eine Sammlung heiterer Vortragsstücke von erprobter Wirksamkeit, Mit einem Vorspiel: Meine zweite Amerikafahrt, Levy & Müller, Stuttgart 1890

== Letters ==
- 4 letters and cards by August Junkermann to various recipients 17 November 1888 to 31 May 1902.
