= Neue Berliner Musikzeitung =

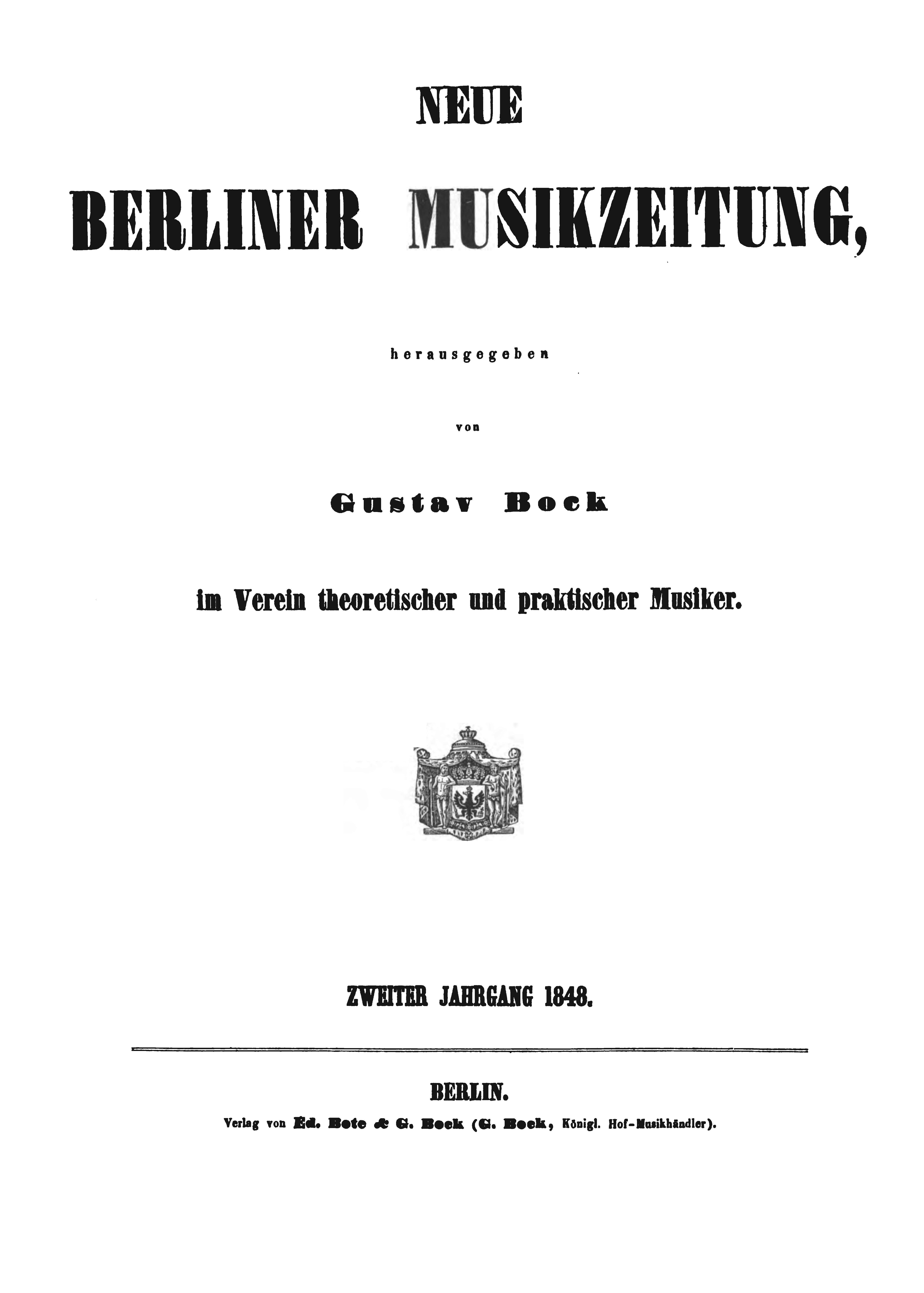
Neue Berliner Musikzeitung

Neue Berliner Musikzeitung was a musical periodical that appeared in the years 1847–1896 and was published by Bote & Bock. It was a continuation of the "Berliner Musikalische Zeitung" published between 1844 and 1847 by Karl Gaillard.

== History ==
The Neue Berliner Musikzeitung reported extensively on the musical life in Berlin, but also on other cities in Germany and Europe. And together with the Allgemeine Musikalische Zeitung and the Neue Zeitschrift für Musik, it was widely considered the most important and influential music periodical in Berlin as well as in the German states. In addition, it was the official publication of the Berlin Association of Musicians.

It was established by Gustave Bock, a former board member of the publisher, and later edited by Hermann Wolff (1845–1902), a concert agent who was responsible for the founding of the Berlin Philharmonic Society.

=== Correspondents ===
- Berlin: H. Bussler, L. Deppe, Heinrich Dorn, H. Ehrlich, Robert Eitper, Ferdinand Gumbert, W. Lackowitz, W. Langhans, O. Liebel, A. Löschhorn, H. Truhn, Heinrich Urban, Max Vogler, W. Westerhausen
- Berlin-Charlottenburg: Otto Lessmann
- Dresden: Emil Naumann
- Cologne: August Guckeisen
- Königsberg: Gustav Dullo, Louis Köhler
- Leipzig: Johann Christian Lobe (1859–1867)
- Milan: Martin Röder
- Petersburg: W. v. Lenz
- Potsdam: Mrs. Alberti
- Röhrsdorf: Robert Musiol
- Szczecin: Carl Kossmaly
- St. Mauritz: Joseph Seiler

== See also ==
- Music of Germany
